= 2001 in country music =

This is a list of notable events in country music that took place in the year 2001.

== Events ==
- May 9 – Toby Keith and Aaron Tippin at the 36th ACM Awards.
- Ray Price celebrates his 50th Grand Ole Opry anniversary

== Top hits of the year ==
The following songs placed within the Top 20 on the Hot Country Songs charts in 2001:

US	Single	Artist	Reference
1	Ain't Nothing 'bout You	Brooks & Dunn	
9	Angels in Waiting	Tammy Cochran	
1	Angry All the Time	Tim McGraw	
4	Ashes by Now	Lee Ann Womack	
1	Austin	Blake Shelton	
1	Born to Fly	Sara Evans	
2	Burn	Jo Dee Messina	
1	But for the Grace of God	Keith Urban	
18	But I Do Love You	LeAnn Rimes	
5	Complicated	Carolyn Dawn Johnson	
1	Don't Happen Twice	Kenny Chesney	
17	Don't Make Me Come Over There and Love You	George Strait	
5	Downtime	Jo Dee Messina	
16	God Bless the USA	Lee Greenwood	
12	A Good Day to Run	Darryl Worley	
1	Grown Men Don't Cry	Tim McGraw	
2	I Could Not Ask for More	Sara Evans	
1	I Wanna Talk About Me	Toby Keith	
4	I Would've Loved You Anyway	Trisha Yearwood	
3	I'm a Survivor	Reba McEntire	
1	I'm Already There	Lonestar	
1	I'm Just Talkin' About Tonight	Toby Keith	
6	I'm Tryin'	Trace Adkins	
3	If I Fall You're Going Down with Me	Dixie Chicks	
3	If My Heart Had Wings	Faith Hill	
5	If You Can Do Anything Else	George Strait	
2	It's a Great Day to Be Alive	Travis Tritt	
11	It's My Time	Martina McBride	
8	Laredo	Chris Cagle	
20	The Last Thing on My Mind	Patty Loveless	
2	Love of a Woman	Travis Tritt	
18	Loving Every Minute	Mark Wills	
11	Lucky 4 You (Tonight I'm Just Me)	SHeDAISY	
18	Man of Me	Gary Allan	
17	Move On	The Warren Brothers	
6	Mrs. Steven Rudy	Mark McGuinn	
4	On a Night Like This	Trick Pony	
1	One More Day	Diamond Rio	
1	Only in America	Brooks & Dunn	
17	People Like Us	Aaron Tippin	
12	Pour Me	Trick Pony	
14	Real Life (I Never Was the Same Again)	Jeff Carson	
2	Riding with Private Malone	David Ball	
5	Right Where I Need to Be	Gary Allan	
16	Rose Bouquet	Phil Vassar	
2	Run	George Strait	
20	Second Wind	Darryl Worley	
2	She Couldn't Change Me	Montgomery Gentry	
8	She Misses Him	Tim Rushlow	
9	Six-Pack Summer	Phil Vassar	
18	Sweet Summer	Diamond Rio	
1	Tell Her	Lonestar	
1	There Is No Arizona	Jamie O'Neal	
11	There You'll Be	Faith Hill	
9	This Everyday Love	Rascal Flatts	
19	The Tin Man	Kenny Chesney	
4	Two People Fell in Love	Brad Paisley	
1	What I Really Meant to Say	Cyndi Thomson	
8	When God-Fearin' Women Get the Blues	Martina McBride	
1	When I Think About Angels	Jamie O'Neal	
15	When It All Goes South	Alabama	
5	When Somebody Loves You	Alan Jackson	
1	Where I Come From	Alan Jackson	
3	Where the Blacktop Ends	Keith Urban	
1	Where Were You (When the World Stopped Turning)	Alan Jackson	
7	While You Loved Me	Rascal Flatts	
1	Who I Am	Jessica Andrews	
13	Why They Call It Falling	Lee Ann Womack	
7	Wild Horses	Garth Brooks	
10	With Me	Lonestar	
1	Without You	Dixie Chicks	
19	You Made Me That Way	Andy Griggs	
1	You Shouldn't Kiss Me Like This	Toby Keith	

== Top new album releases ==
The following albums placed within the Top 50 on the Top Country Albums charts in 2001:

US	Album	Artist	Record label
4	Alright Guy	Gary Allan	MCA Nashville
3	Blake Shelton	Blake Shelton	Warner Bros.
6	Carrying On	Montgomery Gentry	Columbia
4	Chrome	Trace Adkins	Capitol Nashville
6	Dare to Dream	Billy Gilman	Epic
10	Down from the Mountain Soundtrack	Various Artists	Lost Highway
10	Gravitational Forces	Robert Earl Keen	Lost Highway
1	Greatest Hits	Martina McBride	RCA Nashville
8	Greatest Hits II	Clint Black	RCA Nashville
1	Greatest Hits Vol. 3: I'm a Survivor	Reba McEntire	MCA Nashville
1	I Need You	LeAnn Rimes	Curb
1	I'm Already There	Lonestar	BNA
1	Inside Out	Trisha Yearwood	MCA Nashville
10	Loving Every Minute	Mark Wills	Mercury Nashville
7	My World	Cyndi Thomson	Capitol Nashville
4	Never Love You Enough	Chely Wright	MCA Nashville
3	New Favorite	Alison Krauss & Union Station	Rounder
5	One More Day	Diamond Rio	Arista Nashville
3	Part II	Brad Paisley	Arista Nashville
1	Pull My Chain	Toby Keith	DreamWorks Nashville
1	The Road Less Traveled	George Strait	MCA Nashville
5	The Rock: Stone Cold Country 2001	George Jones	Bandit
8	Room with a View	Carolyn Dawn Johnson	Arista Nashville
1	Scarecrow	Garth Brooks	Capitol Nashville
1	Set This Circus Down	Tim McGraw	Curb
8	Songs from Call Me Claus	Garth Brooks	Capitol Nashville
1	Steers & Stripes	Brooks & Dunn	Arista Nashville
7	Three Days	Pat Green	Republic
6	Time* Sex* Love*	Mary Chapin Carpenter	Columbia
6	What a Wonderful Christmas	Anne Murray	StraightWay
4	When It All Goes South	Alabama	RCA Nashville
2	Who I Am	Jessica Andrews	DreamWorks Nashville

=== Other top albums ===
US	Album	Artist	Record label
45	3 of Hearts	3 of Hearts	RCA Nashville
11	Amigo	David Ball	Dualtone
26	Anthology, Vol. 1: Cowboy Man	Lyle Lovett	MCA Nashville
49	The Captain	Kasey Chambers	Warner Bros.
18	Complete	Lila McCann	Asylum
43	The Complete Limelight Sessions	Shania Twain	Limelight
47	A Country Superstar Christmas 4	Various Artists	Hip-O
32	Dancin' with Thunder: The Official Music of the PBR	Various Artists	Epic
42	A December to Remember	Aaron Tippin	Lyric Street
50	Del and the Boys	Del McCoury Band	Ceili
16	Driven Soundtrack	Various Artists	Curb
39	Earl Scruggs and Friends	Earl Scruggs	MCA Nashville
43	Followin' a Feelin'	Sherrié Austin	WE
49	From the Heart	The Oak Ridge Boys	Spring Hill
20	God Bless America	LeAnn Rimes	Curb
22	Hank Williams: Timeless	Various Artists	Lost Highway
35	Have Yourself a Merry Little Christmas	Lee Greenwood	Freefalls
50	Here Come the Derailers	The Derailers	Lucky Dog
47	A Hillbilly Tribute to AC/DC	Hayseed Dixie	Dualtone
35	History of the Future	Ricky Skaggs	Skaggs Family
32	The Houston Kid	Rodney Crowell	Sugar Hill
13	I Finally Found Someone	Lorrie Morgan & Sammy Kershaw	RCA Nashville
44	III	Chad Brock	Warner Bros.
12	Little Sparrow	Dolly Parton	Blue Eye
35	Live Close By, Visit Often	K. T. Oslin	BNA
38	Live!	Charlie Daniels	Blue Hat
18	Mark McGuinn	Mark McGuinn	VFR
19	Mountain Soul	Patty Loveless	Epic
20	Nothing Personal	Delbert McClinton	New West
35	O Sister! The Women's Bluegrass Collection	Various Artists	Rounder
19	RCA Country Legends	Waylon Jennings	RCA Nashville
24	Reach	Meredith Edwards	Mercury Nashville
38	Real Life	Jeff Carson	Curb
47	Roots, Volume 1	Merle Haggard	Anti
24	Roy D. Mercer vs. Yankees	Roy D. Mercer	Capitol Nashville
14	Say No More	Clay Walker	Giant
42	Songcatcher Soundtrack	Various Artists	Vanguard
26	Songs We Wish We'd Written	Pat Green & Cory Morrow	Write On
27	Step Right Up	Charlie Robison	Lucky Dog
27	Tammy Cochran	Tammy Cochran	Epic
12	Ten Rounds	Tracy Byrd	RCA Nashville
27	This Is Your Country	Various Artists	UTV
24	Thunder & Roses	Pam Tillis	Arista Nashville
28	Tim Rushlow	Tim Rushlow	Atlantic
13	Tracy Lawrence	Tracy Lawrence	Warner Bros.
12	Trick Pony	Trick Pony	Warner Bros.
30	The Whole SHeBANG: All Mixed Up	SHeDAISY	Lyric Street

== Births ==
- July 20 – Max McNown, singer-songwriter of the 2020s ("Better Me for You (Brown Eyes)").

== Deaths ==
- February 1 — John Jarrard, 47, songwriter (respiratory failure)
- February 7 — Dale Evans, 88, writer, actress, singer-songwriter, and wife of singing cowboy Roy Rogers
- April 8 — Van Stephenson, 47, guitarist, vocalist and co-founding member of the 1990s group Blackhawk (skin cancer)
- June 4 — John Hartford, 63, singer-songwriter and bluegrass musician (non-Hodgkin Lymphoma)
- June 30 — Chet Atkins, 77, guitarist and record producer (colon cancer)
- July 3 — Johnny Russell, 61, singer-songwriter best known for writing the Buck Owens classic "Act Naturally" (diabetes)
- July 22 – Bob Ferguson, 73, record producer and songwriter, best known for work with Porter Wagoner and Dolly Parton (cancer).
- September 11 — Carolyn Mayer Beug, 48, filmmaker and music video director who directed three music videos for Dwight Yoakam (killed when American Airlines Flight 11 crashed into World Trade Center)
- December 3 – Grady Martin, 72, session guitarist and member of Nashville's "A Team" (heart attack)

== Hall of Fame inductees ==
=== Bluegrass Music Hall of Fame inductees ===
- The Carter Family
  - A. P. Carter
  - Sara Carter
  - Maybelle Carter

=== Country Music Hall of Fame inductees ===
- Bill Anderson (born 1937)
- The Delmore Brothers (Alton Delmore 1908–1964 and Rabon Delmore 1916–1952)
- The Everly Brothers (Don Everly born 1937 and Phil Everly born 1939)
- Don Gibson (1928–2003)
- Homer and Jethro (Homer Haynes 1920–1971 and Jethro Burns 1920–1989)
- Waylon Jennings (1937–2002)
- The Jordanaires (Gordon Stoker born 1924, Neal Matthews, Jr. 1929–2000, Hoyt Hawkins 1927–1982 and Ray Walker born 1934)
- Don Law (1902–1982)
- The Louvin Brothers (Ira Louvin 1924–1965 and Charlie Louvin born 1927)
- Ken Nelson (born 1911)
- Sam Phillips (1923–2003)
- Webb Pierce (1921–1991)

=== Canadian Country Music Hall of Fame inductees ===
- Gordon Lightfoot
- Gary Buck

== Major awards ==
=== Grammy Awards ===
- Best Female Country Vocal Performance — "Shine", Dolly Parton
- Best Male Country Vocal Performance — "O Death", Ralph Stanley
- Best Country Performance by a Duo or Group with Vocal — "The Lucky One", Alison Krauss & Union Station
- Best Country Collaboration with Vocals — "I am a Man of Constant Sorrow", Harley Allen, Pat Enright and Dan Tyminski
- Best Country Instrumental Performance — "Foggy Mountain Breakdown", Jerry Douglas, Gen Duncan, Vince Gill, Albert Lee, Steve Martin, Leon Russell, Earl Scruggs, Gary Scruggs, Randy Scruggs, Paul Shaffer & Marty Stuart
- Best Country Song — "The Lucky One", Alison Krauss & Union Station
- Best Country Album — Hank Williams Tribute, Various Artists (Producers: Bonnie Garner, Luke Lewis and Mary Martin)
- Best Bluegrass Album — New Favorite, Alison Krauss & Union Station

=== Juno Awards ===
- Best Country Artist/Group — Carolyn Dawn Johnson
- Best New Country Artist/Group — The Ennis Sisters

=== Academy of Country Music ===
- Entertainer of the Year — Brooks & Dunn
- Song of the Year — "Where Were You (When the World Stopped Turning)", Alan Jackson
- Single of the Year — "Where Were You (When the World Stopped Turning)", Alan Jackson
- Album of the Year — O Brother, Where Art Thou?
- Top Male Vocalist — Alan Jackson
- Top Female Vocalist — Martina McBride
- Top Vocal Duo — Brooks & Dunn
- Top Vocal Group — Lonestar
- Top New Male Vocalist — Phil Vassar
- Top New Female Vocalist — Carolyn Dawn Johnson
- Top New Vocal Duo or Group — Trick Pony
- Video of the Year — "Only in America", Brooks & Dunn (Director: Michael Merriman)
- Vocal Event of the Year — "I am a Man of Constant Sorrow", Various Artists

=== ARIA Awards ===
(presented in Sydney on October 30, 2001)

- Best Country Album - Looking Forward Looking Back (Slim Dusty)

=== Canadian Country Music Association ===
- Telus Mobility Fans' Choice Award — Terri Clark
- Male Artist of the Year — Jason McCoy
- Female Artist of the Year — Carolyn Dawn Johnson
- Group or Duo of the Year — The Wilkinsons
- SOCAN Song of the Year — "Complicated", Carolyn Dawn Johnson
- Single of the Year — "Complicated", Carolyn Dawn Johnson
- Album of the Year — Room with a View, Carolyn Dawn Johnson
- Top Selling Album — Breathe, Faith Hill
- Video of the Year — "No Fear", Terri Clark
- Chevy Trucks Rising Star Award — Carolyn Dawn Johnson
- Roots Artist or Group of the Year — Natalie MacMaster

=== Country Music Association ===
- Entertainer of the Year — Tim McGraw
- Song of the Year — "Murder on Music Row", Larry Cordle, Larry Shell
- Single of the Year — "I am a Man of Constant Sorrow", The Soggy Bottom Boys
- Album of the Year — O Brother, Where Art Thou?
- Male Vocalist of the Year — Toby Keith
- Female Vocalist of the Year — Lee Ann Womack
- Vocal Duo of the Year — Brooks & Dunn
- Vocal Group of the Year — Lonestar
- Horizon Award — Keith Urban
- Music Video of the Year — "Born to Fly", Sara Evans (Director: Peter Zavadil)
- Vocal Event of the Year — "Too Country", Brad Paisley (with George Jones, Bill Anderson and Buck Owens)
- Musician of the Year — Dann Huff

== Other links ==
- Country Music Association
- Inductees of the Country Music Hall of Fame
