= The Best of Trick Pony =

Greatest hits album by Trick Pony
- Released: April 13, 2009
- Recorded: 2000–2002
- Genre: Country
- Length: 33:03
- Label: Warner Bros. Nashville
- Producer: Chuck Howard

Trick Pony chronology
R.I.D.E. (2005)	The Best of Trick Pony (2009)	Pony Up (2016)

The Best of Trick Pony is the first compilation album by American country music group Trick Pony. It was released on April 13, 2009, via Warner Bros. Nashville. The compilation features ten songs from the group's first two studio albums: Trick Pony (2001) and On a Mission (2002).

The compilation peaked at number 58 on the US Top Country Albums chart, spending two weeks on the chart in total.

== Track listing ==
All songs produced by Chuck Howard.

No.	Title	Writer(s)	Original album	Length
1.	"Spent"	David Lee Murphy; Kim Tribble	Trick Pony	2:42
2.	"A Boy Like You"	Tom Shapiro; Rivers Rutherford; Heidi Newfield	On a Mission	3:26
3.	"On a Night Like This"	Doug Kahan; Karen Staley	Trick Pony	3:30
4.	"Pour Me"	Rory Waters Beighley; Sammy Harp Wedlock; Keith Burns; Ira Dean; Newfield	Trick Pony	2:49
5.	"Party of One"	Staley; Dean; Kahan	Trick Pony	3:17
6.	"On a Mission"	Murphy; Tribble; Dean	On a Mission	2:58
7.	"Every Other Memory"	Staley; Dean; Kahan	Trick Pony	3:49
8.	"More Like Me"	Burns; Dean; Newfield	Trick Pony	3:22
9.	"Whiskey River" (featuring Willie Nelson)	Johnny Bush; Paul Stroud	On a Mission	3:57
10.	"Just What I Do"	Burns; Dean	Trick Pony	3:22
Total length:				33:03

== Charts ==
Chart (2009)	Peak position
US Top Country Albums (Billboard)	58
