= 38th Academy of Country Music Awards =

US music awards ceremony in 2003

39th Academy of Country Music Awards
- Date: May 21, 2003
- Location: Mandalay Bay Resort & Casino, Las Vegas, Nevada
- Hosted by: Reba McEntire

Highlights
- Most wins: Kenny Chesney; Alan Jackson; Rascal Flatts (2 each)
- Most nominations: Toby Keith (8)

Television/radio coverage
- Network: CBS

The 38th Academy of Country Music Awards were held on May 21, 2003 at for the first time was held at the Mandalay Bay Resort & Casino, Las Vegas, Nevada. The ceremony was hosted by ACM Award winner, Reba McEntire.

== Winners and nominees ==
Winners are shown in bold.

| Entertainer of the Year | Album of the Year |
|---|---|
| **Toby Keith**; Brooks & Dunn; Kenny Chesney; Dixie Chicks; Alan Jackson | **Drive — Alan Jackson**; Home — Dixie Chicks; No Shoes, No Shirt, No Problems — Kenny Chesney; On a Mission — Trick Pony; Unleashed — Toby Keith |
| Top Female Vocalist of the Year | Top Male Vocalist of the Year |
| **Martina McBride**; Terri Clark; Faith Hill; Shania Twain; Lee Ann Womack | **Kenny Chesney**; Alan Jackson; Toby Keith; Tim McGraw; George Strait |
| Top Vocal Group of the Year | Top Vocal Duo of the Year |
| **Rascal Flatts**; Diamond Rio; Dixie Chicks; Lonestar; Trick Pony | **Brooks & Dunn**; Hometown News; Montgomery Gentry; Sons of the Desert; The Bellamy Brothers |
| Single Record of the Year | Song of the Year (Award for both songwriter(s) and performer(s)) |
| **"The Good Stuff" — Kenny Chesney**; "19 Somethin'" — Mark Wills; "Courtesy of the Red, White and Blue (The Angry American)" — Toby Keith; "Just What I Do" — Trick Pony; "Somebody Like You" — Keith Urban | **"I'm Movin' On" — Phillip Brian White and David Vincent Williams**; "A Lot of Things Different" — Bill Anderson and Dean Dillon; "Courtesy of the Red, White, and Blue (The Angry American)" — Toby Keith; "Drive (For Daddy Gene)" — Alan Jackson; "Forgive" — Rebecca Lynn Howard and Trey Bruce |
| Top New Male Vocalist | Top New Female Vocalist |
| **Joe Nichols**; Blake Shelton; Darryl Worley | **Kellie Coffey**; Jennifer Hanson; Rebecca Lynn Howard |
| Top New Vocal Duo or Group | Video of the Year |
| **Emerson Drive**; Nickel Creek; Pinmonkey | **"Drive (For Daddy Gene)" — Alan Jackson**; "Courtesy of the Red, White, and Blue (The Angry American)" — Toby Keith; "I'm Gonna Miss Her (The Fishin' Song)" — Brad Paisley; "Just What I Do" — Trick Pony; "She's My Kind of Rain" — Tim McGraw; "Who's Your Daddy" — Toby Keith |
Vocal Event of the Year
**"Mendocino County Line" — Willie Nelson and Lee Ann Womack**; "Beer For My Horses" — Toby Keith and Willie Nelson; "Designated Drinker" — Alan Jackson and George Strait; "Picture" — Kid Rock and Sheryl Crow; "Whiskey River" — Trick Pony and Willie Nelson

== Performers ==
| Performer(s) | Song(s) |
|---|---|
| Kenny Chesney | "Big Star" |
| Toby Keith; Willie Nelson | "Beer for My Horses" |
| Brooks & Dunn | "Red Dirt Road" |
| Terri Clark | "I Just Wanna Be Mad" |
| Alan Jackson | "The Sounds" |
| Martina McBride | "Concrete Angel" |
| Shania Twain | "Forever and for Always" |
| George Strait | "Write This Down" "Does Fort Worth Ever Cross Your Mind" "She'll Leave You with a Smile" "Check Yes or No" "The Chair" |
| Wynonna | "What the World Needs" |
| Lonestar | "I'm Already There" |
| Keith Urban | "Raining on Sunday" |
| Diamond Rio | "I Believe" |
| Rascal Flatts | "Love You Out Loud" |
| LeAnn Rimes | "Love Is an Army" |
| Darryl Worley | "Have You Forgotten?" |
| Alabama | "Tennessee River" |
| Dixie Chicks | "Godspeed (Sweet Dreams)" |
| Montgomery Gentry | "My Town" |

== Presenters ==
| Presenter(s) | Notes |
|---|---|
| Wayne Newton | Host introduction |
| Rebecca Lynn Howard; Kellie Coffey; Jennifer Hanson | Terri Clark performance |
| Joe Nichols; Blake Shelton; Darryl Worley | Album of the Year |
| Mark Miller; Lance Burton | Single Record of the Year |
| Phil Vassar; Pinmonkey | Top New Male Vocalist |
| Bill Engvall; Jake Simpson | Top Vocal Duo of the Year |
| Carrie Turner; Penn & Teller | Song of the Year |
| Carolyn Dawn Johnson; Emerson Drive | Top New Female Vocalist |
| Tony Stewart | Diamond Rio performance |
| Trick Pony; Eric Close | Top New Vocal Duo or Group |
| Lee Ann Womack | Top Male Vocalist of the Year |
| Nancy O'Dell | LeAnn Rimes performance |
| Mark Wills; Pam Tillis | Top Vocal Group of the Year |
| Kenny Chesney | Pioneer Award to Alabama |
| Cledus T. Judd | Montgomery Gentry performance |
| Louise Mandrell; Trace Adkins | Top Female Vocalist of the Year |
| Vince Gill | Entertainer of the Year |
