= 44th Academy of Country Music Awards =

US music awards ceremony in 2009

- Date: April 5, 2009
- Location: MGM Grand Garden Arena, Las Vegas, Nevada
- Hosted by: Reba McEntire

Highlights
- Most wins: Brad Paisley (3)
- Most nominations: Brad Paisley (6)

Television/radio coverage
- Network: CBS

The 44th Academy of Country Music Awards were held on April 5, 2009, at the MGM Grand Garden Arena, Las Vegas, Nevada. The ceremony was hosted by ACM Award winner Reba McEntire.

== Winners and nominees ==
Winners are shown in bold.

Entertainer of the Year (Note: From 2008 to 2015, 'Entertainer of the Year' was decided by a combination of ACM professional membership and fan votes cast online and via text message.)	Album of the Year
**Carrie Underwood**; Kenny Chesney; Brad Paisley; George Strait; Keith Urban	**Fearless — Taylor Swift**; That Lonesome Song — Jamey Johnson; Back When I Knew It All — Montgomery Gentry; Troubadour — George Strait; Carnival Ride — Carrie Underwood
Top Female Vocalist of the Year	Top Male Vocalist of the Year
**Carrie Underwood**; Miranda Lambert; Heidi Newfield; Taylor Swift; Lee Ann Womack	**Brad Paisley**; Kenny Chesney; Toby Keith; George Strait; Keith Urban
Top Vocal Group of the Year	Top Vocal Duo of the Year
**Rascal Flatts**; Lady Antebellum; Little Big Town; The Lost Trailers; Randy Rogers Band	**Sugarland**; Big & Rich; Brooks & Dunn; Joey + Rory; Montgomery Gentry
Single Record of the Year	Song of the Year
**“You're Gonna Miss This” — Trace Adkins**; “Gunpowder & Lead” — Miranda Lambert; “In Color” — Jamey Johnson; “Johnny & June” — Heidi Newfield; “Waitin' On A Woman” — Brad Paisley	**“In Color” — Jamey Johnson, Lee Thomas Miller, James Otto**; “I Saw God Today” — Rodney Clawson, Monty Criswell, Wade Kirby; “Johnny & June” — Deanna Bryant, Heidi Newfield, Stephony Smith; “Waitin' On A Woman” — Don Sampson, Wynn Varble; “You're Gonna Miss This” — Ashley Gorley and Lee Thomas Miller
Top New Artist of the Year	Video of the Year
**Julianne Hough**; Jake Owen; Zac Brown Band	**"Waitin' On A Woman" — Brad Paisley**; "Johnny & June" — Heidi Newfield; "Just A Dream" — Carrie Underwood; "Love Story" — Taylor Swift; "Troubadour" — George Strait
Vocal Event of the Year
**“Start A Band” — Brad Paisley with Keith Urban**; “Another Try” — Josh Turner with Trisha Yearwood; “Cowgirls Don't Cry” — Brooks & Dunn with Reba McEntire; “Down The Road” — Kenny Chesney with Mac McAnally; “Life In A Northern Town” — Sugarland with Little Big Town & Jake Owen

== Performers ==
Performer(s)	Song(s)
Brooks & Dunn; Taylor Swift; Sugarland; Carrie Underwood; Rascal Flatts	"Play Something Country" "Picture to Burn" "It Happens" "All-American Girl" "Me and My Gang"
Kenny Chesney	"Out Last Night"
Heidi Newfeild	"Johnny & June"
Toby Keith	"God Love Her"
Jamey Johnson	"In Color"
George Strait	"Troubadour"
Taylor Swift	"You're Not Sorry"
Lady Antebellum	"I Run to You"
LeAnn Womack	"Solitary Thinkin'"
Keith Urban	"Kiss a Girl"
Miranda Lambert	"Dead Flowers"
John Rich	"Shuttin' Detroit Down"
Miley Cyrus	"The Climb"
Montgomery Gentry	"One in Every Crowd"
Reba McEntire	"Strange"
Trace Adkins	"Til The Last Shot's Fired"
Sugarland	"What I'd Give"
Blake Shelton	"She Wouldn't Be Gone"
Rascal Flatts	"Here Comes Goodbye"

== Presenters ==
Award	Presenter(s)
Song of the Year	Jennifer Love Hewitt
Top Vocal Group of the Year	Darius Rucker
Top New Artist of the Year	Jack Ingram; Jason Aldean
Top Vocal Duo of the Year	Kaley Cuoco
Top Male Vocalist of the Year	Martina McBride
Top Female Vocalist of the Year	Dierks Bentley
Single of the Year	Sugarland
Album of the Year	Blake Shelton
Entertainer of the Year	Matthew McConaughey
