= It's a Heartache =

1977 single by Bonnie Tyler

Single by Bonnie Tyler

from the album Natural Force
- B-side: "Got So Used to Lovin' You"
- Released: 4 November 1977
- Genre: Country; folk rock
- Length: 3:31
- Label: RCA Victor
- Songwriters: Ronnie Scott; Steve Wolfe
- Producers: David Mackay; Ronnie Scott; Steve Wolfe

Bonnie Tyler singles chronology
"Heaven" (1977)	"It's a Heartache" (1977)	"Here Am I" (1978)

Music video
- "It's a Heartache" on YouTube

"'It's a Heartache'" is a song recorded by Welsh singer Bonnie Tyler. Written by Ronnie Scott and Steve Wolfe, and co-produced with David Mackay, the single was released in November 1977 by RCA Records. The song topped the charts in Australia, Canada, and numerous European countries, and reached No. 3 in the US and No. 4 in the UK. Worldwide, "It's a Heartache" sold around six million copies.

In the United States, Tyler's version was released in 1978 around the same time as versions of the song were released by Juice Newton and Ronnie Spector.

== Background ==
"It's a Heartache" was recorded at The Factory Sound in Surrey, England, in 1977. Mike Gibbins, who previously was the drummer for the Welsh band Badfinger, played drums on the recording. Producer David Mackay finished the construction of his recording studio in mid-1977, and this song was cut during the very first session.

"It's a Heartache" was one of the first recordings Tyler made following a surgical procedure to remove nodules from her vocal folds. The procedure left Tyler with an "unusually husky voice", which AllMusic journalist Marcy Donelson described as "an effective instrument".

== Release ==
Producer David Mackay recalled that RCA Records was reluctant to release the single as the label was pre-occupied with reissuing Elvis Presley's back catalogue following his unexpected death in August 1977. Mackay, Scott and Wolfe threatened to terminate their contract with RCA if they did not release the track immediately. "It's a Heartache" was released on 4 November 1977 in parts of Europe, including the United Kingdom, and March 1978 in the United States and Canada.

== Critical reception ==
The release had music critics comparing Tyler's voice to Rod Stewart's. Carol Wetzel from Spokane Daily Chronicle complimented Tyler's voice on "It's a Heartache", stating that her previous big hit, "Lost in France", is "no big deal, probably because it was made before her voice changed."

== Other versions ==
In 1978, Juice Newton released a cover through Capitol Records, produced by John Palladino. Newton reached No. 86 on the US Billboard Hot 100 chart and No. 91 on the Canadian RPM Singles Chart. In the same year, Ronnie Spector issued a single through Alston Records. Tyler, Newton and Spector's versions were all released in the same week in the United States, with Billboard listing each one as "recommended" tracks.

Dave & Sugar's 1981 rendition of "It's a Heartache" reached No. 32 on the Billboard Country Singles Chart.

== Charts ==
=== Weekly charts ===
Chart (1977–1978)	Peak position
Argentina	1
Australia (Kent Music Report)	1
Austria (Ö3 Austria Top 40)	3
Belgium (Ultratop 50 Flanders)	2
Brazil BPRA	1
Canada (CRIA)	1
Canada 100 Singles (RPM)	1
Canada Adult Contemporary (RPM)	1
Canada Country Playlist (RPM)	2
Europe (Europarade Top 30)	2
Finland (Suomen virallinen lista)	2
France Europe 1	1
Ireland (IRMA)	3
Netherlands (Dutch Top 40)	3
Netherlands (Single Top 100)	5
New Zealand (Recorded Music NZ)	4
Norway (VG-lista)	1
South Africa (Springbok Radio)	2
Spain (AFYVE)	1
Sweden (Sverigetopplistan)	1
Switzerland (Schweizer Hitparade)	3
UK Singles (Official Charts)	4
US Adult Contemporary (Billboard)	10
US Billboard Hot 100	3
US Hot Country Songs (Billboard)	10
US Cash Box Top 100	3
West Germany (GfK)	2

2026 chart positions of "Holding Out for a Hero"
Chart (2026)	Peak position
UK Singles Downloads (Official Charts)	12
UK Singles Sales (Official Charts)	14
US Digital Songs (Billboard)	7

=== Year-end charts ===
Chart (1978)	Peak position
Australia (Kent Music Report)	7
Canada Top 200 Singles (RPM)	21
Canada Top 50 Country Singles (RPM)	44
New Zealand (Recorded Music NZ)	37
South Africa (Springbok Radio)	9
Switzerland (Schweizer Hitparade)	12
US Billboard Hot 100	24
US Cash Box Pop Singles	17

== Sales and certifications ==
Region	Certification	Certified units/sales
Argentina	—	100,000
Australia (ARIA)	Gold	35,000^{^}
Canada (Music Canada)	Gold	75,000^{^}
France (SNEP)	Platinum	1,000,000^{*}
New Zealand (RMNZ)	Gold	15,000^{‡}
United Kingdom (BPI)	Gold	500,000^{^}
United States (RIAA)	Gold	1,000,000^{^}
Summaries
Worldwide	—	6,000,000
^{*} Sales figures based on certification alone.^{^} Shipments figures based on certification alone.^{‡} Sales+streaming figures based on certification alone.

== Kareen Antonn and Bonnie Tyler ==
In 2004, Tyler released a bi-lingual duet with French singer Kareen Antonn. Renamed "Si tout s'arrête", the single reached No. 7 on the Belgian Flanders chart, No. 12 in France and No. 25 in Switzerland. In the following year, Tyler included a solo version of the song, sung entirely in English, on her album Wings.

Chart (2004)	Peak position
Belgium Wallonie Ultratop	7
France Top Singles Snep	12
Poland Airplay Charts	7
Switzerland Singles Top 100	25
European Hot 100 Singles Billboard	27

== Trick Pony version ==
"It's a Heartache"

Single by Trick Pony

from the album R.I.D.E.
- Released: January 31, 2005
- Genre: Neotraditional country
- Length: 3:27
- Label: Asylum-Curb
- Songwriters: Ronnie Scott; Steve Wolfe
- Producer: Chuck Howard

Trick Pony singles chronology
"The Bride" (2004)	"It's a Heartache" (2005)	"Ain't Wastin' Good Whiskey on You" (2005)

American country music group Trick Pony recorded a version of the song for their third studio album R.I.D.E. (2005). The group's record label, Asylum-Curb Records, released "It's a Heartache" as the second single from the album on 31 January 2005. Heidi Newfield sang the main vocals, and Chuck Howard produced. At the end of July 2005, the cover peaked at number 22 on the Hot Country Songs chart, while reaching number 18 on the Radio & Records version of the country chart. Bobby Peacock of Roughstock called the cover a "near-carbon copy" of the original.

=== Commercial performance ===
Trick Pony's cover of "It's a Heartache" debuted on the US Billboard Hot Country Songs chart the week of February 12, 2005 at number 49, becoming the second highest debut of the week. Slowly, the song barely missed the top twenty, peaking at number 22 on July 30, 2005 and becoming the most successful single from the album. It was their highest peaking single since "On a Mission" peaked at number 19 in 2003 and their final top forty hit to date. On the Radio & Records version of the country chart, it performed even better by peaking at number 18.

=== Music video ===
Jeffrey Phillips directed the music video. The video features a couple going through a divorce, which includes cut-scenes of the members of Trick Pony. While the husband is buying wine, two robbers come in and hold the owner at gunpoint. The husband tries to stop them but is stabbed by one of the thieves. The police then break the news to the wife, who is devastated. The video ends with the wife going to her would-be ex-husband's grave.

The video began airing in late April 2005 on the Great American Country channel.

=== Charts ===
==== Weekly charts ====
Chart (2005)	Peak position
US Hot Country Songs (Billboard)	22

==== Year-end charts ====
Chart (2005)	Peak position
US Country (Radio & Records)	68

=== Release history ===
Release dates and format(s) for "It's a Heartache" (Trick Pony version)
Region	Date	Format(s)	Label(s)	Ref.
United States	January 31, 2005	Country radio	Asylum-Curb Records	
