= On a Night Like This (disambiguation) =

"On a Night Like This" is a song by Kylie Minogue.

On a Night Like This may also refer to:

== Music ==
- On a Night Like This (concert tour), Kylie Minogue

=== Albums ===
- On a Night Like This, album by Buckwheat Zydeco 1987
- On a Night Like This, album by Simone Egeriis
- On a Night Like This, compilation album by The Boomtown Rats 2008

=== Songs ===
- "On a Night Like This" (Bob Dylan song), 1973, covered by Los Lobos
- "On a Night Like This" (Trick Pony song), written Doug Kahan and Karen Staley, 2001
- "On A Night Like This", song by Dan Seals, from Rebel Heart 1983
- "On A Night Like This", hit single by The Shadows, written John David 1984
- "On A Night Like This", song by Eddy Arnold, written Steven Dale Jones & Bud McGuire 1993
- "On A Night Like This", song by La Bouche, from Moment of Love 1997
- "On A Night Like This", song by Lari White, from Stepping Stone 1998
- "On A Night Like This", song by The Strawbs, from Déjà Fou 2004
- "On A Night Like This", song by Sanne Salomonsen, Peer Astrom / Troy Verges, from The Show 2005, and The Hits 2006
- "On A Night Like This", song by Gerry Rafferty
- "On a Night Like This", song by Lady Antebellum from Ocean, 2019
