= Brown eyes (disambiguation) =

Brown eyes are organs of vision, each with a brown-pigmented iris surrounding its pupil.

Brown eyes may also refer to:

== Biology ==
- Bright-line brown-eye, a moth of Eurasia and North Africa
- Chaetocneme porphyropis, or purple browneye, an Australian butterfly
- Chylismia claviformis, or browneyes, a North American wildflower

== Music ==
- Brown Eyes (band), a South Korean duo

=== Songs ===
- "Brown Eyes" (song), by Fleetwood Mac, 1979
- "Better Me for You (Brown Eyes)", song by Max McNown, 2024
- "Brown Eyes", by Blackstreet from Level II, 2003
- "Brown Eyes", by Chris Andrews 1970
- "Brown Eyes", by Destiny's Child from Survivor, 2001
- "Brown Eyes", by the Everly Brothers from Some Hearts, 1988
- "Brown Eyes", by Jimmy Cliff from Cliff Hanger, 1985
- "Brown Eyes", by Lady Gaga from The Fame, 2008
- "Brown Eyes", by the Partridge Family from Sound Magazine, 1971
- "Brown Eyes", by Rachael Yamagata from Elephants...Teeth Sinking into Heart, 2008
- "Brown Eyes", by Red House Painters from Red House Painters, 1993
- "Brown Eyes", by the Saints, with Baba Brooks

== Fictional characters ==
- "Brown Eyes", a nickname for Din Djarin in the Star Wars universe
