= List of DreamWorks Records artists =

Artists formerly signed to DreamWorks Records include the following:

== A ==
- AFI
- Alien Ant Farm
- The All-American Rejects
- Jessica Andrews (DreamWorks Nashville)
- Lisa Angelle (DreamWorks Nashville)
- The Apex Theory
- Asleep at the Wheel

== B ==
- Tori Baxley (DreamWorks Nashville)
- Blackstreet
- Blinker the Star
- Boomkat
- Tamar Braxton
- Buckcherry

== C ==
- Canela
- Josh Clayton-Felt
- Citizen Cope
- Dan Colehour (DreamWorks Nashville)
- Creeper Lagoon
- Cupcakes
- Jason Cuba

== D ==
- Linda Davis (DreamWorks Nashville)
- Deadly Venoms
- Deadsy
- Roxie Dean (DreamWorks Nashville)
- Dr. Octagon

== E ==
- eastmountainsouth
- Eels
- Scotty Emerick (DreamWorks Nashville)
- Emerson Drive (DreamWorks Nashville)
- Elliott Smith

== F ==
- Jimmy Fallon
- Rick Ferrell (DreamWorks Nashville)
- Floetry
- John Fogerty
- Forest for the Trees
- Kim Fox
- Jeff Foxworthy (DreamWorks Nashville)
- Nelly Furtado

== H ==
- Hanna-McEuen (DreamWorks Nashville)
- Eric Heatherly (DreamWorks Nashville)
- Hem
- Dave Hollister
- Hot Apple Pie (DreamWorks Nashville)

== I ==
- The Isley Brothers

== J ==
- Joanna Janét (DreamWorks Nashville)
- Maria Jensen
- Jimmy Eat World
- Jolie & The Wanted (DreamWorks Nashville)
- Jonathan Fire*Eater
- JS
- Jud Mahoney

== K ==
- Toby Keith (DreamWorks Nashville)
- Kina

== L ==
- Tracy Lawrence (DreamWorks Nashville)
- Leisure (see Middle Class Rut)
- Len
- Lifehouse
- Living Things
- Long Beach Dub Allstars
- Loudermilk
- Leslie Carter ("Like Wow!" shelved before being released.)

== M ==
- Mac McAnally (DreamWorks Nashville)
- George Michael (US and Canada)
- Morphine
- Jessy Moss

== N ==
- Randy Newman
- The Nitty Gritty Dirt Band (DreamWorks Nashville)
- N-Toon

== O ==
- Ours

== P ==
- Papa Roach
- Danielle Peck (DreamWorks Nashville)
- Michelle Poe (DreamWorks Nashville)
- Powerman 5000
- Pressure 4-5
- Propellerheads

== R ==
- Redmon & Vale (DreamWorks Nashville)
- Johnny Reid (DreamWorks Nashville)
- Chris Rock
- Rollins Band

== S ==
- Saves the Day
- Shane Sellers (DreamWorks Nashville)
- Erick Sermon
- Elliott Smith
- Solé
- Soluna
- Sparta
- Swizz Beatz
- Self

== T ==
- Chalee Tennison (DreamWorks Nashville)
- Randy Travis (DreamWorks Nashville)
- Sisely Treasure

== W ==
- Mike Walker (DreamWorks Nashville)
- Jimmy Wayne (DreamWorks Nashville)
- Rufus Wainwright
- John Williams
- Darryl Worley (DreamWorks Nashville)
