= The Bride (song) =

Single by Trick Pony

from the album R.I.D.E.
- Released: June 21, 2004
- Recorded: 2004
- Genre: Country
- Length: 3:00
- Label: Asylum-Curb
- Songwriters: Liz Hengber; Darryl Burgess; Lee Ann Burgess
- Producer: Chuck Howard

Trick Pony singles chronology
"A Boy Like You" (2003)	"The Bride" (2004)	"It's a Heartache" (2005)

Music video
- "The Bride" on YouTube

"The Bride" is a song by American country music group Trick Pony, recorded for their third and final studio album R.I.D.E. (2005). The song was penned by Liz Hengber, Darryl Burgess, and Lee Ann Burgess and produced by Chuck Howard. It was released on June 21, 2004 as the lead single from the album and the group's debut single for Asylum-Curb Records following their departure from Warner Bros. Nashville in 2003.

A moderate success, it peaked at number 27 on the US Hot Country Songs chart, becoming their fifth top forty hit.

== Music video ==
Peter Zavadil, who directed all the music videos from their debut studio album, returned to film the video for "The Bride". The video was filmed in Las Vegas on June 17, 2004 and featured cameos from Kiss's Gene Simmons, Wayne Newton, John Schneider and Estella Gardinier. It debuted to CMT and GAC on July 18, 2004.

== Commercial performance ==
"The Bride" debuted on the US Billboard Hot Country Songs chart the week of July 3, 2004 at number 59. It rose to number 48 the following week. It reached a peak position of number 27 on the chart for the week of October 2, 2004, where it stayed for three consecutive weeks; it spent twenty weeks in total.

== Charts ==
Chart (2004)	Peak position
US Hot Country Songs (Billboard)	27

=== Year-end charts ===
Chart (2004)	Position
US Hot Country Singles & Tracks (Billboard)	99

== Release history ==
Release dates and format(s) for "The Bride"
Region	Date	Format(s)	Label(s)	Ref.
United States	June 21, 2004	Country radio	Asylum-Curb	
