= Go On (song) =

2000 single by George Strait

Single by George Strait

from the album George Strait
- B-side: "Murder on Music Row"
- Released: July 10, 2000
- Genre: Country
- Length: 3:48 (album version); 3:21 (single edit)
- Label: MCA Nashville #172169
- Songwriters: Tony Martin; Mark Nesler
- Producers: Tony Brown; George Strait

George Strait singles chronology
"The Best Day" (2000)	"Go On" (2000)	"Don't Make Me Come Over There and Love You" (2000)

"Go On" is a song written by Mark Nesler and Tony Martin, and recorded by American country music artist George Strait. It was released in July 2000 as the lead-off single from his self-titled album.

== Critical reception ==
An uncredited article from the Toledo Blade said that "Go On" was "typical of Strait's style on many of his mid-tempo songs[…]and the lyrics give a clever but mature view about life going on in the wake of a broken heart." Greg Crawford, in an article from the Orlando Sentinel, said that Strait "push[es] the rarely heard upper limits of his vocal range," and an uncredited Hartford Courant review wrote that the song had a "breezy chorus hook." Chuck Taylor in his review of the single for Billboard Magazine said that the song has a "conversational quality that almost makes listeners feel as if they are eavesdropping on a private discussion and privy to the beginnings of a blossoming new romance." He also said that Strait delivers the lyric effortlessly and that the song has a "lilting, inviting melody that is perfectly suited for summertime airwaves."

== Chart performance ==
"Go On" debuted at number 38 on the U.S. Billboard Hot Country Singles & Tracks for the week of July 29, 2000. The song spent twenty-two weeks on the Billboard Hot Country Singles & Tracks (now Hot Country Songs) charts, peaking at number two for three nonconsecutive weeks, being blocked by Aaron Tippin's "Kiss This" and John Michael Montgomery's "The Little Girl". The song also reached number one on the RPM Country Tracks charts dated for the week ending October 16, 2000, and held that position for one week. The song's b-side, "Murder on Music Row", charted at number 38 on the country music charts within the same timespan.

Chart (2000)	Peak position
Canada Country Singles (RPM)	1
US Billboard Hot 100	40
US Hot Country Songs (Billboard)	2

=== Year-end charts ===
Chart (2000)	Position
US Country Songs (Billboard)	31
