= Johnny & June (song) =

Single by Heidi Newfield

from the album What Am I Waiting For
- Released: March 31, 2008
- Genre: Country rock, country pop
- Length: 3:38
- Label: Curb
- Songwriters: Heidi Newfield; Deanna Bryant; Stephony Smith
- Producer: Tony Brown

Heidi Newfield singles chronology
| "Johnny & June" (2008) | "Cry Cry ('Til the Sun Shines)" (2008) |

"Johnny & June" is the solo debut song co-written and recorded by American country music singer Heidi Newfield, the former lead singer of the group Trick Pony. It was released in March 2008 as the first single from her debut album What Am I Waiting For, which was released in August 2008 on Curb Records. The song reached a peak of #11 on the Hot Country Songs charts in late September 2008, becoming Newfield's only solo Top 20 Country hit to date.

== Content ==
"Johnny & June" is a ballad that was written by Heidi Newfield alongside Deanna Bryant and Stephony Smith. The song features a female narrator who describes the kind of relationship that she wishes to have with her lover — specifically, one comparable to the relationship between singer Johnny Cash and his wife, June Carter Cash.

== Critical reception ==
In his review of the album, Matt C. of Engine 145, noted that the song "sounds good against the rest of the album" but also said that it "is diminished by its association with the recent explosion of lesser name-checking songs."

== Music video ==
A music video, directed by Eric Welch, was released in August 2008. The video begins with Newfield wearing a white dress, as she performs on stage inside an empty auditorium. She is then shown sitting on the hood of a black Cadillac. During the chorus, she is surrounded by flames while dressed in black, a reference to Cash's "Ring of Fire".

== Personnel ==
The following musicians perform on this track.

- Dan Dugmore – steel guitar
- Kenny Greenberg – electric guitar
- Wes Hightower – background vocals
- Greg Morrow – drums
- Steve Nathan – piano
- Stephony Smith – background vocals
- Ilya Toshinsky – acoustic guitar
- Glenn Worf – bass guitar
- Reese Wynans – Hammond B-3 organ
- Jonathan Yudkin – cello

== Chart performance ==
"Johnny & June" debuted at number 46 on the Billboard Hot Country Songs chart for the chart week of April 19, 2008. The song spent 27 weeks on the country charts, eventually peaking at number 11 on September 27, 2008. The song also crossed over to pop charts, peaking at number 58 on the Hot 100 chart. The song has sold 862,000 copies in the US as of May 2016.

| Chart (2008) | Peak position |
|---|---|
| US Hot Country Songs (Billboard) | 11 |
| US Billboard Hot 100 | 58 |

=== Year-end charts ===
| Chart (2008) | Position |
|---|---|
| US Country Songs (Billboard) | 54 |

== Certifications ==
| Region | Certification | Certified units/sales |
|---|---|---|
| United States (RIAA) | Platinum | 1,000,000^{‡} |
^{‡} Sales+streaming figures based on certification alone.
