= Burns & Poe =

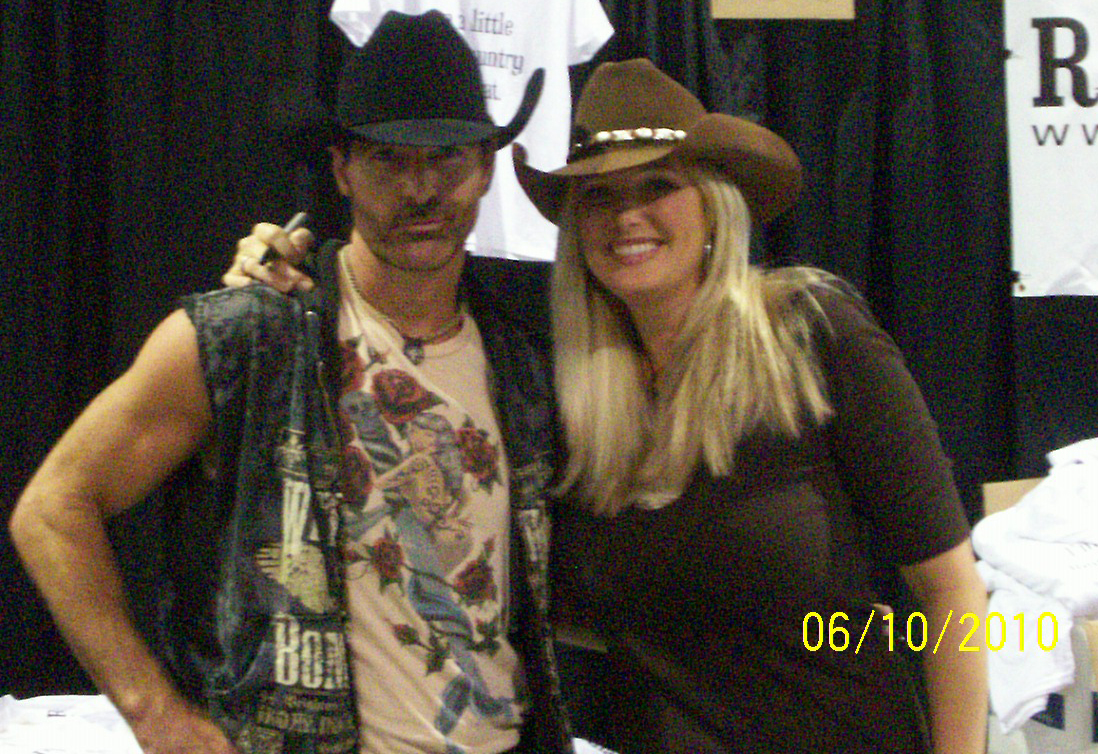
- Burns & Poe at CMA Music Festival, June 2010

Background information
- Origin: Nashville, Tennessee, U.S.
- Genres: Country
- Years active: 2007-2014
- Labels: Country Thunder, Blue Steel
- Spinoff of: Trick Pony
- Past members: Keith Burns; Michelle Poe

Burns & Poe was an American country music duo composed of Keith Burns and Michelle Poe. The duo was founded in 2007 after Burns left the group Trick Pony. Poe was once a solo artist for DreamWorks Nashville, and later played bass guitar for Dierks Bentley and Hank Williams Jr. The two met in 2007 while Burns was holding auditions to recruit a new lead singer for Trick Pony after Aubrey Collins (who had replaced original lead singer Heidi Newfield just months earlier) left.

They released a two-disc, self-titled album in late 2010 through their website, followed by a Christmas single titled "Hear the Angels Singing" in November of that year. Blue Steel Records gave it a wide release in 2011. The same year, Music Row magazine awarded them as Independent Artist of the Year. They promoted the dual album on tour in 2011. Alex Henderson of Allmusic rated the album 3 stars out of 5, saying that "they sound like they genuinely enjoy working together".

Later in 2011, Burns & Poe released a video for a fourth song, "I Need a Job". In 2014, Burns rejoined Trick Pony.

== Discography ==
=== Albums ===
| Title | Album details |
|---|---|
| Burns & Poe | Release date: April 26, 2011; Label: Blue Steel Records; Format: CD |

=== Singles ===
| Year | Single | Album |
|---|---|---|
| 2009 | "Gone as All Get Out" | Burns & Poe |
| 2009 | "It's Always a Woman" | Burns & Poe |
| 2010 | "Don't Get No Better Than That" | Burns & Poe |
| 2011 | "How Long Is Long Enough" | Burns & Poe |
| 2011 | "Second Chance" | Burns & Poe |

=== Videos ===
| Year | Video | Director |
|---|---|---|
| 2010 | "Don't Get No Better Than That" | Douglas Bruce/Stephen Shively |
| 2011 | "Second Chance" | Kelly Brooks |
| 2011 | "I Need a Job" | Steve Freeman |
