= Prayin' for Daylight =

2000 single by Rascal Flatts

Single by Rascal Flatts

from the album Rascal Flatts
- B-side: "Long Slow Beautiful Dance"
- Released: February 21, 2000
- Recorded: 1999
- Genre: Country
- Length: 3:35
- Label: Lyric Street
- Songwriters: Steve Bogard; Rick Giles
- Producers: Mark Bright; Marty Williams

Rascal Flatts singles chronology
"Prayin' for Daylight" (2000)	"This Everyday Love" (2000)

"Prayin' for Daylight" is a song written by Steve Bogard and Rick Giles and recorded by American country music group Rascal Flatts. It was released in February 2000 as the first single from the band's self-titled debut album and as their debut single. The song reached number 3 on the U.S. Billboard Hot Country Singles & Tracks (now Hot Country Songs) chart.

== Content ==
The song is a moderate up-tempo song in which the narrator's lover has just left him, and he has not been able to sleep. He also begs her to come back so he could stop the lonely nights of "prayin' for daylight."

== Background ==
On the band's website, Jay DeMarcus commented on the recording of "Prayin' For Daylight": "The first single. That was the first tune we ever cut as a group, and the first song that Lyric Street ever heard us do. It was very, very instrumental in getting our deal. We love the song. It's a very memorable kind of chorus and it just showcases what we can do as well as the band. I think if somebody said tell us what you're all about, we could play that song and they'd get a pretty good picture of what we can do. "Prayin' For Daylight" was special because at the last minute we changed the feel of the whole song. The demo was really, really different and what's become the little, hooky guitar riff, that happened moments before we went to tape."

== Chart performance ==
"Prayin' for Daylight" debuted at number 60 on the U.S. Billboard Hot Country Singles & Tracks for the week of March 4, 2000. The song spent thirty-one weeks on the U.S. Billboard Hot Country Singles & Tracks chart, reaching a peak of number 3. The single's B-side, "Long Slow Beautiful Dance," spent two weeks on the same chart in December 2000, peaking at number 73.

Chart (2000)	Peak position
Canada Country Singles (RPM)	4
US Billboard Hot 100	38
US Hot Country Songs (Billboard)	3

=== Year-end charts ===
Chart (2000)	Position
US Country Songs (Billboard)	14

== Certifications ==
Region	Certification	Certified units/sales
United States (RIAA)	Gold	500,000^{‡}
^{‡} Sales+streaming figures based on certification alone.
