= A Lot More Free =

2023 single by Max McNown

Single by Max McNown

from the album Wandering
- Released: August 25, 2023
- Genre: Country
- Length: 3:18
- Label: Fugitive
- Songwriters: Max McNown; Steve Fee; Jesse Reeves
- Producer: Fee

Max McNown singles chronology
| "I Will Belong" (2023) | "A Lot More Free" (2023) | "Rather Have a Nightmare" (2023) |

Music video
- "A Lot More Free" on YouTube

"A Lot More Free" is a song by American singer Max McNown, released on August 25, 2023 from his debut EP of the same name. It is also the lead single from his debut studio album Wandering (2024). Written by McNown, Steve Fee (who also produced the song) and Jesse Reeves, the song was a sleeper hit that gained recognition about a year after its release and became McNown's breakthrough hit.

== Background ==
In an interview with Holler Country, Max McNown stated:

"A Lot More Free" was one of those songs that hit me deeply. It seems easy to claim after its success, but if you ask a few people who are close to me they'd tell you that after writing that song I was more excited than I'd ever been. My producer Steve Fee and I talked about how it was going to be "an anthem" for those who escaped a difficult relationship, and that seems to be true.

== Composition ==
The song mostly uses acoustic guitar in the instrumental and lyrically finds Max McNown reflecting on a lost relationship. In the first verse, he describes the beginning of winter, with the difficult weather mirroring the sadness from a breakup, and the transition into spring which symbolizes his newfound hope, before comparing the seasonal change to his emotions concerning the relationship. McNown also whistles and uses dramatic pauses in some parts of the song. Drums are played during the chorus, in which McNown sings that he feels sad from the breakup but also embraces the freedom that it has allowed him. After that, McNown visualizes himself standing on a mountain, which represents him feeling free from the anguish, and likens the rivers that he sees to the "deep scars" of his relationship. He is grateful for his pain, as he has emotionally grown from it. The song also features a breakdown with harmonica.

== Promotion ==
When "A Lot More Free" was released, Max McNown made a video for the song. His sister filmed scenes of him walking in front of the Columbia River Gorge in Oregon, which led to his idea that "A Lot More Free" could be a "travel song". When people began creating videos of them traveling to their favorite places, McNown created compilation videos of their videos. When the views started decreasing, McNown posted a video of him performing the song, helping it receive widespread attention.

== Charts ==
=== Weekly charts ===
Weekly chart performance for "A Lot More Free"
| Chart (2024–2025) | Peak position |
|---|---|
| Australia (ARIA) | 56 |
| Canada (Canadian Hot 100) | 32 |
| Ireland (IRMA) | 79 |
| New Zealand Hot Singles (RMNZ) | 4 |
| Sweden Heatseeker (Sverigetopplistan) | 3 |
| UK Singles Downloads (OCC) | 21 |
| US Billboard Hot 100 | 97 |
| US Adult Pop Airplay (Billboard) | 8 |
| US Hot Country Songs (Billboard) | 29 |
| US Hot Rock & Alternative Songs (Billboard) | 15 |
| US Pop Airplay (Billboard) | 22 |

=== Year-end charts ===
Year-end chart performance for "A Lot More Free"
| Chart (2025) | Position |
|---|---|
| US Adult Pop Airplay (Billboard) | 26 |
| US Hot Country Songs (Billboard) | 97 |
| US Hot Rock & Alternative Songs (Billboard) | 14 |

== Certifications ==
| Region | Certification | Certified units/sales |
|---|---|---|
| Australia (ARIA) | Platinum | 70,000^{‡} |
| Canada (Music Canada) | 2× Platinum | 160,000^{‡} |
| United States (RIAA) | Platinum | 1,000,000^{‡} |
^{‡} Sales+streaming figures based on certification alone.
