= R.I.D.E. =

Studio album by Trick Pony
- Released: August 23, 2005
- Recorded: 2003–2005
- Studio: River Row Studio; Sound Kitchen; (Nashville, TN)
- Genre: Country
- Length: 43:38
- Label: Asylum-Curb
- Producer: Chuck Howard; Anthony L. Smith

Trick Pony chronology
On a Mission (2002)	R.I.D.E. (2005)	The Best of Trick Pony (2009)

Singles from R.I.D.E.
- 1. "The Bride" Released: June 21, 2004; 2. "It's a Heartache" Released: January 31, 2005; 3. "Ain't Wastin' Good Whiskey on You" Released: September 12, 2005

Professional ratings
Review scores
Source	Rating
AllMusic	4/5 stars

R.I.D.E. (pronounced "ride") is the third and final studio album by American country music group Trick Pony, released on August 23, 2005, via Asylum-Curb Records. The album's name is an abbreviation for "Rebellious Individuals Delivering Entertainment". After the underwhelming success of their previous album On a Mission (2002) and many management changes, the group officially left Warner Bros. Nashville in late 2003 and bought out their masters. Almost immediately, they were signed to Curb Records before being moved to the Asylum-Curb division.

Three official singles were released from the album, with the highest peaking being a cover of Bonnie Tyler's 1977 hit song "It's a Heartache". The album also peaked within the top ten of the Top Country Albums chart. This was the group's last album to feature Heidi Newfield and was actually their last studio album; they did however release an EP in 2016 titled Pony Up sans member Ira Dean.

== Songs ==
R.I.D.E. has been described as Trick Pony's most diverse album. The album opens up with "Ain't Wastin' Good Whiskey on You", which features an all-star chorus featuring Tracy Byrd, Joe Diffie, Mel Tillis, Tanya Tucker, Darryl Worley, and a few of Ira Dean's friends from Cincinnati. The third track, "It's a Heartache" is a cover originally sung by Bonnie Tyler. "When I Fall" was written by member Keith Burns and country artist Billy Dean, who is actually Dean's brother. Burns described the song as a "big, huge ballad." Track six, "The Bride" was the first single from the album and features Heidi Newfield's "throaty vocals turn on a dime." "Sad City" was a song co-written by Burns that was originally recorded by Sammy Kershaw. The song features Hootie & the Blowfish lead singer and eventual country star Darius Rucker; the group originally met Rucker at Farm Aid. Burns began playing the song in Rucker's tour bus which caught Rucker's attention; he stated to the group that if they were to ever cut it, he would want to be featured in it. "Stand in the Middle of Texas" was co-written by famed Nashville songwriter Matraca Berg. "Señorita" was a song originally recorded by rock music group Los Lonely Boys for their self-titled debut album (2004). In this song, Ira Dean and Keith Burns sing lead vocals. "Hillbilly Rich" is a "typical Trick Pony party song" that also features Dean and Burns on lead vocals; lyrically, it is a tale of a redneck who "hit it big on the lottery." This is also the only song on the album that the group's longtime producer Chuck Howard did not produce, instead being produced by co-writer Anthony Smith. "Cry, Cry, Cry" features a big-band inspired horn arrangement written by Branford Marsalis. The closing track, "Maryann's Song" is the only track co-written by Newfield and is a gospel song dedicated to her mother, who died in 2004 due to MS. The song features country legend Kris Kristofferson reading a recitation.

== Singles ==
"The Bride" was chosen as the lead single from the record on June 21, 2004, over a year before the album was actually released. It peaked at number 27 on the US Hot Country Songs chart. The group's cover of Bonnie Tyler's 1977 hit song "It's a Heartache" was released on January 31, 2005, as the second single. It was the most successful, hitting number 22 on the Billboard country chart and number 18 on the Radio & Records country chart. "Ain't Wastin' Good Whiskey on You" was the third and final single, released to airplay on September 12, 2005; it was less successful, failing to reach the top forty.

== Commercial performance ==
R.I.D.E. debuted at number four on the Top Country Albums chart with first week sales of 34,000 copies, becoming the highest debut of the week and Trick Pony's only top ten album to date. The album also debuted at number 20 on the Billboard 200. By the next week however, the album had fallen to number 11 on the former and number 85 on the latter. It spent only 10 weeks on the former chart and 4 weeks on the latter.

== Track listing ==
All tracks produced by Chuck Howard except "Hillbilly Rich", produced by Anthony Smith.

No.	Title	Writer(s)	Length
1.	"Ain't Wastin' Good Whiskey on You"	Wally Wilson; Buck Moore	2:58
2.	"What's Not to Love"	Kim Tribble; Ira Dean; David Lee Murphy	2:43
3.	"It's a Heartache"	Ronnie Scott; Steve Wolfe	3:27
4.	"When I Fall"	Billy Dean; Keith Burns	3:06
5.	"I Didn't"	Steven J. Williams; Sherrié Austin; Will Rambeaux	3:23
6.	"The Bride"	Lee Ann Burgess; Darryl Burgess; Liz Hengber	3:00
7.	"Sad City" (featuring Darius Rucker)	Burns; Mark Oliverius	3:32
8.	"Stand in the Middle of Texas"	Matraca Berg; Sharon Vaughn	3:49
9.	"Señorita"	Los Lonely Boys	3:07
10.	"Hillbilly Rich"	Anthony Smith; Dean	3:04
11.	"Once a Cowboy"	Bret Michaels; Jeffrey Steele; Shane Minor	3:48
12.	"Cry, Cry, Cry"	Steele; Dean	2:42
13.	"I Can Live with That"	Murphy; Tribble; Dean	4:18
14.	"Maryann's Song"	Heidi Newfield; Todd Woolsey	3:38

== Personnel ==
Taken from the R.I.D.E. booklet.

=== Trick Pony ===
- Keith Burns – acoustic guitar, vocals
- Ira Dean – bass guitar, acoustic guitar, vocals
- Heidi Newfield – harmonica, vocals

=== Additional musicians ===
- Larry Beaird – acoustic guitar
- Richard Bennett – acoustic guitar, electric guitar
- Jim "Moose" Brown – keyboards, organ, piano
- Steve Bryant – bass guitar
- Pat Buchanan – dobro, electric guitar
- Tracy Byrd – background vocals on "Ain't Wastin' Good Whiskey on You"
- J.T. Corenflos – electric guitar
- Joe Diffie – background vocals on "Ain't Wastin' Good Whiskey on You"
- Chris Dunn – trombone
- Shannon Forrest – drums
- Larry Franklin – fiddle
- Paul Franklin – pedal steel guitar, lap steel guitar
- Owen Hale – drums
- Aubrey Haynie – fiddle
- Tommy Harden – drums
- Johnny Hiland – electric guitar
- Jim Horn – baritone saxophone
- Bill Hullet – acoustic guitar
- Mike Johnson – pedal steel guitar
- John Jorgenson – electric guitar
- Troy Lancaster – electric guitar
- Chris Leuzinger – electric guitar
- Sam Levine – tenor saxophone
- Branford Marsalis – tenor saxophone
- Chris McHugh – drums
- Greg Morrow – drums
- Gordon Mote – keyboards, organ, piano, Wurlitzer
- Steve Nathan – organ
- Brad Paisley – electric guitar on "What Not to Love"
- Billy Panda – acoustic guitar
- Steve Patrick – trumpet
- Darius Rucker – background vocals on "Sad City"
- Milton Sledge – drums
- Anthony L. Smith – banjo
- Joe Spivey – fiddle
- Michael Spriggs – acoustic guitar
- Bobby Terry – electric guitar
- Mel Tillis – background vocals on "Ain't Wastin' Good Whiskey on You"
- Tanya Tucker – background vocals on "Ain't Wastin' Good Whiskey on You"
- John Willis – banjo, electric guitar
- Darryl Worley – background vocals on "Ain't Wastin' Good Whiskey on You"

== Charts ==
Weekly chart performance for R.I.D.E.
Chart (2005)	Peak position
US Billboard 200	20
US Top Country Albums (Billboard)	4

=== Singles ===
Year	Single	Peak chart positions	
Year	Single	US Billboard Country	US Radio & Records Country
2004	"The Bride"	27	27 (Note: "The Bride" peaked at number 25 on the magazine's Country Indicator chart.)
2005	"It's a Heartache"	22	18
2005	"Ain't Wastin' Good Whiskey on You"	42	36
