= Cry Cry ('Til the Sun Shines) =

Single by Heidi Newfield

from the album What Am I Waiting For
- Released: November 22, 2008
- Genre: Country
- Length: 3:20
- Label: Curb
- Songwriters: Marv Green; Aimee Mayo; Chris Lindsey; Hillary Lindsey
- Producer: Tony Brown

Heidi Newfield singles chronology
"Johnny & June" (2008)	"Cry Cry ('Til the Sun Shines)" (2008)	"What Am I Waiting For" (2009)

"Cry Cry ('Til the Sun Shines)" is a song originally recorded by Martina McBride on her 2007 album Waking Up Laughing. It was later recorded by American country music artist Heidi Newfield and released in November 2008 as the second single from the album What Am I Waiting For. The song reached #29 on the Billboard Hot Country Songs chart. The song was written by Marv Green, Aimee Mayo, Chris Lindsey and Hillary Lindsey.

== Chart performance ==
Chart (2008–2009)	Peak position
US Hot Country Songs (Billboard)	29
