= What Am I Waiting For =

Studio album by Heidi Newfield
- Released: August 5, 2008
- Genre: Country
- Length: 37:37
- Label: Curb
- Producer: Tony Brown

Singles from What Am I Waiting For
- 1. "Johnny & June" Released: March 31, 2008; 2. "Cry Cry ('Til the Sun Shines)" Released: November 3, 2008; 3. "What Am I Waiting For" Released: May 4, 2009

What Am I Waiting For is the only solo studio album from American country music singer Heidi Newfield, formerly the lead vocalist in the group Trick Pony. It was released on August 5, 2008, on Curb Records and produced by Tony Brown. The album's lead-off single, "Johnny & June", peaked at number 11 on the Hot Country Songs charts. This song was followed by "Cry, Cry ('Til the Sun Shines)", which peaked at number 29. What Am I Waiting For debuted on the Billboard 200 at number 10 with 34,000 copies sold in its first week.

== Content ==
"Johnny & June" is the first single release from this album. Co-written by Newfield, Stephony Smith and Deanna Bryant, this song peaked at number 11 on the Billboard country singles charts in late 2008. Following it is the number 29-peaking "Cry Cry ('Til the Sun Shines)", which Martina McBride previously recorded on her 2007 album Waking Up Laughing. The album's title track, the third single, debuted in May 2009 at number 57 before falling off the chart and re-entered the charts at number 60 in June 2009. Both it and "Nothin' Burns Like a Memory" were co-written by Ira Dean and Keith Burns, with whom Newfield previously performed as the trio Trick Pony from 1996 to 2006. Also covered on this album is "Can't Let Go", originally recorded by Lucinda Williams on her album Car Wheels on a Gravel Road.

== Reception ==
Professional ratings
Review scores
Source	Rating
Allmusic	2.5/5 stars
About.com	4/5 stars

The album has received mixed critical reviews, with favorable reviews focusing on Newfield's singing as well as the range of material in comparison to her work in Trick Pony. Ken Tucker of Billboard gave a favorable review, saying that the album showed a broader scope in subject material than the party-oriented material that she recorded in Trick Pony. Tucker thought that Brown's production worked well with the project and helped Newfield to expand her musical range. Dawn Pomento of Country Standard Time gave a favorable review as well, saying that many of the songs were strengthened by Newfield's "muscular and lithe" voice and Brown's production. About.com review Matt Sexton rated the album four stars out of five, saying that "Can't Let Go" and "Knocked Up" showed Newfield's blues influences.

Matt C., reviewing the album for Engine 145, gave it three-and-a-half stars out of five, saying that the first several tracks were ambitious, but that the album contained several weak tracks on the latter half. He highlighted "Johnny & June" as a standout track, even though he thought that its impact was diminished by previous singles whose titles were also the names of singers. "Cry Cry", which he called a "puerile self-help anthem", and "Nothing Burns Like a Memory", which he thought clashed with the album's tone, are cited in his review as the weakest tracks. Allmusic critic Thom Jurek gave it two-and-a-half out of five. Although he said that the album had generally strong songwriting throughout and referred to Newfield as a "kinetic vocalist", Jurek thought that the album was largely overproduced and lacked a distinctive sound as a result.

== Track listing ==
No.	Title	Writer(s)	Length
1.	"Can't Let Go"	Randy Weeks	3:28
2.	"When Tears Fall Down"	Al Anderson, Leslie Satcher, Heidi Newfield	4:13
3.	"Johnny & June"	Stephony Smith, Deanna Bryant, Newfield	3:36
4.	"What Am I Waiting For"	Jeffrey Steele, Keith Burns, Ira Dean, Newfield	4:21
5.	"Love Her and Lose Me"	Dean Dillon, Dale Dodson, Newfield	4:16
6.	"Cry Cry ('Til the Sun Shines)"	Chris Lindsey, Aimee Mayo, Hillary Lindsey, Marv Green	3:19
7.	"Wreck You"	Lori McKenna, Felix McTeigue	3:48
8.	"Nothin' Burns Like a Memory"	Eric Silver, Burns, Dean, Newfield	2:52
9.	"All I Wanna Do"	Anderson, Newfield	4:14
10.	"Knocked Up"	Angaleena Presley, Mark D. Sanders	3:30

== Personnel ==
As listed in liner notes.

- Ashley Cleveland – background vocals
- Leslie Craig – background vocals
- Dan Dugmore – lap steel guitar, pedal steel guitar
- Kenny Greenberg – electric guitar
- Wes Hightower – background vocals
- Kim Keyes – background vocals
- Greg Morrow – drums
- Steve Nathan – piano, Wurlitzer, synthesizer
- Heidi Newfield – lead vocals
- Kim Parent – background vocals
- Chris Rodriguez – background vocals
- Eric Silver – background vocals
- Stephony Smith – background vocals
- Judson Spence – background vocals
- Ilya Toshinsky – acoustic guitar, banjo, mandolin
- Glenn Worf – bass guitar
- Reese Wynans – Hammond B-3 organ, Wurlitzer
- Jonathan Yudkin – cello on "Johnny & June"

== Chart performance ==
=== Weekly charts ===
Chart (2008)	Peak position
US Billboard 200	10
US Top Country Albums (Billboard)	2

=== Year-end charts ===
Chart (2008)	Position
US Top Country Albums (Billboard)	48

=== Singles ===
Year	Single	Peak chart positions	
Year	Single	US Country	US
2008	"Johnny & June"	11	58
2008	"Cry Cry ('Til the Sun Shines)"	29	—
2009	"What Am I Waiting For"	57	—
"—" denotes releases that did not chart
