= George Strait (album) =

2000 studio album by George Strait

Studio album by George Strait
- Released: September 19, 2000
- Recorded: 2000
- Studio: Ocean Way Nashville and Sound Stage Studios (Nashville, TN).
- Genre: Neotraditional country
- Length: 34:25
- Label: MCA Nashville
- Producer: Tony Brown; George Strait

George Strait chronology
Latest Greatest Straitest Hits (2000)	George Strait (2000)	The Road Less Traveled (2001)

Singles from George Strait
- 1. "Go On" Released: July 10, 2000; 2. "Don't Make Me Come Over There and Love You" Released: November 21, 2000; 3. "If You Can Do Anything Else" Released: February 20, 2001

Professional ratings
Review scores
Source	Rating
Allmusic	3/5 stars

George Strait is the twentieth studio album, and the self-titled album by American country music singer George Strait, released on September 19, 2000. It was the first album of his career not to achieve Recording Industry Association of America (RIAA) platinum certification. It produced three singles for him on the Billboard Hot Country Singles & Tracks (now Hot Country Songs) charts: "Go On" at #2, "Don't Make Me Come Over There and Love You" at #17, and "If You Can Do Anything Else" at #5, making it the first album in his career since 1992's Holding My Own not to produce a number one hit.

"You're Stronger Than Me" was originally recorded by Patsy Cline in 1962.

Rodney Crowell later recorded "The Night's Just Right for Love" as "The Night's Just Right" on his 2008 album Sex & Gasoline.

== Track listing ==
No.	Title	Writer(s)	Length
1.	"If You Can Do Anything Else"	Billy Livsey, Don Schlitz	4:06
2.	"Don't Make Me Come Over There and Love You"	Jim Lauderdale, Carter Wood	2:04
3.	"Looking Out My Window Through the Pain"	John Schweers	3:39
4.	"Go On"	Tony Martin, Mark Nesler	3:48
5.	"If It's Gonna Rain"	Dean Dillon, Scotty Emerick, Donny Kees	3:46
6.	"Home Improvement"	Dana Hunt Black, Tim Ryan Rouillier	2:45
7.	"The Night's Just Right for Love"	Rodney Crowell	3:57
8.	"You're Stronger Than Me"	Hank Cochran, Jimmy Key	2:52
9.	"Which Side of the Glass"	Black, J. Fred Knobloch	3:20
10.	"She Took the Wind from His Sails"	Dillon, Kees	3:58

== Personnel ==
As listed in liner notes.

=== Musicians ===
- George Strait – lead vocals
- Steve Nathan – keyboards
- Steve Gibson – acoustic guitars, electric guitars, mandolin
- Brent Mason – acoustic guitars, electric guitars, gut-string guitar
- Paul Franklin – steel guitar
- Stuart Duncan – fiddle, mandolin
- Glenn Worf – bass guitar
- Eddie Bayers – drums
- The Nashville String Machine – strings (3, 7, 10)
- Bergen White – string arrangements and conductor (3)
- Ronn Huff – string arrangements and conductor (7, 10)
- Wes Hightower – backing vocals
- Liana Manis – backing vocals

=== Production ===
- Tony Brown – producer
- George Strait – producer
- Chuck Ainlay – recording, additional first overdub engineer, mixing
- Justin Niebank – recording, overdub recording
- Chad Brown – second engineer
- Mark Ralston – second engineer, mix assistant
- Greg Fogie – additional second engineer
- Tony Green – second overdub engineer, mix assistant
- David Bryant – additional second overdub engineer
- Leslie Richter – additional second overdub engineer
- Eric Conn – digital editing
- Carlos Grier – digital editing
- Denny Purcell – mastering
- Georgetown Masters (Nashville, Tennessee) – editing and mastering location
- Jessie Noble – project coordinator
- Erv Woolsey – management

=== Design ===
- Tom Bert – photography
- Jerry Joyner – design
- Chris Ferrara – design

== Charts ==
=== Weekly charts ===
Chart (2000)	Peak position
Canadian Country Albums (RPM)	8
US Billboard 200	7
US Top Country Albums (Billboard)	1

=== Year-end charts ===
Chart (2000)	Position
US Top Country Albums (Billboard)	30
Chart (2001)	Position
US Top Country Albums (Billboard)	36

== Certifications ==
Certifications for George Strait
Region	Certification	Certified units/sales
United States (RIAA)	Gold	500,000^{^}
^{^} Shipments figures based on certification alone.
