= Stuff (Diamond Rio song) =

Single by Diamond Rio

from the album One More Day
- Released: May 20, 2000
- Genre: Country
- Length: 3:06
- Label: Arista Nashville
- Songwriter(s): Kelly Garrett, Tim Owens
- Producer(s): Michael Clute, Diamond Rio

Diamond Rio singles chronology
"I Know How the River Feels" (1999)	"Stuff" (2000)	"One More Day" (2000)

"Stuff" is a song recorded by American country music group Diamond Rio. It was released in May 2000 as the first single from the album One More Day. The song reached #36 on the Billboard Hot Country Singles & Tracks chart. The song was written by Kelly Garrett and Tim Owens.

== Content ==
Rick Cohoon of Allmusic described the song as "a fun yet insightful tune about how we tend to measure our success in life by how many material things we accumulate."

== Chart performance ==
Chart (2000)	Peak position
US Hot Country Songs (Billboard)	36
