= I'm Movin' On (Rascal Flatts song) =

2001 single by Rascal Flatts

Single by Rascal Flatts

from the album Rascal Flatts
- Released: October 8, 2001
- Recorded: 2000
- Genre: Country
- Length: 4:04
- Label: Lyric Street
- Songwriters: Phillip White; D. Vincent Williams
- Producers: Mark Bright; Marty Williams

Rascal Flatts singles chronology
"While You Loved Me" (2001)	"I'm Movin' On" (2001)	"These Days" (2002)

Music video
- "I'm Movin' On" on YouTube

"I'm Movin' On" is a song written by Phillip White and D. Vincent Williams and recorded by American country music group Rascal Flatts. It was released on October 8, 2001, as the fourth and final single from the band's self-titled debut album. The song reached number 4 on the U.S. Billboard Hot Country Songs chart in early 2002. In 2025, Rascal Flatts re-recorded the song with Kelly Clarkson, as part of their eleventh studio album Life Is a Highway: Refueled Duets.

== Content ==
"I'm Movin' On" is a mid-tempo ballad in triple meter, accompanied by mandolin and piano. In it, the narrator starts off with stating of the troubles he's had ("I've dealt with my ghosts and I've faced all my demons"). He states that he is "at peace" with himself because he is moving out of the town in which he lives ("I never dreamed home would end up where I don't belong / I'm movin' on"). However, this could also refer to an emotional state—as in a relationship he once believed to be his "emotional" home has become a place he doesn't "belong" in.

Jay DeMarcus said of the song, "[It's] a song that just drains everything out of you."

== Recording ==
While recording the song and trying to perfect the vocals, Gary LeVox frequently became emotional, later saying "I was getting choked up recording it after singing it over and over and trying to get it right." According to Joe Don Rooney, "D. Vincent and Phillip [the writers] came in and listened to the final mix. D. Vincent had been having some tough times when he wrote that song. When he got up, he was walking out and said, 'Boys, I got to get me a beer. That one hit too close to home. But I do love it.' He shook our hands and walked out. That was very, very touching."

Garth Brooks had the song on hold initially, but decided to let Rascal Flatts have the song out of respect for Rooney — who, like Brooks, is a native of the state of Oklahoma.

== Critical reception ==
The song won the Song of the Year award at the 38th annual Academy of Country Music awards, at which Rascal Flatts also won Top Vocal Group. Joe Don Rooney, Rascal Flatts' lead guitarist, said in an interview with USA Weekend that he considers the song an example of how the band interacts with their fans: "One time, a guy told us he was addicted to drugs and was considering suicide, then he heard our song 'I'm Movin' On.' He didn't say that the song alone changed his life. But it opened his mind to the thought that he could change his life, and he did."

In 2009, Country Universe ranked the song #3 on their list of the 201 Greatest Singles of the Decade for the 2000s, with writer Tara Seetharam saying: "The lyrics alone are gripping, but they’re paired with an emotive, melancholy melody that is one of the best-composed of the decade."

== Music video ==
A music video directed by Shaun Silva was released for the song. It debuted on November 16, 2001 during CMT Most Wanted Live. The video features footage of a live performance of the song, mixed with scenes of instruments being played and various views of the band members going about their daily lives. DeMarcus is seen exiting an elevator and riding on a subway train, LeVox is frequently seen talking on the phone, and Rooney is shown in a tattoo parlor. Throughout the video, the colors of everything change frequently.

== Chart performance ==
"I'm Movin' On" debuted at number 57 on the U.S. Billboard Hot Country Singles & Tracks for the chart week of October 13, 2001.

Chart (2001–2002)	Peak position
US Hot Country Songs (Billboard)	4
US Billboard Hot 100	41

=== Year-end charts ===
Chart (2002)	Position
US Country Songs (Billboard)	15

== 2025 re-recording ==
"I'm Movin' On"

Promotional single by Rascal Flatts and Kelly Clarkson

from the album Life Is a Highway: Refueled Duets
- Released: March 14, 2025
- Genre: Country
- Length: 3:44
- Label: Big Machine
- Songwriters: Phillip White; D. Vincent Williams
- Producer: Jay DeMarcus

In 2025, Rascal Flatts re-recorded the song with pop singer Kelly Clarkson, as part of their eleventh studio album, Life Is a Highway: Refueled Duets. The song was released on March 14, 2025.

=== Background and composition ===
In March 2025, Rascal Flatts announced their eleventh studio album Life Is a Highway: Refueled Duets. To celebrate their 25th anniversary, the album will feature nine re-recordings of some of their past hits with nine other artists. On this version, Clarkson sings lead on most of the song with Gary LeVox taking over on the bridge. Rascal Flatts sings harmony through the song. This version is twenty seconds shorter and produced by Jay DeMarcus.

=== Critical reception ===
James Daykin of Entertainment Focus said of the duet, "Clarkson, meanwhile, delivers a masterclass in vocal emotion on 'I'm Movin' On.' Her voice soars and stretches the song to its emotional limits, elevating it beyond its original form. It's a grand finale that reaffirms the versatility and depth of Rascal Flatts's music."

=== Charts ===
Chart (2025)	Peak position
US Country Digital Song Sales (Billboard)	15
