= Don't Make Me Come Over There and Love You =

2000 single by George Strait

Single by George Strait

from the album George Strait
- Released: November 21, 2000
- Genre: Country
- Length: 2:04
- Label: MCA Nashville
- Songwriters: Jim Lauderdale; Carter Wood
- Producers: Tony Brown; George Strait

George Strait singles chronology
"Go On" (2000)	"Don't Make Me Come Over There and Love You" (2000)	"If You Can Do Anything Else" (2001)

Music video
- "Don't Make Me Come Over There and Love You" at CMT.com

"Don't Make Me Come Over There and Love You" is a song written by Jim Lauderdale and Carter Wood, and recorded by American country music artist George Strait. It was released in November 2000 as the second single from his self-titled album. The song reached #17 in the United States.

== Background and writing ==
Jim Lauderdale told Taste of Country that the two writers were having dinner with Tim and Tracy Coates when they came up with the song. He said that once they came up with the title, the rest of the song came easily.

== Music video ==
Strait released a music video in 2000 for the song which was directed by Gerry Wenner.

== Chart positions ==
Chart (2000–2001)	Peak position
US Hot Country Songs (Billboard)	17
US Billboard Bubbling Under Hot 100	2
