= Pour Me (Trick Pony song) =

2000 single by Trick Pony

Single by Trick Pony

from the album Trick Pony
- B-side: "If You Think You've Got Trouble"
- Released: December 4, 2000
- Genre: Rockabilly
- Length: 2:47
- Label: Warner Bros. Nashville
- Songwriters: Rory Waters Beighley; Sammy Harp Wedlock; Keith Burns; Ira Dean; Heidi Newfield
- Producer: Chuck Howard

Trick Pony singles chronology
"Pour Me" (2000)	"On a Night Like This" (2001)

"Pour Me" is the debut single by American country music group Trick Pony. The single was written by the members along with Rory Waters Beighley and Sammy Harp Wedlock, and was produced by Chuck Howard. It was released on December 4, 2000, as the lead single from the group's eponymous debut album by Warner Bros. Nashville.

== Track listing ==
CD and cassette single
No.	Title	Writer(s)	Producer(s)	Length
1.	"Pour Me" (album version)	Heidi Newfield; Keith Burns; Ira Dean; Rory Waters Beighley; Sammy Harp Wedlock	Chuck Howard	2:47
2.	"If You Think You've Got Trouble" (album version)	Dean; Burns	Howard	3:09

== Music video ==
Trick Pony's first music video was directed by Peter Zavadil. The hard-to-find video features the group in a bar and performing. It premiered to CMT on October 8, 2000.

== Charts ==
"Pour Me" debuted at number 74 on the US Billboard Hot Country Songs chart on October 21, 2000. It rose to number 67 the following week. By the end of 2000, the song had risen to a position of number 37. It peaked at number 12 on the chart on March 31, 2001 and spent 28 weeks in total.

== Charts ==
Chart (2000–2001)	Peak position
US Billboard Hot 100	71
US Hot Country Songs (Billboard)	12
US Radio Songs (Billboard)	74

=== Year-end charts ===
Chart (2001)	Position
US Country Songs (Billboard)	56
