= One More Day (Diamond Rio song) =

2000 single by Diamond Rio

Single by Diamond Rio

from the album One More Day
- B-side: "Stuff"
- Released: October 30, 2000
- Genre: Country
- Length: 3:35
- Label: Arista Nashville 69036
- Songwriters: Bobby Tomberlin; Steven Dale Jones
- Producers: Michael D. Clute; Diamond Rio

Diamond Rio singles chronology
"Stuff" (2000)	"One More Day" (2000)	"Sweet Summer" (2001)

"One More Day" is a song written by Bobby Tomberlin and Steven Dale Jones, and recorded by American country music group Diamond Rio. It was released in October 2000 as the second single and title track from their album One More Day, in addition to gaining popularity after the death of NASCAR driver Dale Earnhardt. The song reached the top of the Billboard Hot Country Singles & Tracks (now Hot Country Songs) chart. It peaked at number 29 on the Billboard Hot 100, making it a minor crossover hit. After falling from the charts, it received heavy recurrent rotation as a tribute to the people who died in the September 11 attacks.

== Content ==
The narrator has a dream that a wish was granted to him. He talks about how he didn't wish for money or anything extravagant like a "mansion in Malibu", he simply wished for one more day with his loved one.

== Critical reception ==
Keyboardist Dan Truman recalled the beginning of the songs popularity, “It all started in Los Angeles, when RCA Nashville chairman Joe Galante played six of our new songs for some RCA people who were from outside country music. When he came home, he told us he was just astounded, because after he played ‘One More Day’ everybody stood up and applauded. That’s why it was chosen for a single. And then, there it went.”

== Music video ==
The music video was shot in black and white and directed and produced by Deaton Flanigen and features Diamond Rio performing in and outside of a mansion. It also shows a model swimming in the mansion's swimming pool. The video premiered on November 2, 2000 on CMT.

== Chart performance ==
The song entered the Hot Country Singles & Tracks chart at number 68 on November 4, 2000, and spent a total of 33 weeks on that chart.

"One More Day" reached the number one position on the Billboard country chart dated for March 10, 2001, making it the group's third number one overall and their first since "How Your Love Makes Me Feel" in 1997. A week later, it fell to number two, with Toby Keith's "You Shouldn't Kiss Me Like This" — which had also been number one on the March 3 survey — reclaiming the number one spot. Keith also held the top spot on March 24, with Diamond Rio still at number two that week. Finally, on the chart dated March 31, "One More Day" returned to the number one position, giving the song a total of two non-consecutive weeks at the top of the country chart.

In addition to peaking at number 6 on the Adult Contemporary charts, "One More Day" peaked at number 29 on the Billboard Hot 100.

== Charts ==
=== Weekly charts ===
Chart (2000–2001)	Peak position
US Billboard Hot 100	29
US Adult Contemporary (Billboard)	6
US Hot Country Songs (Billboard)	1

=== Year-end charts ===
Year-end chart performance for "One More Day" by Diamond Rio
Chart (2001)	Position
Canada Radio (Nielsen BDS)	25
US Billboard Hot 100	86
US Adult Contemporary (Billboard)	15
US Hot Country Songs (Billboard)	6

== Certifications ==
Certifications for One More Day
Region	Certification	Certified units/sales
United States (RIAA)	Platinum	1,000,000^{‡}
^{‡} Sales+streaming figures based on certification alone.
