= Max McNown =

American singer

- Born: Max Winter McNown; July 20, 2001 (age 25); West Linn, Oregon, U.S.
- Genres: Country; folk rock; Americana
- Occupations: Singer-songwriter; musician
- Years active: 2023–present
- Label: Fugitive
- Website: www.maxmcnown.com

Max Winter McNown (born July 20, 2001) is an American singer-songwriter. He has charted with the singles "A Lot More Free" and "Better Me for You (Brown Eyes)".

McNown grew up in Bend, Oregon. He began his music career in 2023, signing with Fugitive Records.

== Early life ==
Max Winter McNown was born in West Linn, Oregon and later moved to Bend, Oregon. He graduated high school in 2020 and attended college for two years. In August 2022, he moved to Southern California and learned guitar.

== Career ==
In April 2023, McNown released his debut single "Freezing in November".

McNown signed with Fugitive Recordings and in August 2023, released his debut EP A Lot More Free.

In April 2024, McNown released his debut album Wandering. This was followed in September 2024 with the EP Willfully Blind.

In May 2025, McNown released the single "Same Questions".

McNown's third studio album, Leave On a Light was announced in July 2026 and scheduled for release on September 25, 2026.

== Personal life ==
He married Sallie Kate Goff on October 25, 2025. She has starred alongside him in his music videos for songs "Strong as Iron" and "Forever Ain't Long Enough". Max is the nephew to Cade McNown and Brandon Ebel, founder of Tooth & Nail Records.

== Discography ==
=== Studio albums ===
List of studio albums, with selected details
Title	Details	Peak chart positions			
Title	Details	US	AUS	CAN	UK Down.
Wandering	Released: April 12, 2024; Label: Fugitive Recordings; Formats: Digital download, streaming	—	—	68	38
Night Diving	Released: January 24, 2025; Label: Fugitive Recordings; Formats: Digital download, streaming	176	72	93	20
Leave On a Light	Released: September 25, 2026; Label: Fugitive Recordings; Formats: Digital download, streaming	—	49	—	56

=== Extended plays ===
List of extended plays, with selected details
Title	Details	Peak chart positions
Title	Details	UK Down.
A Lot More Free	Released: August 25, 2023; Label: Fugitive Recordings; Formats: Digital download, streaming	40
Willfully Blind	Released: September 20, 2024; Label: Fugitive Recordings; Formats: Digital download, streaming	—
Covers	Released: December 26, 2024; Label: Fugitive Recordings; Formats: Digital download, streaming	—
Both Sides of the Blade	Released: November 14, 2025; Label: Fugitive Recordings; Formats: Digital download, streaming	—

=== Singles ===
Title	Year	Peak chart positions										Certifications	Album
Title	Year	US	US Country	US Country Airplay	US Pop	US Rock	AUS	CAN	NZ Hot	SWE Heat.	UK Down.	Certifications	Album
"A Lot More Free"	2024	97	29	—	27	15	56	32	4	3	21	RIAA: Platinum; ARIA: Platinum; MC: 2× Platinum; RMNZ: Platinum	A Lot More Free and Wandering
"Better Me for You (Brown Eyes)"	2025	26	7	6	34	—	—	19	—	—	39	BPI: Silver; MC: Platinum; RMNZ: Platinum	Night Diving
"Done For"	2026	—	41	45	—	—	—	73	—	—	61		Leave On a Light

=== Other charted and certified songs ===
List of charted and certified songs, with selected chart positions
Title	Year	Peak chart positions	Certifications	Album
Title	Year	NZ Hot	Certifications	Album
"Love Me Back"	2024	—	MC: Platinum; RMNZ: Gold	Wandering
"St. Helens Alpenglow"	2025	38		Night Diving (The Cost of Growing Up)
"Same Questions"	2025	28		Night Diving (The Cost of Growing Up)
"The Cost of Growing Up"	2025	32		Night Diving (The Cost of Growing Up)
"Turned Into Missing You" (featuring Avery Anna)	2025	38		Non-album song
"Standstill (My My My)"	2026	40		Leave On a Light
"Heart You Didn't Break"	2026	23		Leave On a Light
"Something to Someone"	2026	27		Leave On a Light
"First Born Daughter"	2026	35		Leave On a Light
"Comets"	2026	33		Leave On a Light
