= Just What I Do =

Single by Trick Pony

from the album Trick Pony
- Released: January 11, 2002
- Recorded: 2000
- Genre: Country
- Length: 3:22
- Label: H2E; Warner Bros. Nashville
- Songwriters: Keith Burns; Ira Dean
- Producer: Chuck Howard

Trick Pony singles chronology
"On a Night Like This" (2001)	"Just What I Do" (2002)	"On a Mission" (2002)

"Just What I Do" is a song recorded by American country music group Trick Pony, taken from their self-titled debut studio album. It is one of the group's few songs in which lead singer Heidi Newfield does not sing the lead vocals, with Keith Burns instead taking lead vocals. Burns wrote the song with fellow member Ira Dean. Chuck Howard produced the track. Warner Bros. Nashville began promoting the single to country radio in January 2002 as the third and final single from the album.

The song was another hit for the group, peaking at number 13 on the US Hot Country Songs chart. It also garnered them their sole Grammy nomination, being nominated for Best Country Performance by a Duo or Group at the 45th Annual Grammy Awards in 2003; they lost the award to the Chicks' 2002 hit "Long Time Gone". The track was also nominated at the 38th ACM Awards for Single Record of the Year, losing to "The Good Stuff" by Kenny Chesney.

== Music video ==
The music video for "Just What I Do" was directed by Peter Zavadil. It debuted to CMT on April 7, 2002. It was nominated at the 2003 ACM Awards for Music Video of the Year and 2003 CMT Flameworthy Awards for Group/Duo Video of the Year, losing the former to "Drive (For Daddy Gene)" by Alan Jackson and the latter to "These Days" by Rascal Flatts.

== Commercial performance ==
"Just What I Do" debuted on the US Billboard Hot Country Songs chart the week of January 19, 2002, at number 55. It reached the top-forty the week of February 2, 2002, at number 40. It peaked at number 13 on June 1, 2002, spending 24 weeks in total on the chart. It also reached number 13 on the Radio & Records Country Top 50 while reaching number nine on that magazine's Country Indicator chart.

== Charts ==
Weekly chart performance for "Just What I Do"
Chart (2002)	Peak position
US Bubbling Under Hot 100 (Billboard)	3
US Hot Country Songs (Billboard)	13

=== Year-end charts ===
Chart (2002)	Position
US Country Songs (Billboard)	52
