= If You Can Do Anything Else =

2001 single by George Strait

Single by George Strait

from the album George Strait
- B-side: "Which Side of the Glass"
- Released: February 20, 2001
- Recorded: 2000
- Genre: Country
- Length: 4:01
- Label: MCA Nashville
- Songwriters: Billy Livsey; Don Schlitz
- Producers: Tony Brown; George Strait

George Strait singles chronology
"Don't Make Me Come Over There and Love You" (2000)	"If You Can Do Anything Else" (2001)	"Run" (2001)

"If You Can Do Anything Else" is a song written by Billy Livsey and Don Schlitz, and recorded by American country music artist George Strait. It was released in February 2001 as the third and final single from his self-titled album. The song reached number 5 on the U.S. Billboard Hot Country Singles & Tracks chart in July 2001. It also peaked at number 51 on the U.S. Billboard Hot 100.

== Chart performance ==
"If You Can Do Anything Else" debuted at number 60 on the U.S. Billboard Hot Country Singles & Tracks for the week of March 3, 2001.

Chart (2001)	Peak position
US Hot Country Songs (Billboard)	5
US Billboard Hot 100	51

=== Year-end charts ===
Chart (2001)	Position
US Country Songs (Billboard)	32
