= Sweet Summer =

Single by Diamond Rio

from the album One More Day
- B-side: "I'm Already Gone"
- Released: May 7, 2001
- Genre: Country
- Length: 4:29
- Label: Arista Nashville
- Songwriters: Neil Thrasher; Michael Dulaney
- Producers: Mike Clute; Diamond Rio

Diamond Rio singles chronology
"One More Day" (2000)	"Sweet Summer" (2001)	"That's Just That" (2001)

"Sweet Summer" is a song written by Neil Thrasher and Michael Dulaney, and recorded by American country musicgroup Diamond Rio. It was released in May 2001 as the third single from the album One More Day. It peaked at No. 18 in the United States and it also peaked at No. 4 on the U.S. Billboard Bubbling Under Hot 100.

== Content ==
In the song, the narrator recollects previous memories from the summertime. He paints a portrait of the joys of summer by talking about different summer items from an ice cream man to backyard barbecues.

== Critical reception ==
Deborah Evans Price, of Billboard magazine reviewed the song favorably calling it "the perfect summertime hit." Price also went on to say that Diamond Rio delivers the song in a "sweet, whimsical tone."

== Chart performance ==
"Sweet Summer" debuted at number 55 on the U.S. Billboard Hot Country Singles & Tracks for the chart week of May 12, 2001.

Chart (2001)	Peak position
US Hot Country Songs (Billboard)	18
US Bubbling Under Hot 100 (Billboard)	4
