= While You Loved Me =

Single by Rascal Flatts

from the album Rascal Flatts
- Released: March 26, 2001
- Recorded: 2000
- Genre: Country, Country pop
- Length: 3:16 (single edit); 3:29 (album version)
- Label: Lyric Street
- Songwriters: Kim Williams; Marty Dodson; Danny Wells
- Producers: Mark Bright; Marty Williams

Rascal Flatts singles chronology
"This Everyday Love" (2000)	"While You Loved Me" (2001)	"I'm Movin' On" (2001)

"While You Loved Me" is a song written by Kim Williams, Danny Wells and Marty Dodson and recorded by American country music group Rascal Flatts. It was released in March 2001 as the third single from the band’s self-titled debut album. The song peaked at number 7 on the U.S. Billboard Hot Country Songs chart.

== Background ==
Gary LeVox said of the song, "We got the song the night before we were going in to track the record. Mark (Bright) had called us and said, 'You've got to hear this!' When we heard it, our jaws dropped. It floored us. We were looking for a good power ballad. We had a lot that we had on hold. Because we all love ballads so much. It's got to be one that's real special."

== Chart performance ==
"While You Loved Me" debuted at number 48 on the U.S. Billboard Hot Country Singles & Tracks for the chart week of March 31, 2001.

Chart (2001)	Peak position
US Hot Country Songs (Billboard)	7
US Billboard Hot 100	60

=== Year-end charts ===
Chart (2001)	Position
US Country Songs (Billboard)	38
