= Trick Pony (album) =

Studio album by Trick Pony
- Released: March 13, 2001
- Genre: Country
- Length: 43:38
- Label: Warner Bros. Nashville
- Producer: Chuck Howard

Trick Pony chronology
Trick Pony (2001)	On a Mission (2002)

Singles from Trick Pony
- 1. "Pour Me" Released: December 4, 2000; 2. "On a Night Like This" Released: May 7, 2001; 3. "Every Other Memory" Released: December 2001 (Canada only); 4. "Just What I Do" Released: January 19, 2002

Trick Pony is the debut studio album by American country music group Trick Pony. It was produced by Chuck Howard and released on March 13, 2001, through Warner Bros. Nashville.

The album was positively reviewed by music critics. Three singles were released in total. "Pour Me" was the group's debut single, peaking at number 12 on the US Hot Country Songs chart and number 71 on the Billboard Hot 100. "On a Night like This" became the group's biggest single, peaking at number 4 on the Hot Country Songs. "Just What I Do" peaked at number 13 on the country charts and its music video was nominated at the 2003 CMT Flameworthy Awards for Group/Duo Video of the Year. The song itself was also nominated at the 45th Annual Grammy Awards for Best Country Duo/Group Performance.

The album peaked at number 12 on the Top Country Albums chart and spent 104 weeks in total. Included on this album is a cover of Johnny Cash's "Big River" which features both Cash and Waylon Jennings.

== Background ==
Trick Pony formed back in 1996 by guitarist Keith Burns, who was at the time playing with Joe Diffie's band. He wanted a group in which it would be made up of three distinct and unique members. He approached bassist Ira Dean, who was working with Tanya Tucker at the time as well; he liked him due to his unique style, sense of humor, and musical abilities. Heidi Newfield was brought on after a conversation with Burns' then-wife. All three of them had been in Nashville for years without success. Eventually, Dean was fired from Tucker's band and Burns left Diffie's band. Eventually, a demo tape reached the hands of Chuck Howard, an executive at Warner Bros. Nashville; he would sign them to the label in early 2000. There were initial concerns over the band due to fears that country radio wouldn't play them as they were not doing the country-pop sound that was popular in the genre at the time.

== Content ==
Lead singer Heidi Newfield compared the group to Fleetwood Mac during an interview with The Free Lance–Star magazine. While Newfield sings lead vocals on nearly all the songs, there is a big exception; on the song "Just What I Do", Keith Burns sings lead vocals.

== Critical reception ==
Professional ratings
Review scores
Source	Rating
AllMusic	4/5 stars
Entertainment Weekly	B

Trick Pony debuted to positive reviews from music critics. AllMusic's Liana Jones gave a positive review, comparing Newfield's sound to artists like Dolly Parton and Bonnie Raitt. They called it an "impressive first effort by a group that promises to have more shots of whiskey and good songs up their sleeves." Ken Rosenbaum of the Toledo Blade gave a positive review, ending his review by saying "It comes together with freshness and exuberance." The New-England located The Day named it as one of the best albums of 2001, saying that the trio "rocks with attitude and an infectious sense of fun."

== Commercial performance ==
Trick Pony debuted at its peak position of number 12 on the Top Country Albums chart, scanning 17,000 copies. This would go on to break a record for highest first week sales by a duo/group's debut album, surpassing the 11,000 Rascal Flatts had sold with their eponymous album. The sales led the album to skip the Heatseekers Albums and chart at number 91 on the Billboard 200, where it peaked. In total, the record would spend 104 weeks on the country albums chart. It is their most successful album to date, being certified Gold for 500,000 shipments by the RIAA.

== Track listing ==
All songs produced by Chuck Howard

No.	Title	Writer(s)	Length
1.	"Pour Me"	Rory Waters Beighley; Sammy Harp Wedlock; Keith Burns; Ira Dean; Heidi Newfield	2:49
2.	"Party of One"	Karen Staley; Dean; Doug Kahan	3:17
3.	"Big River" (featuring Johnny Cash and Waylon Jennings)	Johnny Cash	3:34
4.	"Every Other Memory"	Staley; Dean; Kahan	3:49
5.	"More Like Me"	Burns; Dean; Newfield	3:22
6.	"Just What I Do"	Burns; Dean	3:22
7.	"Stay in This Moment"	Lewis Anderson; George Teren	3:32
8.	"On a Night Like This"	Staley; Kahan	3:30
9.	"One in a Row"	Burns; Dean	2:58
10.	"Now Would Be the Time"	Burns; Dean	4:27
11.	"Can't Say That on the Radio"	Dawna Bradford; Burns	3:39
12.	"Spent"	David Lee Murphy; Kim Tribble	2:42
13.	"Not Hidden Track"		2:37
Total length:			43:38

== Personnel ==
=== Trick Pony ===
- Keith Burns – acoustic guitar, lead guitarist, lead vocals on “Just What I Do”
- Ira Dean – upright bass, bass guitar, percussion, vocals
- Heidi Newfield – vocals, harmonica, acoustic guitar

=== Additional musicians ===
- Kenny Aronoff – drums
- Daniel Blank – fiddle
- Pat Buchanan – electric guitar
- Johnny Cash – vocals on "Big River"
- Shannon Forrest – drums
- Larry Franklin – fiddle
- Aubrey Haynie – fiddle
- John Hobbs – keyboards
- Waylon Jennings – vocals on "Big River"
- John Jorgenson – electric guitar
- Steve Nathan – keyboards
- Brian Nelson – percussion
- Jimmy Nichols – keyboards
- Russ Pahl – electric guitar, steel guitar
- Tom Roady – percussion
- Brad Ruthven – electric guitar
- Michael Spriggs – acoustic guitar
- Travis Moon – Voice of Disc Jockey on "You Can't Say That on the Radio"

== Charts ==
=== Weekly charts ===
Chart (2001)	Peak position
US Billboard 200	91
US Top Country Albums (Billboard)	12

=== Year-end charts ===
Chart (2001)	Position
US Top Country Albums (Billboard)	33
Chart (2002)	Position
US Top Country Albums (Billboard)	30
