= This Everyday Love =

Single by Rascal Flatts

from the album Rascal Flatts
- Released: August 7, 2000
- Recorded: 2000
- Genre: Country
- Length: 3:05
- Label: Lyric Street
- Songwriters: Danny Wells; Gene Nelson
- Producers: Mark Bright; Marty Williams

Rascal Flatts singles chronology
"Prayin' for Daylight" (2000)	"This Everyday Love" (2000)	"While You Loved Me" (2001)

"This Everyday Love" is a song written by Gene Nelson and Danny Wells, and recorded by American country music group Rascal Flatts. It was released in August 2000 as the second single from the band’s self-titled debut album. The song peaked at number 9 on the U.S. Billboard Hot Country Tracks and Singles chart.

== Content ==
The song shows how a man feels as he goes through his day and that he can never get too much of the love he gets every day.

Joe Don Rooney says of the song: "'Everyday Love' is a kind of second version of 'Prayin' for Daylight'. Actually it's just an uptempo song with lots of vocals all over the place. It's kind of a different groove though. I think those two songs from the get-go showcase all of our influences which, i.e. all three have almost exactly the same influences. I grew up in Oklahoma and they grew up in Ohio, yet we lived kind of the same lives."

== Music video ==
The music video was directed by Trey Fanjoy. It features the group in a bowling alley. It was the first number one video on the first episode of CMT's Top 20 Countdown in 2001.

== Chart performance ==
"This Everyday Love" debuted at number 72 on the U.S. Billboard Hot Country Singles & Tracks for the chart week of August 12, 2000.

Chart (2000–2001)	Peak position
Canada Country Singles (RPM)	48 (Note: "This Everyday Love" had not yet peaked when RPM ceased publication in November 2000.)
US Hot Country Songs (Billboard)	9
US Billboard Hot 100	56

=== Year-end charts ===
Chart (2001)	Position
US Country Songs (Billboard)	46
