= One More Day (album) =

Studio album by Diamond Rio
- Released: February 6, 2001
- Recorded: 1999–2000
- Studios: The Sound Kitchen (Franklin, Tennessee); Starstruck Studios and Midtown Tone & Volume (Nashville, Tennessee)
- Genre: Country
- Length: 46:54
- Label: Arista Nashville
- Producers: Mike Clute; Diamond Rio

Diamond Rio chronology
Unbelievable (1998)	One More Day (2001)	Completely (2002)

Singles from One More Day
- 1. "Stuff" Released: May 20, 2000; 2. "One More Day" Released: October 30, 2000; 3. "Sweet Summer" Released: May 7, 2001; 4. "That's Just That" Released: September 2001

Professional ratings
Review scores
Source	Rating
About.com	(favorable)
AllMusic	3/5 stars
Chicago Tribune	(average)
Country Weekly	(positive)
Entertainment Weekly	B

One More Day is the sixth studio album by American country music band Diamond Rio. It was released in 2001. Although its lead-off single "Stuff" peaked at #36 on the Hot Country Songs charts, the title track, "One More Day", became popular on radio after the death of Dale Earnhardt, and went on to become a Number One country hit. Also released from this album were "Sweet Summer" and "That's Just That". "I'm Trying" was previously recorded by Kevin Sharp on his 1998 album Love Is, and later by Martina McBride on her 2009 album Shine.

== Recording ==
One More Day was recorded in 18 months. The band discussed their view of the album on Arista's website in 2000. "We feel like we've got the best group of songs that we've ever had on record," said Dana Williams. "Every time we do a record, we feel that way—if you don't, then there's something wrong." The group made a conscious effort to conquer new musical territory with this project. "Part of what we set out to do on this record was to do something that we hadn't done before, and try to approach things in a different manner," said Gene Johnson. "Dana and I approached the harmony vocals differently. In fact, we did a lot of harmony vocals on this album; there's not a whole lot of Marty by himself." Johnson continued, "We have unique instrumentation, and we're all distinctive players. So one of the things we didn't want to do was get too much light material. We wanted it to be pretty serious." The album's intended title was to be "Stuff" after the title of the first single.. The commercial failure of that single caused the title and original track listing of the album to be changed.

== Track listing ==
No.	Title	Writer(s)	Length
1.	"That's Just That"	Tim Owens, Kelly Garrett	2:32
2.	"One More Day"	Bobby Tomberlin, Steven Dale Jones	3:35
3.	"Sweet Summer"	Neil Thrasher, Michael Dulaney	4:29
4.	"I'm Already Gone"	Phil Vassar, Annie Roboff	3:28
5.	"I Could Do It with My Eyes Closed"	Thrasher, Trey Bruce	2:55
6.	"'Til the Heartache's Gone"	Jeffrey Steele, Al Anderson, John Hobbs	2:57
7.	"Here I Go Fallin'"	Steele, Chris Farren	3:30
8.	"I Think I Love You"	Steve Bogard, Marv Green	3:20
9.	"Hearts Against the Wind"	JD Souther	4:58
10.	"You Make Me Feel"	Skip Ewing, Bob DiPiero	3:51
11.	"The Love of a Woman"	Mark Alan Springer, A. J. Masters, Thomas Cain	3:59
12.	"I'm Trying" (featuring Chely Wright)	Darrell Scott, Tia Sillers	4:10
13.	"Stuff"	Owens, Garrett	3:06

== Personnel ==
Diamond Rio

- Marty Roe – lead vocals
- Dan Truman – keyboards
- Jimmy Olander – acoustic guitars, electric guitars
- Gene Johnson – mandolin, harmony vocals
- Dana Williams – bass, harmony vocals
- Brian Prout – drums

Guest musicians

- Ron Saltmarsh – keyboard sound design
- Chely Wright – lead and harmony vocals on "I'm Trying"

== Production ==
- Diamond Rio – producers
- Mike Clute – producer, engineer, mixing
- Peter Miskinis – tracking assistant, overdub assistant, mix assistant
- Travis Allen – overdub assistant
- Jimmy Olander – additional guitar tracking
- Glenn Meadows – mastering at Masterfonics (Nashville, Tennessee)
- Beth Lee – art direction
- Sally Carns – design
- Jim "Señor" McGuire – photography
- Mary Beth Felts – grooming
- Claudia Fowler – stylist
- Dreamcatcher Artist Management – management

== Charts ==
=== Weekly charts ===
Chart (2001)	Peak position
US Billboard 200	36
US Top Country Albums (Billboard)	5

=== Year-end charts ===
Chart (2001)	Position
Canadian Country Albums (Nielsen SoundScan)	61
US Top Country Albums (Billboard)	22
Chart (2002)	Position
US Top Country Albums (Billboard)	59

== Certifications ==
Certifications for One More Day
Region	Certification	Certified units/sales
United States (RIAA)	Gold	500,000^{^}
^{^} Shipments figures based on certification alone.
