= Rascal Flatts (album) =

Studio album by Rascal Flatts
- Released: June 6, 2000
- Recorded: November 1999 – January 2000
- Genre: Country pop
- Length: 43:33
- Label: Lyric Street
- Producers: Mark Bright; Marty Williams

Rascal Flatts chronology
Rascal Flatts (2000)	Melt (2002)

Singles from Rascal Flatts
- 1. "Prayin' for Daylight" Released: February 21, 2000; 2. "This Everyday Love" Released: August 7, 2000; 3. "While You Loved Me" Released: March 26, 2001; 4. "I'm Movin' On" Released: October 8, 2001

Rascal Flatts is the debut studio album by American country music group Rascal Flatts, released on June 6, 2000, by Lyric Street Records. It sold 2,303,000 in the United States up to May 2009, and has been certified 2× Platinum by the RIAA.

The album produced four singles on the Billboard country charts in "Prayin' for Daylight", "This Everyday Love", "While You Loved Me" and "I'm Movin' On", all of which charted in the Top Ten on the Billboard Hot Country Songs charts. "Long Slow Beautiful Dance" also charted.

== Track listing ==
No.	Title	Writer(s)	Length
1.	"Prayin' for Daylight"	Steve Bogard; Rick Giles	3:40
2.	"This Everyday Love"	Danny Wells; Gene Nelson	3:08
3.	"While You Loved Me"	Wells; Kim Williams; Marty Dodson	3:29
4.	"Some Say"	Don Pfrimmer; Danny Orton	4:00
5.	"See Me Through"	Gary LeVox; Bruce Miller; Eddie Schwartz	6:28
6.	"One Good Love"	Annie Roboff; Marcus Hummon	3:53
7.	"It's Not Just Me"	Jay DeMarcus; Hummon	3:58
8.	"Waiting All My Life"	Tommy Lee James; Rob Mathes	3:11
9.	"From Time to Time"	Rich Alves; Bill Rice	3:52
10.	"Long Slow Beautiful Dance"	Kevin Fisher; Fred Wilhelm	4:00
11.	"I'm Movin' On"	Phillip White; D. Vincent Williams	4:06
Total length:			43:33

== Personnel ==
Rascal Flatts

- Jay DeMarcus – backing vocals, bass guitar, lead vocals (10)
- Gary LeVox – lead vocals
- Joe Don Rooney – backing vocals, lead vocals (10)

Additional musicians

- Tim Akers – keyboards (2–8, 11)
- Larry Beaird – acoustic guitar
- Mike Brignardello – bass guitar (2–8, 11)
- Joe Chemay – bass guitar (1, 10)
- Paul Franklin – steel guitar
- Dann Huff – electric guitar (2–4, 6, 7)
- George Marinelli Jr. – electric guitar (1, 9, 10)
- Brent Mason – electric guitar (1, 2, 5–11)
- Brian Siewert – keyboards (1, 9, 10)
- Lonnie Wilson – drums
- Jonathan Yudkin – mandolin, fiddle, cello, viola, violin

Production

- Mark Bright – producer
- John Guess – mixing
- Mike "Frog" Griffith – production coordinator
- Sherri Halford – art direction
- Russ Harrington – photography
- Greg McCarn – art direction
- Christopher Rowe – engineer
- Shawn Simpson – engineer
- Glenn Sweitzer – design
- Ann Waters – stylist
- Marty Williams – producer, engineer, mixing, mastering
- Debra Wingo – hair stylist, make-up

== Chart performance ==
=== Weekly charts ===
Chart (2000–02)	Peak position
Canadian Country Albums (RPM)	14
US Billboard 200	43
US Top Country Albums (Billboard)	3

=== Year-end charts ===
Chart (2000)	Position
US Top Country Albums (Billboard)	49
Chart (2001)	Position
Canadian Country Albums (Nielsen SoundScan)	97
US Top Country Albums (Billboard)	26
Chart (2002)	Position
Canadian Country Albums (Nielsen SoundScan)	38
US Billboard 200	172
US Top Country Albums (Billboard)	18

=== Singles ===
Year	Single	Peak chart positions	
Year	Single	US Country	US
2000	"Prayin' for Daylight"^{[A]}	3	38
2000	"This Everyday Love"	9	56
2001	"While You Loved Me"	7	60
2001	"I'm Movin' On"	4	41

Notes

- A "Prayin' for Daylight" peaked at number 4 on the RPM Country Tracks chart in Canada.

== Certifications ==
Region	Certification
United States (RIAA)	2× Platinum
