= On a Mission (Trick Pony song) =

Single by Trick Pony

from the album On a Mission
- Released: August 26, 2002
- Genre: Country
- Length: 3:00
- Label: Warner Bros. Nashville
- Songwriters: Ira Dean; David Lee Murphy; Kim Tribble
- Producer: Chuck Howard

Trick Pony singles chronology
"Just What I Do" (2002)	"On a Mission" (2002)	"A Boy Like You" (2003)

"On a Mission" is a song recorded by American country music group Trick Pony. The song was written by member Ira Dean along with David Lee Murphy, and Kim Tribble and produced by Chuck Howard. It was released on August 26, 2002, as the lead single from the group's second studio album On a Mission (2002).

It reached number 19 on the US Hot Country Songs chart, becoming their fourth and final top-20 hit.

== Content ==
"On a Mission" is an up-beat song about the narrator happily celebrating her breakup by going to a bar and causing a scene so she can forget the night.

The song is set in the key of Eb major with a vocal range of Eb3–Db5, with a tempo of 160bpm.

== Music video ==
The music video was directed by Gerry Wenner and premiered on September 22, 2002, to CMT.

== Commercial performance ==
"On a Mission" debuted on the US Billboard Hot Country Songs chart the week of August 31, 2002, at number 58. It reached number 19 on the chart on January 11, 2003, spending 24 weeks in total.

== Charts ==
=== Weekly charts ===
Weekly chart performance for "On a Mission"
Chart (2002–2003)	Peak position
US Bubbling Under Hot 100 (Billboard)	10
US Hot Country Songs (Billboard)	19

=== Year-end charts ===
2002 year-end chart positions for "On a Mission"
Chart (2002)	Position
US Country Songs (Billboard)	99

2003 year-end chart positions for "On a Mission"
Chart (2003)	Position
US Country Songs (Billboard)	87
