= Better Me for You (Brown Eyes) =

2024 single by Max McNown

Single by Max McNown

from the album Night Diving
- Released: November 15, 2024
- Recorded: 2024
- Genre: Country
- Length: 3:14
- Label: Fugitive
- Songwriters: Max McNown; Jamie Kenney; Trent Dabbs; Ava Suppelsa
- Producer: Jamie Kenney

Max McNown singles chronology
"Hotel Bible" (2024)	"Better Me for You (Brown Eyes)" (2024)	"Call Me If You Miss Me" (2025)

"Better Me for You (Brown Eyes)" is a song by American singer Max McNown, released on November 15, 2024, as the third single from his second studio album, Night Diving (2025). It was written by McNown, Jamie Kenney (who also produced the song), Trent Dabbs and Ava Suppelsa.

== Background and composition ==
The song was composed in May 2024. At the time, Max McNown was living in Oregon and had recently started a long-distance relationship. When his co-writers asked him about his life for song ideas, McNown decided to write about how he felt about his girlfriend. They began playing a bright midtempo groove on acoustic guitars. McNown had already written the phrase "I didn't know you'd have brown eyes", which became the opening line of the chorus, where McNown also describes her as strong and "deeper than a coal mine". The closing line of the chorus, "I gotta find a better me for you", was developed from McNown being inspired by his girlfriend to become a better person.

After finishing the chorus, the writers focused on the opening verse, in which the protagonist remembers a period in his past that was defined by unhealthy alcohol use and romantic encounters that were not serious. It essentially depicts his darker side before meeting his lover. The second verse begins with a metaphor of "dipping toes in the water" and is a reflection of a period when McNown worked at a coffee shop and was unwilling to make serious commitments. The writers completed the song with a bridge that starts with a descending melody, like the chorus, but with subtle differences. In this section, McNown inserted a reference to the long-distance relationship. His co-writers feared it would be confusing for listeners as this piece of information was not made known earlier in the song, but McNown insisted it fit him and they decided to follow his judgment. Consisting of five lines, the bridge finds McNown pledging his undying love.

When the song was finished, McNown remained at Jamie Kenney's studio in Berry Hill, Tennessee and they worked through a rough demo of the song that used acoustic guitars and makeshift percussion to create a "blurry picture" which they wanted. McNown also added a scratch vocal with fragile falsetto, before returning to Oregon. Kenney continued work on the production in Nashville. He added more instruments, then enlisted Todd Lombardo to overdub banjo and rubber-bridge acoustic guitar; Aaron Sterling for the core drums; and Jedd Hughes to add electric guitars. Kenney inserted Dobro and a slide-guitar sample into the background. As Kenney worked to find a balance between the acoustics and electrics, McNown moved to Nashville and lived in a room at the studio for six months. He re-recorded his vocals three times before he was satisfied. They ended up using much of the original recording because of a "bit of freshness to it". Kenney enhanced the falsetto parts with a mandolin in the first chorus and electric guitar in the second to create a dreamy mood.

McNown introduced the song on the video-sharing app TikTok, beginning with short performances centering around the line "I didn't know you'd have brown eyes". As the song grew in popularity, he inserted "(Brown Eyes)" into the title for the song to make it easier to find. McNown originally did not plan on releasing the song as a single, but his uncle and manager, Brandon Ebel, convinced him to. Fugitive Recordings and Magnolia Music Group's promotion department sent the song to country radio via PlayMPE on December 16, 2024.

== Live performances ==
Max McNown performed the song on The Kelly Clarkson Show on February 24, 2025.

== Charts ==
=== Weekly charts ===
Weekly chart performance for "Better Me for You (Brown Eyes)"
Chart (2024–2026)	Peak position
Canada (Canadian Hot 100)	19
Canada AC (Billboard)	21
Canada Country (Billboard)	1
UK Indie Breakers (OCC)	16
UK Singles Sales (OCC)	63
US Billboard Hot 100	26
US Adult Contemporary (Billboard)	29
US Adult Pop Airplay (Billboard)	10
US Country Airplay (Billboard)	6
US Hot Country Songs (Billboard)	7
US Pop Airplay (Billboard)	34

=== Year-end charts ===
Year-end chart performance for "Better Me for You (Brown Eyes)"
Chart (2025)	Position
US Hot Country Songs (Billboard)	35

== Certifications ==
Certifications for "Better Me for You (Brown Eyes)"
Region	Certification	Certified units/sales
Canada (Music Canada)	Platinum	80,000^{‡}
New Zealand (RMNZ)	Platinum	30,000^{‡}
United Kingdom (BPI)	Silver	200,000^{‡}
^{‡} Sales+streaming figures based on certification alone.
