= On a Mission (Trick Pony album) =

Studio album by Trick Pony
- Released: November 5, 2002
- Recorded: 2002
- Genre: Contemporary country; Neotraditional country
- Length: 41:21
- Label: Warner Bros. Nashville; H2E
- Producer: Chuck Howard

Trick Pony chronology
Trick Pony (2001)	On a Mission (2002)	R.I.D.E. (2005)

Singles from On a Mission
- 1. "On a Mission" Released: August 26, 2002; 2. "A Boy Like You" Released: March 24, 2003

On a Mission is the second studio album by American country music group Trick Pony. It was released on November 5, 2002, via Warner Bros. Nashville; it was their final release for the label before being dropped in 2003 and signing to Asylum-Curb Records. Chuck Howard produced the album.

The album was favorably reviewed, although it was seen as interchangeable from their eponymous debut album. Two singles in total were released, the title track and "A Boy Like You". While the former, which was co-written by David Lee Murphy, peaked within the top-20 on the US Hot Country Songs chart, the latter became their first single to miss the top-40 of the chart. The album was also not as successful as their debut, peaking at number 13 on the Top Country Albums, but spending less weeks in total.

The song "Nobody Ever Died of a Broken Heart" would be recorded and released by the country group Cowboy Crush, which became a charting single for them in 2006. The song "Whiskey River", made famous by Willie Nelson, was covered here and features the musician as well.

== Content ==
Lead singer Heidi Newfield noted that the group experimented a little bit more with the album. She stated, "I feel like there was a little bit more confidence about all three of us, both instrumentally and vocally. I feel more confident and like my feet were underneath me a little more." Speaking of including Willie Nelson on the album, Newfield stated that "We thought of all the great songs that [Willie Nelson] he's cut, which one we should do, and in the same breath, all three of us said 'Whiskey River,' even though he didn't write that." In a phone interview for Country Standard Time, Newfield noted the dark autobiographical nature of the song "The Devil and Me", which was co-penned by member Ira Dean.

== Singles ==
The title cut "On a Mission" was released on August 26, 2002 as the lead single from the project, penned by David Lee Murphy, Kim Tribble, and member Ira Dean. It debuted on the US Billboard Hot Country Songs chart (then titled "Hot Country Singles & Tracks") the week of August 31, 2002 at number 58. It would slowly rise to the number-19 position on the chart the week of January 11, 2003, spending 24 weeks in total. The "slower and sultry" song, "A Boy Like You", was serviced to country radio on March 24, 2003 as the second and final single from the album. It debuted the chart the week of April 5, 2003 at number 58. It reached a peak of number 47 on May 10, 2003, becoming to date their lowest-peaking single. Following this song's failure along with label restructuring at the time, the group left Warner Bros. Nashville and signed a deal with Curb Records in late 2003 before being moved to Asylum-Curb Records in May 2004.

== Critical reception ==
Professional ratings
Review scores
Source	Rating
AllMusic	3/5 stars

On a Mission was reviewed favorably by music critics. Ray Waddell of Billboard magazine gave a positive review, ending his review by saying, "A perfect blend of old-school attitude and contemporary flair, we should all just stand back and let this Pony run." Robert L. Doerschuk of AllMusic reviewed it favorably but disliked what he seemed to be the "thrown-together quality" of the album, comparing it to collaborator Nelson's recent music at the time. Rick Teverbaugh of Country Standard Time gave it also a favorable review, noting that although it was similar to their debut album, it was still able to hold up on its own. He ended by saying, "The real appeal of the first record was that intangible ability to make the listener smile at the unashamed enthusiasm with which they approach their work. That too hasn't changed."

== Commercial performance ==
On a Mission peaked at number 13 on the Top Country Albums chart, selling 23,000 copies in its first week. That same week, it peaked at number 61 on the Billboard 200. The album would go on to spend 31 weeks on the country chart.

== Track listing ==
All songs produced by Chuck Howard

No.	Title	Writer(s)	Length
1.	"On a Mission"	David Lee Murphy; Kim Tribble; Ira Dean	2:58
2.	"Nobody Ever Died of a Broken Heart"	Wally Wilson; Kenny Greenberg; Terry Radigan	2:50
3.	"I'm Not Thinkin' Straight Anymore"	Keith Burns; Mark Oliverius	3:08
4.	"Love Is a Ball"	Burns; Ira Dean	2:37
5.	"Love Be Still"	Burns; Ira Dean; Ivy Dean; Heidi Newfield	4:15
6.	"A Boy Like You"	Tom Shapiro; Rivers Rutherford; Newfield	3:26
7.	"Hillbilly Blues"	Murphy; Tribble; Ira Dean	2:38
8.	"Leavin' Seems to Be the Goin' Thing"	Burns; Ira Dean; James Garrett	3:14
9.	"Rain"	Sonny LeMaire; Joshua Ragsdale	4:56
10.	"Whiskey River" (featuring Willie Nelson)	Johnny Bush; Paul Stroud	3:57
11.	"The Devil and Me"	Karen Staley; Ira Dean	3:52
12.	"Fast Horse"	Murphy; Tribble; Ira Dean	3:30
Total length:			41:21

== Personnel ==
=== Trick Pony ===
- Keith Burns - acoustic guitar, vocals
- Ira Dean - bass guitar, electric guitar, vocals
- Heidi Newfield - harmonica, vocals

=== Additional Musicians ===
- Kenny Aronoff - drums
- Bruce Bouton - pedal steel guitar
- Pat Buchanan - electric guitar
- Shannon Forrest - drums
- Rob Hajacos - fiddle
- John Hobbs - keyboards
- John Jorgenson - electric guitar
- Randy Kohrs - dobro
- Andy Leftwich - fiddle
- Brian Nelson - drums
- Willie Nelson - acoustic guitar and vocals on "Whiskey River"
- Michael Spriggs - acoustic guitar
- Jonathan Yudkin - violin

== Charts ==
=== Weekly charts ===
Chart (2002)	Peak position
US Billboard 200	61
US Top Country Albums (Billboard)	13

=== Year-end charts ===
Chart (2003)	Position
US Top Country Albums (Billboard)	63

=== Singles ===
Year	Song	Chart positions	
Year	Song	US Country	US
2002	"On a Mission"	19	110
2003	"A Boy Like You"	47	—
"—" denotes releases that did not chart.
