= On a Night like This (Trick Pony song) =

"On a Night Like This"

Single by Trick Pony

from the album Trick Pony
- B-side: "Pour Me" (acoustic version)
- Released: May 7, 2001
- Genre: Country pop
- Length: 3:30
- Label: H2E; Warner Bros. Nashville
- Songwriters: Doug Kahan; Karen Staley
- Producer: Chuck Howard

Trick Pony singles chronology
"Pour Me" (2000)	"On a Night Like This" (2001)	"Just What I Do" (2002)

"On a Night Like This" is a song by American country music group Trick Pony. It was released on May 7, 2001, as the second single from the group's debut studio album. It was written by Doug Kahan and Karen Staley and produced by Chuck Howard.

It became the group's only top ten hit on the US Hot Country Songs chart, peaking at number four. The song also reached number 47 on the Billboard Hot 100.

== Critical reception ==
Billboard gave the song a positive review saying, "The track swells nicely to a mid- to uptempo treatise on braving the pitfalls of love in an effort to reap the rewards. The interplay of vocals, spoken-word, and music is a little different and should stand out from the usual fare."

== Music video ==
A screenshot of the music video for "On a Night Like This".

Peter Zavadil, who also directed the video for "Pour Me", would return to direct the video for "On a Night Like This", filming it in Los Angeles, California. The video would make its debut to CMT on June 3, 2001.

The video for "On a Night Like This" was hugely popular, becoming the second most viewed video on CMT for the week of October 14, 2001. The video received a nomination at the 2001 Billboard Music Video Awards for "Best new artist clip of the year."

== Track listing ==
CD single
No.	Title	Writer(s)	Length
1.	"On a Night Like This"	Doug Kahan; Karen Staley	3:30
2.	"Pour Me" (acoustic version)	Heidi Newfield; Keith Burns; Ira Dean; Rory Waters Beighley; Sammy Harp Wedlock	2:44

== Commercial performance ==
"On a Night Like This" debuted on the US Billboard Hot Country Songs chart the week of May 5, 2001, at number 56. It reached its peak position of number 4 on October 27, 2001, where it stayed for four consecutive weeks, spending 33 weeks in total on the chart. The song also reached number 4 on the Radio & Records Country Top 50, while topping that magazine's Country Indicator chart for two weeks. The song crossed over at number 47 on both the US Billboard Hot 100 and Hot 100 Airplay chart. In March 2006, the song would received a Spin Award from Broadcast Data Systems for 200,000 spins.

== Charts ==
=== Weekly charts ===
Weekly chart performance for "On a Night Like This"
Chart (2001)	Peak position
US Billboard Hot 100	47
US Hot Country Songs (Billboard)	4
US Hot Country Singles Sales (Billboard)	3
US Hot Singles Sales (Billboard)	35

=== Year-end charts ===
Year-end chart performance for "On a Night Like This"
Chart (2001)	Position
US Country Songs (Billboard)	25
US Hot Country Singles Sales (Billboard)	15
US Country (Radio & Records)	35
