= Trick Pony =

American country music group

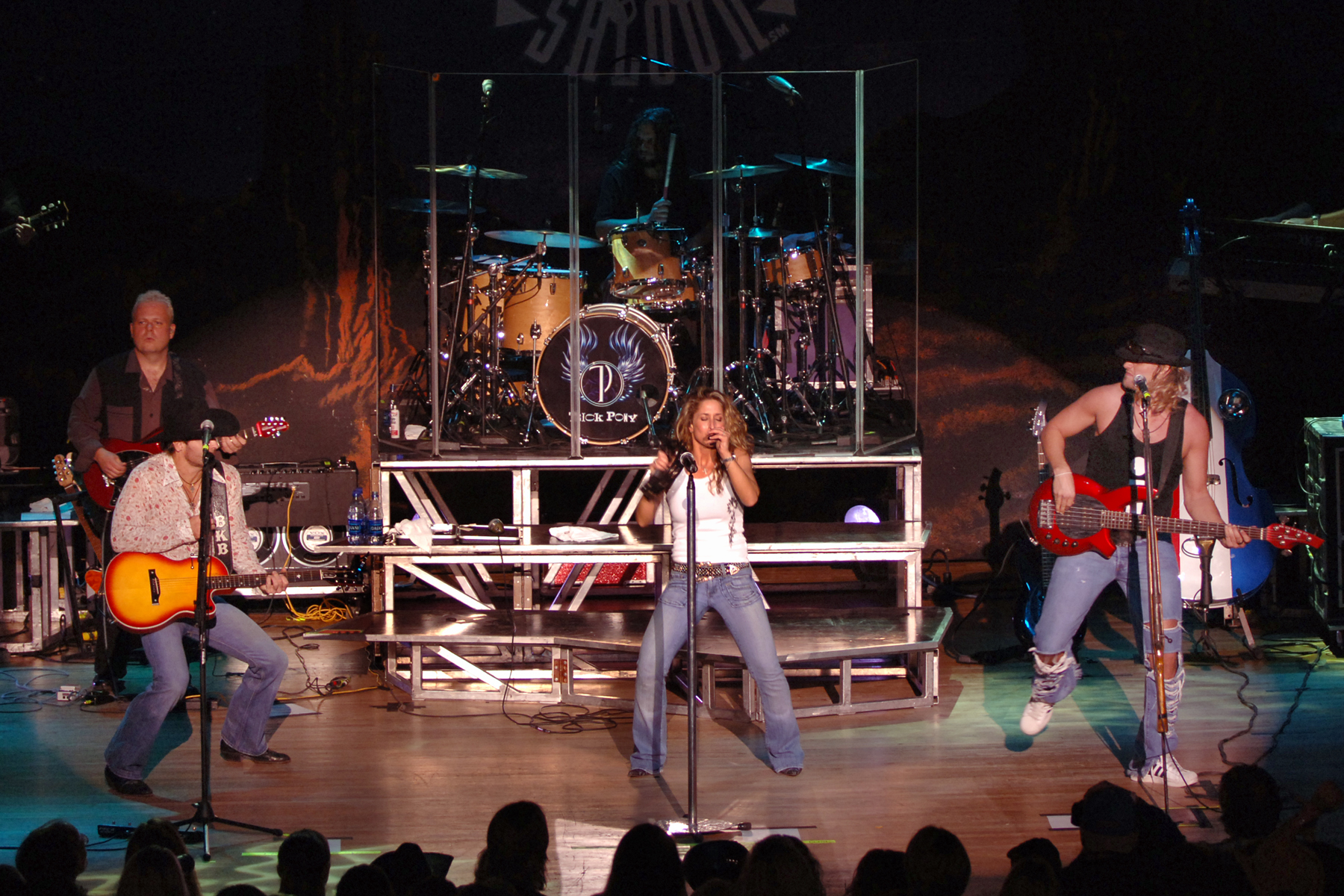
- Trick Pony in concert (L-R: Keith Burns, Heidi Newfield, Ira Dean)

Background information
- Origin: Nashville, Tennessee, U.S.
- Genre: Country
- Years active: 1996-2008, 2013-2016
- Labels: Warner Bros. Nashville; Curb; Permian
- Spinoffs: Burns & Poe
- Past members: Keith Burns; Ira Dean; Heidi Newfield; Aubrey Collins

Trick Pony was an American country music group from Nashville, Tennessee. It was formed in 1999 by Heidi Newfield (lead vocals, acoustic guitar, harmonica), Keith Burns (lead guitar, vocals), and Ira Dean (bass guitar, vocals). They recorded three studio albums: Trick Pony, On a Mission, and R.I.D.E., released in 2001, 2002, and 2005. These albums produced eight singles on the Billboard Hot Country Songs chart, including four Top 20 hits: "Pour Me", "On a Night like This", "Just What I Do", and "On a Mission".

In 2006, Newfield departed for a solo career and Aubrey Collins replaced her as lead vocalist. The group disbanded after Collins and Dean left in 2007 and 2008. Newfield released a solo debut album, What Am I Waiting For, in 2008 on Curb Records, while Burns joined singer Michelle Poe to form a duo called Burns & Poe. Burns, Dean, and Newfield reformed the group in late 2013, although Dean left again in 2014. The revived lineup released one more album, Pony Up, via Permian Records in 2016.

== History ==
Trick Pony was formed in 1996 by guitarist Keith Burns and bass guitarist Ira Dean. Both musicians had experience as backing musicians for other country music acts: Burns had previously worked with Joe Diffie, and Dean with Tanya Tucker. Keith and Ira decided to form a group composed of two men and a woman. Completing the lineup was lead singer Heidi Newfield, a friend of Burns's wife. The trio began touring throughout the Southern United States and performed regularly at 8 Seconds Saloon in Indianapolis, Indiana.

=== Musical career ===
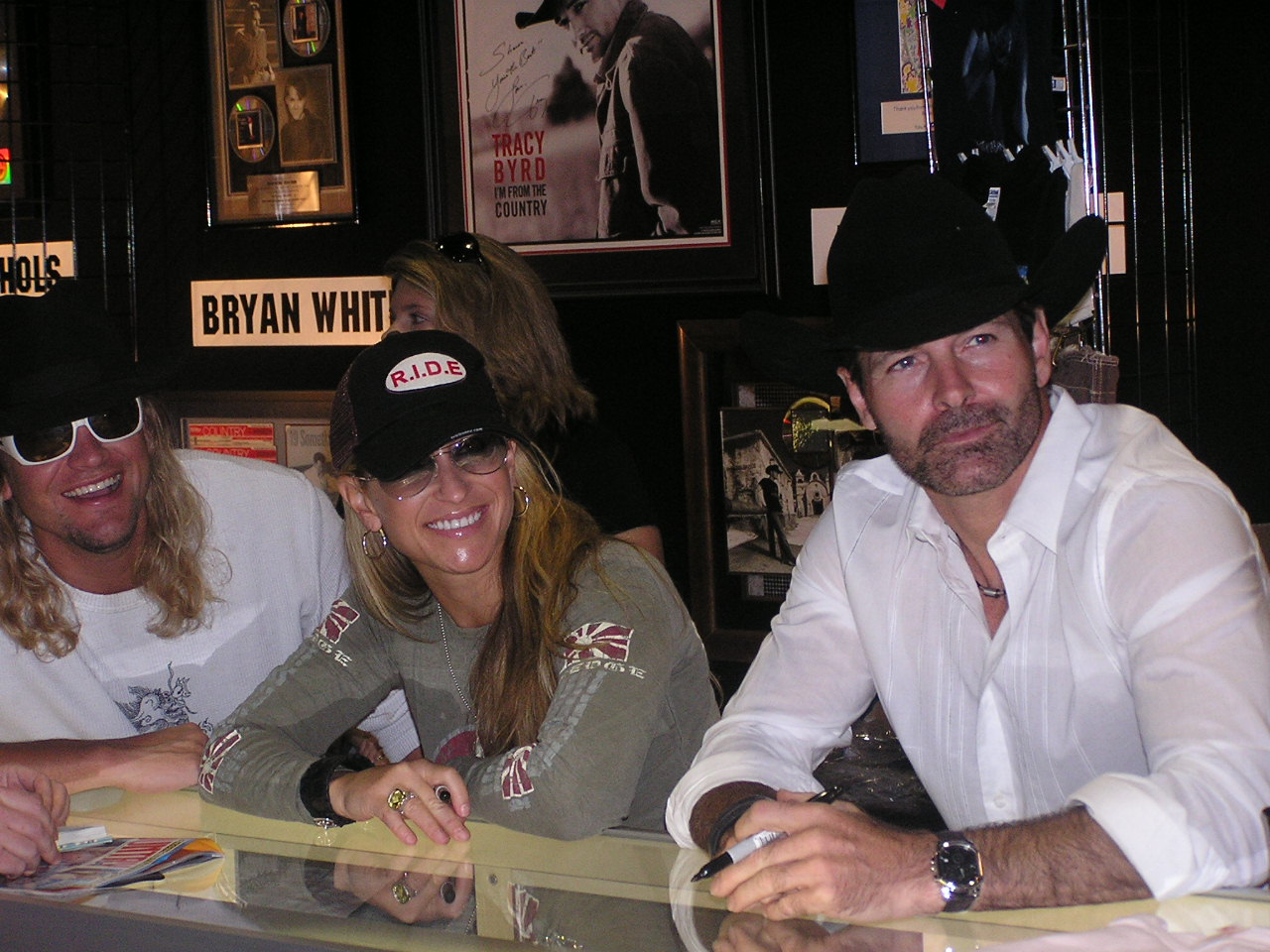
Ira Dean, Heidi Newfield and Keith Burns signing autographs at the CMA Music Festival in 2006

By 2000, Trick Pony was signed to a record deal with Warner Bros. Records. The trio released its self-titled debut album that year. Serving as its lead-off single was "Pour Me" which reached #12 on the Billboard country music chart. The album's next two singles were "On a Night like This" and "Just What I Do", which reached #4 and #13 on the country chart. In 2001, the trio also received the Artist of the Year award from the Country Music Association.

On a Mission was the title of Trick Pony's second album. Although its David Lee Murphy-penned title track reached Top 20 on the country chart, the second single (2003's "A Boy Like You") failed to enter Top 40, and the group was dropped from Warner Bros.' roster shortly afterward.

In 2004, Trick Pony was signed to its second record deal, this time with Asylum-Curb Records. The group's sixth single overall, entitled "The Bride", was issued that year, serving as the lead-off to their third studio album, R.I.D.E., whose title is an abbreviation for "Rebellious Individuals Delivering Entertainment". The second single from R.I.D.E. was a cover of Bonnie Tyler's "It's a Heartache". Trick Pony's version of the song peaked at #22 on the country chart. The third single from R.I.D.E., "Ain't Wastin' Good Whiskey on You", featured guest vocals from Tracy Byrd, Joe Diffie, Mel Tillis, Tanya Tucker, and Darryl Worley.

== Departure of Heidi Newfield and subsequent disbanding ==
In October 2006, lead singer Heidi Newfield announced that she would be leaving Trick Pony in pursuit of a solo career. She made her official departure at the end of the group's December 2006 tour. The same month, Gary Allan charted with "A Feelin' Like That", which Dean wrote with David Lee Murphy. Newfield began recording her first solo album for Asylum-Curb in June 2007. She made her solo debut on Cledus T. Judd's 2007 album Boogity, Boogity - A Tribute to the Comedic Genius of Ray Stevens, on which she, Judd, and Keith Urban performed a cover of Ray Stevens's 1969 single "Gitarzan".

Aubrey Collins, a singer-songwriter from Littleton, Colorado. who had previously been eliminated from ABC's television program The One: Making a Music Star, was chosen as Newfield's replacement in 2007. Collins made her official debut as lead singer in April of that year at the Country Thunder festival in Arizona. Collins left the group in October, saying that although she enjoyed working with the group's other two members, they "had different creative and musical visions." Dean announced his departure in February 2008 and Trick Pony subsequently disbanded. In April 2009, Warner Bros. released The Best of Trick Pony, a compilation composed of songs from the trio's first two albums.

== Status of former members; reunion ==
Newfield released her solo debut album, What Am I Waiting For, via Curb Records in 2008. Burns, meanwhile, founded the duo Burns & Poe with former DreamWorks Records Nashville artist Michelle Poe. Dean began writing songs for other artists, including Montgomery Gentry's 2009 single "One in Every Crowd". In July 2011, he signed to a recording contract with Average Joes Entertainment.

In 2013, Trick Pony's original lineup reunited for a performance at a benefit concert in Boston, Massachusetts. In February 2014, the group announced plans to tour and release new music. The trio had finished several tracks for a new album before Dean left only two months later. In March 2015, he released a solo single, "Nothin' to Do Round Here", which he wrote with Jeffrey Steele and Shane Minor. The song features guest vocals from Steele, Ronnie Milsap, Lee Roy Parnell, Montgomery Gentry, and Colt Ford.

== Discography ==
=== Studio albums ===
| Title | Album details | Peak chart positions | | Certifications (sales thresholds) |
| Title | Album details | US Country | US | Certifications (sales thresholds) |
|---|---|---|---|---|
| Trick Pony | Release date: March 13, 2001; Label: Warner Bros. Nashville | 12 | 91 | US: Gold |
| On a Mission | Release date: November 5, 2002; Label: Warner Bros. Nashville | 13 | 61 | |
| R.I.D.E. | Release date: August 23, 2005; Label: Asylum-Curb Records | 4 | 20 | |

=== Extended plays ===
| Title | Album details |
|---|---|
| Pony Up | Release date: February 26, 2016; Label: Permian Records |

=== Compilation albums ===
| Title | Album details | Peak positions |
| Title | Album details | US Country |
|---|---|---|
| The Best of Trick Pony | Release date: April 14, 2009; Label: Warner Bros. Nashville | 58 |

=== Singles ===
| Year | Single | Peak chart positions | | Album |
| Year | Single | US Country | US | Album |
|---|---|---|---|---|
| 2000 | "Pour Me" | 12 | 71 | Trick Pony |
| 2001 | "On a Night Like This" | 4 | 47 | Trick Pony |
| 2002 | "Just What I Do" | 13 | —^{[A]} | Trick Pony |
| 2002 | "On a Mission" | 19 | —^{[B]} | On a Mission |
| 2003 | "A Boy Like You" | 47 | — | On a Mission |
| 2004 | "The Bride" | 27 | — | R.I.D.E. |
| 2005 | "It's a Heartache" | 22 | — | R.I.D.E. |
| 2005 | "Ain't Wastin' Good Whiskey on You" | 42 | — | R.I.D.E. |
"—" denotes releases that did not chart

Notes

- A "Just What I Do" did not enter the Hot 100, but peaked at number 3 on the Bubbling Under Hot 100 Singles chart, which acts as a 25-song extension of the Hot 100.
- B "On a Mission" did not enter the Hot 100, but peaked at number 10 on the Bubbling Under Hot 100 Singles chart, which acts as a 25-song extension of the Hot 100.

=== Music videos ===
| Year | Video | Director |
|---|---|---|
| 2000 | "Pour Me" | Peter Zavadil |
| 2001 | "On a Night Like This" | Peter Zavadil |
| 2002 | "Just What I Do" | Peter Zavadil |
| 2002 | "On a Mission" | Gerry Wenner |
| 2004 | "The Bride" | Peter Zavadil |
| 2005 | "It's a Heartache" | Jeffrey Phillips |
