= Heidi Newfield =

American singer-songwriter

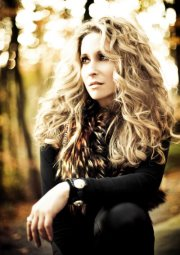
- Newfield in 2012

Background information
- Born: Heidi Kay Newfield; October 4, 1970 (age 55)
- Origin: Healdsburg, California, United States
- Genres: Country
- Occupation: Singer-songwriter
- Instrument(s): Vocals, Harmonica, Guitar
- Years active: 1996–present
- Labels: Curb
- Formerly of: Trick Pony
- Website: heidinewfieldmusic.com

Heidi Kay Newfield (born October 4, 1970) is an American country music artist. She was lead singer, rhythm guitarist and harmonica player for the group Trick Pony, alongside Keith Burns and Ira Dean from 1996 until 2006, when she left in pursuit of a solo career. Newfield has begun her solo career on Curb Records, debuting in 2008 with the single, "Johnny & June." This song, which peaked at No. 11 on the Hot Country Songs charts, is the first release from her solo debut album, What Am I Waiting For, which has produced a second Top 30 country hit, "Cry Cry ('Til the Sun Shines)."

== Biography ==
Newfield was born in Healdsburg, California. By age 13, she had decided to pursue a career in country music. In 1996, she joined Keith Burns and Ira Dean to form the group Trick Pony. Newfield recorded three albums as a member of Trick Pony: Trick Pony (2001), On a Mission (2003) and R.I.D.E. (2005). These albums accounted for eight singles on the Billboard country charts, including the group's highest peaking, the No. 4 "On a Night like This," from 2001. Newfield sang lead vocals on most of the group's songs, including every single except "Just What I Do." She also played rhythm guitar and harmonica and co-wrote several songs on each album. Newfield announced her departure from Trick Pony in 2006.

Newfield's first work outside of Trick Pony was as a guest vocalist on Cledus T. Judd's cover of the Ray Stevens song "Gitarzan", featured on Judd's 2007 album Boogity, Boogity - A Tribute to the Comedic Genius of Ray Stevens. Later that same year, Newfield began working with record producer Tony Brown to record her solo album for Curb Records, the same label to which Trick Pony was signed from 2004 to 2008. Her debut single, "Johnny & June," entered the country charts in early 2008, followed by the release of her debut album What Am I Waiting For in August of that year. "Johnny & June" peaked at number 11 on the country charts, in late September 2008, and was followed a month later by "Cry Cry ('Til the Sun Shines)". This song, originally recorded by Martina McBride on her album Waking Up Laughing, peaked at 29 in early 2009. The title track was released as the album's third single on May 4, 2009, and reached 57.

In November 2010, Newfield announced that she would be working with producer Blake Chancey on a second album. Its first single, "Stay Up Late," which was written by Ben Hayslip, Sonya Isaacs, and Jimmy Yeary, was released in March 2011 and peaked at number 51 on the Billboard Hot Country Songs chart.

In April 2012, Curb Records revived Sidewalk Records and signed Newfield as the flagship artist for the label. Newfield's first single for Sidewalk, "Why’d You Have to Be So Good", written by Jeffrey Steele and Jeremy Popoff, guitarist for the band Lit, was released in mid-2012.

To add before Trick Pony the band was called Rebel.

== Personal life ==
Newfield married National Football League agent Bill Johnson on June 6, 2004. On September 14, 2011, she announced that she had filed for divorce.

Newfield, pictured in a faded "NRA Country" ballcap for American Hunter magazine discussed her favorite types of hunting and her love of the outdoors. The NRA named Heidi Newfield as their NRA Country Artist of the Month, October 2012. In the article Newfield discussed life on the road and her genuine love of the outdoors. She was quoted as saying that her favorite hunting season is deer season because of the cold weather and football. Newfield talks about enjoying "wild hog roasts and big, warm fires" in addition to hunting blacktail deer near her home in Northern California. Further, Newfield shared with NRA Country that "Country is much more than the place you were born and raised. To me, it’s about having a love for our beautiful land and a respect for this great nation’s founding principles. I’ve been lucky enough to travel across the U.S. and I think it’s the best place on earth. I’m Heidi Newfield and I am NRA Country."

== Discography ==
=== Studio albums ===
Title	Album details	Peak chart positions	
Title	Album details	US Country	US
What Am I Waiting For	Release date: August 5, 2008; Label: Curb Records; Formats: CD, music download	2	10

=== Singles ===
Year	Single	Peak chart positions		Sales	Certifications	Album
Year	Single	US Country	US	Sales	Certifications	Album
2008	"Johnny & June"	11	58	US: 862,000	RIAA: Platinum	What Am I Waiting For
2008	"Cry Cry ('Til the Sun Shines)"	29	—			What Am I Waiting For
2009	"What Am I Waiting For"	57	—			What Am I Waiting For
2011	"Stay Up Late"	51	—			—
2012	"Why'd You Have to Be So Good"	—	—			—
"—" denotes releases that did not chart

=== Guest singles ===
Year	Single	Artist	Album
2007	"Gitarzan"	Cledus T. Judd	Boogity, Boogity

=== Music videos ===
Year	Video	Director
2008	"Johnny & June"	Eric Welch
2009	"Cry Cry ('Til the Sun Shines)"	Eric Welch
2012	"Why'd You Have to Be So Good"	Eric Welch

== Awards and nominations ==
Year	Organization	Category	Result
2004	Country Music Association Awards	Vocal Group of the Year	Nominated
2009	Academy of Country Music Awards	Top Female Vocalist	Nominated
2009	Academy of Country Music Awards	Single Record of the Year — "Johnny & June"	Nominated
2009	Academy of Country Music Awards	Song of the Year — "Johnny & June"	Nominated
2009	Academy of Country Music Awards	Video of the Year — "Johnny & June"	Nominated
