= Darryl Worley discography =

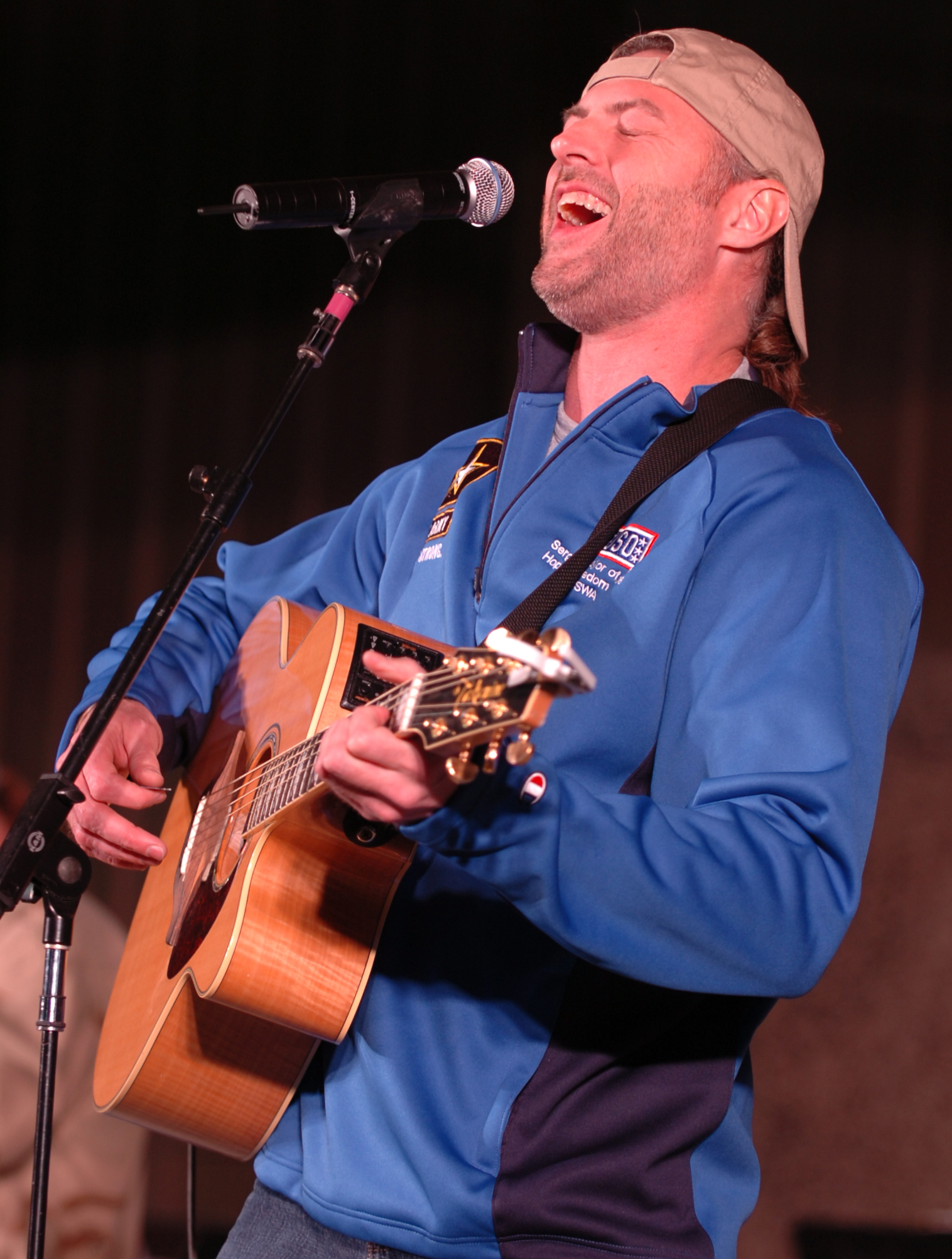
- Darryl Worley in 2006
- Studio albums: 5
- Compilation albums: 1
- Singles: 23
- Music videos: 14

American musician Darryl Worley has released five studio albums, one compilation album, and twenty-three singles. Worley was signed to DreamWorks Records' Nashville division in 2000, releasing his debut album Hard Rain Don't Last that same year. The album accounted for four singles on the Billboard Hot Country Songs charts. It was followed in 2002 by I Miss My Friend, the title track of which became Worley's first number-one single on Hot Country Songs. He also topped the country charts in 2003 with "Have You Forgotten?", his longest-lasting at seven weeks, and a third and final time with "Awful, Beautiful Life" in early 2005. The former was included on a compilation album of the same name, while the latter appeared on his third and final DreamWorks album, Darryl Worley.

Following the closure of DreamWorks Records in 2005, Worley released Here and Now on 903 Music, a former label owned by country singer Neal McCoy. Sounds Like Life followed in 2009 on the former Stroudavarious Records (later known as R&J Records). His last charted single was 2012's "You Still Got It", on the also defunct Tenacity label.

== Albums ==
=== Studio albums ===
Title	Album details	Peak chart positions				Certifications (sales threshold)
Title	Album details	US Country	US	US Indie	US Heat	Certifications (sales threshold)
Hard Rain Don't Last	Release date: July 18, 2000; Label: DreamWorks Nashville	33	—	—	39	
I Miss My Friend	Release date: July 16, 2002; Label: DreamWorks Nashville	1	22	—	—	US: Gold
Darryl Worley	Release date: November 2, 2004; Label: DreamWorks Nashville	12	72	—	—	
Here and Now	Release date: November 21, 2006; Label: 903 Music	35	187	11	—	
Sounds Like Life	Release date: June 9, 2009; Label: Stroudavarious Records	26	172	35	—	
"—" denotes releases that did not chart

=== Compilations ===
Title	Album details	Peak chart positions		Certifications (sales threshold)
Title	Album details	US Country	US	Certifications (sales threshold)
Have You Forgotten?	Release date: April 15, 2003; Label: DreamWorks Nashville	1	4	US: Gold

=== Singles ===
Year	Single	Peak chart positions			Album
Year	Single	US Country	US	CAN Country	Album
2000	"When You Need My Love"	15	75	30	Hard Rain Don't Last
2000	"A Good Day to Run"	12	76	*	Hard Rain Don't Last
2001	"Second Wind"	20	— (Note: "Second Wind" did not enter the Billboard Hot 100, but peaked at number 11 on Bubbling Under Hot 100 Singles.)	*	Hard Rain Don't Last
2001	"Sideways"	41	—	*	Hard Rain Don't Last
2002	"I Miss My Friend"	1	28	*	I Miss My Friend
2002	"Family Tree"	26	—	*	I Miss My Friend
2003	"Have You Forgotten?"	1	22	*	Have You Forgotten?
2003	"Tennessee River Run"	31	—	*	Have You Forgotten?
2003	"I Will Hold My Ground"	57	—	*	Have You Forgotten?
2004	"Awful, Beautiful Life"	1	30	8	Darryl Worley
2005	"If Something Should Happen"	9	75	26	Darryl Worley
2005	"I Love Her, She Hates Me"	56	—	—	Darryl Worley
2006	"Nothin' but a Love Thang"	35	—	—	Here and Now
2006	"I Just Came Back from a War"	18	— (Note: "I Just Came Back from a War" did not enter the Billboard Hot 100, but peaked at number 15 on Bubbling Under Hot 100 Singles.)	—	Here and Now
2007	"Livin' in the Here and Now"	54	—	—	Here and Now
2008	"Tequila on Ice"	44	—	—	Sounds Like Life
2009	"Sounds Like Life to Me"	11	84	37	Sounds Like Life
2010	"Best of Both Worlds"	43	—	—	Sounds Like Life
2010	"Keep the Change"	46	—	—	God & Family (unreleased)
2012	"You Still Got It"	40	—	—	One Time Around (unreleased)
2016	"Rainmaker"	—	—	—	Non-album singles
2017	"Lonely Alone"	—	—	—	Non-album singles
2023	"Have We Forgotten?"	—	—	—	TBD
2024	"Tractor Time" (featuring Chris Janson & Justin Moore)	—	—	—	TBD
"—" denotes releases that did not chart "*" denotes releases where no chart existed

=== Music videos ===
Year	Video	Director
2000	"When You Need My Love"	Mark Tucker/Jimmy Abegg
2000	"A Good Day to Run"	Trey Fanjoy
2001	"Second Wind"	Shaun Silva
2002	"I Miss My Friend"	Shaun Silva
2002	"Family Tree"	Shaun Silva
2003	"Have You Forgotten?"	Shaun Silva
2003	"Tennessee River Run"	Shaun Silva
2004	"Awful, Beautiful Life"	Cameron Casey
2005	"If Something Should Happen"	Shaun Silva
2006	"Nothin' but a Love Thang"	Sam Erickson
2006	"I Just Came Back from a War"	Jacob Hatley
2008	"Tequila on Ice"	Kristin Barlowe
2009	"Sounds Like Life to Me"	The Erwin Bros.
2012	"You Still Got It"	TK McKamy
2023	"Have We Forgotten?"	
