= Have You Forgotten? (album) =

Compilation album by Darryl Worley
- Released: April 15, 2003
- Genre: Country
- Length: 59:43
- Label: DreamWorks Nashville
- Producers: Frank Rogers; James Stroud

Darryl Worley chronology
I Miss My Friend (2002)	Have You Forgotten? (2003)	Darryl Worley (2004)

Professional ratings
Review scores
Source	Rating
Allmusic	link
The Village Voice	C−

Have You Forgotten? is the first compilation album by American country music singer Darryl Worley. It was released on April 15, 2003, via DreamWorks Records Nashville. The album contains select tracks from his first two albums, including four new songs, the title track, "I Will Hold My Ground", "I Need a Breather" and "Shiloh". The title track spent seven weeks at number one on the Hot Country Songs charts in 2003. Also released from this album were "Tennessee River Run" (previously found on his album I Miss My Friend) and "I Will Hold My Ground", the latter of which failed to make top 40. This album was certified gold by the RIAA. This CD is in HDCD format, providing improved audio quality on compatible players.

== Track listing ==
No.	Title	Writer(s)	Length
1.	"Have You Forgotten?"	Wynn Varble, Darryl Worley	4:03
2.	"I Will Hold My Ground"	Worley, Frank Rogers	4:03
3.	"POW 369"	Steven Dale Jones	3:43
4.	"I Need a Breather"	Steve Leslie, Worley	3:38
5.	"Back Where I Belong"	Randy Hardison, Leslie, Worley	3:20
6.	"Those Less Fortunate Than I"	Mark Nesler	3:57
7.	"Shiloh"	Don Poythress, Varble, Worley	4:24
8.	"Tennessee River Run"	Leslie, Worley	3:23
9.	"The Least That You Can Do"	Walt Aldridge, Worley	4:04
10.	"I Miss My Friend"	Tom Shapiro, Nesler, Tony Martin	4:02
11.	"Family Tree"	Darrell Scott	3:21
12.	"A Good Day to Run"	Bobby Tomberlin, Worley	3:08
13.	"Second Wind"	Leslie, Worley	4:24
14.	"When You Need My Love"	Varble, Worley	3:39
15.	"Too Many Pockets"	Leslie, Worley	2:49
16.	"The Way Things Are Goin'"	Mark D. Sanders, Worley	3:46
Total length:			59:47

- Tracks 1, 2, 4 and 7 are new songs
- Tracks 3, 5, 8, 9, 10 and 11 from I Miss My Friend
- Tracks 6, 12, 13, 14, 15 and 16 from Hard Rain Don't Last

== Personnel ==
As listed in liner notes.

- Eddie Bayers – drums
- Larry Beaird – acoustic guitar
- Mike Brignardello – bass guitar
- Jim "Moose" Brown – piano, Hammond B-3 organ, keyboards
- J. T. Corenflos – electric guitar
- Melodie Crittenden – background vocals
- Eric Darken – percussion
- Glen Duncan – fiddle, mandolin
- Paul Franklin – steel guitar
- Carl Gorodetzky – violin on "Shiloh"
- Kevin "Swine" Grantt – bass guitar
- Randy Hardison – drums, percussion
- Aubrey Haynie – fiddle, mandolin
- Wes Hightower – background vocals
- John Hobbs – piano
- Rob Ickes – dobro
- Kirk "Jellyroll" Johnson – harmonica
- Mike Johnson – steel guitar
- Bob Mason – cello on "Shiloh"
- Brent Mason – electric guitar, six-string bass guitar, baritone guitar, gut string guitar
- Steve Nathan – piano, Wurlitzer electric piano, keyboards
- Frank Rogers – electric guitar, keyboards
- Manny Rogers – laughing on "Family Tree"
- Matt Rollings – piano, Hammond B-3 organ
- Brent Rowan – electric guitar
- Pam Sixfin – viola on "Shiloh"
- James Stroud – drums
- Bryan Sutton – acoustic guitar, mandolin, banjo
- Biff Watson – acoustic guitar
- Bergen White – violin on "Shiloh"
- Kris Wilkinson – viola on "Shiloh"
- Brian David Willis – percussion
- Glenn Worf – bass guitar
- Darryl Worley – lead vocals
- Curtis Wright – background vocals

Strings on "I Miss My Friend" performed by the Nashville String Machine. All strings arranged by Bergen White.

== Charts ==
=== Weekly charts ===
Chart (2003)	Peak position
US Billboard 200	4
US Top Country Albums (Billboard)	1

=== Year-end charts ===
Chart (2003)	Position
US Billboard 200	113
US Top Country Albums (Billboard)	16
