= List of Hot Country Singles & Tracks number ones of 2002 =

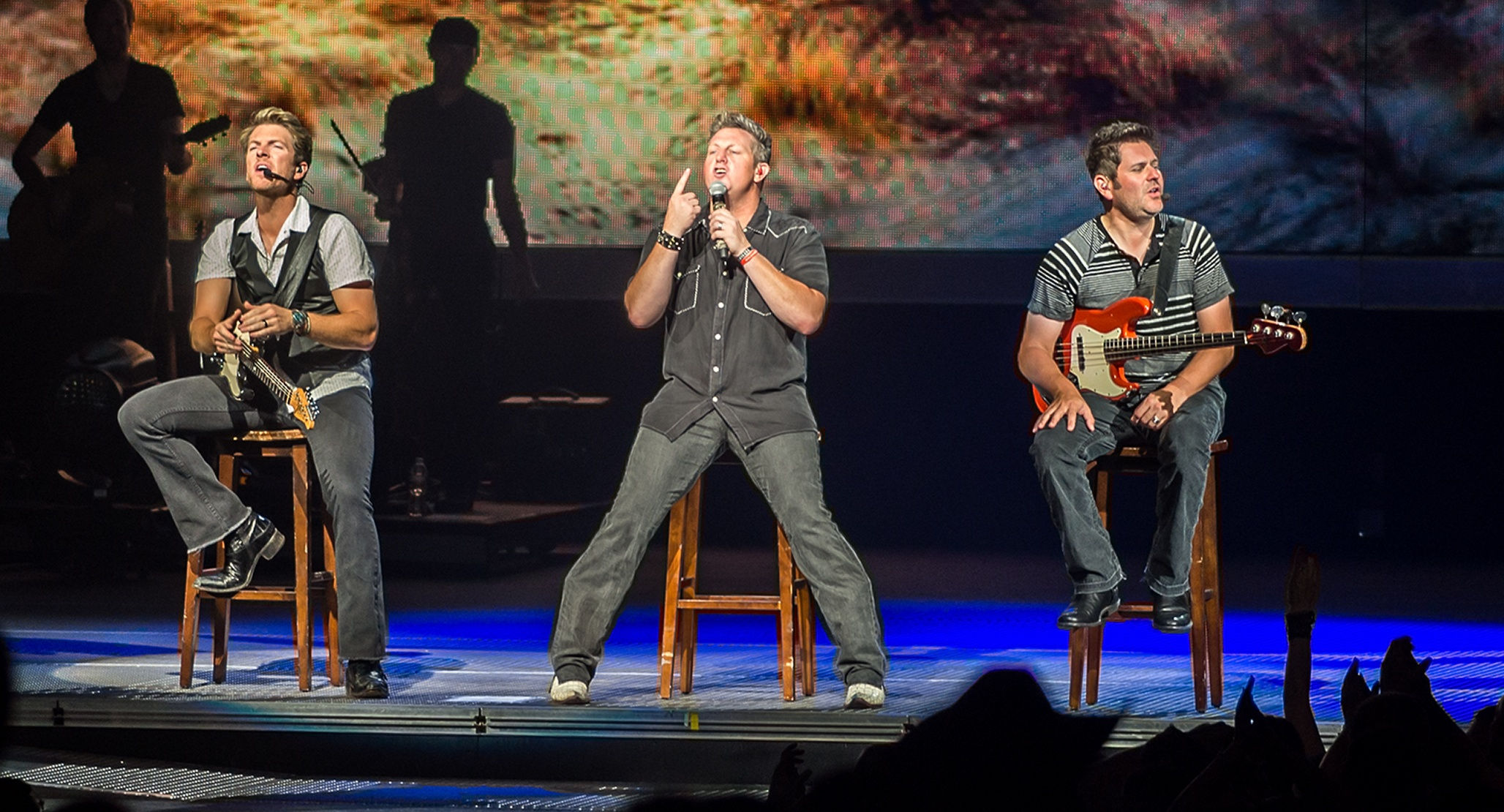
Rascal Flatts topped the chart for the first time in 2002.

Hot Country Songs is a chart that ranks the top-performing country music songs in the United States, published by Billboard magazine. In 2002, 21 different songs topped the chart, then published under the title Hot Country Singles & Tracks, in 52 issues of the magazine, based on weekly airplay data from country music radio stations compiled by Nielsen Broadcast Data Systems.

Singer Alan Jackson's song "Where Were You (When the World Stopped Turning)" was at number one at the start of the year, having been at the top since the issue dated December 29, 2001, and remained at number one until the issue dated February 2, when it was replaced by "Good Morning Beautiful" by Steve Holy. This marked Holy's first appearance at the top of the Hot Country Singles & Tracks chart. Other acts who reached the number one position for the first time in 2002 included Darryl Worley with "I Miss My Friend", Chris Cagle with "I Breathe In, I Breathe Out" and Rascal Flatts with "These Days". Additionally, while not his first number one, when Tracy Byrd topped the chart in October with "Ten Rounds with José Cuervo", it marked his first appearance at the top of the chart for more than nine years, as well as the first number one for songwriter Casey Beathard.

The longest unbroken run at number one during 2002 was seven weeks, achieved by Kenny Chesney's song "The Good Stuff", which was also ranked number one on Billboard's year-end chart of the most popular country songs. Two artists achieved three number one hits during 2002. Tim McGraw topped the chart in March with "Bring On the Rain", a collaboration with Jo Dee Messina, which was replaced at the top the following week by his single "The Cowboy in Me". Later in the year he returned to the number one position with "Unbroken". Toby Keith reached number one with "My List", "Courtesy of the Red, White and Blue (The Angry American)" and "Who's Your Daddy?". McGraw and Keith's singles contributed to a dominance of the chart in 2002 by male vocalists. Other than Messina's collaboration with McGraw, the only number one by a female artist was "Blessed" by Martina McBride, which would be the last number one for a solo female artist for more than two years. The final number one hit of the year was "She'll Leave You with a Smile" by George Strait.

== Chart history ==
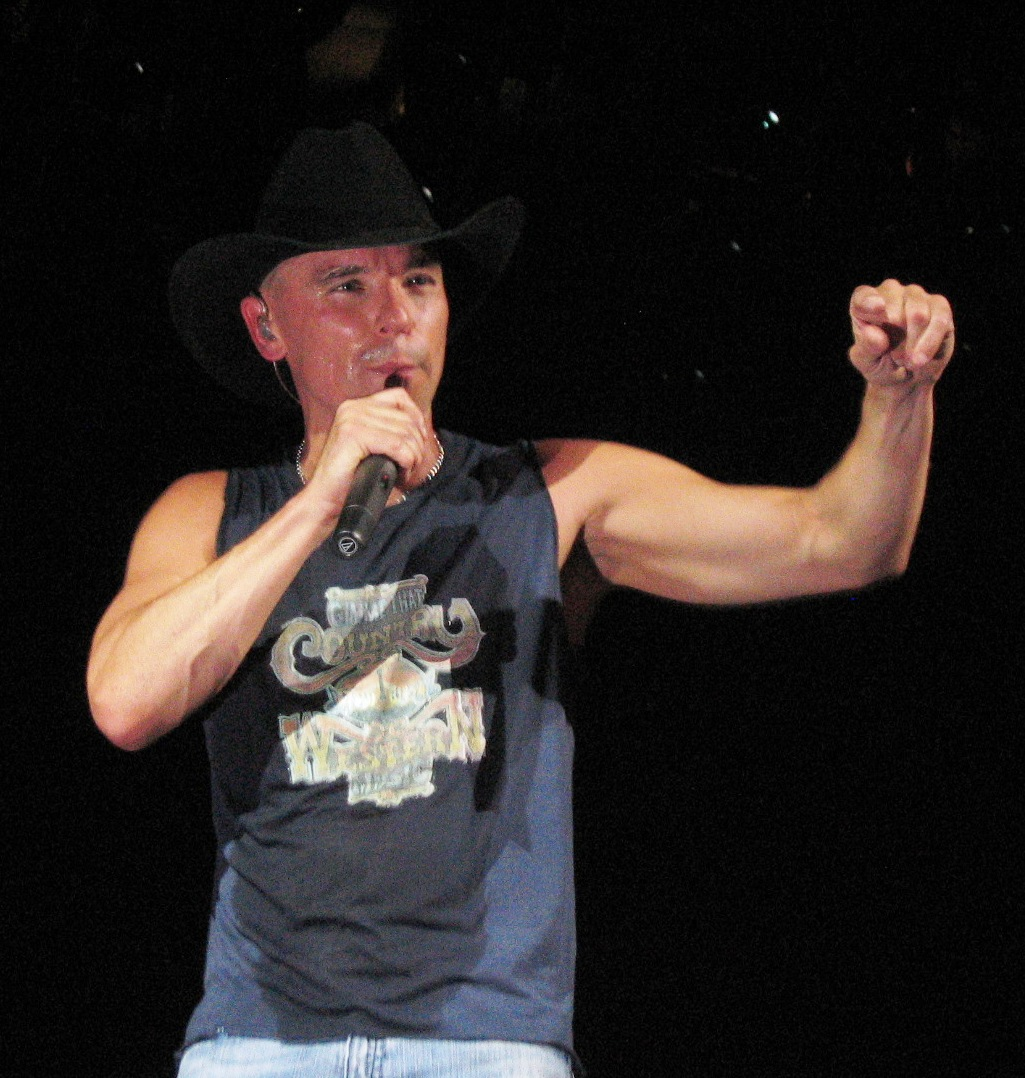
Kenny Chesney spent seven weeks at number one with "The Good Stuff".

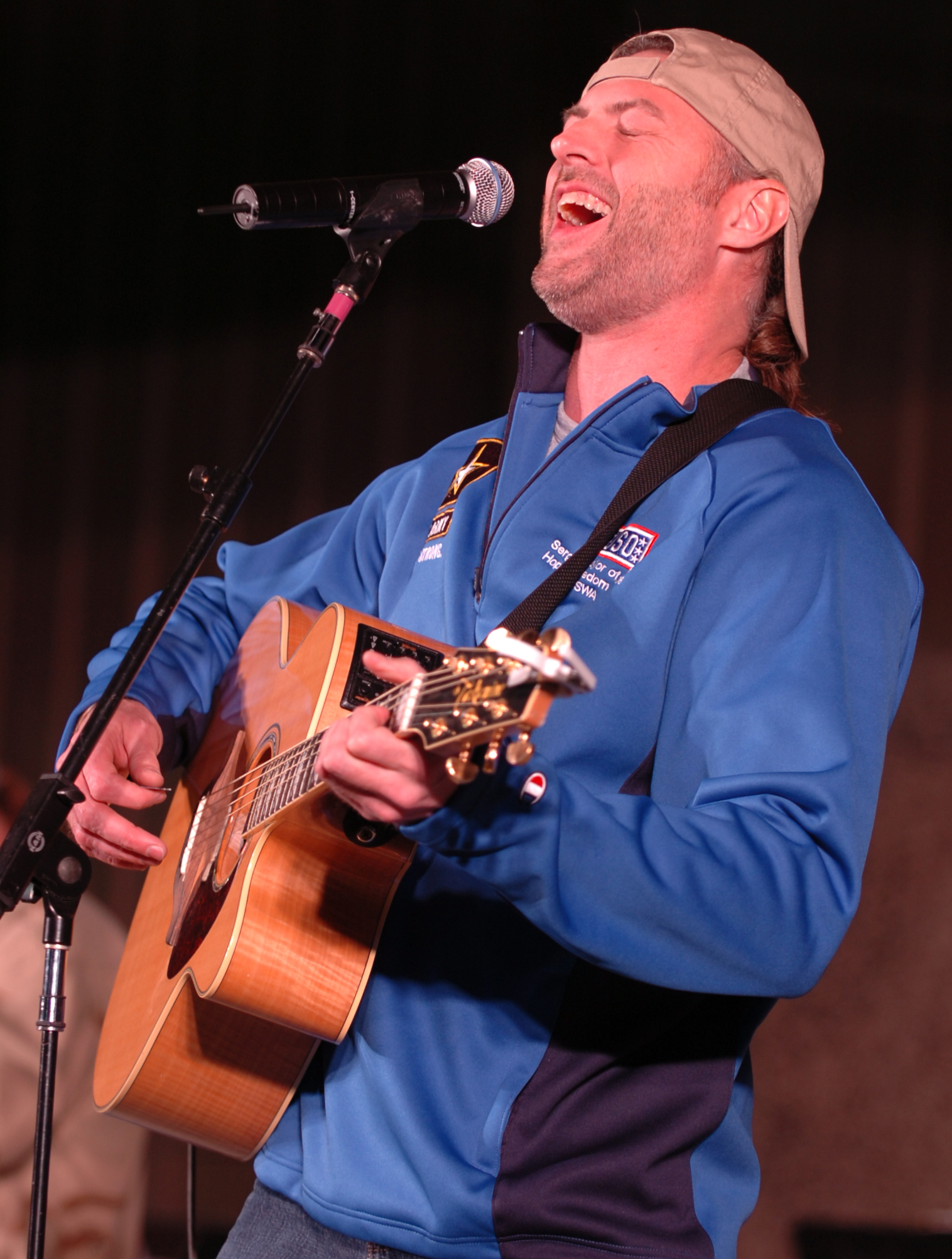
Darryl Worley achieved his first number one in 2002 with "I Miss My Friend".

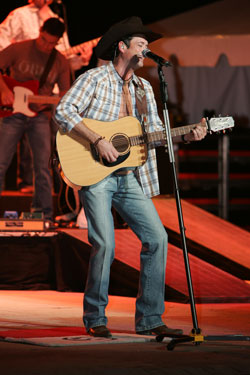
Tracy Byrd topped the charts for the first time since 1993.

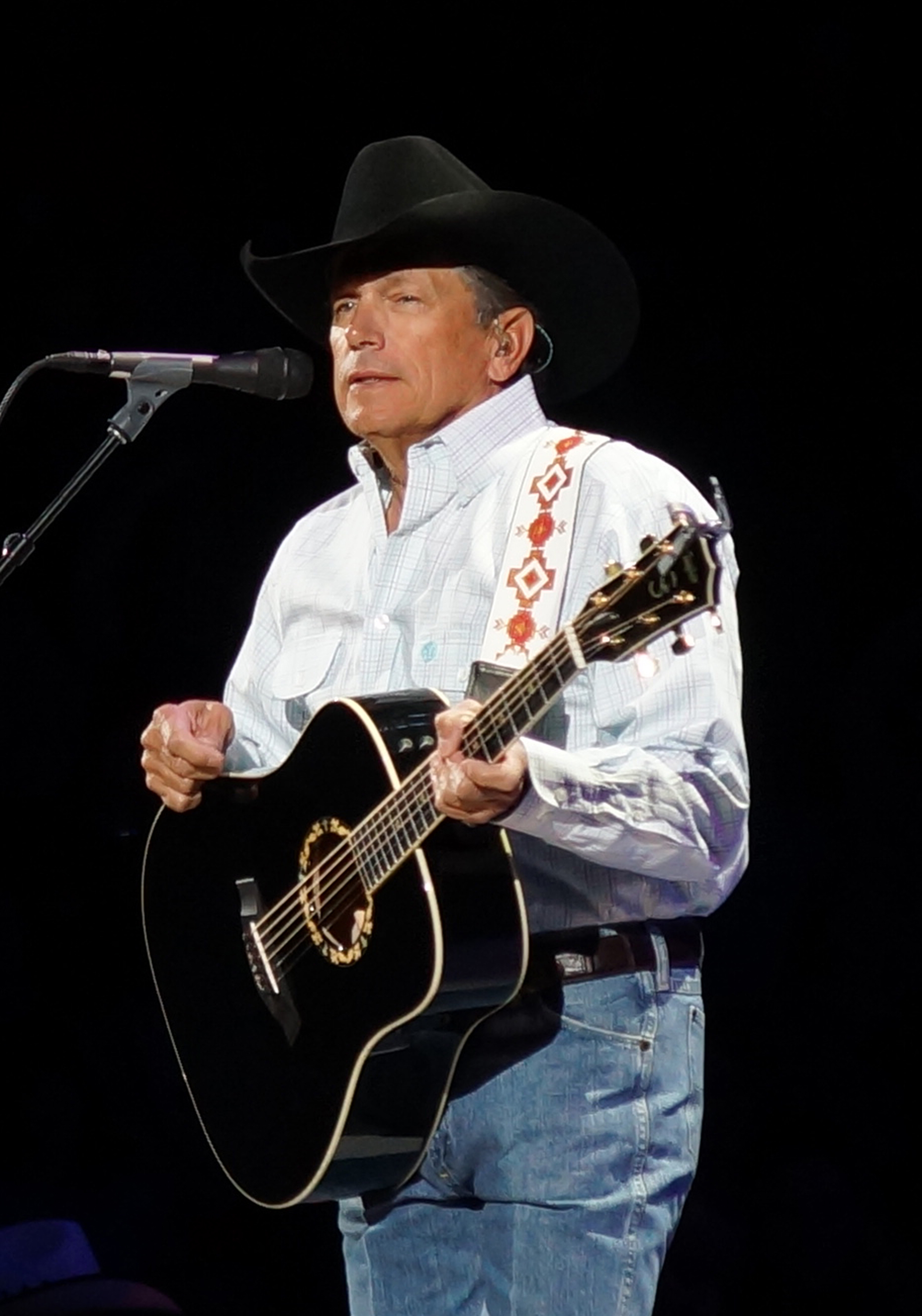
Veteran performer George Strait ended the year at number one.

Issue date	Title	Artist(s)	Ref.
January 5	"Where Were You (When the World Stopped Turning)"	Alan Jackson	
January 12	"Where Were You (When the World Stopped Turning)"	Alan Jackson	
January 19	"Where Were You (When the World Stopped Turning)"	Alan Jackson	
January 26	"Where Were You (When the World Stopped Turning)"	Alan Jackson	
February 2	"Good Morning Beautiful"	Steve Holy	
February 9	"Good Morning Beautiful"	Steve Holy	
February 16	"Good Morning Beautiful"	Steve Holy	
February 23	"Good Morning Beautiful"	Steve Holy	
March 2	"Good Morning Beautiful"	Steve Holy	
March 9	"Bring On the Rain"	Jo Dee Messina with Tim McGraw	
March 16	"The Cowboy in Me"	Tim McGraw	
March 23	"The Long Goodbye"	Brooks & Dunn	
March 30	"Blessed"	Martina McBride	
April 6	"Blessed"	Martina McBride	
April 13	"I Breathe In, I Breathe Out"	Chris Cagle	
April 20	"My List"	Toby Keith	
April 27	"My List"	Toby Keith	
May 4	"My List"	Toby Keith	
May 11	"My List"	Toby Keith	
May 18	"My List"	Toby Keith	
May 25	"Drive (For Daddy Gene)"	Alan Jackson	
June 1	"Drive (For Daddy Gene)"	Alan Jackson	
June 8	"Drive (For Daddy Gene)"	Alan Jackson	
June 15	"Drive (For Daddy Gene)"	Alan Jackson	
June 22	"Living and Living Well"	George Strait	
June 29	"Living and Living Well"	George Strait	
July 6	"I'm Gonna Miss Her (The Fishin' Song)"	Brad Paisley	
July 13	"I'm Gonna Miss Her (The Fishin' Song)"	Brad Paisley	
July 20	"Courtesy of the Red, White and Blue (The Angry American)"	Toby Keith	
July 27	"The Good Stuff"	Kenny Chesney	
August 3	"The Good Stuff"	Kenny Chesney	
August 10	"The Good Stuff"	Kenny Chesney	
August 17	"The Good Stuff"	Kenny Chesney	
August 24	"The Good Stuff"	Kenny Chesney	
August 31	"The Good Stuff"	Kenny Chesney	
September 7	"The Good Stuff"	Kenny Chesney	
September 14	"Unbroken"	Tim McGraw	
September 21	"I Miss My Friend"	Darryl Worley	
September 28	"Beautiful Mess"	Diamond Rio	
October 5	"Ten Rounds with José Cuervo"	Tracy Byrd	
October 12	"Beautiful Mess"	Diamond Rio	
October 19	"Somebody Like You"	Keith Urban	
October 26	"Somebody Like You"	Keith Urban	
November 2	"Somebody Like You"	Keith Urban	
November 9	"Somebody Like You"	Keith Urban	
November 16	"Somebody Like You"	Keith Urban	
November 23	"Somebody Like You"	Keith Urban	
November 30	"These Days"	Rascal Flatts	
December 7	"These Days"	Rascal Flatts	
December 14	"These Days"	Rascal Flatts	
December 21	"Who's Your Daddy?"	Toby Keith	
December 28	"She'll Leave You with a Smile"	George Strait	

== See also ==
- 2002 in music
- List of artists who reached number one on the U.S. country chart
