= List of Top Country Albums number ones of 2002 =

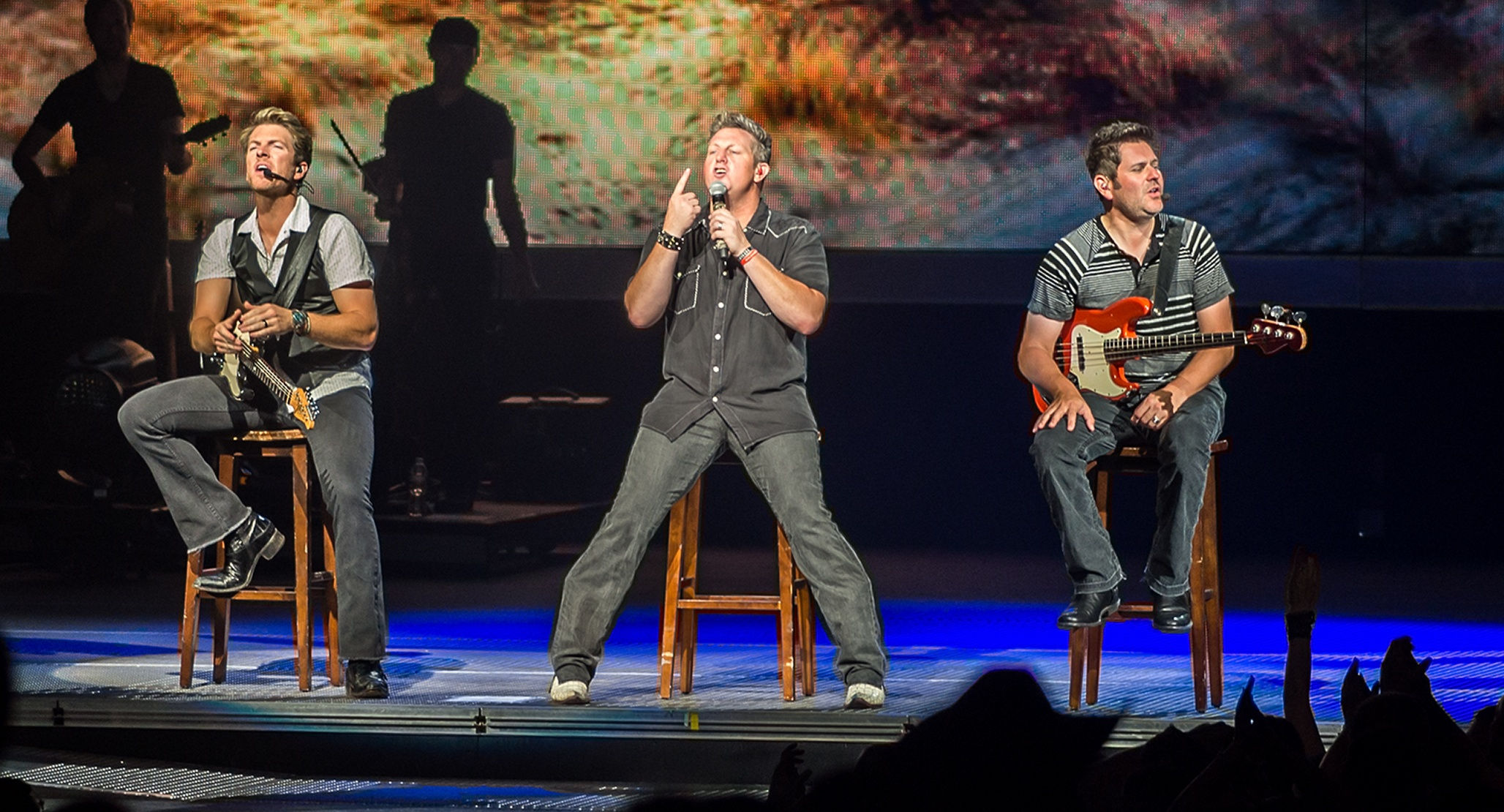
Rascal Flatts topped the chart for the first time with Melt.

Top Country Albums is a chart that ranks the top-performing country music albums in the United States, published by Billboard. In 2002, 11 different albums topped the chart, based on electronic point of sale data provided by SoundScan Inc.

In the issue of Billboard dated January 5, Scarecrow by Garth Brooks was at number one, its sixth week atop the chart. Two weeks later it was displaced by the soundtrack album of the film O Brother, Where Art Thou?, which was one of two albums to spend 11 weeks at number one during the year, the most by a single record. The second album to occupy the peak position for 11 weeks was No Shoes, No Shirt, No Problems by Kenny Chesney, which did so in two spells between May and July. Both albums also topped the all-genre Billboard 200 chart, as did most of the year's other country number ones, reflecting country music's high level of popularity and sales at the time; the genre's sales increased in 2002 even while overall music sales declined. The O Brother, Where Art Thou? soundtrack, which had spent 24 weeks at number one on the country chart in 2001, returned to the top of that listing and finally topped the Billboard 200 after more than 60 weeks on the chart following it winning the Grammy Award for Album of the Year in March 2002.

The only albums to reach number one on the Top Country Albums listing but not top the Billboard 200 were both by acts making their first appearance at number one on the country chart. In August, Darryl Worley spent a single week at number one with his first chart-topper, I Miss My Friend. Three months later, the group Rascal Flatts reached the top spot for the first time with Melt, which also spent one week at number one. The year's final number one was Up! by Shania Twain, which entered the chart at number one in the issue of Billboard dated December 7, and remained atop the chart for the remainder of the year. Twain had achieved huge success over the preceding five years, particularly with the album Come On Over, which is recognized as the highest-selling album of all time by a female artist, as well as the biggest-selling country album. Up!, however, would prove to be her final album of new material before she went on a lengthy hiatus from the music industry due to medical and personal issues.

== Chart history ==
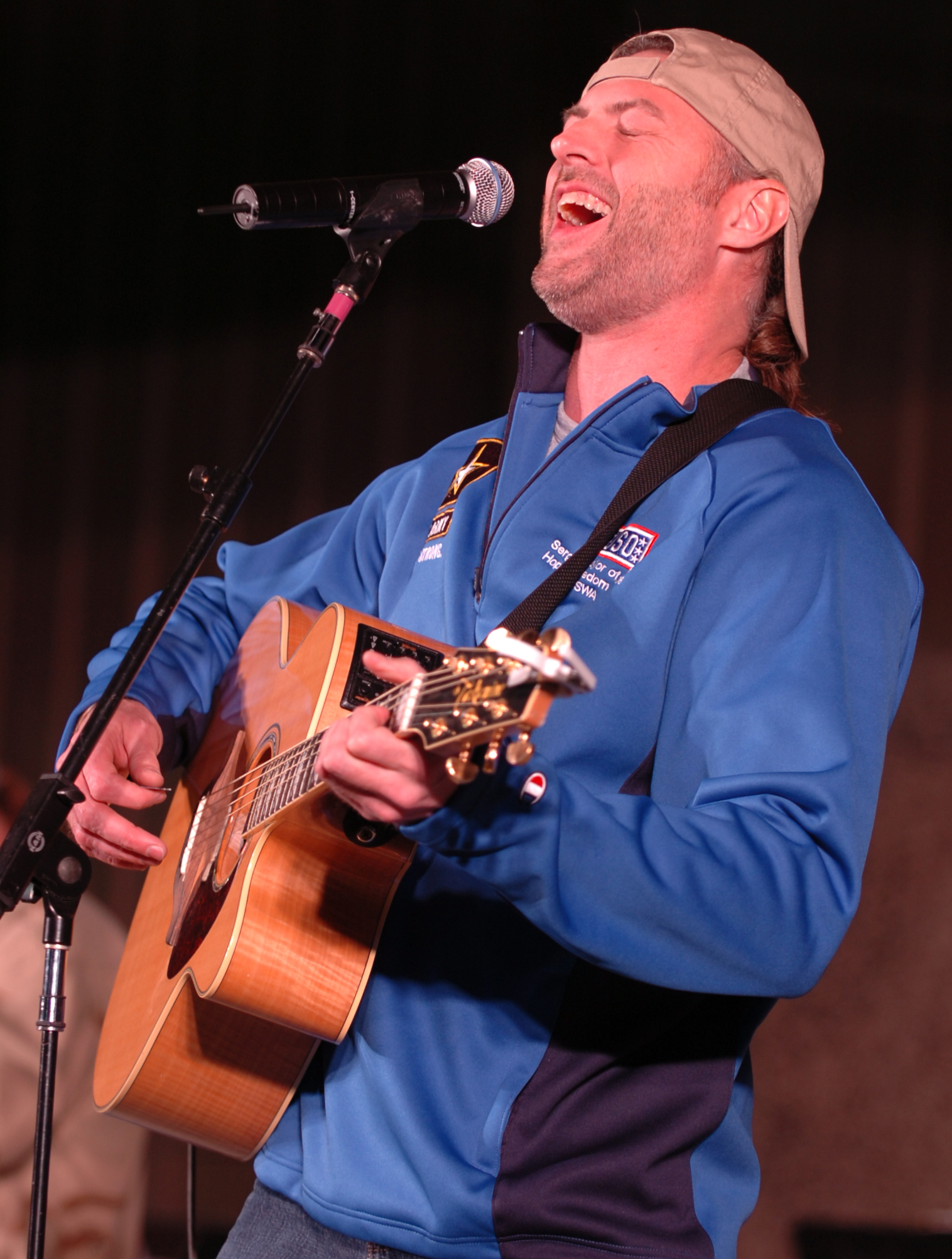
Darryl Worley achieved his first number one with I Miss My Friend.

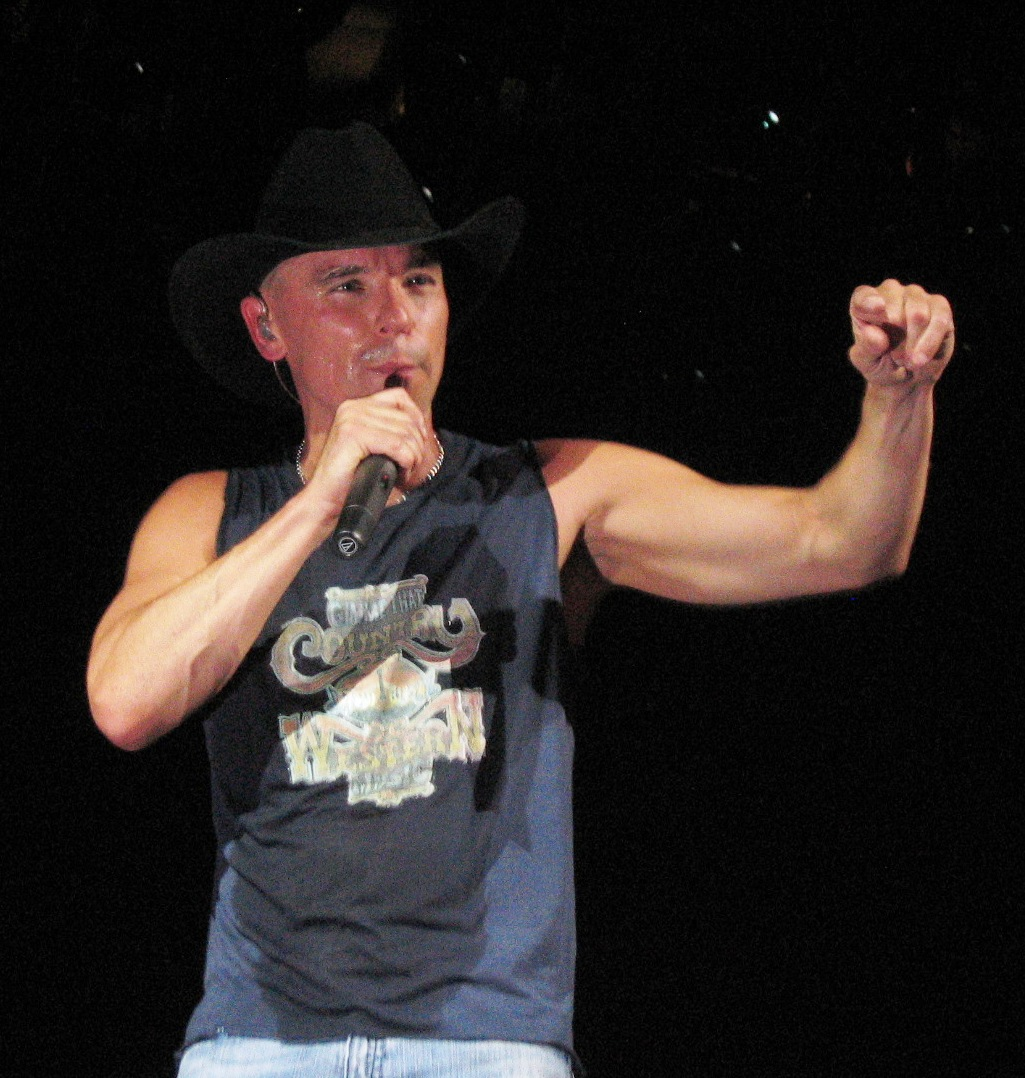
Kenny Chesney spent 11 weeks at number one with No Shoes, No Shirt, No Problems.

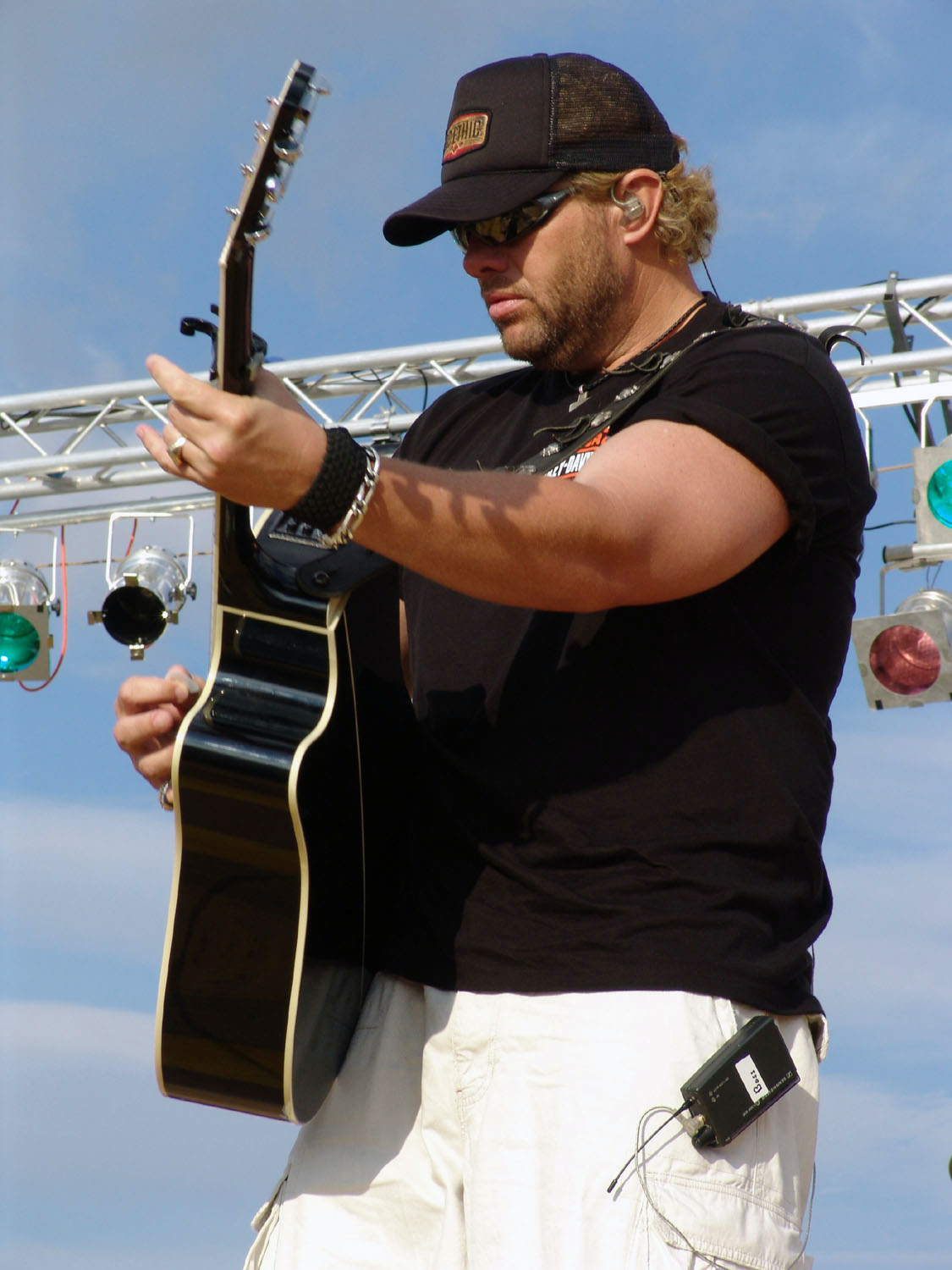
Unleashed was a number one for Toby Keith.

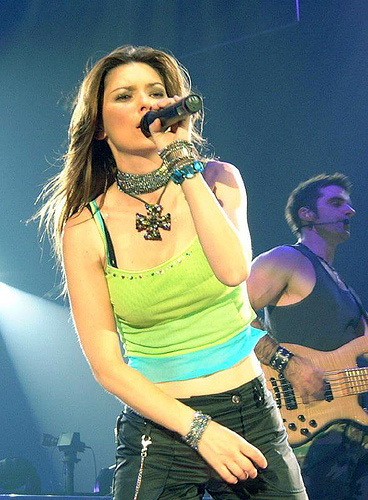
Shania Twain ended the year at number one with Up!. It would be her last album before a lengthy hiatus from the music industry.

Issue date	Title	Artist(s)	Ref.
January 5	Scarecrow	Garth Brooks	
January 12	Scarecrow	Garth Brooks	
January 19	O Brother, Where Art Thou?	Soundtrack	
January 26	O Brother, Where Art Thou?	Soundtrack	
February 2	Drive	Alan Jackson	
February 9	Drive	Alan Jackson	
February 16	Drive	Alan Jackson	
February 23	Drive	Alan Jackson	
March 2	Drive	Alan Jackson	
March 9	Drive	Alan Jackson	
March 16	O Brother, Where Art Thou?	Soundtrack	
March 23	O Brother, Where Art Thou?	Soundtrack	
March 30	O Brother, Where Art Thou?	Soundtrack	
April 6	O Brother, Where Art Thou?	Soundtrack	
April 13	O Brother, Where Art Thou?	Soundtrack	
April 20	O Brother, Where Art Thou?	Soundtrack	
April 27	O Brother, Where Art Thou?	Soundtrack	
May 4	O Brother, Where Art Thou?	Soundtrack	
May 11	No Shoes, No Shirt, No Problems	Kenny Chesney	
May 18	No Shoes, No Shirt, No Problems	Kenny Chesney	
May 25	No Shoes, No Shirt, No Problems	Kenny Chesney	
June 1	No Shoes, No Shirt, No Problems	Kenny Chesney	
June 8	No Shoes, No Shirt, No Problems	Kenny Chesney	
June 15	No Shoes, No Shirt, No Problems	Kenny Chesney	
June 22	No Shoes, No Shirt, No Problems	Kenny Chesney	
June 29	O Brother, Where Art Thou?	Soundtrack	
July 6	No Shoes, No Shirt, No Problems	Kenny Chesney	
July 13	No Shoes, No Shirt, No Problems	Kenny Chesney	
July 20	No Shoes, No Shirt, No Problems	Kenny Chesney	
July 27	No Shoes, No Shirt, No Problems	Kenny Chesney	
August 3	I Miss My Friend	Darryl Worley	
August 10	Unleashed	Toby Keith	
August 17	Unleashed	Toby Keith	
August 24	Unleashed	Toby Keith	
August 31	Unleashed	Toby Keith	
September 7	Unleashed	Toby Keith	
September 14	Home	Dixie Chicks	
September 21	Home	Dixie Chicks	
September 28	Home	Dixie Chicks	
October 5	Home	Dixie Chicks	
October 12	ELV1S: 30 #1 Hits	Elvis Presley	
October 19	ELV1S: 30 #1 Hits	Elvis Presley	
October 26	ELV1S: 30 #1 Hits	Elvis Presley	
November 2	Cry	Faith Hill	
November 9	Cry	Faith Hill	
November 16	Melt	Rascal Flatts	
November 23	Cry	Faith Hill	
November 30	Home	Dixie Chicks	
December 7	Up!	Shania Twain	
December 14	Up!	Shania Twain	
December 21	Up!	Shania Twain	
December 28	Up!	Shania Twain	
