= 2003 Country Music Association Awards =

Annual US music awards ceremony

- Date: November 5, 2003
- Location: Grand Ole Opry House, Nashville, Tennessee
- Hosted by: Vince Gill

Highlights
- Most wins: Johnny Cash† (3); Alan Jackson (3)
- Most nominations: Toby Keith (7)

Television/radio coverage
- Network: CBS

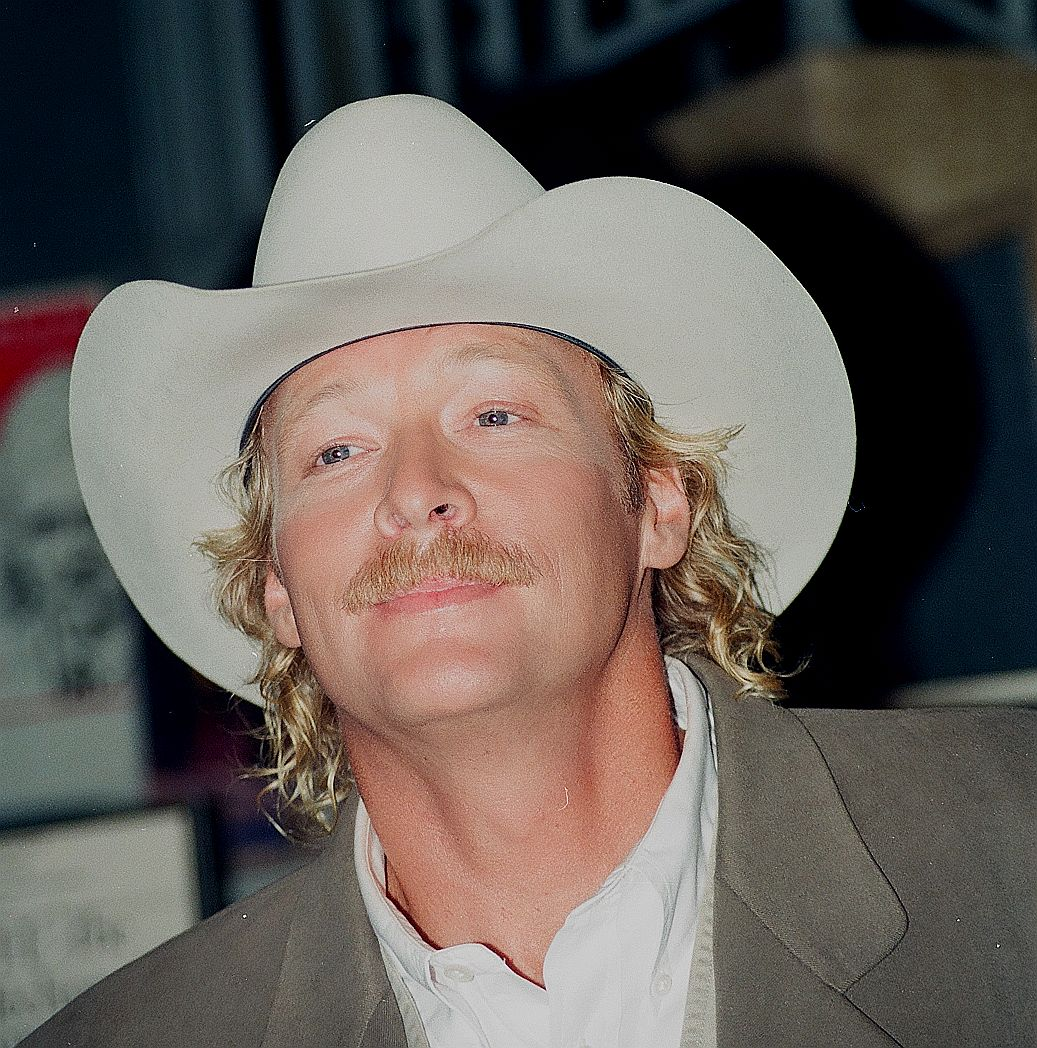
Alan Jackson, Entertainer of the Year recipient.

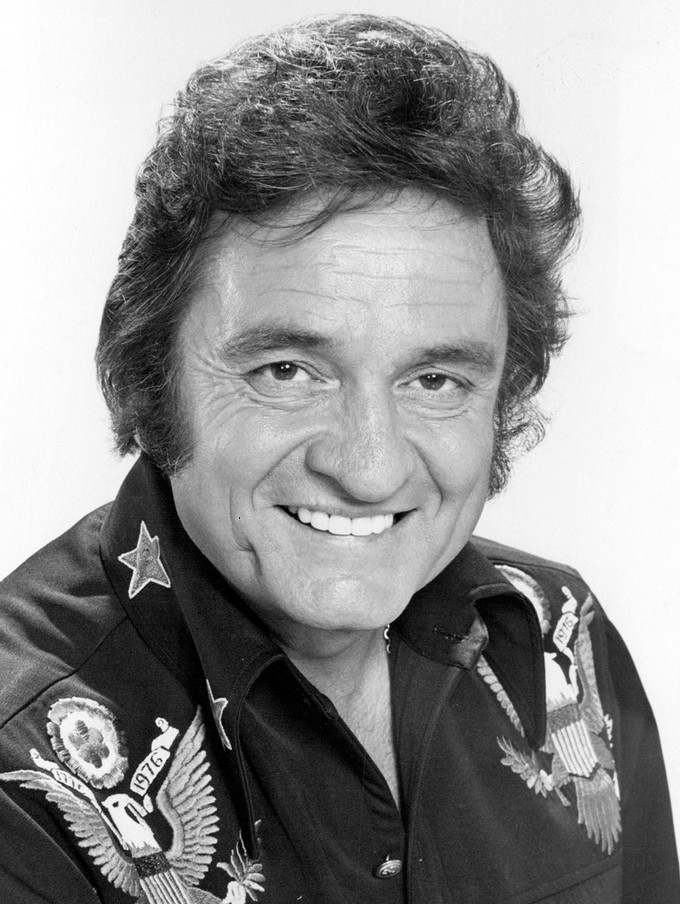
Country Music legend, Johnny Cash, won three awards posthumously. Tying Alan Jackson for the most wins for the ceremony.

The 2003 Country Music Association Awards, 37th Ceremony, was held on November 5, 2003 at the Grand Ole Opry House, Nashville, Tennessee, and hosted by CMA Award Winner, Vince Gill.

== Background ==
On September 12, Johnny Cash died from complications of diabetes. His children John Carter Cash and Kathy Cash accepted his awards on his behalf during the ceremony, with "standing ovations" for each win.

== Winners and Nominees ==
Entertainer of the Year	Album of the Year
Alan Jackson; Brooks & Dunn; Kenny Chesney; Toby Keith; Tim McGraw	American IV: The Man Comes Around — Johnny Cash†; Home — Dixie Chicks; Man With a Memory — Joe Nichols; Tim McGraw and the Dancehall Doctors — Tim McGraw; Unleashed — Toby Keith
Male Vocalist of the Year	Female Vocalist of the Year
Alan Jackson; Kenny Chesney; Toby Keith; Tim McGraw; Brad Paisley; George Strait	Martina McBride; Terri Clark; Alison Krauss; Patty Loveless; Dolly Parton
Vocal Group of the Year	Vocal Duo of the Year
Rascal Flatts; Alabama; Diamond Rio; Dixie Chicks; Lonestar	Brooks & Dunn; Bellamy Brothers; Montgomery Gentry; Sons of the Desert; The Warren Brothers
Single of the Year	Song of the Year
"Hurt" — Johnny Cash†; "Beer For My Horses" — Toby Keith and Willie Nelson; "Celebrity" — Brad Paisley; "Have You Forgotten?" — Darryl Worley; "Three Wooden Crosses" — Randy Travis	"Three Wooden Crosses" — Doug Johnson and Kim Williams; "Beer For My Horses" — Toby Keith and Scotty Emerick; "Celebrity" — Brad Paisley; "Have You Forgotten?" — Darryl Worley and Wynn Varble; "Red Dirt Road" — Kix Brooks and Ronnie Dunn
Horizon Award	Musician of the Year
Joe Nichols; Gary Allan; Buddy Jewell; Blake Shelton; Darryl Worley	Randy Scruggs, Guitar; Jerry Douglas, Dobro; Paul Franklin, Steel Guitar; Aubrie Haynie, Fiddle/Mandolin; Brent Mason, Guitar
Music Video of the Year	Music Event of the Year
"Hurt" — Johnny Cash†; "Beer For My Horses" — Toby Keith and Willie Nelson; "Celebrity" — Brad Paisley; "Concrete Angel" — Martina McBride; "Red Dirt Road" — Brooks & Dunn	"It's Five O'Clock Somewhere"— Alan Jackson and Jimmy Buffett; "Beer For My Horses" — Toby Keith and Willie Nelson; "Picture" — Kid Rock (feat. Sheryl Crow); "Tears in the Holston River" — Nitty Gritty Dirt Band and Johnny Cash; "The Truth About Men" — Tracy Byrd, Andy Griggs, Montgomery Gentry and Blake Shelton

== Performances ==
- Martina McBride — "In My Daughters Eyes"
- Kris Kristofferson and Willie Nelson — Tribute to Johnny Cash: "Folsom Prison Blues" and "I Walk The Line"
- Travis Tritt and Sheryl Crow — Tribute to Johnny Cash: "Jackson"
- Hank Williams Jr — Tribute to Johnny Cash: "Ring of Fire"
- Brooks & Dunn — "You Can't Take The Honky Tonk Out of the Girl"
- Rascal Flatts — "I Melt"
- Joe Nichols — "Brokenheartsville"
- Dolly Parton and Norah Jones — "The Grass Is Blue"
- Tim McGraw — "Red Ragtop"
- Kenny Chesney — "There Goes My Life"
- Toby Keith — "I Love This Bar"
- Terri Clark — "I Wanna Do It All"
- Patty Loveless — "Lovin' All Night"
- Buddy Jewell — "Help Pour out the Rain"
- Blake Shelton — "The Baby"
- Gary Allan — "Songs About Rain"
- Darryl Worley — "I Will Stand My Ground"
- George Strait — "Honk If You Honky Tonk"
- Shania Twain — "She's Not Just a Pretty Face"
- Alison Krauss — "Everytime You Say Goodbye"
- Brad Paisley — "Celebrity"
- Dierk Bentley — "What Was I Thinkin'"
- Vince Gill — "Young Man's Town"
