= Sounds Like Life =

Studio album by Darryl Worley
- Released: June 9, 2009
- Recorded: Big Studio, Nashville, TN; The Mooselodge, Goodlettsville, TN.
- Genre: Country
- Label: Stroudavarious
- Producer: Jim "Moose" Brown

Darryl Worley chronology
Here and Now (2006)	Sounds Like Life (2009)

Sounds Like Life is American country music singer Darryl Worley's fifth studio album. It was released on June 9, 2009 by the Stroudavarious label. The first single "Tequila on Ice" peaked at #44 in 2008, and the second single "Sounds Like Life to Me" became his first Top 40 country hit since "I Just Came Back from a War" in 2007. Worley co-wrote eight of the songs on this album. Sounds Like Life is produced by Jim "Moose" Brown.

== Content ==
=== "Tequila on Ice" ===
"Tequila on Ice" was released as the first single from the album. It peaked at #44 on the country charts in mid-2008.

=== "Sounds Like Life to Me" ===
Co-written by Worley with Wynn Varble (who has also written several of Worley's other singles) and Phil O'Donnell, "Sounds Like Life to Me" is the album's second single release. It has become Worley's first Top 20 country hit since "I Just Came Back from a War" in late 2006-early 2007.

=== "Best of Both Worlds" ===
"Best of Both Worlds" was released as the album's third single in early 2010, written by Worley and Jim "Moose" Brown, and reached a peak of #43 on the country charts in March 2010.

=== Other songs ===
Worley wrote the majority of the tracks with his regular co-writers, including Wynn Varble and Don Poythress. The final track, "You Never Know", was written by Jimmy Yeary and Mike McGuire (respectively the lead singer and drummer of country band Shenandoah) about the death of former Shenandoah bass guitarist Ralph Ezell, who died in 2007. Worley said that the song was "dead-on" for him, and thought that its second very closely paralleled the relationship between him and his brother. Track 3, "Slow Dancing with a Memory", was carried over from Worley's last album, 2006's Here and Now.

== Critical reception ==
Stephen Thomas Erlewine of Allmusic rated the album three-and-a-half stars out of five. He considered it an improvement in quality over Worley's albums for DreamWorks Records and thought that the slower-tempo songs such as "Tequila on Ice" worked best. Of those songs, he said, "even if they're cluttered with clichés, they're executed well, emphasizing Worley's low-key charms[.]"

== Track listing ==
No.	Title	Writer(s)	Length
1.	"Honkytonk Life"	Marty Dodson, Sean Patrick McGraw	3:35
2.	"Best of Both Worlds"	Jim "Moose" Brown, Darryl Worley	3:53
3.	"Slow Dancin' with a Memory"	Don Poythress, Wynn Varble, Worley	3:43
4.	"Sounds Like Life to Me"	Phil O'Donnell, Varble, Worley	3:44
5.	"Doin' What's Right"	Dan Demay, Worley	3:26
6.	"Tequila on Ice"	Dodson, Rivers Rutherford	3:00
7.	"Everyday Love"	Poythress, Varble, Worley	3:11
8.	"Nothing but Money"	Brown, Steve Leslie, Worley	3:53
9.	"Don't Show Up (If You Can't Get Down)" (featuring Bill Anderson, John Anderson, Mel Tillis, Jamey Johnson, Smash Mouth)	Brown, Kevin Grantt, Worley	6:09
10.	"Messed Up in Memphis"	Demay, Leslie, Worley	3:51
11.	"You Never Know"	Mike McGuire, Billy Ryan, Jimmy Yeary	3:20

== Personnel ==
- Bill Anderson – vocals on track 9
- John Anderson – vocals on track 9
- Kelly Back – electric guitar, baritone guitar
- Jim "Moose" Brown – Producer, acoustic guitar, electric guitar, Hammond B-3 organ, keyboards, piano, electric piano, strings, tambourine, background vocals, Wurlitzer piano
- Pat Buchanan – harmonica
- J.T. Corenflos – electric guitar
- John Cowan – background vocals
- Mark Crum – bass guitar
- Ira Dean – background vocals
- Gilbert Donovan – bass vocals
- Tom Drenon – drums
- Glen Duncan – banjo
- Kevin "Swine" Grantt – bass guitar, background vocals
- Steve Harwell – vocals on track 9
- Larry Hazelbaker – electric guitar, piano, Wurlitzer piano
- Steve Hinson – slide guitar
- Jeff Jared – acoustic guitar, baritone guitar, electric guitar, slide guitar
- Jamey Johnson – vocals on track 9
- Jeff King – 12-string guitar, baritone guitar, electric guitar
- Troy Lancaster – baritone guitar, electric guitar
- B. James Lowry – acoustic guitar
- James Mitchell – electric guitar
- Shaun Murphy – background vocals
- Phil O'Donnell – dobro, acoustic guitar
- Scott Randon – percussion, background vocals
- Steve Sheehan – acoustic guitar
- Chris Stapleton – background vocals
- Mel Tillis – vocals on track 9
- Wynn Varble – background vocals
- Darryl Worley – lead vocals
- Curtis Wright – background vocals

== Chart performance ==
=== Album ===
Chart (2009)	Peak position
U.S. Billboard 200	172
U.S. Billboard Top Country Albums	26
U.S. Billboard Top Independent Albums	35

=== Singles ===
Year	Single	Peak chart positions	
Year	Single	US Country	US
2008	"Tequila on Ice"	44	—
2009	"Sounds Like Life to Me"	11	84
2010	"Best of Both Worlds"	43	—
"—" denotes releases that did not chart
