= It's the Way You Love Me =

It's the Way You Love Me may refer to:

- "It's the Way You Love Me", a 2006 song by Darryl Worley from Here and Now
- "It's the Way You Love Me", a 2009 song by David Guetta featuring Kelly Rowland from One Love
