= Sounds Like Life to Me =

Single by Darryl Worley

from the album Sounds Like Life
- Released: January 27, 2009
- Genre: Country
- Length: 3:44 (album version); 3:18 (radio edit)
- Label: Stroudavarious
- Songwriters: Phil O'Donnell; Wynn Varble; Darryl Worley
- Producer: Jim "Moose" Brown

Darryl Worley singles chronology
"Tequila on Ice" (2008)	"Sounds Like Life to Me" (2009)	"Best of Both Worlds" (2010)

"Sounds Like Life to Me" is a song co-written and recorded by American country music artist Darryl Worley. It was released in January 2009 as the second single from his album Sounds Like Life. The song made its chart debut in early 2009, becoming Worley's first Top 40 country hit since "I Just Came Back from a War" in late 2006-early 2007. It was written by Worley, Wynn Varble and Phil O'Donnell.

== Content ==
Worley co-wrote "Sounds Like Life to Me" with Wynn Varble (who has also written several of Worley's other singles) and Phil O'Donnell. In the song's first verse, the male narrator receives a call from a friend's wife, who says that her husband "fell off the wagon" and has begun drinking excessively to escape his problems. The narrator then meets his friend at the bar and ask the friend what is wrong. After the friend lists off his problems, the narrator responds, "sounds like life to me", convincing the friend to "suck it up" and face his problems. When the friend reveals that his fourth child could be on the way, the narrator buys him a drink and makes a toast.

== Music video ==
The music video was directed by The Erwin Brothers. It depicts the events described in the lyrics, and concludes with Worley driving his friend back home to reconcile with his wife.

== Chart performance ==
Chart (2009)	Peak position
Canada Country (Billboard)	37
US Billboard Hot 100	84
US Hot Country Songs (Billboard)	11

=== Year-end charts ===
Chart (2009)	Position
US Country Songs (Billboard)	38
