= Darryl Worley (album) =

Studio album by Darryl Worley
- Released: November 2, 2004
- Genre: Country
- Length: 48:46
- Label: DreamWorks Nashville
- Producer: Frank Rogers

Darryl Worley chronology
Have You Forgotten? (2003)	Darryl Worley (2004)	Here and Now (2006)

Singles from Darryl Worley
- 1. "Awful, Beautiful Life" Released: June 28, 2004; 2. "If Something Should Happen" Released: February 28, 2005

Professional ratings
Review scores
Source	Rating
Allmusic	3.5/5 stars

Darryl Worley is the third studio album by the American country music singer Darryl Worley, released on November 2, 2004. Like his previous two albums, it was released on the DreamWorks Records Nashville label. The lead-off single, "Awful, Beautiful Life", became Worley's third and final Number One hit on the Hot Country Songs charts. "If Something Should Happen" made Top Ten on the same chart, while "I Love Her, She Hates Me" peaked at #59. After the latter single was released, DreamWorks was closed, and Worley exited for 903 music, a label started by Neal McCoy.

== Track listing ==
No.	Title	Writer(s)	Length
1.	"Awful, Beautiful Life"	Harley Allen, Darryl Worley	3:52
2.	"If I Could Tell the Truth"	Jerry Salley, Worley	3:42
3.	"I Love Her, She Hates Me"	Casey Beathard, Buddy Brock, Kim Williams	3:33
4.	"If Something Should Happen"	Jim Brown, Dan Demay, Dave Turnbull	4:40
5.	"Work and Worry"	Steve Leslie, Worley	4:01
6.	"If It Hadn't Been for Love"	Mike Henderson, Chris Stapleton	4:13
7.	"Was It Good for You"	Beathard, Jim Collins, Tim Owens	3:27
8.	"Find Me"	Don Poythress, Wynn Varble, Worley	3:50
9.	"Wake Up America"	Frank Rogers, Stapleton, Worley	4:14
10.	"What Makes a Man Do That"	John Michael Davis, Rogers, Worley	4:20
11.	"Better Than I Deserve"	Tom Shapiro, Beathard	4:05
12.	"Whistle Dixie"	Worley	4:40
Total length:			48:46

== Personnel ==
- Jim "Moose" Brown - Hammond organ, piano
- Melodie Crittenden - choir
- Eric Darken - percussion, vibraphone
- Matt Davich - clarinet
- Kevin "Swine" Grantt - bass guitar
- Aubrey Haynie - fiddle, mandolin
- Wes Hightower - choir, background vocals
- Steve Hinson - dobro, steel guitar
- Sharif Iman - choir
- Greg Morrow - drums, percussion, shaker
- Joe Murphy - tuba
- Kim Parent - choir
- Neal Rosengarden - trumpet
- Brent Rowan - baritone guitar, electric guitar
- Chris Stapleton - background vocals
- Bryan Sutton - banjo, acoustic guitar, hi-string guitar
- Darryl Worley - lead vocals
- Curtis Wright - background vocals

== Chart performance ==
Chart (2004)	Peak position
U.S. Billboard Top Country Albums	12
U.S. Billboard 200	72
