= Rock You Baby =

Single by Toby Keith

from the album Unleashed
- Released: January 6, 2003
- Recorded: 2002
- Genre: Country
- Length: 4:01 (album version); 3:39 (single version)
- Label: DreamWorks Nashville
- Songwriters: Toby Keith; Scotty Emerick
- Producers: James Stroud; Toby Keith

Toby Keith singles chronology
"Who's Your Daddy?" (2002)	"Rock You Baby" (2003)	"Beer for My Horses" (2003)

"Rock You Baby" is a song co-written and recorded by American country music artist Toby Keith. It was released in January 2003 as the third single released from his 2003 album Unleashed. The song peaked at number 13 on the US Billboard Hot Country Songs chart in March 2003. Keith wrote this song with Scotty Emerick.

== Content ==
The song's narrator is promising a lonely woman that he will love and comfort her.

== Chart performance ==
"Rock You Baby" debuted at number 55 on the U.S. Billboard Hot Country Songs chart for the week of January 18, 2003. The song peaked on the Billboard Hot 100 on March 22, 2003. It later peaked at number 13 on Hot Country Songs for the chart week dated March 29, 2003, becoming his first single to miss the Top 10 since 1999's "When Love Fades". Its lower peaking position can be attributed to the early release of Keith's next single, "Beer For My Horses", which had been receiving significant airplay as an album cut while "Rock You Baby" was on the charts.

== Charts ==
Chart (2003)	Peak position
US Hot Country Songs (Billboard)	13
US Billboard Hot 100	66
