= I Miss My Friend =

Studio album by Darryl Worley
- Released: July 18, 2002
- Genre: Country
- Length: 41:53
- Label: DreamWorks Nashville
- Producer: James Stroud and Frank Rogers

Darryl Worley chronology
Hard Rain Don't Last (2000)	I Miss My Friend (2002)	Have You Forgotten? (2003)

Singles from I Miss My Friend
- 1. "I Miss My Friend" Released: March 11, 2002; 2. "Family Tree" Released: October 19, 2002

Professional ratings
Review scores
Source	Rating
Allmusic	link

I Miss My Friend is the second studio album by American country music singer Darryl Worley released on July 16, 2002. The album produced Worley's first number one single on the Hot Country Songs charts in its title track; "Family Tree" was also a Top 30 hit for him on the same chart. "Tennessee River Run" was later reprised on Worley's first compilation album Have You Forgotten?, from which it was released as that album's second single.

"POW 369" was also recorded by Doug Stone on his 2002 album The Long Way, from which it was released as a single.

== Track listing ==
No.	Title	Writer(s)	Length
1.	"Tennessee River Run"	Steve Leslie, Darryl Worley	3:23
2.	"I Wouldn't Mind the Shackles"	Howard Perdew, Worley	3:42
3.	"I Miss My Friend"	Tony Martin, Mark Nesler, Tom Shapiro	4:02
4.	"Callin' Caroline"	Leslie, Frank Rogers, Worley	3:11
5.	"Family Tree"	Darrell Scott	3:22
6.	"Back Where I Belong"	Randy Hardison, Leslie, Worley	3:20
7.	"The Least That You Can Do"	Walt Aldridge, Worley	4:01
8.	"I Built This Wall"	Jerry Salley, Worley	3:06
9.	"Opportunity of a Lifetime"	Randy Hardison, Wynn Varble, Worley	3:23
10.	"Spread a Little Love Around"	Harley Allen, John Wiggins	2:52
11.	"POW 369"	Stephen Dale Jones	3:41
12.	"Where You Think You're Goin'?"	Shawn Camp, Brice Long, Varble	3:43
Total length:			41:53

== Personnel ==
- Eddie Bayers- drums
- Larry Beaird- acoustic guitar
- Mike Brignardello- bass guitar
- Melodie Crittenden- background vocals
- Eric Darken- percussion
- C.A. Dreyer- finger snaps
- Paul Franklin- dobro, steel guitar
- Kevin "Swine" Grantt- bass guitar
- Randy Hardison- finger snaps, background vocals
- Aubrey Haynie- fiddle, mandolin
- Wes Hightower- vocal ad-libs, background vocals
- Rob Ickes- dobro
- Kirk "Jelly Roll" Johnson- harmonica
- Brice Long- finger snaps, background vocals
- Brent Mason- electric guitar
- The Nashville String Machine- strings
- Steve Nathan- organ, piano
- Kimberly Perkins- finger snaps
- Frank Rogers- finger snaps
- Manny Rogers- laughing on "Family Tree"
- Bryan Sutton- acoustic guitar, mandolin
- Wynn Varble- finger snaps, background vocals
- Biff Watson- acoustic guitar
- Bergen White- conductor, string arrangements
- Brian David Willis- percussion
- Darryl Worley- finger snaps, lead vocals
- Curtis Wright- background vocals

== Charts ==
=== Weekly charts ===
Chart (2002)	Peak position
US Billboard 200	21
US Top Country Albums (Billboard)	1

=== Year-end charts ===
Chart (2002)	Position
US Top Country Albums (Billboard)	43
