= Shea Fisher =

Australian-born country music singer

- Born: Shea Fisher; April 1988 (age 38)
- Origin: Portland, Victoria, Australia
- Genres: Country
- Occupation: Singer
- Instruments: Vocals; guitar
- Years active: 2007–present
- Label: ABC Music
- Website: Official website

Shea Fisher (Born in Portland Victoria in April 1988) is an Australian-born country music singer. She has moved to the United States to begin a career in country music, signing to Stroudavarious Records that year. She also has a record deal with ABC Music in Australia.

== Biography ==
Fisher released her debut single, "Just The Excuse", and debut album "Everyday Girl" in Australia in July 2007 after being signed to Australian label ABC Music in April 2007. She had two #1 songs off this first album with songs "Just the excuse" and "Everyday Girl". In early 2009, James Stroud heard music from Fisher's second album "Shea" and signed her to, Stroudavarious Records where Richard Landis and Steve Forde produce her music. The first single off the album, "Don't Chase Me", was released in April 2009 and was made into a music video directed by Trey Fanjoy. She had two #1 songs off her 2nd album with hit songs "Don't chase me" and "Suitcase". "Don't chase me" was also a top 20 on CMT and GAC in the US and was aired on CMC in Australia.

Her father is Australian rodeo cowboy Eddie Fisher, who specialized in bareback riding and bull riding and bareback riding. Her mother, Joanne Fisher, specialized in barrel racing. Shea grew up travelling the country on the rodeo circuit. At age 10, Shea's family moved to the United States where she lived for three years while her father Eddie was competing on the PBR Bud Light Cup Tour.

In 2007, at the age of 19, Shea signed a record deal with ABC Music and released her debut album, titled "Everyday Girl" the same year. She wrote nine of the 11 songs on her first album. After the release of her first album, Shea went on tour throughout Australia and was not only the most requested artist on CMC, but she sold the most albums of any new country artists and had the most No.1 songs of any new country artist that year.

Shea is also known as the "true country music cowgirl of Australia", as many consider that in addition to her songs, which capture the audiences of Australia and America, but her live shows with electric guitars and back up dancers entertain fans of all ages.

Shea is also known for her television and modeling work. Shea has been the face of many international brands such as Cruel Girl, Rock & Roll Cowgirl, Gypsy Soule, Cowgirl Up, Coral Boots, Mac Make-Up and Maui Jim sunglasses. Featured on the cover and in some of the biggest western magazines around the world, Shea is also the TV host for PBR Australia and a new American western show, Project Cowboy.

Shea is married to American professional rodeo cowboy Tyson Durfey, who won the 2016 PRCA world championship in calf roping and has qualified for the National Finals Rodeo in Las Vegas several times. They have three children.

== Discography ==
=== Studio albums ===
Title	Details	Peak positions
Title	Details	AUS Country
Everyday Girl	Release date: 9 July 2007; Label: ABC Music	3
Shea	Release date: 20 March 2009; Label: ABC Music	1

=== Singles ===
Year	Single	Album
2007	"Everyday Girl"	Everyday Girl
2007	"Just the Excuse"	Everyday Girl
2009	"Don't Chase Me"	Shea
2009	"Suitcase"	Shea
2009	"Getaway Heart"	Shea

=== Music videos ===
Year	Video	Director
2007	"Everyday Girl"	
2007	"Just the Excuse"	
2009	"Don't Chase Me"	Trey Fanjoy
2009	"Suitcase"	Myles Conti
2009	"Getaway Heart"	
2016	"Tough"	Duncan Toombs
2016	"Tattoo"	
