= Hard Rain Don't Last =

Studio album by Darryl Worley
- Released: July 18, 2000
- Recorded: 1999–2000
- Genre: Country
- Length: 41:05
- Label: DreamWorks Nashville
- Producer: James Stroud, Frank Rogers

Darryl Worley chronology
Hard Rain Don't Last (2000)	I Miss My Friend (2002)

Hard Rain Don't Last is the debut studio album by American country music singer Darryl Worley. It was released on July 18, 2000, via DreamWorks Records. The tracks "When You Need My Love", "A Good Day to Run", "Second Wind" and "Sideways" were all released as singles from this album. While the first three singles all reached Top 20 on the Hot Country Songs charts, "Sideways" peaked at No. 41.

== Critical reception ==
Professional ratings
Review scores
Source	Rating
AllMusic	4/5 stars
Entertainment Weekly	B+

Billboard called "A Good Day to Run" a "free-wheeling, light-spirited cut" and a "strong single."

== Track listing ==
No.	Title	Writer(s)	Length
1.	"A Good Day to Run"	Bobby Tomberlin, Darryl Worley	3:08
2.	"Who's Gonna Get Me Over You"	Tony Martin, Mark Nesler	2:55
3.	"Second Wind"	Steve Leslie, Worley	4:21
4.	"Hard Rain Don't Last"	Rob Crosby, Worley	3:09
5.	"Too Many Pockets"	Leslie, Worley	2:52
6.	"Those Less Fortunate Than I"	Nesler	3:56
7.	"When You Need My Love"	Wynn Varble, Worley	3:39
8.	"Sideways"	J. B. Rudd, Vip Vipperman, Worley	2:45
9.	"The Way Things Are Goin"	Mark D. Sanders, Worley	3:45
10.	"Feels Like Work"	Leslie, Worley	3:10
11.	"Is It Just Us"	Jerry Salley, Worley	3:37
12.	"If I Could Just Be Me"	Leslie, Worley	3:48
Total length:			41:05

== Personnel ==
- Eddie Bayers – drums
- Larry Beaird – acoustic guitar
- Ron Block – banjo
- J. T. Corenflos – electric guitar
- Melodie Crittenden – background vocals
- Glen Duncan – fiddle, mandolin
- Paul Franklin – steel guitar, dobro
- Kevin Grantt – bass guitar
- Randy Hardison – drums, percussion, finger snaps
- Aubrey Haynie – fiddle, mandolin
- Wes Hightower – background vocals, vocal horns
- John Hobbs – piano, keyboards
- Brent Mason – electric guitar
- Steve Nathan – piano, keyboards
- Frank Rogers – finger snaps
- Matt Rollings – piano, keyboards
- Brent Rowan – electric guitar
- Biff Watson – acoustic guitar
- Brian David Willis – percussion
- Darryl Worley – lead vocals, finger snaps
- Curtis Wright – background vocals

== Chart performance ==
Chart (2000)	Peak position
U.S. Billboard Top Country Albums	33
U.S. Billboard Top Heatseekers	39
