= If Something Should Happen =

Single by Darryl Worley

from the album Darryl Worley
- Released: February 28, 2005
- Recorded: 2004
- Genre: Country
- Length: 4:40 (album version); 3:54 (radio edit)
- Label: DreamWorks Nashville
- Songwriters: Jim Brown; Dan Demay; Dave Turnbull
- Producer: Frank Rogers

Darryl Worley singles chronology
"Awful, Beautiful Life" (2004)	"If Something Should Happen" (2005)	"I Love Her, She Hates Me" (2005)

"If Something Should Happen" is a song written by Dave Turnbull, Jim Brown and Dan Demay, and recorded by American country music artist Darryl Worley. It was released in February 2005 as the second single from his self-titled album. It peaked at number 9 on Billboard magazine's Hot Country Songs chart for the chart week of June 25, 2005.

== Content ==
The song addresses a father scheduled to go in for surgery to remove what is strongly implied to be cancer, discussing his fears with his childhood friend. He requests the friend look after his family in the event that "something should happen," stopping in with his wife to check on the singer's wife and looking out for his nine year-old son as he grows up.

== Music video ==
The music video was directed by Shaun Silva. It features Worley on top of various buildings, and various places in Nashville, Tennessee.

== Chart performance ==
"If Something Should Happen" debuted at number 52 on the U.S. Billboard Hot Country Singles & Tracks for the week of March 2, 2005.

Chart (2005)	Peak position
Canada Country (Radio & Records)	26
US Hot Country Songs (Billboard)	9
US Billboard Hot 100	75

=== Year-end charts ===
Chart (2005)	Position
US Country Songs (Billboard)	54
