= Pyburn, Tennessee =

Unincorporated community in Tennessee, US

Coordinates: 35°05′28″N 88°15′15″W

Pyburn is an unincorporated community in Hardin County, Tennessee, United States, in the southwestern part of the state. Although born in Memphis, Tennessee, it is where country music singer Darryl Worley grew up.
