= Houston County (band) =

- Origin: Houston County, Alabama, United States
- Genres: Country
- Years active: 2006-2009
- Labels: Stroudavarious
- Past members: Adam Hooper; Zack Hooper; John Milldrum

Houston County was an American country music trio formerly signed to Stroudavarious Records. The group is composed of brothers Zack Hooper (lead vocals) and Adam Hooper (bass guitar), as well as John Milldrum (lead guitar). The trio released its debut single "I Can't Make It Rain" in September 2009, and it debuted at No. 58 on the Billboard Hot Country Songs chart dated for the week of October 31, 2009. Karlie Justus of Engine 145 gave the song a thumbs-up, saying that it had "weak opening chords" but that it was "lyrically interesting." The band has also filmed a music video for this song.

== Discography ==
=== Singles ===
Year	Single	Peak positions
Year	Single	US Country
2009	"I Can't Make It Rain"	48

=== Music videos ===
Year	Video	Director
2010	"I Can't Make It Rain"	Trey Fanjoy
