= I Just Came Back from a War =

Single by Darryl Worley

from the album Here and Now
- B-side: "Livin' in the Here and Now"
- Released: September 26, 2006
- Genre: Country
- Length: 5:27 (album version); 4:15 (radio edit)
- Label: 903 Music
- Songwriters: Darryl Worley; Wynn Varble
- Producer: Frank Rogers

Darryl Worley singles chronology
"Nothin' but a Love Thang" (2006)	"I Just Came Back from a War" (2006)	"Livin' in the Here and Now" (2007)

"I Just Came Back from a War" is a song co-written and recorded by American country music artist Darryl Worley. It was released in September 2006 as the second single from his album Here and Now. It peaked at number 18 on Billboard magazine's Hot Country Songs chart and reached number 15 on the U.S. Billboard Bubbling Under Hot 100. The song was written by Worley and Wynn Varble.

== Content ==
The song was inspired by a war veteran Worley met who was having a difficult time adjusting to life back home after being in a war zone for many months. Worley says, "It made me think about what it must be like for all the soldiers, who have served in conflicts past and present, to adjust to being back home. The strain of war must be incredible." He adds, "This song is from the soldier's perspective and the message is, 'Hey man, cut me a little slack if I need a little time to re-adjust here. I'll get there but be a little patient with me - I just came back from a war."

== Music video ==
The music video was directed by Jacob Hatley and premiered in December 7, 2006. It features Darryl Worley singing along with showing soldiers going through their daily lives.

== Chart performance ==
"I Just Came Back from a War" debuted at number 52 on the U.S. Billboard Hot Country Singles & Tracks for the week of September 30, 2006.

Chart (2006)	Peak position
US Hot Country Songs (Billboard)	18
US Bubbling Under Hot 100 (Billboard)	15
