= Have You Forgotten? =

Single by Darryl Worley

from the album Have You Forgotten?
- B-side: "I Miss My Friend"
- Released: March 10, 2003
- Genre: Country
- Length: 4:03
- Label: DreamWorks
- Songwriters: Wynn Varble; Darryl Worley
- Producers: Frank Rogers; James Stroud

Darryl Worley singles chronology
"Family Tree" (2002)	"Have You Forgotten?" (2003)	"Tennessee River Run" (2003)

"Have You Forgotten?" is a song about the September 11 attacks recorded by American country music artist Darryl Worley, who wrote it with Wynn Varble. It was released in March 2003 as the first single and title track from his 2003 compilation album of the same name. It was a number one hit on the US Billboard Hot Country Songs chart for seven weeks, reaching it after five weeks on the chart. The song also peaked at number 22 on the US Billboard Hot 100, making it Worley's biggest mainstream hit. On June 30, 2023, Worley released a sequel to this song called "Have We Forgotten".

== Composition, radio play, and first performances ==
In December 2002, Worley performed for United States soldiers in Afghanistan and Kuwait. Worley debuted the song at the Grand Ole Opry during performances on January 10 and 11, 2003. After Worley's Grand Ole Opry performance, a live recording was made available online, followed later by a studio recording. The song quickly grew in popularity, and the single was widely requested by country radio listeners before it was commercially available. In the weeks before the US-led invasion of Iraq, some stations were hesitant to play the song because of its perceived pro-war message, but by March 3, 2003, it had been played by 128 of the 150 country stations that report to Billboard.

Worley appeared on The Today Show on February 28, 2003, and performed the song on Lou Dobbs Moneyline on March 11, 2003. Worley performed to a standing ovation at the CMT Annual "Flameworthy Music Awards" on April 7, 2003. On April 16 of that year he was introduced by Defense Secretary Donald Rumsfeld before performing the song at the Pentagon. A report from the American Forces Press Service said the performance brought tears to Rumsfeld's eyes.

== Lyrics and interpretations ==
According to contemporary articles, listeners believed the song suggested "a link between al Qaeda leader Osama bin Laden and Iraqi President Saddam Hussein," and writers for various publications have alleged the same. The Village Voice called the song an "attempt to tie together the Sept. 11, 2001, terrorist attacks and the run-up to the Iraq war," The Los Angeles Times said the song has a "pro-war call to action," and the Chicago Tribune said the song "essentially reads like a Bush position paper for entering Iraq with guns blazing." The Hartford Courant described the song as "a plea that thinly links the Sept. 11 terrorist attacks with the need to bomb Iraq," and "a page ripped right out of a White House briefing."

Writing in Salon, Eric Boehlert drew attention to Worley's comments about the song's meaning. He accused Worley of trying to be "cute about the song's real meaning, implying the 'war' in 'Have You Forgotten?' is the war on terrorism," not Iraq.

Other publications perceived a pro-war message not specifically related to the war in Iraq. The Country Music Reader said the song was one of several that "expressed the anger of many hawkish Americans" and "presented country music as the voice of the conservative, pro-war right."

Academic writers have used the song to illustrate specific elements of historical and political concepts. Discussing the war in Iraq, Gerard Toal writes that the song helps explain the "disjuncture between prevailing international sentiment and majority American opinion: 'Some say this country's just out looking for a fight / After 9/11, man, I'd have to say that's right.'"

Writing in the collection Country Music Goes to War, Randy Rudder addressed listener confusion around the song, saying that Worley would win the CMA Award for "Most Misunderstood Artist" if such a category existed. Rudder says that the song's release roughly coincided with the American-led invasion of Iraq, but that it did not refer specifically to the war there.

Peter J. Schmelz writes about the timing of the song in greater detail in his essay "'Have you Forgotten?': Darryl Worley and the Musical Politics of Operation Iraqi Freedom." In his essay, Schemlz analyzes differences between two recordings of the song. The first version is a live recording from one of its first public performances at the Grand Ole Opry in early January 2003. The second version is a studio recording, released several months later. Lyrical changes between the two, Schmelz says, "reveal the changing perception of the justification for the invasion of Iraq." In the live versions of the song from January, Worley ends the second chorus with either "You say we shouldn't worry 'bout bin Laden" or "Don't you tell me not to worry about bin Laden." In the studio version, the second chorus ends with "And we vowed to get the ones behind bin Laden."

The meaning of the song has also been discussed in theses, dissertations, and conference papers.

=== Worley's comments ===
Although Worley maintained that "there is a connection there" between Iraq and al-Qaeda, he denied that the song endorsed the war in Iraq and suggested that the lyrics should be taken at face value: "The song is posing a question: Have you forgotten what happened to our country on 9/11? That's pretty much the size of it."

Worley discussed the song in a March 11, 2003, appearance on CNN's Lou Dobbs Moneyline, saying, "The song is pro-America. It's pro — it's pro-military. But I don't necessarily think that it's a pro-war song." He also recounted his own experience with grieving, and described the importance of remembering the departed. Worley then compared the grieving process to people's reactions to 9/11: "I think probably more people than not probably felt that way about this, because it was gone from the TV screen so fast, it was like, wow, you know, they want us to forget this, it's over. I think we have to move on and get past things, but I don't think it's good to forget things like this. I think we need to remember."

== Critical reception ==
The song received mixed critical reviews, with much of the commentary centered on the single's political stance. Village Voice named the song its 11th worst of the decade. Rick Cohoon of Allmusic, in his review, said that the song "basically tells us that because of what happened on 9/11 we have a moral obligation to enter combat against those who perpetrate terror." He states that the only problem is that "the song’s argument seems mainly to target U.S. involvement in Afghanistan and the war on terror, which few Americans oppose. If that is the aim, Worley is essentially preaching to the choir." In his conclusion Cohoon states that "the song is cleverly written and will definitely bring tears to your eyes." The article "Music, Musicians, and the War on Terrorism" asserted that the song "makes a spurious connection between Iraq and the September 11 attacks."

Commercially, the song was popular with some of the American public. It reached number one on the U.S. Billboard Hot Country Singles & Tracks and No. 22 on the U.S. Billboard Hot 100.

== Music video ==
The music video was directed by Shaun Silva. It debuted March 8, 2003 on CMT Most Wanted Live.

== Chart performance ==
"Have You Forgotten?" debuted at No. 41 on the U.S. Billboard Hot Country Singles & Tracks for the week of March 8, 2003.

Chart (2003)	Peak position
US Billboard Hot 100	22
US Hot Country Songs (Billboard)	1

=== Year-end charts ===
Chart (2003)	Position
US Country Songs (Billboard)	12
US Billboard Hot 100	90

== See also ==
- Aftermath of the September 11 attacks
- Saddam–al-Qaeda conspiracy theory
- Public opinion in the United States on the invasion of Iraq

== Bibliography ==
- Americans at War. Ed. John P. Resch. Vol. 4: 1946–Present. Detroit: Macmillan Reference USA, 2005. p126-128.
