= Here and Now (Darryl Worley album) =

Studio album by Darryl Worley
- Released: November 21, 2006
- Genre: Country
- Length: 50:50
- Label: 903 Music
- Producer: Frank Rogers

Darryl Worley chronology
Darryl Worley (2004)	Here and Now (2006)	Sounds Like Life (2009)

Singles from Here and Now
- 1. "Nothin' but a Love Thang" Released: May 27, 2006; 2. "I Just Came Back from a War" Released: September 26, 2006

Professional ratings
Review scores
Source	Rating
Allmusic	link

Here and Now is the fourth studio album by American country music singer Darryl Worley, released on November 21, 2006 on 903 Music, owned by country singer Neal McCoy. This album produced two chart singles for Worley on the Hot Country Songs charts: "Nothin' but a Love Thang" at #36, and "I Just Came Back from a War" at #18. The third single, "Living in the Here and Now", reached #54 on the country charts before McCoy announced the closure of 903 Music. "Slow Dancing with a Memory" carried over to Worley's fifth album, Sounds Like Life.

== Track listing ==
All tracks are written by Darryl Worley, with additional co-writers as noted.

No.	Title	Writer(s)	Length
1.	"Jumpin' Off the Wagon"	Don Poythress; Wynn Varble	3:47
2.	"Nothin' but a Love Thang"	Steve Leslie; Chris Stapleton	3:03
3.	"Free"	Frank Rogers	3:22
4.	"It's the Way You Love Me"	Rogers; Barry Worley	3:46
5.	"Party Song"	Jim "Moose" Brown	4:23
6.	"Living in the Here and Now"	Brett Jones	4:19
7.	"Do You Know What That Is"	Brown	3:25
8.	"Thing I'll Never Do Again"	Leslie; Stapleton	4:00
9.	"Slow Dancing with a Memory"	Poythress; Varble	3:44
10.	"Whiskey Makes the World Go Round"	Garry Hannan; Varble	3:42
11.	"Lowdown Women"	Walt Aldridge; Stapleton	3:37
12.	"Nothin' to Lose"	Jeff "Soir" Jared	4:15
13.	"I Just Came Back from a War"	Varble	5:27
Total length:			50:50

== Personnel ==
- Jim "Moose" Brown - Hammond B-3 organ, keyboards, piano, Wurlitzer piano
- Pat Buchanan - electric guitar, slide guitar
- J.T. Corenflos - electric guitar
- Eric Darken - percussion
- Kevin "Swine" Grantt - bass guitar
- Wes Hightower - background vocals
- Tim Lauer - accordion
- B. James Lowry - acoustic guitar, resonator guitar
- Brent Mason - electric guitar
- Greg Morrow - drums
- The Questionnaires - background vocals
- Brent Rowan - 6-string bass guitar, baritone guitar, bass guitar, electric guitar
- Chris Stapleton - background vocals
- Bryan Sutton - banjo, acoustic guitar, national steel guitar, slide guitar
- Darryl Worley - lead vocals

== Chart performance ==
Chart (2006)	Peak position
U.S. Billboard Top Country Albums	35
U.S. Billboard 200	187
U.S. Billboard Independent Albums	11
