= Family Tree (Darryl Worley song) =

Single by Darryl Worley

from the album I Miss My Friend
- Released: October 19, 2002
- Genre: Country
- Length: 3:22
- Label: DreamWorks
- Songwriter(s): Darrell Scott
- Producer(s): Frank Rogers, James Stroud

Darryl Worley singles chronology
"I Miss My Friend" (2002)	"Family Tree" (2002)	"Have You Forgotten?" (2003)

"Family Tree" is a song recorded by American country music artist Darryl Worley. It was released in October 2002 as the second single from the album I Miss My Friend. The song reached #26 on the Billboard Hot Country Singles & Tracks chart. The song was written by Darrell Scott.

== Chart performance ==
Chart (2002)	Peak position
US Hot Country Songs (Billboard)	26
