= Second Wind (song) =

2001 song by Darryl Worley

Single by Darryl Worley

from the album Hard Rain Don't Last
- Released: March 2001
- Recorded: 2000
- Genre: Country
- Length: 4:21
- Label: DreamWorks Nashville
- Songwriters: Darryl Worley, Steve Leslie
- Producers: Frank Rogers, James Stroud

Darryl Worley singles chronology
"A Good Day to Run" (2000)	"Second Wind" (2001)	"Sideways" (2001)

"Second Wind" is a song co-written and recorded by the American country music artist Darryl Worley. It was released in March 2001 as the third and last single from the album Hard Rain Don't Last. The song reached #20 on the Billboard Hot Country Singles & Tracks chart. The song was written by Worley and Steve Leslie.

== Background ==
Musically, this song is somewhat unusual for country music in that the introduction fades in and uses an arrangement and instrumentation, such as synthesizers. The fade out is similar to the introduction. The body of the song is a more typical country ballad.

== Content ==
The song uses the gentle Gulf breezes as a metaphor for overcoming the pain of a break-up. Thus, catching your 'second wind' is both catching a fresh breeze off the Gulf of Mexico and overcoming the adversity of a break-up.

== Chart performance ==
Chart (2001)	Peak position
US Hot Country Songs (Billboard)	20
US Bubbling Under Hot 100 (Billboard)	11
