= Who's Your Daddy? (Toby Keith song) =

Single by Toby Keith

from the album Unleashed
- Released: August 19, 2002
- Genre: Country
- Length: 3:57 (album version); 3:06 (single version)
- Label: DreamWorks
- Songwriter: Toby Keith
- Producers: James Stroud; Toby Keith

Toby Keith singles chronology
"Courtesy of the Red, White and Blue (The Angry American)" (2002)	"Who's Your Daddy?" (2002)	"Rock You Baby" (2003)

"Who's Your Daddy?" is a song written and recorded by American country music artist Toby Keith. It was released in August 2002 as the second single from his 2002 album Unleashed. The song reached number one on the US Billboard Hot Country Singles & Tracks (now Hot Country Songs) chart (his sixth consecutive single to top the chart) and peaked at number 22 on the Billboard Hot 100.

== Background ==
Keith said that he had wanted to write the song for a couple years but never could get the melody the way he wanted. In 2001, he was at home and he discovered the perfect melody for it. Keith explained that the song is about a young woman and a sugar daddy who can't get their love life in order.

Keith also says that "It's everything that I ever wanted to put into a song, it's got the groove, it's got the attitude, it's humorous, it's about a sugar daddy. And it's got a real funny little Elvis thing in it, like 'Viva Las Vegas'... it's got a New Orleans piano in it. You should have seen the band light up when we cut that, they didn't want to quit that groove, it was just an unbelievable groove."

Keith's producer, James Stroud, confirmed the band's enthusiasm. "That song was about 10 minutes long, we let the tape run. Of course the cut on the album is not (that long), but they just played it and played it and had a great time," said Stroud.

== Music video ==
The music video premiered on CMT on September 20, 2002. It features Tiffany Fallon with a cameo appearance by music parodist Cledus T. Judd who pretends Keith's mansion is his own. Keith also mentions the name Barry which is Cledus' real first name. In the video, Keith drives a 2002 concept Ford Mighty F-350 truck.

== Chart performance ==
"Who's Your Daddy?" debuted at number 60 on the U.S. Billboard Hot Country Singles & Tracks for the week of August 17, 2002.

Chart (2002)	Peak position
US Hot Country Songs (Billboard)	1
US Billboard Hot 100	22

=== Year-end charts ===
Chart (2002)	Position
US Country Songs (Billboard)	54

Chart (2003)	Position
US Country Songs (Billboard)	41

== Certifications ==
Region	Certification	Certified units/sales
United States (RIAA)	Platinum	1,000,000^{‡}
^{‡} Sales+streaming figures based on certification alone.

== Parodies ==
- American country music parody artist Cledus T. Judd released a parody of "Who's Your Daddy?" titled "Where's Your Mommy?" on his 2003 album A Six Pack of Judd. The music video featured cameos by fellow country artists Andy Griggs, Montgomery Gentry, and Tracy Byrd.

== Legacy ==
Country rapper, Jelly Roll, used it as his entrance theme when appearing for the WWE.
