= Awful, Beautiful Life =

Single by Darryl Worley

from the album Darryl Worley
- Released: July 12, 2004
- Genre: Country
- Length: 3:52 (album version); 3:35 (radio edit)
- Label: DreamWorks Nashville
- Songwriters: Harley Allen; Darryl Worley
- Producer: Frank Rogers

Darryl Worley singles chronology
"I Will Hold My Ground" (2003)	"Awful, Beautiful Life" (2004)	"If Something Should Happen" (2005)

"Awful, Beautiful Life" is a song recorded by American country music artist Darryl Worley. The song was written by Worley and Harley Allen and produced by Frank Rogers. It was released on July 12, 2004 as the lead single to Worley's self-titled third studio album by DreamWorks Nashville. It is his third and last song to top the US Hot Country Songs chart, where it spent two weeks atop that chart in January 2005. It also peaked at number 30 on the Billboard Hot 100 and number eight on the Radio & Records Canada Country chart.

== Content ==
"Awful, Beautiful Life" is an up-tempo featuring accompaniment from electric guitar.

The story, told in first person, describes the events of a Sunday in a young family man's life. The main protagonist reluctantly goes to church with his wife, despite having been out with his friends the night before. Later, the family attends a cookout and spends time with other family members. Later, everyone prays for a cousin who has been deployed to Iraq, well aware he may never return home alive. That night, as the protagonist lays in bed, he reflects on his day, thankful for his blessings and summing this all up by stating how he "love[s] this crazy, tragic, sometimes almost magic, awful, beautiful life."

== Critical reception ==
People magazine noted that "the country singer exhibits an insightful awareness of life's vagaries" on the song, and designated it as the album's recommended download.

== Music video ==
Directed by Cameron Casey, this video plays out the events related in the song's lyrics; Worley's participation in the events is interspersed with performance shots of him singing while standing in a field, standing by a fence and in front of a barn, and driving an old red chevy convertible. Near the end of the video, Worley is shown picking up his cousin and drops him off at his house.

== Charts ==
"Awful, Beautiful Life" debuted at No. 56 on the Hot Country Singles & Tracks chart the week of July 10, 2004. After a long climb up the chart, the song reached No. 1 the week of January 22, 2005. The song also peaked at No. 30 on the Billboard Hot 100 in early 2005.

Chart (2004–2005)	Peak position
Canada Country (Radio & Records)	8
US Billboard Hot 100	30
US Hot Country Songs (Billboard)	1

=== Year-end charts ===
Chart (2005)	Position
US Country Songs (Billboard)	36

== Release history ==
Release dates and format(s) for "Awful, Beautiful Life"
Region	Date	Format(s)	Label(s)	Ref.
United States	July 12, 2004	Country radio	DreamWorks Nashville	
