= Courtesy of the Red, White and Blue (The Angry American) =

2002 country song by Toby Keith

Single by Toby Keith

from the album Unleashed
- B-side: "Who's Your Daddy"
- Released: May 27, 2002
- Genre: Country
- Length: 3:15
- Label: DreamWorks Nashville 450815
- Songwriter: Toby Keith
- Producer: James Stroud

Toby Keith singles chronology
| "My List" (2002) | "Courtesy of the Red, White and Blue (The Angry American)" (2002) | "Who's Your Daddy?" (2002) |

Music video
- "Courtesy of the Red, White and Blue" on YouTube

"Courtesy of the Red, White and Blue (The Angry American)" is a song written and recorded by American country music artist Toby Keith. The song was written in late 2001, and was inspired by Keith's father's death in March 2001, as well as the September 11 attacks on the United States later that year. It was released in May 2002 as the lead single from the album Unleashed.

== Background ==
At first, Keith refused to record the song and only sang it live at his concerts for military personnel. The reaction, however, was so strong that the Commandant of the Marine Corps James L. Jones told Keith it was his duty as an American citizen to record the song. "It's your job as a singer to lift the morale of the troops," Jones said to Keith. "If you want to serve, that is what you can do."

In a November 2003 interview with CBS, Keith gave his take on the song: "It wasn't written for everybody. And when you write something from your heart – I had a dad that was a veteran, taught me how precious our freedom is – I was so angry when we were attacked here on American soil that it leaked out of me. You know, some people wept when they heard it. Some people got goose bumps. Some people were emotionally moved. Some cheered, turned their fists in the air."

== Controversy ==
ABC invited Keith to sing "Courtesy of the Red, White and Blue (The Angry American)" on a patriotic special it produced in 2002; however, the host of the show, Canadian-born newsman Peter Jennings, requested Keith soften the lyrics of the song or choose another song to sing. Keith refused both requests and did not appear on the special. The rift gave the song a considerable amount of publicity, which led to many national interviews and public performances of the song. During an interview with 60 Minutes, Keith spoke about his public comments about Jennings, saying "I thought it was hilarious. My statement was, 'Isn't he Canadian?' to a bunch of press. They laughed and then I said, 'Well, I bet Dan Rather wouldn't kick me off his show'". Responding to criticisms of the network decision, a representative for ABC stated that because Keith was performing in Utah when the show would broadcast, Keith could be on the program only as the opening act, and that the song was "angry" and "not the kind of tone the producers wanted to use to begin this three-hour celebration."

Keith had a public feud with the Dixie Chicks over both the song and comments they made about President George W. Bush. The lead singer of the Dixie Chicks, Natalie Maines, publicly stated that the song was "ignorant, and it makes country music sound ignorant." Keith responded by belittling Maines' songwriting skills, and by displaying a backdrop at his concerts showing a doctored photo of Maines with Saddam Hussein. On May 21, 2003, Maines wore a T-shirt with the letters "FUTK" on the front at the Academy of Country Music Awards. While a spokesperson for the Dixie Chicks said that the acronym stood for "Friends United in Truth and Kindness", many, including host Vince Gill, took it to be an obscene shot at Keith and understood the acronym to mean "Fuck You Toby Keith". In August 2003, Keith publicly declared he was "all done feuding with Natalie Maines 'cause I guess there's more important things than that to concentrate on".

Maines later admitted that the FUTK shirt was directed at Keith. In the 2006 documentary Dixie Chicks: Shut Up and Sing, backstage footage prior to her appearance wearing the F.U.T.K. shirt recorded the conversation between Maines and Simon Renshaw and confirmed that the original intent of the shirt was in response to Keith's public criticism of her: the letters stood for "Fuck You Toby Keith".

== Commercial performance ==
"Courtesy of the Red, White and Blue (The Angry American)" debuted at number 41 on the U.S. Billboard Hot Country Songs for the week of May 25, 2002, peaking at number one for the week of July 20, 2002. Following Keith's death on February 5, 2024, the single would re-enter the Hot Country Songs chart at number 15 on the chart week dated February 17, 2024, and was one of five Toby Keith songs to re-enter the chart that week. It also re-entered the week ending July 19, 2025, because of digital streaming for the Fourth of July. The single reached number 25 on the Billboard Hot 100 chart, becoming his biggest solo hit on that chart at the time. The song again re-entered the Hot 100 in July 2026, this time at a new peak of number 11.

The single was certified Gold by the Recording Industry Association of America (RIAA) on January 3, 2006, Platinum on March 27, 2012, and 4× Platinum on September 18, 2023. It is his highest certified single in the United States, with over 70 million views on popular streaming platforms. The song has sold 1,607,000 digital copies in the U.S. as of July 2019.

== Track listing ==
CD single
1. "Courtesy of the Red, White and Blue (The Angry American)" – 3:16
2. "Live Introduction by Toby of Single" – 1:30

== Charts and certifications ==
=== Weekly charts ===
2002 weekly chart performance for "Courtesy of the Red, White and Blue (The Angry American)"
| Chart (2002) | Peak position |
|---|---|
| US Billboard Hot 100 | 25 |
| US Hot Country Songs (Billboard) | 1 |

2024 weekly chart performance for "Courtesy of the Red, White and Blue (The Angry American)"
| Chart (2024) | Peak position |
|---|---|
| US Hot Country Songs (Billboard) | 15 |

2025 weekly chart performance for "Courtesy of the Red, White and Blue (The Angry American)"
| Chart (2025) | Peak position |
|---|---|
| Global 200 (Billboard) | 158 |
| US Billboard Hot 100 | 31 |
| US Hot Country Songs (Billboard) | 8 |

2026 weekly chart performance for "Courtesy of the Red, White and Blue (The Angry American)"
| Chart (2026) | Peak position |
|---|---|
| Global 200 (Billboard) | 45 |
| US Billboard Hot 100 | 11 |

=== Year-end charts ===
Year-end chart performance for "Courtesy of the Red, White and Blue (The Angry American)"
| Chart (2002) | Position |
|---|---|
| US Country Songs (Billboard) | 28 |

== Certifications ==
| Region | Certification | Certified units/sales |
|---|---|---|
| United States (RIAA) | 5× Platinum | 5,000,000^{‡} |
^{‡} Sales+streaming figures based on certification alone.
