= Unleashed (Toby Keith album) =

Studio album by Toby Keith
- Released: August 6, 2002
- Genre: Country
- Length: 43:40
- Label: DreamWorks
- Producers: James Stroud; Toby Keith

Toby Keith chronology
Pull My Chain (2001)	Unleashed (2002)	20th Century Masters – The Millennium Collection: The Best of Toby Keith (2003)

Singles from Unleashed
- 1. "Courtesy of the Red, White and Blue (The Angry American)" Released: May 27, 2002; 2. "Who's Your Daddy?" Released: August 19, 2002; 3. "Rock You Baby" Released: January 6, 2003; 4. "Beer For My Horses" Released: April 7, 2003

Professional ratings
Aggregate scores
Source	Rating
Metacritic	(63/100)
Review scores
Source	Rating
Allmusic	4/5 stars
Billboard	(favorable)
Blender	2/5 stars
Robert Christgau	B/E
E! Online	C
Entertainment Weekly	C+
PopMatters	7/10 stars
Q	2/5 stars
Rolling Stone	3/5 stars
The Village Voice	(positive)

Unleashed is the eighth studio album by American country music artist Toby Keith. It was released on August 6, 2002 by DreamWorks Records. The album produced four hit singles on the US Billboard Hot Country Songs charts with "Courtesy of the Red, White and Blue (The Angry American)", "Who's Your Daddy", "Rock You Baby", and "Beer for My Horses" (a duet with Willie Nelson). "Courtesy of the Red, White and Blue (The Angry American)", "Who's Your Daddy", and "Beer for My Horses" all reached number one while "Rock You Baby" peaked at number 13. The album was Keith's first to reach number one on the U.S. Billboard 200 and was 4× Platinum by the RIAA for sales of four million copies in the United States.

Upon reaching number one, "Beer for My Horses" was Keith's longest-lasting number one single, having spent six weeks at the top of the charts. The song also made Nelson the oldest male country singer to reach the top of the country charts at the time.

== Track listing ==
All tracks are written by Toby Keith and Scotty Emerick unless noted otherwise.

No.	Title	Writer(s)	Length
1.	"Courtesy of the Red, White and Blue (The Angry American)"	Keith	3:15
2.	"Who's Your Daddy?"	Keith	3:57
3.	"Good to Go to Mexico"	Keith; Chuck Cannon	2:59
4.	"It's All Good"		3:17
5.	"Beer for My Horses" (featuring Willie Nelson)		3:30
6.	"Losing My Touch"		3:14
7.	"Huckleberry"	Keith; Cannon	3:28
8.	"It Works for Me"		3:03
9.	"Ain't It Just Like You"		3:59
10.	"Rock You Baby"		4:01
11.	"Rodeo Moon"	Keith; Chris LeDoux	3:53
12.	"That's Not How It Is"		3:41
13.	"Live Introduction by Toby Keith of 'Courtesy of the Red, White and Blue (The Angry American)'"		1:29
Total length:			43:40

- Some editions of the CD do not include Track 13

== Personnel ==
- Chris Collins - acoustic guitar, mandolin
- Scotty Emerick - acoustic guitar, background vocals
- Kim Fleming - background vocals
- Shannon Forrest - drums
- Paul Franklin - steel guitar
- Vicki Hampton - background vocals
- Mike Haynes - trumpet
- Wes Hightower - background vocals
- Clayton Ivey - keyboards, piano
- Toby Keith - lead vocals
- Jerry McPherson - electric guitar
- Liana Manis - background vocals
- Brent Mason - electric guitar
- Steve Nathan - keyboards, piano
- Willie Nelson - duet vocals on "Beer for My Horses"
- Michael Rhodes - bass guitar
- John "JR" Robinson - drums
- John Wesley Ryles - background vocals
- Michael Thompson - electric guitar
- Biff Watson - acoustic guitar
- Lari White - background vocals
- Curtis Young - background vocals

== Charts ==
=== Weekly charts ===
Chart (2002)	Peak position
US Billboard 200	1
US Top Country Albums (Billboard)	1

=== Year-end charts ===
Chart (2002)	Position
Canadian Country Albums (Nielsen SoundScan)	14
US Billboard 200	39
US Top Country Albums (Billboard)	7

Chart (2003)	Position
US Billboard 200	20
US Top Country Albums (Billboard)	4

Chart (2004)	Position
US Billboard 200	98
US Top Country Albums (Billboard)	17

== Certifications ==
Region	Certification	Certified units/sales
Canada (Music Canada)	Platinum	100,000^{^}
United States (RIAA)	4× Platinum	4,000,000^{^}
^{^} Shipments figures based on certification alone.
