= Tom Shapiro =

American songwriter

- Born: Tom Curtis Shapiro
- Origin: Kansas City, Missouri, U.S.
- Genres: Country
- Occupations: Songwriter; record producer
- Years active: 1970s–present

Tom Curtis Shapiro (born in Kansas City, Missouri) is an American songwriter and occasional record producer, known primarily for his work in country music. He holds four Country Songwriter of the Year awards from Broadcast Music Incorporated to date, as well as the Songwriter of the Decade award from the Nashville Songwriters Association International. Shapiro has written more than 50 Top-Ten hits including 26 Number Ones.

== Musical career ==
Since the 1970s, Shapiro has been a prominent songwriter, doing most of his work in country music. His first big hit was the international smash "Never Give Up on a Good Thing" by George Benson, released as a single in December 1981, which was a top-five record in 13 countries. Shapiro signed to a publishing contract with Tree International in the 1980s, with Eddy Raven, Crystal Gayle, Marie Osmond, and Lee Greenwood being among the first country acts to cut his material. In 1978, The Shadows released their cover of Shapiro's song "Love Deluxe". His career continued throughout the 1990s and into the 2000s, with several of his cuts topping the Billboard Hot Country Songs charts. Among the No. 1 hits are "Wink" by Neal McCoy, which received BMI's Robert J. Burton award for being the most performed country song of 1994; "No Place That Far" by Sara Evans; "I Miss My Friend" by Darryl Worley (both of which were their respective artists' first Number Ones); and "Ain't Nothing 'Bout You" by Brooks & Dunn, which was named by Billboard as the No. 1 country song of 2001.

In 2008, Shapiro was inducted into the Nashville Songwriter's Hall of Fame. As of 2013, Shapiro had had 57 Top-10 hits, including 26 number ones. In addition, Shapiro has produced albums for Billy Dean and Dusty Springfield, as well as writing several singles for the former.
