= A Good Day to Run =

2000 single by Darryl Worley

Single by Darryl Worley

from the album Hard Rain Don't Last
- Released: September 25, 2000
- Recorded: 1999–2000
- Genre: Country
- Length: 3:08
- Label: DreamWorks Nashville
- Songwriters: Bobby Tomberlin; Darryl Worley
- Producers: Frank Rogers; James Stroud

Darryl Worley singles chronology
"When You Need My Love" (2000)	"A Good Day to Run" (2000)	"Second Wind" (2001)

"A Good Day to Run" is a song co-written and recorded by American country music artist Darryl Worley. It was released in September 2000 as the second single from his debut album Hard Rain Don't Last. It peaked at number 12 on the United States Billboard Hot Country Singles & Tracks chart and at number 76 on the U.S. Billboard Hot 100. The song was written by Worley and Bobby Tomberlin.

== Content ==
The song is an uptempo and the narrator is a blue-collar worker who breaks free of his day job. He states it looks like "a good day to run".

== Critical reception ==
In one positive review, Chuck Taylor for Billboard Magazine called Worley's phrasing "undeniably country and as appealing as his performance was on the ballad 'When You Need My Love'", and said he "demonstrates more vocal personality." Billboard magazine also called "A Good Day to Run" a "free-wheeling, light-spirited cut" and a "strong single."

== Music video ==
The music video was directed by Trey Fanjoy, and features Worley singing the song on a stage outside, and on the road in a Jeep Wrangler. The video was filmed near Worley's hometown in Savannah, Tennessee.

== Chart performance ==
"A Good Day to Run" debuted at number 62 on the U.S. Billboard Hot Country Singles & Tracks for the chart week of October 7, 2000. It also debuted at number 74 on the Canadian RPM Country Tracks for the week of November 6, 2000 but never peaked as the magazine ceased publication the next week.

Chart (2000–2001)	Peak position
Canada Country Singles (RPM)	74 (Note: "A Good Day to Run" had not yet peaked when RPM ceased publication in November 2000.)
US Billboard Hot 100	76
US Hot Country Songs (Billboard)	12

=== Year-end charts ===
Chart (2001)	Position
US Country Songs (Billboard)	50
