= When You Need My Love =

Single by Darryl Worley

from the album Hard Rain Don't Last
- B-side: "Who's Gonna Get Me Over You"
- Released: March 13, 2000
- Genre: Country
- Length: 3:39
- Label: DreamWorks Nashville
- Songwriters: Wynn Varble; Darryl Worley
- Producers: Frank Rogers; James Stroud

Darryl Worley singles chronology
"When You Need My Love" (2000)	"A Good Day to Run" (2000)

"When You Need My Love" is a debut song co-written and recorded by American country music artist Darryl Worley. It was released in March 2000 as the first single from his debut album Hard Rain Don't Last. It peaked at #15 on the United States country chart and at #75 on the Hot 100. It also peaked at #30 on the Canadian country chart. The song was written by Worley and Wynn Varble.

== Content ==
The song is about a girl that thinks she can keep coming back to the narrator when she has problems in her new relationship. The narrator wishes he could get over her because she just uses him for when she needs him because he can't tell her no.

== Music video ==
Darryl Worley's first music video was co-directed by Mark Tucker and Jimmy Abegg.

== Chart performance ==
"When You Need My Love" debuted at number 70 on the U.S. Billboard Hot Country Singles & Tracks for the chart week of April 1, 2000.

Chart (2000)	Peak position
Canada Country Singles (RPM)	30
US Billboard Hot 100	75
US Hot Country Songs (Billboard)	15

=== Year-end charts ===
Chart (2000)	Position
US Country Songs (Billboard)	58
