= R&J Records =

American independent record label

- Founded: 2011
- Founder: James Stroud, Rick Carter
- Distributor: RED Distribution
- Genre: Country
- Country of origin: U.S.
- Location: Nashville, Tennessee
- Official website: www.randjrecords.com

R&J Records is an American independent record label specializing in country music. It was founded in May 2011 by James Stroud and Rick Carter. Stroud is a record producer and former president of Giant Records and DreamWorks Records. In 2008, Stroud launched Stroudavarious Records and signed many artists to that label. Most Stroudavarious artists' contracts were moved to the new label, whereas some other previous artists signed with Stroudavarious have moved to other record labels.

== Stroudavarious Records ==
Stroudavarious Records
- Founded: 2008
- Founder: James Stroud
- Defunct: 2011
- Distributor: RED Distribution
- Genre: Country
- Country of origin: U.S.
- Location: Nashville, Tennessee
- Official website: www.atlanticrecords.com

Stroud founded Stroudavarious Records in July 2008. The label's roster consisted of new artists and artists who had signed to major labels. It had many artists signed to Stroudavarious, including Aaron Lewis, LoCash Cowboys, Shelly Fairchild, Shea Fisher, Houston County, Blaine Larsen (Treehouse), Richie McDonald, Anthony Smith and Darryl Worley. BamaJam included Tracy Lawrence, Blackberry Smoke and Matt Kennon. Country Crossing included John Anderson, Aaron Tippin, Louise Mandrell, Lee Greenwood and Lorrie Morgan. Emrose signed Margaret Durante.

== R&J/DMP/Emrose ==
James Stroud announced on May 17, 2011 the launching of the Nashville-based R&J Records. The same executive team that ran Stroudavarious Records ran the new label. Besides R&J Records, there were two concurrent labels: DMP Records and Emrose Records.

R&J was "restructured" in April 2012, with Andy Gibson transferring to Curb Records and Maggie Rose (formerly known as Margaret Durante) moving to RPM Entertainment.

== Roster ==
R&J Records

- Alexa Carter
- Heartland
- Aaron Lewis
- LoCash Cowboys

DMP Records

- Andy Gibson
- Rob Lane

Emrose Records

- Margaret Durante
