= I Miss My Friend (song) =

Single by Darryl Worley

from the album I Miss My Friend
- B-side: "Sideways"
- Released: March 11, 2002
- Genre: Country
- Length: 4:02
- Label: DreamWorks Nashville
- Songwriters: Tom Shapiro; Mark Nesler; Tony Martin
- Producers: Frank Rogers, James Stroud

Darryl Worley singles chronology
"Sideways" (2001)	"I Miss My Friend" (2002)	"Family Tree" (2002)

"I Miss My Friend" is a song written by Tom Shapiro, Mark Nesler and Tony Martin, and recorded by American country music singer Darryl Worley. It was released in March 2002 the first single and title track from his album of the same name. The song became his first number one single on the Hot Country Singles & Tracks (now Hot Country Songs) chart. It also crossed over to pop radio, peaking at #28 on the Billboard Hot 100.

== Development and promotion ==
DreamWorks promoted the album in conjunction with long-distance telephone company MCI for monitored stations to give away "I Miss My Friend"-themed phone cards in on-air contests.

== Content ==
The song is a ballad to a lost significant other. In the verses, the narrator lists the details of his significant other that he misses such as her eyes, her long brown hair and her powerful kisses during love making, stating in the chorus that what he misses the most of all is her friendship.

It features accompaniment from piano, mandolin, and a string section throughout.

== Music video ==
The music video for the song was directed by Shaun Silva, and features Worley playing guitar, facing a woman who is sitting on a couch. The camera predominantly alternates between a full shot showing both subjects, a close-up of the singer's face and a top-down shot of Worley and the rear wall; occasional shots from over Worley's shoulder shows the woman's reactions between song phrases. The left wall (which the woman looks toward) is not shown until the outro: the woman stands, walks through Worley and reveals that her reactions during the song were due to a home movie playing on a television behind the singer. Worley then stands up and walks away, disappearing into white light.

== Critical reception ==
People magazine called the tune "a unique, thoughtful take on romantic remorse that demonstrates Worley's sensitive brand of country," and noted that "Although the singer didn't have a hand in composing that tune...his eye for smart material is evident."

== Chart performance ==
"I Miss My Friend" debuted at #51 on the Hot Country Songs chart dated March 23, 2002. Having charted for 32 weeks on that chart, it reached Number One on the country chart dated September 21, 2002, holding that position for one week.

Chart (2002)	Peak position
US Billboard Hot 100	28
US Hot Country Songs (Billboard)	1

=== Year-end charts ===
Chart (2002)	Position
US Country Songs (Billboard)	5
