= Wynn Varble =

American singer-songwriter

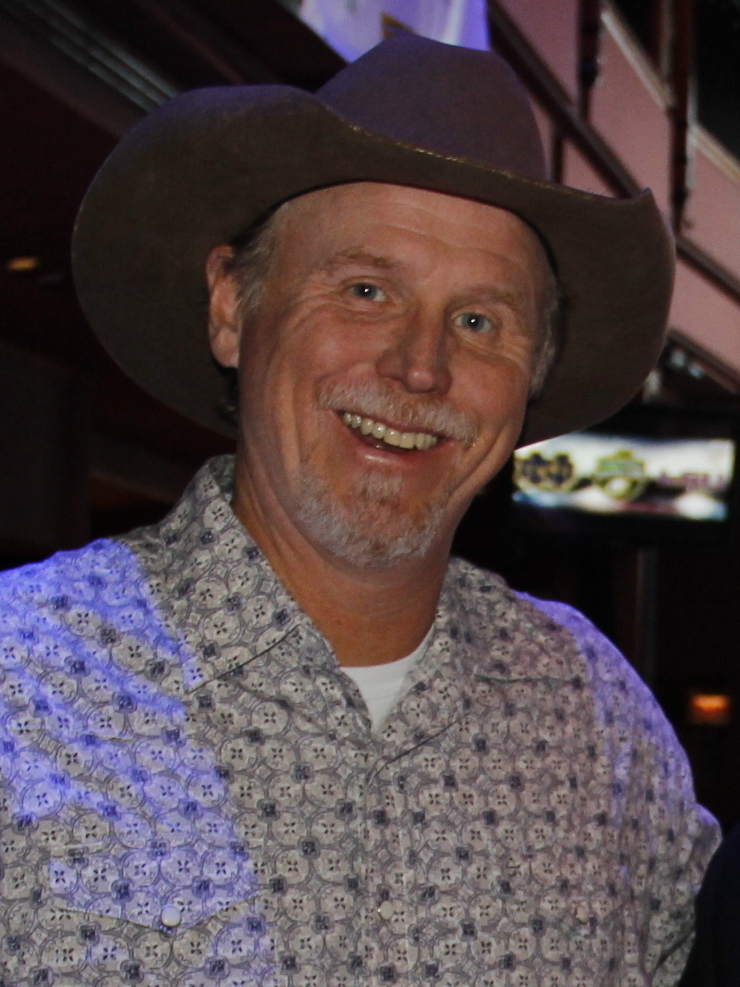
- Varble in 2014

Background information
- Born: George Edwin Varble; Ellenwood, Georgia
- Origin: Hampshire, Tennessee, U.S.
- Genres: Country
- Occupation: Singer-songwriter
- Instruments: Vocals, guitar
- Years active: 1982–present
- Label: Starstruck Writers Group Warner/Chappell
- Website: wynnvarble.com

George Edwin Varble is an American country music musician and songwriter. Varble co-wrote the hit songs Have You Forgotten?, Waitin' on a Woman, Things That Never Cross a Man's Mind and A Little More Country Than That.

In 2003, Varble co-wrote Have You Forgotten? with Darryl Worley, who released it as the first single from his album of the same name. It was No. 1 on Billboard's Hot Country Songs for seven weeks, and peaked at number 22 on the Billboard Hot 100.

Varble's song Waitin' on a Woman, co-written with Don Sampson, was recorded three times by American country music artist Brad Paisley. According to Country Weekly magazine, Varble received a call telling him that a former co-worker was in the hospital. Varble wrote the song after calling his co-worker at the hospital, wondering where his wife was. He told "the story and the idea [he] had for [the song]" to co-writer Don Sampson. After a few days, Varble and Sampson played "Waitin' on a Woman" for Paisley, and he decided to record it. Waitin' on a Woman debuted at number 51 on the Billboard Hot Country Songs chart dated for the week of June 28, 2008 and reached number 1 the week of September 20, 2008.

Varble wrote A Little More Country Than That with Rory Lee Feek and Don Poythress while the three were at a writing retreat held at Mickey Newbury's cabin near Nashville, Tennessee. The song was recorded by Easton Corbin and released in August 2009 as Corbin's debut single. The song peaked at Number One on the U.S. country singles charts dated for the week ending April 3, 2010, its thirty-second week on that chart.

In 2010 and 2011, Wynn was a contestant on CMT's Next Superstar.

== Personal life ==
Varble was raised in Ellenwood, Georgia. As of 2011, he lives in Hampshire, Tennessee, United States.

== Chart Singles Written by Wynn Varble ==
The following is a list of Wynn Varble compositions that were chart hits.

Year	Single Title	Recording Artist	Peak chart positions
Year	Single Title	Recording Artist	US Country
2000	When You Need My Love co-written with Darryl Worley	Darryl Worley	15
2003	Have You Forgotten? co-written with Darryl Worley	Darryl Worley	1
2006	I Just Came Back from a War co-written with Darryl Worley	Darryl Worley	15
2007	Things That Never Cross a Man's Mind co-written with Tim Johnson and Don Poythress	Kellie Pickler	16
2008	Waitin' on a Woman co-written with Don Sampson	Brad Paisley	1
2009	A Little More Country Than That co-written with Rory Lee Feek, and Don Poythress	Easton Corbin	1
2009	Sounds Like Life to Me co-written with Darryl Worley	Darryl Worley	11

== Songs written by ==
- "Self Made Man" - Montgomery Gentry (co-written with Jay Knowles)
- "Have You Forgotten?" – Darryl Worley (co-written with Worley)
- "Cadillac Tears" – Kevin Denney (cowritten with Leslie Satcher)
- "She Ain't In It" - Jon Pardi (co-written with Clint Daniels)
- "Things That Never Cross a Man's Mind" - Kellie Pickler (co-written with Tim Johnson and Don Poythress)
- "Waitin' on a Woman" – Brad Paisley (co-written with Don Sampson)
- "A Little More Country Than That" – Easton Corbin (co-written with Feek and Poythress)
- "Sounds Like Life To Me" – Darryl Worley (co-written with Worley)
- "Mom" – Bonnie Tyler, Garth Brooks (co-written with Don Sampson)

== Discography ==
=== Studio albums ===
Title	Album details
Badly Bent	Release date: 2003; Label: Self-released; Formats: CD
The Only Honky in This Honkytonk	Release date: April 6, 2011; Label: Self-released; Formats: CD, music download
Freak Show	Release date: April 9, 2013; Label: Steele Mansion Records; Formats: CD, music download

=== Music videos ===
Year	Video	Director
2011	"Baby's Got Her Buzz On"	Bryan Allen/Rory Lee Feek/Deaton-Flanigen
