= Darryl Worley =

American singer-songwriter

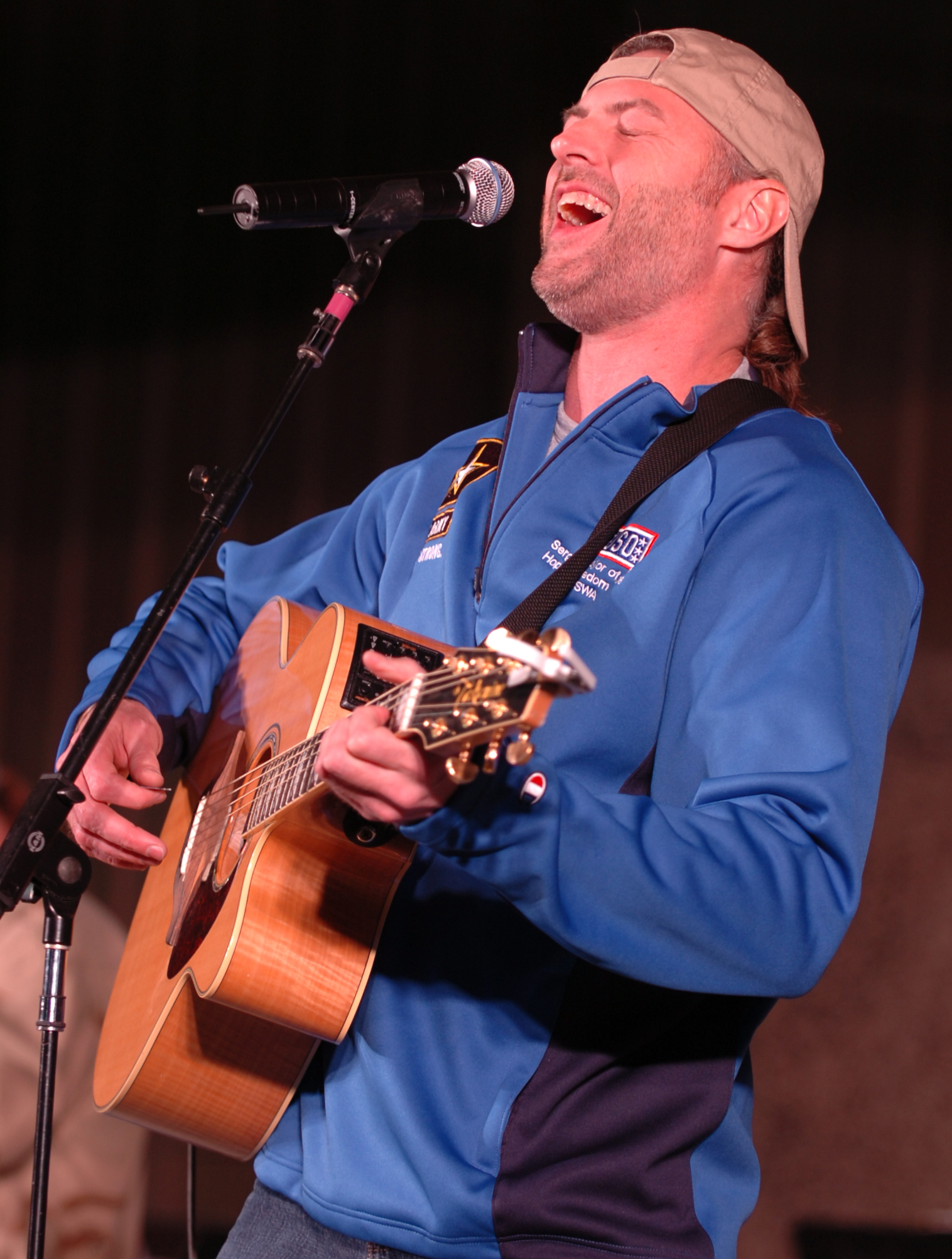
- Worley performing in 2006

Background information
- Born: Darryl Wade Worley; October 31, 1964 (age 61); Memphis, Tennessee, U.S.
- Origin: Pyburn, Tennessee, U.S.
- Genres: Country
- Occupations: Singer; songwriter
- Instruments: Vocals; acoustic guitar
- Years active: 1999–present
- Labels: DreamWorks; 903 Music; Stroudavarious; Tenacity
- Website: darrylworley.com

Darryl Wade Worley (born October 31, 1964) is an American country music singer and songwriter. Signed to DreamWorks Records Nashville in 1999, Worley released four albums for the label: Hard Rain Don't Last (2000), I Miss My Friend (2002), Have You Forgotten? (2003), and Darryl Worley in 2004. After the label closed in 2005, he moved to 903 Music, an independent label owned by Neal McCoy, releasing Here and Now in 2006, shortly before that label's closure. His most recent studio release is 2009's Sounds Like Life via Stroudavarious Records, owned by James Stroud.

Worley's six albums have produced 18 singles on the Billboard Hot Country Songs charts, including three number ones: "I Miss My Friend", "Have You Forgotten?", and "Awful, Beautiful Life", from 2002, 2003 and 2004–2005, respectively. "Have You Forgotten?" spent seven weeks at number one. Nine other singles have reached the top 40.

== Biography ==
Darryl Wade Worley was born October 31, 1964, in Memphis, Tennessee, to Tommy and Bonnie Worley. His family moved to Pyburn, Tennessee, when he was young and he was raised there. His father was a Methodist preacher and his mother sang in the church choir. Worley attended the University of North Alabama and earned a degree in biology and chemistry. He worked in the chemical industry prior to pursuing country music, and wrote for FAME Studios in Muscle Shoals, Alabama. One of his first cuts as a songwriter was a track on Archer/Park's 1994 debut album.

== Musical career ==
=== Hard Rain Don't Last (1999–2001) ===
Worley was signed to DreamWorks Records in 1999. His debut single "When You Need My Love" followed in March 2000, the first of four single releases from his debut album Hard Rain Don't Last. Following this song were "A Good Day to Run", "Second Wind" and "Sideways". Respectively, these singles peaked at No. 15, No. 12, No. 20 and No. 41 on the Billboard country charts. Production duties on the album were split between Frank Rogers and James Stroud. Also in 2000, George Jones charted with the single "Sinners & Saints", which Worley co-wrote.

=== I Miss My Friend (2002) ===
His second album, I Miss My Friend became his first Number One hit on the country charts that year, and was followed by the top 30 "Family Tree", written by Darrell & Scott. This album was also his first Number One album on Top Country Albums.

=== Have You Forgotten? (2003) ===
Worley had his biggest hit in 2003 with the 9/11 tribute ballad "Have You Forgotten?", the first release from his 2003 compilation album of the same name. It reached Number One in its fifth week on the charts, and held its position for seven weeks. The album included only four new tracks counting "Have You Forgotten?", as well as six each from his first and second albums. "Tennessee River Run", one of the carryovers from I Miss My Friend, was issued as a single in 2003, peaking at No. 31. After it came his lowest-peaking single, "I Will Hold My Ground" at No. 57. Have You Forgotten? is also certified gold by the RIAA.

=== Darryl Worley (2004–2005) ===
2004 saw the release of Worley's third studio album, the self-titled Darryl Worley. Its lead-off single, the Harley Allen co-write "Awful, Beautiful Life", became his third Number One hit in early 2005. Following this song was the Top Ten "If Something Should Happen", as well as "I Love Her, She Hates Me", which stopped at No. 56 due to the closure of DreamWorks Records in mid-2005.

=== Here and Now (2006–2007) ===
Later that same year, Worley signed with country singer Neal McCoy's vanity label 903 Music. His first release for 903 was "Nothin' but a Love Thang", which peaked at No. 35. This was the first of three singles from Here and Now, his fourth studio album. Also released from it were the Top 20 "I Just Came Back from a War" and the No. 54 "Livin' in the Here and Now", the chart run of which was halted by the closure of 903 music in May 2007.

=== Sounds Like Life (2008–2010) ===
Worley signed in 2008 to his third recording contract, this time with Stroudavarious Records, a label that Stroud founded in 2008. His sixteenth chart entry, "Tequila on Ice", was issued in the middle of that year, peaking at No. 44. Following it was "Sounds Like Life to Me", which has reached the Top 20. Both songs are included on his fifth release, Sounds Like Life. The album's third and final single was "Best of Both Worlds."

=== God & Country ===
Worley debuted the single "Keep the Change" in mid-2010. It was to be included on his sixth studio album, God & Country, but the album went unreleased when his record label, Stroudavarious, ceased operation.

Worley then moved to Tenacity Records in 2012 to release "You Still Got It".

== Personal life ==
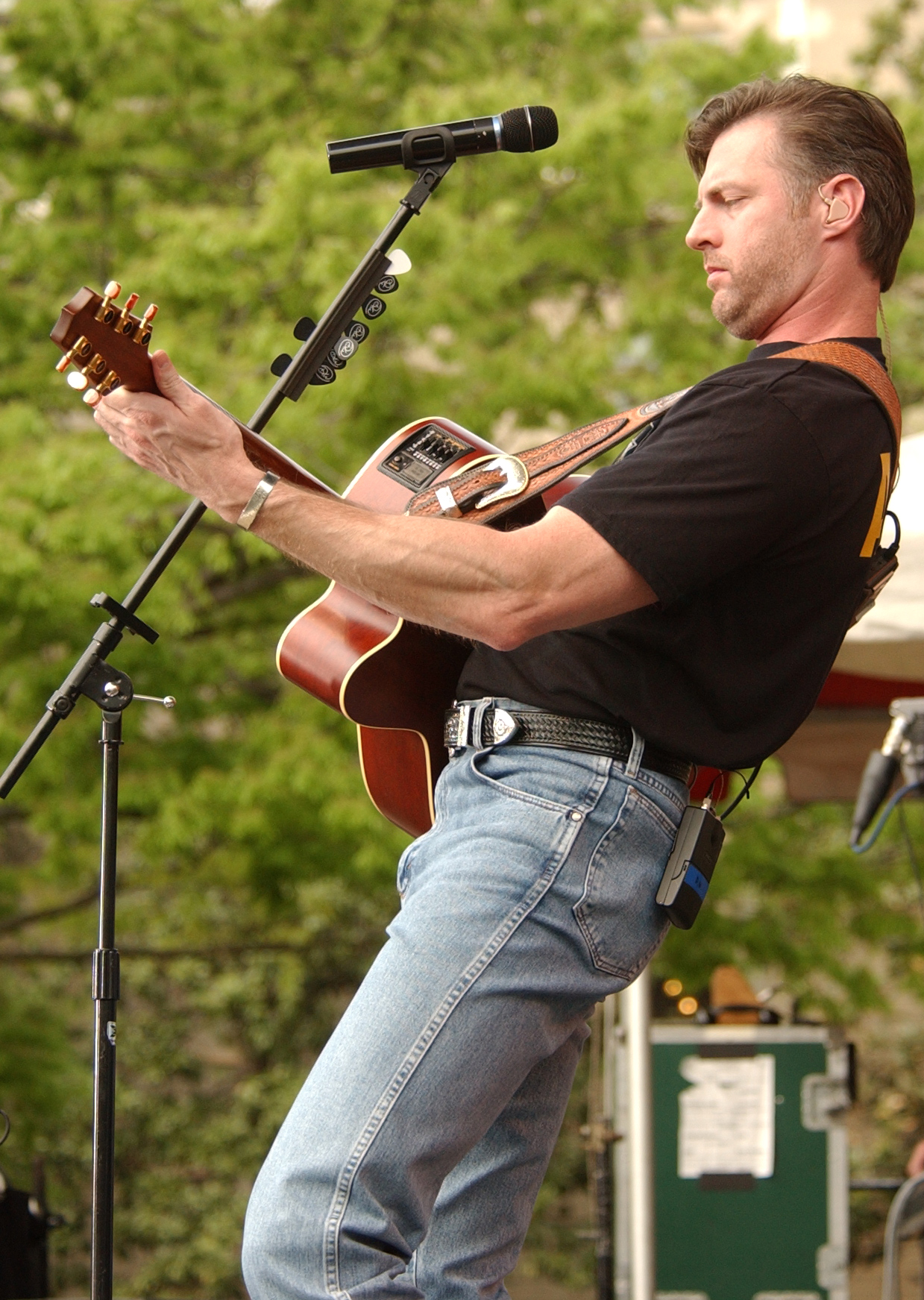
Darryl Worley performing for the troops at the Pentagon, April 2003

Worley married his first wife, Beverly Irwin, on May 12, 2001; they divorced in July 2006. Worley opened a restaurant, the Worleybird Cafe, in Savannah, TN, with his first wife. He also has two brothers, Tommy and Barry. Worley has been married since December 2007 to Kimberly Lee Perkins, with whom he has a daughter. Worley also formerly owned a boutique furniture store in Enterprise, Alabama.

In addition, Worley posed nude (non-full frontal) for the July 2007 issue of Playgirl magazine.

== Charitable works ==
Each year, Worley hosts a Charity Foundation Event, which is called the "Tennessee River Run." Proceeds benefit the Darryl Worley Foundation, a not-for-profit organization that provides funds to St. Jude Children's Research Hospital, Le Bonheur Children's Medical Center and the Cystic Fibrosis Foundation. His foundation also funded and helps maintain the Darryl Worley Cancer Treatment Center in his hometown of Savannah, Tennessee and helps area families in need through a grant process.

== Discography ==
Studio albums

- Hard Rain Don't Last (2000)
- I Miss My Friend (2002)
- Darryl Worley (2004)
- Here and Now (2006)
- Sounds Like Life (2009)

Compilation albums

- Have You Forgotten? (2003)

== Awards and nominations ==
=== Academy of Country Music Awards ===
Year	Nominee / work	Award	Result
2003	Darryl Worley	Top New Male Vocalist	Nominated

=== Country Music Association Awards ===
Year	Nominee / work	Award	Result
2002	Darryl Worley	Horizon Award	Nominated
2003	Darryl Worley	Horizon Award	Nominated
2003	"Have You Forgotten?"	Single of the Year	Nominated
2003	"Have You Forgotten?"	Song of the Year	Nominated
