= Diamond Rio discography =

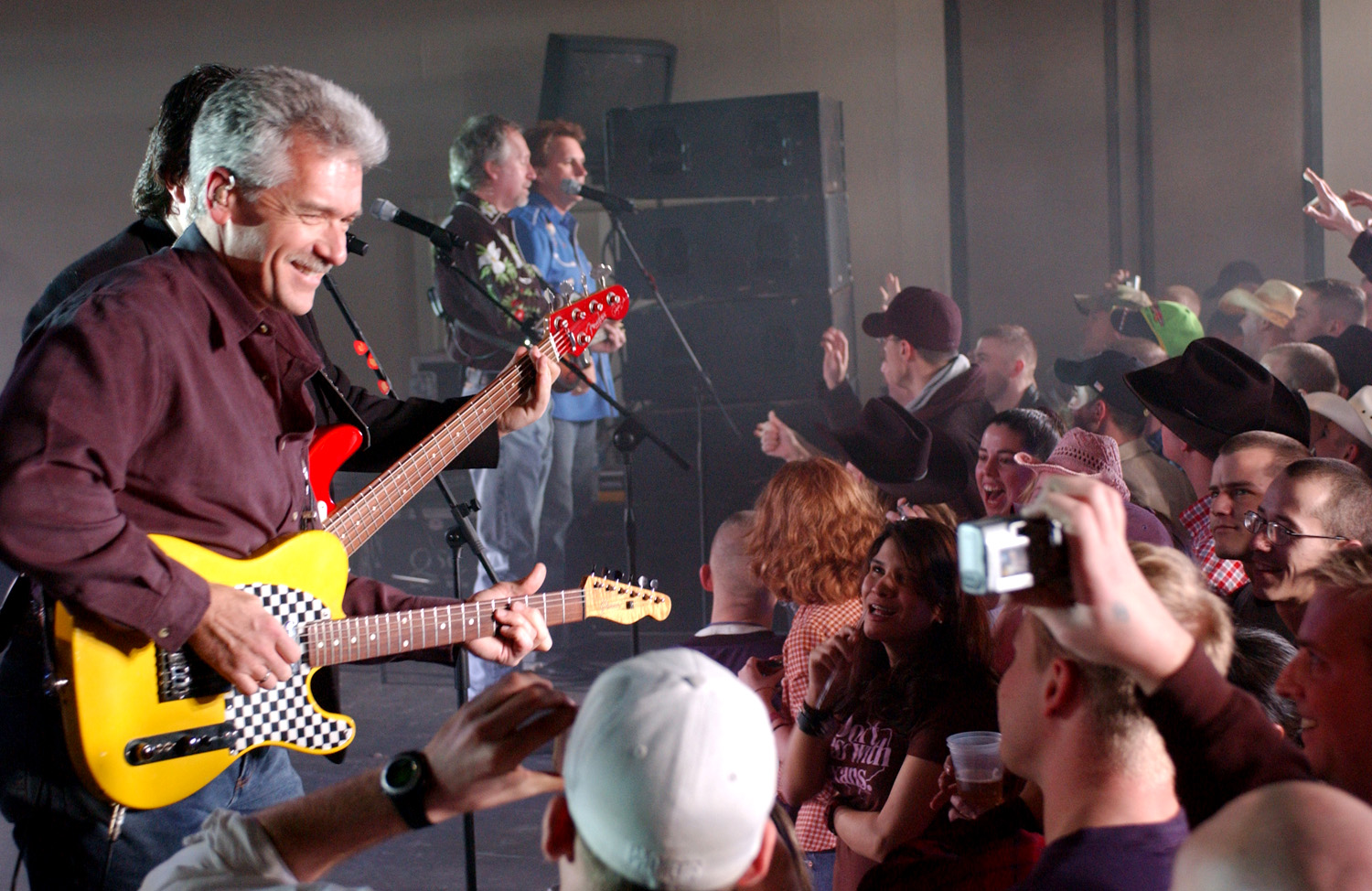
- Diamond Rio performing live for service members of 8th Fighter Wing Airmen in February 2006
- Studio albums: 10
- Live albums: 1
- Compilation albums: 6
- Singles: 36
- Music videos: 20
- Other appearances: 9

Diamond Rio is an American country music band founded in 1982. Their discography consists of 10 studio albums, 36 singles, six compilation albums, one live album, and 20 music videos. Founded in 1984, Diamond Rio released their self-titled debut album in 1991. "Meet in the Middle", the lead-off single, reached number one on the Billboard country singles chart, making the band the first country group in history to have their debut single reach that position.

Diamond Rio charted four additional number one hits: "How Your Love Makes Me Feel" (1997), "One More Day" (2001), "Beautiful Mess" (2002), and "I Believe" (2003). The latter three charted in the Top 40 on the Billboard Hot 100, as did 1999's "Unbelievable", which was a number two on the country chart. Besides their five number one hits, 14 more charted in the Top 10 on the country format, while "One More Day" was also a Top 10 on the Adult Contemporary chart.

Diamond Rio has also recorded ten studio albums, counting a Christmas release. Two of their studio albums (their 1991 self-titled debut and 1994's Love a Little Stronger) have been certified platinum by the Recording Industry Association of America (RIAA), and five have been certified gold. They have also issued two greatest hits packages, of which the first (1997's Greatest Hits) was certified platinum.

== Studio albums ==
=== 1990s ===
Title	Details	Peak positions			Certifications
Title	Details	US Country	US	CAN Country	Certifications
Diamond Rio	Release date: May 28, 1991; Label: Arista Nashville; Formats: CD, cassette	13	83	—	US: Platinum
Close to the Edge	Release date: October 27, 1992; Label: Arista Nashville; Formats: CD, cassette	24	87	—	US: Gold
Love a Little Stronger	Release date: July 19, 1994; Label: Arista Nashville; Formats: CD, cassette	13	100	7	US: Platinum
IV	Release date: February 27, 1996; Label: Arista Nashville; Formats: CD, cassette	14	92	4	US: Gold
Unbelievable	Release date: July 28, 1998; Label: Arista Nashville; Formats: CD, cassette	9	70	2	US: Gold
"—" denotes releases that did not chart

=== 2000s–2010s ===
Title	Details	Peak positions			Certifications
Title	Details	US Country	US	US Christ	Certifications
One More Day	Release date: February 6, 2001; Label: Arista Nashville; Formats: CD	5	36	—	US: Gold
Completely	Release date: July 23, 2002; Label: Arista Nashville; Formats: CD	3	23	—	US: Gold
A Diamond Rio Christmas: The Star Still Shines (Note: A Diamond Rio Christmas also peaked at number 18 on Top Holiday Albums.)	Release date: October 9, 2007; Label: Word Records; Formats: CD, download	56	—	28	
The Reason	Release date: September 22, 2009; Label: Word Records; Formats: CD, download	41	—	17	
I Made It	Release date: September 18, 2015; Label: Rio Hot Records; Formats: CD, download	—	—	—	
"—" denotes releases that did not chart

== Compilation albums ==
Title	Details	Peak positions			Certifications
Title	Details	US Country	US	GER	Certifications
Greatest Hits	Release date; August 9, 1997; Label: Arista Nashville; Formats: CD, cassette	8	75	60	US: Platinum
Super Hits	Release date: 1999; Label: Arista Nashville; Formats: CD, cassette	—	—	—	
All American Country	Release date: 2003; Label: BMG Special Products; Formats: CD, cassette	—	—	—	
Greatest Hits II	Release date: June 17, 2006; Label: Arista Nashville; Formats: CD, download	12	62	—	
16 Biggest Hits	Release date: February 23, 2008; Label: Arista Nashville / Legacy; Formats: CD, download	63	—	—	
Playlist: The Very Best of Diamond Rio	Release date: October 21, 2008; Label: Arista Nashville / Legacy; Formats: CD, download	—	—	—	
"—" denotes releases that did not chart

== Live albums ==
Title	Details
Diamond Rio Live	Release date: November 18, 2014; Label: Rio Hot Records; Formats: CD, DVD, download

== Singles ==
=== 1990s ===
Year	Single	Peak positions			Certifications	Album
Year	Single	US Country	US	CAN Country	Certifications	Album
1991	"Meet in the Middle"	1	—	1	US: 2× Platinum	Diamond Rio
1991	"Mirror, Mirror"	3	—	4		Diamond Rio
1991	"Mama Don't Forget to Pray for Me"	9	—	9		Diamond Rio
1992	"Norma Jean Riley"	2	—	3		Diamond Rio
1992	"Nowhere Bound"	7	—	15		Diamond Rio
1992	"In a Week or Two"	2	—	3		Close to the Edge
1993	"Oh Me, Oh My, Sweet Baby"	5	—	8		Close to the Edge
1993	"This Romeo Ain't Got Julie Yet"	13	—	5		Close to the Edge
1993	"Sawmill Road"	21	—	20		Close to the Edge
1994	"Love a Little Stronger"	2	—	6		Love a Little Stronger
1994	"Night Is Fallin' in My Heart"	9	— (Note: "Night Is Fallin' in My Heart" did not enter the Hot 100, but peaked at number seven on Bubbling Under Hot 100 Singles.)	6		Love a Little Stronger
1995	"Bubba Hyde"	16	— (Note: "Bubba Hyde" did not enter the Hot 100, but peaked at number two on Bubbling Under Hot 100 Singles.)	12		Love a Little Stronger
1995	"Finish What We Started"	19	—	23		Love a Little Stronger
1995	"Walkin' Away"	2	—	2		IV
1996	"That's What I Get for Lovin' You"	4	—	19		IV
1996	"It's All in Your Head"	15	—	17		IV
1996	"Holdin'"	4	—	5		IV
1997	"How Your Love Makes Me Feel"	1	—	1		Greatest Hits
1997	"Imagine That"	4	—	4		Greatest Hits
1998	"You're Gone"	4	—	5		Unbelievable
1998	"Unbelievable"	2	36	1		Unbelievable
1999	"I Know How the River Feels"	33	—	28		Unbelievable
"—" denotes releases that did not chart

=== 2000s–2020s ===
Year	Single	Peak positions				Certifications	Album
Year	Single	US Country	US	US AC	CAN Country	Certifications	Album
2000	"Stuff"	36	—	—	40		One More Day
2000	"One More Day"	1	29	6	*	US: Platinum	One More Day
2001	"Sweet Summer"	18	— (Note: "Sweet Summer" did not enter the Hot 100, but peaked at number four on Bubbling Under Hot 100 Singles.)	—	*		One More Day
2001	"That's Just That"	42	—	—	*		One More Day
2002	"Beautiful Mess"	1	28	—	*	US: Platinum	Completely
2002	"I Believe"	1	31	—	*		Completely
2003	"Wrinkles"	16	— (Note: "Wrinkles" did not enter the Hot 100, but peaked at number seven on Bubbling Under Hot 100 Singles.)	—	*		Completely
2004	"We All Fall Down"	45	—	—	—		Completely
2004	"Can't You Tell"	43	—	—	—		Can't You Tell (unreleased)
2005	"One Believer"	42	—	—	—		Can't You Tell (unreleased)
2006	"God Only Cries"	30	—	—	—		Greatest Hits II
2009	"God Is There"	—	—	—	—		The Reason
2010	"This Is My Life"	—	—	—	—		The Reason
2023	"The Kick"	—	—	—	—		Non-album single
"—" denotes releases that did not chart "*" denotes releases where no chart existed

=== As a featured artist ===
Year	Single	Peak positions	Album
Year	Single	US Country	Album
1994	"Workin' Man's Blues" (as Jed Zeppelin) (Note: Jed Zeppelin was an all-star group consisting of Diamond Rio, Lee Roy Parnell and Steve Wariner.)	48	Mama's Hungry Eyes: A Tribute to Merle Haggard

== Music videos ==
Year	Title	Director
1991	"Meet in the Middle"	Eric Straton
1991	"Mirror, Mirror"	Michael Merriman
1992	"Mama Don't Forget to Pray for Me"	Michael Merriman
1992	"Nowhere Bound"	Michael Merriman
1993	"In a Week or Two"	John Lloyd Miller
1993	"This Romeo Ain't Got Julie Yet"	Deaton-Flanigen
1994	"Love a Little Stronger"	Deaton-Flanigen
1994	"Workin' Man's Blues" (as Jed Zeppelin)	Deaton-Flanigen
1995	"Bubba Hyde"	Deaton-Flanigen
1995	"Finish What We Started"	Deaton-Flanigen
1996	"Walkin' Away"	Deaton-Flanigen
1996	"It's All in Your Head"	Deaton-Flanigen
1997	"How Your Love Makes Me Feel"	Deaton-Flanigen
1998	"You're Gone"	Peter Zavadil
1999	"Unbelievable"	Deaton-Flanigen
2000	"Stuff"	Deaton-Flanigen
2001	"One More Day"	Deaton-Flanigen
2002	"Beautiful Mess"	Deaton-Flanigen
2003	"I Believe"	Deaton-Flanigen
2006	"God Only Cries"	Traci Goudie
2006	"In God We Still Trust"	

== Other appearances ==
Year	Song	Album
1993	"Lyin' Eyes"	Common Thread: The Songs of the Eagles
1994	"Ten Feet Away"	Keith Whitley: A Tribute Album
1994	"Workin' Man Blues" (as Jed Zeppelin)	Mama's Hungry Eyes: A Tribute to Merle Haggard
1996	"Beauty and the Beast"	The Best of Country Sing the Best of Disney
1996	"Christmas Spirit"	Star of Wonder: A Country Christmas Collection
1997	"Walkin' in Jerusalem"	Peace in the Valley: A Country Music Journey Through Gospel Music
2000	"He Will, She Knows" (with Kenny Rogers and Collin Raye)	There You Go Again
2002	"Man of Constant Borrow" (with Cledus T. Judd)	Cledus Envy
2017	"I Ain't All There" (with Jerrod Niemann)	This Ride
