= 16 Biggest Hits (Diamond Rio album) =

Greatest hits album by Diamond Rio
- Released: February 23, 2008
- Genre: Country
- Length: 54:48
- Label: Arista Nashville
- Producer: Various

Diamond Rio chronology
A Diamond Rio Christmas: The Star Still Shines (2007)	16 Biggest Hits (2008)	The Reason (2009)

Professional ratings
Review scores
Source	Rating
Allmusic	3.5/5 stars

16 Biggest Hits is a compilation album from the country music band Diamond Rio. It was released on February 23, 2008 by Arista Nashville after the group left the label.

== Track listing ==
No.	Title	Writer(s)	Length
1.	"How Your Love Makes Me Feel"	Trey Bruce, Max T. Barnes	4:05
2.	"Walkin' Away"	Craig Wiseman, Annie Roboff	3:51
3.	"Holdin'"	Kelly Garrett, Wiseman	3:12
4.	"Meet in the Middle"	Chapin Hartford, Jim Foster, Don Pfrimmer	3:19
5.	"Unbelievable"	Al Anderson, Jeffrey Steele	2:22
6.	"Beautiful Mess"	Sonny LeMaire, Shane Minor, Clay Mills	3:48
7.	"One More Day"	Bobby Tomberlin, Steven Dale Jones	3:37
8.	"Love a Little Stronger"	Billy Crittenden, Chuck Jones, Gregory Swint	3:41
9.	"Oh Me, Oh My, Sweet Baby"	Michael Garvin, Tom Shapiro	3:15
10.	"Mirror, Mirror"	Bob DiPiero, Mark D. Sanders, John Jarrard	3:12
11.	"You're Gone"	Paul Williams, Jon Vezner	4:00
12.	"Nowhere Bound"	Monty Powell, Jule Medders	3:42
13.	"Norma Jean Riley"	Powell, Dan Truman, Rob Honey	3:05
14.	"In a Week or Two"	James House, Gary Burr	2:59
15.	"I Believe"	Skip Ewing, Donny Kees	3:57
16.	"This Romeo Ain't Got Julie Yet"	Jimmy Olander, Eric Silver	2:43

== Chart performance ==
16 Biggest Hits peaked at #63 on the U.S. Billboard Top Country Albums chart the week of August 25, 2007.

Chart (2007)	Peak position
U.S. Billboard Top Country Albums	63

== Personnel ==
- Gene Johnson – mandolin, tenor vocals
- Jimmy Olander – acoustic guitar, electric guitar, banjo
- Brian Prout – drums
- Marty Roe – lead vocals, acoustic guitar
- Dan Truman – keyboards, piano, organ
- Dana Williams – bass guitar, baritone vocals
