= Greatest Hits (Diamond Rio album) =

Greatest hits album by Diamond Rio
- Released: July 15, 1997
- Genre: Country
- Length: 49:15
- Label: Arista Nashville
- Producer: Michael Clute, Diamond Rio

Diamond Rio chronology
IV (1996)	Greatest Hits (1997)	Unbelievable (1998)

Singles from Greatest Hits
- 1. "How Your Love Makes Me Feel" Released: May 26, 1997; 2. "Imagine That" Released: November 3, 1997

Professional ratings
Review scores
Source	Rating
AllMusic	link

Greatest Hits is the first compilation album by American country music band Diamond Rio. The tracks "How Your Love Makes Me Feel" and "Imagine That" are new to this compilation, and both were released as singles. All of the other tracks from this album are reprised from the band's first four albums.

== Track listing ==
No.	Title	Writer(s)	Length
1.	"How Your Love Makes Me Feel"	Trey Bruce, Max T. Barnes	4:04
2.	"Meet in the Middle"	Chapin Hartford, Jim Foster, Don Pfrimmer	3:19
3.	"Mirror, Mirror"	Bob DiPiero, Mark D. Sanders, John Jarrard	3:11
4.	"Mama Don't Forget to Pray for Me"	Larry Cordle, Larry Shell	4:11
5.	"Norma Jean Riley"	Monty Powell, Dan Truman, Rob Honey	3:03
6.	"In a Week or Two"	James House, Gary Burr	2:59
7.	"Love a Little Stronger"	Billy Crittenden, Chuck Jones, Gregory Swint	3:40
8.	"Night Is Fallin' in My Heart"	Dennis Linde	3:29
9.	"Bubba Hyde"	Craig Wiseman, Gene Nelson	3:44
10.	"Walkin' Away"	Wiseman, Annie Roboff	3:50
11.	"It's All in Your Head"	Van Stephenson, Reese Wilson, Tony Martin	3:39
12.	"Holdin'"	Kelly Garrett, Wiseman	3:11
13.	"She Misses Him on Sunday the Most"	Steven Dale Jones, Bobby Tomberlin	3:29
14.	"Imagine That"	Bryan White, Derek George, John Tirro	3:29

== Personnel ==
- Gene Johnson – mandolin, background vocals
- Jimmy Olander – acoustic guitar, electric guitar
- Brian Prout – drums
- Marty Roe – acoustic guitar, lead vocals
- Dan Truman – keyboards
- Dana Williams – bass guitar, background vocals

== Charts ==
=== Weekly charts ===
Chart (1997)	Peak position
US Billboard 200	75
US Top Country Albums (Billboard)	8

=== Year-end charts ===
Chart (1997)	Position
US Top Country Albums (Billboard)	60
Chart (1998)	Position
US Top Country Albums (Billboard)	57

== Certifications ==
Certifications for Greatest Hits
Region	Certification	Certified units/sales
United States (RIAA)	Platinum	1,000,000^{^}
^{^} Shipments figures based on certification alone.
