= Greatest Hits II (Diamond Rio album) =

Album by Diamond Rio

Greatest hits album by Diamond Rio
- Released: May 9, 2006
- Genre: Country
- Length: 47:01
- Label: Arista Nashville
- Producers: Michael Clute, Diamond Rio

Diamond Rio chronology
Completely (2002)	Greatest Hits II (2006)	A Diamond Rio Christmas: The Star Still Shines (2007)

Professional ratings
Review scores
Source	Rating
About.com	link
AllMusic	link

Greatest Hits II is the second compilation albun by American country music group Diamond Rio. The tracks "God Only Cries", "Redneck Love Gone Bad", "Over You" and "In God We Still Trust" were newly recorded for the album. "God Only Cries" was the only one of these to be released as a single; it peaked at number 30 on the Hot Country Songs charts in mid-2006, shortly before the band exited Arista's roster.

== Track listing ==
No.	Title	Writer(s)	Length
1.	"God Only Cries"	Tim Johnson	3:56
2.	"Beautiful Mess"	Sonny LeMaire, Shane Minor, Clay Mills	3:48
3.	"One More Day"	Bobby Tomberlin, Steven Dale Jones	3:35
4.	"Sweet Summer"	Neil Thrasher, Michael Dulaney	4:29
5.	"Redneck Love Gone Bad"	Bobby Taylor, Shannon Lawson	3:46
6.	"Over You"	Jason Sellers, Dulaney, Jones	3:41
7.	"Unbelievable"	Al Anderson, Jeffrey Steele	2:21
8.	"You're Gone"	Paul Williams, Jon Vezner	3:59
9.	"That's What I Get for Lovin' You"	Thrasher, Kent Blazy	3:17
10.	"Wrinkles"	Thrasher, Ronny Scaife	3:08
11.	"I Believe"	Skip Ewing, Donny Kees	3:57
12.	"Meet in the Middle"	Jim Foster, Chapin Hartford, Don Pfrimmer	3:20
13.	"In God We Still Trust"	Rob LeClair, Bill Nash, Kim Nash	3:36

== Personnel ==
- Gene Johnson – mandolin, background vocals
- Jimmy Olander – acoustic guitar, electric guitar, banjo
- Brian Prout – drums
- Marty Roe – acoustic guitar, lead vocals
- Dan Truman – keyboards
- Dana Williams – bass guitar, background vocals

== Charts ==
=== Weekly charts ===
Chart (2006)	Peak position
US Billboard 200	62
US Top Country Albums (Billboard)	12

=== Year-end charts ===
Chart (2006)	Position
US Top Country Albums (Billboard)	69
