= I Made It =

I Made It may refer to:

- "I Made It (Cash Money Heroes)", a 2010 song by Kevin Rudolf
- "I Made It" (Fantasia song), 2016
- I Made It, a 2015 album by Diamond Rio

== See also ==
- We Made It (disambiguation)
