= Imagine That =

Imagine That may refer to:

- Imagine That (film), a 2009 fantasy comedy starring Eddie Murphy
- "Imagine That" (Diamond Rio song), from their 1997 album Greatest Hits
- "Imagine That" (LL Cool J song), from his 2000 album G.O.A.T.
- "Imagine That" (Patsy Cline song), a 1962 country/pop song written for Patsy Cline
- Imagine That (TV series), a 2002 TV series
- "If I Ruled the World (Imagine That)", a song by Nas from his 1996 album It Was Written
- "Imagine That," a song by Ani Difranco from her 2001 album Revelling/Reckoning
- "Imagine That," a song by R. Kelly from his 2003 album Chocolate Factory
- Imagine That!, a 1971 children's TV special starring Dora Hall
- Imagine That, 2002 TV series starring Hank Azaria
- "Imagine That" (Rugrats episode), a 2003 episode of the animated television series The Rugrats
- Imagine That!, an episode of Barney & Friends
- Imagine That, a song from Sesame Street sung by Ernie
- Imagine That, a song from Bear in the Big Blue House
- Rhys Darby Live - Imagine That! a 2008 live comedy show DVD starring Rhys Darby of Flight of the Conchords fame
