= Sawmill Road =

Single by Diamond Rio

from the album Close to the Edge
- B-side: "I Was Meant to Be with You"
- Released: November 27, 1993
- Length: 4:49
- Label: Arista
- Songwriters: Dan Truman, Sam Hogin, Jim McBride
- Producers: Monty Powell, Tim DuBois

Diamond Rio singles chronology
"This Romeo Ain't Got Julie Yet" (1993)	"Sawmill Road" (1993)	"Love a Little Stronger" (1994)

"Sawmill Road" is a song written by Dan Truman, Sam Hogin and Jim McBride, and recorded by American country music group Diamond Rio. It was released in November 1993 as the fourth and final single from the album Close to the Edge. The song reached #21 on the Billboard Hot Country Singles & Tracks chart.

== Chart performance ==
Chart (1993–1994)	Peak position
Canada Country Singles (RPM)	20
US Hot Country Songs (Billboard)	21
