= Norma Jean =

Norma Jean may refer to:

- Norma Jean (band), a metalcore band from Douglasville, Georgia, U.S.
- Norma Jean (singer) (born 1938), American country music singer
- Norma Jean (album), a 1978 album by Norma Jean Wright

== People with the given names ==
- Jeanne Pruett or Norma Jean Bowman (born 1937), American country music singer
- Norma Jeane Mortenson or Marilyn Monroe, actress
- Norma Jean Speranza or Jill Corey (1935–2021), singer
- Norma Jean Wright, R&B vocalist and former lead singer of Chic

== See also ==
- Norma Jeane
- "Norma Jean Riley", a 1992 single by Diamond Rio from Diamond Rio
