= Love a Little Stronger =

Love A Little Stronger

Studio album by Diamond Rio
- Released: July 19, 1994
- Recorded: Midtown Tone & Volume and Masterfonics (Nashville, Tennessee)
- Genre: Country
- Length: 33:58
- Label: Arista
- Producers: Mike Clute Tim DuBois Monty Powell

Diamond Rio chronology
Close to the Edge (1993)	Love A Little Stronger (1994)	IV (1996)

Singles from Love a Little Stronger
- 1. "Love a Little Stronger" Released: May 9, 1994; 2. "Night Is Fallin' in My Heart" Released: October 4, 1994; 3. "Bubba Hyde" Released: February 4, 1995; 4. "Finish What We Started" Released: May 1995

Professional ratings
Review scores
Source	Rating
AllMusic	3/5 stars
Entertainment Weekly	B−

Love a Little Stronger is the third studio album by American country music band Diamond Rio. Released in 1994 on Arista Records, the album was certified platinum by the RIAA for sales of one million copies in the U.S. Four singles were released from the album: the title track, followed by "Night Is Fallin' in My Heart", "Bubba Hyde", and finally "Finish What We Started". Respectively, these songs reached #2, #9, #16 and #19 on the Billboard Hot Country Songs charts. A demo version of the song, recorded by 4 Runner in 1994, can be found on 4 Runner's 2003 album Getaway Car. Former 4 Runner vocalist Billy Crittenden co-wrote the song. Originally, Diamond Rio were going to include an Eagles cover of "Lyin' Eyes" on this album but the producer Tim DuBois rejected the idea because he felt that they were not yet well-established enough to record a cover song on one of their own studio albums.

== Track listing ==
No.	Title	Writer(s)	Length
1.	"Love a Little Stronger"	Chuck Jones, Billy Crittenden, Gregory Swint	3:40
2.	"You Ain't in It"	Tim Mensy, Shawn Camp	2:52
3.	"Finish What We Started"	Monty Powell, Michael Noble	3:18
4.	"Night Is Fallin' in My Heart"	Dennis Linde	3:30
5.	"Down by the Riverside"	Powell, Marty Roe, Jule Medders	3:40
6.	"Wild Blue Yonder"	Karen Taylor-Good, Lisa Aschmann	2:54
7.	"Bubba Hyde"	Craig Wiseman, Gene Nelson	3:44
8.	"Gone Out of My Mind"	Gene Dobbins, Michael Huffman, Bob Morrison	2:59
9.	"Appalachian Dream" (instrumental track)	Jimmy Olander	2:27
10.	"Kentucky Mine"	Powell, Jimmie Lee Sloas, Dale Oliver	4:54

== Personnel ==
Diamond Rio

- Marty Roe – lead vocals, acoustic guitar
- Dan Truman – keyboards
- Jimmy Olander – acoustic guitar, electric guitars, banjo
- Gene Johnson – mandolin, backing vocals
- Dana Williams – bass, backing vocals
- Brian Prout – drums

== Production ==
- Tim DuBois – producer
- Monty Powell – producer
- Mike Clute – associate producer, engineer, mixing
- Herb Tassin – engineer, assistant engineer
- Glenn Meadows – mastering at Masterfonics
- Charlee Padgett Wallace – production coordinator
- Maude Gilman – art direction
- S. Wade Hunt – design
- Jim "Señor" McGuire – photography
- Ted Hackett for International Artist Management – management

== Charts ==
=== Weekly charts ===
Chart (1994)	Peak position
Canadian Country Albums (RPM)	7
US Billboard 200	100
US Top Country Albums (Billboard)	13

=== Year-end charts ===
Chart (1995)	Position
US Top Country Albums (Billboard)	42

== Certifications ==
Certifications for Love a Little Stronger
Region	Certification	Certified units/sales
United States (RIAA)	Platinum	1,000,000^{^}
^{^} Shipments figures based on certification alone.
