= Unbelievable (Diamond Rio album) =

Studio album by Diamond Rio
- Released: July 28, 1998
- Studios: Midtown Tone & Volume, OmniSound Studios and Masterfonics (Nashville, Tennessee)
- Genre: Country
- Length: 35:12
- Label: Arista Nashville
- Producers: Mike Clute Diamond Rio

Diamond Rio chronology
Greatest Hits (1997)	Unbelievable (1998)	One More Day (2001)

Singles from Unbelievable
- 1. "You're Gone" Released: June 1, 1998; 2. "Unbelievable" Released: October 19, 1998; 3. "I Know How the River Feels" Released: March 29, 1999

Professional ratings
Review scores
Source	Rating
AllMusic	3/5 stars
Entertainment Weekly	B

Unbelievable is the fifth studio album by American country music group Diamond Rio. Its title track and "You're Gone" were both Top 5 hits on the country charts in 1998-1999, while "I Know How the River Feels" (originally cut by Ty Herndon on his Living in a Moment album) was a minor Top 40, and was later a #69 for the group McAlyster in 2000. "What More Do You Want From Me" was originally an uncharted single by Rhonda Vincent, released in 1995 and was also included on her album Trouble Free in 1996.

== Critical reception ==
Entertainment Weekly thought that the band "knows how to please with show-off musicianship and clever vocal harmonies ... but too often they call more attention to how hard they’re working than to what lies between the grooves."

== Track listing ==
No.	Title	Writer(s)	Length
1.	"Two Pump Texaco"	Neil Thrasher, Michael Dulaney	3:54
2.	"Miss That Girl"	Kenny Mims, Jeff Pennig	3:00
3.	"You're Gone"	Jon Vezner, Paul Williams	3:59
4.	"What More Do You Want from Me?"	Mark D. Sanders, Bob Regan	2:35
5.	"Unbelievable"	Al Anderson, Jeffrey Steele	2:21
6.	"Long Way Back"	Bill Rice, Sharon Vaughn	3:33
7.	"I Thought I'd Seen Everything"	Robert John "Mutt" Lange, Huey Lewis	3:58
8.	"Hold Me Now"	Tommy Sims, Gordon Kennedy	3:14
9.	"I Know How the River Feels"	Amy Powers, Steven Dale Jones	3:40
10.	"(I Will) Start All Over Again"	Will Jennings, Annie Roboff	4:49

== Personnel ==
Diamond Rio

- Marty Roe – lead vocals
- Dan Truman – keyboards, string arrangements (9)
- Jimmy Olander – acoustic guitars, electric guitars
- Gene Johnson – mandolin, harmony vocals
- Dana Williams – bass, harmony vocals
- Brian Prout – drums

Additional musicians

- Ron Saltmarsh – keyboard sound design
- Michael Wyatt – percussion
- Carl Marsh – string arrangements (9), string conductor (9)
- John Catchings – cello (9)
- Kathryn Plummer – viola (9)
- Kristin Wilkinson – viola (9)
- David Davidson – violin (9)

== Production ==
- Diamond Rio – producers
- Mike Clute – producer, engineer, mixing
- Pete Miskinis – assistant engineer
- Matt Svobodny – additional assistant engineer
- Glenn Meadows – mastering at Masterfonics
- Jennifer Rose – project coordinator
- Maude Gilman-Clapham – art direction
- S. Wade Hunt – design
- Fred C. Moran – cover artwork
- Jim "Señor" McGuire – photography
- Lori Turk – grooming
- Claudia Robertson-Fowler – stylist
- Barry Coburn for Ten Ten Management – management

== Charts ==
=== Weekly charts ===
Chart (1998)	Peak position
Canadian Country Albums (RPM)	2
US Billboard 200	70
US Top Country Albums (Billboard)	9

=== Year-end charts ===
Chart (1998)	Position
US Top Country Albums (Billboard)	45
Chart (1999)	Position
US Top Country Albums (Billboard)	25

== Certifications ==
Certifications for Unbelievable
Region	Certification	Certified units/sales
United States (RIAA)	Gold	500,000^{^}
^{^} Shipments figures based on certification alone.
