= Diamond Rio (album) =

Studio album by Diamond Rio
- Released: May 28, 1991
- Recorded: 1990–91
- Studios: Midtown Tone & Volume, Digital Studios, Recording Arts and Masterfonics (Nashville, Tennessee)
- Genre: Country
- Length: 38:47
- Label: Arista
- Producers: Tim DuBois; Monty Powell

Diamond Rio chronology
Diamond Rio (1991)	Close to the Edge (1992)

Singles from Diamond Rio
- 1. "Meet in the Middle" Released: February 11, 1991; 2. "Mirror, Mirror" Released: July 1, 1991; 3. "Mama Don't Forget to Pray for Me" Released: November 4, 1991; 4. "Norma Jean Riley" Released: March 23, 1992; 5. "Nowhere Bound" Released: June 29, 1992

Professional ratings
Review scores
Source	Rating
AllMusic	4.5/5 stars
Chicago Tribune	3/4 stars
Entertainment Weekly	B+

Diamond Rio is the self-titled debut studio album by American country music band Diamond Rio. Released in 1991 on Arista Records, it produced five chart singles on the Billboard country music charts: the Number One hit "Meet in the Middle", as well as the Top Ten hits "Mirror, Mirror", "Mama Don't Forget to Pray for Me", "Norma Jean Riley" and "Nowhere Bound". The album received a RIAA platinum certification.

== Track listing ==
No.	Title	Writer(s)	Length
1.	"Meet in the Middle"	Chapin Hartford, Jim Foster, Don Pfrimmer	3:18
2.	"This State of Mind"	Michael Puryear, Aaron Tippin	2:42
3.	"They Don't Make Hearts (Like They Used To)"	Monty Powell, Sam Mullins, Stan LaGrange	3:32
4.	"Mirror, Mirror"	Bob DiPiero, John Jarrard, Mark D. Sanders	3:12
5.	"The Ballad of Conley and Billy (The Proof's in the Pickin')"	Powell, Jimmy Olander	4:59
6.	"Nowhere Bound"	Powell, Jule Medders	3:41
7.	"It's Gone"	Herb McCullough, Larry Cordle	3:17
8.	"Norma Jean Riley"	Powell, Dan Truman, Rob Honey	3:03
9.	"Mama Don't Forget to Pray for Me"	Cordle, Larry Shell	4:12
10.	"Pick Me Up""	Powell, Marty Roe	3:25
11.	"Poultry Promenade" (instrumental track)	Olander	3:26

== Personnel ==
Diamond Rio

- Marty Roe – lead vocals, acoustic guitars
- Dan Truman – keyboards
- Jimmy Olander – lead guitars, banjo
- Gene Johnson – mandolin, backing vocals
- Dana Williams – bass, backing vocals
- Brian Prout – drums

== Production ==
- Tim DuBois – producer
- Monty Powell – producer
- Mike Clute – engineer, mixing
- Chris Armstrong – assistant engineer
- Ted Greene – assistant engineer
- Paula Montondo – assistant engineer
- Doug Williams – assistant engineer
- Glenn Meadows – mastering at Masterfonics
- Anthony Ranieri – art direction, design
- Peter Nash – photography
- David Fisher – logo design
- Gene Johnson – logo design
- Ted Hacker for International Artist Management – management

== Charts ==
=== Weekly charts ===
Chart (1991)	Peak position
US Billboard 200	83
US Top Country Albums (Billboard)	13

=== Year-end charts ===
Chart (1991)	Position
US Top Country Albums (Billboard)	36

=== Singles ===
Year	Single	Peak positions	
Year	Single	US Country	CAN Country
1991	"Meet in the Middle"	1	1
1991	"Mirror, Mirror"	3	4
1991	"Mama Don't Forget to Pray for Me"	9	9
1992	"Norma Jean Riley"	2	3
1992	"Nowhere Bound"	7	15

== Certifications ==
Certifications for Diamond Rio
Region	Certification	Certified units/sales
United States (RIAA)	Platinum	1,000,000^{^}
^{^} Shipments figures based on certification alone.
