= That's What I Get for Lovin' You =

Single by Diamond Rio

from the album IV
- B-side: "Big (instrumental)"
- Released: April 1996
- Recorded: 1995
- Genre: Country
- Length: 3:19
- Label: Arista Nashville 2992
- Songwriters: Kent Blazy, Neil Thrasher
- Producers: Monty Powell; Tim DuBois; Michael D. Clute; Diamond Rio

Diamond Rio singles chronology
| "Walkin' Away" (1995) | "That's What I Get for Lovin' You" (1996) | "It's All in Your Head" (1996) |

"That's What I Get for Lovin' You" is a song written by Kent Blazy and Neil Thrasher, and recorded by American country music group Diamond Rio. It was released in April 1996 as the second single from their album IV. It peaked at number 4 in the United States, and number 19 in Canada. It was featured on the Greatest Hits II collection in 2006.

== Content ==
In this song, the narrator says how his love has turned him around and that the rewards of loving someone is "a dream that is real" and "a heart that beats true". No music video was made for this song.

== Chart performance ==
| Chart (1996) | Peak position |
|---|---|
| Canada Country Singles (RPM) | 19 |
| US Hot Country Songs (Billboard) | 4 |

=== Year-end charts ===
| Chart (1996) | Position |
|---|---|
| US Country Songs (Billboard) | 35 |
