= Finish What We Started =

Single by Diamond Rio

from the album Love a Little Stronger
- B-side: "Appalachian Dream"
- Released: May 1995
- Genre: Country
- Length: 3:18
- Label: Arista
- Songwriters: Michael Noble, Monty Powell
- Producers: Monty Powell, Tim DuBois

Diamond Rio singles chronology
"Bubba Hyde" (1995)	"Finish What We Started" (1995)	"Walkin' Away" (1995)

"Finish What We Started" is a song written Michael Noble and Monty Powell, and recorded by American country music group Diamond Rio. It was released in May 1995 as the fourth and final single from the album Love a Little Stronger. The song reached #19 on the Billboard Hot Country Singles & Tracks chart.

== Chart performance ==
Chart (1995)	Peak position
Canada Country Singles (RPM)	23
US Hot Country Songs (Billboard)	19
