= Close to the Edge (Diamond Rio album) =

Studio album by Diamond Rio
- Released: October 27, 1992
- Studios: Midtown Tone & Volume, Room & Board Recording and Masterfonics (Nashville, Tennessee); The Castle (Franklin, Tennessee)
- Genre: Country
- Length: 35:45
- Label: Arista
- Producers: Tim DuBois Monty Powell

Diamond Rio chronology
Diamond Rio (1991)	Close to the Edge (1992)	Love a Little Stronger (1994)

Singles from Close to the Edge
- 1. "In a Week or Two" Released: November 2, 1992; 2. "Oh Me, Oh My, Sweet Baby" Released: March 15, 1993; 3. "This Romeo Ain't Got Julie Yet" Released: July 5, 1993; 4. "Sawmill Road" Released: November 27, 1993

Professional ratings
Review scores
Source	Rating
Allmusic	link
Chicago Tribune	link
Entertainment Weekly	B link

Close to the Edge is the second studio album by American country music group Diamond Rio. Released in 1992 on Arista Records, it produced the singles "In a Week or Two", "Oh Me, Oh My, Sweet Baby", "This Romeo Ain't Got Julie Yet", and "Sawmill Road". These singles respectively reached #2, #5, #13 and #21 on the Billboard country charts between 1992 and 1993; the album was certified gold in the United States. "Oh Me, Oh My, Sweet Baby" was previously recorded by George Strait on his 1989 album Beyond the Blue Neon.

== Track listing ==
No.	Title	Writer(s)	Length
1.	"Oh Me, Oh My, Sweet Baby"	Michael Garvin, Tom Shapiro	3:16
2.	"In a Week or Two"	James House, Gary Burr	3:00
3.	"It Does Get Better Than This"	Robert Ellis Orrall, Billy Spencer	3:25
4.	"Sawmill Road"	Sam Hogin, Dan Truman, Jim McBride	4:52
5.	"Calling All Hearts (Come Back Home)"	Monty Powell, Kent Blazy, Royal Wade Kimes	3:07
6.	"This Romeo Ain't Got Julie Yet"	Jimmy Olander, Eric Silver	2:44
7.	"I Was Meant to Be With You"	Tim DuBois, Powell, Debi Cochran, Marty Roe	3:17
8.	"Old Weakness (Coming On Strong)"	Powell, Chapin Hartford	3:18
9.	"Demons and Angels"	Judy Rodman, Ronnie Samoset	3:18
10.	"Nothing in This World"	Olander, Silver	3:01
11.	"Close to the Edge"	Gene Johnson, Carl Jackson	2:35

== Personnel ==
Diamond Rio

- Marty Roe – lead vocals, acoustic guitars
- Dan Truman – keyboards
- Jimmy Olander – lead guitars
- Gene Johnson – mandolin, backing vocals
- Dana Williams – bass, backing vocals
- Brian Prout – drums

== Production ==
- Tim DuBois – producer
- Monty Powell – producer
- Mike Clute – engineer, mixing
- John Hurley – additional recording, assistant engineer, mix assistant
- John Kunz – additional recording, assistant engineer
- Herb Tassin – additional recording, assistant engineer
- Pasquale DelVillaggio – assistant engineer, production assistant
- Glenn Meadows – mastering at Masterfonics
- Ramona Simmons – project administrator
- Maude Gilman – art direction
- Jeff Frazier – photography
- Sheri McCoy – stylist
- Ted Hacker for International Artist Management – management

== Chart performance ==
Chart (1992)	Peak position
U.S. Billboard Top Country Albums	24
U.S. Billboard 200	87

== Certifications ==
Certifications for Close to the Edge
Region	Certification	Certified units/sales
United States (RIAA)	Gold	500,000^{^}
^{^} Shipments figures based on certification alone.
