= McAlyster =

American country music group

- Origin: Pensacola, Florida, United States
- Genre: Country
- Years active: 2000
- Label: MCA Nashville
- Past members: Cody Collins; Valerie Gills; Leigh Usilton; Josh Walther

McAlyster was an American country music group founded in Pensacola, Florida. Its members comprised Cody Collins, Josh Walther, Leigh Usilton and Valerie Gills. They were signed to MCA Nashville Records in 2000. Their debut single, "I Know How the River Feels", was previously a No. 32 country single in 1999 for Diamond Rio, and was originally recorded by Ty Herndon on his 1996 album Living in a Moment. McAlyster's demo rendition was released as a single, peaking at No. 69 on the country charts. Billboard gave their version a mixed review, praising the harmonies but questioning its appeal to the country format. McAlyster released no other material and broke up after this single.

In 2007, former member Cody Collins succeeded Richie McDonald as lead singer of the group Lonestar for one album, Party Heard Around the World, while Walther began a solo career leading the Tampa-based cover band Phase 5 which shared the stage with Paul McCartney at an event for McCartney's stepson in 2015. Usilton now works as a vocal coach.

== Singles ==
Year	Single	Peak positions
Year	Single	US Country
2000	"I Know How the River Feels"	69

== Music Videos ==
Year	Video
2000	"I Know How the River Feels"
