= A Diamond Rio Christmas: The Star Still Shines =

Studio album by Diamond Rio
- Released: October 9, 2007
- Genres: Country, Christmas
- Length: 38:35
- Label: Word
- Producers: Mike Clute; Diamond Rio

Diamond Rio chronology
Greatest Hits II (2006)	A Diamond Rio Christmas: The Star Still Shines (2007)	16 Biggest Hits (2008)

Professional ratings
Review scores
Source	Rating
About.com	link
Allmusic	link

A Diamond Rio Christmas: The Star Still Shines is the eighth studio and first and-to-date only Christmas album from noted country artists Diamond Rio. The album was the band's first release on their new label, Word Records. The album peaked at number 57 on the Billboard Country chart.

== Track listing ==
No.	Title	Writer(s)	Length
1.	"The Star Still Shines"	John Colgin, Don Poythress, Michael Puryear	3:59
2.	"Winter Wonderland"	Dick Smith, Felix Bernard	2:53
3.	"The Christmas Song (Chestnuts Roasting on an Open Fire)"	Mel Tormé, Robert Wells	3:19
4.	"Let It Snow, Let It Snow, Let It Snow"	Sammy Cahn, Jule Styne	2:34
5.	"O Come, O Come Emmanuel"	public domain	2:52
6.	"Sleigh Ride"	Leroy Anderson, Mitchell Parish	4:51
7.	"Christmas Time Is Here"	Vince Guaraldi, Lee Mendelson	2:48
8.	"I'll Be Home for Christmas"	Buck Ram, Walter Kent, Kim Gannon	3:56
9.	"Christmas Time's A-Comin'"	Tex Logan	2:46
10.	"Hark! the Herald Angels Sing"	public domain	2:15
11.	"Have Yourself a Merry Little Christmas"	Ralph Blane, Hugh Martin	3:59
12.	"Christmas Is Coming – from A Charlie Brown Christmas"	Vince Guaraldi	2:22

== Personnel ==
Diamond Rio

- Marty Roe – lead vocals
- Dan Truman – keyboards, acoustic piano, string arrangements
- Jimmy Olander – programming, acoustic guitars, electric guitars, banjo, string arrangements
- Gene Johnson – mandolin, tenor vocals
- Dana Williams – bass, baritone vocals
- Brian Prout – drums

== Production ==
- Diamond Rio – producers
- Mike Clute – producer, engineer, mixing
- Jimmy Olander – engineer
- Hank Williams – mastering at MasterMix (Nashville, Tennessee)
- Katherine Petillo – creative director
- Russ Harrington – photography
- Paula Turner – groomer

== Chart performance ==
Chart (2007)	Peak position
U.S. Billboard Top Christian Albums	28
U.S. Billboard Top Country Albums	56
U.S. Billboard Top Holiday Albums	18
