= The Reason (Diamond Rio album) =

Studio album by Diamond Rio
- Released: September 22, 2009
- Studios: Casa de Twang and Bennich Studio (Franklin, Tennessee)
- Genres: Country, Christian
- Length: 42:23
- Label: Word
- Producers: Michael Clute; Jimmy Olander; Diamond Rio

Diamond Rio chronology
16 Biggest Hits (2008)	The Reason (2009)	Live (2014)

Professional ratings
Review scores
Source	Rating
AllMusic	4.5/5 stars

The Reason is the ninth studio album from American Country band Diamond Rio, released on September 22, 2009, by Word Records, their second and final studio release with the label.

== Track listing ==
1. "The Reason" (Joe Beck, Jimmy Olander, Marty Roe) - 3:08
2. "This Is My Life" (Olander, Roe, Matthew West) - 3:52
3. "God Is There" (Bernie Herms, Olander, Roe) - 4:19
4. "Reaching for Me" (Michael Boggs, Chad R. Cates) - 3:40
5. "Into Your Hands" (Chris Eaton, Olander, Roe) - 4:08
6. "Just Love" (Eaton, Olander, Roe) - 4:16
7. "Moments of Heaven on Earth" (Don Pfrimmer, Dan Truman) - 3:43
8. "My God Does" (Sarah Buxton, Bob DiPiero, Craig Wiseman) - 3:45
9. "Wherever I Am" (Olander, Roe, West) - 3:55
10. "What Are We Gonna Do Now" (Beck, Chaz Bosarge, Dana Williams) - 4:15
11. "In God We Still Trust" (Rob LeClair, Bill Nash, Kim Nash) - 3:22

== Personnel ==
Diamond Rio

- Marty Roe – lead vocals
- Dan Truman – acoustic piano
- Jimmy Olander – guitars
- Gene Johnson – mandolin, tenor vocals
- Dana Williams – bass, baritone vocals
- Brian Prout – drums

== Production ==
- Jamie Kiner – A&R direction
- Diamond Rio – producers
- Jimmy Olander – producer
- Mike Clute – producer, engineer, mixing
- Hank Williams – mastering at MasterMix (Nashville, Tennessee)
- Katherine Petillo – art direction
- Bert Sumner – design
- Russ Harrington – photography
- Paula Turner – grooming
- Heather Robinson – wardrobe stylist
- Modern Management, Inc. – management

== Awards ==
At the 41st GMA Dove Awards, The Reason won a Dove Award for Country Album of the Year. Also, the song "God Is There" was nominated for Song of the Year and Country Recorded Song of the Year.

On February 13, 2011, the album won the Grammy Award for Best Southern, Country or Bluegrass Gospel Album.

== Chart performance ==
Chart (2009)	Peak position
U.S. Billboard Top Country Albums	41
U.S. Billboard Top Christian Albums	17
