= We Made It =

We Made It may refer to:

- "We Made It" (Busta Rhymes song), with Linkin Park, 2008
- "We Made It" (Louis Tomlinson song), 2019
- "We Made It", a song by H.E.R. from Back of My Mind, 2021
- "We Made It", a song by Soulja Boy, 2013
- "We Made It", a song by Tito Jackson from Tito Time, 2016
- "We Made It", a song by Toto from Toto IV, 1982
- We Made It, a fictional planet in Larry Niven's Known Space universe

== See also ==
- "Looks Like We Made It", a song by Barry Manilow
