= This Romeo Ain't Got Julie Yet =

Single by Diamond Rio

from the album Close to the Edge
- B-side: "I Was Meant To Be With You"
- Released: July 5, 1993
- Recorded: 1992
- Genre: Country
- Length: 2:44
- Label: Arista Nashville
- Songwriters: Jimmy Olander; Eric Silver
- Producers: Tim DuBois; Monty Powell

Diamond Rio singles chronology
"Oh Me, Oh My, Sweet Baby" (1993)	"This Romeo Ain't Got Julie Yet" (1993)	"Sawmill Road" (1993)

"This Romeo Ain't Got Julie Yet" is a song written by Jimmy Olander and Eric Silver, and recorded by American country music group Diamond Rio. It was released in July 1993 as the third single from their album Close to the Edge. It peaked at number 13 in the United States, and number 5 in Canada.

== Music video ==
The music video was directed by directing duo Deaton-Flanigen and was released in summer of 1993. The video shows concert performances, along with behind-the-scenes footage from the group's 1992 show at Astroworld in Houston, Texas.

== Chart performance ==
Chart (1993)	Peak position
Canada Country Singles (RPM)	5
US Hot Country Songs (Billboard)	13

=== Year-end charts ===
Chart (1993)	Position
Canada Country Tracks (RPM)	83
