= Night Is Fallin' in My Heart =

Single by Diamond Rio

from the album Love a Little Stronger
- B-side: "Down By the Riverside"
- Released: October 4, 1994
- Recorded: 1994
- Genre: Country
- Length: 3:32
- Label: Arista Nashville 12764
- Songwriter: Dennis Linde
- Producers: Monty Powell, Tim DuBois

Diamond Rio singles chronology
"Love a Little Stronger" (1994)	"Night Is Fallin' in My Heart" (1994)	"Bubba Hyde" (1995)

"Night Is Fallin' in My Heart" is a song written by Dennis Linde. The song was first recorded by country music artist J.P. Pennington for his 1991 album, Whatever It Takes. It was later recorded and released as a single in October 1994 by American country music group Diamond Rio. It was the second single released from their third album, Love a Little Stronger. It peaked at No. 9 in the United States, and No. 6 in Canada.

== Chart performance ==
Chart (1994–1995)	Peak position
Canada Country Singles (RPM)	6
US Hot Country Songs (Billboard)	9

=== Year-end charts ===
Chart (1995)	Position
Canada Country Tracks (RPM)	84
