= Bubba Hyde =

Single by Diamond Rio

from the album Love a Little Stronger
- Released: February 4, 1995
- Genre: Country
- Length: 3:44
- Label: Arista
- Songwriters: Gene Nelson, Craig Wiseman
- Producers: Monty Powell, Tim DuBois

Diamond Rio singles chronology
"Night Is Fallin' in My Heart" (1994)	"Bubba Hyde" (1995)	"Finish What We Started" (1995)

"Bubba Hyde" is a song written by Gene Nelson and Craig Wiseman, and recorded by American country music group Diamond Rio. It was released in February 1995 as the third single from the group's 1994 album Love a Little Stronger. The song reached No. 16 on the Billboard Hot Country Singles & Tracks chart.

== Content ==
The song is about a mild-mannered grocery store employee, Barney Jekyll, who, on Friday nights, puts on leather boots and an "Elvis jacket" and drives a sports car to a honky-tonk, where he goes by the name of "Bubba Hyde". The song is a reference to the 1886 novella Strange Case of Dr Jekyll and Mr Hyde by Robert Louis Stevenson.

== Music video ==
The music video was directed by Deaton-Flanigen Productions and premiered in January 1995. It stars Jm J. Bullock, best-known for playing Monroe Ficus on the sitcom Too Close for Comfort and Prince Valium in Spaceballs, as Barney Jekyll/Bubba Hyde.

== Chart performance ==
Chart (1995)	Peak position
Canada Country Singles (RPM)	12
US Bubbling Under Hot 100 (Billboard)	2
US Hot Country Songs (Billboard)	16
