= IV (Diamond Rio album) =

Studio album by Diamond Rio
- Released: February 27, 1996
- Studios: Midtown Tone & Volume and Masterfonics (Nashville, Tennessee)
- Genre: Country
- Length: 37:51
- Label: Arista
- Producers: Mike Clute Diamond Rio Tim DuBois

Diamond Rio chronology
Love a Little Stronger (1994)	IV (1996)	Greatest Hits (1997)

Singles from IV
- 1. "Walkin' Away" Released: November 27, 1995; 2. "That's What I Get for Lovin' You" Released: April 1996; 3. "It's All in Your Head" Released: August 19, 1996; 4. "Holdin'" Released: December 9, 1996

Professional ratings
Review scores
Source	Rating
AllMusic	4/5 stars
Entertainment Weekly	B

IV is the fourth studio album by American country music band Diamond Rio. It produced the Top 5 singles "Walkin' Away", "That's What I Get for Lovin' You" and "Holdin'", as well as the #15 "It's All in Your Head". "She Misses Him on Sunday the Most" was released as a single in Germany only. The album itself was certified gold in the United States.

== Track listing ==
No.	Title	Writer(s)	Length
1.	"Holdin'"	Craig Wiseman, Kelly Garrett	3:12
2.	"Walkin' Away"	Wiseman, Annie Roboff	3:51
3.	"That's What I Get for Lovin' You"	Neil Thrasher, Kent Blazy	3:18
4.	"She Misses Him on Sunday the Most"	Bobby Tomberlin, Steven Dale Jones	3:27
5.	"She Sure Did Like to Run"	Tomberlin, Walt Aldridge	3:09
6.	"It's All in Your Head"	Van Stephenson, Reese Wilson, Tony Martin	3:40
7.	"Who Am I?"	Randy Albright, Debi Cochran	3:48
8.	"Love Takes You There"	John Nance Sharp, Mary Ann Kennedy, Christopher Morris	3:15
9.	"Is That Askin' Too Much"	Wiseman, Donny Lowery	3:56
10.	"Just Another Heart"	Skip Ewing, Tim Johnson	3:29
11.	"Big" (instrumental track)	Jimmy Olander	2:46

== Personnel ==
Diamond Rio

- Marty Roe – lead vocals
- Dan Truman – keyboards
- Jimmy Olander – acoustic guitars, electric guitars
- Gene Johnson – mandolin, backing vocals
- Dana Williams – bass, backing vocals
- Brian Prout – drums

Additional musicians

- Carl Marsh – digital programming

== Production ==
- Diamond Rio – producers
- Tim DuBois – producer
- Mike Clute – producer, engineer, mixing
- Art Gillespie – additional engineer, assistant engineer
- Matt Svobodny – additional engineer, assistant engineer
- Pete Miskinis – assistant engineer
- Glenn Meadows – digital editing, mastering
- Jennifer C. Rose – production assistant
- Maude Gilman – art direction, design
- S. Wade Hunt – design
- Bret Lopez – photography
- John Scarpati – photography
- Ted Hacker for International Artist Management – management

== Charts ==
=== Weekly charts ===
Chart (1996)	Peak position
Canadian Country Albums (RPM)	4
US Billboard 200	92
US Top Country Albums (Billboard)	14

=== Year-end charts ===
Chart (1996)	Position
US Top Country Albums (Billboard)	69

== Certifications ==
Certifications for IV
Region	Certification	Certified units/sales
United States (RIAA)	Gold	500,000^{^}
^{^} Shipments figures based on certification alone.
