= Diamond Rio =

American country and Christian music band

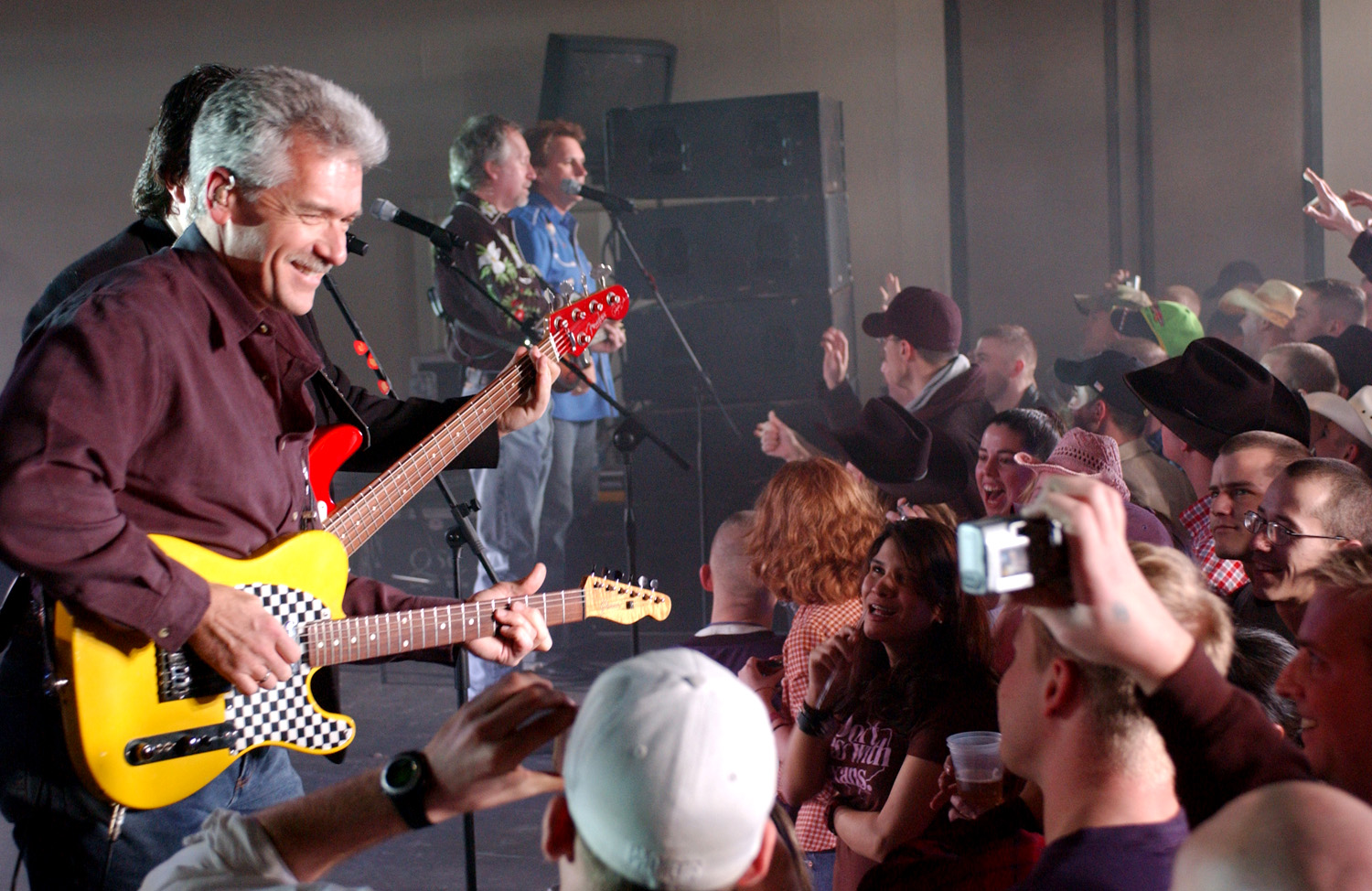
- Diamond Rio performing at Kunsan Air Base, 2006

Background information
- Also known as: Grizzly River Boys; Tennessee River Boys
- Origin: Nashville, Tennessee, United States
- Genres: Country; CCM
- Works: Diamond Rio discography
- Years active: 1982–present
- Labels: Arista Nashville; Word; Rio Hot
- Members: Dan Truman; Marty Roe; Jimmy Olander; Dana Williams; Carson McKee; Micah Schweinsberg
- Past members: Matt Davenport; Danny Gregg; Ty Herndon; Larry Beard; Mel Deal; Al DeLeonibus; Ed Mummert; Anthony Crawford; Virgil True; Jimmy "J.J." Whiteside; Gene Johnson; Brian Prout
- Website: http://diamondrio.com

Diamond Rio is an American country music band from Nashville, Tennessee. The band consists of Marty Roe (lead vocals, guitar), Jimmy Olander (lead guitar, banjo), Dan Truman (keyboards), Dana Williams (bass guitar, vocals), Micah Schweinsberg (drums), and Carson McKee (fiddle, mandolin, vocals). The band was founded in 1982 as an attraction for the Opryland USA theme park in Nashville, Tennessee, and was originally known as the Grizzly River Boys, then the Tennessee River Boys. It was founded by vocalists Matt Davenport, Danny Gregg, and Ty Herndon, the last of whom became a solo artist in the mid-1990s. After undergoing several membership changes in its initial years, the band held the same membership from 1989 to 2023, which consisted of Roe, Olander, Truman, Williams, Brian Prout (drums), and Gene Johnson (fiddle, mandolin, vocals). After the latter two retired in 2022, they were respectively replaced by Schweinsberg and McKee.

Diamond Rio was signed to Arista Nashville in 1991 and debuted with the single "Meet in the Middle", which made them the first band ever to send a debut single to No. 1 on the Billboard Hot Country Songs charts. The band charted 32 more singles between then and 2006, including four more that reached No. 1: "How Your Love Makes Me Feel" (1997), "One More Day" (2001), "Beautiful Mess" (2002), and "I Believe" (2003).

Diamond Rio has recorded nine studio albums, four Greatest Hits compilations, and an album of Christmas music. Three of the band's albums have achieved RIAA platinum certification in the United States. In addition, Diamond Rio has received four Group of the Year awards from the Country Music Association, two Top Vocal Group awards from the Academy of Country Music, and one Grammy Award. The band is known for its vocal harmonies, varied instrumentation, and near-exclusive use of only its own band members on recordings instead of session musicians. Their sound was originally defined by mainstream country, bluegrass, and rock influences, but later albums drew more influence from Christian country music and country pop.

== Beginnings ==
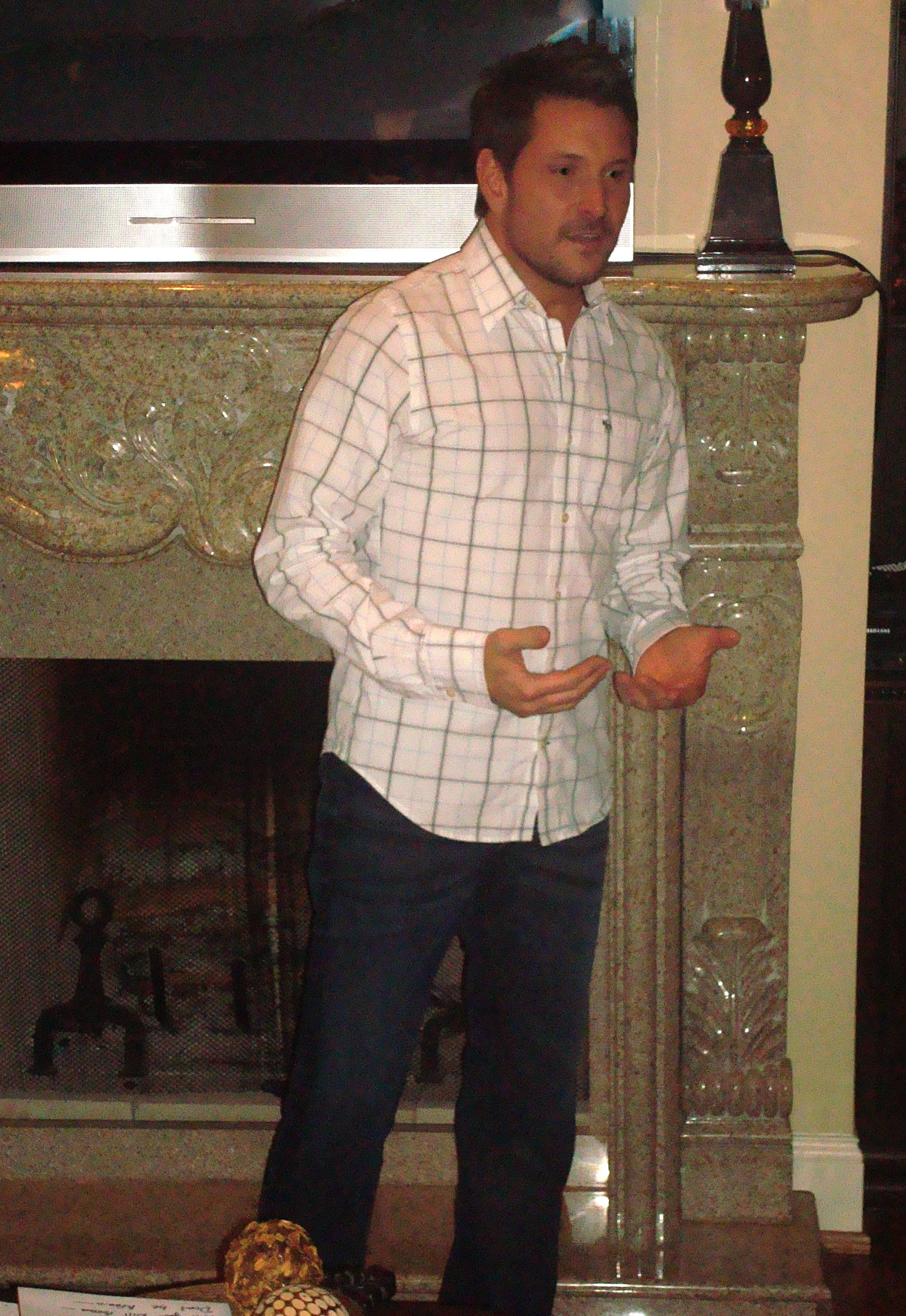
Ty Herndon (seen here in 2009) was an early member of the Grizzly River Boys, who later became Diamond Rio.

In 1982, Matt Davenport and Danny Gregg founded a band at Opryland USA, a former country music-based amusement park in Nashville, Tennessee. The band was first named the Grizzly River Boys, after a new river rafting ride at the park, but quickly changed names to the Tennessee River Boys due to its members disliking the original name. Originally intended to promote the park through a one-time television special, the band proved popular enough that it became one of many regular performers there. Davenport, Gregg, and Ty Herndon alternated as lead vocalists, with Davenport also playing bass guitar and Gregg on rhythm guitar; completing the lineup were Larry Beard (lead guitar, fiddle, banjo), Mel Deal (steel guitar), Al DeLeonibus (piano), and Ed Mummert (drums). The group "swapped lead voices, told jokes, and balanced old-school country concert shtick with a contemporary sound". Herndon left the group in 1983 to compete on the talent show Star Search, and became a solo artist for Epic Records between 1995 and the early 2000s. Herndon was temporarily replaced by Anthony Crawford and then Virgil True before his role was taken over by Marty Roe, who had originally toured nationally with the Christian band Windsong, and worked in the park by doing impersonations of Larry Gatlin. Following Herndon's departure, DeLonibus and Mummert quit as well, with Dan Truman (who had previously played in Brigham Young University's Young Ambassadors) and Jimmy "J. J." Whiteside taking their places. Beard quit shortly afterward and ultimately became a session musician, and former Mel McDaniel sideman Jimmy Olander took his place. The band, through the assistance of Bill Anderson's drummer Len "Snuffy" Miller, submitted demos to various Nashville record labels with no success.

By 1985, the Tennessee River Boys had quit working at Opryland. According to Roe, while the band enjoyed playing at the park, they also felt that their status as a theme park attraction discredited them as "real musicians" to those in the Nashville community. For the next few years, they played at small venues, such as high school auditoriums, and usually worked no more than four concerts a month. They also competed on Star Search, but were eliminated in the first round. Frustrated by the sporadic touring schedules, Whiteside quit the group and was replaced by Brian Prout, who previously performed in Hot Walker Band and Heartbreak Mountain. Around 1986, Deal and Gregg both left the group, the latter due to health complications from a serious illness he had developed as a teenager. They initially chose to operate as a quintet, with Davenport as the sole lead vocalist and Roe and Prout singing harmony; when this arrangement proved unsuccessful, they found mandolinist Gene Johnson, a former member of the bluegrass group Eddie Adcock's IInd Generation, which Olander was a fan of as a child. Johnson debuted at a concert in Clewiston, Florida, in May 1987. Also at this point, the band members supplemented their incomes with outside jobs: Johnson continued to work in carpentry, Olander and Roe mowed lawns, and Prout drove tour buses.

In 1988, the band caught the attention of Keith Stegall, a singer-songwriter who would later become known primarily for his work as Alan Jackson's record producer. Stegall produced demos for the Tennessee River Boys, but noted that Davenport could not record the lead vocal and bass parts at the same time, as they would be difficult to separate in the control room. As a result, Stegall had Roe sing a "scratch" vocal track live with the other musicians, which would then be replaced by Davenport's voice in post-production. Upon hearing Roe sing the "scratch" track, Stegall successfully convinced the other members that Roe should be the lead vocalist instead. Due to his discomfort outside the lead role and his wife's dissatisfaction with his career, Davenport quit in late 1988, becoming the last founding member to leave. The group quickly had to find a replacement, as they were scheduled to appear on the talk show Nashville Now on January 23, 1989. Alan LeBeouf, who had just left Baillie & the Boys, expressed interest in replacing Davenport but ultimately declined due to other commitments. They finally chose Dana Williams, a nephew of the bluegrass group Osborne Brothers and former sideman for Jimmy C. Newman, who had been a fan of the Tennessee River Boys since Herndon was a member.

=== 1990: Signing with Arista Nashville ===
Williams officially joined before the Nashville Now appearance, but the band still did not have a record deal at this point. They continued to record demos in Prout's garage with assistance from Monty Powell, who had previously hired Roe and Olander for recording jingles, but wanted to produce commercial music. Powell was a friend of audio engineer Mike Clute, who would later become one of the band's producers, and songwriters Tim DuBois and Van Stephenson. DuBois was talking with record executive Clive Davis about creating a country music branch of Arista Records called Arista Nashville; Stephenson would later sign to the label in 1993 as a member of Blackhawk. Initially, DuBois was hesitant about signing the Tennessee River Boys, as he felt that there were too many popular bands in country music, and he was about to sign both Asleep at the Wheel and Exile. He expressed interest in signing Roe as a solo artist, but at Powell's insistence, he agreed to see the band open for George Jones at a May 1989 concert, and officially signed them to Arista Nashville in 1990. The band members also decided to choose a new name, as they thought that Tennessee River Boys sounded more suitable for a bluegrass or gospel group than a country one. Among the names they had chosen were Kilroy and T-Town Mavericks, the latter of which was rejected by Arista executives. Prout suggested Diamond Rio, after the truck manufacturing company Diamond Reo Trucks. The name had been previously rejected by another country band, Shenandoah, whose lead singer Marty Raybon (also a former member of Heartbreak Mountain) gave Prout permission to use the name even though Shenandoah "conducted business" under that name.

Shortly after the band received its record deal, the band underwent a series of misfortunes when Olander, Johnson, and Williams came down with health problems. On August 9, 1990, Johnson was injured in a carpentry accident in Arkansas a day before his 41st birthday, severely cutting his left thumb. Robert Bolin substituted for Johnson during the band's tour in Brazil with Kevin Welch and Jann Browne. On September 6, four weeks after Johnson's accident, Williams was water skiing with his family in Cookeville, Tennessee, as his boat came forward at high speed when his wife was picking him up. The propeller slashed Williams' legs, and he was rushed to a hospital for his injuries. Brian Helgos and Paul Gregg (Danny Gregg's brother, and a member of Restless Heart) substituted for Williams. Meanwhile, Olander discovered that he had a lemon-sized tumor that was pressing against his esophagus. The tumor was never successfully diagnosed, although it ultimately vanished.

== Musical career ==
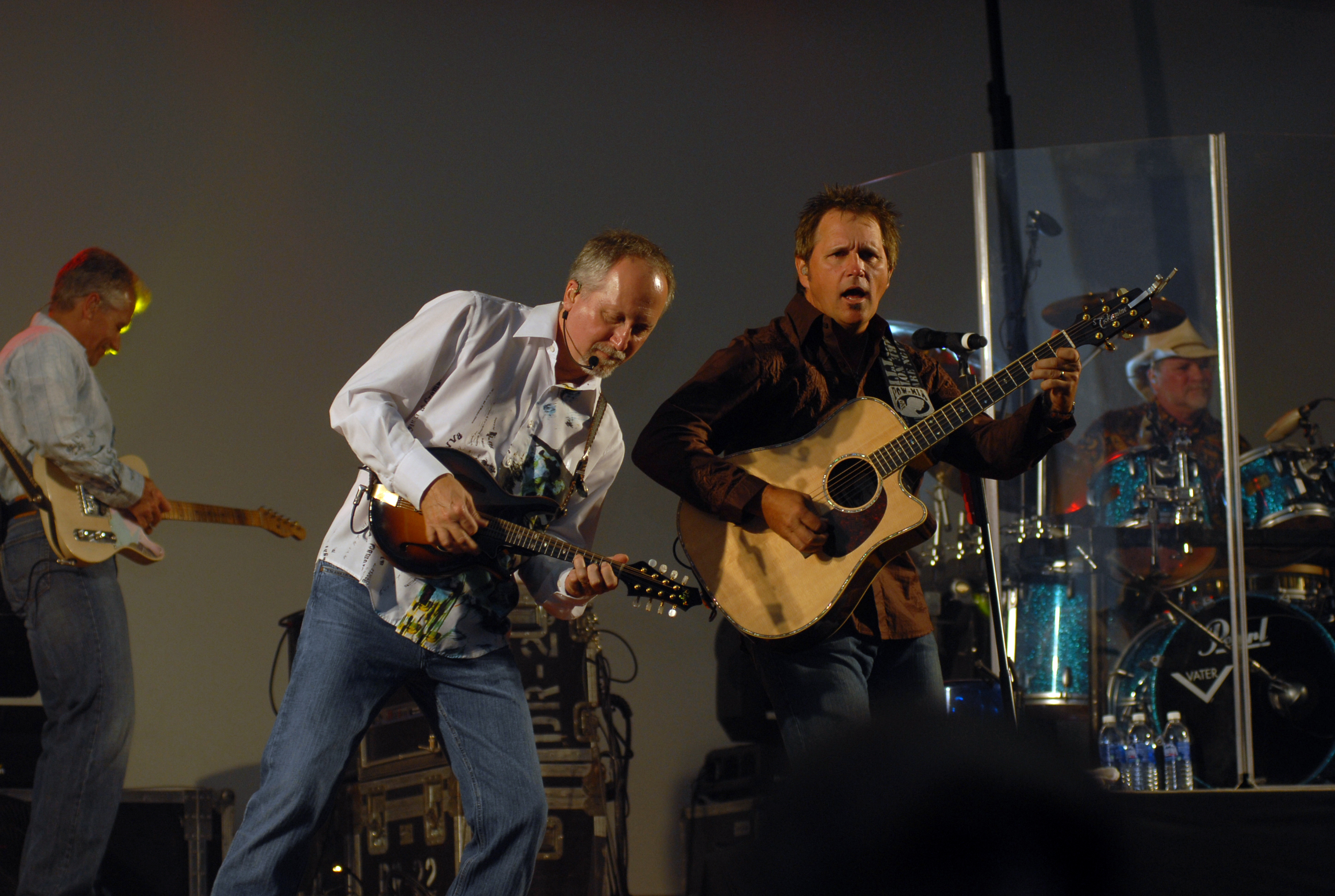
Diamond Rio in 2008.

=== 1991–1992: Diamond Rio ===
After Olander, Williams, and Johnson had recovered, the six musicians set to work on their debut album. In doing so, Johnson soon discovered that the injuries to his hands had altered his dexterity on the mandolin, and threatened to walk away after Powell offhandedly remarked that he would have Roe dub in his own tenor harmonies instead of having Johnson sing them. The band also had commitments to finish as the Tennessee River Boys, to the point that they occasionally had to promote themselves under both names in the same day.

Arista Nashville released Diamond Rio's debut single, "Meet in the Middle", on February 6, 1991. As the lead single to their self-titled debut album, "Meet in the Middle" went on to spend two weeks at No. 1 on the Billboard Hot Country Songs charts, making Diamond Rio the first country music group ever to send its debut single to the top of that chart. Following its release, the band performed its first official concert as Diamond Rio on May 4, 1991. They shared the bill with Wild Rose, whose membership included Prout's then-wife, Nancy Given Prout. Released three weeks later with DuBois and Powell as producers, Diamond Rio was met with positive critical reception. AllMusic, Chicago Tribune, and Entertainment Weekly all praised the band's vocal harmonies, instrumentation, and song choices.

Four more singles were released from Diamond Rio, all reaching top 10 on the Billboard country singles charts: "Mirror, Mirror", "Mama Don't Forget to Pray for Me", "Norma Jean Riley" (which was previously the B-side of "Mama Don't Forget to Pray for Me"), and "Nowhere Bound", the latter two of which were co-written by Powell. Roe and Prout had found both "Mama Don't Forget to Pray for Me" and "Mirror, Mirror" by attending shows at the Bluebird Cafe in Nashville, a popular spot for performances by aspiring songwriters. Truman and an employee of Arista had found "Norma Jean Riley", which was originally titled "Pretty Little Lady" until DuBois remarked that the lady in the song should have a name: "It could be 'Norma Jean Riley', anything!" Johnson spoke positively about "Mama Don't Forget to Pray for Me", which was written and originally recorded by Larry Cordle, and the impact that it had on fans. He recalled a letter sent to him by a female fan who had run away from home and chose to return after hearing that song, and said that "We already didn't wanna do the drinkin' songs and stuff ... if you're gonna touch someone, touch them with something that's positive."

Diamond Rio was later certified platinum by the Recording Industry Association of America (RIAA) for shipping one million copies in the United States. In addition, the band won the Academy of Country Music's Top Vocal Group for 1992, an award they would receive again in 1993, 1994, and 1997. They were also nominated for Top New Vocal Duet or Group by the same association in 1992. A cut from the album, the instrumental "Poultry Promenade", gave the band its first Grammy Award nomination.

=== 1992–1995: Close to the Edge and Love a Little Stronger ===
Close to the Edge, the group's second album, was released in 1992. Certified gold by the RIAA for U.S. shipments of 500,000 copies, the album produced the Top 5 country hits "In a Week or Two" and "Oh Me, Oh My, Sweet Baby", the latter of which was originally recorded by George Strait on his 1989 album Beyond the Blue Neon. The next singles, "This Romeo Ain't Got Julie Yet" and "Sawmill Road", both failed to reach top 10. Roe considered Close to the Edge a weaker album than their debut because the band only had one month to pick the songs for it; in a 1994 interview with New Country magazine, he stated: "There aren't ten great songs out there for everybody, certainly not that you could find in a 30-day period of time." Olander was also critical of the novelty factor of "This Romeo Ain't Got Julie Yet", which he co-wrote, saying that it was "by far not my favorite Diamond Rio recording – but that's at the time when I'm thinkin', 'Oh, this is easy, let's write this. It's kinda cute.'" Brian Mansfield of Allmusic was also critical of the song, but described the rest of the album with favor, saying that its "strongest material emphasizes the virtues of God, family and honest living – traditional stuff, no doubt influenced by the members' bluegrass background", while Jack Hurst of the Chicago Tribune thought that "In a Week or Two" and "Sawmill Road", "which is about the diverse trails some rural schoolmates follow in adulthood", were the strongest tracks.

In 1994, the band released its third album, Love a Little Stronger. The album was recorded on a more relaxed schedule than the previous album; as a result, they did not have a single on the charts for three months after "Sawmill Road" fell off the charts. For this album, Clute joined DuBois and Powell as co-producer, a role that he has held on all of the band's subsequent releases. The title track (co-written by Billy Crittenden, later a member of the vocal group 4 Runner), reached a peak of No. 2 on the Billboard country singles charts, and No. 1 on the country singles chart published by Radio & Records. It was followed by the No. 9 hit "Night Is Fallin' in My Heart", originally recorded by J. P. Pennington in 1991. Next were the Top 20 hits "Bubba Hyde" and "Finish What We Started". Because the band had taken a longer period of time to choose songs for Love a Little Stronger, they considered it a superior album to its predecessor; Mansfield shared a similar opinion in his review of the album, stating that "Spurred by the relatively lackluster performance of Close to the Edge ... Diamond Rio explored the musical possibilities of its talents rather than digging for easy commercial success." Bob Cannon of New Country was more mixed, saying that "the production on Love a Little Stronger is so sparkling clean it could've been recorded in an operating room." This album also earned the band its second platinum certification.

=== 1996–1999: IV, Greatest Hits, and Unbelievable ===
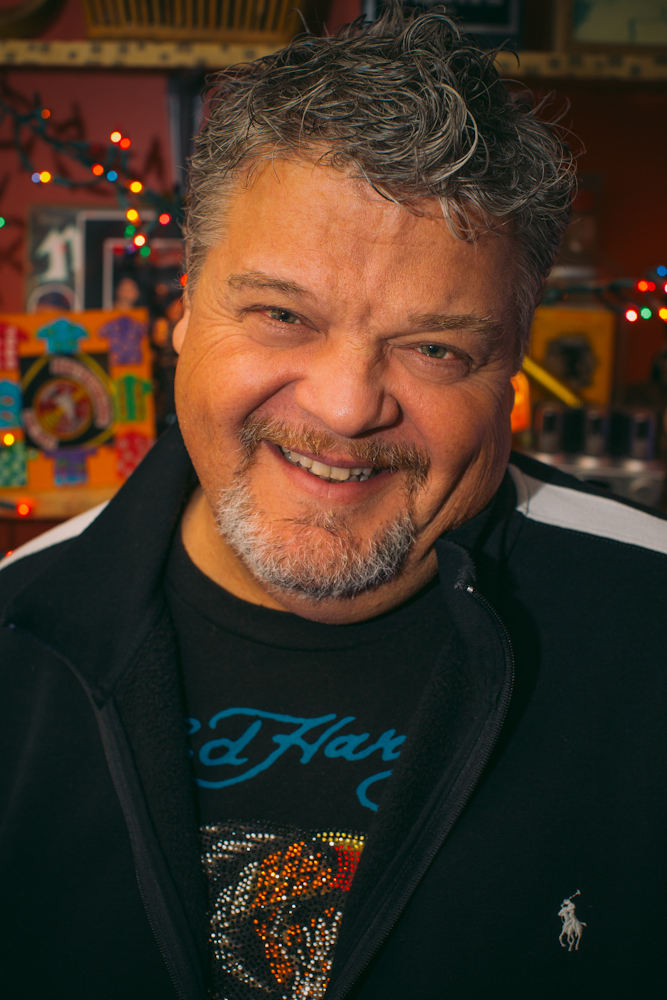
Craig Wiseman wrote the band's singles "Bubba Hyde", "Walkin' Away", and "Holdin'".

IV, Diamond Rio's fourth album, was released in 1996. It was the "first country release recorded entirely on a digital console"; specifically, a Fairlight console which recorded the album directly to a hard drive. Produced by DuBois, Clute, and the band itself, it was also their first album not to have Powell as a co-producer. According to DuBois, Powell left this role on good terms, as he "saw a need to go in a certain direction, and the guys saw a need to go in a different direction." Roe thought that the album benefited from a new label policy that allowed label personnel to respond more quickly to pitches from songwriters. He recalled to Billboard that the label's head of artists and repertoire (A&R) recommended the lead single "Walkin' Away" while co-writer Craig Wiseman (who co-wrote "Bubba Hyde") was still recording its demo, and the band was able to record the song in the same day that the demo was completed. "Walkin' Away" peaked at No. 2 on the country charts in early 1996. Three more singles were released from the album: the top 10 hits "That's What I Get for Lovin' You" and "Holdin'" (also written by Wiseman), with the top 20 "It's All in Your Head", co-written by Van Stephenson, in between. The music video for "It's All in Your Head" featured Martin Sheen and Ramon Estevez, the former playing the part of a snake handling preacher.

A year after IV, Diamond Rio released its first Greatest Hits package, which included eleven of the singles from their first four albums, plus the album cut "She Misses Him on Sunday the Most" from IV and two new songs: "How Your Love Makes Me Feel" and "Imagine That". "How Your Love Makes Me Feel" became the band's second No 1 on Hot Country Songs, as well as their longest-lasting at three weeks, making it the biggest chart hit for any country group that year. "Imagine That", co-written by Bryan White, reached Top 5 by early 1998. Greatest Hits became the band's third platinum album.

Diamond Rio was inducted into the Grand Ole Opry in April 1998, becoming the first band in fourteen years to be inducted. Later in the year, the band released its fifth studio album, Unbelievable. Contributing songwriters to the album included Paul Williams, former NRBQ member Al Anderson, Robert John "Mutt" Lange, and Huey Lewis. The lead single was the ballad "You're Gone", which reached top 5 on the country charts. After it was the title track, which peaked at No. 2 on the country charts and became the band's first entry on the Billboard Hot 100, where it reached No. 36. The third and final single was "I Know How the River Feels", originally recorded on Herndon's 1996 album Living in a Moment and later released as a single by McAlyster in 2000. Diamond Rio's rendition peaked at 33 on the country charts, their lowest chart peak at the time.

In 1998, Prout began dating Mary Bono, the widow of singer and politician Sonny Bono. The two became engaged but later ended their relationship in 2001. On December 28 of the same year, Prout married singer-songwriter Stephanie Bentley, best known for co-writing Faith Hill's 1999 single "Breathe".

=== 2000–2002: One More Day ===
Diamond Rio released its twenty-third official chart single, "Stuff", in May 2000. The song was originally intended to be the title track to their sixth studio album, which would have been released on August 22 of the same year, but according to Truman, "Certain radio stations, for some reason, didn't want to play 'Stuff'." As a result, "Stuff" was withdrawn after peaking at number 36 on the country charts, and the album was delayed until February 2001. Following this song's failure, the band released "One More Day" later in 2000. The song was written by Steven Dale Jones and Bobby Tomberlin, the same two writers who wrote "She Misses Him on Sunday the Most". "One More Day" went on to spend two non-consecutive weeks at No. 1 on the country charts, with the album, by this point re-titled One More Day, having its release date moved up to February 6, 2001. The song also peaked at No. 29 on the Billboard Hot 100, in addition to reaching top 10 on the Adult Contemporary charts (the band's first appearance on that chart). Regarding the song's popularity among fans who have used the song to cope with personal losses, Prout said, "Actually, 'One More Day' was recorded as a love song. Then one of Oklahoma State's basketball team's plane went down, then in early 2001 we lost Dale [Earnhardt] in Daytona, and then of course, 9/11 came after that. And every event of that year, the song took on a different meaning to different people ... We hear quite often in e-mails and people talking to us in shows. If you're asking how it makes us feel? Pretty darn special ... to know that you had that impact on someone's life and helped in a tough time of healing and hope."

The third and fourth singles from One More Day were less successful: "Sweet Summer" made Top 20, while "That's Just That" failed to make Top 40. The album featured a guest vocal from Chely Wright on "I'm Trying", making for the band's first ever duet with another artist on one of their own albums. It also included a cover of "Hearts Against the Wind", originally recorded by JD Souther and Linda Ronstadt for the Urban Cowboy soundtrack. Chris Neal of Country Weekly thought that the album showed a greater musical variety than its predecessors, specifically noting the "spoken-word verses" of "Here I Go Fallin'", the "Hearts Against the Wind" cover, and the Wright duet as standout tracks. Rick Cohoon of Allmusic cited the album's singles and the Wright duet as the album's best tracks, adding that "If any flaw can be found here it would be the band's choice not to experiment with new sound, but then again, why tamper with a good thing?"

Starting in 2001, the other members had noticed that Roe was having difficulty maintaining proper pitch in concert. Although they did not want to confront him about it for fear of "bruis[ing] his ego", they eventually convinced Roe of his problems by listening to concert recordings together. Roe also consulted unsuccessfully with vocal coaches and throat doctors at the Vanderbilt University Medical Center. The band attempted to cover up Roe's problems by removing certain songs from concert set lists, lowering the key on others, having Truman sometimes take the lead vocal, and using pitch correction software, but even these did not fully correct the issues. Finally, they consulted vocal coach Diane Sheets, a friend of Johnson's son-in-law. She determined that Roe was over-compensating for a small degree of hearing loss typical of musicians who have performed live for long periods of time, thus tightening muscles in his throat and diaphragm and causing him to lose pitch. Although Roe was initially "cynical" toward Sheets's coaching, she was ultimately successful in restoring his voice.

=== 2002–2007: Completely, Can't You Tell, and Greatest Hits II ===
In 2002, Diamond Rio released its seventh studio album, Completely. The band originally conceived it as a double album, featuring traditional country on one disc and more pop-oriented country on the other, but according to Prout, this concept did not fully materialize because "country music has blinders on as far as what's acceptable – and what isn't", although Olander and Williams noted that the idea allowed them "more leeway in choosing songs". In addition to earning a gold certification, it produced two consecutive No. 1 singles in "Beautiful Mess" and "I Believe", the latter being the band's last single to top Hot Country Songs. Third single "Wrinkles" made Top 20, while the last single, "We All Fall Down" (also written by Steven Dale Jones), failed to reach top 40. Two of the album's tracks were previously recorded by other artists: "Make Sure You've Got It All", written by Bill Anderson and Steve Wariner, was originally recorded on Collin Raye's 1998 album The Walls Came Down, and "If You'd Like Some Lovin'" by its co-writer, David Ball, on his 1996 album Starlite Lounge.

Rick Cohoon of Allmusic praised the album for its musical variety, saying, "With artists as well anchored in the business as Diamond Rio, the musical quality is a given. The real challenge is outdoing yourself and coming up with fresh concepts. The selections on this album seem to be the fruition of that search for musical renewal". He cited "Beautiful Mess" and "I Believe" as standout tracks. Ray Waddell of Billboard also thought that the singles were among the best tracks on the album, while highlighting the instrumental track "Rural Philharmonic" (which Olander had originally intended to record for a solo album) as an example of the band's strong musicianship. Chrissie Dickinson of the Chicago Tribune was less favorable, commending the "masterful musicianship" and Roe's "light vocal timbre", while criticizing the song selections as "mostly a paint-by-numbers trip around the musical block, from the predictable power balladry of 'I Believe' to the saccharine sentiments of 'We All Fall Down.'"

An eighth studio album, tentatively titled Can't You Tell, was recorded in 2003, but it was cancelled after its first two singles – the title track and "One Believer" – both failed to make Top 40 upon their releases in late 2004 and early 2005 respectively. Diamond Rio's second Greatest Hits package, Greatest Hits II, was released instead in 2006. Like their first Greatest Hits album, this compilation included several new songs as well as the band's greatest hits; one of these new songs, "God Only Cries", was released as a single, peaking at No. 30. Shortly after the album's release, Diamond Rio parted ways with Arista Nashville.

=== 2007–present: New record label, The Reason, and I Made It ===
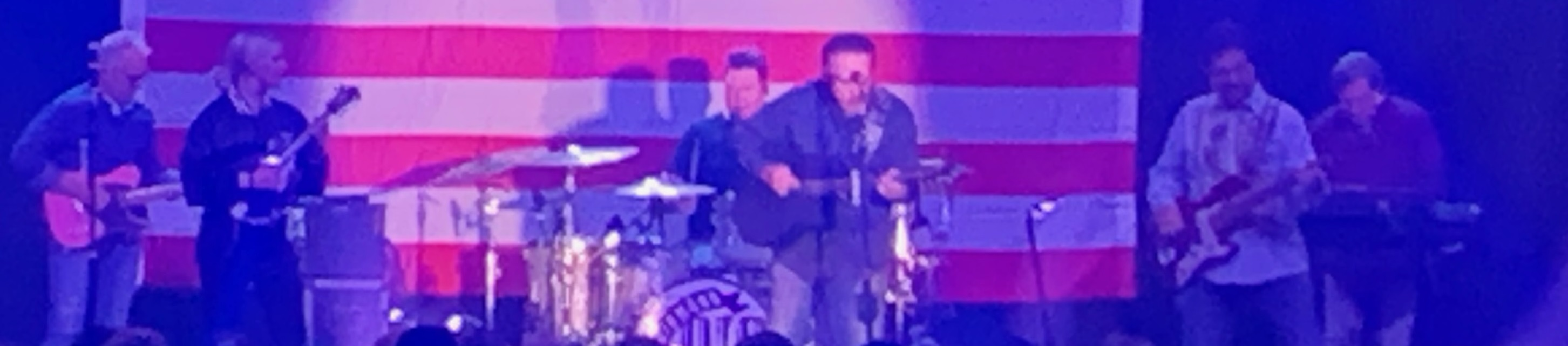
Diamond Rio performing in 2025.

On August 31, 2007, Diamond Rio signed with Word Records, a Christian music label based in Nashville. Their first album for Word was a Christmas album entitled A Diamond Rio Christmas: The Star Still Shines, which they recorded in Olander's basement studio. Roe said in an interview with CMT that "we just didn't try to copy anybody else. We tried to make up our own arrangements." The group released its first contemporary Christian album, The Reason, on September 22, 2009. It earned the band three Dove Award nominations: Song of the Year for "God Is There", Country Song of the Year for the title track, and Country Album of the Year.

In 2014, Olander told The Arizona Republic that the group was no longer signed to Word Records and planned to release new material independently. "I will say that I was proud of the material, but maybe it's not the best version of Diamond Rio," Olander told the publication. "We were kind of in a no-man's land. We didn't fit in with country radio and we didn't fit with Christian radio. It was something that wasn't fully realized." The band began releasing records independently, starting with a live album in 2014 and following in 2015 with the studio album I Made It.

Prout and Johnson both retired from the band in 2022. Micah Schweinsberg filled in on drums, and Carson McKee on harmony vocals, mandolin, and fiddle, for a series of concerts in 2022. Said tour, focused on songs from their 2007 Christmas album, was the band's first since before the COVID-19 pandemic. Schweinsberg and McKee both became official members of the band in mid-2023, making McKee the band's first female member. The first single following their addition to the lineup, an instrumental called "The Kick", was released soon after.

=== Outside contributions ===
Diamond Rio has been featured on several projects featuring multiple country artists, including three tribute albums released between 1993 and 1994. The first was a cover of the Eagles' 1975 hit "Lyin' Eyes" for Common Thread: The Songs of the Eagles, an album released in late 1993 via Giant Records which featured various country musicians covering that band's songs. Diamond Rio had originally wanted to record the song for Love a Little Stronger, but DuBois rejected the idea because he felt that they were not yet well-established enough to record a cover song on one of their own albums. The second was Keith Whitley: A Tribute Album, to which they contributed a cover of Keith Whitley's 1986 hit "Ten Feet Away", and the third was a cover of Merle Haggard's "Workin' Man Blues" for a tribute album entitled Mama's Hungry Eyes: A Tribute to Merle Haggard. This rendition, which featured guest appearances from Lee Roy Parnell and Steve Wariner (both of whom were also signed to Arista Nashville at the time), was credited to "Jed Zeppelin". The song peaked at No. 48 on the Billboard country charts from unsolicited airplay, and was made into a music video. In 1996, the band covered "Beauty and the Beast" for the multi-artist compilation The Best of Country Sing the Best of Disney and contributed the original song "Christmas Spirit" (which Powell and Roe co-wrote) to Star of Wonder: Country Christmas Collection, a Christmas album featuring various artists on Arista Nashville's roster. A year later, Diamond Rio contributed a recording of the gospel standard "Walkin' in Jerusalem" to a compilation entitled Peace in the Valley: A Country Music Journey Through Gospel Music. Diamond Rio and Collin Raye also sang backing vocals on Kenny Rogers' 2000 single "He Will, She Knows". In 2002, the band was featured on country parodist Cledus T. Judd's "Man of Constant Borrow", a parody of "Man of Constant Sorrow" on his album Cledus Envy. Jerrod Niemann's late-2017 album This Ride features Diamond Rio on the song "I Ain't All There".

Some of the individual members have also contributed to songs by other artists. Roe sang duet vocals with then-labelmate Pam Tillis on "Love Is Only Human", a cut from her 1992 album Homeward Looking Angel. Olander was featured along with bluegrass musicians Carl Jackson and Mark O'Connor on the track "Hap Towne Breakdowne" from Steve Wariner's 1996 instrumental album No More Mr. Nice Guy. He also co-wrote Kenny Chesney's 2001 single "I Lost It", Marshall Dyllon's 2001 single "You", and the track "The Night Before (Life Goes On)" from Carrie Underwood's 2005 debut album Some Hearts. Truman co-wrote Shane Minor's 1999 single "Ordinary Love"; Minor would later co-write the band's hit "Beautiful Mess". In 2003, Truman and songwriter Jason Deere co-founded the Nashville Tribute Band, which has recorded three albums for missionaries of the Church of Jesus Christ of Latter-day Saints, of which Truman is a member. Roe, Johnson, and Williams sang backing vocals on Josh Turner's 2006 single "Me and God" (from the album Your Man), which also featured a guest vocal from bluegrass musician Ralph Stanley.

== Musical stylings ==
In the country music industry particularly, record producers hire mostly session musicians to record instrumental tracks for an album for both solo artists and bands, as opposed to rock bands who record their own instrumental and vocal tracks on their albums. Diamond Rio has been one of few self-contained country bands to have followed the practice of each member playing their own instruments and singing their own vocals on all their albums themselves, without any additional input from outside musicians. The sole exception has been the inclusion of string sections on some of their later work, starting with "I Know How the River Feels" and continuing through certain tracks on One More Day and Completely. According to Prout, other labels had rejected the band prior to their signing with Arista Nashville due to the band members' insistence that they play all their own instruments.

Their early music blended neotraditionalist country with occasional traces of country rock, primarily in the song's prominent rhythm sections. A bluegrass influence has also been shown, primarily in the three-part harmonies among Roe (lead), Williams (baritone), and Johnson (tenor). Bluegrass influences are also shown in the band's prominent use of the mandolin, as well as in the instrumentals featured on many of their earlier albums. The band's later material has tended towards pop-oriented ballads, such as "I Believe" and "One More Day" – songs which received critical acclaim for their often religious-themed messages, but were considered departures from the more traditional material of their first four albums.

Another trademark of Diamond Rio's sound is the custom-built B-Bender guitar played by Olander. He refers to this instrument as the "Taxicaster" because of its yellow body and black-and-white checkered pickguard, which give it the coloration of a taxicab.

== Awards ==
Diamond Rio received the Academy of Country Music's award for Top Vocal Group in 1991 and 1992. In 1992, 1993, 1994, and 1997, they also received the Country Music Association's award for Vocal Group of the Year (an award for which they received fifteen total nominations, more than any other country music group). In addition, Diamond Rio has received thirteen Grammy Award nominations. In 2010 they received three nominations for the GMA Dove Awards, and on April 22 won the award for Country Album of the Year. In 2011, they received their first Grammy Award in the Grammy Award for Best Southern, Country or Bluegrass Gospel Album category for The Reason.

Year	Association	Category	Nominated work	Result
1991	Country Music Association	Vocal Group of the Year	—N/a	Nominated
1991	Grammy Awards	Best Country Performance by a Duo or Group with Vocal	"Meet in the Middle"	Nominated
1991	Grammy Awards	Best Country Instrumental Performance	"Poultry Promenade"	Nominated
1991	Academy of Country Music	Top New Vocal Duet or Group	—N/a	Nominated
1991	Academy of Country Music	Top Vocal Group	—N/a	Won
1992	Country Music Association	Vocal Group of the Year	—N/a	Won
1992	Academy of Country Music	Top Vocal Group	—N/a	Won
1993	Country Music Association	Vocal Group of the Year	—N/a	Won
1993	Grammy Awards	Best Country Performance by a Duo or Group with Vocal	"In a Week or Two"	Nominated
1993	Grammy Awards	Best Country Album	Common Thread: The Songs of the Eagles (with various artists)	Nominated
1993	Academy of Country Music	Top Vocal Group	—N/a	Nominated
1994	Country Music Association	Vocal Group of the Year	—N/a	Won
1994	Country Music Association	Album of the Year	Common Thread: The Songs of the Eagles (with various artists)	Won
1994	Grammy Awards	Best Country Instrumental Performance	"Appalachian Dream"	Nominated
1994	Academy of Country Music	Top Vocal Group	—N/a	Nominated
1995	Country Music Association	Vocal Group of the Year	—N/a	Nominated
1995	Country Music Association	Vocal Event of the Year	"Workin' Man's Blues" (with Lee Roy Parnell and Steve Wariner)	Nominated
1995	Academy of Country Music	Top Vocal Group	—N/a	Nominated
1996	Country Music Association	Vocal Group of the Year	—N/a	Nominated
1996	Grammy Awards	Best Country Performance by a Duo or Group with Vocal	"That's What I Get for Lovin' You"	Nominated
1996	Grammy Awards	Best Country Instrumental Performance	"Big"	Nominated
1997	Country Music Association	Vocal Group of the Year	—N/a	Won
1997	Grammy Awards	Best Country Performance by a Duo or Group with Vocal	"How Your Love Makes Me Feel"	Nominated
1997	Academy of Country Music	Single Record of the Year	"How Your Love Makes Me Feel"	Nominated
1997	Academy of Country Music	Video of the Year	"How Your Love Makes Me Feel"	Nominated
1997	Academy of Country Music	Top Vocal Duo/Group	—N/a	Nominated
1998	Country Music Association	Vocal Group of the Year	—N/a	Nominated
1999	Country Music Association	Vocal Group of the Year	—N/a	Nominated
1999	Grammy Awards	Best Country Performance by a Duo or Group with Vocal	"Unbelievable"	Nominated
2000	Country Music Association	Vocal Group of the Year	—N/a	Nominated
2000	Academy of Country Music	Top Vocal Group	—N/a	Nominated
2001	Country Music Association	Single of the Year	"One More Day"	Nominated
2001	Country Music Association	Vocal Group of the Year	—N/a	Nominated
2001	Grammy Awards	Best Country Performance by a Duo or Group with Vocal	"One More Day"	Nominated
2001	Grammy Awards	Best Country Album	One More Day	Nominated
2001	Academy of Country Music	Single Record of the Year	"One More Day"	Nominated
2001	Academy of Country Music	Song of the Year	"One More Day"	Nominated
2001	Academy of Country Music	Top Vocal Group	—N/a	Nominated
2002	Country Music Association	Vocal Group of the Year	—N/a	Nominated
2002	Grammy Awards	Best Country Performance by a Duo or Group with Vocal	"Beautiful Mess"	Nominated
2002	Academy of Country Music	Top Vocal Group	—N/a	Nominated
2003	Country Music Association	Vocal Group of the Year	—N/a	Nominated
2003	Grammy Awards	Best Country Performance by a Duo or Group with Vocal	"I Believe"	Nominated
2003	Academy of Country Music	Top Vocal Group	—N/a	Nominated
2004	Country Music Association	Vocal Group of the Year	—N/a	Nominated
2004	Academy of Country Music	Home Depot Humanitarian Award	—N/a	Nominated
2004	Academy of Country Music	Top Vocal Group	—N/a	Nominated
2005	Country Music Association	Vocal Group of the Year	—N/a	Nominated
2006	Academy of Country Music	Top Vocal Group	—N/a	Nominated
2011	Grammy Awards	Best Southern, Country or Bluegrass Gospel Album	The Reason	Won

== Personnel ==
=== Members ===
Current members

- Dan Truman – (born August 29, 1956; piano, keyboards) (1983–present)
- Marty Roe – (born December 28, 1960; lead vocals, rhythm guitar) (1984–present)
- Jimmy Olander – (born August 26, 1961; lead guitar, banjo) (1985–present)
- Dana Williams – (born May 22, 1961; bass guitar, baritone vocals) (1989–present)
- Carson McKee – mandolin, fiddle, tenor vocals (2022–present)
- Micah Schweinsberg– drums (2022–present)

Former members

- Larry Beard – lead guitar, fiddle, banjo (1982–1985)
- Al DeLeonibus – piano (1982–1983)
- Matt Davenport – bass guitar, lead vocals (1982–1988)
- Danny Gregg – rhythm guitar, lead vocals (1982–1986)
- Ty Herndon – vocals (1982–1983)
- Ed Mummert – drums (1982–1983)
- Jimmy "J. J." Whiteside – drums (1983–1985)
- Anthony Crawford – vocals (1983)
- Virgil True – vocals (1984)
- Brian Prout - drums (1985–2022)
- Gene Johnson – mandolin, fiddle, tenor vocals (1987–2022)

== Discography ==
- Diamond Rio (1991)
- Close to the Edge (1992)
- Love a Little Stronger (1994)
- IV (1996)
- Unbelievable (1998)
- One More Day (2001)
- Completely (2002)
- A Diamond Rio Christmas: The Star Still Shines (2007)
- The Reason (2009)
- I Made It (2015)

=== Billboard number-one hits ===
- "Meet in the Middle" (2 weeks, 1991)
- "How Your Love Makes Me Feel" (3 weeks, 1997)
- "One More Day" (2 weeks, 2000-2001)
- "Beautiful Mess" (2 weeks, 2002)
- "I Believe" (2 weeks, 2002-2003)
