= Oh Me, Oh My, Sweet Baby =

Song by George Strait

from the album Beyond the Blue Neon
- Released: February 6, 1989
- Genre: Country
- Length: 2:28
- Label: MCA
- Songwriters: Michael Garvin; Tom Shapiro
- Producers: Jimmy Bowen; George Strait

"Oh Me, Oh My, Sweet Baby" is a song written by Michael Garvin and Tom Shapiro. It was first recorded in 1989 by George Strait and featured on his album Beyond the Blue Neon.

== Diamond Rio version ==
"Oh Me, Oh My, Sweet Baby"

Single by Diamond Rio

from the album Close to the Edge
- B-side: "Nothing in This World"
- Released: March 15, 1993
- Recorded: 1992
- Genre: Country
- Length: 3:16
- Label: Arista Nashville 12464
- Songwriters: Michael Garvin, Tom Shapiro
- Producers: Monty Powell, Tim DuBois

Diamond Rio singles chronology
"In a Week or Two" (1992)	"Oh Me, Oh My, Sweet Baby" (1993)	"This Romeo Ain't Got Julie Yet" (1993)

It was later recorded and released as a single by American country music group Diamond Rio. It was released in March 1993 as the second single from their album Close to the Edge. It peaked at number 5 in the United States, and number 8 in Canada. In 1997, Eddie Blazonczyk and The Versatones released a polka version of the song.

=== Chart performance ===
Chart (1993)	Peak position
Canada Country Singles (RPM)	8
US Hot Country Songs (Billboard)	5

=== Year-end charts ===
Chart (1993)	Position
Canada Country Tracks (RPM)	99
