= Completely (Diamond Rio album) =

Studio album by Diamond Rio
- Released: July 23, 2002
- Studios: Cartee Day Studios, Emerald Sound Studios and Ocean Way Nashville (Nashville, Tennessee)
- Genre: Country
- Length: 46:39
- Label: Arista Nashville
- Producers: Mike Clute Diamond Rio

Diamond Rio chronology
One More Day (2001)	Completely (2002)	Greatest Hits II (2006)

Singles from Completely
- 1. "Beautiful Mess" Released: April 1, 2002; 2. "I Believe" Released: November 18, 2002; 3. "Wrinkles" Released: July 28, 2003; 4. "We All Fall Down" Released: December 2003

Professional ratings
Review scores
Source	Rating
About.com	(favorable)
Allmusic	3/5 stars
Chicago Tribune	(mixed)

Completely is the seventh studio album by American country music group Diamond Rio, released on July 23, 2002. Two of the album's singles, "Beautiful Mess" and "I Believe", reached number one on the Billboard U.S. Hot Country Singles & Tracks charts. Also released from this album were "Wrinkles" and "We All Fall Down", which peaked at numbers 18 and 45, respectively, on the country charts. The album was certified gold by the RIAA and reached number 23 on the Billboard 200, making it the band's most successful album on the chart. "Make Sure You've Got It All" was originally recorded by Collin Raye on his 1998 album The Walls Came Down. "If You'd Like Some Lovin'" was written and originally recorded by David Ball for his album, Starlite Lounge in 1996.

== Track listing ==
No.	Title	Writer(s)	Length
1.	"Beautiful Mess"	Sonny LeMaire, Clay Mills, Shane Minor	3:48
2.	"Big Ol' Fire"	Michael Lunn	3:06
3.	"I Believe"	Skip Ewing, Donny Kees	3:56
4.	"Something Cool"	L. David Lewis, Kim Williams	3:11
5.	"The Box"	Chris Wallin, Nicole Witt	3:17
6.	"We All Fall Down"	Arlis Albritton, Steven Dale Jones	4:08
7.	"Wrinkles"	Ronny Scaife, Neil Thrasher	3:09
8.	"Completely"	Diane Warren	3:47
9.	"A Better Idea"	Marty Dodson, Tom Shapiro	3:53
10.	"If You'd Like Some Lovin'"	David Ball, Tommy Polk	3:07
11.	"You'll Find Me"	Tommy Conners, D. Vincent Williams	3:47
12.	"Rural Philharmonic" (instrumental track)	Jimmy Olander	3:19
13.	"Make Sure You've Got It All"	Bill Anderson, Steve Wariner	4:11

== Personnel ==
Diamond Rio

- Marty Roe – lead vocals
- Dan Truman – keyboards, acoustic piano, Wurlitzer electric piano, Hammond B3 organ
- Jimmy Olander – acoustic guitars, electric guitars, 12-string guitar, Danelectro guitar, banjo, dobro, vibraphone, vocal pad
- Gene Johnson – mandolin, harmony vocals
- Dana Williams – bass, harmony vocals
- Brian Prout – drums

Guest musicians

- Carl Marsh – string arrangements and conductor
- The Nashville String Machine – strings

== Production ==
- Diamond Rio – producers
- Mike Clute – producer, recording, mixing, additional recording
- Steve Crowder – recording assistant
- Pete Miskinis – recording assistant
- Leslie Richter – recording assistant
- Benny Quinn – mastering at Masterfonics (Nashville, Tennessee)
- Astrid Herbold May – art direction, design
- Beth Lee – art direction, photography
- Keith Tucker – cover design
- Russ Harrington – photography
- Claudia Fowler – stylist
- Paula Jehle-Turner – grooming
- Colleen Runne – grooming
- Dreamcatcher Artist Management – management

== Charts ==
=== Weekly charts ===
Chart (2002)	Peak position
US Billboard 200	23
US Top Country Albums (Billboard)	3

=== Year-end charts ===
Chart (2002)	Position
Canadian Country Albums (Nielsen SoundScan)	70
US Top Country Albums (Billboard)	41
Chart (2003)	Position
US Top Country Albums (Billboard)	26

== Certifications ==
Certifications for Completely
Region	Certification	Certified units/sales
United States (RIAA)	Gold	500,000^{^}
^{^} Shipments figures based on certification alone.
