= Mama Don't Forget to Pray for Me =

Single by Diamond Rio

from the album Diamond Rio
- B-side: "Norma Jean Riley"
- Released: November 4, 1991
- Recorded: 1991
- Genre: Country
- Length: 4:12
- Label: Arista Nashville 2258
- Songwriters: Larry Cordle, Larry Shell
- Producers: Monty Powell, Tim DuBois

Diamond Rio singles chronology
"Mirror, Mirror" (1991)	"Mama Don't Forget to Pray for Me" (1991)	"Norma Jean Riley" (1992)

"Mama Don't Forget to Pray for Me" is a song written by Larry Cordle and Larry Shell, and recorded by American country music group Diamond Rio. It was released in November 1991 as the third single from their self-titled album. It peaked at number 9 in both the United States and Canada.

== Content ==
The narrator is having a hard time in his life, and asks his mother to not forget to pray for him.

== Music video ==
The music video was directed by Michael Merriman, and features the band playing at an airport and in a room somewhere.

== Chart performance ==
Chart (1991–1992)	Peak position
Canada Country Singles (RPM)	9
US Hot Country Songs (Billboard)	9

=== Year-end charts ===
Chart (1992)	Position
Canada Country Tracks (RPM)	79
