= Nowhere Bound =

Single by Diamond Rio

from the album Diamond Rio
- B-side: "They Don't Make Hearts (Like They Used To)"
- Released: June 29, 1992
- Recorded: 1991
- Genre: Country
- Length: 3:41
- Label: Arista Nashville 12441
- Songwriters: Monty Powell, Jule Medders
- Producers: Monty Powell, Tim DuBois

Diamond Rio singles chronology
"Norma Jean Riley" (1992)	"Nowhere Bound" (1992)	"In a Week or Two" (1992)

"Nowhere Bound" is a song written by Monty Powell and Jule Medders, and recorded by American country music group Diamond Rio. It was released in June 1992 as the fifth and final single from their self-titled album. It peaked at number 7 in the United States, and number 15 in Canada.

== Critical reception ==
Deborah Evans Price, of Billboard magazine reviewed the song favorably, saying that a "hooky and exceptionally entertaining guitar teases vocals throughout this number." She goes on to say that the band's performance, "coupled with the guitar chase delivers a winner."

== Music video ==
The music video was directed by Michael Merriman.

== Chart performance ==
Chart (1992)	Peak position
Canada Country Singles (RPM)	15
US Hot Country Songs (Billboard)	7

=== Year-end charts ===
Chart (1992)	Position
US Country Songs (Billboard)	65
