= Walkin' Away (Diamond Rio song) =

Single by Diamond Rio

from the album IV
- B-side: "It's All in Your Head"
- Released: November 27, 1995
- Recorded: 1995
- Genre: Country
- Length: 3:50
- Label: Arista Nashville
- Songwriters: Annie Roboff; Craig Wiseman
- Producers: Tim DuBois; Monty Powell; Michael D. Clute; Diamond Rio

Diamond Rio singles chronology
"Finish What We Started" (1995)	"Walkin' Away" (1995)	"That's What I Get for Lovin' You" (1996)

"Walkin' Away" is a song written by Annie Roboff and Craig Wiseman, and recorded by American country music group Diamond Rio. It was released in November 1995 as the lead-off single from the album IV.

== Content ==
In the song, the narrator pleads with his estranged lover by saying that just because he may lose his cool every now and then, their love is still good and that they will not get anywhere by walking away from each other.

== Music video ==
The music video, directed by Deaton-Flanigen, consists of alternating scenes of the band playing in a small warehouse and short scenes of the band-members and their "dates".

== Chart performance ==
The song entered the charts in early 1996 and peaked at number 2 on both The Billboard Hot Country Songs chart and Canada's RPM country chart.

Chart (1995–1996)	Peak position
Canada Country Singles (RPM)	2
US Hot Country Songs (Billboard)	2

=== Year-end charts ===
Chart (1996)	Position
Canada Country Tracks (RPM)	46
US Country Songs (Billboard)	27
