= I Know How the River Feels =

Single by Diamond Rio

from the album Unbelievable
- B-side: "What More Do You Want from Me"
- Released: March 29, 1999
- Genre: Country
- Length: 3:40
- Label: Arista Nashville
- Songwriters: Steven Dale Jones; Amy Powers
- Producers: Mike Clute; Diamond Rio

Diamond Rio singles chronology
"Unbelievable" (1998)	"I Know How the River Feels" (1999)	"Stuff" (2000)

"I Know How the River Feels" is a song written by Steven Dale Jones and Amy Powers. First recorded by Ty Herndon, it has been released as a single by both Diamond Rio and McAlyster.

== History ==
The song was originally recorded by Ty Herndon on his 1996 album Living in a Moment. Herndon said that he chose to record the song after a friend had died from cancer. Doug Johnson, then the senior vice president of Epic Records, told Billboard, "I think there is magic in the way he delivers that song."

Diamond Rio then covered the song for their album Unbelievable, and released it as the album's third single in March 1999. It was the first song in the band's career to feature outside musicians; specifically, a string section.

A year later, McAlyster recorded a demo, which was submitted to MCA Nashville and released as the group's only single.

== Critical reception ==
Mikel Toombs of the San Diego Union-Tribune described Diamond Rio's version negatively in his review of the album, saying that "There's nothing too embarrassing here, save the anything-for-a-metaphor 'I Know How the River Feels'.

Billboard gave the McAlyster version a mixed review, calling it "a pretty song and a promising performance, but where it fits in the country format remains to be seen."

== Chart performance ==
=== Diamond Rio ===
"I Know How the River Feels" debuted at number 74 on the U.S. Billboard Hot Country Singles & Tracks for the week of March 27, 1999.

Chart (1999)	Peak position
Canada Country Singles (RPM)	28
US Hot Country Songs (Billboard)	33

=== McAlyster ===
Chart (2000)	Peak position
U.S. Hot Country Songs (Billboard)	69
