= Wrinkles (song) =

Single by Diamond Rio

from the album Completely
- Released: July 28, 2003
- Genre: Country
- Length: 3:09
- Label: Arista Nashville
- Songwriters: Neil Thrasher, Ronny Scaife
- Producers: Michael D. Clute, Diamond Rio

Diamond Rio singles chronology
"I Believe" (2002)	"Wrinkles" (2003)	"We All Fall Down" (2003)

"Wrinkles" is a song written by Neil Thrasher and Ronny Scaife, and recorded by American country music group Diamond Rio. It was released in July 2003 as the third single from the album Completely. The song reached number 16 on the Billboard Hot Country Singles & Tracks chart.

== Chart performance ==
"Wrinkles" debuted at number 44 on the U.S. Billboard Hot Country Singles & Tracks for the week of August 2, 2003.

Chart (2003)	Peak position
US Hot Country Songs (Billboard)	16
US Bubbling Under Hot 100 (Billboard)	7
