= It's All in Your Head (song) =

Single by Diamond Rio

from the album IV
- B-side: "Is That Asking Too Much"
- Released: August 19, 1996
- Recorded: 1996
- Genre: Country
- Length: 3:40
- Label: Arista Nashville 07822-13019
- Songwriters: Van Stephenson, Reese Wilson, Tony Martin
- Producers: Tim DuBois; Monty Powell; Michael D. Clute; Diamond Rio

Diamond Rio singles chronology
"That's What I Get for Lovin' You" (1996)	"It's All in Your Head" (1996)	"Holdin'" (1996)

"It's All in Your Head" is a song recorded by American country music group Diamond Rio. It was released in August 1996 as the third single from their album IV. It peaked at number 15 in the United States, and number 17 in Canada. The song was written by Van Stephenson, who was then a member of the country music band BlackHawk, Tony Martin and Reese Wilson.

== Content ==
The song describes a young male who has grown up suffering from the death of his parents. The boy's father was a preacher who anticipated an eventual apocalypse, and he died while having the spirit to take up a snake, and he was killed by it. The boy's father's last words to the boy were; "We never walked on the moon, Elvis ain't dead, you ain't going crazy, it's all in your head."

== Critical reception ==
Deborah Evans Price, of Billboard magazine reviewed the song favorably, calling the song "unique, with an infectious, swampy beat and intriguing lyric about a 'sidewalk soapbox preacher' on an unusual path to salvation". She went on to say that lead vocalist Marty Roe "tackles the lyric with a funky energy".

== Music video ==
The music video was directed by directing duo Deaton-Flanigen Productions. It describes most of the content, and shows the boy (revealed to be known as Gordon Wallace Poole) grown up being in a mental hospital. Martin Sheen plays the father (and the doctor in the mental hospital), and Sheen's son Ramon Estevez plays Gordon as an adult.

This video also features Melissa McBride, who later went on to play the character of Carol on The Walking Dead.

== Chart performance ==
"It's All in Your Head" debuted at number 70 on the U.S. Billboard Hot Country Singles & Tracks for the week of August 24, 1996.

Chart (1996)	Peak position
Canada Country Singles (RPM)	17
US Hot Country Songs (Billboard)	15
