= Imagine That (Diamond Rio song) =

Single by Diamond Rio

from the album Greatest Hits
- Released: November 3, 1997
- Recorded: 1997
- Genre: Country
- Length: 3:29
- Label: Arista Nashville
- Songwriters: Bryan White, Derek George, John Tirro
- Producers: Michael D. Clute, Diamond Rio

Diamond Rio singles chronology
"How Your Love Makes Me Feel" (1997)	"Imagine That" (1997)	"You're Gone" (1998)

"Imagine That'" is a song written by Bryan White, Derek George and John Tirro, and recorded by American country music group Diamond Rio. It was released in November 1997 as the second and final single from their Greatest Hits compilation album. It peaked at number 4 in both the United States and Canada.

On September 26, 2025, co-writer Bryan White released his own version of "Imagine That" as a single.

== Chart performance ==
Chart (1997–1998)	Peak position
Canada Country Singles (RPM)	4
US Hot Country Songs (Billboard)	4

=== Year-end charts ===
Chart (1998)	Position
US Country Songs (Billboard)	49
