= How Your Love Makes Me Feel =

Single by Diamond Rio

from the album Greatest Hits
- B-side: "Imagine That"
- Released: May 26, 1997
- Genre: Country
- Length: 4:04
- Label: Arista Nashville
- Songwriters: Trey Bruce; Max T. Barnes
- Producers: Michael Clute; Diamond Rio

Diamond Rio singles chronology
"Holdin'" (1996)	"How Your Love Makes Me Feel" (1997)	"Imagine That" (1997)

"How Your Love Makes Me Feel" is a song written by Trey Bruce and Max T. Barnes, and recorded by American country music group Diamond Rio that reached the top of the Billboard Hot Country Singles & Tracks chart. It was released in May 1997 as the first single from their Greatest Hits compilation album. Having held the Number One position for three weeks in the United States, it is the band's longest-lasting Number One hit. It became the band's second number one hit and their first since their debut single "Meet in the Middle" in 1991. It also reached number one in Canada.

== Content ==
In this song, the narrator, tells his significant other the unusual way her love makes him feel. The song is in the key of C Major, before transposing upward to D Major on the last repetition of the chorus. In the verses, the main chord progression is C-F-Am-G-C-G/B-F-Am-G, and in the chorus, the progression is C-D7-F-G7 five times.

== Critical reception ==
Larry Flick, of Billboard magazine reviewed the song favorably saying that Clute's "skilled production lets the band's ample musical talents shine on this positive tune." He goes on to say that the "sing-along chorus will be a plus at country radio."

== Music video ==
The music video was directed by Deaton Flanigen and premiered on October 13, 1997 on CMT.

== Chart positions ==
"How Your Love Makes Me Feel" debuted at number 74 on the U.S. Billboard Hot Country Singles & Tracks for the week of June 7, 1997. The song reached number one on September 27, 1997 and remained there for three consecutive weeks until it was knocked off by "How Do I Get There" by Deana Carter.

Chart (1997)	Peak position
Canada Country Singles (RPM)	1
US Hot Country Songs (Billboard)	1

=== Year-end charts ===
Chart (1997)	Position
Canada Country Tracks (RPM)	11
US Country Songs (Billboard)	5
