= Mirror, Mirror (Diamond Rio song) =

Single by Diamond Rio

from the album Diamond Rio
- B-side: "The Ballad of Conley and Billy"
- Released: July 1, 1991
- Recorded: 1990
- Genre: Country
- Length: 3:12
- Label: Arista Nashville 2262
- Songwriters: Bob DiPiero, John Jarrard, Mark D. Sanders
- Producers: Monty Powell, Tim DuBois

Diamond Rio singles chronology
"Meet in the Middle" (1991)	"Mirror, Mirror" (1991)	"Mama Don't Forget to Pray for Me" (1991)

"Mirror, Mirror" is a song written by Bob DiPiero, John Jarrard and Mark D. Sanders and recorded by American country music group Diamond Rio. It was released in July 1991 as the second single from their self-titled album. It peaked at number 3 in the United States, and number 4 in Canada.

== Music video ==
The music video was directed by Michael Merriman, and features the band playing in a room full of mirrors so as to somewhat match the song's concept.

== Chart performance ==
Chart (1991)	Peak position
Canada Country Singles (RPM)	4
US Hot Country Songs (Billboard)	3

=== Year-end charts ===
Chart (1991)	Position
Canada Country Tracks (RPM)	49
US Country Songs (Billboard)	38
