= In a Week or Two =

Single by Diamond Rio

from the album Close to the Edge
- B-side: "Close to the Edge"
- Released: November 2, 1992
- Recorded: 1992
- Genre: Country
- Length: 3:00
- Label: Arista Nashville
- Songwriters: James House, Gary Burr
- Producers: Tim DuBois, Monty Powell

Diamond Rio singles chronology
"Nowhere Bound" (1992)	"In a Week or Two" (1992)	"Oh Me, Oh My, Sweet Baby" (1993)

"In a Week or Two" is a song written by James House and Gary Burr, and recorded by American country music group Diamond Rio. It was released in November 1992 as the lead-off single from their album Close to the Edge. It peaked at number 2 in the United States, and number 3 in Canada.

== Content ==
The narrator tells his former lover that he was going to give her everything in a week or two after the time that they had broken up.

== Music video ==
The music video was directed by John Lloyd Miller, and features lead singer Marty Roe sitting in a motel room surrounded by a bunch of stacked up television sets showing the band performing the song, and his former lover. The storyline of the video seems to indicate that he has lost his lover. However, at the end, he was evidently just dreaming as his bandmate, bassist Dana Williams, comes in the motel room and tells Roe to hurry up because it's time for his wedding, meaning that he and his lover never really broke up. It premiered nationally on October 26, 1992 on CMT.

== Chart performance ==
Chart (1992–1993)	Peak position
Canada Country Singles (RPM)	3
US Hot Country Songs (Billboard)	2

=== Year-end charts ===
Chart (1993)	Position
Canada Country Tracks (RPM)	67
US Country Songs (Billboard)	43
