= I Believe (Diamond Rio song) =

Single by Diamond Rio

from the album Completely
- Released: November 18, 2002
- Genre: Country
- Length: 3:57 (album version); 3:33 (radio version)
- Label: Arista Nashville
- Songwriters: Skip Ewing; Donny Kees
- Producers: Diamond Rio; Michael Clute

Diamond Rio singles chronology
"Beautiful Mess" (2002)	"I Believe" (2002)	"Wrinkles" (2003)

"I Believe" is a song written by Skip Ewing and Donny Kees, and recorded by American country music band Diamond Rio. It was released in November 2002 as the second single from their album Completely. The song became Diamond Rio's fifth and final No. 1 single on the Billboard Country Songs chart in 2003.

== Music video ==
The song's music video takes place in an area where many bad incidents are happening and a man is coping with losing his wife by finding comfort in angels. But at the end, she awakens. It was directed and produced by Deaton Flanigen and premiered on November 20, 2002 on CMT as part of CMT's Most Wanted Live.

== Chart performance ==
This song debuted at No. 58 on the Billboard Country Songs chart dated November 23, 2002. The song climbed to No. 1 on the chart dated May 31, 2003, where it held for 2 weeks, marking the group's fifth and final No. 1 single. The song also peaked at No. 31 on the Billboard Hot 100.

Chart (2002–2003)	Peak position
US Billboard Hot 100	31
US Hot Country Songs (Billboard)	1

=== Year-end charts ===
Chart (2003)	Position
US Country Songs (Billboard)	7
