= Beautiful Mess (Diamond Rio song) =

Single by Diamond Rio

from the album Completely
- Released: April 1, 2002
- Genre: Country
- Length: 3:48 (album version); 3:38 (single version)
- Label: Arista Nashville
- Songwriters: Sonny LeMaire, Clay Mills, Shane Minor
- Producers: Diamond Rio, Mike Clute

Diamond Rio singles chronology
"That's Just That" (2001)	"Beautiful Mess" (2002)	"I Believe" (2002)

"Beautiful Mess" is a song written by Shane Minor, Clay Mills and Exile bassist Sonny LeMaire, and recorded by American country music group Diamond Rio. It was released in April 2002 as the first single from Diamond Rio's album Completely. The song reached Number One on the Billboard Hot Country Singles & Tracks (now Hot Country Songs) charts, a position that it held for two non-consecutive weeks. The song was also Diamond Rio's most successful crossover single, peaking at number 28 on the US Billboard Hot 100.

== Content ==
Diamond Rio "Beautiful Mess"
22 second sample from Diamond Rio's "Beautiful Mess".

The song is a mid-tempo in which the narrator describes how his life has changed since he fell in love. He describes himself as "going out of [his] mind" and unable to concentrate — for example, appearing tired at work, accidentally putting salt in his coffee, "walkin' 'round in a haze", and "put[ting] [his] shoes on the wrong feet". Ultimately, he calls his state of mind a "beautiful mess".

I think it is a different sounding song for us, even along the lines of Jimmy’s guitar, a type of guitar we have never had in a song (Gretsch Guitar). AND every woman we played it for thought it was a sexy song, and we for sure have never had one of those before...it made us like it even more. - Dana Williams, bassist

== Critical reception ==
Chuck Taylor, of Billboard magazine reviewed the song favorably saying that "reverb-drenched guitar, a smoldering melody, and the barely contained pathos in the vocal highlight this next slice of excellence." Taylor said the "well-rendered backup vocals" and the good production give depth to the song.

== Music video ==
The music video was directed by Deaton Flanigen and premiered on CMT on May 31, 2002. The main female character was played by model Heather Green. It was filmed at the Nashville International Airport.

== Charts ==
"Beautiful Mess" debuted at number 55 on the U.S. Billboard Hot Country Singles & Tracks chart for the week of April 13, 2002. "Beautiful Mess" reached its peak of number one on the Hot Country Singles & Tracks chart on the chart week of September 28, 2002. One week later, it fell to the number two position with Tracy Byrd's "Ten Rounds with Jose Cuervo" overtaking it at the top. "Beautiful Mess" then returned to the number one spot on the chart dated for October 12, accounting for a second and final week in that peak.

Chart (2002)	Peak position
US Hot Country Songs (Billboard)	1
US Billboard Hot 100	28

=== Year-end charts ===
Chart (2002)	Position
US Country Songs (Billboard)	8

== Certifications ==
Certifications for Beautiful Mess
Region	Certification	Certified units/sales
United States (RIAA)	Platinum	1,000,000^{‡}
^{‡} Sales+streaming figures based on certification alone.
