= Unbelievable (Diamond Rio song) =

Single by Diamond Rio

from the album Unbelievable
- B-side: "You're Gone"
- Released: October 19, 1998
- Genre: Country
- Length: 2:21
- Label: Arista Nashville 13138
- Songwriters: Al Anderson; Jeffrey Steele
- Producers: Diamond Rio; Mike Clute

Diamond Rio singles chronology
"You're Gone" (1998)	"Unbelievable" (1998)	"I Know How the River Feels" (1999)

"Unbelievable" is a song written by Jeffrey Steele and Al Anderson, and recorded by American country music band Diamond Rio. It was released in October 1998 as the second single and title track from their album also titled Unbelievable.

The song was Diamond Rio's 21st single on the country music charts, and their first entry on the Billboard Hot 100.

== Critical reception ==
Deborah Evans Price, of Billboard magazine reviewed the song favorably saying that the lyric is fun and the track "sparkles with the band's musicianship, from the frisky piano to the infectious guitar work." She also says that "one has to admire lead vocalist Marty Roe's ability to deliver the rapid-fire chorus without missing a syllable.

== Music video ==
The music video was directed by Deaton Flanigen and premiered on September 10, 1998 on CMT.

== Chart positions ==
"Unbelievable" debuted at number 51 on the U.S. Billboard Hot Country Singles & Tracks for the week of October 31, 1998. It would later reach number 2 on that chart.

Chart (1998–1999)	Peak position
Canada Country Singles (RPM)	1
US Billboard Hot 100	36
US Hot Country Songs (Billboard)	2

=== Year-end charts ===
Chart (1999)	Position
Canada Country Tracks (RPM)	26
US Country Songs (Billboard)	10

== Parodies ==
- On his 1999 album Juddmental, country music parodist Cledus T. Judd parodied the song as "She's Inflatable" (referring to an inflatable sex doll).
