= Norma Jean Riley =

Single by Diamond Rio

from the album Diamond Rio
- B-side: "Pick Me Up"
- Released: March 23, 1992
- Recorded: 1991
- Genre: Country
- Length: 3:06
- Label: Arista Nashville 12407
- Songwriters: Rob Honey; Monty Powell; Dan Truman
- Producers: Tim DuBois; Monty Powell

Diamond Rio singles chronology
"Mama Don't Forget to Pray for Me" (1991)	"Norma Jean Riley" (1992)	"Nowhere Bound" (1992)

"Norma Jean Riley" is a song written by Rob Honey, Monty Powell and Dan Truman, and recorded by American country music group Diamond Rio. It was released on March 23, 1992 as the fourth single from their self-titled album. Unlike the four other singles released from the album, a music video was not made for this song.

== Content ==
"Norma Jean Riley" is a very upbeat, bluegrass influenced song where the narrator is pining for Norma Jean Riley's affections. In each verse, he comes up with different ways to get her attention. By the time the song is over, he is planning to propose to her.

The song was originally titled "Pretty Little Lady" until co-writer and producer Monty Powell suggested that song would be improved if the female focus had a name.

== Chart performance ==
The song peaked at number 2 on The Billboard Hot Country Songs chart and number 3 on Canada's RPM country chart.

Chart (1992)	Peak position
Canada Country Singles (RPM)	3
US Hot Country Songs (Billboard)	2

=== Year-end charts ===
Chart (1992)	Position
Canada Country Tracks (RPM)	40
US Country Songs (Billboard)	34
