= Meet in the Middle =

Single by Diamond Rio

from the album Diamond Rio
- B-side: "The Ballad of Conley and Billy"
- Released: February 6, 1991
- Recorded: 1990
- Genre: Country
- Length: 3:20
- Label: Arista Nashville 2182
- Songwriters: Chapin Hartford, Jim Foster, Don Pfrimmer
- Producers: Monty Powell, Tim DuBois

Diamond Rio singles chronology
| "Meet in the Middle" (1991) | "Mirror, Mirror" (1991) |

"Meet in the Middle" is a song recorded by American country music band Diamond Rio. It was released in February 1991 as their debut single, and served as the first single in the album Diamond Rio. The single reached number one on the U.S. Billboard Hot Country Singles & Tracks charts, making Diamond Rio the first country music band in history to have its debut single reach number one. The song was written by Don Pfrimmer, Chapin Hartford and Jim Foster.

== Content ==
"Meet in the Middle" is a mid-tempo describing two people who learn how to "meet in the middle". In the first verse, they are friends who live far apart, and agree to meet at a tree between their houses. By the second verse, they are married (the ceremony taking place underneath said tree), and upon looking at the tree (now in their back yard), they are reminded to put their differences aside when they disagree.

The song features accompaniment from banjo and mandolin, with some Hammond organ flourishes.

== Music video ==
This was their first music video and it was directed by Eric Straton and premiered in early 1991.

== Legacy ==
Canadian country singer Brett Kissel sampled part of "Meet in the Middle" for his song "Slidin' Your Way" on his 2021 album What Is Life, calling the track "an ode to Diamond Rio".

== Chart positions ==
"Meet in the Middle" peaked at number one on the Billboard Hot Country Singles & Tracks (now Hot Country Songs) charts in mid-1991, making Diamond Rio the first country music band in history to have its debut single reach Number One. It would remain the band's only number one single until six years later, when they topped the chart again with "How Your Love Makes Me Feel".

| Chart (1991) | Peak position |
|---|---|
| Canada Country Singles (RPM) | 1 |
| US Hot Country Songs (Billboard) | 1 |

=== Year-end charts ===
| Chart (1991) | Position |
|---|---|
| Canada Country Tracks (RPM) | 46 |
| US Country Songs (Billboard) | 16 |

== Certifications ==
Certifications for Meet in the Middle
| Region | Certification | Certified units/sales |
|---|---|---|
| United States (RIAA) | 2× Platinum | 2,000,000^{‡} |
^{‡} Sales+streaming figures based on certification alone.
