= Holdin' =

1996 single by Diamond Rio

Single by Diamond Rio

from the album IV
- B-side: "She Sure Did Like to Run"
- Released: December 9, 1996
- Recorded: 1995
- Genre: Country
- Length: 3:12
- Label: Arista Nashville 13067
- Songwriters: Kelly Garrett; Craig Wiseman
- Producers: Tim DuBois; Michael D. Clute

Diamond Rio singles chronology
| "It's All in Your Head" (1996) | "Holdin'" (1996) | "How Your Love Makes Me Feel" (1997) |

"Holdin'" is a song written by Kelly Garrett and Craig Wiseman, and recorded by American country music group Diamond Rio. It was released in December 1996 as the fourth and final single from their album IV. It peaked at number 4 in the United States, and number 5 in Canada.

== Content ==
The first verse begins with two young lovers holding each other in the back of a car while their parents are at home worrying that they are going too fast. The second verse occurs after their wedding. They are struggling to make ends meet with house payments but they are still holding on to love. The final verse goes to the birth of their first baby. As they look at him in the cradle, they agree that the most important lesson that they can teach him is to keep "holdin', lovin', smilin', believin'."

== Critical reception ==
Larry Flick, of Billboard magazine reviewed the song favorably saying Diamond Rio delivers with a "hook-laden single about the joys and challenges of love." He says that Roe's vocals draws the listeners into the story and makes them care about the characters in the song. He also states that the "chorus is so contagious that they will instantly find themselves singing along."

== Chart performance ==
| Chart (1996–1997) | Peak position |
|---|---|
| Canada Country Singles (RPM) | 5 |
| US Hot Country Songs (Billboard) | 4 |

=== Year-end charts ===
| Chart (1997) | Position |
|---|---|
| Canada Country Tracks (RPM) | 45 |
| US Country Songs (Billboard) | 55 |
