= You're Gone (Diamond Rio song) =

Single by Diamond Rio

from the album Unbelievable
- Released: June 1, 1998
- Genre: Country
- Length: 3:59 (album version); 3:31 (radio edit)
- Label: Arista Nashville
- Songwriters: Jon Vezner, Paul Williams
- Producers: Michael Clute, Diamond Rio

Diamond Rio singles chronology
| "Imagine That" (1998) | "You're Gone" (1998) | "Unbelievable" (1998) |

Music video
- "You're Gone" on YouTube

"You're Gone" is a song written by Paul Williams and Jon Vezner, and recorded by American country music group Diamond Rio. It was released in June 1998, by Arista Nashville, as the lead-off single from their fifth studio album, Unbelievable (1998). It peaked at number four in the United States and number five in Canada, on the Country charts of both territories. The accompanying music video was directed by Peter Zavadil, and premiered in mid-1998.

== Content ==
According to co-writer Paul Williams, the song came about when he and Vezner were discussing the death of one of Williams' old friends, Tom Jans, as well as other people who influenced their lives.

It just seemed like what we should write about are the people who are no longer in our lives who had a positive effect on us. And it just poured out of us. The people that pass through our lives-we remember what they say to us, and we remember how they touch us. ~Paul Williams, 1998.

== Critical reception ==
Larry Flick from Billboard magazine wrote, "Jon Vezner and Paul Williams have written a song that grabs the listeners by the ears immediately with the opening lines I said hello I think I'm broken/And though I was only jokin'/It took me by surprise when you agreed/I was trying to be clever/For the life of me I never/Would have guessed how far the simple truth would lead. This is an incredible song, and Diamond Rio lead vocalist Marty Roe delivers the powerful poetry in a voice that perfectly conveys the complex emotions in the lyric. The production by the talented Mike Clute and the Rio boys is clean and uncluttered, letting the vocal and piano drive home the impact of the lyric. This is just the first single from a great new album that shows these guys plan to hang on to that Country Music Assn. vocal group trophy they recaptured last fall."

== Charts ==
=== Weekly charts ===
| Chart (1998) | Peak position |
|---|---|
| Canada Country Singles (RPM) | 5 |
| US Hot Country Songs (Billboard) | 4 |

=== Year-end charts ===
| Chart (1998) | Position |
|---|---|
| Canada Country Tracks (RPM) | 45 |
| US Country Songs (Billboard) | 39 |
