= Love a Little Stronger (song) =

Single by Diamond Rio

from the album Love a Little Stronger
- B-side: "It Does Get Better than This"
- Released: May 9, 1994
- Recorded: 1994
- Genre: Country
- Length: 3:43
- Label: Arista Nashville 12696
- Songwriters: Chuck Jones; Billy Crittenden; Gregory Swint
- Producers: Tim DuBois; Monty Powell; Michael D. Clute

Diamond Rio singles chronology
"Sawmill Road" (1994)	"Love a Little Stronger" (1994)	"Night Is Fallin' in My Heart" (1994)

"Love a Little Stronger" is a song written by Chuck Jones, Billy Crittenden and Gregory Swint, and recorded by American country music group Diamond Rio. It was released in May 1994 as the first single and title track and from their album Love a Little Stronger.

== Content ==
"Love a Little Stronger" was written by Chuck Jones, Gregory Swint and Billy Crittenden, who was a member of the band 4 Runner at the time. In it, the male narrator promises that he will try harder to save a flagging relationship.

== Critical reception ==
Deborah Evans Price, of Billboard magazine reviewed the song favorably, saying that Jimmy Olander's "wonderful, Tele-bending guitar work and the band's road-tightened harmonies drive this cool single home."

== Music video ==
The music video for "Love a Little Stronger" was made by Deaton-Flanigen Productions.

== Chart performance ==
The song peaked at number 2 on the Billboard country charts, behind "Be My Baby Tonight" by John Michael Montgomery and "Dreaming With My Eyes Open" by Clay Walker and number 6 on Canada's RPM country chart.

Chart (1994)	Peak position
Canada Country Singles (RPM)	6
US Hot Country Songs (Billboard)	2

=== Year-end charts ===
Chart (1994)	Position
Canada Country Tracks (RPM)	88
US Country Songs (Billboard)	9
