= Monty Powell =

American country music songwriter (born 1961)

- Born: June 1, 1961 (age 65); Resaca, Georgia, U.S.
- Origin: Nashville, Tennessee
- Genre: Country
- Occupations: Songwriter, record producer
- Years active: late 1980s-present

Monty Powell (born June 1, 1961) is an American country music songwriter best known for collaborating with Keith Urban, and for producing albums by Diamond Rio.

Powell's first songwriting credit was a jingle for an Allstate commercial. After moving to Nashville, Tennessee in the early 1990s, Powell wrote several songs for Diamond Rio, whose lead singer Marty Roe was a roommate of his while they were in college at Lipscomb University. Other artists who recorded Powell's songs include Tracy Byrd, Chris Cagle, Billy Ray Cyrus, Tim McGraw, Collin Raye, and Restless Heart. One of his first collaborations with Urban was his debut single, "It's a Love Thing", which reached Top 20 in 1999.

Powell won awards for Song, Songwriter, and Publisher of the Year in 2009 from SESAC. He also received a Country Music Association nomination in 2006 for co-writing Urban's "Tonight I Wanna Cry", and an Album of the Year award in 1994 for collaborating on Common Thread: The Songs of the Eagles.

Powell is the father of Suzannah Powell, who is known as the experimental rap artist Boyfriend.

Currently, alongside his wife Anna Wilson, Powell spends his time co-writing, producing and performing in a new band they have founded together called Troubadour 77, that pays homage to the 70s Laurel Canyon SoCal sound.

== Songwriting ==
- Selma Avenue / Troubadour 77
- Drive / Troubadour 77
- Steal Forever / Troubadour 77
- When We’re Gone / Troubadour 77
- For You / Keith Urban
- Miss Me Baby / Chris Cagle
- Days Go By / Be Here / Keith Urban
- Tonight I Want To Cry / Be Here/ Keith Urban
- She's Gotta Be / Keith Urban
- These Are The Days / Keith Urban
- Who Wouldn't Want To Be Me / Keith Urban
- It's A Love Thing / Keith Urban
- What A Beautiful Day / Chris Cagle
- I Love It When She Does That / Chris Cagle
- Night On The Country / Chris Cagle
- It Takes Two / Chris Cagle
- Growin’ Love / Chris Cagle
- Just Love Me / Chris Cagle
- Look At What I’ve Done / Chris Cagle
- Luckiest Man In The World / Neil McCoy
- I Am That Man / Brooks & Dunn
- When You Gonna Run To Me / Lee Ann Womack
- New York City Subway Rider / Anna Wilson
- It's Got Me / Anna Wilson
- Always The Same / Anna Wilson
- Could Have Been Me / Billy Ray Cyrus
- Words By Heart / Billy Ray Cyrus
- Let Me Be Wrong Again / Sons of the Desert
- Damn the Whiskey / Brad Martin
- Why Not Colorado / McBride &The Ride
- If A Man Ain’t Thinkin / Jerry Kilgore
- Radio Romance / Canyon
- Dancy’ Dream / Restless Heart
- Norma Jean Riley / Diamond Rio
- Nowhere Bound / Diamond Rio
- Finished What We Started / Diamond Rio
- They Don't Make Hearts Like They Used To / Diamond Rio
- The Ballad of Conley & Billy / Diamond Rio
- Pick Me Up / Diamond Rio
- Calling All Hearts / Diamond Rio
- Down By The Riverside / Diamond Rio
- I Was Meant To Be With You / Diamond Rio
- Kentucky Mine / Diamond Rio
- Old Weakness / Diamond Rio (
- I'll Go Down Loving You / Shenandoah
- The Love That We Lost / Chely Wright
- Cowboy Band / Billy Dean
- This Is Me Missing You / James House
- One Of These Days / Tim McGraw
- Pete's Music City / Alabama
- Straight and Narrow / Barbra Mandrell
- Straight and Narrow / Wild Rose
- My Kind of Girl / Collin Raye
- Love Lessons / Track Byrd
- The Chain Just Broke / Paulette Carlson
- Love Won / Ray Kennedy
- Easy Goin’ / Ray Kennedy
- Between a Rock and a Heartache / David Slater
- One of These Days / Marcus Hummon
- Straight As The Crow Flies / Marcus Hummon
- I Do / Marcus Hummon
- Brand New Me / Chad Brock
- That's Another Song / Bryan White
- Tender Moment / Oak Ridge Boys
- That Wasn't Me / Davis Daniel
- Someone Else's Tears / James Prosser
- Portrait Of An American Family / Dusty Drake
- I'm Not Afraid / Michelle Wright
- My Last Word / Kathy Mattea
- I Didn't Think It Would Hurt / Amanda Norman Sell
- Ten Paces, Turn Around / The Ministers
- Perpetual Emotion / The Ministers
- Crying In Paradise / The Ministers
- To Whom It May Concern / The Ministers
- With or Without Me / Jeff Wood
- He Said, She Said / Richie Havens/Anton Figg
- I'm Ready When You Are / Robert Ellis Orral
- Courage of Daniel / Wade Kimes
- Don't Let Go Of My Heart / Phil Keaggy
- Friday Night / Western Flyer
- Pieces/Rascal Flatts/ “Me and My Gang’
- Shine / Keith Urban / “Love
- Tu Compania / Keith Urban/
- Raise The Barn / Keith Urban
- You Don't Act Like My Woman / James Otto
- Damn Right / James Otto
- Sunset Man / James Otto
- All I Ever Wanted / Chuck Wicks
- Good Time Coming On / Chuck Wicks
- I'm Done / Jo Dee Messina
- Sweet Thing / Keith Urban
- Kiss A Girl /Keith Urban
- Till Summer Comes Around / Keith Urban
- She Goes All The Way / Rascal Flatts & Jamie Foxx
- As You Turn Away/Lady Antebellum
- If I Knew Then / Lady Antebellum
- Stars Tonight / Lady Antebellum
- When the Party's Over / Trent Tomlinson
- Hey Love / Better Than Ezra
- Fancy Things / Royal Bliss
- Into The Night / Royal Bliss
- Baby Just Hold On / Royal Bliss
- I Will Never Know/ Anna Wilson
- Faces of Love / Jeanette McCurdy
- Angels / Austin's Bridge
- Times Like These / Austin's Bridge
