= The Greatest Hits Collection II =

Greatest hits album by Brooks & Dunn
- Released: October 19, 2004
- Genre: Country
- Length: 63:04
- Label: Arista Nashville
- Producer: Various

Brooks & Dunn chronology
Red Dirt Road (2003)	The Greatest Hits Collection II (2004)	Hillbilly Deluxe (2005)

Singles from The Greatest Hits Collection II
- 1. "That's What It's All About" Released: July 12, 2004; 2. "It's Getting Better All the Time" Released: November 22, 2004

Professional ratings
Review scores
Source	Rating
AllMusic	4.5/5 stars

The Greatest Hits Collection II is the second compilation album by American country music duo Brooks & Dunn. It is the sequel to the duo's 1997 compilation The Greatest Hits Collection. It is also the second collection of the duo's most popular releases, chronicling their greatest hits from 1998's If You See Her, 2001's Steers & Stripes, and 2003's Red Dirt Road, omitting songs from 1999's Tight Rope. It also features one song from 1994's Waitin' on Sundown and one song from 1996's Borderline, both of which did not make it to the first compilation. Three new recorded tracks — "That's What It's All About", "It's Getting Better All The Time", and "Independent Trucker" — are also included on this compilation. These first two songs were released as singles, peaking at #2 and #1, respectively, on the Billboard Hot Country Songs chart. The CD version is currently out of print; however, it is available from digital and streaming services.

== Track listing ==
No.	Title	Writer(s)	Length
1.	"That's What It's All About"	Craig Wiseman, Steve McEwan	4:00 ^{A}
2.	"How Long Gone"	Shawn Camp, John Scott Sherrill	3:40
3.	"Ain't Nothing 'bout You"	Tom Shapiro, Rivers Rutherford	3:37
4.	"The Long Goodbye"	Ronan Keating, Paul Brady	4:25
5.	"My Heart Is Lost to You"	Brett Beavers, Connie Harrington	2:58
6.	"I Can't Get Over You"	Ronnie Dunn, Terry McBride	4:06
7.	"Red Dirt Road"	Kix Brooks, R. Dunn	4:20
8.	"Husbands and Wives"	Roger Miller	3:10
9.	"That's What She Gets for Loving Me"	R. Dunn, McBride	2:54
10.	"You Can't Take the Honky Tonk Out of the Girl"	Bob DiPiero, Bart Allmand	3:28
11.	"It's Getting Better All the Time"	Don Cook, Ronnie Bowman	4:14^{A}
12.	"Only in America"	Brooks, Ronnie Rogers, Cook	4:29
13.	"A Man This Lonely"	R. Dunn, Tommy Lee James	3:34
14.	"Independent Trucker"	Jeffrey Steele, Chris Stapleton	3:00 ^{B}
15.	"I'll Never Forgive My Heart"	R. Dunn, Janine Dunn, Dean Dillon	3:20
16.	"If You See Him/If You See Her" (featuring Reba McEntire)	James, McBride, Jennifer Kimball	3:58
17.	"South of Santa Fe"	Brooks, Paul Nelson, Larry Boone	3:51

^{A}New Recorded Tracks.

^{B}Previously Unreleased

== Personnel on new tracks ==
Brooks & Dunn

- Kix Brooks – lead vocals, background vocals
- Ronnie Dunn – lead vocals, background vocals

Additional musicians

- David Angell – violin
- Bekka Bramlett – background vocals
- Mike Brignardello – bass guitar
- Perry Coleman – background vocals
- J. T. Corenflos – electric guitar
- Chad Cromwell – drums
- Eric Darken – percussion
- David Davidson – violin
- Dan Dugmore – steel guitar
- Kim Fleming – background vocals
- Larry Franklin – fiddle, mandolin
- Kenny Greenberg – electric guitar
- Wes Hightower – background vocals
- Anthony LaMarchina – cello
- Steve Nathan – piano
- Sarighandi D. Reist – cello
- John Wesley Ryles – background vocals
- Crystal Taliefero – background vocals
- Kristin Wilkinson – string arrangements, viola
- John Willis – acoustic guitar, mandolin
- Glenn Worf – bass guitar
- Reese Wynans – Hammond organ, piano

== Chart performance ==
=== Weekly charts ===
Chart (2004)	Peak position
US Billboard 200	7
US Top Country Albums (Billboard)	2

=== Year-end charts ===
Chart (2004)	Position
US Top Country Albums (Billboard)	59
Chart (2005)	Position
US Billboard 200	154
US Top Country Albums (Billboard)	23

== Certifications ==
Region	Certification	Certified units/sales
United States (RIAA)	Platinum	1,000,000^{^}
^{^} Shipments figures based on certification alone.
