= 39th Academy of Country Music Awards =

US music awards ceremony in 2004

- Date: May 26, 2004
- Location: Michelob Ultra Arena, Las Vegas, Nevada
- Hosted by: Reba McEntire

Highlights
- Most wins: Toby Keith (4)
- Most nominations: Alan Jackson (7)

Television/radio coverage
- Network: CBS

The 39th Academy of Country Music Awards were held on May 26, 2004, at the Michelob Ultra Arena at the Mandalay Bay Resort & Casino in Paradise, Nevada. The ceremony was hosted by ACM Award winner, Reba McEntire.

== Winners and nominees ==
Winners are listed in bold.

Entertainer of the Year	Album of the Year
**Toby Keith**; Brooks & Dunn; Kenny Chesney; Alan Jackson; Tim McGraw	**Shock'n Y'all — Toby Keith**; Honkytonkville — George Strait; Martina — Martina McBride; Mud On the Tires — Brad Paisley; Red Dirt Road — Brooks & Dunn
Top Male Vocalist of the Year	Top Female Vocalist of the Year
**Toby Keith**; Kenny Chesney; Alan Jackson; Tim McGraw; Keith Urban	**Martina McBride**; Terri Clark; Sara Evans; Patty Loveless; Shania Twain
Top Vocal Group of the Year	Top Vocal Duo of the Year
**Rascal Flatts**; Alabama; Diamond Rio; Lonestar; Trick Pony	**Brooks & Dunn**; Blue Country; Montgomery Gentry; The Bellamy Brothers; The Warren Brothers
Single Record of the Year	Song of the Year
**"It's Five O'Clock Somewhere" — Alan Jackson (feat. Jimmy Buffett)**; "American Soldier" — Toby Keith; "Red Dirt Road" — Brooks & Dunn; "Remember When" — Alan Jackson; "Three Wooden Crosses" — Randy Travis	**"Three Wooden Crosses" — Doug Johnson, Kim Williams**; "It's Five O'Clock Somewhere" — Jim Brown, Donald Rollins; "Red Dirt Road" — Kix Brooks and Ronnie Dunn (Brooks & Dunn); "Remember When" — Alan Jackson; "There Goes My Life" — Wendell Mobley and Neil Thrasher
Top New Artist of the Year	Video of the Year
**Dierks Bentley**; Pat Green; Buddy Jewell; Josh Turner; Jimmy Wayne	**"Beer For My Horses" — Toby Keith, Willie Nelson**; "Celebrity" — Brad Paisley; "Concrete Angel" — Martina McBride; "Hurt" — Johnny Cash; "It's Five O'Clock Somewhere" — Alan Jackson (feat. Jimmy Buffett)
Vocal Event of the Year
**"It's Five O'Clock Somewhere" — Alan Jackson (feat. Jimmy Buffett)**; "How's The World Treating You" — James Taylor and Alison Krauss; "The Truth About Men" — Tracy Byrd, Andy Griggs, Blake Shelton and Montgomery Gentry; "Workin' for a Livin'" — Phil Vassar and Huey Lewis; "Young Man's Town" — Vince Gill and Emmylou Harris

== Performers ==
Performer(s)	Song(s)
Montgomery Gentry	"If You Ever Stop Loving Me"
Kenny Chesney; Uncle Kracker	"When the Sun Goes Down"
Brooks & Dunn	"That's What It's All About"
Toby Keith	"Whiskey Girl"
Rascal Flatts	"Mayberry"
Alan Jackson	"Remember When"
Terri Clark	"Girls Lie Too"
Willie Nelson; Toby Keith; Kenny Chensey	"Stay a Little Longer"
Martina McBride	"How Far"
George Strait	"Desperately"
LeAnn Rimes; Dan Tyminski	"Probably Wouldn't Be This Way"
Sara Evans	"Suds in the Bucket"
Brad Paisley; Alison Krauss	"Whiskey Lullaby"
Lonestar	"Let's Be Us Again"
Tim McGraw	"Live Like You Were Dying"
Loretta Lynn; Vince Gill	"Miss Being Mrs."
Keith Urban	"You'll Think of Me"
Gretchen Wilson; Big & Rich	"Redneck Woman" "Save a Horse (Ride a Cowboy)"
Reba McEntire	"Somebody"
Clint Black	"The Boogie Man"

== Presenters ==
Presenter(s)	Notes
Phil McGraw; Robin McGraw	Introduced Brooks & Dunn
Carrie Turner; Buddy Jewell	Top Vocal Duo of the Year
Marty Roe; Dana Williams	Teased Home Depot Humanitarian Award & Introduced Sterling Marlin
Sterling Marlin	Introduced Rascal Flatts
Josh Turner; Lance Burton	Single Record of the Year
Dierks Bentley; Sasha Alexander	Song of the Year
Jimmy Wayne; Penn & Teller	Album of the Year
Pat Green; Jaci Velasquez	Vocal Event of the Year
Eric Close; Kimberly Williams-Paisley	Introduced Sara Evans
The Warren Brothers; Julie Roberts	Video of the Year
Trick Pony	Introduced Brad Paisley & Alison Krauss
Joe Nichols; Kellie Coffey; Nancy O'Dell	Top New Artist of the Year
Jeff Foxworthy; Bill Engvall	Top Female Vocalist of the Year
Randy Travis; Michelle Stafford	Presented Home Depot Humanitarian Award for Martina McBride
Martina McBride; Kid Rock	Introduced Gretchen Wilson
Eddie George; Kevin Carter; Cledus T. Judd	Top Vocal Group of the Year
Emily Procter; Tracy Lawrence	Top Male Vocalist of the Year
Dwayne Johnson	Entertainer of the Year
