= Terry Bradshaw =

American football player and sports analyst (born 1948)

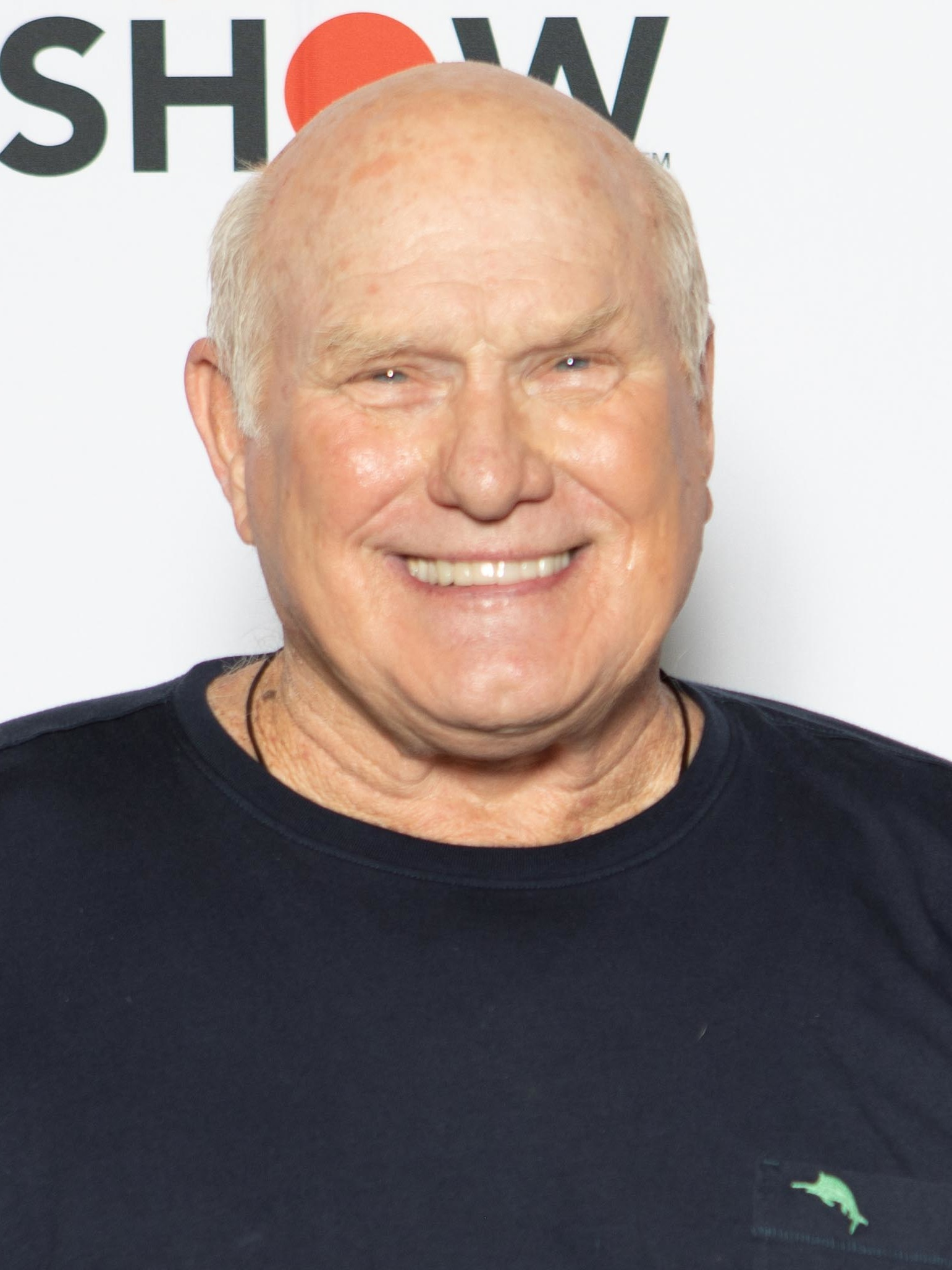
- Bradshaw in 2021

No. 12
- Position: Quarterback

Personal information
- Born: September 2, 1948 (age 78); Shreveport, Louisiana, U.S.
- Listed height: 6 ft 3 in (1.91 m)
- Listed weight: 215 lb (98 kg)

Career information
- High school: Woodlawn (Shreveport)
- College: Louisiana Tech (1966–1969)
- NFL draft: 1970: 1st round, 1st overall pick

Career history
- Pittsburgh Steelers (1970–1983)

Awards and highlights
- 4× Super Bowl champion (IX, X, XIII, XIV); 2× Super Bowl MVP (XIII, XIV); NFL Most Valuable Player (1978); First-team All-Pro (1978); 3× Pro Bowl (1975, 1978, 1979); 2× NFL passing touchdowns leader (1978, 1982); NFL 1970s All-Decade Team; Sports Illustrated Sportsperson of the Year (1979); Pittsburgh Steelers Hall of Honor; Pittsburgh Steelers All-Time Team; First-team Little All-American (1969)

Career NFL statistics
- Passing attempts: 3,901
- Passing completions: 2,025
- Completion percentage: 51.9%
- TD–INT: 212–210
- Passing yards: 27,989
- Passer rating: 70.9
- Rushing yards: 2,257
- Rushing touchdowns: 32
- Stats at Pro Football Reference
- Pro Football Hall of Fame
- College Football Hall of Fame

Terry Paxton Bradshaw (born September 2, 1948) is an American former professional football quarterback who played in the National Football League (NFL) for 14 seasons with the Pittsburgh Steelers. Since 1994, he has been a television sports analyst and co-host of Fox NFL Sunday. Bradshaw is also an actor and recording artist, having participated in several television shows (mainly as himself) and films, most notably co-starring in the movie Failure to Launch, and releasing several country music albums.

Nicknamed the Blonde Bomber, he won four Super Bowls in a six-year period (1974, 1975, 1978, and 1979), becoming the first quarterback to win three and four Super Bowls, and led the Steelers to eight AFC Central championships. He was inducted into the Pro Football Hall of Fame in 1989, his first year of eligibility, and the College Football Hall of Fame in 1996.

Bradshaw was known for being a tough competitor and having one of the most powerful arms in NFL history. His physical skills and on-the-field leadership played a major role in the Steelers' dynasty throughout the 1970s. During his career, he passed for more than 300 yards in a game seven times, but three of those performances came in the postseason (two of which were in Super Bowls). In four career Super Bowl appearances, he passed for 932 yards and nine touchdowns, both Super Bowl records at the time of his retirement. In 19 career postseason games, he completed 261 passes for 3,833 yards.

== Early life ==
Bradshaw was born in Shreveport, Louisiana, on September 2, 1948. His father, William Marvin "Bill" Bradshaw (1927–2014), a native of Sparta, Tennessee, was a veteran of the United States Navy, a former vice president of manufacturing of the Riley Beaird Company in Shreveport, and a Southern Baptist layman. His mother, Novis (née Gay; 1929–2023), was one of five children of Clifford and Lula Gay of Red River Parish, Louisiana. He has an older brother, Gary, and a younger brother, Craig.

In his early childhood, the family lived in Camanche, Iowa, where he set forth the goal to play professional football. When he was a teenager, Bradshaw returned with his family to Shreveport. There, he attended Woodlawn High School, played under assistant coach A. L. Williams, and led the Knights to the AAA state championship game in 1965, but lost 12–9 to the Sulphur Golden Tornadoes. While at Woodlawn, he set a national record for throwing the javelin at 245 feet (74.68 m); his exploits earned him a spot in the Sports Illustrated feature Faces in the Crowd. Bradshaw's successor as Woodlawn's starting quarterback was another future NFL standout, Joe Ferguson of the Buffalo Bills. Bradshaw's Steelers defeated Ferguson's Bills in a 1974 divisional playoff game.

== College career ==
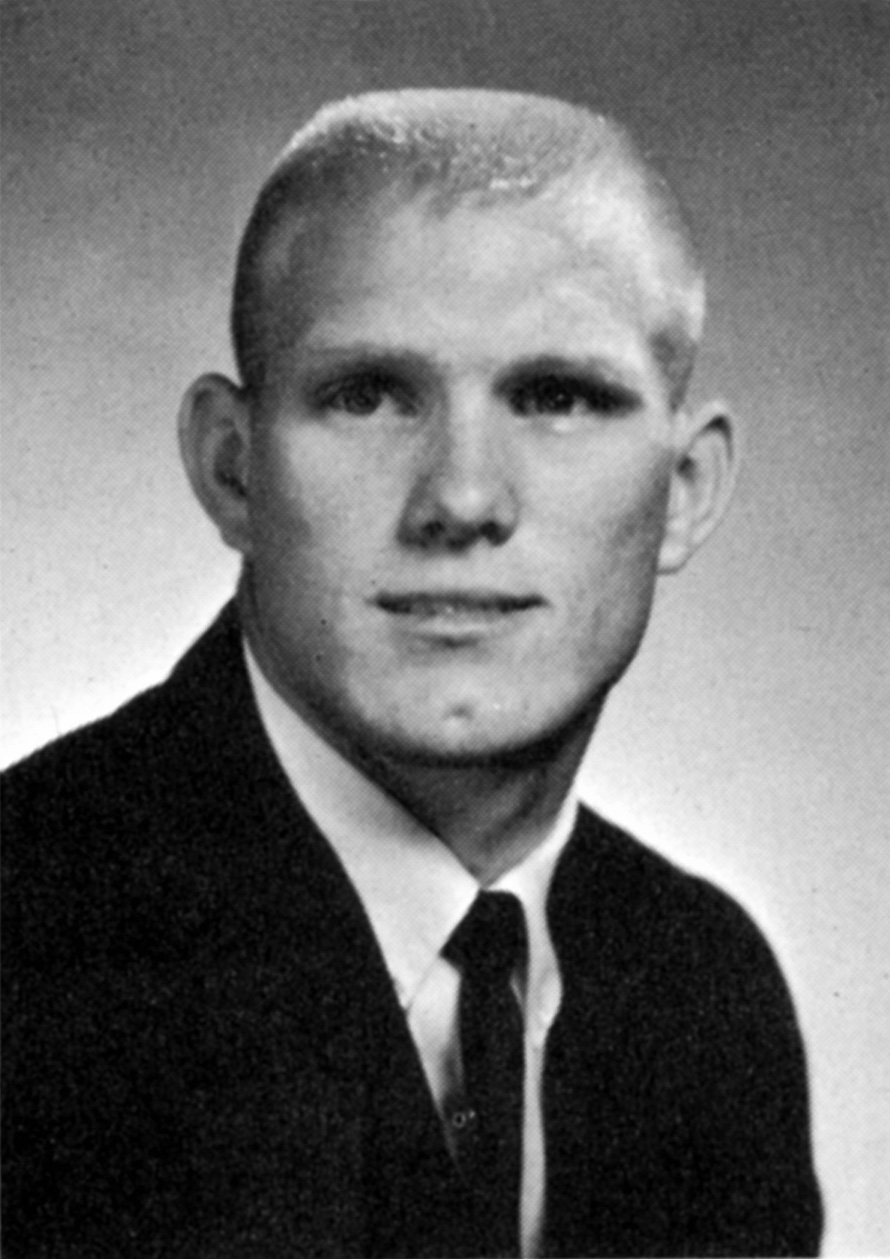
Bradshaw in 1967 at Louisiana Tech

Bradshaw decided to attend Louisiana Tech University in Ruston, recruited in part by future Hall of Fame coach Jimmy Johnson. He has much affinity for his alma mater, and is a member of the Tau Kappa Epsilon fraternity. Initially, he was second on the depth chart at quarterback behind Phil Robertson, who later became famous as the inventor of the Duck Commander duck call and television personality on the A&E program Duck Dynasty.

When he arrived at Tech in 1966, Bradshaw caused a media frenzy because of his reputation as a football sensation from nearby Shreveport. Robertson was a year ahead of Bradshaw, and was the starter for two seasons in 1966 and 1967, and chose not to play in 1968. As Robertson put it: "I'm going for the ducks, you [Terry] can go for the bucks."

In 1969, Bradshaw was considered by most professional scouts to be the most outstanding college football player in the nation. As a junior during the 1968 season, he amassed 2,890 total yards, ranking number one in the NCAA, and led his team to a 9–2 record and a 33–13 win over Akron in the Rice Bowl. In his senior season, he gained 2,314 yards, ranking third in the NCAA, and led his team to an 8–2 record. His decrease in production was mainly because his team played only 10 games that year, and he was taken out of several games in the second half because his team had built up huge leads.

Bradshaw graduated owning virtually all Louisiana Tech passing records at the time. In 1970, Bradshaw received the Golden Plate Award of the American Academy of Achievement. In 1984, he was inducted into the inaugural class of the Louisiana Tech sports hall of fame. Four years later, he was inducted into the state of Louisiana's sports hall of fame.

== Professional career ==
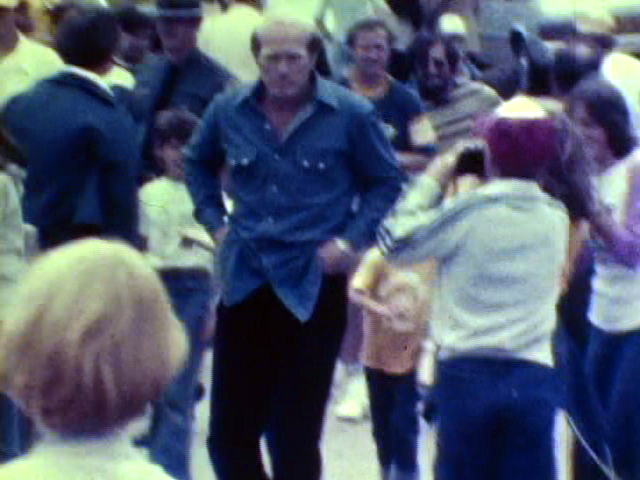
Bradshaw arriving at Steelers training camp

In the 1970 NFL draft, Bradshaw was selected as the first overall pick by the Pittsburgh Steelers, who got the first pick in the draft after winning a coin flip tiebreaker with the Chicago Bears since the teams had identical 1–13 records in 1969. Bradshaw was hailed at the time as the consensus number-one pick.

Bradshaw became a starter in his second season after splitting time with Terry Hanratty in his rookie campaign. During his first few seasons, the 6'3", 215-pound quarterback was erratic and threw many interceptions (he threw 210 interceptions over the course of his career), and was mocked by the media for his rural roots and perceived lack of intelligence.

Bradshaw took several seasons to adjust to the NFL, but he eventually led the Steelers to eight AFC Central championships and four Super Bowl titles. The Pittsburgh Steelers featured the "Steel Curtain" defense and a powerful running attack led by Franco Harris and Rocky Bleier, but Bradshaw's strong arm gave them the threat of the deep pass, helping to loosen opposing defenses. In 1972, he threw the "Immaculate Reception" pass to Franco Harris, among the most famous plays in NFL history, to beat the Raiders in the AFC Divisional playoffs.

Bradshaw temporarily lost the starting job to Joe Gilliam in 1974, but he took over again during the regular season. In the 1974 AFC Championship Game against the Oakland Raiders, his fourth-quarter touchdown pass to Lynn Swann proved to be the winning score in a 24–13 victory. In the Steelers' 16–6 Super Bowl IX victory over the Minnesota Vikings that followed, Bradshaw completed 9 of 14 passes and his fourth-quarter touchdown pass put the game out of reach and helped take the Steelers to their first Super Bowl victory.

In Super Bowl X following the 1975 season, Bradshaw threw for 209 yards, most of them to Swann, as the Steelers beat the Dallas Cowboys, 21–17. His late-fourth-quarter, 64-yard touchdown pass to Swann, released a split-second before defensive tackle Larry Cole flattened him, was selected by NFL Films as the "Greatest Throw of All Time".

Neck and wrist injuries in 1976 forced Bradshaw to miss four games. He was sharp in a 40–14 victory over the Baltimore Colts, completing 14 of 18 passes for 264 yards and three touchdowns and achieving the highest-possible passer rating of 158.3. As of 2022, it is the only playoff game where the visiting quarterback achieved this effort. With this outstanding game, he was not only instrumental in Pittsburgh's blowout win but also potentially—and inadvertently—helped save the lives of scores of people from the impact of a plane crash which took place soon after the game ended as result of the butterfly effect. This is because the Colts were beaten so badly that their fans left much earlier than they would have, with their supporter zone being completely vacated by time of the impact. There were no serious injuries, and the pilot was arrested for violating air safety regulations. Donald Kroner was the 33-year-old pilot charged with reckless flying, littering, and making a bomb threat against former Baltimore Colts linebacker Bill Pellington. Pellington owned a bar and restaurant from which Kroner was once ejected for using foul language. The crash is the subject of the 2022 documentary Section 1 by Secret Base's Jon Bois and Alex Rubenstein.

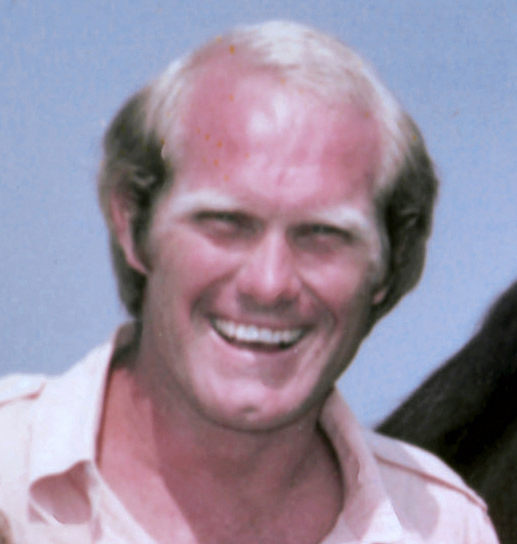
Bradshaw in 1979, the same year he won back-to-back Super Bowl MVPs (XIII & XIV)

However, the Steelers' hopes of a three-peat ended when both of their 1,000-yard rushers (Harris and Bleier) were injured in the win over the Colts, and the Steelers subsequently lost to the Oakland Raiders in the AFC Championship game, 24–7. Jack Lambert asserted that the 1976 Steelers team was the best team that he ever played on, including the four Super Bowl teams of which he was a part.

Bradshaw had his best season in 1978 when he was named the NFL's Most Valuable Player (MVP) by the Associated Press after a season in which he completed 207 of 368 passes for 2,915 yards and a league-leading 28 touchdown passes. He was also named All-Pro and All-AFC that year, despite throwing 20 interceptions.

Before Super Bowl XIII, a Steelers-Cowboys rematch, Cowboys linebacker Thomas "Hollywood" Henderson famously ridiculed Bradshaw by saying, "He couldn't spell 'cat' if you spotted him the 'c' and the 'a'." Bradshaw got his revenge by winning the Super Bowl MVP award, completing 17 of 30 passes for a then-record 318 yards and four touchdowns in a 35–31 win. Bradshaw has in later years made light of the ridicule with quips such as "it's football, not rocket science."

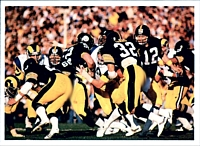
Bradshaw (12), hands the ball off to Franco Harris during Super Bowl XIV

Bradshaw won his second straight Super Bowl MVP award in 1979 in Super Bowl XIV. He passed for 309 yards and two touchdowns in a 31–19 win over the Los Angeles Rams. Early in the fourth quarter, with Pittsburgh down 19–17, Bradshaw again turned to the long pass to help engineer a victory: a 73-yard touchdown to John Stallworth. Bradshaw shared Sports Illustrated Sportsperson of the Year award that season with fellow Pittsburgh star Willie Stargell, whose Pirates won the 1979 World Series.

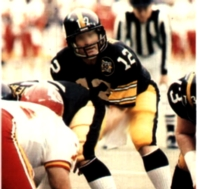
Bradshaw playing with the Steelers in 1982

After two seasons of missing the playoffs, Bradshaw played through pain—he needed a cortisone shot before every game because of an elbow injury sustained during training camp—in a strike-shortened 1982 NFL season. He still managed to tie for the most touchdown passes in the league with 17. In a 31–28 Wild Card Round loss to the San Diego Chargers, Bradshaw's last postseason game, he completed 28 of 39 passes for 325 yards, two touchdowns, and two interceptions.

In March 1983, Bradshaw underwent off-season elbow surgery. Hospital staff registered Bradshaw under the name of "Thomas Brady" to avoid the paparazzi (Bradshaw did not choose that name himself). Bradshaw was idle for the first 14 games of the 1983 NFL season. Then on December 10, 1983, against the New York Jets, he felt a pop in his elbow while throwing his final pass, a 10-yard touchdown to Calvin Sweeney in the second quarter of the Steelers' 34–7 win. Bradshaw later left the game and never played again. The two touchdowns Bradshaw threw in what was the final NFL game played at Shea Stadium (and the last NFL game played in New York City proper to date) allowed him to finish his career with two more touchdowns (212) than interceptions (210).

Bradshaw's retirement came as a surprise to some, and in hindsight unplanned on the Steelers' part. Before Bradshaw's elbow problems happened, the team chose to pass on Pitt quarterback Dan Marino in the 1983 NFL draft as an heir successor to Bradshaw due in part to head coach Chuck Noll wanting to rebuild on defense, and according to Bill Hillgrove, the Rooney family not wanting Marino to face a lot of pressure in his hometown and needing to experience life outside of Oakland, where Marino grew up and Pitt is located. The player the Steelers drafted instead (Gabriel Rivera) played only six games before becoming a quadriplegic following a drunk-driving crash, and Marino's subsequent success with the Miami Dolphins prompted Art Rooney to remind his sons daily until his death that the team "should've drafted Marino." The decision also set the franchise back at quarterback; while the team eventually returned to being a Super Bowl contender after their rebuilding period during the mid-1980s, they did not have a consistent quarterback until Ben Roethlisberger arrived in 2004.

Although the Steelers have not officially retired Bradshaw's number 12, they have not reissued it since his retirement.

== Career statistics ==
=== NFL ===
Legend
	AP NFL MVP
	Super Bowl MVP
	Won the Super Bowl
	NFL record
	Led the league
**Bold**	Career high

==== Regular season ====
Year	Team	Games			Passing									Rushing					Sacked		Fum
Year	Team	GP	GS	Record	Cmp	Att	Pct	Yds	Y/A	Lng	TD	Int	Rtg	Att	Yds	Y/A	Lng	TD	Sck	SckY	Fum
1970	PIT	13	8	3−5	83	218	38.1	1,410	6.5	**87**	6	24	30.4	32	233	**7.3**	22	1	25	242	3
1971	PIT	14	13	5−8	203	373	54.4	2,259	6.1	49	13	22	59.7	53	247	4.7	**39**	5	**33**	287	7
1972	PIT	14	14	11−3	147	308	47.7	1,887	6.1	78	12	12	64.1	**58**	**346**	6.0	20	**7**	29	237	4
1973	PIT	10	9	8−1	89	180	49.4	1,183	6.6	67	10	15	54.5	34	145	4.3	21	3	24	186	3
1974	PIT	8	7	5−2	67	148	45.3	785	5.3	56	7	8	55.2	34	224	6.6	34	2	10	104	1
1975	PIT	14	14	12−2	165	286	57.7	2,055	7.2	59	18	9	88.0	35	210	6.0	27	3	31	**290**	6
1976	PIT	10	8	4−4	92	192	47.9	1,177	6.1	50	10	9	65.4	31	219	7.1	17	3	16	164	7
1977	PIT	14	14	9−5	162	314	51.6	2,523	8.0	65T	17	19	71.4	31	171	5.5	26	3	26	235	10
1978	PIT	16	16	**14−2**	207	368	56.3	2,915	7.9	70	**28**	20	84.7	32	93	2.9	17	1	21	222	8
1979	PIT	16	16	12−4	**259**	**472**	54.9	**3,724**	7.9	65T	26	**25**	77.0	21	83	4.0	28	0	24	196	10
1980	PIT	15	15	9−6	218	424	51.4	3,339	7.9	68T	24	22	75.0	36	111	3.1	18	2	**33**	245	**13**
1981	PIT	14	14	8−6	201	370	54.3	2,887	7.8	**90T**	22	14	83.9	38	162	4.3	16	2	17	155	7
1982	PIT	9	9	6−3	127	240	52.9	1,768	7.4	74T	17	11	81.4	8	10	1.3	6	0	18	131	5
1983	PIT	1	1	1−0	5	8	**62.5**	77	**9.6**	24	2	0	**133.9**	1	3	3.0	3	0	0	0	0
Career		168	158	107−51	2,025	3,901	51.9	27,989	7.2	90T	212	210	70.9	444	2,257	5.1	39	32	307	2,694	84

==== Postseason ====
Year	Team	Games			Passing									Rushing					Sacked		Fum
Year	Team	GP	GS	Record	Cmp	Att	Pct	Yds	Y/A	Lng	TD	Int	Rtg	Att	Yds	Y/A	Lng	TD	Sck	SckY	Fum
1972	PIT	2	2	1–1	16	35	45.7	255	7.3	60	2	3	53.9	4	24	6.0	12	0	4	40	1
1973	PIT	1	1	0–1	12	25	48.0	167	6.7	26	2	3	57.0	3	9	3.0	5	0	1	9	0
1974	PIT	3	3	**3–0**	29	50	58.0	394	7.9	35	3	1	94.9	**14**	**82**	5.9	18	0	2	12	1
1975	PIT	3	3	**3–0**	32	57	56.1	527	9.2	64	3	**5**	68.4	9	60	6.7	16	**1**	**5**	**46**	1
1976	PIT	2	2	1–1	28	53	52.8	440	8.3	**76**	3	1	91.7	1	4	4.0	4	0	4	18	0
1977	PIT	1	1	0–1	19	37	51.4	177	4.8	48	1	3	40.0	4	21	5.3	11	**1**	0	0	0
1978	PIT	3	3	**3–0**	44	78	56.4	**790**	**10.1**	75	**8**	4	**104.1**	11	28	2.5	13	0	4	27	**7**
1979	PIT	3	3	**3–0**	**53**	**82**	64.6	758	9.2	73	6	4	98.5	4	34	**8.5**	**25**	0	4	32	0
1982	PIT	1	1	0–1	28	39	**71.8**	325	8.3	40	2	2	92.4	2	12	6.0	11	**1**	0	0	0
1983	PIT	0	0	did not play due to injury																	
Career		19	19	14–5	261	456	57.2	3,833	8.4	76	30	26	83.0	52	274	5.3	25	3	24	184	10

==== Super Bowl ====
Year	SB	Team	Opp.	Passing								Result
Year	SB	Team	Opp.	Cmp	Att	Pct	Yds	Y/A	TD	Int	Rtg	Result
1974	IX	PIT	MIN	9	14	64.3	96	6.9	1	0	108.0	**W** 16−6
1975	X	PIT	DAL	9	19	47.4	209	11.0	2	0	**122.5**	**W** 21−17
1978	XIII	PIT	DAL	**17**	**30**	56.7	**318**	10.6	**4**	1	119.2	**W** 35−31
1979	XIV	PIT	LAR	14	21	**66.7**	309	**14.7**	2	**3**	101.9	**W** 31−19
Career				49	84	58.3	932	11.1	9	4	112.7	W−L 4−0

=== College ===
Season	Team	Record	Passing								Rushing			
Season	Team	Record	Cmp	Att	Pct	Yds	Avg	TD	Int	Rtg	Att	Yds	Avg	TD
1966	Louisiana Tech	1−9	11	34	32.4	14	0.4	0	3	76.5	26	−74	−2.8	0
1967	Louisiana Tech	3−7	78	139	**56.1**	981	7.1	3	10	108.1	31	−118	−3.8	0
1968	Louisiana Tech	**9−2**	**176**	**339**	51.9	**2,890**	8.5	**22**	**15**	136.1	**87**	97	1.1	0
1969	Louisiana Tech	8−2	136	248	54.8	2,314	**9.3**	14	14	**140.6**	77	**177**	**2.2**	**11**
Totals		21−20	401	760	52.8	6,199	8.2	39	42	127.2	221	75	0.3	11

== Awards and honors ==
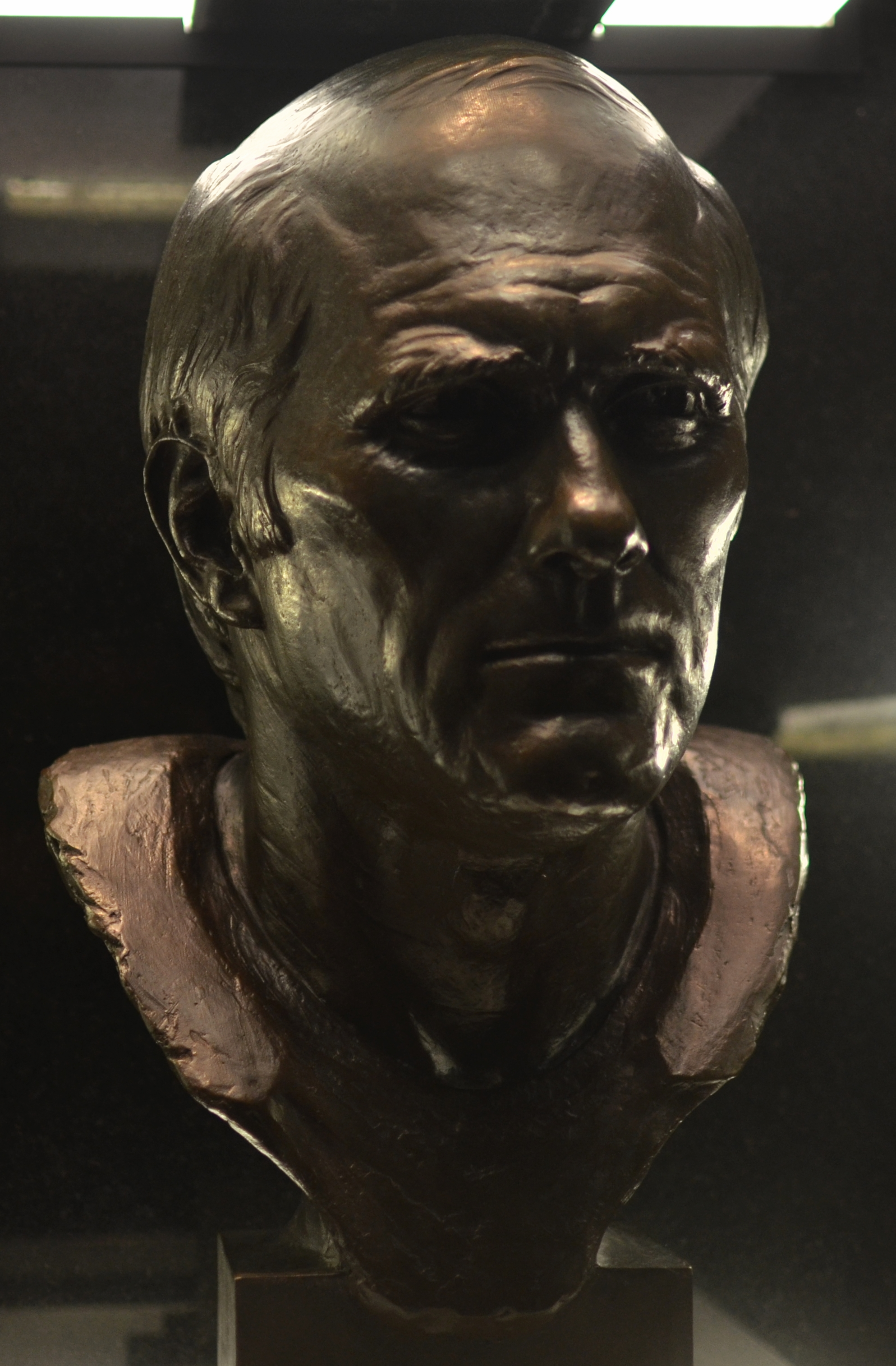
Bradshaw's bust at the Pro Football Hall of Fame.

NFL

- Four-time Super Bowl champion (IX, X, XIII, XIV)
- Two-time Super Bowl MVP (XIII, XIV)
- 1978 NFL MVP
- 1978 First Team All-Pro
- Three-time Pro Bowl selection
- NFL 1970s All-Decade Team
- No. 50 on The Top 100: NFL's Greatest Players

NCAA

- 1969 First-team Little All-American

Media

- 1979 Sports Illustrated Sportsman of the Year

Sports Emmy Awards

- Three-time winner - Outstanding Sports Personality, Studio and Sports Event Analyst

Halls of Fame

- Pro Football Hall of Fame (1989)
- Pittsburgh Steelers Hall of Honor
- Pittsburgh Pro Football Hall of Fame
- College Football Hall of Fame (1996)
- Louisiana Sports Hall of Fame (1988)
- Louisiana Tech Athletic Hall of Fame
- Star on the Hollywood Walk of Fame

== After football ==
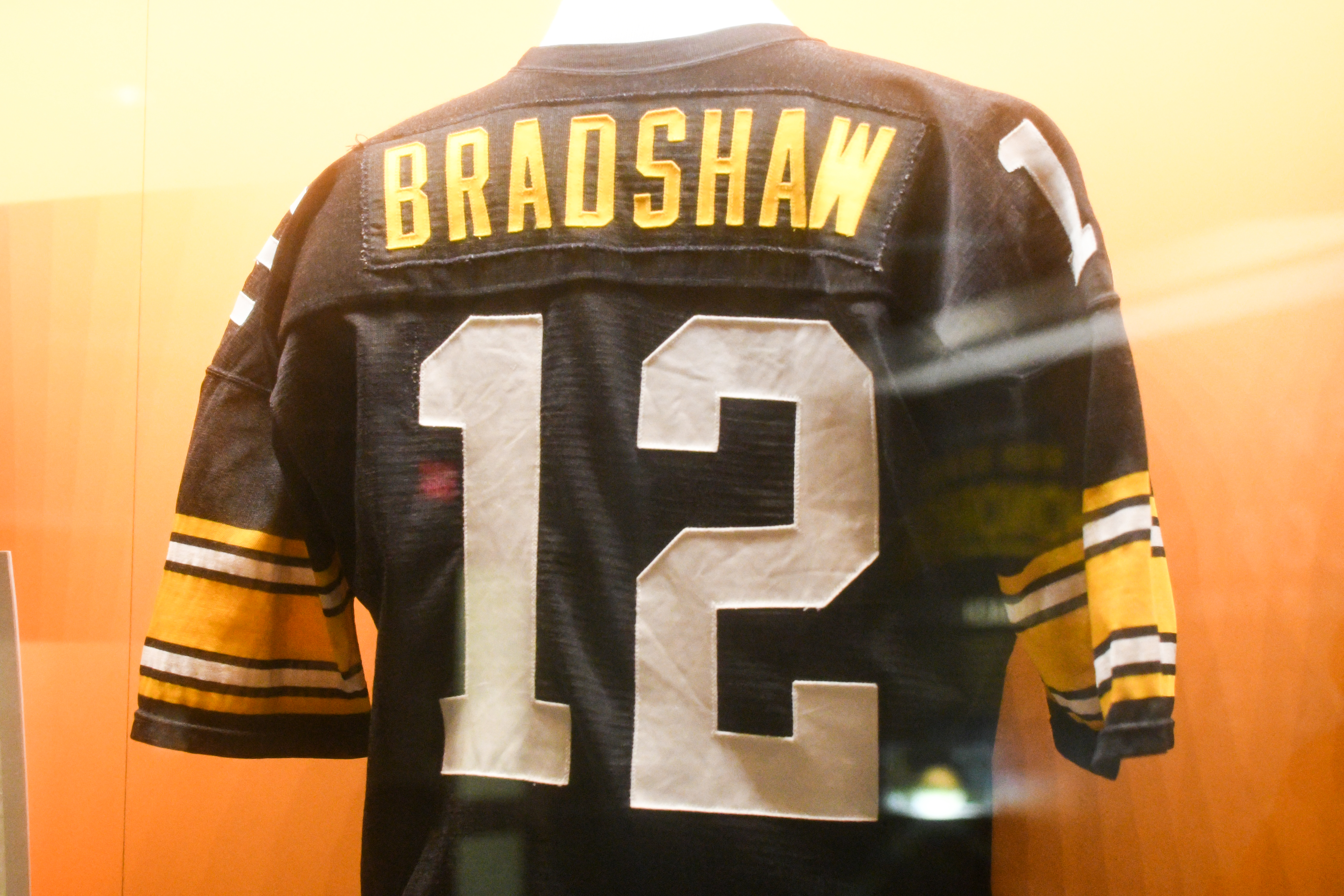
Bradshaw's uniform exhibited at the Pro Football Hall of Fame

Bradshaw was inducted into the Pro Football Hall of Fame in 1989.

In July 1997, Bradshaw served as the presenter when Mike Webster, his center on the Steelers' Super Bowl XIII and XIV title teams, was inducted into the Pro Football Hall of Fame.

In 2006, despite the Steelers being one of the teams playing in the game, Bradshaw did not attend a pregame celebration for past Super Bowl MVPs during Super Bowl XL in Detroit, Michigan. According to reports, Bradshaw (along with three-time MVP and close friend Joe Montana) requested a US$100,000 guarantee for his appearance in the Super Bowl MVP Parade, and associated appearances. The NFL could not guarantee that they would make that much, so refused. A representative for Bradshaw has since denied this report. After an appearance on The Tonight Show with Jay Leno (February 6, 2006), Bradshaw stated that the reason why he did not attend the MVP parade was that he was spending time with family, that he hates the crowds and the Super Bowl media circus, and also that the only way he would attend a Super Bowl is when Fox is broadcasting the game (ABC broadcast Super Bowl XL, which is that network's last such game to date), though Bradshaw attended several press conferences in Detroit days earlier. Bradshaw also stated that money was not an issue.

In April 2006, Bradshaw donated his four Super Bowl rings, College Football Hall of Fame ring, Pro Football Hall of Fame ring, Hall of Fame bust, four miniature replica Super Bowl trophies, a helmet, and jersey from one of his Super Bowl victories to his alma mater, Louisiana Tech.

On November 5, 2007, during a nationally televised Monday Night Football game, Bradshaw joined former teammates including Franco Harris and Joe Greene to accept their position on the Steelers' 75th Anniversary All-Time Team.

=== Broadcasting career ===
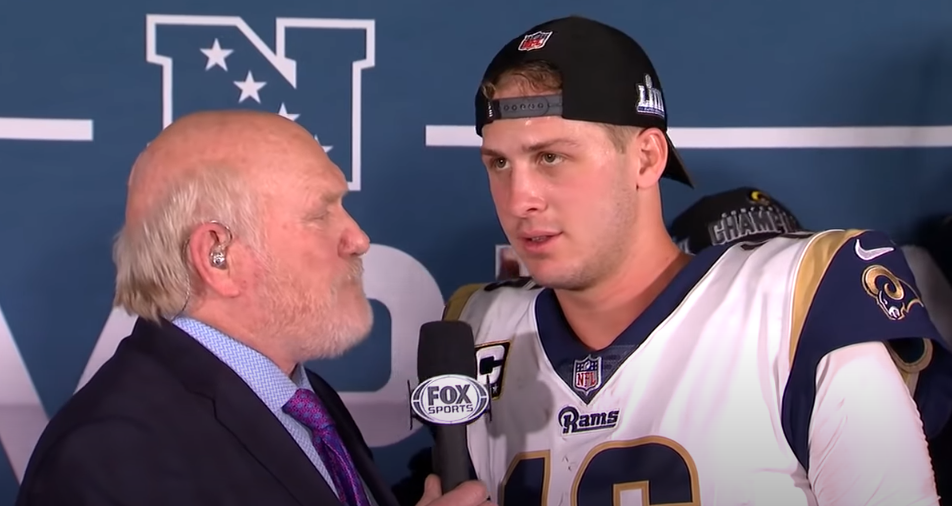
Bradshaw interviews Jared Goff after the 2018 NFC Championship Game.

Bradshaw retired from football on July 24, 1984, and quickly signed a television contract with CBS to become an NFL game analyst in 1984, where he and play-by-play announcer Verne Lundquist had the top-rated programs. Prior to his full-time work for them, he served as a guest commentator for CBS Sports' NFC postseason broadcasts from 1980–82.

Bradshaw was promoted into television studio analyst for The NFL Today in 1990 (which he hosted with Greg Gumbel through the 1993 season). In 1994, with the Fox network establishing its sports division with their purchase of NFL TV rights, Bradshaw joined Fox NFL Sunday, where he normally acts as a comic foil to his co-hosts. He was the sideline reporter for the 1996-97 Bull Riders Only World Championship event in Las Vegas on Fox. On Fox NFL Sunday, he hosts two semiregular features, Ten Yards with TB, where he fires random questions at an NFL professional, and The Terry Awards, an annual comedic award show about the NFL season. As a cross-promotional stunt, he also hosted two consecutive Digi-Bowl specials in 2001 and 2002 on Fox Kids, providing commentary from the NFL on Fox studio in-between episodes of Digimon: Digital Monsters; the 2002 special was the final one as the Fox Kids block ended the same year. He appeared on the first broadcast of NASCAR on FOX, where he took a ride with Dale Earnhardt at Daytona International Speedway the night before Earnhardt was killed in a last-lap crash in the Daytona 500. Bradshaw also waved the green flag at the start of the ill-fated race.

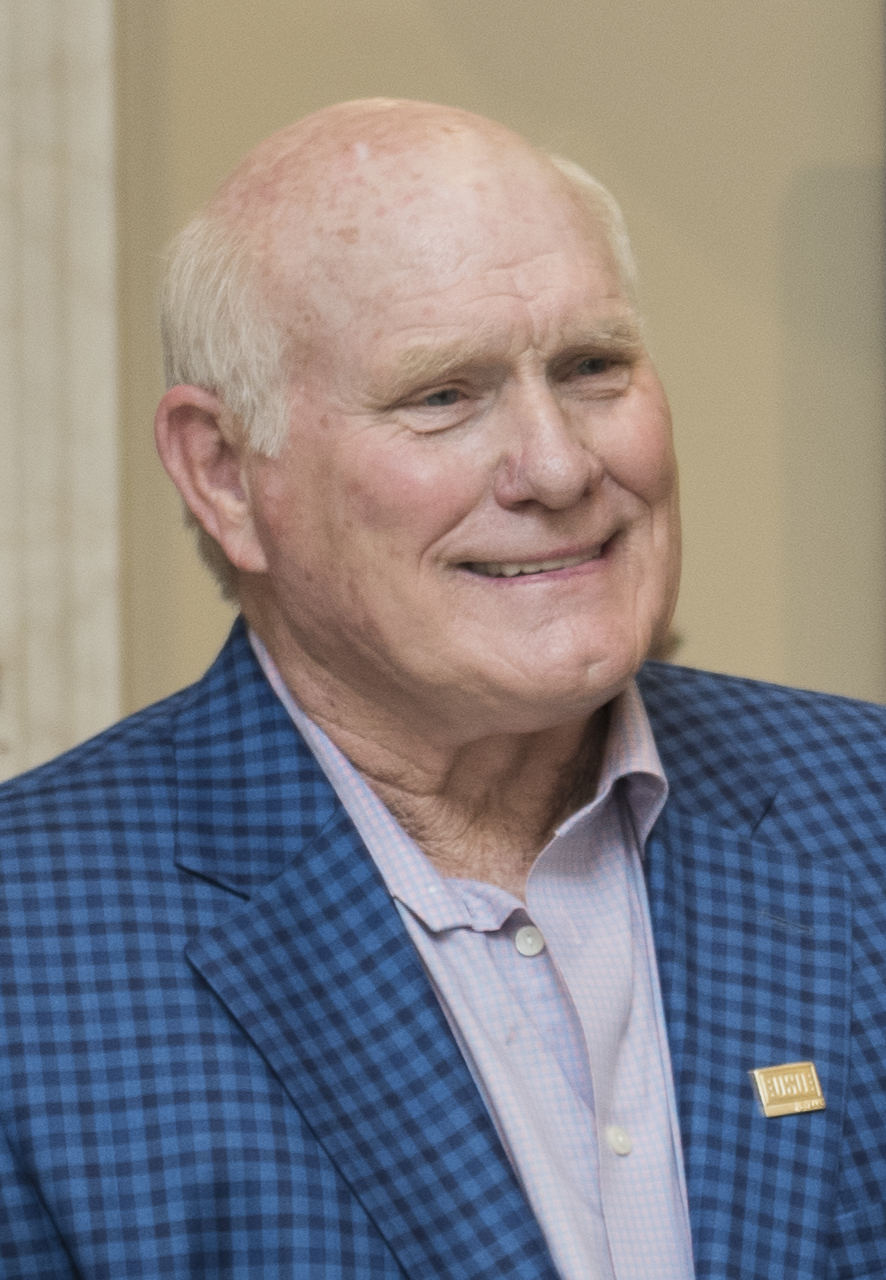
Bradshaw in 2018.

Bradshaw has the reputation of being the "ol' redneck", but in former co-host and NFL coach Jimmy Johnson's words, the act is a "schtick". According to Johnson, Bradshaw deflects such criticism by stating that "he's so dumb that he has to have somebody else fly his private plane."

Bradshaw has also garnered the reputation for criticizing players and teams. Following Super Bowl XLVI he was confronted by Ann Mara, wife of the late Wellington Mara, and "heckled" for not picking the Giants to win on Fox NFL Sunday.

For his work in broadcasting, Bradshaw has won three Sports Emmy Awards as a studio analyst.

=== Business career ===
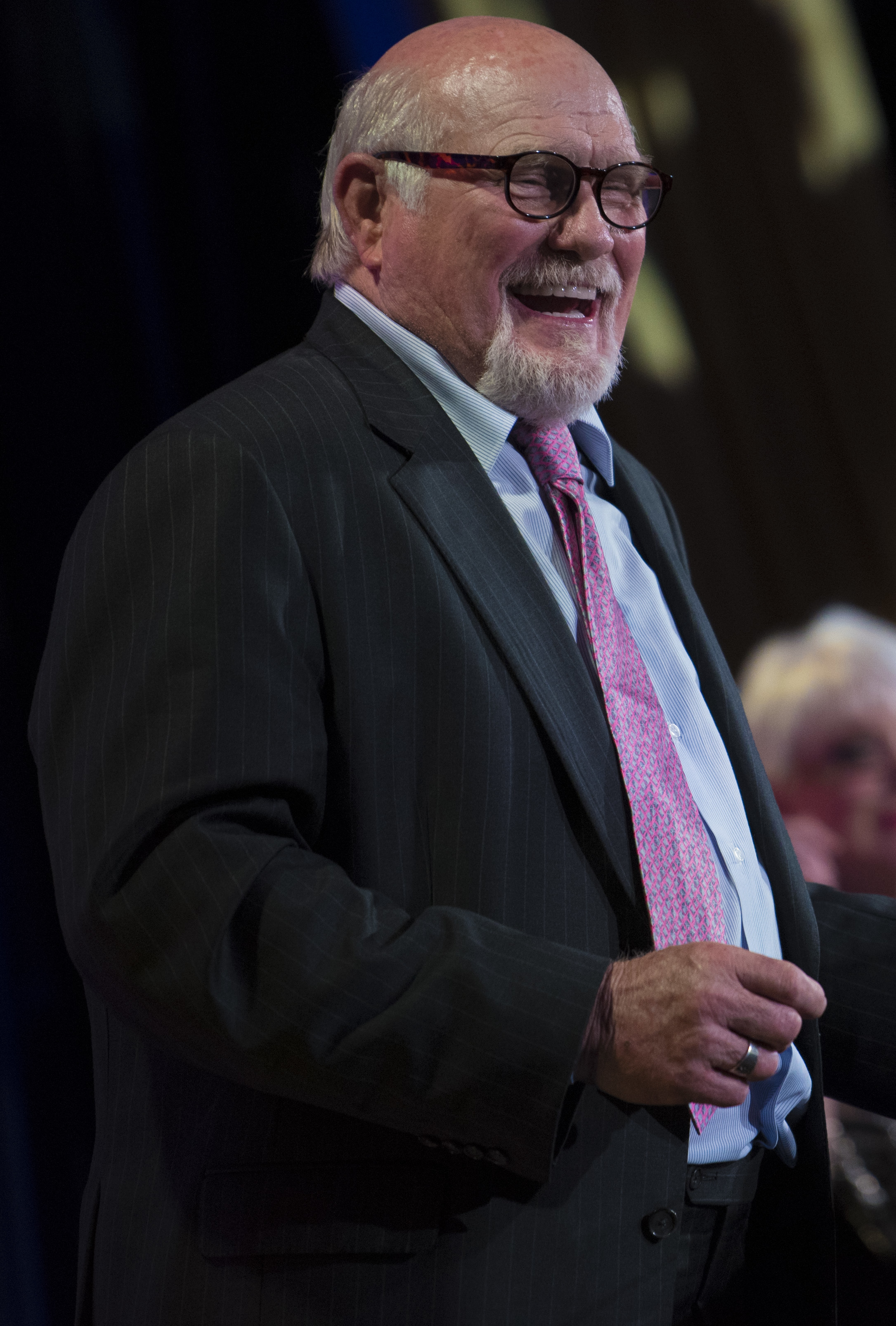
Bradshaw at a USO event in 2020.

During the early part of his career with the Steelers, Bradshaw was a used-car salesman during the off season to supplement his income, as this was still during the days when most NFL players did not make enough money to focus solely on football.

In the late 1970s and early 1980s, Bradshaw sold peanut butter with his name and image on the label. Commercials were run on television in the Shreveport market.

Bradshaw has also written or co-written five books and recorded six albums of country/western and gospel music. His cover of "I'm So Lonesome I Could Cry" hit the top 20 on Billboard's country chart (and number 91 on the Hot 100) in 1976; two other tunes ("The Last Word In Lonesome Is Me" and "Until You") also made the country charts.

In 2001, Bradshaw entered the world of NASCAR by joining with HighLine Performance Group racing team to form FitzBradshaw Racing. He also is the spokesman for Jani-King international, Inc. Bradshaw ended his ownership in 2006.

Among U.S. consumers, Bradshaw remains one of pro football's most popular retired players. As of September 2007, Bradshaw was the top-ranked former pro football player in the Davie-Brown Index, which surveys consumers to determine a celebrity's appeal and trust levels.

In early 2020, Bradshaw launched Terry Bradshaw Kentucky Straight Bourbon Whiskey, a collaboration with Silver Screen Bottling Company. The bourbon boasts 51.9 percent ABV (103.8 proof) which is Bradshaw's passing percentage. The bourbon is produced by Green River Distilling Company in Owensboro, Kentucky.

== Personal life ==
Bradshaw has been married four times. He was first married to Melissa Babish (Miss Teenage America, 1969) from 1972 to 1973; ice skater JoJo Starbuck from 1976 to 1983; and family attorney Charla Hopkins from 1983 to 1999, with whom he had two daughters, Erin and Rachel. Erin Bradshaw shows champion Paint and American Quarter Horses and is an honors graduate of the University of North Texas in Denton, Texas. Rachel Bradshaw is a graduate of Belmont University in Nashville, Tennessee, and appeared in Nashville (2007), a reality television series about young musicians trying to make it in Nashville, and is the widow of former Tennessee Titans kicker Rob Bironas. The first three of Bradshaw's marriages have all ended in divorce, a subject he jokes about frequently on his NFL pregame show. Bradshaw was married for the fourth time, on July 8, 2014, to Tammy, his girlfriend of 15 years.

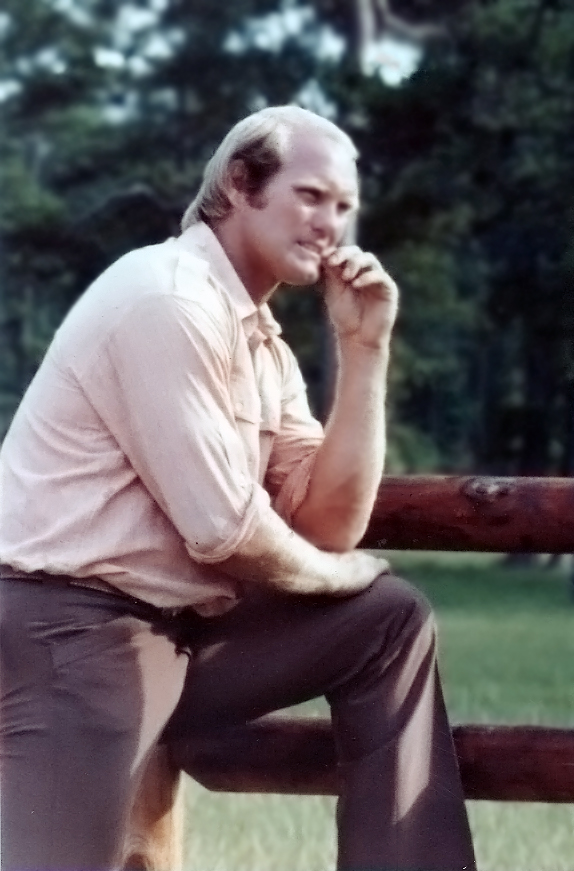
Bradshaw (age 30) at his Quarter Horse ranch in Louisiana (1979).

After his NFL career ended, Bradshaw disclosed that he had frequently experienced anxiety attacks after games. The problem worsened in the late 1990s after his third divorce, when he said he "could not bounce back" as he had after the previous divorces or after a bad game. In addition to anxiety attacks, his symptoms included weight loss, frequent crying, and sleeplessness. He was diagnosed with clinical depression. Since then, he has taken Paxil regularly. He chose to speak out about his depression to overcome the stigma associated with it and to urge others to seek help.

Bradshaw's anxieties about appearing in public, away from the controlled environment of a television studio, led to an unintentional estrangement from the Steelers. When team founder and owner Art Rooney died in 1988, Bradshaw did not attend his funeral. A year later, during his Hall of Fame induction speech, Bradshaw made a point of saluting his late boss and friend, pointing to the sky and saying, "Art Rooney ... boy, I tell you, I loved that man."

Still, Bradshaw never returned to Three Rivers Stadium for a Steelers game. When the last regular-season game was played there on December 16, 2000, against the Washington Redskins, Bradshaw was with the Fox NFL Sunday crew, doing their pregame show aboard the aircraft carrier USS Harry S. Truman, while Fox covered the game live. Bradshaw expressed regret that he could not be there, but later said privately that he did not feel he could face the crowds. Not until September 2002, when fellow Hall of Fame teammate and longtime friend Mike Webster died, did Bradshaw finally return to Pittsburgh to attend his friend's funeral.

In October 2002, Bradshaw returned to the Steelers sideline for the first time in 20 years for a Monday night game between the Steelers and the Indianapolis Colts. In 2003, when the Steelers played the 1,000th game in franchise history, Fox covered the game at Heinz Field, and Bradshaw returned to cover the game. In addition to appearing to take his position on the Steelers All-Time Team in 2007 as part of the team's 75th-anniversary festivities, he also was on the sideline alongside a number of his teammates such as Mean Joe Greene and Franco Harris for the game against the Baltimore Ravens on November 5. Despite those appearances, Bradshaw's appearances at Steelers functions have remained relatively rare compared to his Hall of Fame teammates from his playing days.

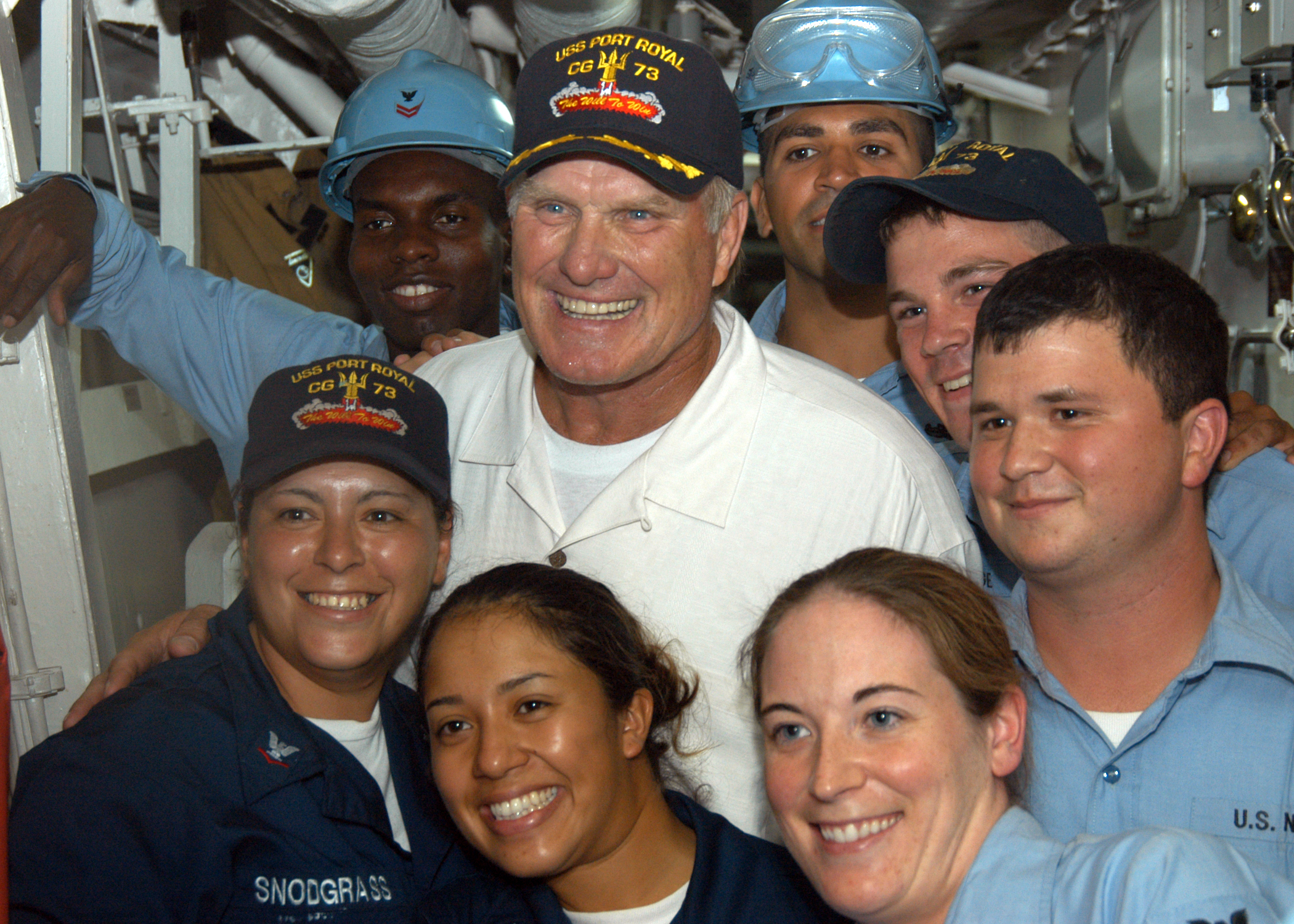
Bradshaw poses with Sailors during a visit aboard the guided missile cruiser USS Port Royal.

Politically, Bradshaw is a long-time supporter of the Republican Party. In 2012, he went on record on Fox News as supporting the candidacy of Newt Gingrich for the Republican presidential nomination. In the same interview, he also labeled linebacker Terrell Suggs "an idiot" for making comments critical of Denver Broncos quarterback Tim Tebow's public remarks about his Christian faith, saying Suggs "better be careful; if I were him I'd be on my hands and knees tonight asking for forgiveness because that's totally unacceptable."

Bradshaw has made statements critical of President of the United States Donald Trump. During a 2017 episode of FOX NFL Sunday, Bradshaw, while not condoning NFL players kneeling during the national anthem, stated, "if our country stands for anything, folks, it's freedom. People died for that freedom. I'm not sure if our President understands those rights. That every American has the right to speak out also to protest. Believe me, these athletes do love our [this] great country of ours. Personally, I think our President should concentrate on North Korea and healthcare rather than ripping into athletes and the NFL." After the Super Bowl LII Champion Philadelphia Eagles White House visit was cancelled due to Trump's anti-anthem protest sentiment, Bradshaw voiced his support for the Philadelphia Eagles, stating that "Trump just needs to go somewhere and enjoy the money he's got." In 2019, Bradshaw appeared on Fox & Friends and commented on Donald Trump's planned attendance of a regular-season game between the University of Alabama and Louisiana State University, stating that he respects Donald Trump "having the guts to go in there."

=== Health ===
In September 2022, after viewers expressed concern during his appearance on Fox NFL Sunday, Bradshaw revealed he had been treated for bladder cancer and neck cancer between 2021 and 2022.

=== Relationship with Chuck Noll ===
While Bradshaw never had any problems with the Rooney family, he had a complicated relationship with Steelers head coach Chuck Noll. Noll and Bradshaw had an uneasy relationship during his playing days, with Bradshaw stating that he felt that Noll was too hard on him and never liked him, though the two made peace (at least publicly) before Noll's death in 2014.

In an interview with NFL Films in 2016 for an episode of A Football Life about Noll, Bradshaw felt that they had too much of a culture clash with their personalities. Bradshaw also stated that Noll belittled him constantly and that Bradshaw wanted positive reinforcement instead of "being grabbed at". In the same episode, however, former Steelers public relations director Joe Gordon characterized the animosity as "a one-way street," with former teammate Jack Ham adding that Noll "insulated" Bradshaw from certain issues while taking a "rest of us be damned" approach with the other players.

In an archival interview, Noll described his relationship with Bradshaw as "professional" and "business-like" and that his personality needed to conform with the team, adding, "it worked, even if Bradshaw didn't like it." Nonetheless, Bradshaw chose not to attend Noll's funeral despite being in Pittsburgh at the time.

== Television and film career ==
Bradshaw has appeared in numerous television commercials. The most recent was the series of live ads for Tide detergent along with his Fox Sports co-host Curt Menefee, where Bradshaw shows up with a shirt stain on what appeared to be live TV from the Fox broadcast booth at Super Bowl LI and then washes it with Tide at the house of Jeffrey Tambor. The teasers leading up to the Super Bowl showed Tambor initially taking his shirts to Rob Gronkowski's dry cleaners, only to see the sleeves get ripped out. Near the end of the Super Bowl, Menefee spills coffee on his shirt, but Tambor, who is watching on TV, refuses to help out.

Bradshaw has had cameo appearances in many shows as himself, including Brotherly Love, Everybody Loves Raymond, Married... with Children, Modern Family, The Larry Sanders Show, and The League. He also appeared on Malcolm in the Middle with Howie Long as the trashy coach of a women's ice hockey team. He hosted a short-lived television series in 1997 called Home Team with Terry Bradshaw.

In addition to his television work, Bradshaw has appeared in several movies, including a part in the 1978 film Hooper, which starred Burt Reynolds, Jan-Michael Vincent, and Sally Field, and made an appearance in the 1981 film The Cannonball Run. In 1980, he had a cameo in Smokey and the Bandit II, which starred Burt Reynolds, Jerry Reed, and Sally Field. He made a guest appearance in The Adventures of Brisco County, Jr. in 1994, playing Colonel Forrest March, a rogue U.S. Army officer who gave orders to his squad (played by NFL players Ken Norton Jr., Carl Banks, and Jim Harbaugh) in a huddle using football diagrams.

Bradshaw appeared on Jeff Foxworthy's short-lived sitcom The Jeff Foxworthy Show as a motivational speaker for people needing to change their lives. Bill Engvall's character is affected by Bradshaw's rantings about witchcraft and voodoo in his pregame warm-ups.

On October 11, 2001, Bradshaw received a star on the Hollywood Walk of Fame, the first NFL player to do so.

In 2006, Bradshaw returned to the silver screen in the motion picture Failure to Launch. He and Kathy Bates played the parents of Matthew McConaughey's character. In one notable scene, he appeared nude, which his own daughters (who were teenagers at the time) did not even know about until they saw the movie's premiere with their grandmother and were half-heartedly warned by Bradshaw just moments before the scene.

He is also a devout Christian and wrote the book Terry Bradshaw: Man of Steel with broadcaster Dave Diles. Since 2010, Bradshaw has been hosting television shows produced by United States Media Television.

In 2017, Bradshaw appeared as himself in the comedy film Father Figures.

In 2016 and 2018, Bradshaw had a leading role in the NBC reality-travel series Better Late Than Never, where he travels around the world with William Shatner, Henry Winkler, George Foreman, and Jeff Dye. In 2017, he had a supporting role as a fictionalized version of himself in the comedy film Father Figures.

On January 16, 2019, Bradshaw competed in season one of The Masked Singer as "Deer".

On October 12, 2019, Bradshaw and his family competed in Celebrity Family Feud against Adam Rippon's team. They went on to go to the final round but failed to get to 200 points.

On January 2, 2020, he was on the season-eight premiere of Last Man Standing.

On September 17, 2020, Bradshaw and his family premiered their new E! reality show The Bradshaw Bunch.

== Discography ==
=== Albums ===
Year	Album	Label
1976	I'm So Lonesome I Could Cry	Mercury
1981	Until You	Benson
1981	Here in My Heart	Heart
1996	Sings Christmas Songs for the Whole World	Dove
1996	Terry & Jake (with Jake Hess)	Chordant

=== Singles ===
Year	Single	Chart positions			Album
Year	Single	US Country	US	CAN Country	Album
1976	"I'm So Lonesome I Could Cry"	17	91	17	I'm So Lonesome I Could Cry
1976	"The Last Word in Lonesome Is Me"	90	—	—	I'm So Lonesome I Could Cry
1976	"Here Comes My Baby Back Again"	—	—	—	I'm So Lonesome I Could Cry
1980	"Until You"	73	—	—	Until You
2012	"Lights of Louisiana"	—	—	—	
2020	"Quarantine Crazy"	—	—	—	

=== Guest appearances ===
- Married... with Children ("Dud Bowl II", 1995)
- NFL Country (with Glen Campbell on "You Never Know Just How Good You've Got It", 1996)
- Everybody Loves Raymond ("Debra's Sick", 1997)
- The Larry Sanders Show ("Just the Perfect Blendship", 1998)
- King of the Hill ("Peggy Makes the Big Leagues", 2000)
- The League (Sunday at Ruxin's, 2009)
- Modern Family ("Brushes With Celebrity", 2017)
- The Masked Singer - (The Deer, 2019)
- Celebrity Ghost Stories - (Terry Bradshaw, 2020)

== See also ==
- Most consecutive playoff games with at least two touchdown passes (NFL)
- List of National Football League career quarterback wins leaders
