= Marilu Henner =

American actress and singer (born 1952)

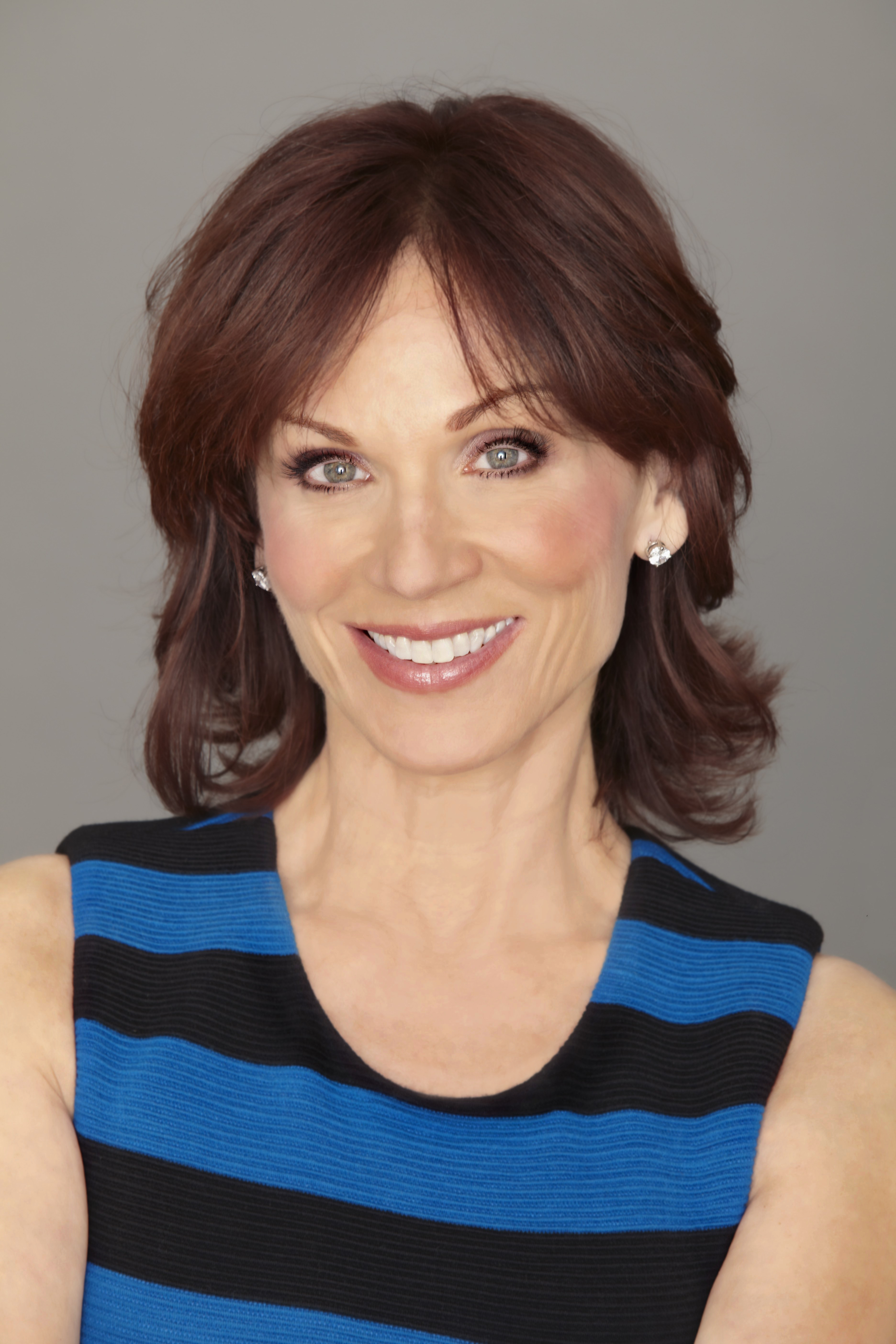
- Henner in 2011
- Born: Mary Lucy Denise Pudlowski; April 6, 1952 (age 74); Chicago, Illinois, U.S.
- Occupations: Actress; singer; dancer; author; producer; host
- Years active: 1971–present
- Spouses: Frederic Forrest (m. 1980; div. 1982) Robert Lieberman (m. 1990; div. 2001) Michael Brown (m. 2006)
- Children: 2, including Nick Lieberman
- Website: instagram.com/TheRealMarilu

Marilu Henner (born April 6, 1952) is an American actress, singer, dancer, television host, and author. She began her career appearing in the original Chicago production of the musical Grease in 1971 and its Broadway production in 1972, before making her screen debut in the 1977 comedy-drama film Between the Lines. In 1978, Henner was cast in her breakthrough role as Elaine O'Connor Nardo in the ABC/NBC sitcom Taxi, a role she played until 1983 and for which she received five Golden Globe Award nominations.

Henner later had co-starring roles in films such as Hammett (1982), The Man Who Loved Women (1983), Cannonball Run II (1984), Johnny Dangerously (1984), Rustlers' Rhapsody (1985), Ladykillers (1988), L.A. Story (1991), and Noises Off (1992). She returned to television with a starring role in the CBS sitcom Evening Shade (1990–1994), and had leading roles in many television films.

Henner is the author of a number of best-selling self-help books, including Total Health Makeover (2000) and Total Memory Makeover (2012).

Henner's memory is one of fewer than 100 known cases of Highly Superior Autobiographical Memory. Henner has the ability to remember the details of every day of her life.

== Early life ==
Marilu Henner was born on April 6, 1952, in Chicago, Illinois, the daughter of Loretta Callis and Joseph Henner. Henner's birth name is Mary Lucy Denise Pudlowski. She was the middle child of six siblings, including JoAnn, Melody, Marilu, Tommy, Christal, and Lorin Henner. She is of Greek and Polish descent. Her father, born Joseph Pudlowski, died of a heart attack at age 52, when Henner was 17, and her mother, born Nikoleta Kalogeropoulos, died of complications from arthritis at age 58, when Henner was 26.

Henner attended Madonna High School in Chicago, an all-girls, Catholic school. She had a great interest in the theatre. Henner had good grades, and she was named Outstanding Teenager of Illinois in 1970. She received four scholarships for college.

In 1970, Henner began attending the University of Chicago in Hyde Park, in the class of 1974. In 1971, Henner was in the original Chicago production of Grease at the Kingston Mines Theatre Company in the role of Marty. She left the University in 1972.

== Acting career ==
=== Stage ===
When Grease in Chicago was discovered and a new production of it began on Broadway in New York in 1972, Henner was asked to reprise the role of Marty for the national tour of the production. She toured alongside John Travolta, who played Doody, and Jeff Conaway, who played Danny Zuko. The role ended her college career and began her acting career.

Additional Broadway credits for Henner include Over Here! (1974) with Travolta, revivals of Pal Joey (1976), Chicago (1996), Social Security (1986), and The Tale of the Allergist's Wife (2000).

In 2026, Henner appeared in The Ask, a two-person off-Broadway play co-starring Shannon Purser. The Ask officially opened October 15, and runs through November 22.

=== Film ===
Her first film appearance was in the 1977 sleeper-hit Between the Lines, co-starring then-unknowns Jeff Goldblum, Lindsay Crouse, John Heard, and Jill Eikenberry. Her second role was opposite Richard Gere in the 1978 film Bloodbrothers.

She was the leading lady in the 1982 film Hammett directed by Wim Wenders, produced by Francis Ford Coppola and starring her first husband Frederic Forrest. In 1983, Henner starred opposite Burt Reynolds in The Man Who Loved Women, directed by Blake Edwards. Reynolds then asked Henner to join the cast of Cannonball Run II later that year along with Shirley MacLaine and Dom DeLuise. She was the leading lady in the 1984 film Johnny Dangerously, playing the love interest to Michael Keaton. In 1985, she once again appeared alongside John Travolta in Perfect. In 1991, she appeared opposite Steve Martin in L.A. Story as Trudi, a role for which she received a nomination for an American Comedy Award as the Funniest Supporting Female in a Motion Picture. She also appeared in Noises Off (1992) and in Man on the Moon (1999), a film about her Taxi co-star Andy Kaufman. Henner played herself (as well as herself playing her Taxi character).

=== Television ===
In 1978 Henner came to prominence with the role of Elaine Nardo in the situation comedy Taxi. She portrayed a single mother working as a cabbie who aspired to work at an art gallery. A breakthrough role for Henner, she played Nardo until 1983, receiving five Golden Globe Award nominations. The show was a critical and commercial success and is widely regarded as one of the greatest television shows of all time.

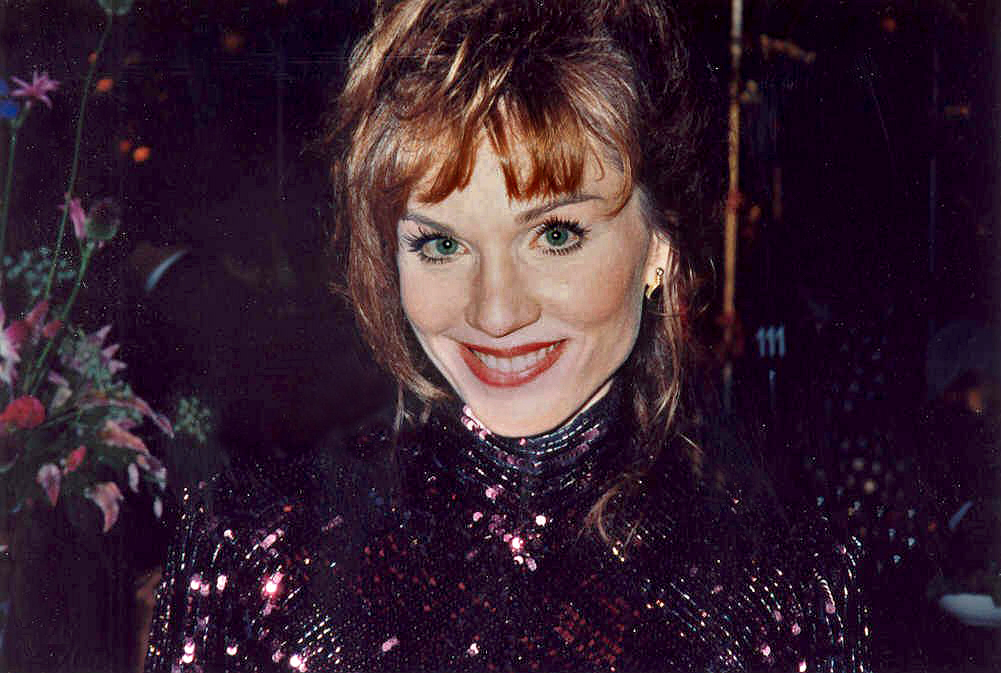
Henner at the 1991 Emmy Awards

Henner guested on Match Game and Hollywood Squares.

From 1990 through 1994, she appeared opposite Burt Reynolds in the situation comedy Evening Shade, which also starred Ossie Davis and Hal Holbrook.

In 1994, she hosted her own daytime talk show, Marilu, for 165 episodes.

In 2006 and 2007, she was the host of the television series America's Ballroom Challenge. Henner said on an episode of The Ellen DeGeneres Show, in early 2008, that she had never actually danced ballroom and would like to go on a season of Dancing with the Stars. This would later come true in 2016 for season 23 of that show. She later hosted FitTV and The Discovery Channel's Shape Up Your Life, which is based on her books.

Henner was a contestant on NBC's first The Celebrity Apprentice, in 2008. She was fired by Donald Trump in the eighth episode but was brought back to help fellow contestant Trace Adkins in the final task of the show.

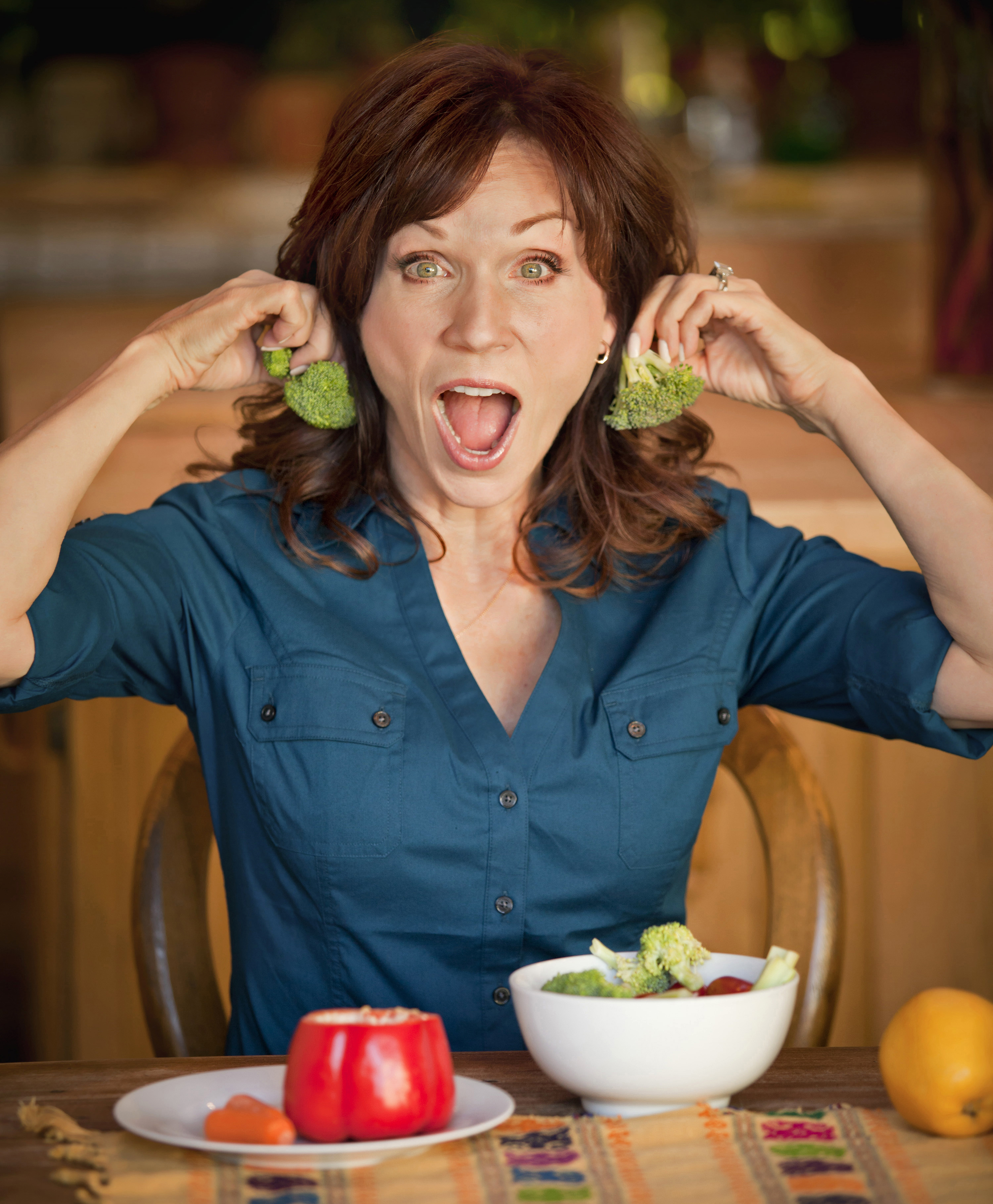
Henner in July 2010

In August 2012, Henner won $25,000 for the charity Physicians Committee for Responsible Medicine (PCRM) as a celebrity contestant on Live! with Kelly "Grilling with the Stars" contest for her Healthy/Easy Grilled Mushroom and Heirloom Tomato dish.

Henner rejoined The Apprentice for its 13th season on The All-Star Celebrity Apprentice where she was joined by fellow Apprentice alumni. She played for her charity The Alzheimer's Association and won over $50,000 for the cause. She returned, after being eliminated, for the final task to assist Trace Adkins. In 2013, Henner made a guest appearance on Brooklyn Nine-Nine for 5 episodes.

On August 30, 2016, she was revealed as one of the celebrities who would compete on season 23 of Dancing with the Stars. She was partnered with professional dancer Derek Hough. Henner and Hough were eliminated on the ninth week of competition and finished in sixth place. On July 10, 2018, she appeared as a "guestpert" on the podcast My Brother, My Brother and Me. In 2018, Henner appeared on the first season of The Neighborhood, a CBS series starring Cedric the Entertainer, Tichina Arnold and Beth Behrs. Henner appeared in episode 8 of the first season titled, “Welcome to Thanksgiving”.

In September 2026, it was announced that Henner would join the long-running Hallmark Channel series When Calls the Heart in a recurring guest role.

=== Voice work ===
She provided the voice for Gotham City socialite Veronica Vreeland in Batman: The Animated Series (1992–1999), reprising the role in the animated films Batman: Mask of the Phantasm (1993) and Batman & Mr. Freeze: SubZero (1998).

=== Music videos ===
The music video for "Weird Al" Yankovic's theme song, "This Is the Life", written for the movie Johnny Dangerously includes scenes from the movie with Henner.

Henner starred as the domineering mother of the bride in the Brooks & Dunn video "You Can't Take the Honky Tonk Out of the Girl" in 2003.

== Author ==
Henner has written nine self-help books on memory, diet, and health, including New York Times Bestsellers Total Health Makeover (2000) and Healthy Life Kitchen (2000). Both of her parents died in their 50s, which prompted her to lead a healthier lifestyle. She advocates the virtues of a non-dairy diet in conjunction with food combining and exercise. She led monthly classes on her website, now defunct, designed to help people integrate these steps into a healthier, more active lifestyle. She hosted The Art of Living, produced by United States Media Television.

Henner's book Total Memory Makeover: Uncover Your Past, Take Charge of Your Future (2012) was published after the American television program 60 Minutes explored the rare memory abilities of people like her who can remember details of every day of their lives. One goal of the book was to help readers develop their own autobiographical memory.

== Rare memory ability ==
On December 19, 2010, the television program 60 Minutes broadcast a story on Highly Superior Autobiographical Memory (HSAM), or hyperthymesia, the ability of some people to remember details of every day of their lives. Henner was featured as part of the story for that ability. Her remarkable memory had been recognized since before 1989, when she was interviewed about it on the talk show Later by Bob Costas. Lesley Stahl, the host of the 60 Minutes piece and a friend of Henner's, arranged for Henner's memory to be tested by memory expert James McGaugh at the University of California, Irvine for 60 Minutes, confirming that she had HSAM. Henner's memory is one of fewer than 100 known cases of HSAM.

With her memory, Henner was a consultant for the CBS crime drama Unforgettable (2011-2016), which starred Poppy Montgomery as Carrie Wells. The character Wells is a woman with a similar memory ability that she uses as a police detective. Henner guest-starred as Carrie's aunt Evie.

== Personal life ==
Henner has two sons, Nicholas Lieberman and Joseph Lieberman, from her second marriage to Robert Lieberman.

The jazz track "The Marilu" by pianist Bob James, who composed the music for Taxi, is a tribute to Henner.

== Filmography ==
=== Film ===
Year	Title	Role	Notes
1977	Between the Lines	Danielle	
1978	Bloodbrothers	Annette Palladino	
1982	Hammett	Kit Conger / Sue Alabama	
1983	The Man Who Loved Women	Agnes Chapman	
1984	Cannonball Run II	Betty	
1984	Johnny Dangerously	Lil Sheridan	
1985	Rustlers' Rhapsody	Miss Tracy	
1985	Perfect	Sally Marcus	
1987	Grand Larceny	Freddy Grand	
1991	L.A. Story	Trudi	
1991	Chains of Gold	Jackie	
1992	Noises Off	Belinda Blair / Flavia Brent	
1993	Batman: Mask of the Phantasm	Socialite	Voice
1994	Chasers	Katie	
1998	Batman & Mr. Freeze: SubZero	Veronica Vreeland	Voice
1999	Man on the Moon	Herself	Uncredited
1999	The Titanic Chronicles	Mrs. Stuart While	Voice
2000	Enemies of Laughter	Dani	
2012	Vamps	Angela Horowitz	
2016	Imperfections	Val	
2018	Life with Dog	Alice	
2020	The Mimic	The Assistant Editor	
2023	Haunted Mansion	Carol	
2024	Rock and Doris (Try to) Write a Movie	Doris Adams	

=== Television ===
Year	Title	Role	Notes
1977	Off Campus	Janet	Television film
1978	The Paper Chase	Susu	Episode: "The Paper Chase"
1978–1983	Taxi	Elaine O'Connor Nardo	Main role (114 episodes)
1981	Dream House	Laura Griffith	Television film
1982	Fridays	Herself	2 episodes
1982	Saturday Night Live	Herself	Episode: "Danny DeVito/Sparks"
1983	Super Bowl XVII Pre-Game Show	Elaine Nardo	Television film
1985	Stark	Ashley Walters	Television film
1985	Alfred Hitchcock Presents	Claire	Episode: "Method Actor"
1985	Great Performances	Louise	Episode: "Grown-Ups"
1986	Who's the Boss?	Diane Wilmington	Episode: "Angela's New Best Friend"
1986	Love with a Perfect Stranger	Victoria Ducane	Television film
1988	Channel 99	Susan McDowell	Television film
1988	Ladykillers	Samantha Flannery	Television film
1989	The Tracey Ullman Show	Pregnant Woman	Episode: "My Baby"
1990–1994	Evening Shade	Ava Evans Newton	Main role (98 episodes)
1992	The Legend of Prince Valiant	Lady Catherine	Episode: "The Trap"
1993–1995	Batman: The Animated Series	Veronica Vreeland	Voice, 4 episodes
1995	Cybill	Terry Belmont	Episode: "Since I Lost My Baby"
1995	Fight for Justice: The Nancy Conn Story	Nancy Conn	Television film
1995	Comic Relief VII	Herself	Television special
1996	My Son Is Innocent	Margaret Sutter	Television film
1996	For the Future: The Irvine Fertility Scandal	Debbie Challender	Television film
1996	Titanic	Molly Brown	Miniseries
1997	George and Leo	Van Passenger	Episode: "The Cameo Episode"
1997–1998	The New Batman Adventures	Veronica Vreeland	Voice, 2 episodes
2000	A Tale of Two Bunnies	Miranda	Television film
2000	Rocket's Red Glare	Meg Baker	Television film
2002	Providence	Georgia	2 episodes
2002	Greg the Bunny	Maggie DeMontague	Episode: "Blah Bawls"
2003	Andy Richter Controls the Universe	Herself	Voice, episode: "Bully the Kid"
2003	Love Rules!	Carol	Television film
2004	Center of the Universe	Sharon Singleton	Episode: "Alarmed and Dangerous"
2005	Living With Fran	Donna Martin	Episode: "Riley's Parents"
2005	Gone But Not Forgotten	Nancy Gordon	Television film
2005	The Comeback	Herself	Episode: "Pilot"
2006–2007	America's Ballroom Challenge	Host	Reality-competition series
2008	Good Behavior	Sydney Lake	Unsold television pilot
2008	The Governor's Wife	Ann Danville	Television film
2008	My Boys	Pamela Newman	Episode: "John, Cougar, Newman Camp"
2009	ER	Linda	Episode: "And in the End..."
2009	Party Down	Pepper McMasters	Episode: "Pepper McMasters Singles Seminar"
2010	Numb3rs	Regina Landers	Episode: "And the Winner Is..."
2011	Accidentally in Love	Carol	Television film
2011	Grey's Anatomy	Mrs. Moser	Episode: "Poker Face"
2011	Unforgettable	Aunt Evie	Episode: "Golden Bird"
2012	Holiday High School Reunion	Beverly Hunt	Television film
2012	Hitched for the Holidays	Maxine Greene	Television film
2013	Two and a Half Men	Linda	Episode: "Cows, Prepare to Be Tipped"
2013	The Glades	Joan Longworth	2 episodes
2014	June in January	Diana Blackwell	Television film
2014	Brooklyn Nine-Nine	Vivian Ludley	5 episodes
2014	Phineas and Ferb	Nana's Friend	Voice, episode: "Operation Crumb Cake"
2014	Signed, Sealed, Delivered	Glynis Rucker	Guest star; 2 episodes
2014	The Crazy Ones	Paige Roberts	Episode: "The Lighthouse"
2015	A Bone To Pick: An Aurora Teagarden Mystery	Aida Teagarden	Television film
2015	Real Murders: An Aurora Teagarden Mystery	Aida Teagarden	Television film
2016	In-Lawfully Yours	Naomi	Television film
2016	Three Bedrooms, One Corpse: An Aurora Teagarden Mystery	Aida Teagarden	Television film
2016	Love on a Limb	Zee Roarke	Television film
2016	Dancing with the Stars	Herself	Contestant on season 23
2016	The Julius House: An Aurora Teagarden Mystery	Aida Teagarden	Television film
2017	Dead Over Heels: An Aurora Teagarden Mystery	Aida Teagarden	Television film
2017	A Bundle of Trouble: An Aurora Teagarden Mystery	Aida Teagarden	Television film
2018	Last Scene Alive: An Aurora Teagarden Mystery	Aida Teagarden	Television film
2018	Reap What You Sew: An Aurora Teagarden Mystery	Aida Teagarden	Television film
2018	The Disappearing Game: An Aurora Teagarden Mystery	Aida Teagarden	Television film
2018	The Neighborhood	Paula	Episode: "Welcome to Thanksgiving"
2019	A Game of Cat and Mouse: An Aurora Teagarden Mystery	Aida Teagarden	Television film
2019	An Inheritance to Die For: An Aurora Teagarden Mystery	Aida Teagarden	Television film
2019	A Very Foul Play: An Aurora Teagarden Mystery	Aida Teagarden	Television film
2020	Heist and Seek: An Aurora Teagarden Mystery	Aida Teagarden	Television film
2020	Reunited and it Feels So Deadly: An Aurora Teagarden Mystery	Aida Teagarden	Television film
2020	Love, Lights, Hanukkah!	Ruth	Television film
2020	Bob Hearts Abishola	Trish Dolan	Episode: "There's My Nigerians"
2021	How to Con a Con: An Aurora Teagarden Mystery	Aida Teagarden	Television film
2021	Pearl in the Mist	Miss Ironwood	Television film
2021	Til Death Do Us Part: An Aurora Teagarden Mystery	Aida Teagarden	Television film
2021	Honeymoon, Honeymurder: An Aurora Teagarden Mystery	Aida Teagarden	Television film
2021	A Kiss Before Christmas	Rona Bellingham	Television film
2022	Haunted By Murder: An Aurora Teagarden Mystery	Aida Teagarden	Television film
2022	A Kismet Christmas	Grandma Mia	Television film
2023	NCIS: Los Angeles	Elizabeth Killbride	Episode: "A Farewell to Arms"
2023	Aurora Teagarden Mysteries: Something New	Aida Teagarden	Television film
2024	Aurora Teagarden Mysteries: A Lesson in Murder	Aida Teagarden	Television film
2024	Aurora Teagarden Mysteries: Death at the Diner	Aida Teagarden	Television film

=== Stage ===
Year	Title	Role	Notes
1972	Grease	Marty (Replacement)	Eden Theatre, Broadway
1974	Over Here!	Donna	Sam S. Shubert Theatre, Broadway
1976	Pal Joey	Ensemble	Circle in the Square Theatre, Broadway
1986	Social Security	Barbara Kahn (Replacement)	Ethel Barrymore Theatre, Broadway
1988	Super Sunday	Christy	Williamstown Theatre Festival
1996	Chicago	Roxie Hart (Replacement)	Ambassador Theatre, Broadway
2000	Annie Get Your Gun	Annie Oakley	National Tour
2000	The Tale of the Allergist's Wife	Lee (Replacement)	Ethel Barrymore Theatre, Broadway
2014	Vanya and Sonia and Masha and Spike	Masha	Bucks County Playhouse
2018	Gettin' the Band Back Together	Sharon Papadopolous	Belasco Theatre, Broadway
2023	Madwomen of the West	Zoey	Actors Temple Theatre, Off-Broadway
2024	Noises Off	Belinda Blair	Bucks County Playhouse
2024	Last of the Red Hot Mamas	Belinda	Bucks County Playhouse
2024	The Journals of Adam and Eve	Eve	Loreto Theater, Off-Broadway
2026	Pen Pals	Mags	Daryl Roth Theatre, Off-Broadway
2026	The Ask	Greta	Theater 555, Off-Broadway

== Published books ==
- By All Means Keep On Moving (September 5, 1994)
- Marilu Henner's Total Health Makeover (May 6, 1998)
- The 30-Day Total Health Makeover (March 3, 1999)
- I Refuse to Raise a Brat (October 12, 1999)
- Healthy Life Kitchen (July 10, 2000)
- Healthy Kids: Help Them Eat Smart and Stay Active—for Life! (August 7, 2001)
- Healthy Holidays (October 1, 2002)
- Wear Your Life Well: Use What You Have to Get What You Want (April 8, 2008)
- Total Memory Makeover: Uncover Your Past, Take Charge of Your Future (April 24, 2012)
