= It's Getting Better All the Time =

Single by Brooks & Dunn

from the album The Greatest Hits Collection II
- Released: November 22, 2004
- Recorded: 2004
- Genre: Country
- Length: 4:14 (album version); 3:56 (radio edit)
- Label: Arista Nashville
- Songwriters: Ronnie Bowman; Don Cook
- Producers: Mark Wright, Brooks & Dunn

Brooks & Dunn singles chronology
"That's What It's All About" (2004)	"It's Getting Better All the Time" (2004)	"Play Something Country" (2005)

"It's Getting Better All the Time" is a song written by Ronnie Bowman and Don Cook, and recorded by American country music duo Brooks & Dunn that reached the top of the Billboard Hot Country Songs chart. It was released in November 2004 as the second single from their compilation album The Greatest Hits Collection II.

== Cover versions ==
In April 2010, Rascal Flatts performed a cover of the song during CBS' Brooks & Dunn: The Last Rodeo special.

== Chart positions ==
"It's Getting Better All the Time" debuted at number 52 on the U.S. Billboard Hot Country Singles & Tracks chart for the week of December 4, 2004.

Chart (2004–2005)	Peak position
Canada Country (Radio & Records)	3
US Hot Country Songs (Billboard)	1
US Billboard Hot 100	56

=== Year-end charts ===
Chart (2005)	Position
US Country Songs (Billboard)	12
