= The Long Goodbye (song) =

2000 single by Paul Brady

Single by Paul Brady

from the album Oh What a World
- Released: 24 April 2000
- Genre: Rock, folk
- Length: 4:22 (album version); 3:57 (single version)
- Label: Rykodisc
- Songwriters: Paul Brady, Ronan Keating
- Producers: Alastair McMillan, Paul Brady

"The Long Goodbye" is a song written by Irish singer-songwriters Paul Brady and Ronan Keating for Brady's 2000 album Oh What a World. In October 2001, it was released by American country music duo Brooks & Dunn as the third single from their album Steers & Stripes. Ronan Keating released his version in April 2003 as the last single from his album Destination (2002).

== Track listing ==
- Promotional CD single
1. "The Long Goodbye" – 3:57

== Brooks & Dunn version ==
"The Long Goodbye"

Single by Brooks & Dunn

from the album Steers & Stripes
- B-side: "Only in America"
- Released: 22 October 2001
- Genre: Country
- Length: 3:15 (single edit); 3:51 (album version); 4:25 (The Greatest Hits Collection II version)
- Label: Arista Nashville 69101
- Songwriters: Paul Brady, Ronan Keating
- Producers: Kix Brooks, Ronnie Dunn, Mark Wright

Brooks & Dunn singles chronology
"Only in America" (2001)	"The Long Goodbye" (2001)	"My Heart Is Lost to You" (2002)

"The Long Goodbye" was recorded by country music duo Brooks & Dunn for their album Steers & Stripes (2001). The single was Number One hit on the Billboard Hot Country Singles & Tracks (now Hot Country Songs) charts, and a No. 39 hit on the Billboard Hot 100.

=== Background ===
Ronnie Dunn, one-half of the duo, was initially challenged by this song. "For me, I didn't know if I could sing some of these songs, if I could get inside them. So I'd take the tracks home...Paul Brady's demo of 'The Long Good-bye was intimidating...How do you do that? I'd work in my barn, explore the songs, try things, really learn where the song wanted to go, where I wanted to go."

=== Critical reception ===
Chuck Taylor, of Billboard magazine reviewed the song favorably saying that the song has more of a pop flavor than most of their other music. Taylor also says that Dunn's "earnest emotion exudes quiet desperation mixed with knowing acceptance."

=== Charts ===
"The Long Goodbye" debuted at number 53 on the U.S. Billboard Hot Country Singles & Tracks chart for the week of October 27, 2001, the same week that the duo's previous single "Only in America" was at number one.

==== Weekly charts ====
Chart (2001–2002)	Peak position
US Hot Country Songs (Billboard)	1
US Billboard Hot 100	39

==== Year-end charts ====
Chart (2002)	Position
US Country Songs (Billboard)	17

== Ronan Keating version ==
"The Long Goodbye"

Single by Ronan Keating

from the album Destination
- Released: 28 April 2003
- Studio: Various
- Length: 4:43 (album version); 4:18 (single version)
- Label: Polydor
- Songwriters: Ronan Keating; Paul Brady
- Producers: Calum MacColl; Liam Bradley; Stephen Lipson (single version)

Ronan Keating singles chronology
"We've Got Tonight" (2002)	"The Long Goodbye" (2003)	"Lost for Words" (2003)

"The Long Goodbye" was released as the fourth and last single from Irish singer-songwriter Ronan Keating's second studio album, Destination (2002). The album version was produced by Calum MacColl and Liam Bradley while the single version was produced by Stephen Lipson. The single peaked at number three on the UK Singles Chart, number 10 in Ireland, and reached the top 50 in Australia, Austria, Germany, and New Zealand.

=== Track listings ===
UK CD1

1. "The Long Goodbye"
2. "Love Won't Work (If We Don't Try)"
3. "This Is It"
4. "The Long Goodbye" (video)

UK CD2

1. "The Long Goodbye"
2. "We've Got Tonight" (featuring Jeanette)
3. "Love Won't Work (If We Don't Try)" (video)

European CD single

1. "The Long Goodbye"
2. "The Long Goodbye" (Bimbo Jones vocal mix)

=== Credits and personnel ===
Credits for the album version are lifted from the Destination album booklet.

Studios

- Recorded at various studios in Los Angeles, London, and Dublin
- Mixed at Olympic Studios (London, England)
- Engineered at Clonmannon Studios (County Wicklow, Ireland)
- Mastered at Gateway Mastering (Portland, Maine, US)

Personnel

- Ronan Keating – writing
- Paul Brady – writing
- Janet Ramus – background vocals
- Tracy Ackerman – background vocals
- Liam Bradley – backing vocals, drums, percussion, production
- Calum MacColl – backing vocals, guitar, production
- Steve Jones – guitar, programming
- Paul Turner – bass guitar
- James McNally – piano, bodhrán
- Kieran Kiely – piano, Hammond
- Yoad Nevo – programming
- Máire Breatnach – violin
- Fiachra Terence W. Trench – string arrangement
- Avril Mackintosh – additional vocal production
- Jeremy Wheatley – mixing
- Alastair McMillan – engineering
- Bob Ludwig – mastering

=== Charts ===
==== Weekly charts ====
Chart (2003)	Peak position
Australia (ARIA)	49
Austria (Ö3 Austria Top 40)	45
Belgium (Ultratip Bubbling Under Flanders)	4
Europe (Eurochart Hot 100)	10
Germany (GfK)	44
Ireland (IRMA)	10
Netherlands (Single Top 100)	74
New Zealand (Recorded Music NZ)	47
Romania (Romanian Top 100)	68
Scotland Singles (OCC)	2
Switzerland (Schweizer Hitparade)	70
UK Singles (OCC)	3
UK Airplay (Music Week)	17

==== Year-end charts ====
Chart (2003)	Position
UK Singles (OCC)	126

=== Release history ===
Region	Date	Format(s)	Label(s)	Ref.
Australia	28 April 2003	CD	Polydor	
United Kingdom	28 April 2003	CD; cassette	Polydor	
