= Every River =

Single by Brooks & Dunn

from the album Steers & Stripes
- Released: September 2, 2002
- Recorded: 2001
- Genre: Country
- Length: 3:29
- Label: Arista Nashville 69166
- Songwriters: Tom Littlefield; Angelo Petraglia; Kim Richey
- Producers: Kix Brooks; Ronnie Dunn; Mark Wright

Brooks & Dunn singles chronology
"My Heart Is Lost to You" (2002)	"Every River" (2002)	"Red Dirt Road" (2003)

"Every River" is a song written by American country music artist Kim Richey along with Angelo Petraglia and Tom Littlefield. First recorded by Richey on her 1997 album Bitter Sweet, it was later covered by duo Brooks & Dunn, who released it as the fifth and final single from the 2001 album Steers & Stripes. It entered the Billboard Hot Country Songs Chart on the week of September 7, 2002. It peaked at number 12 on the week of December 14, 2002. It was more recently covered by British band The Searchers. It was also covered by Irish singer and musician Maura O'Connell, who included it on her 2001 album Walls & Windows.

== Chart positions ==
"Every River" debuted at number 54 on the U.S. Billboard Hot Country Singles & Tracks chart for the week of September 7, 2002.

Chart (2002)	Peak position
US Hot Country Songs (Billboard)	12
US Billboard Hot 100	75
