= That's What It's All About =

Single by Brooks & Dunn

from the album The Greatest Hits Collection II
- Released: July 12, 2004
- Recorded: 2004
- Genre: Country
- Length: 4:00 (album version); 3:18 (single version)
- Label: Arista Nashville 82876-63224
- Songwriters: Steve McEwan; Craig Wiseman
- Producers: Mark Wright, Brooks & Dunn

Brooks & Dunn singles chronology
"That's What She Gets for Loving Me" (2004)	"That's What It's All About" (2004)	"It's Getting Better All the Time" (2004)

"That's What It's All About" is a song written by Steve McEwan and Craig Wiseman, and recorded by American country music duo Brooks & Dunn. It was released in July 2004 as the first single from their compilation album The Greatest Hits Collection II. It reached number 2 in the United States.

== Content ==
According to Ronnie Dunn, “It’s [about the] simple things, really. The more you learn, the more you figure out… the more you realize the lessons you learned growing up, the things you feel – that is what really matters. It’s easy to miss that, chasing after a career or whatever – and you do have to work hard in this world, there’s no way around it – but when that gets out of balance with your family, with your friends, with the things that matter… well, that’s what this song is about.”

== Music video ==
The music video was filmed during shots from various Brooks & Dunn concerts, and it was directed by Michael Salomon. It premiered in September 2004.

== Chart positions ==
The song debuted at number 52 on the U.S. Billboard Hot Country Songs for the week ending July 10, 2004.

Chart (2004)	Peak position
Canada Country (Radio & Records)	2
US Hot Country Songs (Billboard)	2
US Billboard Hot 100	38

=== Year-end charts ===
Chart (2004)	Position
US Country Songs (Billboard)	27
