= Red Dirt Road =

Studio album by Brooks & Dunn
- Released: July 15, 2003
- Genres: Country, honky-tonk
- Length: 56:59
- Label: Arista Nashville
- Producers: Kix Brooks, Ronnie Dunn, Mark Wright

Brooks & Dunn chronology
It Won't Be Christmas Without You (2002)	Red Dirt Road (2003)	The Greatest Hits Collection II (2004)

Singles from Red Dirt Road
- 1. "Red Dirt Road" Released: April 21, 2003; 2. "You Can't Take the Honky Tonk Out of the Girl" Released: September 15, 2003; 3. "That's What She Gets for Loving Me" Released: February 9, 2004

Professional ratings
Review scores
Source	Rating
Allmusic	4.5/5 stars
Rolling Stone	3/5 stars

Red Dirt Road is the ninth studio album by American country music duo Brooks & Dunn, released in 2003 on Arista Nashville. Certified platinum for sales of one million copies in the U.S., the album produced three top ten singles: "Red Dirt Road" (#1 on the Hot Country Songs chart), "You Can't Take the Honky-Tonk out of the Girl" (#3) and "That's What She Gets for Lovin' Me" (#6). It is considered a concept album showcasing the wide variety of musical styles that have influenced Brooks & Dunn.

== Background ==
"I knew we were going to call this album Red Dirt Road before the first song was even picked," said Ronnie Dunn. "I wanted that thread, that growing up in rural America and all the universal touchstones we all go through—that first beer, wrecking my first car two weeks after I got it, being taken to a revival by my cousins who lived a few miles farther down that road. That road ran through every major event in my young life… and who would think a kid growing up like that, going to Bible college, would end up here? But that's the power of life and roots and dreams—it can."

== Track listing ==
No.	Title	Writer(s)	Length
1.	"You Can't Take the Honky Tonk Out of the Girl"	Bob DiPiero, Bart Allmand	3:41
2.	"Caroline"	Ronnie Dunn, Charlie Crowe	3:49
3.	"When We Were Kings"	Kix Brooks, Gary Nicholson	4:12
4.	"That's What She Gets for Loving Me"	Dunn, Terry McBride	2:56
5.	"Red Dirt Road"	Brooks, Dunn	4:20
6.	"Feels Good Don't It"	Dunn, McBride	2:44
7.	"I Used to Know This Song by Heart"	Jerry Lynn Williams	4:27
8.	"Believer"	Dunn, Craig Wiseman	3:46
9.	"Memory Town"	Brooks, Rafe Van Hoy	4:04
10.	"She Was Born to Run"	Dunn, McBride, Kenny Beard	3:41
11.	"Til My Dyin' Day"	Brooks, Paul Nelson	3:03
12.	"My Baby's Everything I Love"	Brooks, Dunn, Don Cook	3:39
13.	"Good Day to Be Me"	Brooks, DiPiero	3:39
14.	"Good Cowboy"	Nile Rodgers, Jimmie Vaughan	4:23
15.	"Holy War (hidden track)"	Dunn	5:09

== Personnel ==
As listed in liner notes.

=== Brooks & Dunn ===
- Kix Brooks – lead vocals, background vocals
- Ronnie Dunn – lead vocals, background vocals, tambourine

=== Additional musicians ===
- Robert Bailey – background vocals
- Bekka Bramlett – background vocals
- Pat Buchanan – electric guitar
- Mark Casstevens – acoustic guitar
- Perry Coleman – background vocals
- J. T. Corenflos – electric guitar
- Charlie Crowe – electric guitar
- Eric Darken – percussion
- Jerry Douglas – Dobro
- Dan Dugmore – acoustic guitar, steel guitar, Dobro
- Shannon Forrest – drums
- Paul Franklin – steel guitar
- Kenny Greenberg – acoustic guitar, electric guitar
- Vicki Hampton – background vocals
- Aubrey Haynie – fiddle
- Wes Hightower – background vocals
- Jim Hoke – harmonica, accordion
- Clayton Ivey – piano
- John Jorgenson – electric guitar
- Bill Kenner – mandola
- B. James Lowry – acoustic guitar
- Brent Mason – electric guitar
- Steve Nathan – piano, keyboard, Wurlitzer, Mellotron, Hammond B-3 organ
- Michael Rhodes – bass guitar
- John Wesley Ryles – background vocals
- Harry Stinson – background vocals
- Bryan Sutton – acoustic guitar, banjo, mandolin, National guitar
- Crystal Taliefero – background vocals
- Russell Terrell – background vocals
- Lou Toomey – electric guitar
- Dan Tyminski – background vocals
- Christopher Willis – background vocals
- Dennis Wilson – background vocals
- Glenn Worf – bass guitar
- Mark Wright – tambourine, background vocals
- Reese Wynans – Hammond B-3 organ

Horns performed by Jeff Coffin, Jim Horn, Samuel Levine, and Steve Patrick, and arranged by Jim Horn.

== Chart performance ==
=== Weekly charts ===
Chart (2003)	Peak position
Australian Albums (ARIA Charts)	76
US Billboard 200	4
US Top Country Albums (Billboard)	1

=== Year-end charts ===
Chart (2003)	Position
US Billboard 200	149
US Top Country Albums (Billboard)	19

Chart (2004)	Position
US Billboard 200	147
US Top Country Albums (Billboard)	20

== Certifications ==
Region	Certification	Certified units/sales
Canada (Music Canada)	Gold	50,000^{^}
United States (RIAA)	Platinum	1,000,000^{^}
United States (RIAA) Video	Platinum	100,000^{^}
^{^} Shipments figures based on certification alone.
