= Steers & Stripes =

Studio album by Brooks & Dunn
- Released: April 17, 2001
- Genres: Neotraditional country; rock
- Length: 52:12
- Label: Arista Nashville
- Producers: Kix Brooks; Ronnie Dunn; Mark Wright

Brooks & Dunn chronology
Tight Rope (1999)	Steers & Stripes (2001)	It Won't Be Christmas Without You (2002)

Singles from Steers & Stripes
- 1. "Ain't Nothing 'bout You" Released: February 12, 2001; 2. "Only in America" Released: June 18, 2001; 3. "The Long Goodbye" Released: October 22, 2001; 4. "My Heart Is Lost to You" Released: April 8, 2002; 5. "Every River" Released: September 2, 2002

Professional ratings
Review scores
Source	Rating
AllMusic	4/5 stars
Rolling Stone	(favorable)

Steers & Stripes is the seventh studio album by American country music duo Brooks & Dunn. It was released in April 2001 via Arista Nashville. The album produced five singles on the US Billboard Hot Country Singles & Tracks chart, of which the first three reached number one. "Ain't Nothing 'bout You", the first single, became the duo's biggest hit, not only spending six weeks at the top of the country chart, but also reaching No. 25 on the Billboard Hot 100. The song was also declared by Billboard as the number-one country song of 2001. Following it were "Only in America" and "The Long Goodbye" (the latter of which was later a pop hit for Ronan Keating, co-written with Paul Brady). The last two singles were the No. 5 "My Heart Is Lost to You" and the No. 12 "Every River".

The track "The Last Thing I Do" was also recorded by James Otto for his debut album Days of Our Lives, and by Montgomery Gentry for their 2004 album You Do Your Thing (as "If It's the Last Thing I Do").

== Track listing ==
No.	Title	Writer(s)	Length
1.	"Only in America"	Kix Brooks, Don Cook, Ronnie Rogers	4:29
2.	"The Last Thing I Do"	David Lee Murphy, Kim Tribble	4:02
3.	"The Long Goodbye"	Paul Brady, Ronan Keating	3:51
4.	"Go West"	Brooks, Bob DiPiero	3:56
5.	"My Heart Is Lost to You"	Brett Beavers, Connie Harrington	2:59
6.	"Good Girls Go to Heaven"	Ronnie Dunn, Terry McBride, Shawn Camp	2:50
7.	"When She's Gone, She's Gone"	Tom Douglas, Wayland Holyfield	4:25
8.	"Ain't Nothing 'bout You"	Tom Shapiro, Rivers Rutherford	3:22
9.	"Unloved"	Steve Diamond, Keith Follesé	4:30
10.	"Deny, Deny, Deny"	Brooks, DiPiero	3:20
11.	"Lucky Me, Lonely You"	Dunn, McBride, Camp	3:24
12.	"I Fall"	Brooks, Don Cook	3:15
13.	"Every River"	Kim Richey, Angelo Petraglia, Tom Littlefield	3:29
14.	"See Jane Dance"	Charlie Crowe	4:12

== Chart performance ==
=== Weekly charts ===
Chart (2001)	Peak position
US Billboard 200	4
US Top Country Albums (Billboard)	1

=== Year-end charts ===
Chart (2001)	Position
Canadian Country Albums (Nielsen SoundScan)	14
US Billboard 200	145
US Top Country Albums (Billboard)	16

Chart (2002)	Position
Canadian Country Albums (Nielsen SoundScan)	29
US Billboard 200	146
US Top Country Albums (Billboard)	15

== Certifications ==
Region	Certification	Certified units/sales
Canada (Music Canada)	Platinum	100,000^{^}
United States (RIAA)	Platinum	1,000,000^{^}
^{^} Shipments figures based on certification alone.

== Personnel ==
- Bob Bailey – background vocals
- Kix Brooks – lead vocals, background vocals
- J. T. Corenflos – electric guitar
- Eric Darken – percussion
- Greg Davis – banjo
- Dan Dugmore – acoustic guitar, steel guitar
- Ronnie Dunn – lead vocals, background vocals
- Kim Fleming – background vocals
- Shannon Forrest – drums
- Paul Franklin – steel guitar, Dobro
- Kenny Greenberg – electric guitar
- Vicki Hampton – background vocals
- Aubrey Haynie – fiddle
- B. James Lowry – acoustic guitar
- Brent Mason – electric guitar, gut string guitar
- Mindi Abair – saxophone
- Gene Miller – background vocals
- Steve Nathan – keyboards, synthesizer, piano, Hammond B-3 organ
- Michael Rhodes – bass guitar
- Kim Richey – background vocals
- Chris Rodriguez – background vocals
- Brent Rowan – acoustic guitar, electric guitar
- John Wesley Ryles – background vocals
- Harry Stinson – background vocals
- Trisha Yearwood – background vocals

Strings by The Nashville String Machine arranged and conducted by David Campbell.
