= That's What She Gets for Loving Me =

Single by Brooks & Dunn

from the album Red Dirt Road
- Released: February 9, 2004
- Recorded: 2003
- Genre: Country
- Length: 2:56
- Label: Arista Nashville
- Songwriters: Ronnie Dunn; Terry McBride
- Producers: Kix Brooks; Ronnie Dunn; Mark Wright

Brooks & Dunn singles chronology
"You Can't Take the Honky Tonk Out of the Girl" (2003)	"That's What She Gets for Loving Me" (2004)	"That's What It's All About" (2004)

"That's What She Gets for Loving Me" is a song written by Ronnie Dunn and Terry McBride, and recorded by American country music duo Brooks & Dunn. It was released in February 2004 as the third and final single from their album Red Dirt Road. It peaked at number 6 in the United States.

== Chart positions ==
"That's What She Gets for Loving Me" debuted at number 50 on the U.S. Billboard Hot Country Singles & Tracks chart for the week of February 14, 2004.

Chart (2004)	Peak position
Canada Country (Radio & Records)	2
US Hot Country Songs (Billboard)	6
US Billboard Hot 100	53

=== Year-end charts ===
Chart (2004)	Position
US Country Songs (Billboard)	37
