= You Can't Take the Honky Tonk Out of the Girl =

Single by Brooks & Dunn

from the album Red Dirt Road
- Released: September 15, 2003
- Recorded: 2003
- Genre: Country
- Length: 3:41
- Label: Arista Nashville
- Songwriters: Bob DiPiero; Bart Allmand
- Producers: Kix Brooks; Ronnie Dunn; Mark Wright

Brooks & Dunn singles chronology
"Red Dirt Road" (2003)	"You Can't Take the Honky Tonk Out of the Girl" (2003)	"That's What She Gets for Loving Me" (2004)

"You Can't Take the Honky Tonk Out of the Girl" is a song written by Bob DiPiero and Bart Allmand, and recorded by American country music duo Brooks & Dunn. It was released in September 2003 as the second single from their album Red Dirt Road. It reached number 3 in early 2004 and spent five weeks there.

== Background and content ==
The song was inspired by a line from the film Sweet Home Alabama. "I just invented this story about this girl. The model for this story lives in Branson, Missouri, and she's that girl in the song", DiPiero told The Boot. "We just took off on this story and came up with this song. It's got a got a cool Keith Richards/country/rockin' thing that Brooks & Dunn do so well. The song just grew its own wings and flew up the charts."

== Composition ==
This up-tempo song accompanied by electric guitar and horn section is set in the key of F major. It has a main chord progression of F-C-B♭ and a vocal range of D_{4}-C_{6}.

== Music video ==
The music video was directed by Michael Salomon, and features actress Marilu Henner as the mother of the bride. Filmed in Los Angeles over two days, it begins with a plane touching down beneath the Hollywood sign (except it reads "HonkyTonk" instead of "Hollywood"). The duo are performing the song with their band in front of the sign, with blue strobe lights illuminating the sky. The rest of the video visually retells the song's lyrics, with various subtitles displaying certain aspects of the plot. While the lyrics to the song imply that Connie ran off with the groom, the music video shows Connie dressed as the bride with the real bride and groom having eloped to Cancun, as mentioned in the third verse. It ends with a postscript reading "Dedicated to All Wild Women".

Ronnie Dunn wears a Johnny Cash shirt in the video. Although Dunn had not intended the shirt to be worn as a tribute, Cash died three days before the single's release.

== Chart positions ==
"You Can't Take the Honky Tonk Out of the Girl" debuted at number 60 on the U.S. Billboard Hot Country Singles & Tracks chart for the week of September 20, 2003.

Chart (2003–2004)	Peak position
US Hot Country Songs (Billboard)	3
US Billboard Hot 100	39

=== Year-end charts ===
Chart (2004)	Position
US Country Songs (Billboard)	43
