= My Heart Is Lost to You =

Single by Brooks & Dunn

from the album Steers & Stripes
- Released: April 8, 2002
- Recorded: 2001
- Genre: Country
- Length: 2:59
- Label: Arista Nashville 69138
- Songwriters: Brett Beavers; Connie Harrington
- Producers: Kix Brooks; Ronnie Dunn; Mark Wright

Brooks & Dunn singles chronology
"The Long Goodbye" (2001)	"My Heart Is Lost to You" (2002)	"Every River" (2002)

"My Heart Is Lost to You" is a song written by Connie Harrington and Brett Beavers, and recorded by the American country music duo Brooks & Dunn. It was released in April 2002 as the fourth single from their album Steers & Stripes. It peaked at number 5 on the Billboard Hot Country Songs chart.

== Music video ==
The music video is set in a desert with two cars, and a man and a woman dancing. The video was directed by Shaun Silva.

== Chart positions ==
"My Heart Is Lost to You" debuted at number 57 on the U.S. Billboard Hot Country Singles & Tracks chart for the week of April 13, 2002.

Chart (2002)	Peak position
US Hot Country Songs (Billboard)	5
US Billboard Hot 100	48

=== Year-end charts ===
Chart (2002)	Position
US Country Songs (Billboard)	44
