= Only in America (Brooks & Dunn song) =

2001 single by Brooks & Dunn

Single by Brooks & Dunn

from the album Steers & Stripes
- B-side: "The Long Goodbye"
- Released: June 18, 2001
- Genre: Country rock
- Length: 3:41 (single version); 4:29 (album version)
- Label: Arista Nashville 69130
- Songwriters: Kix Brooks; Don Cook; Ronnie Rogers
- Producers: Kix Brooks; Ronnie Dunn; Mark Wright

Brooks & Dunn singles chronology
| "Ain't Nothing 'bout You" (2001) | "Only in America" (2001) | "The Long Goodbye" (2001) |

"Only in America" is a song recorded by American country music duo Brooks & Dunn. It was released in June 2001 as the second single from the album Steers & Stripes. Kix Brooks, one-half of the duo, co-wrote the song with Don Cook and Ronnie Rogers. "Only in America" was also the second of three consecutive number one hits from that album, reaching its peak on the Billboard Hot Country Singles & Tracks (now Hot Country Songs) charts for the week of October 27, 2001.

== Content ==
"Only in America" is an up-tempo in the keys of E and F major (the song transposes upward before the final chorus), accompanied largely by electric guitar. Its lyrics outline the lives of various people across the United States — a school bus driver and her bus full of children in the first verse, and a pair of newlyweds (a 'welder's son and a banker's daughter') in their limousine in the second verse — before observing in the chorus that "only in America" do such people "get to dream as big as [they] want to".

== Critical reception ==
Although the song was recorded and released less than three months prior to the September 11 attacks, Brooks feels that the song got grouped in with other, similarly patriotic songs which were released in response to the attacks. The song was also featured in the beginning of the Oliver Stone film World Trade Center. Rolling Stone reviewer Andrew Dansby described the song was an "advertisement waiting to happen". Chris Neal of Country Weekly called the song a "flag-waving opener" to Steers & Stripes, but nonetheless made note of the song's "rock-solid riff".

The song has been used extensively in campaigns for both political parties. It was used frequently during president George W. Bush's 2004 re-election campaign. John Kerry also had it played at the Democratic National Convention in 2004. The song also played when Obama announced Joe Biden as his vice president in Springfield, Illinois in 2008. It was also featured after Democratic presidential candidate Barack Obama's acceptance speech in Denver on August 28, 2008, and has been used at campaign events in Obama's 2012 reelection campaign.

"Only in America" was used often in campaign events for Newt Gingrich in his bid to receive the 2012 Republican Presidential Nomination. Scott Walker (R-WI) also used the song after his first speech when he survived a gubernatorial recall on June 5, 2012. Mitt Romney also uses the song in many of his political rallies. When Ted Cruz dropped out of the 2016 primaries, he closed his announcement with this song.

Towards the end of the 2016 election, Republican nominee Donald Trump used the song for various rallies.

"Only in America" was the first song to be heard on KKGO in Los Angeles when that station launched its current country music format on February 26, 2007.

== Music video ==
The video was released June 18, 2001. It was directed by Michael Merriman and edited by Scott Mele. It incorporated live concert footage with scenes of every day Americans going about their day in a fitting tribute to the melting pot America represents.

== In the news ==
On July 28, 2023, former president Donald Trump took the stage at a presidential primary event hosted by the Republican National Party in Des Moines, Iowa, while "Only in America" played. Trump's appearance at the podium coincided with the lyrics "One could end up going to prison, one just might be President." Although all 13 candidates at the event walked out to the same song, Trump's legal perils made the news media as well as social media take note of the irony. This event occurred just a day after three additional charges for obstruction were announced in the Department of Justice probe into Trump's illegal possession of classified documents at Mar-a-Lago. Fox News reported that "Twitter users were quick to point out the lyrics" and provided examples of Republican officials and GOP strategist's Tweets on the subject.

== Chart positions ==
"Only in America" debuted at number 54 on the U.S. Billboard Hot Country Singles & Tracks chart for the week of June 23, 2001.

| Chart (2001) | Peak position |
|---|---|
| US Hot Country Songs (Billboard) | 1 |
| US Billboard Hot 100 | 33 |

=== Year-end charts ===
| Chart (2001) | Position |
|---|---|
| US Country Songs (Billboard) | 14 |

== Certifications ==
| Region | Certification | Certified units/sales |
|---|---|---|
| United States (RIAA) | Gold | 500,000^{‡} |
^{‡} Sales+streaming figures based on certification alone.

== Parodies ==
- American country music parody artist Cledus T. Judd released a parody of "Only in America" titled "Don't Mess With America" on his 2002 album Cledus Envy.
