= Ain't Nothing 'bout You =

Single by Brooks & Dunn

from the album Steers & Stripes
- B-side: "Husbands and Wives"
- Released: February 12, 2001
- Recorded: 2001
- Genre: Country pop; country rock
- Length: 3:22
- Label: Arista Nashville 69048
- Songwriters: Rivers Rutherford; Tom Shapiro
- Producers: Kix Brooks; Ronnie Dunn; Mark Wright

Brooks & Dunn singles chronology
"You'll Always Be Loved by Me" (2000)	"Ain't Nothing 'bout You" (2001)	"Only in America" (2001)

"Ain't Nothing 'bout You" is a song written by Tom Shapiro and Rivers Rutherford and recorded by American country music duo Brooks & Dunn. It was released on February 12, 2001, as the first single from Brooks & Dunn’s album Steers & Stripes. The song was nominated by the Country Music Association for Single of the Year. It spent six consecutive weeks as the No. 1 song on the US Country chart, and eventually ranked as the chart's No. 1 song of 2001. It also reached No. 25 on the Billboard Hot 100 chart and ranked No. 71 for the year on that chart.

In 2019, Brooks & Dunn re-recorded "Ain't Nothing 'bout You" with American country music artist Brett Young for their album Reboot. In 2024, they re-recorded the song once again for their album Reboot II, this time featuring Megan Moroney.

== Critical reception ==
Chuck Taylor, of Billboard magazine reviewed the song favorably calling it "a sultry, hook-laden tune that finds Ronnie Dunn in fine vocal form." He says that this single represents a departure from Brooks & Dunn's signature honky-tonk style.

== Cover versions ==
Country/pop music singer Taylor Swift covered the song from The Last Rodeo Tour.

== Music video ==
The music video was released in March 2001. It was directed by Trey Fanjoy and features a model (then-unknown Alana de la Garza of Law & Order fame) as the central character. It was shot in an abandoned warehouse, and shot in green. It was also the only video by the duo to be directed by Fanjoy. Throughout the video, the model is seen in different layouts. The duo are seen performing with a full band on a high platform and in front of a screen, projecting the model's scenes. The model is also seen poking her head through thin blinds in both the first and last images of the video.

== Chart positions ==
"Ain't Nothing 'bout You" debuted at No. 48 on the U.S. Billboard Hot Country Singles & Tracks chart for the week of February 17, 2001.

Chart (2001)	Peak position
US Hot Country Songs (Billboard)	1
US Billboard Hot 100	25

=== Year-end charts ===
Year-end chart performance for "Ain't Nothing 'bout You"
Chart (2001)	Position
Canada Radio (Nielsen BDS)	91
US Country Songs (Billboard)	1
US Billboard Hot 100	71

== Certifications ==
Region	Certification	Certified units/sales
United States (RIAA)	2× Platinum	2,000,000^{‡}
^{‡} Sales+streaming figures based on certification alone.
