= US Media Studios =

US Media Studios (formerly United States Media Television, a.k.a. USMTV) is a multimedia production company, based in Coral Springs, Florida. It specializes in television programs such as Today in America with Terry Bradshaw, The Art of Living with Marilu Henner, and Going Green with Ward Burton.

US Media Studios produces television shows about various topics from Green energy to global business practices in agriculture, biotechnology, and telecommunications. The company's various television shows air on major cable networks including Ion Television, Fox Business, and Bloomberg Television. US Media Studios also produces original corporate promotional videos and websites. They offer a variety of production and consulting services such as advertising, corporate marketing, promotions, educational programming, and internet marketing.

US Media Studios has won numerous awards for its production values, script writing, show themes, and more. In 2010, US Media Studios won 9 Telly Awards.
