= Red Dirt Road (song) =

Single by Brooks & Dunn

from the album Red Dirt Road
- Released: April 21, 2003
- Genre: Country
- Length: 4:20 (album version); 3:55 (single version)
- Label: Arista Nashville
- Songwriters: Kix Brooks; Ronnie Dunn
- Producers: Kix Brooks; Ronnie Dunn; Mark Wright

Brooks & Dunn singles chronology
"Every River" (2002)	"Red Dirt Road" (2003)	"You Can't Take the Honky Tonk Out of the Girl" (2003)

"Red Dirt Road" is a song written and recorded by American country music duo Brooks & Dunn. It was released in April 2003 as the first single and title track from their album of the same name. "Red Dirt Road" serves a summation of small-town values and the experiences that shape you. The song was a domestic chart-topper; it scored the duo their eighteenth number one hit on Billboard's Hot Country Songs ranking; it was also a top-25 single on the all-genre Hot 100, and ranked as one of its top overall hits for 2003. The duo performed the single at the tribute concert for Dale Earnhardt at the Daytona International Speedway in July 2003. In 2019, Brooks & Dunn re-recorded "Red Dirt Road" with American country music artist Cody Johnson for their album Reboot.

== Background ==
In their many years as a performing duo, Brooks and Dunn spent plenty of time discussing their upbringing. In 2002, the musicians were touring the U.S. when they found themselves reminiscing in their spare time between stops. Their two hometowns of Shreveport, Louisiana, and El Dorado, Arkansas, shared similar values and culture. Both recalled vividly how red the soil in those states are. In the midst of recording their latest studio effort, Dunn proposed Red Dirt Road as its title, given his desire to "reel everything into a concept". After a flight to Sacramento, California, for their next concert, Dunn shared the song’s chorus to Brooks, written on a cocktail napkin. Both agreed it was a promising start, and boarded their respective buses and continued writing, with Brooks roughing out the verses and music. The next morning, the two reconvened and shared their progress; they joked that it looked like "a bomb had gone off" in Brooks’s bus due to his frenetic pace. "He was just beat man, like he'd been up for two days," Dunn laughed. Brooks likened the feeling to a strike of lightning, following the inspiration as it hit.

The duo showed their new piece to producer Mark Wright, who responded positively. The song was recorded at the Sound Kitchen and House of Gain in Nashville, Tennessee, by Greg Droman. Its anthemic guitar riff was developed by Kenny Greenberg, who was simply improvising at the session. After the song’s completion, both Brooks and Dunn felt like the song was a pinnacle of their career; something that had worked toward a long time. Dunn felt that its lyrics have more meaning than standard country fare. Both agreed that over ten years into their career the song breathed new life into their partnership, which they agreed was waning slightly due to their relentless pace.

== Content ==
The song finds a narrator reflecting on joyful memories linked to a red dirt road near where he grew up. The song opens its central guitar riff, followed by its first verse where Dunn sets the scene: a small community off of Rural Route Three, which he would traverse to church and back. In an interview, Dunn revealed these details were entirely autobiographical: he came up on the real Rural Route Three, a four-mile stretch east of El Dorado. The narrator observes a girl next door named Mary, with whom he falls in love. Throughout the song's chorus, the narrator recounts his formative experiences: drinking for the first time, becoming religious, and wrecking his car. He surmises that "happiness on Earth ain't just for high achievers".

In the second verse, he recalls sneaking out late at night to take moonlit drives along the back country path. In the tune’s final verse, it is revealed the narrator left his hometown to see the world, and lost his relationship with Mary along the way, but they have reconciled. When asked to explain the song's message, Dunn replied, ""Red dirt road is just symbolic of [formative] experiences ... there's that end where you start, you end down there and between here and there is life."

== Cover versions ==
Country music group Sugarland covered the song from The Last Rodeo Tour.

== Music video ==
The video features the duo singing in a truck, in front of a church, and along the dirt road. It was directed by Steven Goldmann and edited by Scott Mele. The video was shot on film and the textural, mosaic effects throughout were created in the editing and post production process. It was released on May 8, 2003.

== Chart positions ==
"Red Dirt Road" debuted at No. 57 on the U.S. Billboard Hot Country Singles & Tracks chart for the week of April 19, 2003.

Chart (2003)	Peak position
US Hot Country Songs (Billboard)	1
US Billboard Hot 100	25

=== Year-end charts ===
Chart (2003)	Position
US Country Songs (Billboard)	5
US Billboard Hot 100	86

== Certifications ==
Region	Certification	Certified units/sales
Canada (Music Canada)	2× Platinum	160,000^{‡}
United States (RIAA)	3× Platinum	3,000,000^{‡}
^{‡} Sales+streaming figures based on certification alone.
