= Martina McBride discography =

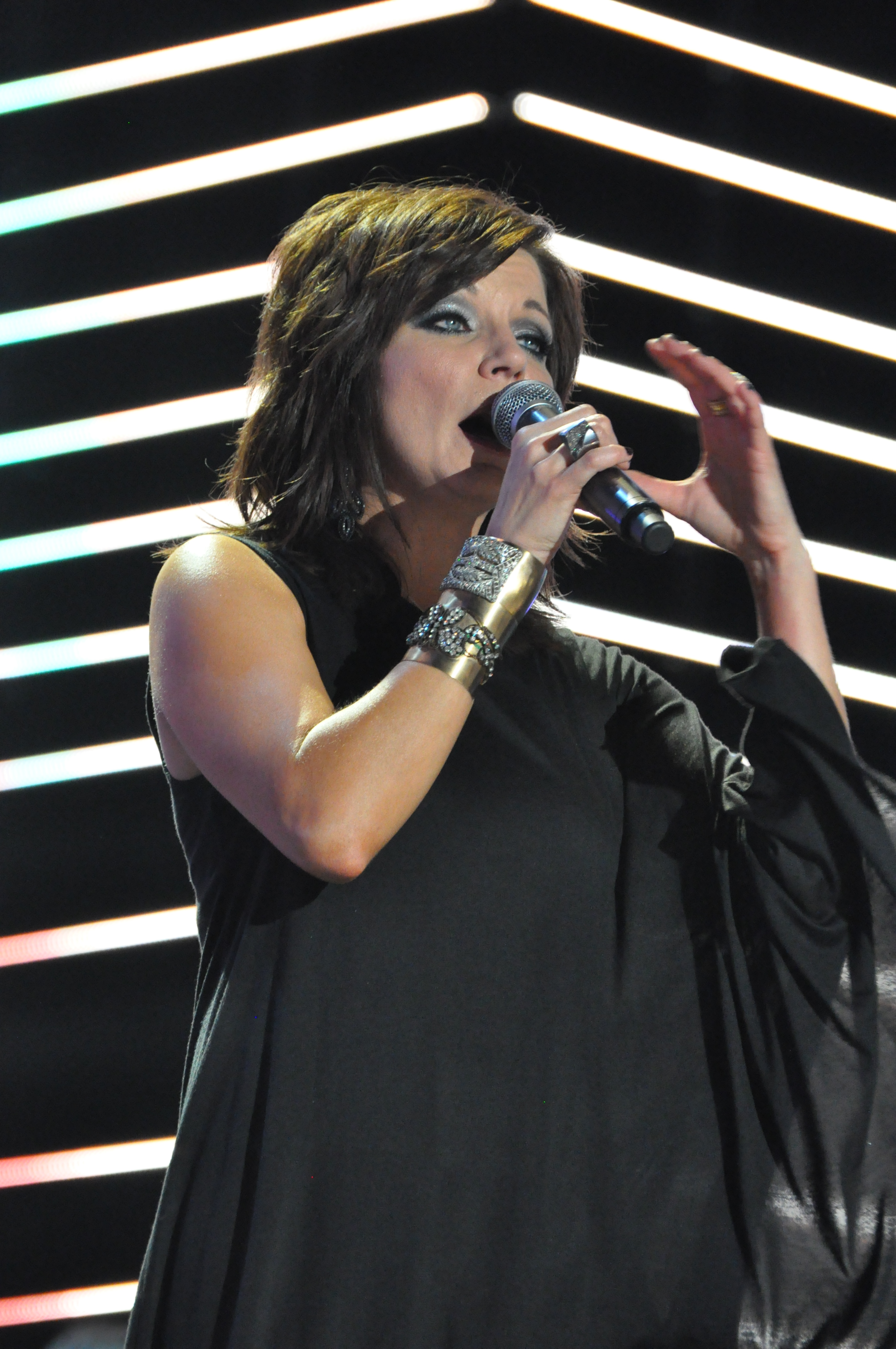
- Martina McBride in concert, 2010.
- Studio albums: 14
- Live albums: 1
- Compilation albums: 8
- Singles: 51
- Video albums: 3
- Music videos: 45
- Other albums: 3
- Other charted songs: 16
- Other appearances: 45

The discography of American country music artist Martina McBride consists of 14 studio albums, one live album, eight compilation albums, three video albums, three additional albums, 45 music videos, 51 singles, 16 other charting songs and 45 album appearances. In 1991, she signed a recording contract with RCA Nashville, launching her debut studio album The Time Has Come in 1992. In September 1993, her second studio album The Way That I Am was issued. Its lead single "My Baby Loves Me" reached number 2 on the Billboard Hot Country Songs chart, becoming her breakthrough hit. The third single "Independence Day" peaked in the Top 20 and became McBride's signature song. The song's success elevated sales of The Way That I Am to platinum status from the Recording Industry Association of America. Wild Angels was released in September 1995 and reached number seventeen on the Billboard Top Country Albums chart. The album's title track became McBride's first song to top the Hot Country Songs chart. McBride's fourth studio album Evolution was released in August 1997 and is her best-selling album to date, certifying three times platinum in the United States. The album spawned six singles which all became major hits including, "A Broken Wing", "Wrong Again", and "Whatever You Say". After releasing a holiday album, McBride's fifth studio album Emotion was issued in September 1999. The lead single "I Love You" topped the Hot Country Songs chart, while also reaching minor positions on the Adult Contemporary and Billboard Hot 100 charts.

In 2001, McBride released her first Greatest Hits project, becoming her first album to top the Top Country Albums chart. All four of the album's new tracks were single releases including the number one single "Blessed". Martina (2003) certified double platinum in the United States and featured the top 5 singles "This One's for the Girls" and "In My Daughter's Eyes". McBride's seventh studio album entitled Timeless (2005) contained a series of classic country songs, debuting atop the country albums chart and the top ten of the Billboard 200. In 2007, McBride returned with her eighth studio record entitled Waking Up Laughing, which debuted in the top five of the Billboard country albums chart and Billboard 200. The album featured original songwriting material by McBride herself, including "Anyway", the album's lead single. After recording a live album in 2008, McBride's next studio album entitled Shine (2009) was issued. The album spawned three singles that reached the Top 20 on the country songs chart. Switching to Republic Nashville, Eleven was released in October 2011. Debuting at number 4 on the country albums chart, the album's second single "I'm Gonna Love You Through It" became a major hit in 2012. Under the production of Don Was, McBride released her twelfth studio record Everlasting (2014) that featured covers of R&B songs. Since her debut, Martina McBride has sold over 14 million albums, according to the Recording Industry Association of America.

== Albums ==
=== Studio albums ===
List of albums, with selected chart positions and certifications, showing other relevant details
Title	Album details	Peak chart positions					Certifications
Title	Album details	US	US Cou.	CAN	CAN Cou.	UK	Certifications
The Time Has Come	Released: May 12, 1992; Label: RCA Nashville; Formats: Cassette, CD, music download	—	49	—	21	—	
The Way That I Am	Released: September 14, 1993; Label: RCA Nashville; Formats: Cassette, CD, music download	106	14	—	8	—	RIAA: Platinum; MC: Platinum
Wild Angels	Released: September 26, 1995; Label: RCA Nashville; Formats: Cassette, CD, music download	77	17	—	4	—	RIAA: Platinum; MC: Platinum
Evolution	Released: August 26, 1997; Label: RCA Nashville; Formats: Cassette, CD, music download	24	4	80	7	178	RIAA: 3× Platinum; MC: Platinum
White Christmas	Released: September 29, 1998; Label: RCA Nashville; Formats: Cassette, CD, music download	64	9	—	—	—	RIAA: 2× Platinum; MC: Gold
Emotion	Released: September 14, 1999; Label: RCA Nashville; Formats: Cassette, CD, music download	19	3	66	5	—	RIAA: Platinum; MC: Platinum
Martina	Released: September 30, 2003; Label: RCA Nashville; Formats: Cassette, CD, music download	7	1	—	—	—	RIAA: 2× Platinum
Timeless	Released: October 18, 2005; Label: RCA Nashville; Formats: CD, music download	3	1	—	—	—	RIAA: Platinum; MC: Platinum
Waking Up Laughing	Released: April 3, 2007; Label: RCA Nashville; Formats: CD, music download	4	2	—	—	—	RIAA: Gold
Shine	Released: March 24, 2009; Label: RCA Nashville; Formats: CD, music download	10	1	—	—	182	
Eleven	Released: October 11, 2011; Label: Republic Nashville; Formats: CD, music download	10	4	—	—	—	
Everlasting	Released: April 8, 2014; Label: Kobalt/Vinyl; Formats: Vinyl, CD, music download	7	1	—	—	—	
Reckless	Released: April 29, 2016; Label: Nash Icon; Formats: CD, music download	31	2	87	—	—	
It's the Holiday Season	Released: October 19, 2018; Label: Broken Bow Records; Formats: CD, music download	—	—	—	—	—	
"—" denotes a recording that did not chart or was not released in that territory.

=== Live albums ===
List of albums, with selected chart positions, showing other relevant details
Title	Album details	Peak chart positions	
Title	Album details	US	US Cou.
Live in Concert	Released: April 29, 2008; Label: RCA Nashville; Formats: CD, DVD, music download	112	19

=== Compilation albums ===
List of albums, with selected chart positions and certifications, showing other relevant details
Title	Album details	Peak chart positions		Certifications / Sales
Title	Album details	US	US Cou.	Certifications / Sales
Greatest Hits	Released: September 18, 2001; Label: RCA Nashville; Formats: Cassette, CD, music download	5	1	RIAA: 4× Platinum; MC: Gold
Playlist: The Very Best of Martina McBride	Released: December 16, 2008; Label: RCA Nashville; Formats: CD	—	—	
Super Hits	Released: September 14, 2010; Label: Legacy; Formats: CD	—	—	
Hits and More	Released: January 17, 2012; Label: RCA Nashville; Formats: CD, music download	47	11	
Country: Martina McBride	Released: September 8, 2012; Label: Legacy; Formats: CD	—	—	
The Essential Martina McBride	Released: October 23, 2012; Label: RCA Nashville/Legacy; Formats: CD, music download	—	—	
The Classic Christmas Album	Released: October 8, 2013; Label: RCA Nashville/Legacy; Formats: CD, music download	177	27	
Greatest Hits: The RCA Years	Released: August 20, 2021; Label: RCA Nashville/Legacy/Sony; Formats: LP	—	—	
"—" denotes a recording that did not chart or was not released in that territory.

=== Other albums ===
List of albums, with selected chart positions, showing other relevant details
Title	Album details	Peak chart positions	
Title	Album details	US Cou.	CAN Cou.
CMT Girls' Night Out (with Sara Evans, Mindy McCready, and Lorrie Morgan)	Released: October 12, 1999; Label: BNA; Formats: CD	30	8
Martina on Target (Note: On Target was only available for a limited time at Target stores, and featured the exclusive song "Being Myself".)	Released: 2004; Label: RCA Nashville; Formats: CD	—	—
My Heart (Note: My Heart was only available for a limited time at Hallmark stores, and featured the exclusive songs "At Last" and "Together Again".)	Released: 2005; Label: Hallmark; Formats: CD	—	—
"—" denotes a recording that did not chart or was not released in that territory.

== Singles ==
=== As lead artist ===
List of singles, with selected chart positions and certifications, showing other relevant details
Title	Year	Peak chart positions								Certifications	Album
Title	Year	US	US Cou.	US AC	AUS	CAN Cou.	CAN AC	GER	ITA	Certifications	Album
"The Time Has Come"	1992	—	23	—	—	11	—	—	—		The Time Has Come
"That's Me"	1992	—	43	—	—	44	—	—	—		The Time Has Come
"Cheap Whiskey"	1992	—	44	—	—	47	—	—	—		The Time Has Come
"My Baby Loves Me"	1993	—	2	—	—	1	—	—	—		The Way That I Am
"Life #9"	1993	—	6	—	—	8	—	—	—		The Way That I Am
"Independence Day"	1994	—	12	—	—	14	—	—	—	RIAA: Platinum	The Way That I Am
"Heart Trouble"	1994	—	21	—	—	32	—	—	—		The Way That I Am
"Where I Used to Have a Heart"	1995	—	49	—	—	—	—	—	—		The Way That I Am
"Safe in the Arms of Love"	1995	—	4	—	—	38	—	—	—		Wild Angels
"Wild Angels"	1995	—	1	—	—	5	—	—	—		Wild Angels
"Phones Are Ringin' All Over Town"	1996	—	28	—	—	24	—	—	—		Wild Angels
"Swingin' Doors"	1996	—	38	—	—	41	—	—	—		Wild Angels
"Cry on the Shoulder of the Road"	1996	—	26	—	—	42	—	—	—		Wild Angels
"Still Holding On" (with Clint Black)	1997	—	11	—	—	1	50	—	—		Evolution
"A Broken Wing"	1997	61	1	—	—	17	—	—	—	RIAA: Gold	Evolution
"Valentine" (with Jim Brickman) (Note: ' "Valentine" originally appeared on Jim Brickman's 1997 album Picture This was released as a single to adult contemporary radio. In 1998, it was remixed and released to country radio, serving as the B-side to McBride's 1997 single "A Broken Wing". The new version appeared on her 1997 album Evolution.)	1998	50	9	—	—	14	—	—	—		Evolution
"Happy Girl"	1998	—	2	—	—	4	—	—	—		Evolution
"Wrong Again"	1998	36	1	—	—	5	—	—	—		Evolution
"Whatever You Say"	1999	37	2	—	—	6	—	—	—		Evolution
"I Love You"	1999	24	1	21	38	1	20	79	21		Emotion
"Love's the Only House"	1999	42	3	—	—	2	—	—	—		Emotion
"There You Are"	2000	60	10	15	—	—	—	—	—		Emotion
"It's My Time"	2000	— (Note: "It's My Time" did not enter the Hot 100, but peaked at number 2 on Bubbling Under Hot 100 Singles, which acts as a 25-song extension of the Hot 100.)	11	—	—	—	—	—	—		Emotion
"When God-Fearin' Women Get the Blues"	2001	64	8	—	—	—	—	—	—		Greatest Hits
"Blessed"	2001	31	1	—	—	—	—	—	—		Greatest Hits
"Where Would You Be"	2002	45	3	—	—	—	—	—	—		Greatest Hits
"Concrete Angel"	2002	47	5	—	—	—	—	—	—	RIAA: Platinum	Greatest Hits
"This One's for the Girls"	2003	39	3	1	—	—	—	—	—	RIAA: Platinum	Martina
"In My Daughter's Eyes"	2003	39	4	3	—	—	—	—	—	RIAA: Gold	Martina
"How Far"	2004	68	12	—	—	—	—	—	—		Martina
"God's Will"	2004	85	16	—	—	—	—	—	—		Martina
"(I Never Promised You A) Rose Garden"	2005	98	18	—	—	—	—	—	—		Timeless
"I Still Miss Someone" (featuring Dolly Parton)	2006	—	50	—	—	—	—	—	—		Timeless
"Anyway"	2006	32	5	14	—	9	—	—	—	RIAA: Gold	Waking Up Laughing
"How I Feel"	2007	— (Note: "How I Feel" did not enter the Hot 100, but peaked at number 8 on Bubbling Under Hot 100 Singles, which acts as a 25-song extension of the Hot 100.)	15	—	—	28	—	—	—		Waking Up Laughing
"For These Times"	2007	—	35	—	—	—	—	—	—		Waking Up Laughing
"Ride"	2008	82	11	—	—	22	—	—	—		Shine
"I Just Call You Mine"	2009	97	18	—	—	31	—	—	—		Shine
"Wrong Baby Wrong"	2010	74	11	—	—	18	—	—	—		Shine
"Teenage Daughters"	2011	100	17	—	—	33	—	—	—		Eleven
"I'm Gonna Love You Through It"	2011	61	4	—	—	28	—	—	—		Eleven
"Marry Me" (featuring Pat Monahan)	2012	—	45	—	—	—	—	—	—		Eleven
"Reckless"	2016	—	— (Note: "Reckless" did not enter the Hot Country Songs chart, but peaked at number 47 on Country Airplay.)	—	—	—	—	—	—		Reckless
"Just Around the Corner"	2016	—	—	—	—	—	—	—	—		Reckless
"Girls Like Me"	2020	—	—	—	—	—	—	—	—		—N/a
"—" denotes a recording that did not chart or was not released in that territory.

=== As guest artist ===
List of singles, with selected chart positions, showing other relevant details
Title	Year	Peak chart positions							Album
Title	Year	US	US Cou.	US Cou. Air.	US AC	CAN Cou.	CAN AC	AUS	Album
"Valentine" (Jim Brickman with Martina McBride)	1997	50	53	—	3	—	16	—	Picture This
"This Small Divide" (Jason Sellers with Martina McBride)	1998	—	55	—	—	—	—	—	I'm Your Man
"Chances Are" (with Bob Seger)	1998	—	—	—	23	70	40	—	Hope Floats: Music from the Motion Picture
"America the Beautiful" (credited as Various Artists)	2001	—	58	—	—	—	—	—	—N/a
"Words Are Your Wheels" (credited as Phil Vassar and Friends) (Note: "Words Are Your Wheels" was a promotional single featuring Brooks & Dunn, Kenny Chesney, Sara Evans, Phil Vassar, and McBride.)	2002	—	—	—	—	—	—	—	—N/a
"Practice Life" (Andy Griggs with Martina McBride)	2002	—	33	—	—	—	—	—	Freedom
"Trip Around the Sun" (Jimmy Buffett with Martina McBride)	2004	— (Note: "Trip Around the Sun" did not enter the Hot 100, but peaked at number 12 on Bubbling Under Hot 100 Singles, which acts as a 25-song extension of the Hot 100.)	20	—	—	—	—	—	License to Chill
"Care" (Kid Rock with Martina McBride and T.I.)	2011	—	58	—	26	—	—	—	Born Free
"Forever Country" (credited as Artists of Then, Now & Forever)	2016	21	1	33	—	—	—	26	—N/a
"—" denotes a recording that did not chart or was not released in that territory.

== Other charted songs ==
List of songs, with selected chart positions, showing other relevant details
Title	Year	Peak chart positions		Album
Title	Year	US Cou.	US AC	Album
"O Holy Night"	1997	74	—	White Christmas
"O Holy Night"	1998	67	—	White Christmas
"O Holy Night"	1999	49	—	White Christmas
"Have Yourself a Merry Little Christmas"	1999	54	—	White Christmas
"Let It Snow! Let It Snow! Let It Snow!"	1999	64	—	White Christmas
"White Christmas"	2000	75	—	White Christmas
"Have Yourself a Merry Little Christmas" (re-entry)	2000	53	—	White Christmas
"O Holy Night" (re-entry)	2000	57	—	White Christmas
"Let It Snow! Let It Snow! Let It Snow!" (re-entry)	2000	73	—	White Christmas
"Have Yourself a Merry Little Christmas" (re-entry)	2001	59	—	White Christmas
"White Christmas" (re-entry)	2001	62	—	White Christmas
"O Holy Night" (re-entry)	2001	41	—	White Christmas
"The Christmas Song" (re-entry)	2001	67	—	White Christmas
"Baby It's Cold Outside" (with Dean Martin)	2006	35	7	Christmas with Dino
"Blue Christmas" (with Elvis Presley)	2008	36	22	Christmas Duets
"Please Come Home for Christmas"	2011	51	—	The Country Christmas Collection
"It's Beginning to Look a Lot Like Christmas"	2019	—	21	It's the Holiday Season
"—" denotes a recording that did not chart or was not released in that territory.

== Videography ==
=== Video albums ===
List of video albums, showing all relevant details
Title	Album details
Greatest Hits	Released: 2001; Label: RCA Nashville; Formats: DVD
Martina	Released: September 30, 2003; Label: RCA Nashville; Formats: DVD
CMT Crossroads: Train and Martina McBride (with Train)	Released: July 12, 2011; Label: Universal Republic; Formats: DVD

=== Music videos ===
==== As lead artist ====
List of music videos, showing year released and director
Title	Year	Director
"The Time Has Come"	1992	Kate Ryan
"That's Me"	1992	Adam Kimmel
"Cheap Whiskey"	1992	Steven Goldmann
"My Baby Loves Me"	1993	Steven Goldmann
"Life #9"	1994	Steven Goldmann
"Independence Day"	1994	Deaton Flanigen
"Where I Used to Have a Heart"	1995	Steven Goldmann
"Safe in the Arms of Love"	1995	Steven Goldmann
"Wild Angels"	1995	Thom Oliphant
"Swingin' Doors"	1996	—N/a
"Cry on the Shoulder of the Road"	1997	Jim Hershleder
"A Broken Wing"	1997	Deaton Flanigen
"White Christmas"	1998	Bud Schaetzle
"Whatever You Say"	1999	Deaton Flanigen
"I Love You"	1999	Gerry Wenner
"Love's the Only House"	1999	Thom Oliphant
"There You Are"	2000	—N/a
"When God-Fearin' Women Get the Blues"	2001	Steven Goldmann
"Blessed"	2001	Deaton Flanigen
"Where Would You Be"	2002	Morris Abraham
"Concrete Angel"	2002	Deaton Flanigen
"This One's for the Girls"	2003	Deaton Flanigen
"In My Daughter's Eyes"	2003	Michael McNamara
"How Far"	2004	Trey Fanjoy
"God's Will"	2004	Deaton Flanigen
"Anyway"	2007	Deaton Flanigen
"How I Feel"	2007	Gary Halverson
"For These Times"	2007	Sam Erickson
"Ride"	2009	Kristin Barlowe
"I Just Call You Mine"	2009	Theresa Wingert
"Wrong Baby Wrong"	2010	Theresa Wingert
"A Broken Wing" (with Train)	2010	Jonathan Beswick
"Teenage Daughters" (studio version)	2011	Becky Fluke
"Teenage Daughters"	2011	Roman White
"One Time"	2011	—N/a
"I'm Gonna Love You Through It"	2011	Roman White
"Please Come Home for Christmas"	2012	—N/a
"If You Don't Know Me by Now"	2014	—N/a
"Come See About Me"	2014	Sean Hagwell
"Reckless"	2016	Jeff Venable
"Just Around the Corner"	2016	Matthew Underwood
"Girls Like Me"	2020	John Shearer

==== As guest artist ====
List of music videos, showing year released and director
Title	Year	Director
"On My Own" (Reba McEntire featuring Linda Davis, Martina McBride, and Trisha Yearwood)	1995	Dominic Orlando
"Valentine" (Jim Brickman with Martina McBride)	1997	Alan Glazen, Ron Goldfarb, Ted Zbozion
"Chances Are" (with Bob Seger)	1998	Nancy Bennett
"Back in the Saddle" (with Matraca Berg, Suzy Bogguss, Faith Hill, Patty Loveless and Trisha Yearwood)	1998	Steven Goldmann
"America the Beautiful" (as Various Artists)	2001	Marc Ball
"Trip Around the Sun" (Jimmy Buffett with Martina McBride)	2004	Trey Fanjoy
"Forever Country" (Artists of Then, Now & Forever)	2016	Joseph Kahn

== Other appearances ==
List of non-single guest appearances, with other performing artists, showing year released and album name
Title	Year	Other artist(s)	Album
"When Love Is Gone"	1992	The Muppets	The Muppet Christmas Carol
"On My Own" (also featuring Linda Davis and Trisha Yearwood)	1995	Reba McEntire	Starting Over
"O Holy Night"	1995	—N/a	Mother & Child: A Christmas Celebration of Motherhood
"How Great Thou Art"	1995	—N/a	Amazing Grace: A Salute to Country Gospel
"Back in the Saddle" (also featuring Suzy Bogguss, Faith Hill, Patty Loveless, and Trisha Yearwood)	1997	Matraca Berg	Sunday Morning to Saturday Night
"'Til I Can Make It on My Own"	1998	—N/a	A Tribute to Tradition
"Fool, I'm a Woman"	1998	Sara Evans	No Place That Far
"Little Bits of Lightning"	1998	—N/a	Touched by an Angel: The Album
"I Love You"	1999	—N/a	Runaway Bride (soundtrack)
"There You Are"	2000	—N/a	Where the Heart Is (soundtrack)
"You'll Get Through This"	2000	—N/a	The Mercy Project
"Georgia"	2001	Carolyn Dawn Johnson	Room with a View
"My Favorite Things"	2002	Keith Lockhart	My Favorite Things: A Richard Rogers Celebration
"I'll Be All Smiles Tonight"	2002	The Chieftains	Down the Old Plank Road: The Nashville Sessions
"Sweet Dreams (Of You)"	2003	Take 6	Remembering Patsy Cline
"Live This Life"	2004	Big & Rich	Horse of a Different Color
"God Bless America"	2004	—N/a	Patriotic Country
"Baby, It's Cold Outside"	2004	Dean Martin	Christmas with Dino
"Harper Valley PTA"	2005	—N/a	Music from and Inspired by Desperate Housewives
"I'll Be the Wind"	2005	Garth Brooks	The Lost Sessions
"Feels Like Home"	2006	Raul Malo	You're Only Lonely
"Through Your Eyes"	2006	—N/a	Bambi II (soundtrack)
"Unclouded Day"	2007	Brenda Lee	Gospel Duets with Treasured Friends
"Just One More"	2007	George Jones	George Jones & Friends: 50th Anniversary Tribute Concert
"Danny's Song"	2008	Anne Murray	Anne Murray Duets: Friends & Legends
"Never Loved Before"	2008	Alan Jackson	Good Time
"One Less Bell to Answer" (also featuring Rod Stewart, James Taylor, and Dionne Warwick)	2008	Steve Tyrell	Back to Bacharach
"What the World Needs Now" (also featuring Rod Stewart, James Taylor, and Dionne Warwick)	2008	Steve Tyrell	Back to Bacharach
"Blue Christmas"	2008	Elvis Presley	Christmas Duets
"Go Rest High on That Mountain"	2010	Vince Gill	The Country Music Hall of Fame and Museum Presents; Sunday In the Country
"Blessed"	2010	Lee Ann Womack	The Country Music Hall of Fame and Museum Presents; Sunday In the Country
"Louisiana Woman, Mississippi Man"	2010	Alan Jackson	Coal Miner's Daughter: A Tribute to Loretta Lynn
"We've Got Tonight"	2011	David Foster	Hit Man Returns: David Foster & Friends
"I'm Sorry"	2011	Blake Shelton	Red River Blue
"All Messed Up"	2011	Dave Stewart	The Blackbird Diaries
"Always on My Mind"	2013	Chris Mann	Chris Mann in Concert: A Mann for All Seasons
"Every Single Night"	2013	Dave Stewart	Lucky Numbers
"Have Yourself a Merry Little Christmas"	2013	Chris Mann	Home for Christmas: The Chris Mann Christmas Special
"An Affair to Remember"	2014	Ray Price	Beauty Is...The Final Sessions
"All My Friends"	2014	—N/a	All My Friends: Celebrating the Songs & Voice of Gregg Allman
"Can You Fool"	2014	Pat Monahan	All My Friends: Celebrating the Songs & Voice of Gregg Allman
"Jackson"	2014	George Strait	The Cowboy Rides Away: Live from AT&T Stadium
"What Child Is This"	2014	Michael W. Smith	The Spirit of Christmas
"That Old Flame"	2015	Don Henley	Cass County
