= The Waking Up Laughing Tour =

2007–08 concert tour by Martina McBride

Waking Up Laughing Tour
- Tour by Martina McBride
- Promotional poster for the tour
- Associated album: Waking Up Laughing
- Start date: April 12, 2007
- End date: October 18, 2008
- Legs: 3
- No. of shows: 120 in North America

Martina McBride concert chronology
- Timeless Tour (2005-06); Waking Up Laughing Tour (2007-08); Shine All Night Tour (2009-10)

The Waking Up Laughing Tour was the second headlining tour by American recording artist Martina McBride. Primarily visiting the United States and Canada, the tour supported her ninth studio album, Waking Up Laughing. The tour played over a hundred shows in 2007 and 2008, becoming one of the biggest tours by a country music artist—earning over eight million dollars and seen by over 250,000 spectators. Additionally, the tour placed 47th and 88th on Pollstar's Top 100 Tours in 2007 and 2008 respectively.

== Background ==
McBride performing on tour

The tour was announced through various media outlets on January 18, 2007, as McBride was promoting Anyway, the second single from her album. The tour marks the second time the singer has headlined a tour since her 2005 "Timeless Tour". Joining McBride on the road was Little Big Town and Rodney Atkins. Commenting on the tour, McBride stated:

As exciting as it is to create a new album, there's nothing quite as thrilling as getting the immediate feedback from a live crowd. I'm especially happy about being joined by Little Big Town and Rodney Atkins. We put a lot of thought into which artists to include on this tour, and I really feel like this show is going to be a treat for my fans from beginning to end. I can't wait to get out there on the road."

For the first time in the artist's career, McBride was joined on tour by her family. Her husband, John McBride was the sound engineer and her brothers Marty and Steve along with her three daughters. Although McBride competed against country music heavy hitters, Dolly Parton, Faith Hill and Tim McGraw, McBride's tour was named by Pollstar as the number one solo female country act for 2007. The success of the first leg lead to an expansion in 2008 with McBride playing arenas. This time around, McBride was joined by Lady Antebellum and Jack Ingram. The second leg saw McBride performing in Canada, her first performances since 2003. The tour received further accolades from Pollstar, becoming the 88th biggest tour in North America. The tour was expanded for a final time during the summer of 2008, with McBride playing amphitheaters and festivals in the United States. The tour ended at the Island Events Center (located at the Treasure Island Resort and Casino) in Red Wing, Minnesota with 120 performances.

=== Staging ===
The staging for McBride's tour was one of the most state of art for a country artist. The stage was created by Atomic Design, who created the stage for the singer's Timeless Tour. The stage featured the "Mitrix module". These were several video screens that mimicked louvers. Each screen as capable of "opening" and "closing" to reveal graphics and video content. The 12 video screens were positioned about a central screening, alluding the shape of a honeycomb. McBride was the very first artist to use this technology. When the screens were not in use, they became transparent allowing light to shine through. The stage contained a proscenium arch that extended to a lifts on each side of the stage.

== Opening acts ==
- Jack Ingram (North America—Leg 1-3) (select dates)
- Little Big Town (North America—Leg 1 and 3) (select dates)
- Rodney Atkins (North America—Leg 1) (select dates)
- Diamond Rio (North America—Leg 1) (select dates)
- Warren Brothers (North America—Leg 1) (select dates)
- Johnny Reid (Canada)
- Emerson Drive (Canada)
- Lady Antebellum (North America—Leg 2)
- Jason Michael Carroll (North America—Leg 3)
- Chris Young (North America—Leg 3)

== Setlist ==
2007

Premiere

1. "Anyway"
2. "When God-Fearin' Women Get the Blues"
3. "Wild Angels"
4. "My Baby Loves Me"
5. "Tryin' To Find A Reason" (duet with Marty Schiff)
6. "How I Feel"
7. "Happy Girl"
8. "(I Never Promised You A) Rose Garden"
9. "Thanks A Lot"
10. "I Can't Stop Loving You"
11. "Stand by Your Man"
12. "Concrete Angel"
13. "For These Times"
14. "I'll Still Be Me"
15. "Son of a Preacher Man"
16. "How Far"
17. "Where Would You Be"
18. "If I Had Your Name"
19. "This One's for the Girls"
20. "A Broken Wing"

Encore

21. "Independence Day"
22. "Bridge over Troubled Water"

Main set

1. "Anyway"
2. "When God-Fearin' Women Get the Blues"
3. "Wild Angels"
4. "Cry Cry ('Til The Sun Shines)"
5. "Tryin' To Find A Reason" (duet with Marty Schiff)
6. "My Baby Loves Me (Just the Way That I Am)"
7. "How I Feel"
8. "Happy Girl"
9. "(I Never Promised You A) Rose Garden"
10. "You Ain't Woman Enough (To Take My Man)"
11. "Help Me Make It Through the Night"
12. "If I Had Your Name"
13. "Where Would You Be"
14. "Concrete Angel"
15. Medley: "Love's the Only House" / "Blessed"
16. "This One's for the Girls"
17. "A Broken Wing"
18. "Independence Day"

Encore

19. "Don't Stop Believin'"
20. "Hit Me With Your Best Shot"
2008

Spring

1. "Anyway"
2. "When God-Fearin' Women Get the Blues"
3. "Happy Girl"
4. "(I Never Promised You A) Rose Garden"
5. "For These Times"
6. "Wild Angels"
7. "My Baby Loves Me (Just the Way That I Am)"
8. "Danny's Song"
9. "How I Feel"
10. "In My Daughter's Eyes"
11. "Heartaches by the Number"
12. "Help Me Make It Through the Night"
13. "Concrete Angel"
14. "Love's the Only House"
15. "Where Would You Be"
16. "This One's for the Girls"
17. "A Broken Wing"
18. "Independence Day"

Encore

19. "Don't Stop Believin'"
20. "Hit Me With Your Best Shot"

Summer

1. "It's My Time"
2. "When God-Fearin' Women Get the Blues"
3. "Happy Girl"
4. "Wild Angels"
5. "My Baby Loves Me (Just the Way That I Am)"
6. "Valentine"
7. "For These Times"
8. "Help Me Make It Through the Night"
9. "If I Had Your Name"
10. "Lean on Me"
11. "Summer of '69"
12. "Concrete Angel"
13. "Anyway"
14. "Love's the Only House"
15. "Where Would You Be"
16. "This One's for the Girls"
17. "A Broken Wing"
18. "Independence Day"

Encore

19. "Don't Stop Believin'"
20. "Hit Me With Your Best Shot"

=== Additional notes ===
2007 leg

- On occasion McBride would sing "Whatever You Say" instead of "Where Would You Be."
- The songs "I Love You", "Thanks A Lot", "I Can't Stop Loving You", "Heartaches By The Number", "How Far" and "I'll Still Be Me" had early appearances.
- "House of A Thousand Dreams", "Two More Bottles of Wine" "Over The Rainbow", "In My Daughter's Eyes", "Son of a Preacher Man", "Bridge Over Troubled Water" and "Stand By Your Man" at different shows.
- "For These Times" was played during the start of the tour but then was cut and did not return until late 2007 when the song was released as a single

2008 leg

- "Help Me Make It Through The Night" made an appearance early on in the second leg but it was soon replaced with "In My Daughter's Eyes."
- "Tryin' To Find A Reason" was cut from the set list shortly after the second leg of the tour began.
- Other songs played at various shows have been "Everybody Does", "I'll Still Be Me", "Today I Started Loving You Again", "Danny's Song", "I Love You", "Whatever You Say", "How I Feel" and "Safe in the Arms of Love"
- Following "Lean on Me", McBride also included "The Warrior" and "(You Make Me Feel Like) A Natural Woman" at select concerts. "Whatever You Say" was included in the first few set lists but was then replaced with "Valentine".
- In Raleigh, McBride debuted the song "Ride".
- At the final show in Red Wing, McBride performed "Wrong Again".

== Tour dates ==
Date	City	Country	Venue	Opening Acts
North America—Leg 1
April 12, 2007	Kansas City	United States	Kemper Arena	
April 13, 2007	Rosemont	United States	Rosemont Theatre	
April 15, 2007	Louisville	United States	Freedom Hall	
April 20, 2007	Uncasville	United States	Mohegan Sun Arena	
April 21, 2007	Lowell	United States	Tsongas Arena	
April 22, 2007	Albany	United States	Times Union Center	
April 27, 2007	Saginaw	United States	Dow Event Center	
April 28, 2007	Rochester	United States	Blue Cross Arena	
April 29, 2007	Toledo	United States	SeaGate Convention Centre	
May 4, 2007	Birmingham	United States	BJCC Arena	
May 5, 2007	Duluth	United States	Arena at Gwinnett Center	
May 6, 2007	Pensacola	United States	Pensacola Civic Center	
May 11, 2007	Pittsburgh	United States	Petersen Events Center	
May 12, 2007	Columbia	United States	Merriweather Post Pavilion	
May 18, 2007	New York City	United States	Radio City Music Hall	
May 25, 2007	Colorado Springs	United States	World Arena	
May 26, 2007	Loveland	United States	Budweiser Events Center	
May 27, 2007	Valley Center	United States	Britt Brown Arena	
May 31, 2007	Richmond	United States	Richmond Coliseum	
June 1, 2007	North Charleston	United States	North Charleston Coliseum	
June 2, 2007	Winston-Salem	United States	LJVM Coliseum	
June 3, 2007	Asheville	United States	Asheville Civic Center	
June 7, 2007	Cape Girardeau	United States	Show Me Center	
June 8, 2007	Jackson	United States	Mississippi Coliseum	
June 9, 2007^{[A]}	Nashville	United States	LP Field	
June 14, 2007^{[B]}	Sauk Centre	United States	Saukinac Campgrounds	Little Big Town
June 15, 2007	Sioux City	United States	Gateway Arena	
June 16, 2007^{[C]}	Burlington	United States	Miller Outdoor State	
June 17, 2007	Fairborn	United States	Nutter Center	
June 21, 2007	Cedar Falls	United States	McLeod Center	
June 22, 2007	Fort Wayne	United States	Allen County War Memorial Coliseum	
June 23, 2007	Erie	United States	Tullio Arena	
June 24, 2007	Springfield	United States	MassMutual Center	
June 28, 2007	Charleston	United States	Charleston Civic Center	
June 29, 2007	Wilkes-Barre	United States	Wachovia Arena	
June 30, 2007	Hershey	United States	Giant Center	
July 1, 2007	Manchester	United States	Verizon Wireless Arena	
July 12, 2007	Oklahoma City	United States	Ford Center	
July 13, 2007	Grand Prairie	United States	Nokia Theatre at Grand Prairie	
July 14, 2007	Austin	United States	Frank Erwin Center	
July 15, 2007	Bossier City	United States	CenturyTel Center	
July 19, 2007	Louisville	United States	Freedom Hall	
July 20, 2007^{[D]}	Twin Lakes	United States	Shadow Hill Ranch	
July 21, 2007	Hinckley	United States	Hinckley Amphitheater	
July 22, 2007	Grand Forks	United States	Alerus Center	
July 26, 2007	Glendale	United States	Jobing.com Arena	
July 27, 2007	Las Vegas	United States	Mandalay Bay Events Center	
July 28, 2007^{[E]}	Costa Mesa	United States	Pacific Amphitheatre	
July 29, 2007	Stateline	United States	Harvey's Outdoor Amphitheater	
July 31, 2007^{[F]}	Paso Robles	United States	Main Grandstand Arena	
August 1, 2007	Oakland	United States	Oracle Arena	
August 3, 2007	Portland	United States	Rose Garden	
August 4, 2007	Everett	United States	Comcast Arena	
August 5, 2007	Nampa	United States	Idaho Center	
August 7, 2007	Kennewick	United States	Toyota Center	
August 17, 2007^{[G]}	Springfield	United States	State Fair Grandstand	
September 7, 2007	Harris Township	United States	Island Showroom	
September 8, 2007	Harris Township	United States	Island Showroom	
September 20, 2007	Niagara Falls	Canada	Avalon Ballroom	
September 21, 2007	Niagara Falls	Canada	Avalon Ballroom	
September 29, 2007	Moline	United States	IWireless Center	
September 30, 2007	La Crosse	United States	La Crosse Center	
November 10, 2007	Washington, D.C.	United States	DAR Constitution Hall	
December 2, 2007	Friant	United States	TMC Indoor Event Center	
North America—Leg 2
January 18, 2008	Evansville	United States	Roberts Municipal Stadium	Jack Ingram; Lady Antebellum
January 19, 2008	Cincinnati	United States	U.S. Bank Arena	Jack Ingram; Lady Antebellum
January 20, 2008	Grand Rapids	United States	Van Andel Arena	Jack Ingram; Lady Antebellum
January 25, 2008	Ashwaubenon	United States	Resch Center	Jack Ingram; Lady Antebellum
January 26, 2008	Minneapolis	United States	Target Center	Jack Ingram; Lady Antebellum
January 27, 2008	Ames	United States	Hilton Coliseum	Jack Ingram; Lady Antebellum
February 1, 2008	Columbus	United States	Nationwide Arena	Jack Ingram; Lady Antebellum
February 2, 2008	Cleveland	United States	Wolstein Center	Jack Ingram; Lady Antebellum
February 22, 2008	Champaign	United States	Assembly Hall	Jack Ingram; Lady Antebellum
February 23, 2008	Council Bluffs	United States	Mid-America Center	Jack Ingram; Lady Antebellum
February 24, 2008	Columbia	United States	Hearnes Center	Jack Ingram; Lady Antebellum
February 29, 2008	Reading	United States	Sovereign Center	Jack Ingram; Lady Antebellum
March 1, 2008	Atlantic City	United States	Etess Arena	Jack Ingram; Lady Antebellum
March 2, 2008	Syracuse	United States	War Memorial	Jack Ingram; Lady Antebellum
March 17, 2008	Calgary	Canada	Pengrowth Saddledome	
March 19, 2008	Edmonton	Canada	Rexall Place	
March 20, 2008	Saskatoon	Canada	Credit Union Centre	
March 21, 2008	Winnipeg	Canada	MTS Centre	
March 28, 2008	Hamilton	Canada	Copps Coliseum	
March 29, 2008	Kanata	Canada	Scotiabank Place	
March 30, 2008	London	Canada	John Labatt Centre	
April 5, 2008	Hot Springs	United States	Summit Arena	
April 6, 2008	Columbia	United States	Mizzou Arena	
April 18, 2008	Estero	United States	Germain Arena	
April 19, 2008	Jacksonville	United States	Jacksonville Veterans Memorial Arena	
April 20, 2008	Huntsville	United States	Von Braun Center	
North America—Leg 3
July 11, 2008	Clarkston	United States	DTE Energy Music Theatre	Jack Ingram; Chris Young
July 12, 2008	Darien	United States	Darien Lake Performing Arts Center	Jack Ingram
July 13, 2008	Gilford	United States	Meadowbrook U.S. Cellular Pavilion	Jack Ingram; Chris Young
July 17, 2008	Selma	United States	Verizon Wireless Amphitheatre	
July 18, 2008	Dallas	United States	SuperPages.com Center	
July 19, 2008	The Woodlands	United States	Cynthia Woods Mitchell Pavilion	
July 24, 2008^{[H]}	Harrington	United States	Wilmington Trust Grandstand	Chris Young
July 25, 2008	Wantagh	United States	Nikon at Jones Beach Theater	
July 31, 2008	Missoula	United States	Dahlberg Arena	
August 1, 2008	West Valley City	United States	USANA Amphitheatre	
August 2, 2008	Greenwood Village	United States	Fiddler's Green Amphitheatre	
August 8, 2008	Concord	United States	Sleep Train Pavilion	
August 9, 2008	Wheatland	United States	Sleep Train Amphitheatre	
August 10, 2008	Kelseyville	United States	Konocti Field Amphitheatre	
August 12, 2008	Bakersfield	United States	Buck Owens' Crystal Palace	None
August 14, 2008	Albuquerque	United States	Journal Pavilion	Jack Ingram; Chris Young
August 15, 2008	Phoenix	United States	Cricket Wireless Pavilion	
August 16, 2008	Irvine	United States	Verizon Wireless Amphitheatre	
August 29, 2008	Maryland Heights	United States	Verizon Wireless Amphitheater	
August 30, 2008	Tinley Park	United States	First Midwest Bank Amphitheatre	
September 19, 2008	Hartford	United States	New England Dodge Music Center	Jack Ingram; Jason Michael Carroll
September 20, 2008	Camden	United States	Susquehanna Bank Center	
September 26, 2008	Burgettstown	United States	Post-Gazette Pavilion	
September 27, 2008	Bristow	United States	Nissan Pavilion	
October 3, 2008	Charlotte	United States	Verizon Wireless Amphitheatre	
October 4, 2008	Raleigh	United States	Time Warner Cable Music Pavilion	
October 5, 2008	Virginia Beach	United States	Verizon Wireless Amphitheatre	
October 10, 2008	Tampa	United States	Ford Amphitheatre	
October 11, 2008	West Palm Beach	United States	Cruzan Amphitheatre	
October 18, 2008	Red Wing	United States	Island Event Center	None

Festivals and other miscellaneous performances
^{A} This concert was a part of the CMA Music Festival
^{B} This concert was a part of the Country Music Fest USA
^{C} This concert was a part of the Burlington Steamboat Days
^{D} This concert was a part of the Country Thunder Music Festival
^{E} This concert was a part of the OC Fair Summer Concert Series
^{F} This concert was a part of the California Mid-State Fair
^{G} This concert was a part of the Illinois State Fair Concert Series
^{H} This concert was a part of the Delaware State Fair

Cancellations and rescheduled shows

August 28, 2008	Pelham, Alabama	Verizon Wireless Music Center	Cancelled due to flood damage

=== Box office score data ===
Venue	City	Tickets sold / available	Gross revenue
Mohegan Sun Arena	Uncasville	7,583 / 7,583 (100%)	$343,605
Dow Event Center	Saginaw	4,545 / 5,451 (83%)	$157,418
Blue Cross Arena	Rochester	6,570 / 9,785 (67%)	$280,454
SeaGate Convention Centre	Toledo	4,603 / 5,765 (80%)	$218,402
BJCC Arena	Birmingham	5,689 / 6,797 (84%)	$241,507
Arena at Gwinnett Center	Duluth	10,302 / 10,302 (100%)	$460,893
Pensacola Civic Center	Pensacola	5,251 / 7,309 (72%)	$225,505
Petersen Events Center	Pittsburgh	6,117 / 8,458 (72%)	$235,542
Merriweather Post Pavilion	Columbia	4,796 / 10,000 (48%)	$301,175
Radio City Music Hall	New York City	5,832 / 5,832 (100%)	$369,581
World Arena	Colorado Springs	5,691 / 6,127 (93%)	$265,647
Budweiser Events Center	Loveland	5,351 / 5,917 (90%)	$253,680
Britt Brown Arena	Valley Center	7,823 / 8,479 (92%)	$325,276
Richmond Coliseum	Richmond	5,803 / 7,485 (77%)	$206,242
North Charleston Coliseum	North Charleston	5,440 / 6,840 (79%)	$231,144
Mississippi Coliseum	Jackson	5,496 / 6,151 (89%)	$145,790
Gateway Arena	Sioux City	6,601 / 7,575 (87%)	$213,651
Nutter Center	Fairborn	5,886 / 7,636 (77%)	$215,930
Allen County War Memorial Coliseum	Fort Wayne	6,088 / 8,097 (75%)	$189,962
Ford Center	Oklahoma City	6,335 / 6,979 (91%)	$273,029
Nokia Theatre at Grand Prairie	Grand Prairie	3,915 / 4,353 (90%)	$245,553
Frank Erwin Center	Austin	4,996 / 6,794 (73%)	$201,287
CenturyTel Center	Bossier City	7,021 / 7,816 (90%)	$243,962
Freedom Hall	Louisville	5,101 / 5,101 (100%)	$232,295
Jobing.com Arena	Glendale	2,693 / 3,976 (68%)	$165,465
Mandalay Bay Events Center	Las Vegas	4,360 / 4,749 (92%)	$216,027
Harvey's Outdoor Amphitheater	Stateline	3,419 / 4,169 (82%)	$270,574
Main Grandstand Arena	Paso Robles	6,186 / 14,661 (42%)	$258,468
Comcast Arena	Everett	4,086 / 4,986 (82%)	$211,042
Van Andel Arena	Grand Rapids	5,576 / 5,869 (95%)	$194,896
Assembly Hall	Champaign	3,062 / 9,170 (33%)	$147,992
Sovereign Center	Reading	4,780 / 6,015 (79%)	$203,549
John Labatt Centre	London	7,410 / 8,017 (92%)	$420,219
Jacksonville Veterans Memorial Arena	Jacksonville	2,649 / 6,095 (43%)	$155,010
DTE Energy Music Theatre	Clarkston	7,652 / 15,214 (50%)	$178,933
Darien Lake Performing Arts Center	Darien	8,535 / 21,800 (39%)	$171,184
Verizon Wireless Amphitheatre	Selma	3,786 / 8,369 (45%)	$63,779
Verizon Wireless Amphitheatre	Irvine	5,375 / 15,938 (34%)	$137,456
TOTAL		212,404 / 301,660 (70%)	$8,872,124

== Broadcasts and recordings ==
While on tour, McBride was asked to do a concert special for PBS. McBride previously participated in the station's Soundstage series in 2005. The concert would be a part of the Great Performances series in 2007. Filmed on September 29 at the iWireless Center in Moline, Illinois, McBride performed her standard setlist, including a performance of "Over the Rainbow". Titled Martina McBride: Live in Concert, the special aired on PBS in March 2008 to correlate with the station's quarterly pledge drive. A CD/DVD package was released later in April 2008 including a CD with highlights of the concert along with a DVD of the full show. The album peaked at the #19 position on Billboard's Country Albums chart.

== Critical reception ==
Along with the tour's final success, the shows received further accolades from music critics. Timothy Finn (The Kansas City Star) was vowed by the premiere concert at Kemper Arena. He comments, "McBride has earned her fame and made her fortune singing slicked-up modern country, but she is a traditionalist at heart, and she showed it resoundingly during those numbers; 'Stand By Your Man' was especially spectacular. But most of the feminine mystique came courtesy of country queen Martina McBride, the Kansas-born beauty whose crystalline vocal chords have earned her the nickname 'the Celine Dion of the CMT set.'" Brian Dugger (The Blade) viewed the performance at the SeaGate Convention Centre as "girl power" recalling, "But the night was mostly about McBride, who won points with the crowd by pointing out that she hasn’t been to Toledo in a while and promised that it won’t be as long for her return trip. At one point, after an extended ovation, she got a little emotional and had to take a short break until the crowd quieted down."

For the concert at the BJCC Arena, Mary Colurso (The Birmingham News) felt McBride gave a crowd pleasing performance. He furthers writes, "Fans expected no less. The lovely singer radiates a wholesome, friendly charm that makes her seem safe and utterly approachable -- the superstar next door, we might say. McBride was at her best while singing two vintage covers: Loretta Lynn's 'You Ain't Woman Enough" and Kris Kristofferson's 'Help Me Make It Through the Night.'" Additional acclaim continue with the concert at the Radio City Music Hall. Mac Randall (Newsday) answered, "McBride's voice is honey-sweet and stunningly pure, and when she leaps into her upper register and milks a note for every possible ounce of emotion—as she did on "Where Would You Be" and "A Broken Wing"—it's guaranteed to get a crowd on its feet. There's more than a little Celine Dion in those big climactic sustained notes. Although McBride began her solo career in the early '90s as a country singer, newer songs such as "How I Feel", from her latest album Waking Up Laughing, have more in common with Benatar than Lynn."

It was McBride's range that won over Marie P. Grady (The Republican) during the concert at the MassMutual Center. She explains, "As McBride raised her right hand high in the air—conjuring her vocal chords to reach the sky on a song called 'Where Would You Be'—it was clear this entertainer had the vocal range to match her star billing. Van Rose (Times Leader) recalls McBride's voice being the highlight of the show at the Wachovia Arena. He continues, "Besides her amazing voice, one of the things that sets McBride apart from the rest of the country music singers is that she still possesses the enthusiasm of a newcomer. She put her heart and soul into every song and seemed to be genuinely having a good time. She also showed that she hasn’t lost her sense of humor. Before singing a duet with her younger brother on 'Trying to Find a Reason', a song off her new album in which she is joined by Keith Urban, she was able to make fun of herself. 'I feel kind of weird singing with my little brother' […] It's sort of an Angelina Jolie thing'."

As the tour began its second and final jaunt in 2008, McBride received more accolades for her concerts. Kate Darby (Evansville Courier & Press) thought highly of McBride for her concert at Roberts Municipal Stadium. She further comments, "The most striking thing about the performance was how different audience members reacted to her music. McBride is so natural that she seems to be addressing each person as an individual, which is a rare trait in a performer. Every person in the stadium was having an intensely personal experience while still feeding off of the energy of the people around them." Jack Leaver (The Grand Rapids Press) continues the vocal praise for McBride for her performance at the VanAndel Arena. He writes, "Throughout the evening, McBride gave a powerhouse vocal demonstration, her Titanic-sized voice belying her petite 5-foot-4 frame. She also exhibited a great sense of humor, such as when she introduced her cover of Kris Kristofferson's classic "Help Me Make It Through the Night", which is featured on McBride's 2005 platinum-selling album Timeless."

Gary Budzak (The Columbus Dispatch) found the performance at the Nationwide Arena to be nothing short of "moving". He states, "There were other moving songs. On 'In My Daughter's Eyes', pictures of McBride's three daughters filled the back of her stage, and many mothers and their daughters held each other as she sang. The video for 'Concrete Angel' was shown as McBride sang about a child who was beaten to death, and many an eye filled with tears. Other anthem-like songs included 'Independence Day' and 'Anyway'." For one of her first shows in Canada in years, Theresa Taylor (Jam!) gave McBride's show at the Pengrowth Saddledome three and a half out of five stars. She composed, "It was a diverse concert for fans who got their money's worth out of the three-act bill."

The same rating was shared by David Schmeichel (Jam!) for the singer's show at the MTS Centre. He explains, "Partly, the illusion could be chalked up to an abundance of female fans in the stands (and on the concourse, where the lines snaking out of the women's washrooms were at least three times as long as those for the merch tables)." Mario Tarradell (Guide Live) commended McBride's show at the SuperPages.com Center. He elucidates, "But Ms. McBride is always the consummate entertainer on the platform. She's comfortable, vibrant, personable and a vocalist to respect."

== Credits and Personnel ==
Crew

- Production Designer: Tom McPhillips
- Lighting Designer: Abigail Rosen Holmes
- Art Director: Conway Allison and Tracy Baskette-Fleaner
- Musical Director: Jim Medlin
- Stage Manager: Pat O'Neil
- Scenic Engineering & Soft Goods: Atomic Design, Inc.
- Scenic Fabrication: Setco
- Video: MooTV
- Lighting Vendor: Bandit Lights

Band

- Drums: Greg Herrington
- Keyboards: Jim Medlin
- Fiddle: Jenifer Wrinkle
- Guitar: Greg Foresman
- Acoustic guitar: Marty Schiff and Jenifer Wrinkle
- Bass guitar: Glenn Snow
- Steel guitar: Wayne Dahl
- Supporting vocals: Greg Foresman, Marty Schiff, Glenn Snow and Jenifer Wrinkle
