= Live in Concert (Martina McBride album) =

Live album / Video by Martina McBride
- Released: April 29, 2008
- Recorded: September 29, 2007
- Venue: iWireless Center, Moline, Illinois
- Genre: Country
- Label: RCA Nashville
- Producer: Martina McBride

Martina McBride chronology
Waking Up Laughing (2007)	Live in Concert (2008)	Playlist: The Very Best of Martina McBride (2008)

Live in Concert is the first live concert CD and DVD from country music superstar Martina McBride. The show was recorded September 29, 2007 at the iWireless Center in Moline, Illinois during McBride's Waking Up Laughing Tour. The concert was originally taped for a PBS Great Performances special that aired during the month of March 2008.

== Track listing ==
Disc 1 – Live CD

No.	Title	Writer(s)	Length
1.	"Happy Girl"	Beth Nielsen Chapman, Annie Roboff	3:33
2.	"Anyway"	Brad Warren, Brett Warren, Martina McBride	4:05
3.	"Concrete Angel"	Rob Crosby, Stephanie Bentley	4:18
4.	"From the Ashes"	Austin Cunningham, Hillary Lindsey	4:47
5.	"Whatever You Say"	Ed Hill, Tony Martin	5:58
6.	"This One's for the Girls"	Chris Lindsey, Hillary Lindsey, Aimee Mayo	4:11
7.	"Independence Day"	Gretchen Peters	3:36
8.	"Hit Me with Your Best Shot"	Eddie Schwartz	4:04

Disc 2 – Live DVD

No.	Title	Length
1.	"Anyway"
2.	"When God-Fearin' Women Get the Blues"
3.	"Wild Angels"
4.	"My Baby Loves Me"
5.	"Tryin' to Find a Reason"
6.	"How I Feel"
7.	"Happy Girl"
8.	"(I Never Promised You A) Rose Garden"
9.	"You Ain't Woman Enough"
10.	"Help Me Make It Through the Night"
11.	"Where Would You Be"
12.	"Concrete Angel"
13.	"For These Times"
14.	"Love's the Only House"/"Blessed"
15.	"This One's for the Girls"
16.	"A Broken Wing"
17.	"Independence Day"
18.	"Don't Stop Believin'"
19.	"Hit Me with Your Best Shot"
20.	"Over the Rainbow"

== Charts ==
=== Album ===
Year	Chart	Peak position
2008	U.S. Billboard 200	112
2008	U.S. Top Country Albums	19
