= Hits and More =

Greatest hits album by Martina McBride
- Released: January 16, 2012
- Recorded: 1993–2009
- Genre: Country
- Length: 77:18
- Label: RCA Nashville

Martina McBride chronology
Eleven (2011)	Hits and More (2012)	The Essential Martina McBride (2012)

Professional ratings
Review scores
Source	Rating
Allmusic	4/5 stars

Hits and More is the second greatest hits package released by American country music singer Martina McBride. The album was released on January 16, 2012, in the United Kingdom and January 17, 2012, in the United States; it was McBride's final release under her contract with RCA Records.

== Content ==
The album spans between 1993 and 2009, from her second album The Way That I Am to her tenth, Shine. It also includes three of the four new songs from her previous hits compilation, Greatest Hits, and unlike that album it includes songs from Martina, Waking Up Laughing and Shine.

The set also features two new songs, "Surrender" and "Straight to the Bone", as well as "Being Myself" which was previously only available on the limited edition On Target EP released at Target stores in 2004. With the exception of these three songs, all of the songs on the album are top-twenty hits on the Billboard Hot Country Songs chart, including four number ones, ten top-fives and two top-tens. The album debuted at 47 on the Billboard 200 and 11 on the Country album charts in the US while making number 1 on the UK Country Compilations Chart.

== Track listing ==
No.	Title	Writer(s)	Length
1.	"My Baby Loves Me"	Gretchen Peters	2:36
2.	"Independence Day"	Peters	3:26
3.	"Wild Angels"	Matraca Berg, Harry Stinson, Gary Harrison	3:46
4.	"A Broken Wing"	James House, Sam Hogin, Phil Barnhart	3:35
5.	"Valentine" (featuring Jim Brickman)	Jim Brickman, Jack Kugell	3:13
6.	"Happy Girl"	Beth Nielsen Chapman, Annie Roboff	3:28
7.	"Whatever You Say"	Ed Hill, Tony Martin	4:30
8.	"I Love You"	Keith Follesé, Adrienne Follesé, Tammy Hyler	2:53
9.	"Love's the Only House"	Buzz Cason, Tom Douglas	5:13
10.	"Blessed"	Brett James, Hillary Lindsey, Troy Verges	4:35
11.	"Where Would You Be"	Rick Ferrell, Rachel Proctor	4:33
12.	"Concrete Angel"	Rob Crosby, Stephanie Bentley	4:13
13.	"This One's for the Girls"	Chris Lindsey, Hillary Lindsey, Aimee Mayo	4:03
14.	"In My Daughter's Eyes"	James T. Slater	3:14
15.	"Anyway"	Martina McBride, Brad Warren, Brett Warren	4:44
16.	"Ride"	Michael Davey, Andrew Dorff, Chris A. Robbins	3:54
17.	"Wrong Baby Wrong Baby Wrong"	Stephen Barker Liles, Robert Ellis Orrall, Brad Warren, Brett Warren	3:41
18.	"Surrender"	James, Verges	3:44
19.	"Straight to the Bone"	Barnhart, Lindsey, Kevin Paige	4:17
20.	"Being Myself"	James, Lindsey, Verges	3:40
Total length:			77:18

== Personnel on tracks 18–20 ==
- Joe Chemay- bass guitar
- J.T. Corenflos- electric guitar
- Dan Dugmore- 12-string electric guitar, steel guitar
- John Hobbs- Hammond B-3 organ
- Dann Huff- electric guitar
- David Huff- drum programming
- B. James Lowry- acoustic guitar
- Martina McBride- lead vocals, background vocals
- The Nashville String Machine- strings
- Kevin Paige- background vocals
- Jimmie Lee Sloas- bass guitar
- Biff Watson- acoustic guitar
- Lonnie Wilson- drums
- Paul Worley- acoustic guitar

== Release history ==
Region	Date	Label	Format
United Kingdom	January 16, 2012	Sony Music	CD, digital download
United States	January 17, 2012	RCA Nashville	CD, digital download

== Chart performance ==
Chart (2012)	Peak position
UK Country Compilations Chart	1
US Billboard Top Country Albums	11
US Billboard 200	47
