= Martina McBride =

American country singer (born 1966)

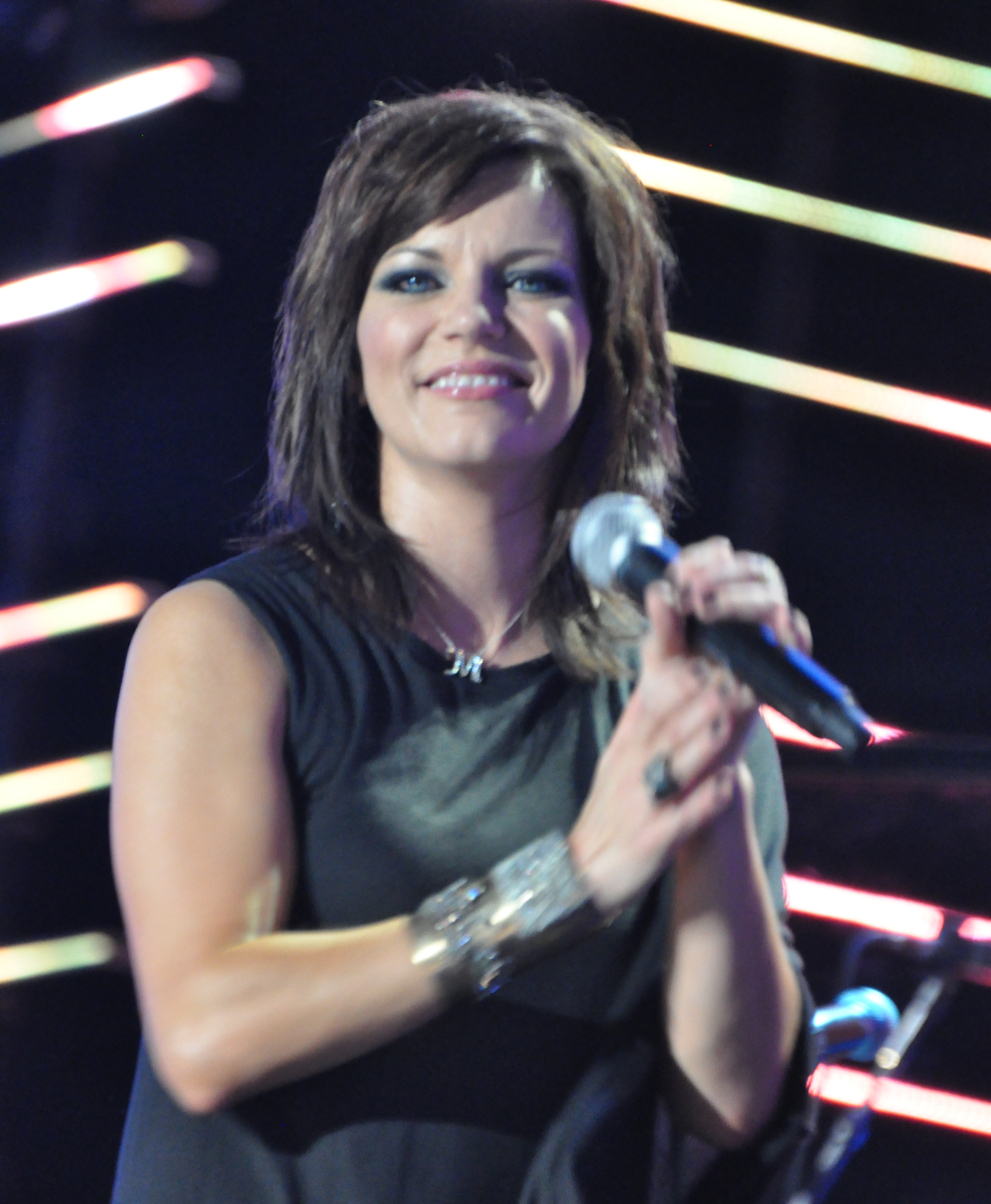
- McBride performing live in 2010

Background information
- Born: Martina Mariea Schiff; July 29, 1966 (age 60); Sharon, Kansas, U.S.
- Origin: Nashville, Tennessee, U.S.
- Genres: Country; country pop
- Occupations: Singer; songwriter
- Instruments: Vocals; piano; harmonica
- Years active: 1988–present
- Labels: RCA; Republic Nashville; Kobalt; NASH Icon; Broken Bow
- Spouse: John McBride (m. 1988)
- Website: martinamcbride.com

Martina Mariea McBride (née Schiff; born July 29, 1966) is an American country music singer and songwriter. An icon in the country music world, she is known for her country pop material with a powerful soprano voice and expansive range. McBride has won the Country Music Association Award for Female Vocalist of the Year award four times (tied with Reba McEntire for the third-most wins) and the Academy of Country Music's "Top Female Vocalist" award three times. She is also a 14-time Grammy Award nominee.

McBride was born in Sharon, Kansas, and relocated to Nashville, Tennessee, in 1989. She signed to RCA Records in 1991, and made her debut the following year as a neo-traditionalist country singer with the single, "The Time Has Come". Over time, she developed a pop-styled crossover sound, similar to Shania Twain and Faith Hill, and had a string of singles on the Billboard country chart and occasionally on the adult contemporary chart. Five of these singles went to No. 1 on the country chart between 1995 and 2001, and one peaked at No. 1 on the adult contemporary chart in 2003.

McBride has fourteen studio albums, two greatest hits compilations, one "live" album, as well as two additional compilation albums. Eight of her studio albums and two of her compilations have an RIAA Gold certification, or higher. In the U.S., she has sold over 14 million albums.

== Early life ==
Martina Mariea Schiff was born in Sharon, Kansas, on July 29, 1966. She has two brothers, Martin and Steve, who play in her concert band as of 2017, and a sister, Gina.

McBride's parents, Daryl and Jeanne Schiff, owned a dairy farm. Daryl, who was also a cabinetry shop owner, exposed her to country music at a young age. Listening to country music helped her acquire a love for singing. After school, she sang for hours along to the records of such popular artists as Reba McEntire, Linda Ronstadt, Juice Newton, Jeanne Pruett, Connie Smith, and Patsy Cline. Around the age of eight or nine, Martina began singing with a band her father fronted, "The Schiffters". As she grew older her role in the band progressively increased, from simply singing, to also playing keyboard with them. She enjoyed performing in her early years.

McBride began performing with a local rock band, The Penetrators, in Wichita instead. Then, in 1987, Schiff gathered a group of musicians called Lotus and started looking for rehearsal space; she began renting space from studio engineer John McBride. In 1988, the two married.

After marrying, the couple moved to Nashville, Tennessee, in 1989 with the hope of beginning a career in country music. John McBride joined Garth Brooks's sound crew and later became his concert production manager. Martina occasionally joined her husband on the road and helped sell Garth Brooks souvenirs. In 1990, impressed by her enthusiastic spirit, Brooks offered her the position of his opening act provided she could obtain a recording contract. During this time, while her husband was working with country artists Charlie Daniels and Ricky Van Shelton, he also helped produce her demo tape, which helped her gain a recording contract with RCA Nashville Records in 1991.

== Music career ==
=== 1992–1995: The Time Has Come and The Way That I Am ===
McBride released her debut studio album by RCA Records in 1992, titled The Time Has Come. It was produced by Paul Worley and Ed Seay. This album's title track made it to number 23 on the country music charts, while the next two singles both failed to make the Top 40. Unlike her later country pop-influenced albums, The Time Has Come featured honky tonk and country folk influences. McBride also contributed an arrangement of Paul Williams's original composition "When Love is Gone" to the soundtrack of the 1992 Brian Henson film The Muppet Christmas Carol.

The Way That I Am was McBride's second album. Its first two singles both brought her into the country top ten: "My Baby Loves Me", the album's de facto title song, peaked at number two, and "Life No. 9" peaked at number six. The former was previously a Top 10 hit in Canada for Patricia Conroy. However, it was the third single, "Independence Day", which was prevented from reaching the Top 10 through the oppositions of many radio programmers, who objected to the song's subject of a mother fighting back against abuse by burning the family home to the ground. "Independence Day" won Video of the Year and Song of the Year at the Country Music Association Awards, and has since become McBride's signature song. It also earned the song's composer, Gretchen Peters, a nomination for the Grammy Award for Best Country Song. The song also gave McBride a nomination for the Grammy Award for Best Female Country Vocal Performance. McBride performed the song at the 1995 Grammys ceremony. The fourth and fifth singles from The Way That I Am were less successful: "Heart Trouble" peaked at number 21, and "Where I Used to Have a Heart" fell short of the Top 40. McBride later criticized these single choices, saying that she felt "Strangers" would have been a better followup, as that song was more popular with fans and later appeared on her first greatest-hits album. The Way That I Am was certified platinum by the Recording Industry Association of America (RIAA).

"My Baby Loves Me (Just the Way That I Am)", as produced and released, proved to have a sing-along quality that led McBride to sing it that way in her subsequent concerts.

=== 1995–1999: Wild Angels and Evolution ===
McBride's third album, Wild Angels, was released in 1995. It accounted for another Top 5 hit in its lead single "Safe in the Arms of Love", which had previously been recorded by both Wild Choir and Baillie & the Boys, and was concurrently released in Canada by Michelle Wright at the time of McBride's version. The album's title track went on to become McBride's first No. 1 single on the country charts in early 1996. The album's third, fourth, and fifth singles, "Phones Are Ringin' All Over Town", "Swingin' Doors", and "Cry on the Shoulder of the Road" were less successful, having reached the lower regions of the Top 40.

In early 1997, after "Cry on the Shoulder of the Road" peaked, McBride released two duets. "Still Holding On", a duet with Clint Black which was the lead-off single to her fourth album Evolution and Black's album Nothin' but the Taillights, and "Valentine", a collaboration with pop pianist Jim Brickman which appeared on his album Picture This. She also sang duet vocals on "Chances Are" with Bob Seger, featured on the soundtrack of the 1998 motion picture Hope Floats.

She had her second number one on the country charts with "A Broken Wing", the second single from her Evolution album, in late 1997. Evolution went on to produce four more Top 10 hits at country radio: a re-release of "Valentine", "Happy Girl", "Wrong Again" (which also went to number one), and "Whatever You Say". Towards the end of 1998, the album was certified double platinum in sales by the Recording Industry Association of America for selling two million units. In addition, she also won the Country Music Association Awards' "Female Vocalist of the Year" award in 1999

Also in 1998, McBride released her first Christmas album titled White Christmas, which featured a rendition of "O Holy Night" that first charted in 1997 and continued to re-enter the charts until 2001. She also sang a guest vocal on Jason Sellers' mid-1998 single "This Small Divide".

=== 1999–2002: Emotion and Greatest Hits ===
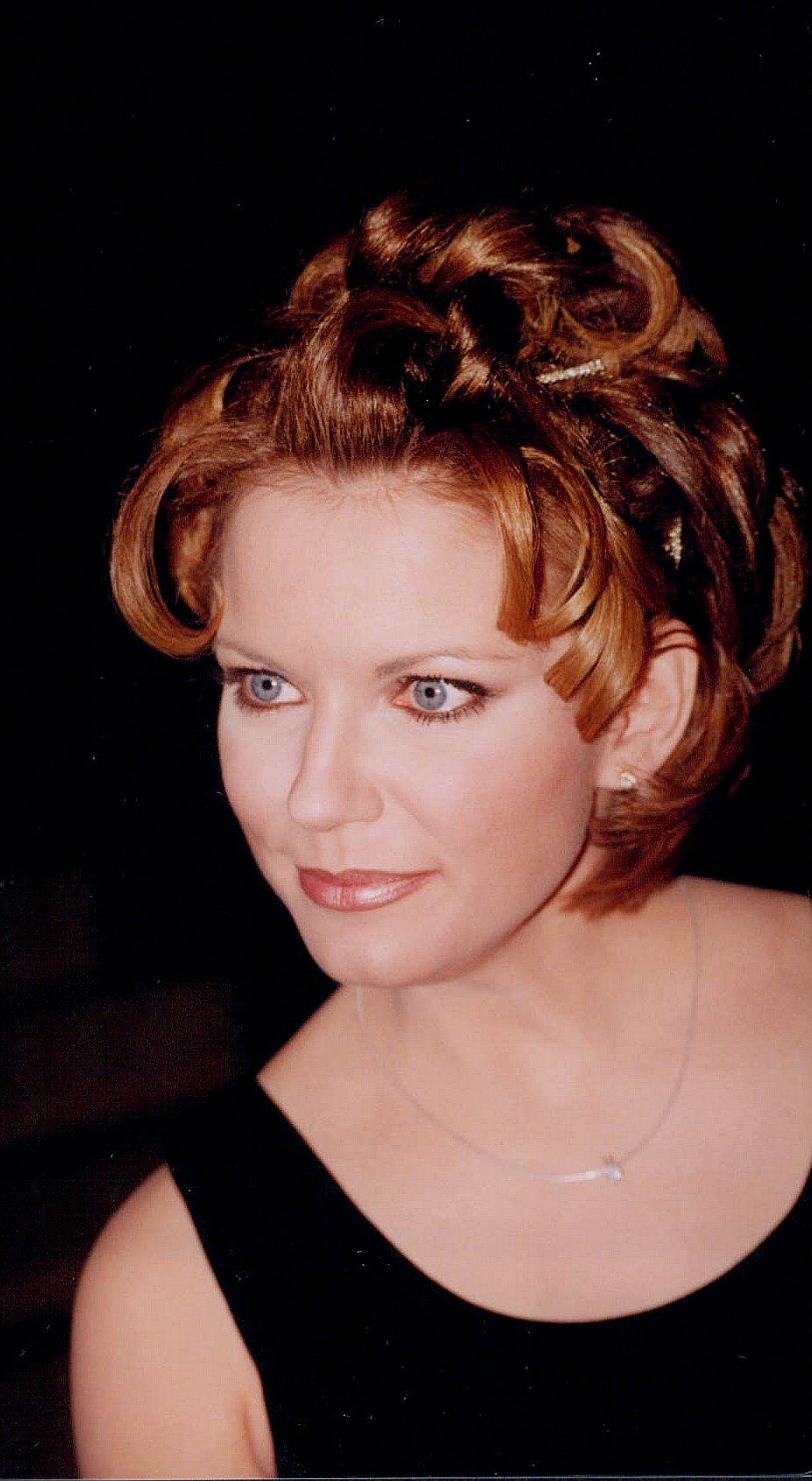
McBride at Ford's Theater in 1998

McBride's sixth studio album, Emotion, was released in 1999. Its lead single, "I Love You", reached number one on the Billboard country charts in 1999, and also crossed over to the Adult Contemporary chart. The song's follow-ups, "Love's the Only House" and "There You Are", both made the Top 5 at country radio, and "It's My Time" peaked at number 11.

In 2001, she released her first compilation, Greatest Hits. This album has been certified 3× Platinum in sales by the Recording Industry Association of America, and is her highest-selling album. It included most of her major hits to that point, and the album track "Strangers" from the album The Way That I Am, which she put on the album because she felt that it should have been a single. The album also included four new songs, all of which were Top 10 hit on the country music charts between 2001 and 2003: "When God-Fearin' Women Get the Blues" (at number 8), "Blessed" (at number 1), "Where Would You Be" (at number 3), and "Concrete Angel" (at number 5). Carolyn Dawn Johnson sang backing vocals on "Blessed"; conversely, McBride sang backing vocals on Johnson's late-2000 debut single, titled "Georgia". Late in 2002, McBride also sang backing vocals on Andy Griggs's single "Practice Life".

=== 2003–04: Martina ===
In 2003, McBride released her seventh studio album, Martina, which celebrated womanhood. The first single, "This One's for the Girls", went to number 3 on the country charts and became her only number-one hit on the Adult Contemporary charts. It also included backing vocals from Faith Hill, Carolyn Dawn Johnson, and McBride's daughters, Delaney and Emma. Follow-up single "In My Daughter's Eyes" was also a Top 5 hit at both country and adult contemporary. "How Far" and "God's Will" both made the Top 20 at country radio, as did her guest appearance on Jimmy Buffett's single "Trip Around the Sun", whose chart run overlapped that of "God's Will".

In 2004, McBride won the CMA's Female Vocalist award for the fourth time, following the wins in 2003, 2002 and 1999, which tied her for the most wins in that category with Reba McEntire.

=== 2005–2008: Timeless and Waking Up Laughing ===
After finding success in country pop-styled music, McBride released her next studio album, Timeless, in 2005, which consisted of country covers. The album included cover versions of country music standards, such as Hank Williams' "You Win Again", Loretta Lynn's "You Ain't Woman Enough", and Kris Kristofferson's "Help Me Make It Through the Night". To make the album sound in its authentic style, McBride and her husband hired veteran Nashville session players and primarily incorporated vintage analog recording equipment. The album sold over 250,000 copies within its first week, the highest sales start for a McBride album. The lead single, a cover of Lynn Anderson's "(I Never Promised You a) Rose Garden", went to number 18 on the country charts, but the other two singles both failed to make top 40.

In 2006, McBride served as a guest coach on Canadian Idol. The remaining five finalists traveled to Nashville, where McBride worked with the competitors on the songs they had chosen by country artists such as Gordon Lightfoot and Patsy Cline. Among the other guest judges that year were Nelly Furtado and Cyndi Lauper. McBride later joined Canadian Idol on a tour in the Spring. In 2007, McBride also served as a guest coach on Fox Networks television series, American Idol.

In 2007, McBride released her ninth studio album, Waking Up Laughing. It was the first album in which McBride co-wrote some of the tracks. She set up her Waking Up Laughing Tour in 2007, which included country artists Rodney Atkins, Little Big Town, and Jason Michael Carroll. The album's lead single, "Anyway", went to No. 5 on the Billboard Country Chart, becoming her first Top 10 hit since 2003. She also lent her voice singing "Anyway" in a Lifetime movie called, "A Life Interrupted" which premiered on April 23, 2007. Its follow-up, "How I Feel", reached the Top 15. In Spring 2008, McBride released Martina McBride: Live In Concert, a CD/DVD set. It was taped in Moline, Illinois in September 2007.

In July 2007, The ABC Television Network announced a special program called Six Degrees of Martina McBride where individuals from around the country were challenged to find their way to McBride on their own connections and research using a maximum of six methods. The "winner" of this challenge eventually located a direct connection to McBride through her husband, John, who knew someone, who knew someone else. McBride recorded an electronically produced duet with Elvis Presley, performing his song "Blue Christmas" as a duet with him on his latest compilation, The Elvis Presley Christmas Duets. A compilation collection, titled Playlist: The Very Best of Martina McBride, was released on December 16, 2008, as part of Sony BMG Playlist series. The album features 11 previously released tracks and three unreleased tracks.

=== 2008–2010: Shine ===
McBride wrapped up production of her tenth studio album in late 2008. The first single, "Ride", was released to radio in October 2008 and debuted at No. No. 43 on the Hot Country Songs chart. It barely missed the Top 10 on the chart, peaking at number eleven in March 2009. A music video produced by Kristin Barlowe was also released at the end of the year. The album, Shine, was released by RCA Records on March 24, 2009, and debuted at the top of the U.S. Country album chart and number 10 on the Billboard 200. McBride co-produced the album with Dann Huff, and it featured "Sunny Side Up", a song that she co-wrote. The second single, "I Just Call You Mine", was released in May 2009 and reached the Top 20. The third single from Shine was "Wrong Baby Wrong Baby Wrong", which the Warren Brothers co-wrote with Robert Ellis Orrall and Love and Theft member Stephen Barker Liles.

McBride also initiated the Shine All Night Tour, a co-headlining venture with fellow country star and friend Trace Adkins and opening act Sarah Buxton. The tour began in November 2009 and ended in May 2010.

On June 10, 2010, Billboard announced that McBride had collaborated on a song with Kid Rock. In late June 2010, McBride was nominated for a Teen Choice Award, "Favorite Country Female Artist", alongside country stars Carrie Underwood, Miranda Lambert, Taylor Swift and Gretchen Wilson.

In late 2010, McBride was nominated for two American Country Awards (Best Female Single & Touring Artist of the year w/ Trace Adkins.) Along with the ACA nominations, she received her 14th Female Vocalist nomination for Country Music Association in October.

=== 2010–2016: Eleven and Everlasting ===
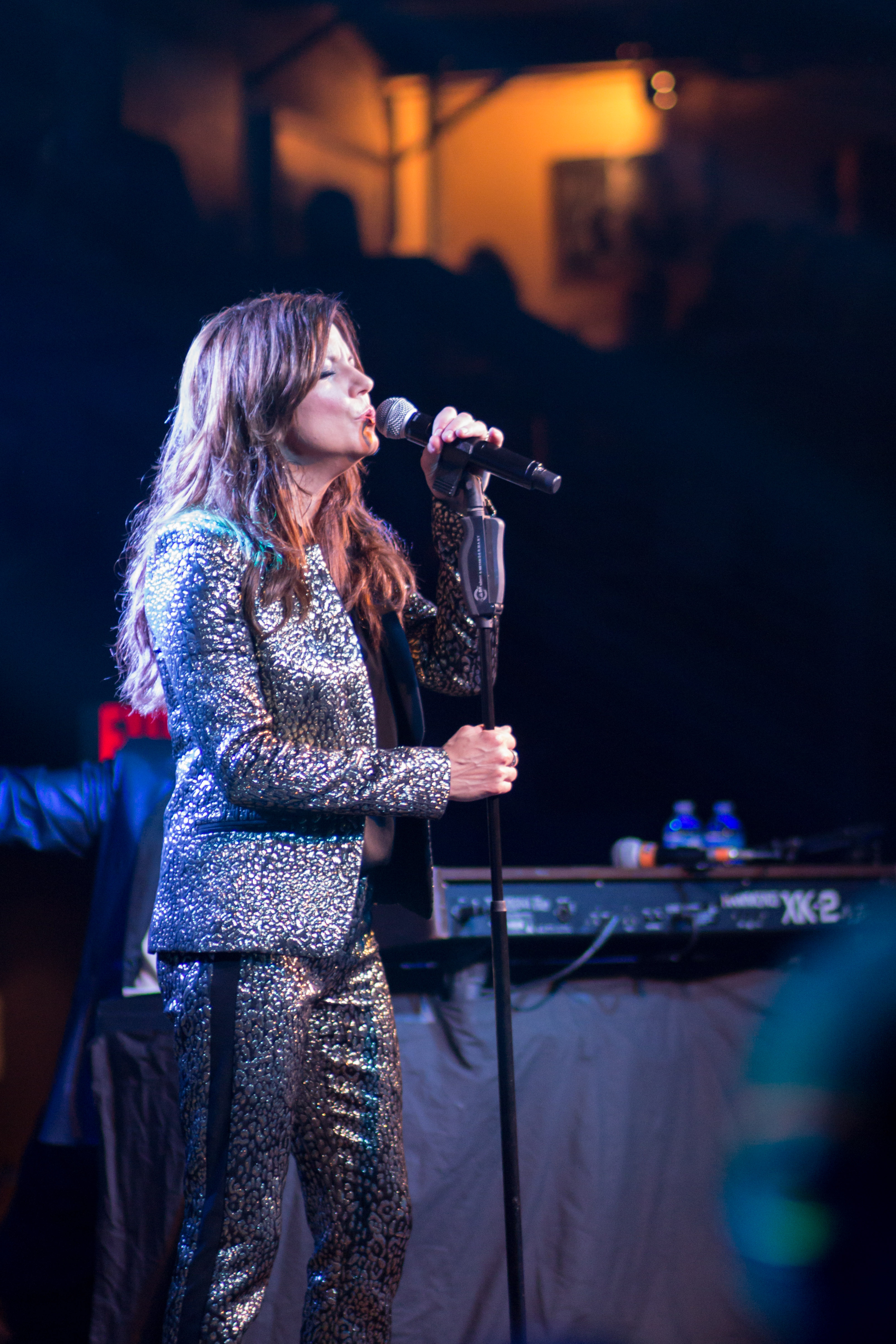
McBride performing in Nashville in 2014.

McBride exited RCA in November 2010 and signed with Republic Nashville. She began working on a new studio album with producer Byron Gallimore. Her first single for Republic Nashville is "Teenage Daughters", which she also co-wrote with the Warren Brothers. McBride told Country Weekly that she co-wrote eight of the eleven songs on the album; she decided to write more frequently because she felt more confident in her songwriting ability after "Anyway" had become a hit. An album track, "One Night" was released as a promotion for NASCAR with a music video in June 2011.

"I'm Gonna Love You Through It" was released as the album's second single on July 25, 2011. The song became a critical and commercial hit, peaking at number 4 and becoming her first top five hit since 2006's "Anyway". The album, titled Eleven, was released on October 11, 2011. Its third single was a cover of Train's "Marry Me", recorded as a duet with Train lead singer Pat Monahan. In September 2011, McBride was nominated for the CMA's Female Vocalist award for the 15th time, and 14th time consecutively.

RCA Records released two compilation albums in 2012, Hits and More in January and The Essential Martina McBride in October.

McBride released Everlasting, a collection of R&B and Soul covers, on April 8, 2014, via Kobalt Label Services. The album includes duets with Kelly Clarkson and Gavin DeGraw, and was produced by Don Was.

In September 2014, McBride received her 17th Female Vocalist nomination from the Country Music Association. She was tied with Reba McEntire for most nominations in any vocalist category, until McEntire's 18th nomination in 2017.

=== 2016–present: Reckless and Vocal Point podcast ===
In 2016, McBride released a new single called "Reckless", the title track for a new album. Reckless was released on April 29 through Nash Icon Records. It was recorded at Blackbird Studios and produced by Nathan Chapman and Dann Huff. The album includes 10 songs, one of which is the previously released single "Reckless". According to McBride, making this album felt like "coming home". Reckless debuted at number 2 on the Billboard Top Country Albums Chart.

On June 8, 2016, McBride debuted the video for her second single, "Just Around The Corner", during the CMT Music Awards. This song is the official Band Against Cancer anthem. Band Against Cancer is a community-based movement led by Sarah Cannon (the cancer institute of HCA) in partnership with Big Machine Label Group and McBride, which aims to raise awareness, support and resources to those diagnosed with cancer. The initiative includes a series of concerts across United States, with McBride as a headliner.

In August 2016, the singer announced a new tour called "Love Unleashed". According to McBride, the purpose of the tour was to unite people and spread love through the power of music as a response to the "tragedy and uncertainty in the world". She was also selected as one of 30 artists to perform on "Forever Country", a mash-up track of Take Me Home, Country Roads; On the Road Again; and I Will Always Love You which celebrated 50 years of the CMA Awards.

In July 2017, McBride revealed she is planning on releasing a Christmas album, of which she said " It won't have as many hymns on it. It will be more things like 'Santa Claus Is Comin' To Town' and 'It's Beginning To Look A Lot Like Christmas.'" She later announced that it would be released in 2018, "One is a new Christmas album, which will come out in 2018." The Christmas album It's the Holiday Season was released on October 19, 2018. Its release would accompany a Christmas tour, called "Joy of Christmas" as well as a cookbook called "Martina's Kitchen Mix: My Recipe Playlist for Real Life" released on October 30, 2018. This was McBride's second cookbook, following her 2014 release called "Around the Table: Recipes and Inspiration for Gatherings Throughout the Year". McBride also launched a show on Food Network, airing on Sundays at 11am eastern.

In 2019, McBride began the podcast Vocal Point, a "free-wheeling, wide-ranging" topical conversation series.

On May 4, 2020, McBride appeared in the second-season episode of NBC's Songland and released the song "Girls Like Me".

In March 2022, McBride sold her Master Royalty Rights to Primary Wave. The company also took ownership and distribution rights for her Everlasting album and the singer's It's the Holiday Season Christmas album. McBride was announced as the opening act for The Judds Final Tour, scheduled to begin in summer 2022. However, Naomi Judd died before the tour could begin. Her daughter, Wynonna, announced at her memorial that she and McBride would honor the tour dates as a tribute to Naomi.

== Personal life ==
In 1988, Martina Schiff, as she was known up to that time, married sound engineer John McBride, taking his family name as her stage name. The couple have three daughters: Delaney Katharine (born December 22, 1994), Emma Justine (born March 29, 1998), and Ava Rose Kathleen (born June 20, 2005). After becoming a mother, the singer reduced her touring schedule only to holidays and summers so that her daughters could have a normal upbringing. Joe Galante said this was "an enormous choice in terms of money", but McBride had made it very clear that she wanted to be present in her daughters' lives.

== Charity work ==
McBride works with a variety of charities. She has served as a spokeswoman for the National Domestic Violence Hotline as well as for the National Network to End Domestic Violence and national spokeswoman for the Tulsa Domestic Violence and Intervention Services. Every year since 1995, she has hosted Middle Tennessee's YWCA, "Celebrity Auction", and it has raised nearly $400,000 so far. McBride was awarded the "Minnie Pearl Humanitarian Award" in 2003. In 2004, she worked with "Kids Wish Network" to fulfill the wish of a young girl dying from muscular dystrophy.

McBride explained that educating girls and women on domestic violence is something she works on at home with her own daughters, stating:

A lot of teenage girls will be first dating and they'll think, 'Oh he doesn't want me to see my friends. He just wants me all to himself. Isn't that sweet?' Or 'Oh, he's just being protective. Isn't that sweet?' And then it turns into something else and it's controlling. They don't recognize that until it's too late. So it's an ongoing education that you have to give young girls, I think.

McBride has also teamed up with Loveisrespect, National Teen Dating Abuse Helpline, working with them on a new program called, "My Time to Shine".

McBride appeared on the Stand Up 2 Cancer Telethon in September 2010, where she performed "Unchained Melody" with Leona Lewis, Aaron Neville, and Stevie Wonder. Also in 2010, she hosted the YWCA for the 16th consecutive year, raising over $50,000. It totals over $500,000 raised so far.

McBride also has a charity initiative called "Team Music is Love". Speaking about Team Music Is Love, McBride stated "It started a few years ago as a group of fans that asked me if they could wear a T-shirt with my name to walk in a breast cancer walk, and I said 'of course' and it has grown from there. Last year, we decided we wanted to give it a better name, a name that sounded as important as it is, so we changed it to 'Team Music is Love,' since it's about spreading love through music. We have done some amazing things over the past few years and we continue to grow and keep giving back."

== Discography ==
- 1992: The Time Has Come
- 1993: The Way That I Am
- 1995: Wild Angels
- 1997: Evolution
- 1998: White Christmas
- 1999: Emotion
- 2003: Martina
- 2005: Timeless
- 2007: Waking Up Laughing
- 2009: Shine
- 2011: Eleven
- 2014: Everlasting
- 2016: Reckless
- 2018: It's the Holiday Season

== Tours ==
Headlining

- Evolution Tour (1997-98)
- Emotions Tour (1999-2000)
- Greatest Hits Tour (2002–03)
- Timeless Tour (2006)
- Waking Up Laughing Tour (2007–08)
- One Night Tour (2011–12)
- Everlasting Tour (2014–15)
- Love Unleashed Tour (2016–17)

Co-headlining

- Virginia Slims on the Legends (with Regina Belle, Gladys Knight and Barbara Mandrell) (1995)
- Lilith Fair (with Sarah McLachlan, et al.) (1998-99)
- Girls Night Out (with Sara Evans, Carolyn Dawn Johnson, Jamie O'Neal and Reba McEntire) (2001)
- Alan Jackson and Martina McBride in Concert (with Alan Jackson) (2004)
- Shine All Night Tour (with Trace Adkins) (2009-10)

Holiday concert

- Joy of Christmas Tour (2002, 2004, 2005, 2006, 2008, 2012, 2013, 2017, 2018)

Opening act

- World Tour '93-'94 (for Garth Brooks) (1993-94)
- Walkin on Sundown Tour (for Brooks & Dunn) (1994)
- Easy Come Easy Go Tour (for George Strait) (1994)
- Everywhere Tour (for Tim McGraw) (1997)
- The Cowboy Rides Away Tour (for George Strait) (2012-13)
- The Final Tour (for Wynonna Judd) (2022-23)

== Awards and nominations ==
McBride has received a number of awards, including the Country Music Association Award (CMA) for Female Vocalist of the Year, with her fourth win in 2004. In 2011 she received an honorary CMA award. She has been nominated for 14 Grammy Awards, but has never won.

=== Grammy Awards ===
Year	Category	Work	Result
1995	Best Female Country Vocal Performance	"Independence Day"	Nominated
1996	Best Female Country Vocal Performance	"Safe in the Arms of Love"	Nominated
1996	Best Country Collaboration with Vocals	"On My Own" (with Linda Davis, Reba McEntire and Trisha Yearwood)	Nominated
1998	Best Country Collaboration with Vocals	"Still Holding On" (with Clint Black)	Nominated
2000	Best Female Country Vocal Performance	"I Love You"	Nominated
2003	Best Female Country Vocal Performance	"Blessed"	Nominated
2004	Best Female Country Vocal Performance	"This One's for the Girls"	Nominated
2004	Best Short Form Music Video	"Concrete Angel"	Nominated
2005	Best Female Country Vocal Performance	"In My Daughter's Eyes"	Nominated
2006	Best Short Form Music Video	"God's Will"	Nominated
2007	Best Female Country Vocal Performance	"I Still Miss Someone"	Nominated
2009	Best Female Country Vocal Performance	"For These Times"	Nominated
2010	Best Female Country Vocal Performance	I Just Call You Mine	Nominated
2012	Best Country Solo Performance	"I'm Gonna Love You Through It"	Nominated

Note: In 1995, McBride was one of the various artists featured on the album Amazing Grace – A Country Salute to Gospel (singing "How Great Thou Art"), which won the Grammy Award for Best Southern, Country or Bluegrass Gospel Album. This award went to the compilation album's producer Bill Hearn, and not to the artists.

=== Other awards ===
Year	Association	Category	Work	Result
1993	Academy of Country Music	New Female Vocalist of the Year		Nominated
1994	Country Music Association	Horizon Award		Nominated
1994	Country Music Association	Music Video of the Year	"Independence Day"	Won
1996	TNN/Music City News	Music Video of the Year	"Independence Day"	Won
1996	Country Music Association	Female Vocalist of the Year		Nominated
1997	Academy of Country Music	Music Video of the Year	"A Broken Wing"	Nominated
1997	Academy of Country Music	Top Female Vocalist		Nominated
1998	Country Music Association	Female Vocalist of the Year		Nominated
1998	Country Music Association	Single of the Year	"A Broken Wing"	Nominated
1998	Academy of Country Music	Top Female Vocalist		Nominated
1999	American Music Awards	Favorite Female Country Artist		Nominated
1999	Country Music Association	Founding President's Award		Won
1999	Country Music Association	Female Vocalist of the Year		Won
1999	Academy of Country Music	Top Female Vocalist		Nominated
2000	American Music Awards	Favorite Country Female Artist		Nominated
2000	Academy of Country Music	Top Female Vocalist		Nominated
2000	Country Music Association	Female Vocalist of the Year		Nominated
2001	Flameworthy Awards	Female Video of the Year	"Blessed"	Won
2001	Academy of Country Music Awards	Top Female Vocalist		Won
2001	Country Music Association	Female Vocalist of the Year		Nominated
2002	Academy of Country Music Awards	Top Female Vocalist		Won
2002	Country Music Association	Female Vocalist of the Year		Won
2002	Country Music Association	Single of the Year	"Blessed"	Nominated
2002	Billboard Music Awards	Country Female Artist of the Year		Nominated
2003	Academy of Country Music	Album of the Year	Martina	Nominated
2003	Academy of Country Music	Humanitarian of the Year		Won
2003	Academy of Country Music	Top Female Vocalist		Won
2003	Flameworthy Awards	Female Video of the Year	"Concrete Angel"	Won
2003	Country Music Association Awards	Female Vocalist of the Year		Won
2003	American Music Awards	Favorite Country Female Artist		Won
2004	Country Music Association	Female Vocalist of the Year		Won
2004	Academy of Country Music	Top Female Vocalist		Nominated
2004	Billboard Music Awards	Female Country Artist of the Year		Nominated
2004	American Music Awards	Favorite Country Female Artist		Nominated
2005	CMT Video Awards	Most Inspiring Video	"Gods Will	Nominated
2005	CMT Video Awards	Female Video	"Gods Will	Nominated
2005	Academy of Country Music	Top Female Vocalist		Nominated
2005	American Music Awards	Favorite Country Female Artist		Nominated
2006	Academy of Country Music	Top Female Vocalist		Nominated
2007	American Music Awards	Favorite Country Female Artist		Nominated
2007	Academy of Country Music	Top Female Vocalist		Nominated
2007	Country Music Association	Female Vocalist of the Year		Nominated
2007	Country Music Association	Music Video of the Year	"Anyway"	Nominated
2007	Country Music Association	Single of the Year	"Anyway"	Nominated
2007	Country Music Association	Song of the Year	"Anyway"	Nominated
2007	BMI	Song of the Year	"Anyway"	Nominated
2007	BMI	Most Played Song of the Year	"Anyway"	Won
2007	Billboard Music Awards	Top Country Grossing Tour of the Year		Won
2007	ASCAP	Female Song of the Year	"Anyway"	Won
2007	ASCAP	Song of the Year	"Anyway"	Won
2008	CMT Video Awards	Female Video	"Anyway"	Nominated
2008	Academy of Country Music	Top Female Vocalist		Nominated
2008	Country Music Association	Female Vocalist of the Year		Nominated
2009	Country Music Association	Female Vocalist		Nominated
2009	CMT Video Awards	Female Video	"Ride"	Nominated
2010	Teen Choice Awards	Choice Female Country Artist		Nominated
2010	CMT Video Awards	Female Video	"I Just Call You Mine"	Nominated
2010	American Country Awards	Single by A Female Artist	"Wrong Baby Wrong"	Nominated
2010	American Country Awards	Touring Artist of the Year		Nominated
2010	Country Music Association	Female Vocalist		Nominated
2011	Academy of Country Music	Honorary Award		Won
2011	Country Music Association	Female Vocalist		Nominated
2012	Country Music Association	Female Vocalist of the Year		Nominated
2012	American Country Awards	Female Artist of the Year		Nominated
2012	American Country Awards	Single by a Female Artist	"I'm Gonna Love You Through It"	Nominated
2012	American Country Awards	Music Video by a Female Artist	"I'm Gonna Love You Through It"	Nominated
2012	Academy of Country Music	Female Vocalist of the Year		Nominated
2013	Academy of Country Music	Female Vocalist of the Year		Nominated
2013	Country Music Association	Female Vocalist of the Year		Nominated
2014	Academy of Country Music	Female Vocalist of the Year		Nominated
2014	Country Music Association	Female Vocalist of the Year		Nominated
2015	Academy of Country Music	Female Vocalist of the Year		Nominated
2019	Academy of Country Music	Icon Award		Won
