= Everlasting (Martina McBride album) =

Studio album by Martina McBride
- Released: April 8, 2014
- Recorded: 2013
- Studio: Blackbird (Nashville, Tennessee); The Loft (Detroit, Michigan)
- Genre: Soul; pop; country
- Length: 39:02
- Label: Vinyl Recordings
- Producer: Don Was

Martina McBride chronology
The Essential Martina McBride (2012)	Everlasting (2014)	Reckless (2016)

Everlasting is the twelfth studio album by American country music artist Martina McBride. It was released on April 8, 2014, on McBride's own label through Kobalt Label Services. The album features covers of soul and R&B songs. It was produced by Don Was and includes duets with Gavin DeGraw and Kelly Clarkson.

== Critical reception ==
Professional ratings
Review scores
Source	Rating
AllMusic	3.5/5 stars
Country Weekly	A−
The Oakland Press	3/4 stars
USA Today	3/4 stars

Everlasting garnered generally positive reception from five music critics. At The Oakland Press, Gary Graff rated the album three stars out of four, saying how the release "is a welcome and successful exercise in creative stretching." Stephen Thomas Erlewine rated the album three-and-a-half stars out of five, remarking how "There's warmth in Was' production and honey in McBride's voice and if the combination can sometimes result in too-sweet tea, it's nevertheless soothing." At USA Today, Jerry Shriver rated the album three stars out of four, indicating how "Covering classic soul tunes is an overdone concept, but this well chosen collection shines". Jon Freeman of Country Weekly graded the album an A−, writing that "Overall the recording sounds great—warm and intimate without sacrificing polish." At The Boston Globe, Sarah Rodman gave a positive review, stating that the release "finds the mighty-voiced McBride deftly tackling a clutch of pop, soul, and blues tunes complete with horns, a sultry Southern organ sound, and heavenly harmonies from the McCrary Sisters."

McBride embarked on the Everlasting Tour in supporting of the album beginning May 8, 2014, in Kansas.

== Track listing ==
No.	Title	Writer(s)	Original artist(s)	Length
1.	"Do Right Woman, Do Right Man"	Chips Moman, Dan Penn	Aretha Franklin	3:33
2.	"Suspicious Minds"	Mark James	Mark James	3:50
3.	"If You Don't Know Me by Now"	Kenny Gamble, Leon Huff	Harold Melvin & the Blue Notes	3:32
4.	"Little Bit of Rain"	Fred Neil	Fred Neil	2:20
5.	"Bring It On Home to Me" (with Gavin DeGraw)	Sam Cooke	Sam Cooke	3:33
6.	"Come See About Me"	Holland–Dozier–Holland	The Supremes	2:58
7.	"What Becomes of the Brokenhearted"	William Weatherspoon, Paul Riser, James Dean	Jimmy Ruffin	3:51
8.	"I've Been Loving You Too Long"	Otis Redding, Jerry Butler	Otis Redding	3:48
9.	"Wild Night"	Van Morrison	Van Morrison	3:06
10.	"In the Basement" (with Kelly Clarkson)	Billy Davis, Carl Williams Smith, Raynard Miner	Etta James and Sugar Pie DeSanto	2:39
11.	"My Babe"	Willie Dixon	Little Walter	3:09
12.	"To Know Him Is to Love Him"	Phil Spector	The Teddy Bears	2:42
Total length:				39:07

Target bonus tracks
No.	Title	Writer(s)	Original artist(s)	Length
13.	"That's How Strong My Love Is"	Roosevelt Jamison	O. V. Wright	3:00
14.	"Baby What You Want Me to Do"	Jimmy Reed	Jimmy Reed	3:35
Total length:				45:43

iTunes bonus tracks
No.	Title	Writer(s)	Original artist(s)	Length
13.	"By Your Side"	Sade Adu, Andrew Hale, Stuart Matthewman, Paul Spencer Denman	Sade	4:48
14.	"Perfect"	Pink, Max Martin, Shellback	Pink	4:27
Total length:				48:24

== Personnel ==
- Rayse Biggs – trumpet
- Tom Bukovac – acoustic and electric guitars
- Vinnie Ciesielski – trumpet
- Kelly Clarkson – duet vocals on "In the Basement"
- Eric Darken – percussion
- Gavin DeGraw – duet vocals on "Bring It On Home to Me"
- Charles Dixon – viola, violin
- Shannon Forrest – drums, percussion
- Edward Gooch – trombone
- Vicki Hampton – backing vocals
- Mike Henderson – electric guitar, harmonica
- Timothy Hewitt – alto saxophone
- John Hinchey – trombone
- Jim Hoke – horn arrangements, tenor saxophone
- Dann Huff – electric guitar
- Charlie Judge – organ, piano, strings
- Randy Leago – baritone saxophone
- Martina McBride – handclaps, acoustic guitar, lead and backing vocals
- Alfreda McCrary – handclaps, backing vocals
- Ann McCrary – handclaps, backing vocals
- Regina McCrary – handclaps, backing vocals
- Kevin McKendree – organ, piano, Wurlitzer
- Jim Medlin – Fender Rhodes, organ, piano, Wurlitzer
- Andrea Merritt – backing vocals
- Gordon Mote – Farfisa organ, piano
- Wendy Moten – backing vocals
- Patrick O'Conner – drums
- Steve Patrick – flugelhorn, trumpet
- Luis Resto – keyboards
- Michael Rhodes – bass guitar
- Paul Riser – horn arrangements, conductor
- Don Was – handclaps, producer
- Reggie Young – electric guitar

== Chart performance ==
The album debuted at No. 7 on the Billboard 200, and at No. 1 on the Top Country Albums chart, with sales of 21,000 in the US. The album has sold 70,000 copies in the U.S as of April 2016.

McBride made history with the album by becoming the first ever female artist in the 50-year history of the Top Country Albums chart to debut at No. 1 with an independently released and distributed album.

=== Weekly charts ===
Chart (2014)	Peak position
UK Country Albums (OCC)	2
US Billboard 200	7
US Top Country Albums (Billboard)	1
US Independent Albums (Billboard)	2

=== Year-end charts ===
Chart (2014)	Position
US Top Country Albums (Billboard)	73
