= Reckless (Martina McBride album) =

Studio album by Martina McBride
- Released: April 29, 2016
- Recorded: 2015–2016
- Studio: Blackbird (Nashville, Tennessee)
- Genre: Country
- Length: 35:27
- Label: Nash Icon
- Producer: Nathan Chapman; Dann Huff; Martina McBride

Martina McBride chronology
Everlasting (2014)	Reckless (2016)	It's the Holiday Season (2018)

Singles from Reckless
- 1. "Reckless" Released: March 10, 2016; 2. "Just Around the Corner" Released: June 13, 2016

Reckless is the thirteenth studio album by American country music singer Martina McBride. The album was released on April 29, 2016, by Nash Icon Records.

== Background ==
The track "It Ain't Pretty", written by Nicolle Galyon and Eric Paslay, was previously recorded by Lady Antebellum for their 2013 album Golden.

== Reception ==
The album debuted at No. 31 on the Billboard 200 chart on its release, and No. 2 on the Top Country Albums charts, selling 16,000 copies the first week. The album sold a further 5,000 copies the second week. The album has sold 35,400 copies in the US as of August 2016.

== Track listing ==
No.	Title	Writer(s)	Length
1.	"Reckless"	Sarah Buxton, Zach Crowell, Heather Morgan	3:31
2.	"It Ain't Pretty"	Nicolle Galyon, Eric Paslay	3:19
3.	"Just Around the Corner"	Buxton, Cary Barlowe, Sam Ellis	3:30
4.	"Everybody Wants to Be Loved"	Hillary Lindsey, Steve McEwan, Gordie Sampson	4:11
5.	"The Real Thing" (with Buddy Miller)	Ivy Walker, Sophie Walker, Hailey Whitters, Adam Wright	3:24
6.	"That's the Thing About Love"	Lindsey, Sampson, Troy Verges	3:29
7.	"Low All Afternoon"	Whitters	3:50
8.	"Diamond" (with Keith Urban)	Galyon, Paslay, Liz Rose	2:59
9.	"We'll Pick Up Where We Left Off"	Nathan Chapman, Blair Daly, Marc Roberge	4:15
10.	"You and You Alone"	Buxton, Abe Stoklasa, Daniel Tashian	2:59
Total length:			35:27

== Personnel ==
- Martina McBride – lead vocals, backing vocals (4, 6–9)
- Mike Rojas – acoustic piano (1–4, 6, 8, 9), synthesizers (1, 2), Hammond B3 organ (2, 5–9), Wurlitzer electric piano (5), accordion (9)
- Charlie Judge – synth pads (1), synthesizers (3), strings (3), programming (3, 5), French horn (5)
- Jim Medlin – acoustic piano (10)
- Nathan Chapman – programming (1, 3, 4, 9), acoustic guitar (1, 2, 5–9), mandolin (1, 5, 7), backing vocals (1, 4, 6, 7, 9), bass (2–6, 8, 9)
- Dann Huff – electric guitar (1–9), mandolin (3, 6), sitar (4), acoustic guitar (5, 9)
- Danny Rader – acoustic guitar (3, 4), mandolin (4)
- Dan Dugmore – steel guitar (1, 2, 7, 9), lap steel guitar (5), electric guitar (6)
- Paul Franklin – steel guitar (5, 6, 8)
- Michael Rhodes – bass (1, 7, 9)
- Matt Chamberlain – drums (1, 2, 7, 9), percussion (1, 9)
- Nick Buda – drums (3, 4), percussion (4)
- Shannon Forrest – drums (5, 6, 8), percussion (5, 6, 8)
- Jonathan Yudkin – cello (1), violin (1)
- Carole Rabinowitz – cello (2)
- Kristin Wilkinson – viola (2), string arrangements (2)
- David Angell – violin (2)
- David Davidson – violin (2)
- Sarah Buxton – backing vocals (1)
- Carolyn Dawn Johnson – backing vocals (2)
- Cherie Oakley – backing vocals (3)
- Jason Sever – backing vocals (3, 4, 6, 9)
- Buddy Miller – lead and backing vocals (5)
- Stephanie Chapman – backing vocals (6)
- Keith Urban – lead and backing vocals (8)

== Production ==
- Nathan Chapman – producer
- Dann Huff – producer
- Martina McBride – producer
- Allison Jones – A&R
- John McBride – recording, mixing (2, 4, 8–10)
- Allen Ditto – additional recording, recording assistant
- Ernesto Olivera – additional recording
- Adam Chagnon – additional engineer (9)
- Serbian Ghenea – mixing (1)
- John Hanes – mix engineer (1)
- Justin Niebank – mixing (3)
- Chris Lord-Alge – mixing (9)
- Nik Karpen – mix assistant (9)
- Sean Neff – digital editing (3, 7, 9)
- Adam Ayan – mastering
- Mike Griffith – production coordinator
- Laurel Kittleson – production coordinator
- Alicia Mathews – production coordinator
- Sandi Spika Borchetta – art direction
- Becky Reiser – art direction
- Karinne Caulkins – graphic design
- Joseph LIanes – photography
- Courtney Kivela Robinson – wardrobe stylist
- Melanie Shelley – hair, make-up

Studios

- Recorded at Blackbird Studio (Nashville, Tennessee).
- Mixed at Blackbird Studios; Hound's Ear Studio (Franklin, Tennessee); MixStar Studios (Virginia Beach, Virginia); Mix LA (Los Angeles, California).
- Mastered at Gateway Mastering (Portland, Maine).

== Charts ==
=== Weekly charts ===
Chart (2016)	Peak position
Canadian Albums (Billboard)	87
UK Country Albums (OCC)	3
US Billboard 200	31
US Top Country Albums (Billboard)	2

=== Year-end charts ===
Chart (2016)	Position
US Top Country Albums (Billboard)	61
