= There You Are (Martina McBride song) =

Single by Martina McBride

from the album Emotion
- Released: May 29, 2000
- Genre: Country
- Length: 3:26
- Label: RCA Nashville
- Songwriters: Ed Hill; Mark D. Sanders; Bob DiPiero
- Producers: Martina McBride; Paul Worley

Martina McBride singles chronology
"Love's the Only House" (1999)	"There You Are" (2000)	"It's My Time" (2000)

"There You Are" is a song written by Ed Hill, Mark D. Sanders and Bob DiPiero, and recorded by American country music artist Martina McBride. It was released in May 2000 as the third single from her album Emotion. The song was McBride's twelfth Top 10 hit on the U.S. Billboard Hot Country Singles & Tracks, and was her first Top 20 hit on the U.S. Adult Contemporary charts.

In 2001, it was included as a track on McBride's Greatest Hits album.

== Charts ==
"There You Are" re-entered the chart as a single at number 67 on the U.S. Billboard Hot Country Singles & Tracks for the week of May 20, 2000.

Chart (2000)	Peak position
Canada Country Singles (RPM)	19 (Note: "There You Are" had not yet peaked when RPM ceased publication in November 2000.)
US Hot Country Songs (Billboard)	10
US Billboard Hot 100	60
US Adult Contemporary (Billboard)	15

=== Year-end charts ===
Chart (2000)	Position
US Country Songs (Billboard)	39

== Release history ==
Release dates and format(s) for "There You Are"
Region	Date	Format(s)	Label(s)	Ref.
United States	May 30, 2000	Country radio	RCA Nashville	
United States	July 24, 2000	Adult contemporary radio	RCA Nashville	
