= White Christmas (Martina McBride album) =

- Cover of the 1999 re-release.

Studio album by Martina McBride
- Released: September 29, 1998
- Recorded: 1998
- Genre: Christmas; country
- Length: 41:06
- Label: RCA Nashville
- Producer: Rob Christie; Martina McBride; Patrick Williams; Paul Worley

Martina McBride chronology
Evolution (1997)	White Christmas (1998)	Emotion (1999)

Alternative covers
- Cover of the 2007 re-release.

Alternative cover
- Cover of the 2013 re-release.

Professional ratings
Review scores
Source	Rating
Allmusic	2.5/5 stars
Entertainment Weekly	B

White Christmas is the fifth album and first Christmas album by country singer Martina McBride issued by RCA Nashville in 1998. The album was reissued in 1999 with new artwork and two new tracks. It was re-released for the second time in October 2007 with newer artwork and four new tracks added. In 2013, it was reissued for a third time as The Classic Christmas Album. The re-release added her Elvis Presley duet, "Blue Christmas", which was originally released on his posthumous album Christmas Duets, while removing the track "Jingle Bells" and revising the track listing.

In the U.S. the album White Christmas was certified Gold by Recording Industry Association of America (RIAA) on November 9, 1999; then Platinum by the RIAA on November 10, 2003; and then double-Platinum by the RIAA on December 12, 2018. The album has sold 1,827,700 copies in the U.S. as of November 2017.

== Track listings ==
=== Original 1998 release ===
No.	Title	Writer(s)	Length
1.	"Have Yourself a Merry Little Christmas"	Hugh Martin, Ralph Blane	4:05
2.	"Let It Snow! Let It Snow! Let It Snow!"	Jule Styne, Sammy Cahn	1:44
3.	"The Christmas Song"	Mel Tormé, Robert Wells	3:38
4.	"O Holy Night"	Adolphe Adam, John Sullivan Dwight	3:43
5.	"Silver Bells"	Jay Livingston, Ray Evans	2:40
6.	"Away in a Manger"	Traditional	3:27
7.	"White Christmas"	Irving Berlin	3:18
8.	"What Child Is This?"	Traditional	3:45
9.	"I'll Be Home for Christmas"	Buck Ram, Kim Gannon, Walter Kent	3:10
10.	"Silent Night"	Franz Xaver Gruber, Josef Mohr	3:22
Total length:			32:52

=== 1999 re-release ===
No.	Title	Writer(s)	Length
1.	"Do You Hear What I Hear?"	Gloria Shayne Baker, Noël Regney	3:55
2.	"Have Yourself a Merry Little Christmas"	Martin, Blane	4:05
3.	"Let It Snow! Let It Snow! Let It Snow!"	Styne, Cahn	1:44
4.	"O Come All Ye Faithful"	Frederick Oakeley, John Francis Wade	3:58
5.	"The Christmas Song"	Tormé, Wells	3:38
6.	"O Holy Night"	Adam, Dwight	3:43
7.	"Silver Bells"	Livingston, Evans	2:40
8.	"Away in a Manger"	Traditional	3:27
9.	"White Christmas"	Berlin	3:18
10.	"What Child Is This?"	Traditional	3:45
11.	"I'll Be Home for Christmas"	Ram, Gannon, Kent	3:10
12.	"Silent Night"	Gruber, Mohr	3:22
Total length:			40:45

=== 2007 re-release ===
No.	Title	Writer(s)	Length
1.	"Let It Snow! Let It Snow! Let It Snow!"	Styne, Cahn	1:44
2.	"Have Yourself a Merry Little Christmas"	Martin, Blane	4:05
3.	"Silver Bells"	Livingston, Evans	2:40
4.	"Hark! The Herald Angels Sing"	Felix Mendelssohn, Charles Wesley	2:29
5.	"Do You Hear What I Hear?"	Baker, Regney	3:55
6.	"I'll Be Home for Christmas"	Ram, Gannon, Kent	3:10
7.	"Winter Wonderland"	Felix Bernard, Richard B. Smith	3:26
8.	"O Come All Ye Faithful"	Oakeley, Wade	3:58
9.	"Away in a Manger"	Traditional	3:27
10.	"Baby, It's Cold Outside" (with Dean Martin) (Martin vocal 1959; McBride vocal 2006)	Frank Loesser	2:55
11.	"Jingle Bells"	James Pierpont	2:13
12.	"White Christmas"	Berlin	3:18
13.	"Silent Night"	Gruber, Mohr	3:22
14.	"The Christmas Song"	Tormé, Wells	3:38
15.	"What Child Is This?"	Traditional	3:45
16.	"O Holy Night"	Adam, Dwight	3:43
Total length:			51:48

=== The Classic Christmas Album (2013 re-release) ===
No.	Title	Writer(s)	Length
1.	"Let It Snow! Let It Snow! Let It Snow!"	Styne, Cahn	1:44
2.	"Silver Bells"	Livingston, Evans	2:40
3.	"The Christmas Song"	Tormé, Wells	3:38
4.	"Do You Hear What I Hear?"	Baker, Regney	3:55
5.	"Hark! The Herald Angels Sing"	Mendelssohn, Wesley	2:29
6.	"Away in a Manger"	Traditional	3:27
7.	"Winter Wonderland"	Bernard, Smith	3:26
8.	"Have Yourself a Merry Little Christmas"	Martin, Blane	4:05
9.	"Blue Christmas" (with Elvis Presley [Presley vocal 1968; McBride vocal 2008])	Billy Hayes, Jay W. Johnson	2:13
10.	"O Come All Ye Faithful"	Oakeley, Wade	3:58
11.	"Silent Night"	Gruber, Mohr	3:22
12.	"White Christmas"	Berlin	3:18
13.	"Baby, It's Cold Outside" (with Dean Martin) (Martin vocal 1959; McBride vocal 2006)	Loesser	2:55
14.	"I'll Be Home for Christmas"	Ram, Gannon, Kent	3:10
15.	"What Child Is This?"	Traditional	3:45
16.	"O Holy Night"	Adam, Dwight	3:43
Total length:			51:48

== Personnel ==
- Martina McBride – lead vocals
- Jim Medlin – acoustic piano
- Steve Nathan – synthesizers
- Mark Jordan – synthesizers
- Matt Rollings – acoustic piano
- Brent Mason – electric guitars
- Biff Watson – acoustic guitars
- Joe Chemay – bass
- Shannon Forrest – drums
- Lonnie Wilson – drums
- Sam Bacco – percussion
- Eric Darken – percussion
- Karen Winkleman – recorder
- Skip Cleavnger – penny whistle
- Lee Levine – clarinet
- Ann Richards – flute
- Bobby Taylor – oboe
- Jim Ferguson – backing vocals
- Mark Ivey – backing vocals
- Marabeth Jordan – backing vocals
- Louis Nunley – backing vocals
- Lisa Silver – backing vocals
- Dennis Wilson – backing vocals

The Nashville String Machine

- Dennis Burnside – string arrangements and conductor
- Carl Gorodetzky – contractor
- Chris Dunn – music preparation
- John Catchings, Anthony LaMarchina, Bob Mason and Julie Tanner – cello
- Craig Nelson – string bass
- Mary Alice Hoepfinger – harp
- Monisa Angell, Jim Grosjean, Gary Vanosdale and Kristin Wilkinson – viola
- David Angell, Janet Askey, Carolyn Bailey, Joann Cruthirds, David Davidson, Conni Ellisor, Carl Gorodetzky, Gerald Greer, Lee Larrison, Cate Myer, Pamela Sixfin, Elisabeth Small, Alan Umstead, Cathy Umstead, Mary Kathryn Vanosdale and Karen Winkleman – violin

== Production ==
- Martina McBride – producer
- Paul Worley – producer
- Rob Christie – producer
- Patrick Williams – producer
- Clarke Schleicher – recording, additional engineer, mixing
- Jim Burnett – additional engineer
- Tony Green – additional engineer, mix assistant
- Mike Poole – additional engineer
- Ed Simonton – additional engineer
- Sandy Jenkins – additional assistant engineer, mix assistant
- Eric Bickel – recording assistant
- Greg Fogie – recording assistant
- Erik Hellerman – recording assistant
- Greg Parker – recording assistant
- Scott Phillips – recording assistant
- Glenn Spinner – recording assistant
- Carlos Grier – digital editing
- Eric Conn – digital editing
- Denny Purcell – mastering
- Jonathan Russell – mastering assistant
- Deb Boyle – production coordinator
- Paige Connors – production coordinator
- Susan Eaddy – art direction
- Mary Hamilton – art direction
- Julie Wanca – design
- Andrew Eccles – photography
- Kristin Barlowe – 2007 photography
- Claudia Fowler – wardrobe stylist
- Earl Cox – hair stylist
- Mary Beth Felts – make-up
- Bruce Allen – management

Studios

- Recorded at Ocean Way, Emerald Studios and The Tracking Room (Nashville, Tennessee).
- Additional engineering at The Money Pit, Emerald Studios, Masterfonics, Seventeen Grand Recording, Sound Stage Studios and The Love Shack (Nashville, Tennessee).
- Mixed at Sound Stage Studios and The Money Pit.
- Mastered and Digitally Edited at Georgetown Masters (Nashville, Tennessee).

== Charts and certifications ==
=== Weekly charts ===
==== White Christmas ====
Chart (1998)	Peak position
US Billboard 200	64
US Top Country Albums (Billboard)	9
US Top Holiday Albums (Billboard)	6

==== The Classic Christmas Album ====
Chart (2013)	Peak position
US Billboard 200	177
US Top Country Albums (Billboard)	27

=== Year-end charts ===
White Christmas
Chart (1999)	Position
US Top Country Albums (Billboard)	48

=== Charted songs ===
Year	Song	Peak positions
Year	Song	US Country
1998	"Let It Snow! Let It Snow! Let It Snow!"	64
2000	"The Christmas Song"	67
2000	"White Christmas"	62
2000	"Have Yourself a Merry Little Christmas"	53
2001	"O Holy Night"	41
2006	"Baby, It's Cold Outside" (with Dean Martin)	35

=== Certifications and sales ===
Region	Certification	Certified units/sales
Canada (Music Canada)	Gold	50,000^{^}
United States (RIAA)	2× Platinum	1,827,700
^{^} Shipments figures based on certification alone.

== Release history ==
Region	Date	Label	Format
United States	September 29, 1998	RCA Nashville	CD, Cassette (10 tracks)
United States	September 14, 1999	RCA Nashville	CD (12 tracks)
United States	October 2, 2007	RCA Nashville	CD, digital download (16 tracks)
United States	October 6, 2009	Legacy Recordings	CD+DVD
United States	October 8, 2013	Legacy Recordings	CD, digital download (16 tracks)
