= It's the Holiday Season =

Studio album by Martina McBride
- Released: October 19, 2018
- Studio: Capitol (Hollywood, California); Blackbird (Berry Hill, Tennessee)
- Genre: Country, Christmas
- Length: 26:15
- Label: Broken Bow
- Producer: Martina McBride

Martina McBride chronology
Reckless (2016)	It's the Holiday Season (2018)

It's the Holiday Season is the fourteenth studio album and second Christmas album by Martina McBride. It was released on October 19, 2018.

== Commercial performance ==
The album debuted at No. 8 on the Billboard Holiday Albums chart, with 1,400 copies sold in the first week. It has sold 15,100 copies in the United States as of January 2019.

This was the last recording composer Patrick Williams contributed prior to his death. The album is dedicated in memory to him.

== Track listing ==
CD
No.	Title	Writer(s)	Length
1.	"Santa Claus Is Coming to Town"	John Frederick Coots; Haven Gillespie	2:47
2.	"It’s the Most Wonderful Time of the Year"	Edward Pola; George Wyle	3:31
3.	"Winter Wonderland"	Felix Bernard; Richard B. Smith	2:56
4.	"It's Beginning to Look a Lot Like Christmas"	Meredith Willson	2:39
5.	"Rudolph the Red-Nosed Reindeer"	Johnny Marks	2:38
6.	"Happy Holiday / It's the Holiday Season"	Irving Berlin / Kay Thompson	2:15
7.	"Home for the Holidays"	Robert Allen; Al Stillman	3:15
8.	"Frosty the Snowman"	Walter E. Rollins; Steve Nelson	3:02
9.	"My Favorite Things"	Richard Rodgers; Oscar Hammerstein II	3:12
Total length:			26:15

== Personnel ==
Vocals and Rhythm Section

- Martina McBride – lead vocals
- Tom Ranier – grand piano
- Graham Dechter – guitar
- Chuck Berghofer – bass guitar
- Peter Erskine – drums
- Daniel Greco – percussion
- Mark Ivey – backing vocals
- Marabeth Quil – backing vocals
- Kira Small – backing vocals
- Bergen White – backing vocals, vocal arrangements

Orchestra

- Patrick Williams – arrangements and conductor
- Elliot Deutsch – additional arrangements (6)
- Joe Soldo – contractor
- Ralph Morrison – concertmaster
- Gordon Berger, Bill Edwards, J.B. Griffiths, Daniel Perito and Terry Woodson – music copyists

Horns

- Dan Higgins and Don Shelton – alto saxophones
- Gene Cipriano – baritone saxophone
- Jeff Driskill and Bob Sheppard – tenor saxophones
- Ben Devitt – bass trombone
- Charles Loper, Bob McChesney and Charlie Morillas – tenor trombones
- Wayne Bergeron, Chuck Findley, Rob Schaer and Michael Stever – trumpet

Strings

- Timothy Loo, Christina Soule and John Walz – cello
- Amy Wilkins – harp
- Andrew Duckles, Matt Funes and Carolyn Riley – viola
- Darius Campo, Neel Hammond, Carrie Kennedy, Johana Krejci, Joel Pargman, Alyssa Park, Radu Pieptea, Neil Samples, Mary Sloan, Jenny Takamatsu and Ina Veli – violin

== Production ==
- Martina McBride – producer
- Al Schmitt – recording, mixing
- Steve Genewick – recording assistant
- Chandler Harrod – mix assistant
- Allen Ditto – vocal recording
- John McBride – additional mixing
- Jory Roberts – additional mix assistant
- Chris Small – digital editing
- Ryan Smith – mastering at Sterling Sound (New York City, New York)
- Glenn Sweitzer – package design
- Joseph Llanes – photography
- Courtney Kivela Robinson – wardrobe stylist
- Lindsay Doyle – hair, make-up
