= Emotion (Martina McBride album) =

Studio album by Martina McBride
- Released: September 14, 1999
- Genre: Country
- Length: 46:54
- Label: RCA Nashville
- Producer: Martina McBride; Paul Worley

Martina McBride chronology
| White Christmas (1998) | Emotion (1999) | Greatest Hits (2001) |

Singles from Emotion
- 1. "I Love You" Released: July 26, 1999; 2. "Love's the Only House" Released: November 15, 1999; 3. "There You Are" Released: May 15, 2000; 4. "It's My Time" Released: December 18, 2000

Professional ratings
Review scores
| Source | Rating |
|---|---|
| AllMusic | 4/5 stars |
| Chicago Tribune | (favorable) |
| Entertainment Weekly | B+ |

Emotion is the sixth studio album by American country music artist Martina McBride. It was released in September 1999 by RCA Nashville. The album produced four singles with "I Love You", "Love's the Only House", "There You Are" and "It's My Time" on the US Billboard Hot Country Songs chart. The song "I Love You" became McBride's biggest hit single to date after it reached number one on the country charts and peaked at number 24 on the Billboard Hot 100. The album ends with two covers, "Goodbye" by Patty Griffin and Gretchen Peters' "This Uncivil War" from Peters' 1996 debut album The Secret of Life. The album was certified Platinum on by the RIAA.

== Track listing ==
Emotion track listing
| No. | Title | Writer(s) | Length |
|---|---|---|---|
| 1. | "Do What You Do" | Angelo Petraglia, Georgia Middleman | 3:26 |
| 2. | "Anything's Better Than Feelin' the Blues" | Matraca Berg, Randy Scruggs | 3:01 |
| 3. | "I Love You" | Keith Follesé, Adrienne Follesé, Tammy Hyler | 2:52 |
| 4. | "Make Me Believe" | James LeBlanc, Don Srygley | 3:50 |
| 5. | "Love's the Only House" | Buzz Cason, Tom Douglas | 5:13 |
| 6. | "There You Are" | Ed Hill, Mark D. Sanders, Bob DiPiero | 3:26 |
| 7. | "It's My Time" | Hyler, Billy Crain, Kim Tribble | 3:35 |
| 8. | "I Ain't Goin' Nowhere" | Tia Sillers, Sanders | 3:48 |
| 9. | "Anything and Everything" | Gordon Kennedy, Wayne Kirkpatrick, Billy Mann | 3:44 |
| 10. | "From the Ashes" | Austin Cunningham, Hillary Lindsey | 4:38 |
| 11. | "Goodbye" | Patty Griffin | 4:06 |
| 12. | "This Uncivil War" | Gretchen Peters | 5:07 |
| 13. | "For the Love of a Woman" (International bonus track) | Tyler Castleton, Staci Peters | 3:56 |
| Total length: | | | 46:54 |

== Personnel ==
=== Musicians ===
- Martina McBride – lead vocals, backing vocals (1–4, 7, 9, 11)
- John Hobbs – Wurlitzer electric piano (1, 3), Hammond B3 organ (3, 5, 7, 8), acoustic piano (5, 6, 10, 11), keyboards (9), synthesizers (10)
- Steve Nathan – Wurlitzer electric piano (2), Hammond B3 organ (4), synthesizers (5), keyboards (12)
- J. T. Corenflos – electric guitar
- Dann Huff – electric guitar (1, 3, 7, 8)
- Biff Watson – electric guitar (1, 3), acoustic guitar (2, 4, 6, 8, 9, 10, 12), bouzouki (8)
- Paul Worley – acoustic guitar (2, 4, 7, 9, 11), 12-string acoustic guitar (9, 11)
- Dan Dugmore – electric guitar solo (2, 7, 11), 12-string electric guitar (5)
- B. James Lowry – acoustic guitar (5, 7, 11)
- Doug Lancio – electric guitar (11), bouzouki (11)
- Paul Franklin – steel guitar (10)
- Joe Chemay – bass
- Mark Hammond – drum programming (1)
- Lonnie Wilson – drums (1–9, 11, 12)
- Greg Morrow – drums (10)
- Tom Roady – percussion (3, 5, 11)
- Terry McMillan – percussion (8, 9, 12)
- Michael Poole – percussion loop (9)
- Tom Douglas – harmonica (5)
- Aubrey Haynie – fiddle (12)
- John Mock – penny whistle (12)
- John Catchings – cello (6, 11)
- Anthony LaMarchina – cello (9)
- Kristin Wilkinson – viola (6, 11)
- David Davidson – violin (6, 11)
- Karen Winkelmann – violin (6, 9, 11)
- Pamela Sixfin – violin (11)
- Carolyn Dawn Johnson – backing vocals (3, 9)
- The "Cheaptones" (Tom Douglas, Erik Hellerman, Martina McBride and Paul Worley) – backing vocals (5)
- Wes Hightower – backing vocals (8)
- Troy Johnson – backing vocals (8)
- Gordon Kennedy – backing vocals (9)
- Wayne Kirkpatrick – backing vocals (9)

=== Production ===
- Martina McBride – producer
- Paul Worley – producer
- Clarke Schleicher – recording (1–9, 11, 12), mixing
- Mike Poole – recording (10), additional recording
- Jim Burnett – additional engineer
- Erik Hellerman – additional recording, recording assistant, mix assistant
- Sandy Jenkins – recording assistant
- Chris Scherbak – recording assistant
- Jed Hackett – mix assistant (1, 2, 4–12)
- Greg Fogie – mix assistant (3)
- Don Cobb – digital editing
- Carlos Grier – digital editing
- Denny Purcell – mastering
- Jonathan Russell – mastering assistant
- Paige Connors – production coordinator
- Mary Hamilton – art direction
- Gina Binkley and Alter Ego Design – design
- Matthew Rolston – photography
- Gemina Aboitiz – wardrobe stylist
- Robert Vetica – hair stylist
- Collier Strong – make-up

Studios

- Recorded at The Money Pit and Seventeen Grand Recording (Nashville, Tennessee)
- Mixed at The Money Pit and Ocean Way (Nashville, Tennessee)
- Digitally edited and mastered at Georgetown Masters (Nashville, Tennessee)

== Chart performance ==
=== Weekly charts ===
Weekly chart performance for Emotion
| Chart (1999) | Peak position |
|---|---|
| Canadian Albums (RPM) | 66 |
| Canadian Country Albums (RPM) | 5 |
| US Billboard 200 | 19 |
| US Top Country Albums (Billboard) | 3 |

=== Year-end charts ===
Year-end chart performance for Emotion
| Chart (1999) | Position |
|---|---|
| US Top Country Albums (Billboard) | 23 |
| Chart (2000) | Position |
| US Billboard 200 | 185 |
| US Top Country Albums (Billboard) | 17 |
| Chart (2001) | Position |
| US Top Country Albums (Billboard) | 64 |

== Certifications ==
Certifications for Emotion
| Region | Certification | Certified units/sales |
|---|---|---|
| Canada (Music Canada) | Platinum | 100,000^{^} |
| United States (RIAA) | Platinum | 1,000,000^{^} |
^{^} Shipments figures based on certification alone.
