= Timeless (Martina McBride album) =

Studio album by Martina McBride
- Released: October 18, 2005
- Recorded: 2005
- Studios: Blackbird (Nashville, Tennessee); Radio Recorders (Los Angeles, California)
- Genre: Country
- Length: 54:32
- Label: RCA Nashville
- Producer: Martina McBride

Martina McBride chronology
Martina (2003)	Timeless (2005)	Waking Up Laughing (2007)

Singles from Timeless
- 1. "(I Never Promised You A) Rose Garden" Released: August 15, 2005; 2. "I Still Miss Someone" Released: January 2006

Professional ratings
Review scores
Source	Rating
About.com	4.5/5 stars
AllMusic	4.5/5 stars
Country Weekly	(average)
Entertainment Weekly	B+
People	4/4 stars
Slant Magazine	1.5/5 stars
Stylus Magazine	A−

Timeless is the eighth studio album by the American country music singer Martina McBride. The album was released on October 18, 2005, through RCA Nashville Records. The album is McBride's first covers album, containing covers of classic country songs made famous by artists such as Buck Owens, Eddy Arnold, Johnny Cash, Don Gibson and Loretta Lynn.

The album debuted at number 3 on the Billboard 200, and number 1 on the Top Country Albums chart with 185,000 copies sold in the first week. The album was certified platinum on December 12, 2005, by the RIAA.

== Track listing ==
No.	Title	Writer(s)	Original artist(s)	Length
1.	"You Win Again"	Hank Williams	Hank Williams	2:59
2.	"I'll Be There" (featuring Dan Tyminski and Rhonda Vincent)	Ray Price, Rusty Gabbard	Ray Price	2:18
3.	"I Can't Stop Loving You"	Don Gibson	Don Gibson	4:21
4.	"(I Never Promised You A) Rose Garden"	Joe South	Lynn Anderson	3:15
5.	"Today I Started Loving You Again"	Merle Haggard, Bonnie Owens	Merle Haggard	3:46
6.	"You Ain't Woman Enough"	Loretta Lynn	Loretta Lynn	2:12
7.	"Once a Day"	Bill Anderson	Connie Smith	2:23
8.	"Pick Me Up on Your Way Down"	Harlan Howard	Charlie Walker	2:40
9.	"I Don't Hurt Anymore"	Don Robertson, Walter E. Rollins	Hank Snow	3:08
10.	"True Love Ways"	Buddy Holly, Norman Petty	Buddy Holly	3:14
11.	"'Til I Can Make It on My Own"	George Richey, Billy Sherrill, Tammy Wynette	Tammy Wynette	3:17
12.	"I Still Miss Someone" (featuring Dolly Parton)	Johnny Cash, Roy Cash Jr.	Johnny Cash	2:56
13.	"Heartaches by the Number" (featuring Dwight Yoakam)	Harlan Howard	Ray Price	3:06
14.	"Satin Sheets"	John Volinkaty	Jeanne Pruett	3:20
15.	"Thanks a Lot"	Eddie Miller, Don Sessions	Ernest Tubb	2:35
16.	"Love's Gonna Live Here"	Buck Owens	Buck Owens	2:01
17.	"Make the World Go Away"	Hank Cochran	Ray Price	2:57
18.	"Help Me Make It Through the Night"	Kris Kristofferson	Kris Kristofferson	4:04
19.	"Let It Be Me" (iTunes pre-order bonus track)	Gilbert Bécaud, Mann Curtis	Gilbert Bécaud	3:36
Total length:				58:08

International bonus tracks
No.	Title	Writer(s)	Original artist(s)	Length
19.	"Dreaming My Dreams"	Allen Reynolds	Waylon Jennings	3:51
20.	"Cryin' Time"	Buck Owens	Buck Owens	3:09
21.	"Walk On By"	Kendall Hayes	Leroy Van Dyke	2:27
22.	"Take These Chains from My Heart"	Fred Rose, Hy Heath	Hank Williams	3:10
Total length:				70:45

Limited edition bonus DVD
No.	Title	Length
1.	"The Making of Timeless"
2.	"Photo Gallery"

== Personnel ==
- Martina McBride – lead vocals, harmony vocals
- Gordon Mote – acoustic piano, Wurlitzer electric piano, Hammond B3 organ
- Steve Gibson – acoustic guitar, electric guitars, dobro, mandolin
- Marty Schiff – acoustic guitar
- Paul Worley – acoustic guitar
- Stuart Duncan – mandolin, fiddle
- Paul Franklin – dobro, steel guitar
- Larry Paxton – electric bass, upright bass, tic-tac bass
- Glenn Worf – electric bass, upright bass
- Eddie Bayers – drums
- Jonathan Yudkin – strings (11), string arrangements (11)
- Lisa Cochran – harmony vocals
- Melodie Crittenden – harmony vocals
- Jon Mark Ivey – harmony vocals
- Marabeth Jordan – harmony vocals
- John Wesley Ryles – harmony vocals
- Russell Terrell – harmony vocals
- Bergen White – harmony vocals, vocal arrangements

Guest Vocals

- Dan Tyminski – vocals (2)
- Rhonda Vincent – vocals (2)
- Dolly Parton – harmony vocals (12)
- Dwight Yoakam – harmony vocals (13)

The Nashville String Machine

- Dennis Burnside – string arrangements and conductor
- Carl Gorodetzky – contractor
- Anthony LaMarchina and Sarighani Reist – cello
- Jim Grosjean, Gary Vanosdale and Kristin Wilkinson – viola
- David Angell, Janet Askey, David Davidson, Conni Ellisor, Carl Gorodetzky, Cate Myer, Pamela Sixfin, Christian Teal, Alan Umstead, Cathy Umstead, Mary Kathryn Vanosdale and Karen Winklemann – violin

== Production ==
- Martina McBride – producer
- John McBride – recording, mixing, management
- John Netti – recording assistant, mix assistant
- Vance Powell – recording assistant, mix assistant
- Lowell Reynolds – recording assistant, mix assistant
- David Robinson – recording assistant, mix assistant
- Michael Dumas – vocal recording for Dwight Yoakam (13)
- Richard Dodd – mastering at RichardDodd.com (Nashville, Tennessee)
- Paige Connors – production coordinator
- S. Wade Hunt – art direction, design
- Andrew Eccles – photography
- Sam Erickson – studio photography
- Claudia Fowler – wardrobe stylist
- Earl Cox – hair stylist
- Mary Beth Felts – make-up
- Bruce Allen – management

== Charts ==
=== Weekly charts ===
Chart (2005)	Peak position
US Billboard 200	3
US Top Country Albums (Billboard)	1

=== Year-end charts ===
Chart (2005)	Position
US Billboard 200	168
US Top Country Albums (Billboard)	29
Chart (2006)	Position
US Billboard 200	79
US Top Country Albums (Billboard)	20

=== Singles ===
Year	Single	Chart Positions	
Year	Single	US Country	US
2005	"(I Never Promised You) A Rose Garden"	18	98
2006	"I Still Miss Someone" (featuring Dolly Parton)	50	—

== Certifications ==
In 2005, Timeless was certified platinum by the RIAA.
