= It's My Time (Martina McBride song) =

Single by Martina McBride

from the album Emotion
- Released: December 18, 2000
- Genre: Country
- Length: 3:35
- Label: RCA Nashville
- Songwriters: Tammy Hyler; Billy Crain; Kim Tribble
- Producers: Martina McBride; Paul Worley

Martina McBride singles chronology
"There You Are" (2000)	"It's My Time" (2000)	"When God-Fearin' Women Get the Blues" (2001)

"It's My Time" is a song written by Tammy Hyler, Billy Crain and Kim Tribble, and recorded by American country music artist Martina McBride. It was released in December 2000 as the fourth single from McBride's album Emotion. The song peaked at number 11 on the U.S. Billboard Hot Country Singles & Tracks and at number 2 on the U.S. Billboard Bubbling Under Hot 100. It was her first solo single since 1997's "Cry on the Shoulder of the Road" to miss the Top 10.

== Chart performance ==
"It's My Time" debuted at number 63 on the U.S. Billboard Hot Country Singles & Tracks for the week of December 23, 2000.

Chart (2000–2001)	Peak position
US Hot Country Songs (Billboard)	11
US Bubbling Under Hot 100 (Billboard)	2
