= I Love You (Martina McBride song) =

1999 single by Martina McBride

Single by Martina McBride

from the album Runaway Bride: Music from the Motion Picture and Emotion
- B-side: "Whatever You Say"
- Released: July 26, 1999
- Genre: Country pop
- Length: 2:52
- Label: RCA Nashville; BMG
- Songwriters: Keith Follesé; Adrienne Follesé; Tammy Hyler
- Producers: Paul Worley; Martina McBride

Martina McBride singles chronology
"Whatever You Say" (1999)	"I Love You" (1999)	"Love's the Only House" (1999)

"I Love You" is a song by American country music artist Martina McBride. It was written by Keith Follesé, Adrienne Follesé, and Tammy Hyler along with being produced by McBride and Paul Worley. It was recorded for the soundtrack of the 1999 film Runaway Bride and was released as the lead single from McBride's sixth studio album, Emotion (1999).

Released originally to country radio in July 1999, "I Love You" spent five weeks atop the US Billboard Hot Country Singles & Tracks chart. It also became a crossover hit, peaking at number 21 on the Billboard Adult Contemporary chart and number 24 on the Billboard Hot 100. Worldwide, it became a top-40 hit in Australia and Italy. The song would later be included in her Greatest Hits package.

== Critical reception ==
Deborah Evans Price of Billboard magazine gave a favorable review, comparing the song to Faith Hill's "This Kiss". In his retrospective series "Every No. 1 Single of the Nineties", Kevin John Coyne gave it an unfavorable review, calling it a "This Kiss" re-write "sung in a baby voice that would've made even Barbara Fairchild say, 'That's a bit much.'"

== Chart performance ==
"I Love You" debuted at No. 43 on the US Billboard Hot Country Singles & Tracks chart for the week of July 31, 1999. It subsequently reached No. 1 in late 1999 and remained there for five consecutive weeks. The song also charted at No. 24 on the Billboard Hot 100 and No. 21 on the Billboard Adult Contemporary chart.

== Music video ==
The song's music video shows McBride singing in a dress at a wedding hall, with video screens of the Runaway Bride film in the background. It was directed by Gerry Wenner.

== Track listings ==
US 7-inch single

A. "I Love You" (single version) – 2:53
B. "Whatever You Say" – 4:29

Australian CD single

1. "I Love You" (pop version) – 2:53
2. "I Love You" (remix) – 2:53
3. "Happy Girl" – 3:27

German CD single

1. "I Love You" (album version) – 2:53
2. "I Love You" (single version) – 2:53

UK CD single

1. "I Love You" (international remix) – 2:54
2. "I Love You" (Runaway Bride system) – 2:52
3. "Happy Girl" – 3:26

European CD single

1. "I Love You" (pop version) – 2:52
2. "Happy Girl" – 3:27
3. "Valentine" – 3:13

== Charts ==
=== Weekly charts ===
Chart (1999)	Peak position
Australia (ARIA)	38
Canada Adult Contemporary (RPM)	20
Canada Country Singles (RPM)	1
Germany (GfK)	79
Italy (FIMI)	21
US Billboard Hot 100	24
US Adult Contemporary (Billboard)	21
US Hot Country Songs (Billboard)	1

=== Year-end charts ===
Chart (1999)	Position
Canada Country Tracks (RPM)	5
US Adult Contemporary (Billboard)	50
US Hot Country Singles & Tracks (Billboard)	24

Chart (2000)	Position
US Hot Country Singles & Tracks (Billboard)	50

== Release history ==
Region	Date	Format(s)	Label(s)	Ref(s).
United States	July 26, 1999	Country radio	RCA Nashville; BMG	
United States	August 2, 1999	Adult contemporary; hot adult contemporary; modern adult contemporary radio	RCA Nashville; BMG	
