= This One's for the Girls =

2003 single by Martina McBride

Single by Martina McBride

from the album Martina
- Released: June 9, 2003
- Genre: Country
- Length: 4:04
- Label: RCA Nashville
- Songwriters: Chris Lindsey; Hillary Lindsey; Aimee Mayo
- Producers: Martina McBride; Paul Worley

Martina McBride singles chronology
"Concrete Angel" (2002)	"This One's for the Girls" (2003)	"In My Daughter's Eyes" (2003)

Music video
- "This One's for the Girls" at CMT.com

"This One's for the Girls" is a song written by Chris Lindsey, Hillary Lindsey, and Aimee Mayo and recorded by American country music singer Martina McBride. It was released in June 2003 as the first single from McBride's seventh studio album, Martina. The song peaked at number three on the US Billboard Hot Country Singles & Tracks charts and at number 39 on the Billboard Hot 100. The song was also a number-one hit on the Adult Contemporary charts. A remixed version of "This One's for the Girls" was included on her 2008 compilation album Playlist: The Very Best of Martina McBride.

== Content ==
The song's lyrics are a salute to women of various ages (who are "about thirteen," "about twenty-five," and "about forty-two") dealing with the struggles of different phases of life–starting high school and facing new pressures, coping with uncertainty about a career, and reaching middle age–and tells them "You're beautiful the way you are." McBride's first two daughters, Delaney and Emma, sing backing vocals on the song, as do fellow country singers Carolyn Dawn Johnson and Faith Hill.

== Personnel ==
Personnel are taken from the Martina liner notes.

- Martina McBride – lead and backing vocals
- John Hobbs – Hammond B3 organ
- B. James Lowry – acoustic guitar
- Biff Watson – acoustic guitar
- J. T. Corenflos – electric guitar
- Dann Huff – electric guitar
- Dan Dugmore – 12-string guitar, steel guitar
- Jimmie Lee Sloas – bass
- Lonnie Wilson – drums
- David Huff – drum programming
- Faith Hill – backing vocals
- Carolyn Dawn Johnson – backing vocals
- Hillary Lindsey – backing vocals
- Aimee Mayo – backing vocals
- Delaney McBride – backing vocals
- Emma McBride – backing vocals

== Charts ==
=== Weekly charts ===
Chart (2003)	Peak position
US Billboard Hot 100	39
US Adult Contemporary (Billboard)	1
US Adult Pop Airplay (Billboard)	32
US Hot Country Songs (Billboard)	3

=== Year-end charts ===
Chart (2003)	Position
US Hot Country Singles & Tracks (Billboard)	28

Chart (2004)	Position
US Adult Contemporary (Billboard)	6
US Adult Top 40 (Billboard)	92

== Certifications ==
Region	Certification	Certified units/sales
United States (RIAA)	Platinum	1,000,000^{‡}
^{‡} Sales+streaming figures based on certification alone.
