= Concrete Angel =

Single by Martina McBride

from the album Greatest Hits
- B-side: "Where Would You Be"
- Released: November 2002
- Recorded: 2001
- Genre: Country pop
- Length: 4:12
- Label: RCA Nashville
- Songwriters: Stephanie Bentley; Rob Crosby
- Producers: Martina McBride; Paul Worley

Martina McBride singles chronology
"Practice Life" (2002)	"Concrete Angel" (2002)	"This One's for the Girls" (2003)

Music video
- "Concrete Angel" on YouTube

"Concrete Angel" is a song written by Stephanie Bentley and Rob Crosby, and recorded by American country music artist Martina McBride. It was released in November 2002 as the fourth and last single from McBride's Greatest Hits compilation album. The song reached number 5 on the country music charts. "Concrete Angel" was ranked No. 1 by Rolling Stone on its list of the 40 Saddest Country Songs of All Time in 2019.

== Content ==
The song is a power ballad, centering on a main theme of child abuse. The narrator tells a story about a little girl who endures severe abuse. The abuse is silently questioned by her teachers and neighbors, but goes unreported. By the song's end, the girl dies and goes on to an afterlife where "she is loved" more than she was on earth.

== Personnel ==
The following musicians perform on this track:

- Matt Chamberlain – drums
- David Huff – programming
- B. James Lowry – acoustic guitar
- Martina McBride – lead vocals
- Jerry McPherson – electric guitar
- Steve Nathan – piano, synthesizer
- Biff Watson – acoustic guitar
- Glenn Worf – bass guitar

== Music video ==
The video was directed and produced by Deaton Flanigen. While McBride sings this song in the cemetery, Angela Carter (played by Noel Wiggins) is the 7-year-old daughter of an abusive, domineering mother. The girl's mother is shown disheveled and smoking a cigarette, as Angela is walking to school, and another little girl looks at her and then laughs at her, which could imply she was also a victim of bullying. While she is at school, the teacher and her classmates ignore the bruises on her body, either because they think she just had a minor accident or they want to avoid having problems with her family. One day, a young boy (played by Luke Benward) around her age befriends her. One night, Angela and the boy are talking to each other from their bedroom windows, but her mother catches her and beats her to death, which is shown by her mother's shadow. After the beating, police officers and an ambulance are shown at her house, assuming that some neighbors had heard the noise and called the authorities, and the mother is arrested. At the funeral, Angela's grave marked as 1995 - 2002 is shown, surrounded by a group of people, including her school teacher, some of her classmates, and her only friend. It is implied that the boy is the ghost of a young child who was killed from being abused and then came to her before she passed and showed her friendship. The music video ends when the boy passes through the adults, hugs the spirit of Angela and they both run to meet a group of other abused children as they run off into the horizon. When the video was originally released, it featured the phone number for the American Child Abuse Hotline and encouraged viewers to report abuse. The music video received a nomination for a Grammy Award for Best Music Video.

== Cover versions ==
- Spanish singer Marta Sánchez covered the song as "Cómo Un Ángel" in her album Soy Yo, released in 2002.
- Canadian Idol winner Melissa O'Neil covered the song on the album High Notes.
- Jackie Evancho covered this song in her album Prelude to a Dream which was a self-produced CD available briefly as a demo album in 2009 when she was nine years old.

Norwegian artist “Frøya” covered this song, naming it “Sorgfulle barn”, from the album “Jenta fra landet”, 2008.

== Chart performance ==
"Concrete Angel" debuted at number 52 on the U.S. Billboard Hot Country Singles & Tracks for the week of November 30, 2002.

Chart (2002–2003)	Peak position
US Hot Country Songs (Billboard)	5
US Billboard Hot 100	47

=== Year-end charts ===
Chart (2003)	Position
US Country Songs (Billboard)	33

== Certifications ==
Region	Certification	Certified units/sales
United States (RIAA)	Platinum	1,000,000^{‡}
^{‡} Sales+streaming figures based on certification alone.
