= Love's the Only House =

Single by Martina McBride

from the album Emotion
- Released: November 15, 1999
- Genre: Country
- Length: 5:13
- Label: RCA Nashville
- Songwriters: Buzz Cason; Tom Douglas
- Producers: Martina McBride; Paul Worley

Martina McBride singles chronology
| "I Love You" (1999) | "Love's the Only House" (1999) | "There You Are" (2000) |

"Love's the Only House" is a song written by Buzz Cason and Tom Douglas, and recorded by American country music artist Martina McBride. It was released in November 1999 as the second single from her album Emotion.

== Content ==
This up-tempo song that describes how a woman sees various people (such as woman in grocery store and a previous lover) and notices the problems that they have developed. The woman describes to the people she sees in each situation that love is the only place where they can release their pain and emotions. McBride said of the song's topic, "I love what it says and I love the fact that it urges us to take responsibility for our fellow human beings. Sometimes we all get so jaded (myself included) that we forget what compassion feels like."

McBride said that she came to record the song after discussing Collin Raye's single "Little Rock" with producer Paul Worley, who also produced that song. Worley called the publisher of "Love's the Only House", co-written by "Little Rock" writer Tom Douglas, and Worley requested that the publisher bring over the song despite the publisher saying that it was "more of a guy's song". McBride then got together with Douglas and changed some of the lines to fit a female perspective better.

== Critical reception ==
Deborah Evans Price of Billboard gave the song a positive review, saying that it was "set against a spiky harmonica, snappy percussion, and a nice medley of guitars" and "another grade-A success story from country's brightest female presence."

== Chart performance ==
"Love's the Only House" debuted at number 62 on the U.S. Billboard Hot Country Singles & Tracks for the week of November 20, 1999. "Love's the Only House" was the second track released from McBride's album, Emotion. Like the album's previous single, "I Love You, " the song was a major hit, reaching number 3 on the Hot Country Songs chart, as well as number 42 on the Billboard Hot 100. In addition, it also peaked at number 2 on the Canadian RPM Tracks chart that same year.

| Chart (1999–2000) | Peak position |
|---|---|
| Canada Country Singles (RPM) | 2 |
| US Billboard Hot 100 | 42 |
| US Hot Country Songs (Billboard) | 3 |

=== Year-end charts ===
| Chart (2000) | Position |
|---|---|
| US Country Songs (Billboard) | 16 |
