= 2002 CMT Flameworthy Awards =

Annual US country music awards ceremony

- Date: June 12, 2002
- Location: Nashville, Tennessee
- Hosted by: Kathy Najimy

Highlights
- Most wins: Kenny Chesney (2)
- Most nominations: Toby Keith (4)

Television/radio coverage
- Network: CMT

The inaugural 2002 CMT Flameworthy Awards (now known as the CMT Music Awards) took place on Wednesday, June 12, 2002, from the Gaylord Entertainment Center (now known as Bridgestone Arena) in downtown Nashville, Tennessee, and hosted by Kathy Najimy. The CMT Flameworthy Awards were a fan-voted awards show for country music videos and television performance.

== Background ==
The network, CMT, decided to rework their dated TNN/CMT Country Weekly Music Awards in to a new Award show, styled similarly to the MTV Video Music Awards. CMT asked fans to vote for what music videos they deem "Flameworthy" for the launch of country music's first ever video music awards. CMT stated "Flameworthy recognizes music videos' unique ability to make a lasting impact -- viewers hear it, see it, feel it, love it -- and it becomes flameworthy".

== Winners and nominees ==
Winners are shown in bold.(nominees styled with "Flameworthy" before each title)

Video of the Year	Female Video of the Year
**Kenny Chesney** — "**Young**"; Brooks & Dunn — "Only in America"; Willie Nelson and Lee Ann Womack — "Mendocino County Line"; Travis Tritt — "Modern Day Bonnie and Clyde"; Toby Keith —"I Wanna Talk About Me"	**Martina McBride** — "**Blessed**"; Sara Evans —"Saints & Angels"; Jo Dee Messina —"Bring on the Rain"; Faith Hill —"There You'll Be"; Dolly Parton —"Shine"
Male Video of the Year	Group/Duo Video of the Year
**Kenny Chesney** — "**Young**"; Trace Adkins — "I'm Tryin'"; Toby Keith —"I Wanna Talk About Me"; Tim McGraw — "The Cowboy in Me"; Alan Jackson — "Where Were You (When the World Stopped Turning)"	**Brooks & Dunn** — "**Only in America**"; Montgomery Gentry — "Cold One Comin' On"; Alison Krauss & Union Station — "The Lucky One"; Nickel Creek — "The Lighthouse's Tale"; Lonestar — "I'm Already There"
Breakthrough Video of the Year	Video Collaboration of the Year
**Chris Cagle** — "**I Breathe In, I Breathe Out**"; Cyndi Thomson — "What I Really Meant to Say"; Carolyn Dawn Johnson — "Complicated"; Keith Urban — "Where the Blacktop Ends"; Rascal Flatts — "I'm Movin' On"	**Willie Nelson** and **Lee Ann Womack** — "**Mendocino County Line**"; Clint Black and Lisa Hartman Black — "Easy for Me to Say"; Earl Scruggs and Friends — "Foggy Mountain Breakdown"; Garth Brooks and Trisha Yearwood — "Squeeze Me In"; Trisha Yearwood and Don Henley — "Inside Out"
Concept Video of the Year	Hottest Video of the Year
**Brad Paisley** — "**I'm Gonna Miss Her**"; Toby Keith — "My List"; Travis Tritt — "Modern Day Bonnie and Clyde"; Montgomery Gentry — "Cold One Comin' On"; Darryl Worley — "I Miss My Friend"	**Tim McGraw** — "**The Cowboy in Me**"; Chris Cagle — "I Breathe In, I Breathe Out"; Jamie O'Neal — "When I Think About Angels"; Alison Krauss & Union Station — "Let Me Touch You for Awhile"; Cyndi Thomson — "I Always Liked That Best"
"lol" (laugh out loud) Video of the Year	Love Your Country Video of the Year
**Toby Keith** —"**I Wanna Talk About Me**"; Alan Jackson — "It's Alright to Be a Redneck"; Martina McBride — "When God-Fearin' Women Get the Blues"; Cledus T. Judd — "Breath"; Brad Paisley — "I'm Gonna Miss Her"	**Alan Jackson** — "**Where Were You (When the World Stopped Turning)**"; David Ball — "Riding With Private Malone"; Aaron Tippin — "Where the Stars and Stripes and the Eagle Fly"; Brooks & Dunn — "Only in America"; Hank Williams Jr. — "America Will Survive"
Fashion Plate Video of the Year	Video Director of the Year
**Chely Wright** — "**Jezebel**"; Gary Allan —"Man of Me"; Keith Urban — "Where the Blacktop Ends"; Faith Hill —"There You'll Be"; Martina McBride — "Blessed"	**Deaton Flanigen** — "**Blessed**," **Martina McBride**; Michael Salomon — "I Wanna Talk About Me," Toby Keith; Steven Goldmann — "I'm Tryin'," Trace Adkins; Mark Seliger — "Mendocino County Line," Willie Nelson and Lee Ann Womack; Michael Merriman — "Modern Day Bonnie and Clyde," Travis Tritt

== Performances ==
Performer(s)	Song(s)
Alan Jackson	"Work in Progress"
Martina McBride	"Where Would You Be"
Kenny Chesney	"Young"
Sara Evans	"I Keep Looking"
Brooks & Dunn	"Only in America"
Brooks & Dunn and ZZ Top	"Tush"
Alison Krauss and Union Station and Jerry Douglas	"The Lucky One"
Keith Urban and Jason Carter	"Where the Blacktop Ends""
Earl Scruggs and Friends	"Foggy Mountain Breakdown"
Toby Keith	"Courtesy of the Red, White and Blue (The Angry American)"
Travis Tritt	"It's a Great Day to Be Alive"

== Presenters ==
- Glen Campbell, introduced Alan Jackson and lit the flame of the awards
- Peggy Hill (voiced by Kathy Najimy), started off Najimy's monologue
- Gary Allan and Chris Cagle, presented Group/Duo Video of the Year
- Trace Adkins and Mini Me, presented Concept Video of the Year
- Rascal Flatts, presented Video Director of the Year
- Montgomery Gentry and Ali Landry, presented Breakthrough Video of the Year
- Ed DeGeorge and Cyndi Thomson, presented Fashion Plate Video of the Year
- Jamie O'Neal and Carolyn Dawn Johnson, presented Male Video of the Year
- Billy Campbell, presented Video Visionary Award to The Chicks
- Carrot Top, presented Laugh Out Loud Video of the Year
- Kenny Chesney, presented Female Video of the Year
- Cletus T. Judd and Chely Wright, presented Hottest Video of the Year
- Travis Tritt, presented Love Your Country Video of the year, memorialized Waylon Jennings and the September 11 Attacks
- Glen Campbell, presented Video of the Year
