= Everlasting Tour =

2014–15 concert tour by Martina McBride

- Tour by Martina McBride
- Promotional poster for the tour
- Associated album: Everlasting
- Start date: May 8, 2014
- End date: October 2, 2015
- Legs: 2
- No. of shows: 113 in North America

Martina McBride concert chronology
- One Night Tour (2011–12); Everlasting Tour (2014–15); Love Unleashed Tour (2016–17)

The Everlasting Tour is the seventh headlining concert tour by American recording artist, Martina McBride. The tour supports the singer's twelfth studio album, Everlasting (2014). The tour mainly visited North America, playing over 100 shows in the United States and Canada.

== Setlist ==
The following setlist was obtained from the concert held on February 12, 2015, at the Adler Theatre in Davenport, Iowa. It does not represent all concerts for the duration of the tour.

1. "When God-Fearin' Women Get the Blues"
2. "Wild Angels"
3. "Wild Night"
4. "Suspicious Minds"
5. "Valentine"
6. "Blessed"
7. "I'm Gonna Love You Through It"
8. "My Babe"
9. "Perfect"
10. "In My Daughter's Eyes"
11. "Little Bit of Rain"
12. "Anyway"
13. "Come See About Me
14. "In The Basement"
15. "Bring It On Home to Me"
16. "Whatever You Say" / "Where Would You Be"
17. "Love's the Only House"
18. "A Broken Wing"
19. "What Becomes of the Brokenhearted"

Encore

20. "Son of a Preacher Man"
21. "Baby What You Want Me to Do"
22. "This One's For The Girls"
23. "Independence Day"

== Tour dates ==
Date	City	Country	Venue
North America
May 8, 2014	Salina	United States	Stiefel Theatre
May 9, 2014	Effingham	United States	Effingham Performance Center
May 10, 2014	Clear Lake	United States	Surf Ballroom
June 13, 2014	Greenville	United States	Peace Concert Hall
June 14, 2014	Huntsville	United States	Smith Concert Hall
June 20, 2014	Rama	Canada	Casino Rama Entertainment Centre
June 21, 2014	Windsor	Canada	The Colosseum at Caesars Windsor
July 3, 2014^{[A]}	Park City	United States	Snow Park Outdoor Amphitheater
July 4, 2014^{[B]}	Greeley	United States	Island Grove Stampede Arena
July 5, 2014^{[C]}	Idaho Falls	United States	Sandy Downs Grandstand
July 11, 2014	Cohasset	United States	South Shore Music Circus
July 12, 2014	Hyannis	United States	Cape Cod Melody Tent
July 17, 2014	Montgomery	United States	Montgomery Performing Arts Centre
July 18, 2014^{[D]}	Kingsport	United States	Johnson Stadium
July 19, 2014	Portsmouth	United States	nTelos Pavilion
August 15, 2014	North Myrtle Beach	United States	Alabama Theatre
August 16, 2014^{[E]}	Washington, D.C.	United States	Nationals Park
August 22, 2014	Niagara Falls	United States	Seneca Niagara Events Center
August 28, 2014	Meridian	United States	Riley Center
August 29, 2014	Forrest City	United States	EACC Fine Arts Center
August 30, 2014	Lake Charles	United States	L'Auberge Event Center
August 31, 2014	Nashville	United States	3rd and Lindsley
September 5, 2014	Carmel	United States	The Palladium
September 6, 2014	Wabash	United States	Ford Theater
September 11, 2014	Deadwood	United States	Deadwood Mountain Grand Event Center
September 12, 2014	Mahnomen	United States	Shooting Star Casino Event Center
September 13, 2014	Waukegan	United States	Genesee Theatre
September 18, 2014	Saratoga	United States	Mountain Winery Amphitheatre
September 19, 2014^{[F]}	Lincoln	United States	Thunder Valley Outdoor Amphitheater
September 20, 2014^{[G]}	Pomona	United States	Budweiser Grandstand
September 22, 2014	San Diego	United States	House of Blues
September 25, 2014	Midland	United States	Wagner Noël Performing Arts Center
September 26, 2014	Durant	United States	Choctaw Grand Theater
September 27, 2014	San Antonio	United States	Majestic Theatre
October 3, 2014	Dartmouth	Canada	Dartmouth Sportsplex
October 3, 2014	Moncton	Canada	Molson Canadian Centre
October 4, 2014	St. John's	Canada	Mile One Centre
October 9, 2014	Jericho	United States	NYCB Theatre
October 10, 2014	Albany	United States	Palace Theatre
October 11, 2014	Waterbury	United States	Palace Theater
October 16, 2014	Sarasota	United States	Van Wezel Performing Arts Hall
October 17, 2014	Melbourne	United States	King Center for the Performing Arts
October 18, 2014^{[H]}	Niceville	United States	Twin Oaks Park
October 24, 2014	Athens	United States	Classic Center Theatre
November 1, 2014	Nashville	United States	Ryman Auditorium
November 7, 2014	Dearborn	United States	Guido Theater
November 8, 2014	Dayton	United States	Mead Theatre
November 13, 2014	Jim Thorpe	United States	Penn's Peak
November 14, 2014	Utica	United States	Stanley Center for the Arts
November 15, 2014	Lynn	United States	Lynn Memorial Auditorium
November 21, 2014	Brookings	United States	Swiftel Center Arena
November 29, 2014	Kansas City	United States	Arvest Bank Theatre
November 30, 2014	Branson	United States	Moon River Theatre
December 3, 2014	Glenside	United States	Keswick Theatre
December 4, 2014	Northfield	United States	Hard Rock Live
December 5, 2014	Red Bank	United States	Count Basie Theatre
December 11, 2014	Milwaukee	United States	Northern Lights Theater
December 12, 2014	Milwaukee	United States	Northern Lights Theater
December 13, 2014	Omaha	United States	Orpheum Theatre
December 14, 2014	Bemidji	United States	Sanford Center
January 16, 2015	Cumberland	United States	Cobb Energy Performing Arts Centre
January 17, 2015	Athens	United States	Classic Center Theater
January 24, 2015	Clearwater	United States	Ruth Eckerd Hall
January 25, 2015	Naples	United States	Hayes Hall
February 10, 2015	Midwest City	United States	Hudiburg Chevrolet Center
February 12, 2015	Davenport	United States	Adler Theatre
February 13, 2015	Brookings	United States	Swiftel Center Arena
February 26, 2015	Coachella	United States	Spotlight Showroom
March 26, 2015^{[I]}	Austin	United States	Luedecke Arena
March 27, 2015	Biloxi	United States	Beau Rivage Theatre
March 28, 2015	Fort Worth	United States	Billy Bob's Texas
May 15, 2015	Merillville	United States	Star Plaza Theatre
May 16, 2015	Wisconsin Dells	United States	Crystal Grand Music Theatre
June 6, 2015^{[J]}	Chattanooga	United States	21st Century Waterfront Park
June 18, 2015^{[K]}	Burlington	United States	Miller Time Outdoor Stage
June 19, 2015	Prior Lake	United States	Mystic Lake Showroom
June 26, 2015	Enid	United States	Central National Bank Center
June 28, 2015^{[L]}	Milwaukee	United States	Briggs & Stratton Big Backyard
July 3, 2015	Myrtle Beach	United States	Alabama Theatre
July 4, 2015^{[M]}	Nashville	United States	Jack Daniel's Main stage
July 11, 2015	Rohnert Park	United States	Weill Hall
July 12, 2015	Visalia	United States	Fox Theatre
July 14, 2015^{[N]}	Turlock	United States	Bud Light Variety Free Stage
July 15, 2015^{[O]}	Sacramento	United States	Golden 1 Stage
July 16, 2015^{[P]}	Santa Maria	United States	KCOY Main stage
July 18, 2015	West Wendover	United States	Peppermill Concert Hall
July 22, 2015^{[Q]}	Helena	United States	Lewis and Clark Fairgrounds
July 24, 2015	Calgary	Canada	Grey Eagle Event Centre
July 25, 2015^{[R]}	Medicine Hat	Canada	MHE&S Grandstand
July 26, 2015^{[S]}	West Kelowna	Canada	Mission Hill Family Estate Amphitheatre
July 28, 2015^{[T]}	Rock Springs	United States	Sweetwater Events Complex
July 30, 2015^{[U]}	Redmond	United States	Bank of the Cascades Center
July 31, 2015	Manson	United States	Mill Bay Deep Water Amphitheater
August 1, 2015	Tacoma	United States	I-5 Tacoma Showroom
August 5, 2015^{[V]}	Roseburg	United States	Cascade Community Credit Union Amphitheater
August 8, 2015^{[W]}	Mansfield	United States	Richland County Fairgrounds
August 9, 2015^{[X]}	Billings	United States	Rimrock Auto Arena
August 12, 2015	Deadwood	United States	Deadwood Mountain Grand Event Center
August 13, 2015^{[Y]}	Aberdeen	United States	Brown County Fair Grandstand
September 3, 2015^{[Z]}	Anniston	United States	Anniston Performing Arts Center
September 4, 2015^{[AA]}	Memphis	United States	Memphis Botanic Garden
September 6, 2015^{[AB]}	Panama City	United States	Frank Brown Park
September 10, 2015	Detroit	United States	Fox Theatre
September 11, 2015	Rockford	United States	BMO Harris Bank Center
September 12, 2015	Lawrenceburg	United States	Lawrenceburg Event Center
September 15, 2015	Nashville	United States	Grand Ole Opry House
September 17, 2015	Morristown	United States	Mayo Performing Arts Center
September 18, 2015	Punxsutawney	United States	Punxsutawney Area Community Center
September 19, 2015	Jackson	United States	Potter Center
September 20, 2015	Reading	United States	Santander Performing Arts Center
September 25, 2015^{[AC]}	Durham	United States	Durham Fair Main stage
September 26, 2015	Concord	United States	Chubb Theatre
October 2, 2015^{[AD]}	Minot	United States	All Seasons Arena

Festivals and other miscellaneous performances

^{A} This concert was a part of the "St. Regis Big Stars, Bright Nights Concert Series"
^{B} This concert was a part of the "Greeley Stampede"
^{C} This concert was a part of "HawkFest"
^{D} This concert was a part of "FunFest"
^{E} This concert was a part of the "NatsLive Free Postgame Concert Series"
^{F} This concert was a part of the "Thunder Valley Summer Concert Series"
^{G} This concert was a part of the "End of Summer Concerts Series"
^{H} This concert was a part of the "Boggy Bayou Mullet Festival"
^{I} This concert was a part of "Rodeo Austin"
^{J} This concert was a part of the "Riverbend Festival"
^{K} This concert was a part of the "Burlington Steamboat Days"
^{L} This concert was a part of "Summerfest"
^{M} This concert was a part of the "Let Freedom Sing"
^{N} This concert was a part of the "Stanislaus County Fair"
^{O} This concert was a part of the "Toyota Concert Series"
^{P} This concert was a part of the "Santa Barbara County Fair"
^{Q} This concert was a part of the "Last Chance Stampede and Fair"
^{R} This concert was a part of the "Medicine Hat Stampede"
^{S} This concert was a part of the "Mission Hill Summer Concert Series"
^{T} This concert was a part of the "Sweetwater County Fair"
^{U} This concert was a part of the "Deschutes County Fair"
^{V} This concert was a part of the "Douglas County Fair"
^{W} This concert was a part of the "Richland County Fair and Rodeo"
^{X} This concert was a part of the "Montana Fair"
^{Y} This concert was a part of the "Brown County Fair"
^{Z} This concert was a part of the "Knox Concert Series"
^{AA} This concert was a part of "Live at the Garden Concert Series"
^{AB} This concert was a part of the "Gulf Coast Jam"
^{AC} This concert was a part of the "Durham Fair"
^{AD} This concert was a part of the "Norsk Høstfest"

=== Box office score data ===
Venue	City	Tickets sold / available	Gross revenue
Smith Concert Hall	Huntsville	1,175 / 1,596 (74%)	$71,068
Wagner Noël Performing Arts Center	Midland	1,747 / 1,747 (100%)	$117,535
Van Wezel Performing Arts Hall	Sarasota	1,275 / 1,689 (75%)	$81,735
King Center for the Performing Arts	Melbourne	1,283 / 1,500 (86%)	$68,537
Guido Theater	Dearborn	1,140 / 1,155 (~100%)	$71,000
Ruth Eckerd Hall	Clearwater	1,807 / 1,932 (94%)	$131,505
Santander Performing Arts Center	Reading	913 / 1,774 (51%)	$58,309
TOTAL		9,340 / 11,393 (82%)	$599,689

== Personnel ==
- Vinnie Ciesielski – trumpet
- Shelly Fairchild – backing vocals
- Greg Foresman – electric and acoustic guitars, backing vocals
- Greg Herrington – drums
- John Hinchey – trombone
- Randy Leago – baritone saxophone, harmonica
- Jim Medlin – keyboards
- Martina McBride – lead vocals, harmonica
- Wendy Moten – backing vocals
- Shandra Penix – backing vocals
- Glenn Snow – bass guitar, backing vocals
- Tyler Summer – tenor saxophone
