= Greatest Hits (Martina McBride album) =

Greatest hits album by Martina McBride
- Released: September 18, 2001
- Genre: Country
- Length: 68:35
- Label: RCA Nashville
- Producer: Various original producers Compilation and new tracks produced by Martina McBride and Paul Worley

Martina McBride chronology
Emotion (1999)	Greatest Hits (2001)	Martina (2003)

Singles from Greatest Hits
- 1. "When God-Fearin' Women Get the Blues" Released: June 25, 2001; 2. "Blessed" Released: October 22, 2001; 3. "Where Would You Be" Released: May 6, 2002; 4. "Concrete Angel" Released: November 18, 2002

Greatest Hits is the first compilation album by American country music singer Martina McBride, released on September 18, 2001, by RCA Nashville. The compilation includes hit singles and other songs.

Four new songs were recorded for the compilation, all released as singles. "When God-Fearin' Women Get the Blues" peaked at number 8, and was followed by "Blessed", "Where Would You Be", and "Concrete Angel", each of which hit the Hot Country Songs chart.

The compilation was certified 4× Platinum by the RIAA on December 12, 2018, for selling four million copies. Greatest Hits peaked at number 5 on the Billboard 200, and hit number 1 on the Top Country Albums chart.

== Content ==
Greatest Hits is a chronological collection of songs starting from McBride's second studio album The Way That I Am (1993) including the Canadian country number 1 hit "My Baby Loves Me (Just the Way That I Am)", "Life No. 9", and her signature song "Independence Day". Although not a single, "Strangers" was included due to its popularity among fans.

Two songs from her third studio album Wild Angels (1995) are included: US country number 1 hit "Wild Angels" and "Safe in the Arms of Love". Five songs from her album Evolution (1997) follow, including the US country number 1 hits "A Broken Wing" and "Wrong Again", as well as the Jim Brickman duet "Valentine", alongside "Happy Girl" and "Whatever You Say".

Three singles from her fifth studio album Emotion (1999) are also in the compilation, including the country number 1 hit "I Love You" from the Runaway Bride soundtrack. Other selections include "There You Are", and "Love's the Only House". In the liner notes, McBride and producer Paul Worley include commentary on each song.

Four new songs were recorded for the compilation, all of which were released as singles. The first, "When God-Fearin' Women Get the Blues", is a country song about a woman taking control of herself after she gets the blues. "Blessed" is next, which presents a woman musing about how she is blessed in many ways. "Where Would You Be" has McBride asking her man where would he be if he was not with her. The final new song "Concrete Angel" speaks about child abuse.

== Commercial performance ==
Greatest Hits debuted at number 5 on the Billboard 200 on October 13, 2001, selling 102,000 copies in its first week. It simultaneously debuted at number 1 on the Top Country Albums chart.

== Track listing ==
No.	Title	Writer(s)	Length
1.	"My Baby Loves Me"	Gretchen Peters	2:36
2.	"Independence Day"	Peters	3:26
3.	"Life #9"	Kostas, Tony Perez	4:03
4.	"Strangers"	Bobby Braddock	3:22
5.	"Wild Angels"	Matraca Berg, Harry Stinson, Gary Harrison	3:44
6.	"Safe in the Arms of Love"	Mary Ann Kennedy, Pam Rose, Pat Bunch	3:15
7.	"Happy Girl"	Beth Nielsen Chapman, Annie Roboff	3:27
8.	"A Broken Wing"	James House, Sam Hogin, Phil Barnhart	3:36
9.	"Wrong Again"	Tommy Lee James, Cynthia Weil	3:16
10.	"Whatever You Say"	Ed Hill, Tony Martin	4:31
11.	"Valentine" (featuring Jim Brickman)	Jim Brickman, Jack Kugell	3:13
12.	"I Love You"	Keith Follesé, Adrienne Follesé, Tammy Hyler	2:54
13.	"Love's the Only House"	Buzz Cason, Tom Douglas	5:13
14.	"There You Are"	Hill, Mark D. Sanders, Bob DiPiero	3:26
15.	"When God-Fearin' Women Get the Blues Intro"	Leslie Satcher	0:52
16.	"When God-Fearin' Women Get the Blues"	Satcher	4:08
17.	"Where Would You Be"	Rick Ferrell, Rachel Proctor	4:34
18.	"Concrete Angel"	Rob Crosby, Stephanie Bentley	4:13
19.	"Blessed"	Brett James, Hillary Lindsey, Troy Verges	4:36

== Personnel ==
Personnel for tracks 15–19 only:

- Matt Chamberlain — drums on "When God-Fearing' Women Get the Blues", "Concrete Angel" and "Blessed"
- Joe Chemay — bass on "Where Would You Be"
- J. T. Corenflos — electric guitar on "Where Would You Be"
- David Davidson — violin on "Where Would You Be"
- Jerry Douglas — Dobro on "When God-Fearing' Women Get the Blues"
- Dan Dugmore — electric guitar on "Where Would You Be"
- Larry Franklin — fiddle on "When God-Fearing' Women Get the Blues"
- John Hobbs — piano and Hammond B-3 organ on "Where Would You Be"
- Dann Huff — electric guitar on "Where Would You Be"
- David Huff — programming on "Where Would You Be", "Concrete Angel" and "Blessed"
- Carolyn Dawn Johnson — background vocals on "Blessed"
- Troy Johnson — background vocals on "When God-Fearing' Women Get the Blues"
- Troy Lancaster — electric guitar on "Blessed"
- B. James Lowry — acoustic guitar on all tracks
- Steve Nathan — piano on "When God-Fearing' Women Get the Blues" and "Concrete Angel"; synthesizer on "Where Would You Be", "Concrete Angel"; Hammond B-3 organ on "Blessed"
- Martina McBride — lead vocals on all tracks; background vocals on "Blessed"
- Jerry McPherson — electric guitar on all tracks
- Pamela Sixfin — violin on "Where Would You Be"
- Dan Tyminski — background vocals on "When God-Fearing' Women Get the Blues"
- Biff Watson — acoustic guitar on "When God-Fearing' Women Get the Blues", "Concrete Angel" and "Blessed"
- Lonnie Wilson — drums on "Where Would You Be"
- Karen Winklemann — violin on "Where Would You Be"
- Glenn Worf — bass guitar on "When God-Fearing' Women Get the Blues", "Concrete Angel" and Blessed"
- Paul Worley — acoustic guitar on "Where Would You Be"
- Jonathan Yudkin — violin, viola and cello on "Where Would You Be" and "Blessed"

== Chart performance ==
=== Weekly charts ===
Weekly chart performance for Greatest Hits by Martina McBride
Chart (2001)	Peak position
US Billboard 200	5
US Top Country Albums (Billboard)	1

=== Year-end charts ===
Year-end chart performance for Greatest Hits by Martina McBride
Chart (2001)	Position
Canadian Country Albums (Nielsen SoundScan)	17
US Top Country Albums (Billboard)	21
Chart (2002)	Position
Canadian Albums (Nielsen SoundScan)	183
Canadian Country Albums (Nielsen SoundScan)	13
US Billboard 200	71
US Top Country Albums (Billboard)	10
Chart (2003)	Position
US Billboard 200	106
US Top Country Albums (Billboard)	15

=== Singles ===
Year	Single	Peak positions		Certifications
Year	Single	US Country	US	Certifications
2001	"When God-Fearin' Women Get the Blues"	8	64	
2001	"Blessed"	1	31	
2002	"Where Would You Be"	3	45	
2002	"Concrete Angel"	5	47	* RIAA: Platinum

== Certifications ==
Certifications for Greatest Hits by Martina McBride
Region	Certification	Certified units/sales
Canada (Music Canada)	Gold	50,000^{^}
United States (RIAA)	4× Platinum	4,000,000^{‡}
^{^} Shipments figures based on certification alone.^{‡} Sales+streaming figures based on certification alone.
