= Love Unleashed Tour =

2016–17 concert tour by Martina McBride

- Tour by Martina McBride
- Promotional banner for the tour
- Associated album: Reckless
- Start date: October 14, 2016
- End date: March 20, 2017
- Legs: 2
- No. of shows: 37 in North America

Martina McBride concert chronology
- Everlasting Tour (2014-15); Love Unleashed Tour (2016-17); An Evening with Martina McBride (2017-18)

The Love Unleashed Tour is the eighth headlining concert tour by American recording artist Martina McBride. Launched in support of McBride's thirteenth studio album, Reckless, the tour included nearly 40 concerts across the United States and Canada.

== Background ==
The tour was announced in August 2016, while McBride was wrapping up a summer festival outing, which seamlessly transitioned into the tour. Additionally, the singer served as the headlining act for "Band Against Cancer". The tour kicked off in October 2016 with High Valley, Hailey Whitters, and Shelly Fairchild rotating as opening acts. In December 2016, McBride announced the second leg of the tour, in collaboration with CMT's "Next Women of Country". This leg featured spring country artist Lauren Alaina, Post Monroe, and Maggie Rose. The tour concluded in March 2017.

Speaking on the tour, McBride stated:

"With so much tragedy and uncertainty in the world, our family is watching less news and spending more time listening to music, sharing stories over dinner and loving each other. I want this concert to be a place where people can share the common experience of music and how it can work its magic, as only music can."

== Opening acts ==
- Hailey Whitters (Leg 1)
- High Valley (Leg 1, select dates)
- Shelly Fairchild (Leg 1, select dates)
- Lauren Alaina (Leg 2)
- Post Monroe (Leg 2, select dates)
- Maggie Rose (Leg 2, select dates)

== Setlist ==
The following setlist was performed on February 2, 2017, at the Peabody Opera House in St. Louis, Missouri. It does not represent all concerts for the duration of the tour.

1. "Love's the Only House"
2. "My Baby Loves Me"
3. "Blessed"
4. "Valentine"
5. "Diamond"
6. "It Ain't Pretty"
7. "When God-Fearin' Women Get the Blues"
8. "Life #9"
9. "Safe in the Arms of Love
10. "I Love You"
11. "In My Daughter's Eyes"
12. "I'm Gonna Love You Through It"
13. "Anyway"
14. "Reckless"
15. "Help Me Make It Through the Night"
16. "(I Never Promised You A) Rose Garden
17. "This One's for the Girls"
18. "Wild Angels"
19. "Whatever You Say"
20. "A Broken Wing"
21. "Independence Day"

Encore

22. "All You Need Is Love"
23. "We'll Pick Up Where We Left Off"

== Tour dates ==
Date	City	Country	Venue
North America
October 14, 2016	Poplar Bluff	United States	Black River Coliseum
October 15, 2016	Lawrenceburg	United States	Lawrenceburg Event Center
October 21, 2016	Tunica Resorts	United States	Millennium Theatre
October 22, 2016	Cherokee	United States	Harrah’s Cherokee Event Center
October 26, 2016^{[A]}	Nashville	United States	Grand Ole Opry House
October 28, 2016	Huntsville	United States	Smith Concert Hall
October 29, 2016	Charenton	United States	The Pavilion at Cypress Bayou
November 11, 2016	Stamford	United States	Palace Theatre
November 12, 2016	Shippensburg	United States	Luhrs Performing Arts Center
November 13, 2016	North Bethesda	United States	The Music Center at Strathmore
November 18, 2016	Dodge City	United States	United Wireless Arena
November 19, 2016	Des Moines	United States	Hoyt Sherman Place Theater
December 1, 2016	Erie	United States	Warner Theatre
December 2, 2016	Saginaw	United States	The Theater at the Dow Event Center
December 3, 2016	Rama	Canada	Casino Rama Entertainment Centre
December 8, 2016	Fort Myers	United States	Mann Performing Arts Hall
December 9, 2016	Clearwater	United States	Ruth Eckerd Hall
December 10, 2016	Biloxi	United States	Beau Rivage Theatre
February 2, 2017	St. Louis	United States	Peabody Opera House
February 3, 2017	Chicago	United States	Chicago Theatre
February 4, 2017	Louisville	United States	Palace Theatre
February 9, 2017	Greensburg	United States	Palace Theatre
February 10, 2017	Newark	United States	Midland Theatre
February 11, 2017	Nashville	United States	Ryman Auditorium
February 16, 2017	Minneapolis	United States	State Theatre
February 23, 2017	Carmel	United States	The Palladium
February 24, 2017	Cumberland	United States	Cobb Energy Performing Arts Centre
February 25, 2017	Hamlet	United States	Cole Auditorium
March 2, 2017	Durham	United States	Durham Performing Arts Center
March 3, 2017	Glenside	United States	Keswick Theatre
March 4, 2017	Lancaster	United States	American Music Theatre
March 9, 2017	New York City	United States	PlayStation Theater
March 10, 2017	Lowell	United States	Lowell Memorial Auditorium
March 11, 2017	Wilkes-Barre	United States	F.M. Kirby Center
March 17, 2017	Ivins	United States	Tuacahn Amphitheatre
March 18, 2017	Coachella	United States	Spotlight Showroom
March 20, 2017	Friant	United States	Table Mountain Casino Event Center

Festivals and other miscellaneous performances
^{A} This concert was a part of "Band Against Cancer"

=== Box office score data ===
Venue	City	Tickets sold / Available	Gross revenue
Casino Rama Entertainment Centre	Rama	3,901 / 4,974 (78%)	$181,269
Durham Performing Arts Center	Durham	2,252 / 2,712 (83%)	$103,488
Ruth Eckerd Hall	Clearwater	1,262 / 1,500 (84%)	$88,128
