= List of awards and nominations received by Alison Krauss =

Alison Krauss awards and nominations
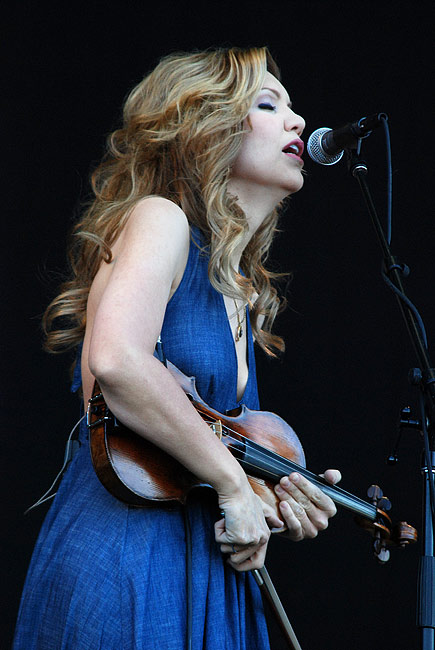
- Krauss performing at the 2008 Bonnaroo Music Festival
Awards and nominations
Award	Wins	Nominations
Grammy	27	46
ACM Awards	2	9
CCM Awards	2	2
CMA Awards	9	27
CMT Music Awards	2	5
GMA Awards	2	2
IBMA Awards	15	18
Americana Music Honors & Awards	2	3

Totals (Note: Certain award groups do not simply award one winner. They acknowledge several different recipients, have runners-up, and have third place. Since this is a specific recognition and is different from losing an award, runner-up mentions are considered wins in this award tally. For simplification and to avoid errors, each award in this list has been presumed to have had a prior nomination.)
- Wins: 61
- Nominations: 115

Alison Krauss is an American bluegrass-country singer and fiddler. She has released 16 studio albums—seven with the band Union Station and nine without them: Different Strokes (1985), Too Late to Cry (1987), Two Highways (1989), I've Got That Old Feeling (1991), Every Time You Say Goodbye (1992), I Know Who Holds Tomorrow (1994), So Long So Wrong (1997), Forget About It (1999), New Favorite (2001), Lonely Runs Both Ways (2004), Raising Sand (2007), Paper Airplane (2011), Windy City (2017), Raise The Roof (2021) and Arcadia (2025). Krauss has released five compilation albums—Now That I've Found You: A Collection (1995), Live (2002), Home on the Highways: Band Picked Favorites (2005), A Hundred Miles or More: A Collection (2007), and Essential Alison Krauss (2009)—and made other notable recordings such as the single "Whiskey Lullaby" with Brad Paisley and her several songs on the O Brother, Where Art Thou? soundtrack.

The albums Now That I've Found You and Live were certified double platinum by the Recording Industry Association of America; Forget About It and Raising Sand were certified platinum; and So Long So Wrong, New Favorite, Lonely Runs Both Ways, and the single Whiskey Lullaby were certified gold. Krauss has won 27 Grammy Awards. She has also won 15 International Bluegrass Music Association Awards, nine Country Music Association Awards, two Gospel Music Association Awards, two CMT Music Awards, two Academy of Country Music Awards, and two Canadian Country Music Awards. Country Music Television ranked Krauss 12th on their "40 Greatest Women of Country Music" list in 2002. The National Academy of Recording Arts and Sciences presented her with a special musical achievement honor in 2005. Overall, Krauss has received 61 awards from 115 nominations.

== Awards and nominations ==
=== Academy of Country Music Awards ===
The Academy of Country Music Awards have been presented annually by the Academy of Country Music since 1965. Krauss has received two awards from nine nominations.

Year	Nominee / work	Award	Result
1995	Alison Krauss	Top New Female Vocalist	Nominated
1998	"Same Old Train"	Vocal Event of the Year	Nominated
2000	"Buy Me a Rose" (with Kenny Rogers)	Vocal Event of the Year	Nominated
2003	"How's the World Treating You" (with James Taylor)	Vocal Event of the Year	Nominated
2004	"Whiskey Lullaby" (with Brad Paisley)	Vocal Event of the Year	Won
2004	"Whiskey Lullaby" (with Brad Paisley)	Video of the Year	Won
2004	"Whiskey Lullaby" (with Brad Paisley)	Single Record of the Year	Nominated
2004	"Whiskey Lullaby" (with Brad Paisley)	Song of the Year	Nominated
2004	Alison Krauss & Union Station	Top Vocal Group	Nominated

=== Americana Music Honors and Awards ===
The Americana Music Honors & Awards have been presented annually by the Americana Music Association since 2002. Krauss has received two awards from three nominations.

Year	Nominee / work	Award	Result
2008	Alison Krauss & Robert Plant	Duo/Group of the Year	Won
2008	Raising Sand (with Robert Plant)	Album of the Year	Won
2008	Gone Gone Gone (Done Moved On)	Song of the Year	Nominated

=== Canadian Country Music Awards ===
The Canadian Country Music Awards have been presented annually by the Canadian Country Music Association since 1982. Krauss has received two awards.

Year	Nominee / work	Award	Result
2001	"Get Me Through December" (with Natalie MacMaster)	Vocal/Instrumental Collaboration of the Year	Won
2023	"Do This Life" (with High Valley)	Musical Collaboration of the Year	Won

=== Country Music Association Awards ===
The Country Music Association Awards have been presented annually by the Country Music Association since 1967, and are usually presented at the Grand Ole Opry. Krauss has received 8 awards from 26 nominations.

Year	Nominee / work	Award	Result
1995	Alison Krauss	Female Vocalist of the Year	Won
1995	Alison Krauss	Horizon Award	Won
1995	"Somewhere in the Vicinity of the Heart" (with Shenandoah)	Vocal Event of the Year	Won
1995	"When You Say Nothing At All"	Single of the Year	Won
1999	"Same Old Train"	Vocal Event of the Year	Nominated
2001	O Brother, Where Art Thou?	Album of the Year	Won
2001	"I'll Fly Away" (with Gillian Welch)	Vocal Event of the Year	Nominated
2001	"Didn't Leave Nobody But the Baby"	Vocal Event of the Year	Nominated
2002	New Favorite	Album of the Year	Nominated
2002	Alison Krauss	Female Vocalist of the Year	Nominated
2002	"I'll Fly Away" (with Gillian Welch)	Vocal Event of the Year	Nominated
2003	Alison Krauss	Female Vocalist of the Year	Nominated
2004	"Whiskey Lullaby" (with Brad Paisley)	Musical Event of the Year	Won
2004	"Whiskey Lullaby" (with Brad Paisley)	Music Video of the Year	Won
2004	"Whiskey Lullaby" (with Brad Paisley)	Single of the Year	Nominated
2004	"How's The World Treating You" (with James Taylor)	Musical Event of the Year	Nominated
2004	Alison Krauss	Female Vocalist of the Year	Nominated
2005	Alison Krauss	Female Vocalist of the Year	Nominated
2005	Alison Krauss & Union Station	Vocal Group of the Year	Nominated
2006	Alison Krauss & Union Station	Vocal Group of the Year	Nominated
2007	Alison Krauss	Female Vocalist of the Year	Nominated
2007	"Missing You"	Musical Event of the Year	Nominated
2007	"The Reason Why"	Musical Event of the Year	Nominated
2007	Alison Krauss & Union Station	Vocal Group of the Year	Nominated
2008	"Gone, Gone, Gone (Done Moved On)" (with Robert Plant)	Musical Event of the Year	Won
2008	Alison Krauss	Female Vocalist of the Year	Nominated

=== CMT Music Awards ===
The CMT Music Awards are a fan-voted awards show for country music videos and television performances broadcast on and awarded by Country Music Television since 2002. Krauss has received two awards from four nominations.

Year	Nominee / work	Award	Result
2005	"Whiskey Lullaby"	Collaborative Video of the Year	Won
2005	"Whiskey Lullaby"	Video of the Year	Nominated
2008	"Gone Gone Gone (Done Moved On)" (with Robert Plant)	Wide Open County Video of the Year	Won
2009	"Please Read the Letter" (with Robert Plant)	Wide Open County Video of the Year	Nominated
2009	"Gone Gone Gone (Done Moved On)"	CMT Performance of the Year	Nominated

=== Gospel Music Association Dove Awards ===
The Gospel Music Association Dove Awards were created in 1969 by the Gospel Music Association to honor the outstanding achievements in Christian music. Krauss has received two awards.

Year	Nominee / work	Award	Result
1998	"Living Prayer"	Bluegrass Recorded Song of the Year	Won
2006	"Children of the Living God"	Bluegrass Recorded Song of the Year	Won

=== Grammy Awards ===
The Grammy Awards are awarded annually by the National Academy of Recording Arts and Sciences of the United States. As of the 2015 Grammy Awards, Krauss has received 27 awards from 46 nominations. Those 27 wins make her the most awarded singer until Beyonce surpassed the record in 2021, the second most awarded female artist, and tied for the fourth most awarded artist overall in Grammy history. At the time of her first award, at the 1991 Grammy Awards, she was the second youngest winner ever (currently tied as ninth youngest).

Year	Nominee / work	Award	Result
1990	Two Highways	Best Bluegrass Recording	Nominated
1991	I've Got That Old Feeling	Best Bluegrass Recording	Won
1993	Every Time You Say Goodbye	Best Bluegrass Album	Won
1995	"When You Say Nothing At All"	Best Country Performance by a Duo or Group with Vocal	Nominated
1995	"Teach Your Children"	Best Country Vocal Collaboration	Nominated
1995	I Know Who Holds Tomorrow	Best Southern Gospel, Country Gospel or Bluegrass Gospel Album	Won
1996	"Baby, Now That I've Found You"	Best Female Country Vocal Performance	Won
1996	"Somewhere in the Vicinity of the Heart"	Best Country Collaboration with Vocals	Won
1997	"Baby Mine"	Best Female Country Vocal Performance	Nominated
1997	"High Lonesome Sound"	Best Country Collaboration with Vocals	Won
1998	"Looking in the Eyes of Love"	Best Country Performance by a Duo or Group with Vocal	Won
1998	"Little Liza Jane"	Best Country Instrumental Performance	Won
1998	So Long So Wrong	Best Bluegrass Album	Won
1999	"Same Old Train"	Best Country Collaboration with Vocals	Won
2000	"Forget About It"	Best Female Country Vocal Performance	Nominated
2000	Forget About It	Best Country Album	Nominated
2002	O Brother, Where Art Thou?	Album of the Year	Won
2002	New Favorite	Best Bluegrass Album	Won
2002	"The Lucky One"	Best Country Performance by a Duo or Group with Vocal	Won
2002	"Choctaw Hayride"	Best Country Instrumental Performance	Nominated
2002	"Didn't Leave Nobody But The Baby"	Best Country Collaboration with Vocals	Nominated
2003	"Can the Circle Be Unbroken (By and By)"	Best Country Collaboration with Vocals	Nominated
2003	This Side	Best Contemporary Folk Album	Won
2004	"How's The World Treating You" (with James Taylor)	Best Country Collaboration with Vocals	Won
2004	"Cluck Old Hen"	Best Country Instrumental Performance	Won
2004	Live	Best Bluegrass Album	Won
2005	"You Will Be My Ain True Love"	Best Female Country Vocal Performance	Nominated
2005	"Coat of Many Colors" (with Shania Twain)	Best Country Collaboration with Vocals	Nominated
2006	"Restless"	Best Country Performance by a Duo or Group with Vocal	Won
2006	"Unionhouse Branch"	Best Country Instrumental Performance	Won
2006	Lonely Runs Both Ways	Best Country Album	Won
2008	"Gone Gone Gone (Done Moved On)" (with Robert Plant)	Best Pop Collaboration with Vocals	Won
2008	"Simple Love"	Best Female Country Vocal Performance	Nominated
2008	These Days (as featured artist)	Album Of The Year	Nominated
2009	Raising Sand (with Robert Plant and T-Bone Burnett)	Album of the Year	Won
2009	Raising Sand (with Robert Plant and T-Bone Burnett)	Best Contemporary Folk/Americana Album	Won
2009	"Please Read the Letter" (with Robert Plant)	Record of the Year	Won
2009	"Rich Woman" (with Robert Plant)	Best Pop Collaboration with Vocals	Won
2009	"Killing the Blues" (with Robert Plant)	Best Country Collaboration with Vocals	Won
2012	Paper Airplane	Best Bluegrass Album	Won
2013	"I Just Come Here For The Music" (with Don Williams)	Best Country Duo/Group Performance	Nominated
2015	"And When I Die" (with Billy Childs & Jerry Douglas)	Best American Roots Performance	Nominated
2018	"Losing You"	Best Country Solo Performance	Nominated
2018	"I Never Cared For You"	Best American Roots Performance	Nominated
2023	"Going Where the Lonely Go" (with Robert Plant)	Best Country Duo/Group Performance	Nominated
2023	Raise the Roof (with Robert Plant)	Best Americana Album	Nominated
2026	"Richmond on the James"	Best American Roots Performance	Nominated
2026	Arcadia	Best Bluegrass Album	Nominated

=== International Bluegrass Music Association Awards ===
Founded in 1985, the International Bluegrass Music Association Awards are awarded annually by the International Bluegrass Music Association. As of 2025, Krauss has received 15 awards, including two wins of the top honor: Entertainer of the Year and 5 Female Vocalist of the Year wins.

In 2021, she was inducted into the association's International Bluegrass Music Hall of Fame.

Year	Nominee / work	Award	Result
1990	Alison Krauss	Female Vocalist of the Year	Won
1991	Alison Krauss	Female Vocalist of the Year	Won
1991	Alison Krauss & Union Station	Entertainer of the Year	Won
1991	I've Got That Old Feeling	Album of the Year	Won
1993	Alison Krauss	Female Vocalist of the Year	Won
1993	Everytime You Say Goodbye	Album of the Year	Won
1995	Alison Krauss	Female Vocalist of the Year	Won
1995	Alison Krauss & Union Station	Entertainer of the Year	Won
1997	"High Lonesome Sound"	Song of the Year	Won
2001	O Brother, Where Art Thou?	Album of the Year	Won
2001	"I'll Fly Away"	Gospel Recorded Performance of the Year	Won
2002	Down from the Mountain	Album of the Year	Won
2003	Live	Album of the Year	Won
2004	Livin', Lovin', Losin': Songs of the Louvin Brothers	Recorded Event of the Year	Won
2025	Alison Krauss	Female Vocalist of the Year	Won
