= List of Top Country Albums number ones of 2001 =

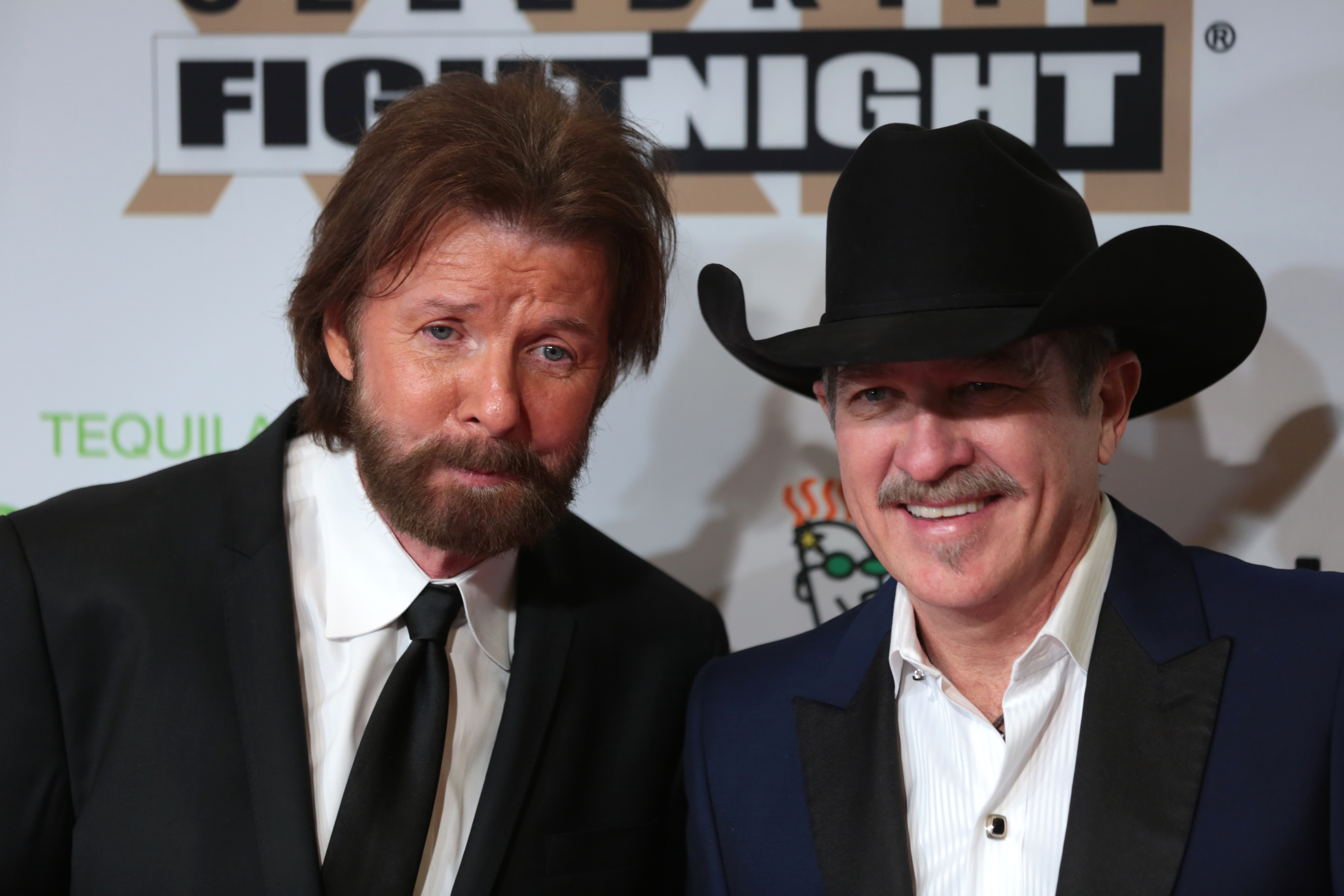
Brooks & Dunn topped the chart in 2001 with Steers & Stripes.

Top Country Albums is a chart that ranks the top-performing country music albums in the United States, published by Billboard. In 2001, 13 different albums topped the chart, based on electronic point of sale data provided by SoundScan Inc.

In the issue of Billboard dated January 6, Tim McGraw was at number one with his album Greatest Hits, its fifth week in the top spot. It spent the first five weeks of 2001 atop the listing before being displaced by the soundtrack album of the film Coyote Ugly. McGraw returned to the top spot in May with Set This Circus Down and was the only act with two number ones during the year. Two other greatest hits albums reached number one in 2001. In October, Martina McBride reached number one with her album simply entitled Greatest Hits; it was her first album to top the chart. The following month, Reba McEntire, one of the most successful female singers in country music history, reached the peak position with her third such release, Greatest Hits Volume III: I'm a Survivor. In addition to McBride, the band Lonestar reached number one for the first time in 2001, spending a single week in the top spot in July with I'm Already There, and Toby Keith achieved the same feat two months later with Pull My Chain.

In February, the soundtrack album of the film O Brother, Where Art Thou? reached number one; by the end of the year it had spent 24 weeks in the top spot in six different spells. The soundtrack, curated and produced by T Bone Burnett, used bluegrass and folk music styles appropriate to the film's Great Depression-era setting and unexpectedly became a great success. It would go on to spend a total of 35 weeks atop the country albums chart and reach number one on the all-genre Billboard 200 early in 2002, shortly after it won the Grammy Award for Album of the Year. The year's final chart-topper was Scarecrow by Garth Brooks, which entered the chart at number one in the issue of Billboard dated December 1, and was atop the listing for the final five weeks of the year. It was the 11th chart-topper since 1990 for one of the most successful recording artists in history.

== Chart history ==
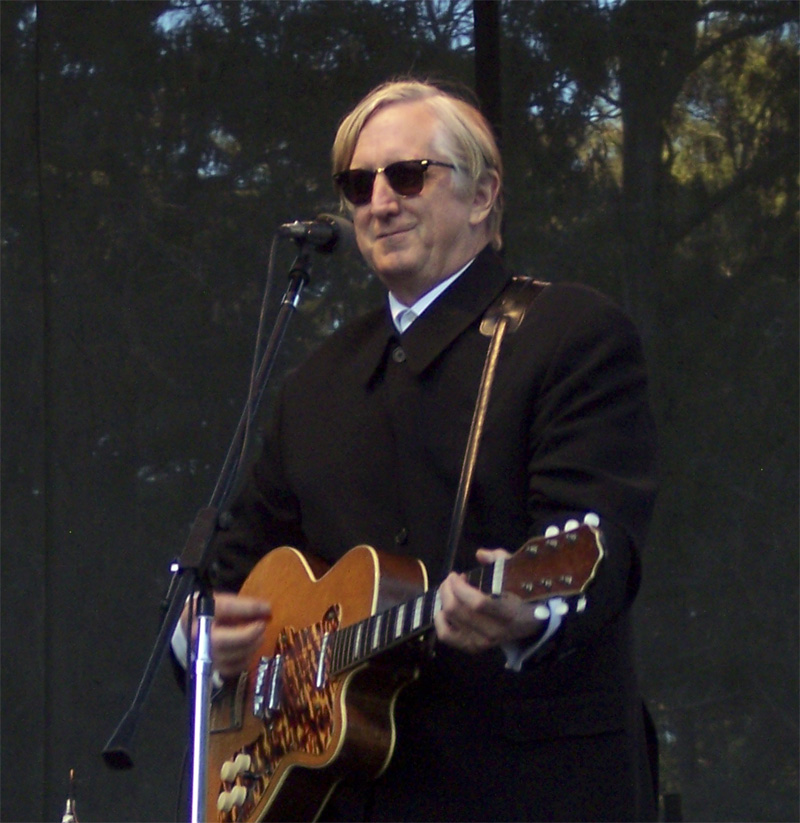
T Bone Burnett curated and produced the soundtrack album for the film O Brother, Where Art Thou?.

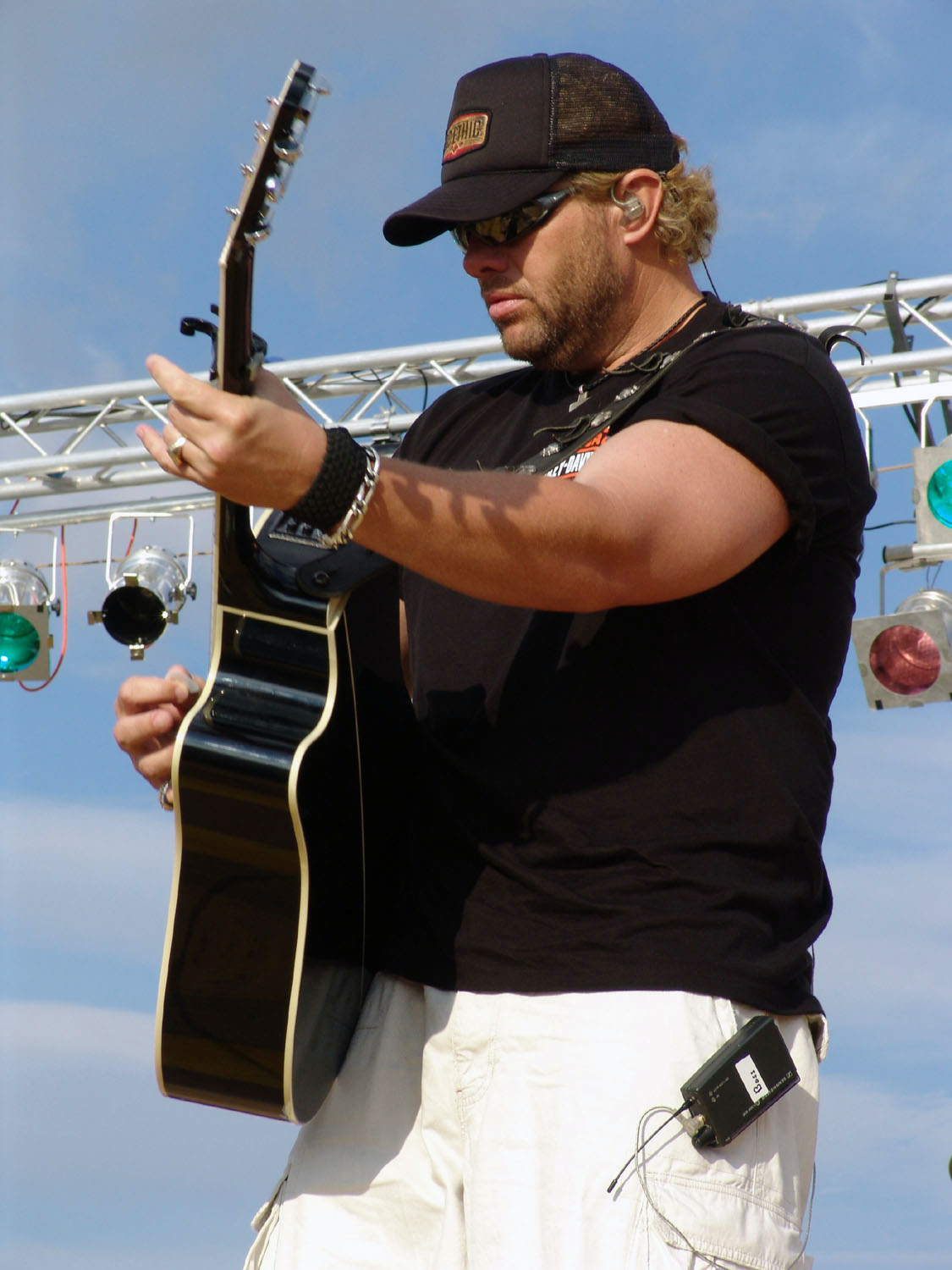
Pull My Chain was the first number one for Toby Keith.

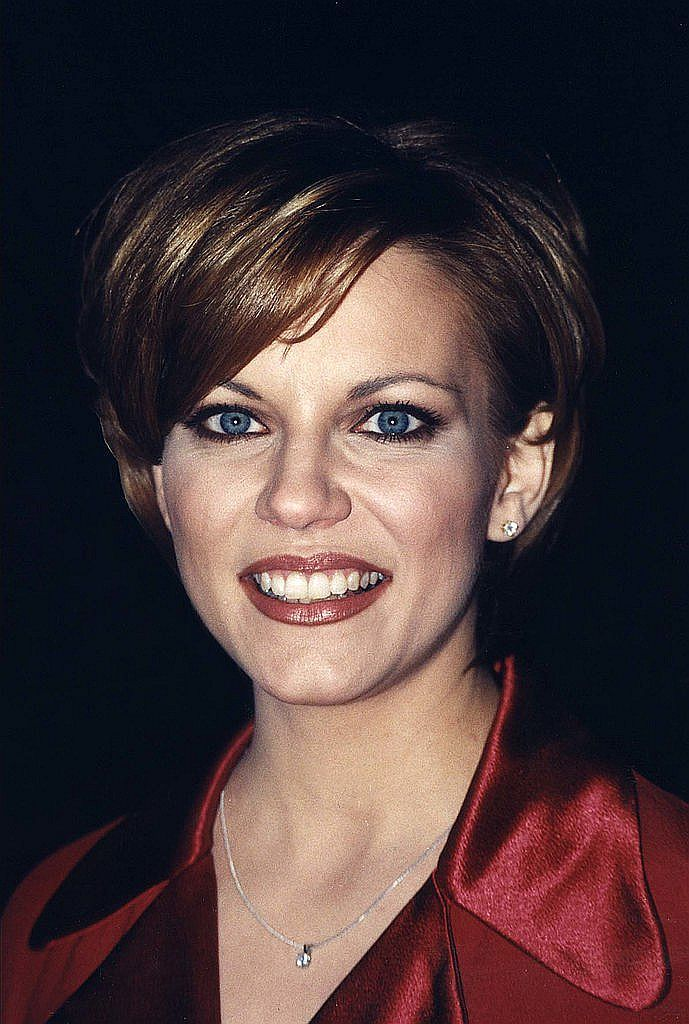
Martina McBride topped the chart with her album Greatest Hits.

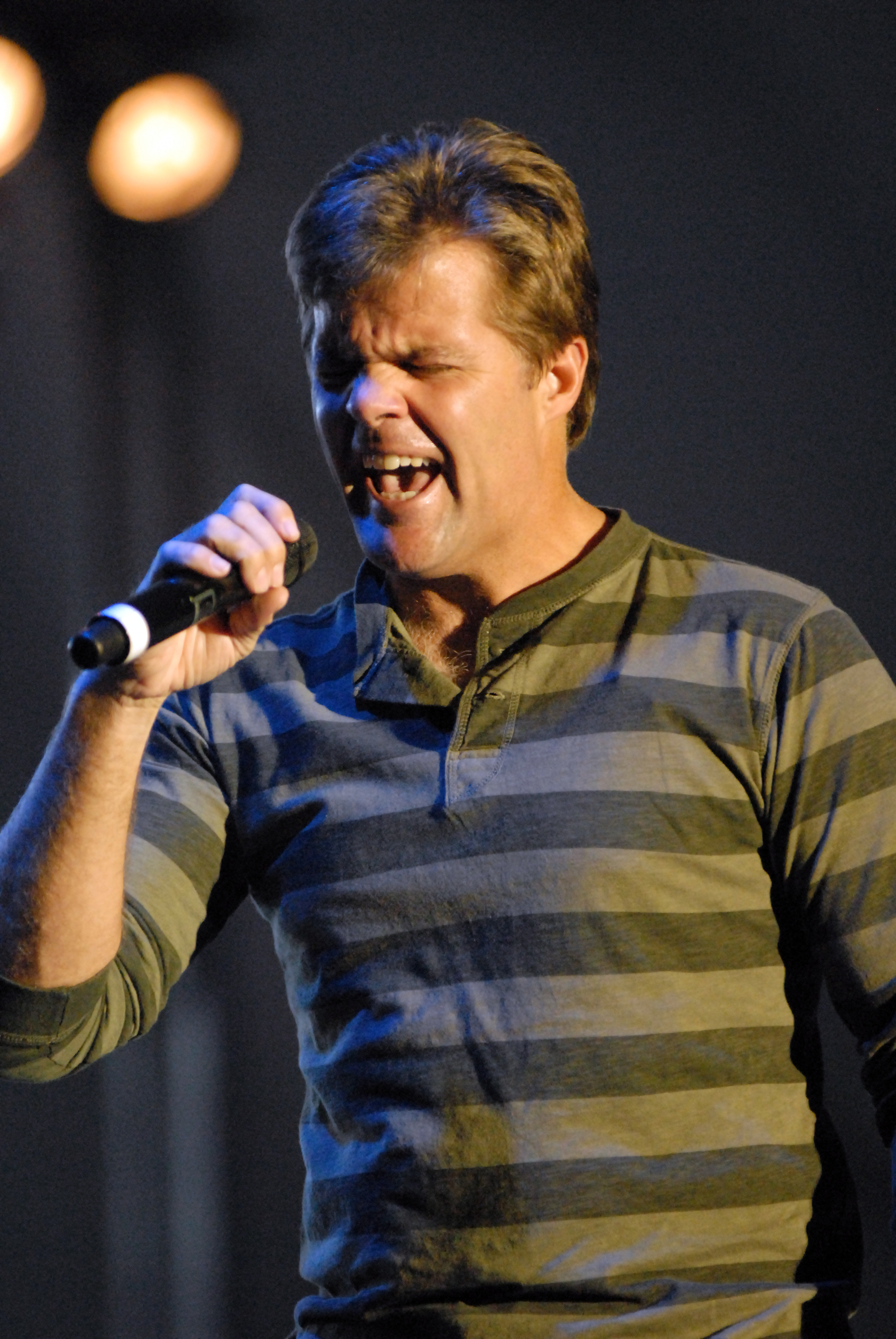
The band Lonestar (lead singer Richie McDonald pictured) reached number one for the first time with I'm Already There.

Issue date	Title	Artist(s)	Ref.
January 6	Greatest Hits	Tim McGraw	
January 13	Greatest Hits	Tim McGraw	
January 20	Greatest Hits	Tim McGraw	
January 27	Greatest Hits	Tim McGraw	
February 3	Greatest Hits	Tim McGraw	
February 10	Coyote Ugly	Soundtrack	
February 17	I Need You	LeAnn Rimes	
February 24	O Brother, Where Art Thou?	Soundtrack	
March 3	O Brother, Where Art Thou?	Soundtrack	
March 10	O Brother, Where Art Thou?	Soundtrack	
March 17	O Brother, Where Art Thou?	Soundtrack	
March 24	O Brother, Where Art Thou?	Soundtrack	
March 31	O Brother, Where Art Thou?	Soundtrack	
April 7	O Brother, Where Art Thou?	Soundtrack	
April 14	O Brother, Where Art Thou?	Soundtrack	
April 21	O Brother, Where Art Thou?	Soundtrack	
April 28	Coyote Ugly	Soundtrack	
May 5	Steers & Stripes	Brooks & Dunn	
May 12	Set This Circus Down	Tim McGraw	
May 19	Set This Circus Down	Tim McGraw	
May 26	Set This Circus Down	Tim McGraw	
June 2	Set This Circus Down	Tim McGraw	
June 9	Set This Circus Down	Tim McGraw	
June 16	Set This Circus Down	Tim McGraw	
June 23	Inside Out	Trisha Yearwood	
June 30	O Brother, Where Art Thou?	Soundtrack	
July 7	O Brother, Where Art Thou?	Soundtrack	
July 14	I'm Already There	Lonestar	
July 21	O Brother, Where Art Thou?	Soundtrack	
July 28	O Brother, Where Art Thou?	Soundtrack	
August 4	O Brother, Where Art Thou?	Soundtrack	
August 11	O Brother, Where Art Thou?	Soundtrack	
August 18	O Brother, Where Art Thou?	Soundtrack	
August 25	O Brother, Where Art Thou?	Soundtrack	
September 1	O Brother, Where Art Thou?	Soundtrack	
September 8	O Brother, Where Art Thou?	Soundtrack	
September 15	Pull My Chain	Toby Keith	
September 22	O Brother, Where Art Thou?	Soundtrack	
September 29	O Brother, Where Art Thou?	Soundtrack	
October 6	Greatest Hits	Martina McBride	
October 13	Greatest Hits	Martina McBride	
October 20	Greatest Hits	Martina McBride	
October 27	O Brother, Where Art Thou?	Soundtrack	
November 3	O Brother, Where Art Thou?	Soundtrack	
November 10	Greatest Hits Volume III: I'm a Survivor	Reba McEntire	
November 17	O Brother, Where Art Thou?	Soundtrack	
November 24	The Road Less Traveled	George Strait	
December 1	Scarecrow	Garth Brooks	
December 8	Scarecrow	Garth Brooks	
December 15	Scarecrow	Garth Brooks	
December 22	Scarecrow	Garth Brooks	
December 29	Scarecrow	Garth Brooks	
