= A Little Bit of You =

A Little Bit of You may refer to:

- "A Little Bit of You" (Lee Roy Parnell song), 1995
- "A Little Bit of You" (Jason McCoy song), 1998
- "Little Bit of You", a 2015 song by Chase Bryant
