= I'm Gone =

I'm Gone may refer to:

- I'm Off, a 1999 novel by Jean Echenoz, also known as I'm Gone
- "I'm Gone" (George Fox song), 1998
- "I'm Gone" (Cyndi Thomson song), 2002
- "I'm Gone" (Jordan Pruitt song), 2008
- "I'm Gone" (Tyga song), 2012
- "I'm Gone", a song by Dolly Parton from Halos & Horns
- "I'm Gone" (Joyryde song), 2019
- "I'm Gone", a song by DJ Kay Slay from The Streetsweeper, Vol. 2
- "I'm Gone", a song by Jay Sean from All or Nothing
