= Live (Alison Krauss album) =

Live album by Alison Krauss & Union Station
- Released: November 5, 2002
- Recorded: April 29, 2002 & April 30, 2002
- Venues: The Louisville Palace, Louisville, Kentucky
- Genre: Bluegrass
- Length: 100:30
- Label: Rounder
- Producers: Alison Krauss & Union Station

Alison Krauss chronology
New Favorite (2001)	Live (2002)	Lonely Runs Both Ways (2004)

Live is the fifth album and the first live album by Alison Krauss and Union Station. All of the songs except "Down to the River to Pray" (performed at Austin City Limits) were recorded at The Louisville Palace on April 29–30, 2002. The album was released on November 5, 2002.

At the 46th Grammy Awards, Live won the Grammy Award for Best Bluegrass Album and the traditional song "Cluck Old Hen" won the Grammy Award for Best Country Instrumental Performance.

== Track listing ==
Disc one
No.	Title	Writer(s)	Length
1.	"Let Me Touch You For Awhile"	Robert Lee Castleman	3:45
2.	"Choctaw Hayride"	Jerry Douglas	3:25
3.	"The Lucky One"	Robert Lee Castleman	3:40
4.	"Baby, Now That I've Found You" (first performed by The Foundations)	Tony Macaulay, John MacLeod	5:02
5.	"Bright Sunny South"	Traditional	3:07
6.	"Every Time You Say Goodbye"	John Pennell	3:04
7.	"Tiny Broken Heart"	Charlie Louvin, Ira Louvin	3:08
8.	"Cluck Old Hen"	Traditional	2:47
9.	"Stay"	Larry Byrom, Allyson Taylor	3:16
10.	"Broadway"	Sidney Cox, Suzanne Cox	3:57
11.	"Ghost In This House"	Hugh Prestwood	4:29
12.	"Forget About It"	Robert Lee Castleman	3:18
13.	"Faraway Land"	Ron Block	3:21
Total length:			46:19

Disc two
No.	Title	Writer(s)	Length
1.	"A Tribute to Peador O'Donnell / Monkey Let the Hogs Out"	Dónal Lunny / Jerry Douglas	4:58
2.	"The Boy Who Wouldn't Hoe Corn"	Traditional	5:58
3.	"Take Me For Longing"	Mark Simos	2:47
4.	"I Am A Man Of Constant Sorrow"	Traditional	4:12
5.	"Maybe"	Gordon Kennedy, Phil Madeira	4:25
6.	"We Hide & Seek"	Douglas	5:41
7.	"But You Know I Love You"	Mike Settle	3:39
8.	"When You Say Nothing At All"	Paul Overstreet, Don Schlitz	4:21
9.	"New Favorite"	David Rawlings, Gillian Welch	4:00
10.	"Oh, Atlanta"	Mick Ralphs	6:47
11.	"Down to the River to Pray"	Traditional	2:10
12.	"There Is a Reason"	Ron Block	5:13
Total length:			54:11

== Personnel ==
- Alison Krauss - Vocals, fiddle
- Jerry Douglas - Resonator guitar, vocals
- Dan Tyminski - Guitar, mandolin, vocals
- Ron Block - Guitar, banjo, vocals
- Barry Bales - Bass, vocals
- Larry Atamanuik - Drums

== Chart performance ==
=== Weekly charts ===
Chart (2002)	Peak position
US Billboard 200	36
US Top Bluegrass Albums (Billboard)	1
US Top Country Albums (Billboard)	9

=== Year-end charts ===
Chart (2002)	Position
Canadian Country Albums (Nielsen SoundScan)	64

Chart (2003)	Position
US Billboard 200	146
US Top Country Albums (Billboard)	17

Chart (2004)	Position
US Top Country Albums (Billboard)	37

== Certifications ==
Region	Certification	Certified units/sales
Canada (Music Canada) DVD	Gold	5,000^{^}
United States (RIAA)	2× Platinum	2,000,000^{^}
United States (RIAA) DVD	Platinum	100,000^{^}
^{^} Shipments figures based on certification alone.
