= Ryan Montgomery =

Ryan Montgomery may refer to:

- Ryan Daniel Montgomery, known professionally as Royce da 5'9", American rapper, songwriter, and record producer
- Ryan Montgomery (singer), American country music artist
- Ryan Montgomery, known also as 0day, a child safety advocate and ethical hacker.
