= I'm Gone (Cyndi Thomson song) =

Single by Cyndi Thomson

from the album My World
- B-side: "Hope You're Doing Fine"
- Released: April 13, 2002
- Genre: Country
- Length: 3:49
- Label: Capitol Nashville
- Songwriter(s): Kim Richey, Chuck Prophet
- Producer(s): Paul Worley, Tommy Lee James

Cyndi Thomson singles chronology
"I Always Liked That Best" (2001)	"I'm Gone" (2002)

"I'm Gone" is a song recorded by American country music artist Cyndi Thomson. It was released in April 2002 as the third single from the album My World. The song reached #31 on the Billboard Hot Country Singles & Tracks chart. The song was written by Kim Richey and Chuck Prophet.

== Chart performance ==
Chart (2002)	Peak position
US Hot Country Songs (Billboard)	31
