= New Favorite =

Studio album by Alison Krauss & Union Station
- Released: August 14, 2001
- Genres: Bluegrass, country
- Length: 45:28
- Label: Rounder
- Producers: Alison Krauss & Union Station

Alison Krauss chronology
Forget About It (1999)	New Favorite (2001)	Live (2002)

Singles from New Favorite
- 1. "The Lucky One" Released: 2001; 2. "Let Me Touch You for a While" Released: 2002; 3. "New Favorite" Released: 2002

Professional ratings
Review scores
Source	Rating
AllMusic	link
Country Standard Time	Not rated link
Rolling Stone	favorable link

New Favorite is the fourth album by bluegrass music group Alison Krauss & Union Station, released August 14, 2001. The album peaked in the top 50 of the Billboard 200 and within the top 5 of the Billboard charts for both Country and Bluegrass and was certified gold. This album was released in the same year as the O Brother, Where Art Thou? soundtrack, which Krauss appeared on, that had a large effect on bluegrass in the United States. At the 44th Grammy Awards, New Favorite would go on to win the Grammy Award for Best Bluegrass Album and the single "The Lucky One" won the Grammy Award for Best Country Performance by a Duo or Group with Vocal as well as Best Country Song.

== Track listing ==
1. "Let Me Touch You for Awhile" (Robert Lee Castleman) – 3:21
2. "The Boy Who Wouldn't Hoe Corn" (Traditional) – 4:40
3. "The Lucky One" (Castleman) – 3:10
4. "Choctaw Hayride" (Jerry Douglas) – 3:10
5. "Crazy Faith" (Mark Simos) – 3:47
6. "Momma Cried" (Bob Lucas) – 3:20
7. "I'm Gone" (Eric Kaz, Wendy Waldman) – 3:28
8. "Daylight" (Lucas) – 4:03
9. "Bright Sunny South" (Traditional) – 3:00
10. "Stars" (Dan Fogelberg) – 2:54
11. "It All Comes Down to You" (Ron Block) – 2:44
12. "Take Me for Longing" (Simos) – 2:51
13. "New Favorite" (David Rawlings, Gillian Welch) – 4:34

== Personnel ==
- Alison Krauss – lead vocals, fiddle, viola
- Dan Tyminski – background vocals, lead vocals, acoustic guitar, mandolin
- Ron Block – background vocals, acoustic guitar, banjo
- Jerry Douglas – dobro, lap steel guitar
- Barry Bales – background vocals, upright bass
- Larry Atamanuik – drums, percussion

== Charts ==
=== Weekly charts ===
Chart (2001)	Peak position
US Billboard 200	35
US Top Bluegrass Albums (Billboard)	2
US Top Country Albums (Billboard)	3

=== Year-end charts ===
Chart (2001)	Position
Canadian Country Albums (Nielsen SoundScan)	42
Chart (2002)	Position
Canadian Country Albums (Nielsen SoundScan)	50
US Top Country Albums (Billboard)	21
Chart (2003)	Position
US Top Country Albums (Billboard)	59

== Certifications ==
Region	Certification	Certified units/sales
United States (RIAA)	Gold	500,000^{^}
^{^} Shipments figures based on certification alone.
