= My World (Cyndi Thomson album) =

Studio album by Cyndi Thomson
- Released: July 31, 2001
- Studio: The Money Pit (Nashville, TN); Loud Recording (Nashville, TN)
- Genre: Country
- Length: 35:36
- Label: Capitol Nashville
- Producer: Tommy Lee James; Paul Worley

Cyndi Thomson chronology
| My World (2001) | Acres of Diamonds (2025) |

Singles from My World
- 1. "What I Really Meant to Say" Released: March 26, 2001; 2. "I Always Liked That Best" Released: October 29, 2001; 3. "I'm Gone" Released: April 8, 2002; 4. "If You Could Only See" Released: October 14, 2002

Professional ratings
Review scores
| Source | Rating |
|---|---|
| Allmusic | 3/5 stars |

My World is the only studio album by American country music artist Cyndi Thomson, released on July 31, 2001, via Capitol Nashville. Production was provided by Tommy Lee James and Paul Worley, while Thomson co-wrote eight of the album's eleven tracks.

This album contains her single "What I Really Meant to Say", which became her only number one single on the US Hot Country Songs chart. Follow-up singles "I Always Liked That Best" and "I'm Gone" both cracked top-forty while the final single "If You Could Only See" failed to enter the chart. The album has been certified Gold by the RIAA. This is Thomson's only studio album to date, as in 2002 she announced she would quit the music industry. In 2024, Thomson returned to music with her first single in 22 years, "The Georgia in Me." Multiple singles followed, and on May 23rd, 2025, she released her first EP, Acres of Diamonds on Country Line Entertainment.

== Track listing ==
My World track listing
| No. | Title | Writer(s) | Length |
|---|---|---|---|
| 1. | "My World" | Cyndi Thomson; Tommy Lee James; Chris Waters | 3:20 |
| 2. | "I Always Liked That Best" | Thomson; James; Jennifer Kimball | 3:03 |
| 3. | "What I Really Meant to Say" | Thomson; James; Waters | 3:20 |
| 4. | "Things I Would Do" | Thomson; James; Robin Lerner | 2:54 |
| 5. | "If You Could Only See" | Thomson; James; Arnie Roman | 3:13 |
| 6. | "I'm Gone" | Kim Richey; Chuck Prophet | 3:50 |
| 7. | "If You Were Mine" | Thomson; James; Liz Hengber | 3:29 |
| 8. | "Hope You're Doing Fine" | James; Hengber | 3:21 |
| 9. | "There Goes the Boy" | Odie Blackmon; Jay Knowles | 2:34 |
| 10. | "But I Want To" | Thomson; James; James LeBlanc | 2:52 |
| 11. | "I'll Be Seeing You" | Thomson; James | 3:43 |
| Total length: | | | 35:36 |

== Personnel ==
Compiled from liner notes.

- J. T. Corenflos — electric guitar, 12-string guitar
- Dan Dugmore — steel guitar, mandolin, acoustic guitar, electric guitar, 12-string guitar, Dobro
- Stuart Duncan — fiddle
- David Huff — drum programming, percussion
- Tommy Lee James — background vocals
- Tim Lauer — accordion
- John Mock — penny whistle
- Greg Morrow — drums, percussion
- Steve Nathan — keyboards, acoustic piano, Hammond B-3 organ, Wurlitzer piano
- Alison Prestwood — bass guitar
- Randy Scruggs — banjo, mandolin, acoustic guitar
- Cyndi Thomson — lead vocals, background vocals
- Biff Watson — acoustic guitar
- Paul Worley — acoustic guitar, electric guitar, 12-string guitar, slide guitar
- Jonathan Yudkin — fiddle, violin, viola, cello

Strings performed by the Nashville String Machine and arranged by Rob Mathes.

== Charts ==
=== Weekly charts ===
| Chart (2001) | Peak position |
|---|---|
| US Billboard 200 | 81 |
| US Top Country Albums (Billboard) | 7 |

=== Year-end charts ===
| Chart (2001) | Position |
|---|---|
| Canadian Country Albums (Nielsen SoundScan) | 83 |
| US Top Country Albums (Billboard) | 50 |
| Chart (2002) | Position |
| US Top Country Albums (Billboard) | 38 |
