= Ryan Montgomery (singer) =

American country music singer

- Born: Ryan Montgomery; 1998 (age 27–28)
- Occupations: Singer; songwriter
- Years active: 1998–present
- Musical career
- Genres: Country
- Instruments: Vocals; guitar; bass; drums
- Label: Ryan Montgomery Music
- Website: ryanmontgomerymusic.net

Ryan Montgomery is an American country music artist. He was born and raised in South Florida. He has performed with Dustin Lynch, Craig Campbell, and Chase Bryant.

== Career ==
Montgomery released his debut single, "Drop a Tailgate", on June 3, 2018, and self-titled 6-song debut EP on June 29, 2018. Montgomery's 2018–19 releases landed on Apple Music's Best of the Week (All Charts), Cool Country Playlist, Hot Tracks, Spotify's Release Radar, Discover Weekly, Daily Mix and New Country 2018. Ryan released 'Til The Sun Came Up on September 6, 2019. He is currently enrolled in the BBA program at Florida Atlantic University while pursuing his music career in the country genre.

== Personal life ==
Montgomery participates in sports such as ice hockey, basketball, waterskiing, surfing and working out.

== Discography ==
=== Extended plays ===
List of extended plays
Title	Details
Ryan Montgomery	Release date: June 29, 2018; Formats: CD, Digital download; Label: Ryan Montgomery Music
We Brought the Party	Release date: January 8, 2021; Formats: Digital download, streaming; Label: Ryan Montgomery Music

=== Singles ===
Title	Year	Album
"Drop a Tailgate"	2018	Ryan Montgomery
"Buy You a Drink"	2019	Non-album single
"'Til the Sun Came Up"	2019	Non-album single
"'Buzzed at First Sight"	2020	Non-album single
"'Mexico Memories"	2020	We Brought the Party
"'Windows Down"	2020	We Brought the Party
"'Teenage Dream"	2020	We Brought the Party
"'Nashville & Hawaii"	2021	Non-album single
