= Take It On Back =

Single by Chase Bryant

from the EP Chase Bryant
- Released: July 14, 2014
- Genre: Country
- Length: 4:04
- Label: Red Bow
- Songwriter(s): Dylan Altman; Chase Bryant; Tommy Lee James
- Producer(s): Chase Bryant; Derek George

Chase Bryant singles chronology
"Take It On Back" (2014)	"Little Bit of You" (2015)

"Take It On Back" is a song recorded by American country music artist Chase Bryant. It was released in July 2014 as his debut single and the first from his self-titled EP. Bryant wrote the song with Dylan Altman and Tommy Lee James.

== Critical reception ==
Taste of Country reviewed the single favorably, saying that "Songs about summer love that couldn’t last aren’t anything new in country music. But if the theme is classic country, Bryant kicks it up a notch (or ten) with a strong rock ‘n roll feel that you won’t find on most traditional songs." Markos Papadatos of Digital Journal gave the song four stars out of five, writing that Bryant's vocals are "pleasant" and "he really knows how to shred the guitar on this tune." Papadatos added that "the production is strong, and the melodies and chorus are infectious."

== Music video ==
The music video was directed by Wes Edwards and premiered in November 2014.

== Chart performance ==
"Take It On Back" debuted at number 51 on the U.S. Billboard Country Airplay chart for the week of August 2, 2014. It also debuted at number 47 on the U.S. Billboard Hot Country Songs chart for the week of August 30, 2014. The song has sold 111,000 copies in the US as of February 2015.

Chart (2014–2015)	Peak position
Canada Country (Billboard)	19
US Billboard Hot 100	82
US Country Airplay (Billboard)	9
US Hot Country Songs (Billboard)	16

=== Year-end charts ===
Chart (2014)	Position
US Country Airplay (Billboard)	78
US Hot Country Songs (Billboard)	97

Chart (2015)	Position
US Country Airplay (Billboard)	62
US Hot Country Songs (Billboard)	73
