= Chase Bryant (EP) =

EP by Chase Bryant
- Released: September 23, 2014
- Genre: Country
- Length: 17:30
- Label: Red Bow
- Producers: Chase Bryant; Derek George

Chase Bryant chronology
Chase Yaklin (2010)	Chase Bryant (2014)	Upbringing (2021)

Singles from Chase Bryant
- 1. "Take It On Back" Released: July 14, 2014; 2. "Little Bit of You" Released: March 30, 2015

Chase Bryant is the self-titled debut EP by American country music artist Chase Bryant. It was released on September 23, 2014 via Red Bow.

== Critical reception ==
Website, The Shotgun Seat gave the album a three-star review, saying that "Consistency is key, and Chase Bryant is a solid set of five songs that work perfectly together. That being said, he’s going to need more interesting subject matters on his next release. He’s no Luke Bryan or Florida Georgia Line. Judging from Chase Bryant, though, there’s promise he can be much more than that."

== Track listing ==
No.	Title	Writer(s)	Length
1.	"Wayfarer Weather"	Chase Bryant; Michael Dulaney; Neil Thrasher	3:09
2.	"Little Bit of You"	Bryant; Derek George; Ashley Gorley	3:06
3.	"Change Your Name"	Bryant; Tommy Lee James	3:54
4.	"Jet Black Pontiac"	Cary Barlowe; Bryant; Jesse Frasure	3:17
5.	"Take It On Back"	Dylan Altman; Bryant; Lee James	4:04
Total length:			17:30

== Chart performance ==
Chart (2014)	Peak position
US Heatseekers Albums (Billboard)	45
