= I Always Liked That Best =

Single by Cyndi Thomson

from the album My World
- Released: November 10, 2001
- Genre: Country
- Length: 3:03
- Label: Capitol Nashville
- Songwriter(s): Cyndi Thomson, Jennifer Kimball, Tommy Lee James
- Producer(s): Paul Worley, Tommy Lee James

Cyndi Thomson singles chronology
"What I Really Meant to Say" (2001)	"I Always Liked That Best" (2001)	"I'm Gone" (2002)

"I Always Liked That Best" is a song co-written and recorded by American country music artist Cyndi Thomson. It was released in November 2001 as the second single from the album My World. The song reached #21 on the Billboard Hot Country Singles & Tracks chart. The song was written by Thomson, Jennifer Kimball and Tommy Lee James.

== Chart performance ==
Chart (2001–2002)	Peak position
US Bubbling Under Hot 100 (Billboard)	19
US Hot Country Songs (Billboard)	21
