= What I Really Meant to Say =

Single by Cyndi Thomson

from the album My World
- B-side: "Things I Would Do"
- Released: March 26, 2001
- Recorded: 2000
- Studio: The Money Pit (Nashville, TN); Loud Recordings (Nashville, TN)
- Genre: Country
- Length: 3:20
- Label: Capitol Nashville
- Songwriters: Cyndi Thomson; Tommy Lee James; Chris Waters
- Producers: Tommy Lee James; Paul Worley

Cyndi Thomson singles chronology
| "What I Really Meant to Say" (2001) | "I Always Liked That Best" (2001) |

Music video
- "What I Really Meant to Say" on YouTube

"What I Really Meant to Say" is the debut single by American country music artist Cyndi Thomson. Thomson co-wrote the song with Tommy Lee James and Chris Waters, with the former co-producing the song with Paul Worley. The track was released via Capitol Records Nashville on March 26, 2001, as the lead single to her debut studio album My World (2001).

The song was a massive success, topping the US Hot Country Songs chart for three consecutive weeks and was one of 2001's most played songs at country radio. As of 2024, it is Thomson's sole number one single on the chart and as such, she has been credited as a one-hit wonder.

== Content ==
The song is a mid-tempo mostly accompanied by acoustic guitar and mandolin, with cello and penny whistle runs. The narrator is a female who runs into a former lover, and he asks her how she is. She tells him that she is "just fine", and then tells him that she really meant to say that she was still in love with him.

In the second verse, the male lover walks away from the female, and she is hurt. She tries to fight back tears, as she watches her lover.

== Music video ==
The music video was directed by Brent Hedgecock. It debuted to CMT on April 15, 2001. Thomson would receive the "Best New Artist Clip of the Year" award at the 2001 Billboard Music Video Awards.

== Critical reception ==
Thom Jurek of Allmusic gave the song a favorable review. He stated that "the single is clearly meant to put the album in hands and minds of country music radio station programmers. Ray Waddell of Billboard, in his review for My World, called the song "a sultry debut single [that] has an undercurrent of desperation."

== Commercial performance ==
"What I Really Meant to Say" debuted at number 53 on the US Billboard Hot Country Songs chart the week of March 31, 2001. It reached the top-forty the week of May 5, 2001 at number 37, becoming her first top-forty hit. The track entered the top-ten the week of August 4, 2001, at number 10, taking the biggest leap in the top-thirty. It rose to number five on August 25, the same week that Blake Shelton's single "Austin" was spending a third consecutive week at number one; this marked the first time since 1993 that two debut singles were simultaneously in the top-five of the chart.

On September 22, 2001, "What I Really Meant to Say" would top the US Hot Country Songs chart, displacing Toby Keith's "I'm Just Talkin' About Tonight" from the top spot. She became the third artist of the year to have their debut single reach number one after Shelton's "Austin" and Jamie O'Neal's "There Is No Arizona". The track also became Capitol Nashville's second number one single of the year following Keith Urban's "But for the Grace of God", which had ended an over two-year run of the label not getting a number one single. "What I Really Meant to Say" would top the chart for two more weeks and would overall spend 35 weeks on the chart.

After its commercial release, the song debuted at number five on the Top Country Singles Sales chart the week of May 26, 2001, simultaneously debuted at number 46 on the Hot Singles Sales chart. It would peak at number one on the former chart the week of June 16, 2001, selling 5,000 copies.

== Track listing ==
=== US CD single ===
1. "What I Really Meant to Say" (Cyndi Thomson, Tommy Lee James, Chris Waters)
2. "Things I Would Do" (Thomson, James, Robin Lerner)

== Charts ==
=== Weekly charts ===
| Chart (2001) | Peak position |
|---|---|
| US Hot Country Songs (Billboard) | 1 |
| US Billboard Hot 100 | 26 |
| US Top Country Singles Sales (Billboard) | 1 |
| US Hot Singles Sales (Billboard) | 12 |
| US Country Top 50 (Radio & Records) | 1 |

=== Year-end charts ===
| Chart (2001) | Position |
|---|---|
| US Country Songs (Billboard) | 10 |
| US Top Country Singles Sales (Billboard) | 7 |
| US Hot Singles Sales (Billboard) | 72 |
| US Country (Radio & Records) | 17 |
