= My List =

Single by Toby Keith

from the album Pull My Chain
- Released: January 1, 2002
- Genre: Country
- Length: 3:21
- Label: DreamWorks Nashville
- Songwriters: Tim James; Rand Bishop
- Producers: James Stroud; Toby Keith

Toby Keith singles chronology
"I Wanna Talk About Me" (2001)	"My List" (2002)	"Courtesy of the Red, White and Blue (The Angry American)" (2002)

"My List" is a song written by Tim James and Rand Bishop, and recorded by American country music artist Toby Keith. It was released on January 1, 2002, as the third and final single from Keith's 2001 album Pull My Chain. The song reached number one on the US Billboard Hot Country Songs chart and held that position for five weeks. It also peaked at number 26 on the Billboard Hot 100.

== Content ==
"My List" is a song about a man who has a list of things to do each day. He does what needs to be done each day, putting off what he really would like to do — spend time with his family. Eventually, he changes his mind and decides to put his family first, stating “Start livin', that's the next thing on [his] list".

== Music video ==
The music video was filmed in Ridgetop, Tennessee, after the September 11 attacks. Footage of the attack is shown at the beginning of the video, as a husband and his wife watch the news. The video ends by revealing that the husband in the video is a fireman, as he suits up to go fight a fire. Keith portrays a fireman riding to the fire station. It premiered on CMT on New Years Day, January 1, 2002.

== Appearances in media ==
Toby guest starred in a season eight episode of Touched by an Angel, "Most Likely to Succeed", singing this song. It originally aired on November 10, 2001.

== Chart positions ==
"My List" debuted at number 59 on the U.S. Billboard Hot Country Songs for the week of December 22, 2001.

Chart (2002)	Peak position
US Hot Country Songs (Billboard)	1
US Billboard Hot 100	26

=== Year-end charts ===
Chart (2002)	Position
US Country Songs (Billboard)	6
US Billboard Hot 100	94
