= Pull My Chain =

Studio album by Toby Keith
- Released: August 28, 2001
- Genre: Country
- Length: 43:43
- Label: DreamWorks
- Producers: James Stroud; Toby Keith

Toby Keith chronology
How Do You Like Me Now?! (1999)	Pull My Chain (2001)	Unleashed (2002)

Singles from Pull My Chain
- 1. "I'm Just Talkin' About Tonight" Released: May 31, 2001; 2. "I Wanna Talk About Me" Released: August 20, 2001; 3. "My List" Released: January 1, 2002

Professional ratings
Review scores
Source	Rating
Allmusic	4/5 stars
CMT.com	Favorable
Entertainment Weekly	B

Pull My Chain is the seventh studio album by American country music artist Toby Keith. It was released on August 28, 2001 by DreamWorks Records. The album has been certified 2× Multi-Platinum in the U.S. for sales of two million copies. All three of this album's singles — "I'm Just Talkin' About Tonight", "I Wanna Talk About Me", and "My List" — were Number One hits on the Hot Country Songs charts between 2001 and 2002. Also included here is the track "I Can't Take You Anywhere", which was released by its co-writer, Scotty Emerick, as a single in 2003. The album was dedicated to his father Hubert Keith (H.K.) Covel, who died in March 2001.

== Track listing ==
No.	Title	Writer(s)	Length
1.	"I'm Just Talkin' About Tonight"	Toby Keith; Scotty Emerick	2:45
2.	"I Wanna Talk About Me"	Bobby Braddock	3:04
3.	"I Can't Take You Anywhere"	Keith; Emerick	3:33
4.	"You Leave Me Weak"	Keith; Emerick	3:22
5.	"Tryin' to Matter"	Keith; Emerick	4:00
6.	"Pull My Chain"	Keith; Chuck Cannon	3:57
7.	"The Sha La La Song"	Keith; Cannon	3:23
8.	"Pick 'Em Up and Lay 'Em Down"	Dave Loggins	4:15
9.	"Forever Hasn't Got Here Yet"	Keith; Jim Femino	2:56
10.	"Yesterday's Rain"	Keith; Emerick	3:07
11.	"My List"	Tim James; Rand Bishop	3:21
12.	"You Didn't Have as Much to Lose"	Keith; Cannon	3:00
13.	"Gimme 8 Seconds"	Keith; Bernie Taupin	2:51

== Personnel ==
- Eddie Bayers – drums ("Gimme 8 Seconds")
- Mike Brignardello – bass guitar
- Scotty Emerick – background vocals ("I Can't Take You Anywhere"), acoustic guitar ("Tryin' to Matter")
- Paul Franklin – steel guitar
- Clayton Ivey – piano
- Toby Keith – lead vocals
- Brent Mason – electric guitar
- Steve Nathan – keyboards
- John Robinson – drums (all tracks except "Gimme 8 Seconds")
- Brent Rowan – electric guitar
- Biff Watson – acoustic guitar
- Curtis Wright – background vocals
- Curtis Young – background vocals

== Charts ==
=== Weekly charts ===
Chart (2001)	Peak position
US Billboard 200	9
US Top Country Albums (Billboard)	1

=== Year-end charts ===
Year-end chart performance for Pull My Chain
Chart (2001)	Position
Canadian Albums (Nielsen SoundScan)	168
Canadian Country Albums (Nielsen SoundScan)	12
US Billboard 200	138
US Top Country Albums (Billboard)	15

Chart (2002)	Position
Canadian Country Albums (Nielsen SoundScan)	18
US Billboard 200	45
US Top Country Albums (Billboard)	8

Chart (2003)	Position
US Top Country Albums (Billboard)	45

== Certifications ==
Region	Certification	Certified units/sales
Canada (Music Canada)	Gold	50,000^{^}
United States (RIAA)	2× Platinum	2,000,000^{^}
^{^} Shipments figures based on certification alone.
