= Wrong Again (song) =

Single by Martina McBride

from the album Evolution
- B-side: "Happy Girl"
- Released: September 14, 1998
- Genre: Country
- Length: 3:15
- Label: RCA Nashville
- Songwriters: Cynthia Weil; Tommy Lee James
- Producers: Paul Worley; Martina McBride

Martina McBride singles chronology
"Happy Girl" (1998)	"Wrong Again" (1998)	"Whatever You Say" (1999)

"Wrong Again" is a song recorded by American country music artist Martina McBride. It was written by Cynthia Weil and Tommy Lee James along with production by McBride and Paul Worley. It was released on September 14, 1998, as the second single from McBride's fourth studio album Evolution (1997). Neil Thrasher and Sara Evans appear as backing vocalists.

It was a commercial success for McBride, becoming her third number one hit on the US Hot Country Songs chart. An acoustic version was recorded and would be included on the compilation Playlist: The Very Best of Martina McBride (2008).

== Commercial performance ==
"Wrong Again" debuted at number 70 on the US Billboard Hot Country Songs for the week of September 19, 1998. It would top the chart the week of January 23, 1999 with 40 million audience impressions, displacing Alan Jackson's "Right on the Money". It would fall to number five the following week and was displaced with Jo Dee Messina's "Stand Beside Me"; this would be the last time a female artist replaced another on this chart until December 2007 when Taylor Swift's "Our Song" replaced Carrie Underwood's "So Small" from the top.

== Charts ==
Chart (1998–1999)	Peak position
Canada Country Singles (RPM)	5
US Billboard Hot 100	36
US Hot Country Songs (Billboard)	1

=== Year-end charts ===
Chart (1999)	Position
Canada Country Tracks (RPM)	91
US Country Songs (Billboard)	36
