= I'm Just Talkin' About Tonight =

Single by Toby Keith

from the album Pull My Chain
- B-side: "I Wanna Talk About Me"
- Released: May 31, 2001
- Recorded: 2000
- Genre: Country
- Length: 2:45
- Label: DreamWorks Nashville 450874
- Songwriters: Toby Keith; Scotty Emerick
- Producers: James Stroud; Toby Keith

Toby Keith singles chronology
"You Shouldn't Kiss Me Like This" (2000)	"I'm Just Talkin' About Tonight" (2001)	"I Wanna Talk About Me" (2001)

"I'm Just Talkin' About Tonight" is a song co-written and recorded by American country music artist Toby Keith. It was released on May 31, 2001 as the first single from his 2001 album Pull My Chain. The song reached number one on the US Billboard Hot Country Singles & Tracks (now Hot Country Songs) chart for the week of September 15, 2001. Keith wrote this song with Scotty Emerick.

== Content ==
Keith wrote about the inspiration for the song on his website. "I used to make my living in clubs, so I had ample opportunity to watch a lot of 'tomcats' hit on the ladies. The woman in this song says, "Well, I don't like bars and I don't usually do this." It's not saying go and get into bed; it's saying skip the B.S. and all the other chapters and the heck with why we're here; let's have an understanding - this is about right this minute. We're lonely; let's talk. It may not be politically correct, but it's honest, so in that regard, it's very representative of who I am. It's also very influenced by Guy Clark and Jerry Jeff Walker and that whole Texas sound. It's not Nashville or Dixie but Austin, straight out of the taproot of that tree."

== Critical reception ==
Ray Waddell, of Billboard magazine in his review of the album, called the song "a new honky-tonk standard."

== Music video ==
The music video was directed by Michael Salomon, and premiered on CMT Most Wanted Live on June 4, 2001. It shows Toby in "The Airport Hotel" ballroom singing while other people are trying to hook up. Pro Football Hall of Famer Terry Bradshaw makes a cameo.

== Chart performance ==
"I'm Just Talkin' About Tonight" debuted at number 41 on the U.S. Billboard Hot Country Singles & Tracks for the week of May 26, 2001.

Chart (2001)	Peak position
US Hot Country Songs (Billboard)	1
US Billboard Hot 100	27

=== Year-end charts ===
Chart (2001)	Position
US Country Songs (Billboard)	13
