= Evolution (Martina McBride album) =

Studio album by Martina McBride
- Released: August 26, 1997
- Genres: Country, country pop
- Length: 47:35
- Label: RCA Nashville
- Producers: Paul Worley, Martina McBride "Still Holding On" produced by Clint Black and James Stroud "Valentine" produced by Dan Shea

Martina McBride chronology
Wild Angels (1995)	Evolution (1997)	White Christmas (1998)

Singles from Evolution
- 1. "Still Holding On" Released: June 2, 1997; 2. "A Broken Wing" Released: September 8, 1997; 3. "Valentine" Released: September 8, 1997; 4. "Happy Girl" Released: April 20, 1998; 5. "Wrong Again" Released: September 14, 1998; 6. "Whatever You Say" Released: February 22, 1999

Professional ratings
Review scores
Source	Rating
AllMusic	4/5 stars
Chicago Tribune	3/4 stars

Evolution is the fourth studio album by American country music artist Martina McBride. It was released in August 1997 by RCA Nashville. The album produced six singles, all of which have charted on the US Billboard Hot Country Songs chart. The first single, "Still Holding On", is a duet with Clint Black and was originally recorded by Black on his 1997 album Nothin' but the Taillights. "Still Holding On" peaked at number 11. The second and fifth singles, "A Broken Wing" and "Wrong Again", both reached number one. "A Broken Wing" was also McBride's first single to chart on the Billboard Hot 100 and was her first major crossover hit. The album's third single, "Valentine", a duet with Jim Brickman", is a re-recording of a song which Brickman and McBride previously released from his 1997 album Picture This. The original Picture This version charted at #3 on the AC charts and #68 on the country charts, while the re-recording featured on the Evolution album was a Top 10 country hit, with a peak at number 9. The fourth and six singles, "Happy Girl" and "Whatever You Say", both peaked at number 2. The album was certified 3× Platinum by the RIAA.

"I'm Little But I'm Loud" is a recording of McBride when she was seven years old. This was McBride's first album to have a crossover-friendly country pop sound, which was a departure from her earlier neotraditional country albums.

== Track listing ==
No.	Title	Writer(s)	Length
1.	"I'm Little But I'm Loud"	Little Jimmy Dickens; Boudleaux Bryant	0:56
2.	"Happy Girl"	Beth Nielsen Chapman; Annie Roboff	3:27
3.	"Be That Way"	Bob DiPiero; Stephony Smith	3:34
4.	"A Broken Wing"	James House; Sam Hogin; Phil Barnhart	3:34
5.	"Wrong Again"	Cynthia Weil; Tommy Lee James	3:15
6.	"Keeping My Distance"	Jimmy Davis; Don Smith; Tommy Burroughs	3:51
7.	"Still Holding On" (with Clint Black)	Marty Stuart; Matraca Berg; Clint Black	3:57
8.	"Whatever You Say"	Ed Hill; Tony Martin	4:29
9.	"I Won't Close My Eyes"	Kevin Montgomery; Larry Gottlieb	3:38
10.	"I Don't Want to See You Again"	Jackson Leap	3:00
11.	"Some Say I'm Running"	Michael W. Smith; Brent Bourgeois	4:05
12.	"Here in My Heart"	Susan Ashton; Gayla Borders	3:51
13.	"One Day You Will"	Richard Leigh; Shane Teeters	2:36
14.	"Valentine" (featuring Jim Brickman)	Jim Brickman; Jack Kugell	3:22
Total length:			47:35

== Personnel ==
- Martina McBride – vocal (1), lead vocals (2–13), tambourine (4, 6, 9, 10, 12), backing vocals (6, 9, 12, 13), all vocals (14)
- John Hobbs – acoustic piano (2, 4, 5, 8, 10, 11, 13), Hammond B3 organ (6, 12)
- Tim Lauer – accordion (2, 9), harmonium (9)
- Matt Rollings – Hammond B3 organ (3)
- Robbie Buchanan – acoustic piano (7)
- Jim Brickman – acoustic piano (14)
- Dan Shea – synthesizers (14), rhythm programming (14)
- Daryl Schiff – acoustic guitar (1)
- Billy Joe Walker Jr. – acoustic guitar (2–5, 8, 10, 11), electric guitar (6, 13)
- Biff Watson – acoustic guitar (2, 4, 8, 9, 11, 12)
- Paul Worley – acoustic guitar (3, 5, 6, 9, 12), 12-string guitar (9), guitar thumping (13)
- Dean Parks – acoustic guitar (7)
- Dann Huff – electric guitar (2–14), electric guitar solo (3, 6), 12-string electric guitar (6), 6-string bass (9), gut-string guitar solo (11)
- Brent Mason – electric guitar (3)
- Clint Black – electric guitar (7), lead vocals (7)
- Pat Bergeson – electric guitar (12)
- Paul Franklin – steel guitar (3, 13)
- Dan Dugmore – steel guitar (4, 5, 6, 8–11), 12-string guitar (12)
- Joe Chemay – bass (2–13)
- Mike Brignardello – bass (14)
- Lonnie Wilson – drums (2–6, 8–13)
- John Robinson – drums (7)
- Tom Roady – percussion (2, 13), congas (2), shakers (2), tambourine (2)
- Chris Carmichael – fiddle (2)
- Stuart Duncan – fiddle (9), mandolin (9)
- Larry Franklin – fiddle (13)
- Jim Hoke – penny whistle (2)
- The Nashville String Machine – strings (14)
- Ronn Huff – string arrangements and conductor (14)
- Carl Gorodetzky – string contractor (14)
- Kim Richey – backing vocals (2)
- Gene Miller – backing vocals (3)
- Herb Pederson – backing vocals (3)
- Bob Bailey – backing vocals (4)
- Kim Fleming – backing vocals (4)
- Vicki Hampton – backing vocals (4)
- Sara Evans – backing vocals (5, 8)
- Neil Thrasher – backing vocals (5, 8)
- Danny Wilde – backing vocals (6, 9)
- Steve Real – backing vocals (7)
- Liana Manis – backing vocals (10)
- John Wesley Ryles – backing vocals (10)
- Susan Ashton – backing vocals (12)
- Mary Ann Kennedy – backing vocals (12)
- Jason Sellers – backing vocals (13)

== Production ==
- Produced by Paul Worley, Martina McBride, James Stroud, Dan Shea & Clint Black
- Engineered by Derek Bason, Al Grassmick, Tony Green, Eric Hellerman, Brent King, Julian King, Dean Jamison, John Nelson, Eric Legg, Jeanne Schiff, Clarke Schleicher & Ed Seay
- Mixed by Chuck Ainlay, Derek Bason & Mick Guzauski
- Mastered by Denny Purcell

== Chart performance ==
=== Weekly charts ===
Chart (1997–98)	Peak position
Canadian Albums (RPM)	80
Canadian Country Albums (RPM)	7
US Billboard 200	24
US Top Country Albums (Billboard)	4

=== Year-end charts ===
Chart (1997)	Position
US Top Country Albums (Billboard)	63
Chart (1998)	Position
US Billboard 200	108
US Top Country Albums (Billboard)	13
Chart (1999)	Position
US Billboard 200	163
US Top Country Albums (Billboard)	15

=== Singles ===
Year	Single	Peak chart positions					Certifications
Year	Single	US Country	US	US AC	CAN Country	CAN AC	Certifications
1997	"Still Holding On" (with Clint Black)	11	–	–	1	50	
1997	"A Broken Wing"	1	61	—	17	—	* RIAA: Gold
1997	"Valentine"	68	50	3	—	16	
1998	"Valentine" (re-release)	9	—	—	14	—	
1998	"Happy Girl"	2	—	—	4	—	
1999	"Wrong Again"	1	36	—	5	—	
1999	"Whatever You Say"	2	37	—	6	—	

== Certifications ==
Certifications for Evolution
Region	Certification	Certified units/sales
Canada (Music Canada)	Platinum	100,000^{^}
United States (RIAA)	3× Platinum	3,000,000^{^}
^{^} Shipments figures based on certification alone.
