= Cyndi Thomson =

American singer-songwriter (born 1976)

- Also known as: Cyndi Goodman
- Born: October 19, 1976 (age 49)
- Origin: Tifton, Georgia, United States
- Genres: Country
- Occupation: Singer-songwriter
- Instrument: Vocals
- Years active: 2000–2002, 2006–present
- Label: Capitol Nashville

Cyndi Thomson (born October 19, 1976) is an American country music artist. Thomson wrote songs with songwriter Tommy Lee James and in 2000, she signed with Capitol Records Nashville as a recording artist. She released her first album, My World, in 2001 and her debut single, "What I Really Meant to Say", became a number one hit on the Billboard Hot Country Singles & Tracks (now Hot Country Songs) charts. She later abandoned her recording career in 2002, but resumed recording in 2006.

== Biography ==
=== Early life ===
Cyndi Thomson was born and raised in Tifton, Georgia, the youngest of four daughters of Pat and Russ Thomson. As a child, she was exposed to many different types of music. Her parents listened to the oldies while her sisters listened to music by Manhattan Transfer and Janet Jackson among others. As Thomson got older, she began singing in church like her sisters did. At the age of twelve, she knew that she wanted to be a singer and at thirteen, after listening to Trisha Yearwood's "She's in Love with the Boy", she knew that she wanted to be a country singer.

After graduating high school and winning a Georgia Music Hall of Fame scholarship, Thomson attended Kennesaw State University in Kennesaw. Feeling that her dream of being a country singer was not going to be realized staying in Atlanta, she moved to Nashville, Tennessee. There, she attended Belmont University and enrolled in its music business program, but dropped out after a year and a half realizing that school was not necessary for her to do what she wanted to do. Thomson did various jobs while pursuing the recording career that she wanted, one of which was a modelling job at a party for Deana Carter's album Did I Shave My Legs for This? going platinum. One of the other models there later introduced Thomson to songwriter Tommy Lee James, who wrote for Brooks & Dunn and Martina McBride.

=== Music career ===
Even though Thomson had never written a song before, James agreed to work with her and within a year of writing their first song, Thomson signed with Sony-ATV Music Publishing as a songwriter. In 2000, James introduced Thomson to Capitol Records Nashville which signed her to a record deal immediately after hearing her sing three songs. Thomson co-wrote eight of the eleven songs on her debut album My World, released on July 31, 2001. Co-produced by James and producer Paul Worley, it became the best-selling debut album by a female country singer since LeAnn Rimes' album Blue was released in 1996. The album was certified gold, for selling more than 500,000 copies, by the Recording Industry Association of America ten months after the album's release.

Lead-off single "What I Really Meant to Say," written after an encounter with an older boy at a party one night, spent three weeks at the top of the Billboard Hot Country Singles & Tracks (now Hot Country Songs) charts. It also became the only debut single by a female country singer to spend more than one week at the top of the Radio & Records country chart. Her next two singles, "I Always Liked That Best" and "I'm Gone", failed to reach the top 20, with the former peaking at No. 21 and the latter peaking at No. 31 on the Billboard Hot Country Singles & Tracks chart.

In late 2002, Thomson, in a letter written to her record label, fans and friends, announced that she was walking away from her recording career. Thomson, who married musician and producer Daniel Goodman earlier that year, stated that being a recording artist was an "overwhelming life changing experience" and that she "cannot commit to [the] obligations" of making a new album. She did, however, contribute to the 2004 album Amazing Grace 3: A Country Salute to Gospel, on which she sang "'Tis So Sweet to Trust in Jesus". She also sang "Have Yourself A Merry Little Christmas" for the album Christmas Angels released by Capitol Nashville in 2005. "Life Ain't Always Beautiful", co-written by Thomson and credited to her as Cyndi Goodman, became a top five hit for Gary Allan in 2006. That year, she also returned to Capitol Nashville after leaving the label for four years and started recording for her second album with James.

On October 29, 2009, Thomson released her first new music album in eight years, This Time, a digital-only EP featuring five original songs.

On May 30, 2025, Logan Mize and Cyndi Thomson released a single, "Matters of the Heart," which appeared on a six-track EP titled Open Road, released June 27, 2025 on the label Big Yellow Dog Music. Thomson sings harmony on the chorus.

== Discography ==
=== Studio albums ===
| Title | Details | Peak chart positions | | Certifications and sales |
| Title | Details | US Country | US | Certifications and sales |
|---|---|---|---|---|
| My World | Release date: July 31, 2001; Label: Capitol Nashville; Formats: CD, cassette | 7 | 81 | US: Gold |

=== EPs ===
| Title | Details |
|---|---|
| This Time | Release date: October 29, 2009; Label: self-released; Formats: Music download |

=== Singles ===
| Year | Song | Peak positions | | | Album |
| Year | Song | US Country | US | US Bubbling | Album |
|---|---|---|---|---|---|
| 2001 | "What I Really Meant to Say" | 1 | 26 | — | My World |
| 2001 | "I Always Liked That Best" | 21 | — | 19 | My World |
| 2002 | "I'm Gone" | 31 | — | — | My World |
| 2002 | "If You Could Only See" | — | — | — | My World |
| 2011 | "Slow Me Down" | — | — | — | —N/a |
| 2016 | "Sippin' Wine on the Water" | — | — | — | —N/a |
| 2024 | "The Georgia In Me" | — | — | — | —N/a |
"—" denotes the release did not chart.

=== Music videos ===
| Year | Video | Director |
|---|---|---|
| 2001 | "What I Really Meant to Say" | Brent Hedgecock |
| 2001 | "I Always Liked That Best" | Trey Fanjoy |
| 2002 | "I'm Gone" | Trey Fanjoy |
