= I Wanna Talk About Me =

Single by Toby Keith

from the album Pull My Chain
- Released: August 20, 2001
- Recorded: 2000
- Genre: Country
- Length: 3:04
- Label: DreamWorks
- Songwriter: Bobby Braddock
- Producers: James Stroud; Toby Keith

Toby Keith singles chronology
"I'm Just Talkin' About Tonight" (2001)	"I Wanna Talk About Me" (2001)	"My List" (2002)

Music video
- "I Wanna Talk About Me" on YouTube

"I Wanna Talk About Me" is a song written by Bobby Braddock and recorded by American country music artist Toby Keith. The single was released on August 20, 2001 as the second single from Keith's 2001 album Pull My Chain. The song was his seventh number one single on the US Billboard Hot Country Singles & Tracks chart.

== Background ==
Braddock ("He Stopped Loving Her Today") initially intended the song for Blake Shelton's debut album, which Braddock produced. When audience testing of the song yielded negative results, Shelton's record label decided against including it on the album. Recalling the spoken-word verses of Keith's 1998 single "Getcha Some", Braddock then decided to pitch it to him.

Keith told Billboard magazine that he knew he would get "banged a little" for cutting the song. "They're going to call it a rap, [although] there ain't nobody doing rap who would call it a rap."

== Content ==
Similar to Keith's 1998 single "Getcha Some", "I Wanna Talk About Me" is cited as an example of country-rap, due to the use of a strong beat and rhythmically spoken lyrics. "I Wanna Talk About Me" tells of a male's frustration in his inability to converse with his partner, who wants to talk about herself. In the chorus, the singer states "I like talking about you, you, you, you, usually / But occasionally / I wanna talk about me". A musical strength of the song is its use of a I-V-vi-IV arpeggio played in a punchy rhythm.

== Critical reception ==
Ray Waddell, of Billboard magazine said that men could relate to the song, "which Keith manages to sell through sheer force of personality." For The Washington Post, Paul Farhi called the song "a good-natured ditty" whose chorus "is either a justified demand for equal time or the response of an egotistical jerk." In contrast, Stephen Thomas Erlewine of All Music Guide called the song a "mocking macho white-rap" and the "weakest track" on Pull My Chain.

Reviewing the music video, Edward Morris of Country Music Television called the video a "comic gem and all the proof...that Keith can handle any acting chore."

== Music video ==
The music video was directed by Michael Salomon and shows Keith in many different situations, including a man shopping with his girlfriend or wife, a police officer, a pimp, a motorcycle rider, and a surgeon. It premiered on CMT on August 28, 2001.

== Chart performance ==
"I Wanna Talk About Me" debuted at number 51 on the U.S. Billboard Hot Country Singles & Tracks for the week of August 25, 2001.

Chart (2001)	Peak position
US Hot Country Songs (Billboard)	1
US Billboard Hot 100	28

=== Year-end charts ===
Chart (2001)	Position
US Country Songs (Billboard)	60

Chart (2002)	Position
US Country Songs (Billboard)	40

== Certifications ==
Region	Certification	Certified units/sales
United States (RIAA)	Platinum	1,000,000^{‡}
^{‡} Sales+streaming figures based on certification alone.
