= Little Bit of You =

Single by Chase Bryant

from the EP Chase Bryant
- Released: March 30, 2015
- Genre: Country pop; country rock; pop rock
- Length: 3:06
- Label: Red Bow
- Songwriters: Chase Bryant; Derek George; Ashley Gorley
- Producers: Chase Bryant; Derek George

Chase Bryant singles chronology
| "Take It On Back" (2014) | "Little Bit of You" (2015) | "Room to Breathe" (2016) |

"Little Bit of You" is a song recorded by an American country music artist Chase Bryant. It was released in March 2015 as the second single from his self-titled EP. Bryant wrote the song with Derek George and Ashley Gorley.

== Critical reception ==
Taste of Country reviewed the single favorably, saying that "Chase Bryant’s “Little Bit of You” is an uptempo love song that should assimilate nicely with what country fans find on the radio. The newcomer will continue to draw comparisons to Keith Urban with this track. It's well-written pop-country with small windows for his musicianship."

== Music video ==
The music video was directed by Jeff Johnson and premiered in February 2016.

== Chart performance ==
The song has sold 131,000 copies in the US as of May 2016.

| Chart (2015–2016) | Peak position |
|---|---|
| Canada Country (Billboard) | 22 |
| US Billboard Hot 100 | 71 |
| US Country Airplay (Billboard) | 4 |
| US Hot Country Songs (Billboard) | 16 |

=== Year-end charts ===
| Chart (2015) | Position |
|---|---|
| US Country Airplay (Billboard) | 86 |

| Chart (2016) | Position |
|---|---|
| US Country Airplay (Billboard) | 23 |
| US Hot Country Songs (Billboard) | 54 |
