= Tommy Lee James =

American songwriter

Tommy Lee James is an American country music songwriter and record producer with Still Working Music Group. Based in Nashville, Tennessee, he is originally from Roanoke, Virginia.

He graduated from Northside High School then attended Radford University, where he studied voice. He moved to Nashville with dreams of becoming an artist, but then became a full-time songwriter.

James is the writer of a number of hit songs, including Reba McEntire's "And Still", Brooks & Dunn's "A Man This Lonely", Reba McEntire and Brooks & Dunn's duet "If You See Him/If You See Her", Martina McBride's "Wrong Again", Cyndi Thomson's "What I Really Meant to Say", and Tim McGraw's "She's My Kind of Rain". All these songs went to number one on the charts.

James had an additional chart topping success with "I Wish" recorded by Jo Dee Messina and "Let's Be Us Again" recorded by Lonestar which was a top 4 hit. He also co-wrote the critically acclaimed single by Gary Allan entitled "Life Ain't Always Beautiful".

James has had many other cuts with artists such as Cliff Richard, 98 Degrees, Pam Tillis, Blue County, Emerson Drive, Jedd Hughes, Little Big Town, Delta Goodrem, and Pussycat Dolls.

In addition to being a writer, James also produced albums for Capitol Records recording artists Cyndi Thomson, Susan Ashton and Emily West, Big Machine artist Danielle Peck, and former Lonestar vocalist Richie McDonald.

James' success continues in 2012 with Joe Walsh's new album, Analog Man, which was released on June 5, 2012 (co-produced by Jeff Lynne), and One Direction's new record, Take Me Home.

== Writing credits ==
Year	Artist	Song	Album
1993	Conway Twitty	"I Don't Love You"	Final Touches
1995	Reba McEntire	"And Still"	Read My Mind
1995	Joe Diffie	"She Loves Me"	Life's So Funny
1996	Reba McEntire	"It Don't Matter"	What If It's You
1996	Brooks & Dunn	"A Man This Lonely"	Borderline
1998	Martina McBride	"Wrong Again"	Evolution
1998	Pam Tillis	"Every Time"	Every Time
1998	Brooks & Dunn/Reba McEntire	"If You See Him/If You See Her"	If You See Him (McEntire) If You See Her (Brooks & Dunn)
2000	98 Degrees	"The Way You Do"	Revelation
2001	Cyndi Thomson	"What I Really Meant to Say"	My World
2003	Tim McGraw	"She's My Kind of Rain"	Tim McGraw and the Dancehall Doctors
2003	Jo Dee Messina	"I Wish"	Greatest Hits
2004	Lonestar	"Let's Be Us Again"	Let's Be Us Again
2004	Lee Ann Womack	"Time For Me To Go"	Greatest Hits
2006	Gary Allan	"Life Ain't Always Beautiful"	Tough All Over
2006	Danielle Peck	"Isn't That Everything"	Danielle Peck
2007	Delta Goodrem	"Believe Again"	Delta
2007	Delta Goodrem	"In This Life"	Delta
2007	Delta Goodrem	"You Will Only Break My Heart"	Delta
2007	Delta Goodrem	"One Day"	Delta
2007	Delta Goodrem	"Angels in the Room"	Delta
2007	Trisha Yearwood	"This Is Me You're Talking To"	Heaven, Heartache and the Power of Love
2007	Trisha Yearwood	"Nothin' 'Bout Memphis"	Heaven, Heartache and the Power of Love
2007	Martina McBride	"Tryin' to Find a Reason"	Waking Up Laughing
2007	Luna Halo	"Untouchable"	Luna Halo
2009	Emerson Drive	"I Love This Road"	Believe
2009	Orianthi	"God Only Knows"	Believe
2009	Gary Allan	"Today"	Get Off on the Pain
2010	Jessica Harp	"Letting Go"	A Woman Needs
2011	Ronnie Dunn	"Bleed Red"	Ronnie Dunn
2011	Pixie Lott	"All About Tonight"	Young Foolish Happy
2012	Joe Walsh	"Wrecking Ball"	Analog Man
2012	Joe Walsh	"And the Band Played On"	Analog Man
2012	Joe Walsh	"Family"	Analog Man
2012	Joe Walsh	"Lucky That Way"	Analog Man
2012	Easton Corbin	"Are You with Me"	All Over the Road
2012	One Direction	"They Don't Know About Us"	Take Me Home
2012	One Direction	"Loved You First"	Take Me Home
2012	Jennette McCurdy	"Better"	Jennette McCurdy
2012	Celine Dion	"Didn't Know Love"	Water and a Flame
2013	Lonestar	"Pretty Good Day"	Life As We Know It
2014	Lost Frequencies	"Are You With Me"	Are You With Me
2014	Blake Shelton	"My Eyes"	Based on a True Story...
2014	The Swon Brothers	"Pray For You"	The Swon Brothers
2014	Will Hoge	"Just Up The Road"	Small Town Dreams
2014	Will Hoge	"Middle Of America"	Small Town Dreams
2014	Will Hoge	"Growing Up Around Here"	Small Town Dreams
2014	Chase Bryant	"Take It On Back"	Chase Bryant
2014	Blake Shelton	"Good Country Song"	Bringing Back the Sunshine
2014	Tim Hicks	"She Don't Drink Whiskey Anymore"	5:01
2015	Reba McEntire	"Just Like Them Horses"	Love Somebody
2015	Reba McEntire	"Livin' Ain't Killed Me Yet"	Love Somebody
2015	Reba McEntire	"I'll Go On"	Love Somebody
2015	Easton Corbin	"Are You With Me"	About to Get Real
2016	Ronnie Dunn	"Still Feels Like Mexico"	Tattooed Heart
2016	Drake White	"Story"	Spark
2017	Robin Schulz	"Tonight and Every Night"	Uncovered
2017	Trace Adkins	"Gonna Make You Miss Me"	Something's Going On
2017	Kenny Chesney	"All The Pretty Girls"	Cosmic Hallelujah
2018	Deepend	"Only Love"	
2018	Tocadisco	"New World"	New World (EP)
2018	Oliver Moldan	"Dope"	Dope (EP)
2018	Oliver Moldan	"Forgettable"	Dope (EP)
2018	Nick Martin feat. Carly Paige	"Cool Love"	Cool Love (EP)
2019	Reba McEntire	"In His Mind"	Stronger Than the Truth
2019	Stafford Brothers	"Wolf"	Single
2019	Oliver Heldens feat. Nile Rodgers & Devin	"Summer Lover"	Single
2019	Plastik Funk & Alle Farben	"Find Your Way"	Single
2019	Richard Judge	"Miss America"	Single
2019	Alle Farben	"What Was I Drinking"	Sticker on My Suitcase
2019	Mr. Belt & Wezol	"Not Dancing"	Single
2019	3lau	"Miss Me More"	Single
2019	Mahama feat. Jason Walker	"Never Ending"	Single
2019	Justin Caruso feat. Wyn Starks	"Can't Live Without It"	Single
2019	Robin Schulz featuring Harlœ	"All This Love"	IIII
2020	Kyd the Band	"Go There"	Single
2020	Mika Setzer	"Happy for Ya"	Single
2020	Blake Shelton & Gwen Stefani	"Nobody but You"	Fully Loaded: God's Country
2021	Taylor Swift	"Untouchable (Taylor's Version)"	Fearless (Taylor's Version)
2021	Taylor Swift	"Don't You"	Fearless (Taylor's Version)
2024	Teddy Swims	You Still Get To Me	I've Tried Everything But Therapy (Part 1.5)
