= Chase Bryant =

American singer-songwriter (born 1992)

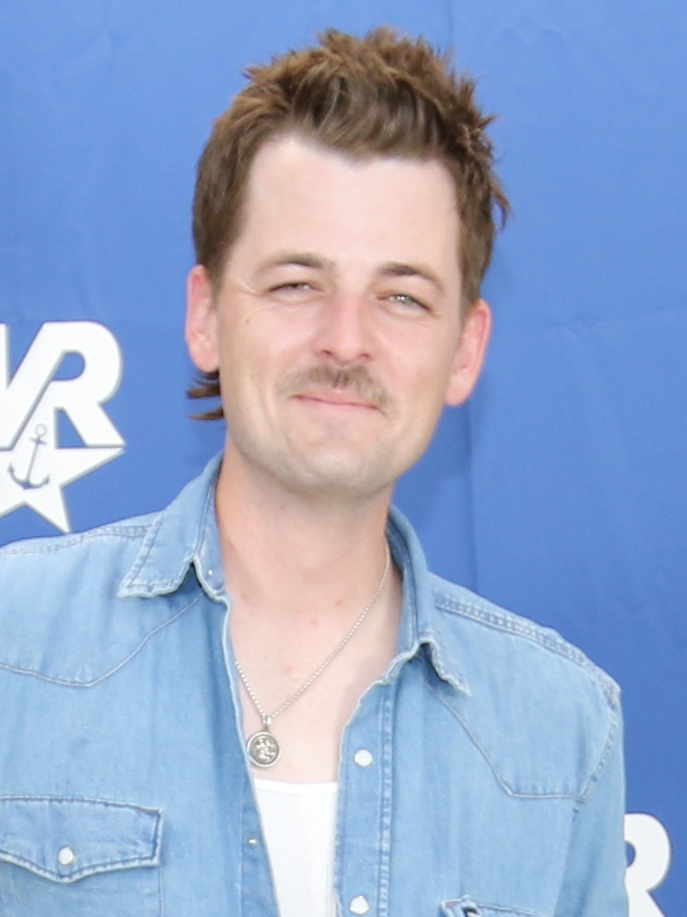
- Bryant in 2025

Background information
- Born: Chase Spencer Yaklin; October 9, 1992 (age 34); Orange Grove, Texas
- Origin: Nashville, Tennessee
- Genre: Country
- Occupations: Singer; songwriter
- Instruments: Vocals; guitar
- Years active: 2013–present
- Label: Red Bow

Chase Spencer Yaklin, better known by his stage name Chase Bryant (born October 9, 1992) is an American singer and songwriter. Bryant is a family name shared by his grandfather, Jimmy Bryant, who performed with Roy Orbison and Waylon Jennings.

In early 2015 Bryant's debut single, "Take It On Back", became a top 10 single on the Country Airplay chart, which is published weekly by Billboard. Bryant co-wrote and co-produced his debut EP, featuring the second single "Little Bit of You", which came out on September 23, 2014, on Red Bow Records.

== Musical career ==
Bryant is the grandson of Jimmy Bryant, who performed with Roy Orbison, and the nephew of Jeff and Junior Bryant, co-founders of the group Ricochet.

In August 2013, Bryant signed with Red Bow Records, a division of Broken Bow Records. A year later, he released his debut single "Take It On Back", which has charted in the top 10 of Billboard's Country Airplay chart. The EP album's second single, "Little Bit of You" released to country radio on March 30, 2015. "Room to Breathe", was released to country radio on July 4, 2016.

Bryant began touring with Brantley Gilbert in early 2015. After that Bryant was one of two opening acts, along with Billy Currington, on Tim McGraw's 2015 Shotgun Rider Tour. After leaving Broken Bow, Bryant self-released the album Upbringing in 2021.

== Musical stylings ==
Bryant is left-handed but plays a right-handed guitar upside-down.

== Discography ==
=== Studio albums ===
Title	Details	Peak positions
Title	Details	US Heat
Upbringing	Release date: July 16, 2021; Label: Green Iris Records	—
Cilo	Release date: December 13, 2024; Label: Alazan Records LLC	—
"–" denotes releases that did not chart

=== Extended plays ===
Title	Details	Peak positions
Title	Details	US Heat
Chase Yaklin	Release date: November 22, 2010; Label: HOR	—
Chase Bryant	Release date: September 23, 2014; Label: Red Bow	45
"—" denotes releases that did not chart

=== Singles ===
Year	Single	Peak chart positions				Sales	Album
Year	Single	US Country	US Country Airplay	US	CAN Country	Sales	Album
2014	"Take It On Back"	16	9	82	19	US: 111,000	Chase Bryant
2015	"Little Bit of You"	16	4	71	22	US: 131,000	Chase Bryant
2016	"Room to Breathe"	—	43	—	—		—N/a
2017	"Hell If I Know"	—	46	—	—		—N/a
2021	"Upbringing"	—	—	—	—		Upbringing
2022	"High, Drunk, and Heartbroke"	—	—	—	—		Upbringing
"—" denotes releases that did not chart

=== Music videos ===
Year	Video	Director
2014	"Take It On Back"	Wes Edwards
2016	"Little Bit of You"	Jeff Johnson
2016	"Room to Breathe"	Jeff Johnson
