= Robert Lee Castleman =

American musician

Robert Lee Castleman (born July 14, 1952) is a Nashville singer-songwriter.

== Career ==
He released his debut album, Crazy as Me, on Rounder Records on August 8 of 2000. The album received positive attention.

At the Grammy Awards in 2002, he won Best Country Song category as the writer of the song "The Lucky One," performed by Alison Krauss & Union Station.
