= Happy Girl =

Single by Martina McBride

from the album Evolution
- Released: April 20, 1998
- Recorded: 1997
- Genre: Country
- Length: 3:27
- Label: RCA Nashville
- Songwriters: Beth Nielsen Chapman; Annie Roboff
- Producers: Paul Worley; Martina McBride

Martina McBride singles chronology
"Valentine" (1997)	"Happy Girl" (1998)	"Wrong Again" (1998)

"Happy Girl" is a song written by Beth Nielsen Chapman and Annie Roboff, and recorded by American country music singer Martina McBride. It was released in April 1998 as the third single from McBride’s album Evolution. It reached a peak of number 2 on the U.S. country chart and number 4 on the Canadian country chart.

== Content ==
"Happy Girl" is a song in which the female narrator asserts her happiness with life. The song includes penny whistle and accordion.

McBride performed the song at the 32nd annual Country Music Association (CMA) awards. She later sang the song at the Macy's Thanksgiving Day Parade on November 26, 1998.

== Chart performance ==
"Happy Girl" debuted at number 70 on the Billboard Hot Country Singles & Tracks (now Hot Country Songs) chart dated for April 25, 1998. It spent 22 weeks on the chart, peaking at number 2 on the chart dated for August 8, 1998 and holding that position for two weeks.

Chart (1998)	Peak position
Canada Country Singles (RPM)	4
US Hot Country Songs (Billboard)	2

=== Year-end charts ===
Chart (1998)	Position
Canada Country Tracks (RPM)	83
US Country Songs (Billboard)	34
