= Blessed (Martina McBride song) =

Single by Martina McBride

from the album Greatest Hits
- B-side: "When God-Fearin' Women Get the Blues"
- Released: October 26, 2001
- Studio: The Money Pit (Nashville, TN)
- Genre: Country
- Length: 4:36 (album version)
- Label: RCA Nashville
- Songwriters: Brett James; Hillary Lindsey; Troy Verges
- Producers: Martina McBride; Paul Worley

Martina McBride singles chronology
| "When God-Fearin' Women Get the Blues" (2001) | "Blessed" (2001) | "Where Would You Be" (2002) |

Music video
- "Blessed" at CMT.com

"Blessed" is a song by American country music artist Martina McBride, recorded specifically for her Greatest Hits (2001) compilation album. The single was written by Brett James, Troy Verges, and Hillary Lindsey and was also produced by McBride and Paul Worley. Canadian country singer-songwriter Carolyn Dawn Johnson is featured as a background vocalist. "Blessed" began receiving airplay in late October 2001 as the second single from the compilation by RCA Nashville.

== Content ==
The narrator talks about how she is “blessed” in many ways.

In the Greatest Hits booklet, McBride called the song a great track and how she felt it was written for her, although it wasn't specifically written for the singer.

== Music video ==
Deaton-Flanigen Productions, a production company which specializes in country music videos, filmed the video for "Blessed". While the video is set in a forest, it was actually filmed on a sound stage in Nashville, Tennessee. It is the first video of hers to feature her two older daughters, Delaney and Emma, both of whom would later be featured in the videos for "This One's for the Girls" (2003) and "Teenage Daughters" (2011). The video also features McBride's husband John McBride. The video premiered to Country Music Television (CMT) on December 9, 2001. It was a huge hit and would be nominated at the inaugural 2002 CMT Flameworthy Awards for Female Video of the Year and Fashion Plate Video of the Year, with Deaton-Flanigen nominated for Video Director of the Year. "Blessed" would win Female Video, losing Fashion Plate Video to Chely Wright's "Jezebel" while Deaton-Flanigen won Video Director.

== Personnel ==
Compiled from liner notes.

- Matt Chamberlain — drums
- David Huff — programming
- Carolyn Dawn Johnson — background vocals
- Troy Lancaster — electric guitar
- B. James Lowry — acoustic guitar
- Martina McBride — lead and background vocals
- Jerry McPherson — electric guitar
- Steve Nathan — Hammond B-3 organ
- Biff Watson — acoustic guitar
- Glenn Worf — bass guitar
- Jonathan Yudkin — violin, viola, cello

== Charts ==
"Blessed" debuted at number 56 on the US Billboard Hot Country Songs chart for the week of November 3, 2001. In March 2002, it peaked at number one, becoming McBride's fifth and final number one hit on the chart. It was also the last song by a solo female artist to top the chart until Gretchen Wilson's debut single "Redneck Woman" in 2004.

| Chart (2001–2002) | Peak position |
|---|---|
| US Hot Country Songs (Billboard) | 1 |
| US Billboard Hot 100 | 31 |

=== Year-end charts ===
| Chart (2002) | Position |
|---|---|
| US Country Songs (Billboard) | 9 |
