= Where Would You Be =

Single by Martina McBride

from the album Greatest Hits
- B-side: "Concrete Angel"
- Released: April 22, 2002
- Genre: Country
- Length: 4:04
- Label: RCA Nashville
- Songwriters: Rick Ferrell; Rachel Proctor
- Producers: Martina McBride; Paul Worley

Martina McBride singles chronology
"Blessed" (2001)	"Where Would You Be" (2002)	"Practice Life" (2002)

Music video
- "Where Would You Be" at CMT.com

"Where Would You Be" is a song by American country music artist Martina McBride, recorded for her Greatest Hits (2001) compilation album. The song was penned by country musician Rachel Proctor and Rick Ferrell and was produced by McBride and Paul Worley. Lyrically, the song speaks of McBride acknowledging her failed relationship and questioning her partner "where he would be" if he wasn't with her. RCA Records Nashville sent the single to country radio on April 22, 2002 as the third single from the compilation.

"Where Would You Be" became McBride's 15th top ten hit, peaking at number three on the US Hot Country Songs chart.

== Content ==
Producer Paul Worley thought that the song "challenged Martina more than any song ever has", and McBride said that she enjoyed "the rawness" of it.

== Music video ==
The music video was directed by Morris Abraham and premiered in May 2002.

== Critical reception ==
Deborah Evans Price from Billboard magazine gave the single a positive review. She said, "McBride is belting out those stratosphere notes that have become her stock-in-trade. It's a stunning vocal performance, and the production soars and swells alongside McBride's vocals." She ended her review by saying McBride has "chalked up yet another hit."

== Charts ==
"Where Would You Be" debuted at number 45 on the US Billboard Hot Country Songs chart for the week of May 11, 2002. It peaked at number three the week of October 19, 2002, becoming McBride's third longest running single on the chart.

Chart (2002)	Peak position
US Hot Country Songs (Billboard)	3
US Billboard Hot 100	45

=== Year-end charts ===
Chart (2002)	Position
US Country Songs (Billboard)	27
