= Cluck Old Hen =

Appalachian folk tune

"Cluck Old Hen" (Roud 4235), also known by variants like "Cacklin' Hen", is a popular Appalachian old time tune usually in the mixolydian or dorian mode (as in the score below which is in A dorian). It is played either as an instrumental or with lyrics, which vary from one version to another. One of the earliest reported transcriptions of the tune dates from 1886. The earliest audio recording is attributed to Fiddlin' John Carson, in 1923.

== Synopsis ==
The song describes the exploits of an "old hen" who performs various acts, such as laying ten eggs for railroad men. The song is made up of 'floating verses' with chorus of the song generally going:

Cluck old hen, cluck and squall,
Ain't laid an egg since way last fall,
Cluck old hen, cluck and sing,
Ain't laid an egg since way last spring

== Score ==
A typical version of the tune goes as follows:

== See also ==
- Old time music
