= Whatever You Say =

Single by Martina McBride

from the album Evolution
- B-side: "Be That Way"
- Released: February 22, 1999
- Genre: Country
- Length: 4:29
- Label: RCA Nashville
- Songwriters: Ed Hill; Tony Martin
- Producers: Paul Worley; Martina McBride

Martina McBride singles chronology
"Wrong Again" (1998)	"Whatever You Say" (1999)	"I Love You" (1999)

"Whatever You Say" is a song written by Ed Hill and Tony Martin and recorded by American country music artist Martina McBride. It was released in February 1999 as the fifth and final single from McBride’s album Evolution. The song peaked at number 2 on the US Billboard Hot Country Songs and at number 37 on the Billboard Hot 100. It also peaked at number 6 on the Canadian RPM chart.

== Background ==
"Whatever You Say" is a slow contemporary-styled ballad, which was the theme of McBride's album that this song was released on.

== Content ==
The ballad is a first-person perspective of someone who is experiencing emotional invalidation. It may even evoke a sense of gaslighting or minimization for some listeners with lyrics of "You think I'm always making/ Something out of nothing/ You're saying, 'Everything's ok'." and "Now, we can change the subject/ Pretend I never brought it up/ Same old story, anyway." The chorus culminates in a powerful plea, where the singer expresses that the other party is hearing them speak, but not listening, and that the future of their relationship will depend on the other person's response that plea.

Sara Evans and Neil Thrasher sing backing vocals.

In the official music video, examples of different types of relationships are intermittently shown and highlight that the sense of emotional invalidation can occur in a variety of interpersonal relationships.

== Chart performance ==
"Whatever You Say" was issued as the fifth and final single from Martina McBride's fourth album, Evolution, which was a multi-platinum success. The song was released as a single to country radio in early 1999, peaking at number 2 on the Hot Country Songs chart and number 37 on the Billboard Hot 100, becoming one of two singles spawned from the album that reached number 2 ("Happy Girl" was the first). The song also reached a peak of number 6 on the Canadian RPM chart that same year, becoming her sixth Top 10 on that chart.

Chart (1999)	Peak position
Canada Country Singles (RPM)	6
US Billboard Hot 100	37
US Hot Country Songs (Billboard)	2

=== Year-end charts ===
Chart (1999)	Position
Canada Country Tracks (RPM)	54
US Country Songs (Billboard)	17

== Parodies ==
- American country music parody artist Cledus T. Judd released a parody of "Whatever You Say" titled "What the *$@# Did You Say".
