= The Lucky One (Alison Krauss song) =

Single by Alison Krauss & Union Station

from the album New Favorite
- Released: 2001
- Recorded: 2001
- Genre: Country
- Length: 3:06
- Label: Rounder Records
- Songwriter(s): Robert Lee Castleman
- Producer(s): Alison Krauss & Union Station

Alison Krauss & Union Station singles chronology
"Maybe" (2000)	"The Lucky One" (2001)	"I'll Fly Away" (2001)

"The Lucky One" is a song by bluegrass music group Alison Krauss & Union Station, released in 2001 as the first single from their fourth album, New Favorite. Of the three singles released from the album, this song was the only one to chart, peaking at number 46 on the U.S. Billboard Hot Country Songs chart in 2003. The song also won a Grammy for Best Country Performance by a Duo or Group with Vocal as well as Best Country Song.

A music video was filmed and released prior to the release of the song.

== Chart performance ==
Chart (2001–2003)	Peak position
US Hot Country Songs (Billboard)	46
