= Valentine (Jim Brickman song) =

Single by Martina McBride and Jim Brickman

from the album Evolution
- A-side: "A Broken Wing"
- Released: September 8, 1997
- Genre: Smooth jazz
- Length: 3:22
- Label: RCA Nashville
- Songwriters: Jim Brickman; Jack Kugell
- Producer: Dan Shea

Martina McBride singles chronology
"A Broken Wing" (1997)	"Valentine" (1997)	"Happy Girl" (1998)

"Valentine" is a song co-written and performed by American recording artist Jim Brickman, with a guest vocal from Martina McBride. It first appeared on his 1997 album Picture This, and later on McBride's album Evolution.

== Chart performance ==
The song charted on the Billboard Hot 100 and Adult Contemporary charts in 1997, peaking at number 50 on the former and number 3 on the latter. Although it first appeared on the Hot Country Songs charts at that time, it was not officially released as a single to the country format until a year later. The song was the follow-up to McBride's single "A Broken Wing," for which "Valentine" originally served as the B-side. Upon its official release, "Valentine" peaked at number 9.

== Charts ==
=== Weekly charts ===
Chart (1997)	Peak position
Canada Adult Contemporary (RPM)	16
US Billboard Hot 100	50
US Adult Contemporary (Billboard)	3
US Hot Country Songs (Billboard)	53
Chart (1998)	Peak position
Canada Country Singles (RPM)	14
US Hot Country Songs (Billboard)	9

=== Year-end charts ===
Chart (1997)	Position
US Adult Contemporary (Billboard)	12
