= When God-Fearin' Women Get the Blues =

"When God Fearin' Women Get the Blues"

Single by Martina McBride

from the album Greatest Hits
- B-side: "Blessed"
- Released: June 25, 2001
- Genre: Country
- Length: 5:00 (full version); 0:52 (album intro); 4:08 (album version)
- Label: RCA Nashville
- Songwriter: Leslie Satcher
- Producers: Martina McBride; Paul Worley

Martina McBride singles chronology
"It's My Time" (2000)	"When God Fearin' Women Get the Blues" (2001)	"Blessed" (2001)

"When God-Fearin' Women Get the Blues" is a song by American country music artist Martina McBride, recorded for her Greatest Hits (2001) compilation album. The song was written by Leslie Satcher and produced by McBride and her frequent collaborator Paul Worley. The song was chosen as the lead single from the compilation by RCA Records Nashville on June 25, 2001.

== Content ==
According to producer Paul Worley, the song's writer, Leslie Satcher, wrote it before a demo session. McBride went on to praise Satcher's writing style and loved being able to use more traditionally country instruments like the fiddle and Dobro. McBride chose to include Dan Tyminski as a backing vocalist after hearing him sing "I Am a Man of Constant Sorrow" in the movie O Brother, Where Art Thou?

== Critical reception ==
Billboard magazine gave "When God-Fearin' Women Get the Blues" a positive review, noting that "This one deserves to join its predecessors on a "greatest" set. Pure energy from a format favorite and great fun to boot." The magazine also called it "the best song that Patty Loveless never recorded."

== Commercial performance ==
"When God-Fearin' Women Get the Blues" debuted at number 53 on the US Billboard Hot Country Songs chart for the week of June 30, 2001, becoming the "Hot Shot Debut" of the week. It peaked at number eight on October 27, 2001, becoming McBride's 13th top ten hit, but the lowest peaking singles from Greatest Hits. Country radio, however, did not like the record, with radio programmers naming it their fourth least-favorite song of the year according to Gavin Report.

It also peaked at number 64 on the all-genre Billboard Hot 100.

== Personnel ==
- Matt Chamberlain — drums
- Jerry Douglas — Dobro
- Larry Franklin — fiddle
- Troy Johnson — background vocals
- B. James Lowry — acoustic guitar
- Martina McBride — lead vocals
- Jerry McPherson — electric guitar
- Steve Nathan — piano
- Dan Tyminski — background vocals
- Biff Watson — acoustic guitar
- Glenn Worf — bass guitar

== Charts ==
Weekly chart performance for "When God-Fearin' Women Get the Blues"
Chart (2001)	Peak position
US Billboard Hot 100	64
US Hot Country Songs (Billboard)	8
US Radio Songs (Billboard)	61

=== Year-end charts ===
Chart (2001)	Position
US Country Songs (Billboard)	44

== Release history ==
Release dates and format(s) for "When God-Fearin' Women Get the Blues"
Region	Date	Format(s)	Label(s)	Ref.
United States	June 25, 2001	Country radio	RCA Nashville Records	
