= A Broken Wing =

Single by Martina McBride

from the album Evolution
- B-side: Valentine"
- Released: September 8, 1997
- Genre: Country
- Length: 3:34
- Label: RCA Nashville
- Songwriters: Phil Barnhart; Sam Hogin; James House
- Producers: Paul Worley; Ed Seay

Martina McBride singles chronology
"Still Holding On" (1997)	"A Broken Wing" (1997)	"Valentine" (1997)

"A Broken Wing" is a song written by James House, Sam Hogin, and Phil Barnhart, and recorded by American country music singer Martina McBride. It was released in September 1997 as the second single from McBride's album Evolution. In January 1998, "A Broken Wing" became McBride's second Number One single.

== Background ==
"A Broken Wing" is in the key of B major with a time signature of 12/8. The verses use a chord progression of I–ii–IV–I three times, followed by I–ii^{7}–IV–V–I; the refrain uses vi–iii^{7}–ii^{7}–I followed by I–ii^{7}–IV–V–I. Instrumentally, McBride's 1998 version features acoustic guitar, electric guitar, pedal steel guitar, piano, bass guitar and drums.

== Content ==
In the song, the narrator recounts a young woman escaping from an emotionally abusive relationship. Regarding the second verse, wherein the husband finds "a note by the window / and the curtains blowin' in the breeze," the authors of the book My Country Roots wrote the song's conclusion could be interpreted to indicate the woman either escaped or committed suicide.

Producer Paul Worley told Billboard magazine in 1998 the track, except for the backing vocals, was recorded in one day, while other tracks on the album were recorded in pieces over time.

== Critical reception ==
Kevin John Coyne of Country Universe rated the song "A", praising its lyrical themes of emotional abuse as well as the strength of McBride's vocals on the chorus.

== Music video ==
The music video was directed by Robert Deaton III and George Flanigen IV, also collectively known as Deaton-Flanigen Productions. The video features McBride singing the song at the Croft House in the Nashville Zoo at Grassmere. Interspersed throughout the clip is a woman locked in an abusive relationship with her husband. While making dinner, the husband complains about the salad she made for him. Later, when the woman is on the phone, her husband interrupts the call. Eventually, the wife gets up out of the bed and the husband goes upstairs, only to find a note left by the disappeared wife.

It was nominated for Music Video of the Year at the 1998 Country Music Association awards.

== Personnel ==
- Bob Bailey – backing vocals
- Joe Chemay – bass guitar
- Dan Dugmore – pedal steel guitar
- Kim Fleming – backing vocals
- Vicki Hampton – backing vocals
- Dann Huff – electric guitar
- Martina McBride – lead and backing vocals, tambourine
- Biff Watson – acoustic guitar
- Billy Joe Walker Jr. – acoustic guitar
- Lonnie Wilson – drums

== Other versions ==
Jordin Sparks covered the song on her 2007 EP Jordin Sparks. Her version of the song made number 66 on the Billboard Hot 100.

== Chart positions ==
"A Broken Wing" debuted on the Hot Country Singles & Tracks (now Hot Country Songs) charts dated for September 13, 1997. The song spent twenty-five weeks on that chart, peaking at number one on the charts dated for January 10, 1998.

Chart (1997–1998)	Peak position
Canada Country Singles (RPM)	17
US Billboard Hot 100	61
US Hot Country Songs (Billboard)	1

=== Year-end charts ===
Chart (1998)	Position
US Country Songs (Billboard)	60

== Certifications ==
Region	Certification	Certified units/sales
United States (RIAA)	Gold	500,000^{‡}
^{‡} Sales+streaming figures based on certification alone.
