= Alison Krauss discography =

Alison Krauss / Alison Krauss & Union Station discography
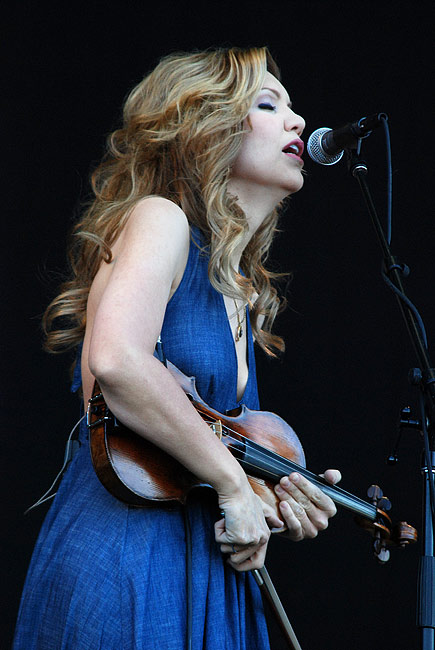
- Krauss performing at Bonnaroo in 2008
- Studio albums: 5
- Live albums: 1
- Compilation albums: 5
- Singles: 36
- Music videos: 33
- Union Station albums: 7
- Collaborative albums: 3

The discography of American country and bluegrass singer Alison Krauss consists of fifteen studio albums—five solo, seven with her group Union Station, and three collaboration albums (one with The Cox Family, the others with former Led Zeppelin frontman Robert Plant). She has also released four compilation albums, one live album (with Union Station), and over 30 singles. Her most successful album, Live, has been certified 2× Platinum.

In addition, she has appeared on numerous soundtracks and helped renew interest in bluegrass music in the United States. Her soundtrack performances have led to further popularity, including the O Brother, Where Art Thou? soundtrack, which won the Grammy Award for Album of the Year in 2002 and is also credited with raising American interest in bluegrass, and the Cold Mountain soundtrack, which led to her performance at the 2004 Academy Awards. During her career she has won 28 Grammy Awards, making her the most awarded female artist (and the second most awarded artist overall) in Grammy history.

Her collaboration album with Plant, Raising Sand, debuted at number 2 on both the Top Country Albums chart and the Billboard 200, giving Krauss her highest entry on both charts. The album has been certified Platinum in the United States. It became a worldwide hit, charting within the Top 10 of several countries, including a number-one peak in Norway. It also won the Grammy Award for Album of the Year in 2009; in addition, its single "Please Read the Letter" won the Grammy Award for Record of the Year that same year.

== Studio albums ==
Title	Album details	Peak chart positions										Certifications
Title	Album details	US	US Country	AUS	CAN	CAN Country	NL	NOR	NZ	SWE	UK	Certifications
Different Strokes (with Jim Hoiles and Swamp Weiss)	Release date: 1985; Label: Fiddle Tunes	—	—	—	—	—	—	—	—	—	—	
Too Late to Cry	Release date: 1987; Label: Rounder	—	—	—	—	—	—	—	—	—	—	
I've Got That Old Feeling	Release date: June 13, 1990; Label: Rounder	—	61	—	—	—	—	—	—	—	—	
I Know Who Holds Tomorrow (with The Cox Family)	Release date: January 28, 1994; Label: Rounder	—	—	—	—	—	—	—	—	—	—	
Forget About It	Release date: August 3, 1999; Label: Rounder	60	5	—	—	5	—	—	—	—	77	RIAA: Gold
Raising Sand (with Robert Plant)	Release date: October 23, 2007; Label: Rounder	2	2	45	5	—	26	1	3	2	2	RIAA: Platinum; BPI: 2× Platinum; MC: Platinum
Windy City	Release date: February 17, 2017; Label: Capitol	9	1	70	—	—	—	—	—	—	6	
Raise the Roof (with Robert Plant)	Release date: November 19, 2021; Label: Rounder	7	3	18	16	—	16	3	7	9	5	BPI: Silver
"—" denotes releases that did not chart.

=== As Alison Krauss & Union Station ===
Title	Album details	Peak chart positions						Certifications
Title	Album details	US	US Country	US Grass	CAN	NL	UK	Certifications
Two Highways	Release date: 1989; Label: Rounder	—	—	—	—	—	—	
Every Time You Say Goodbye	Release date: February 14, 1992; Label: Rounder	—	75	—	—	—	—	
So Long So Wrong	Release date: March 25, 1997; Label: Rounder	45	4	—	—	—	123	RIAA: Gold
New Favorite	Release date: August 14, 2001; Label: Rounder	35	3	2	—	—	72	RIAA: Gold
Lonely Runs Both Ways	Release date: November 23, 2004; Label: Rounder	29	6	1	—	90	126	RIAA: Gold
Paper Airplane	Release date: April 12, 2011; Label: Rounder	3	1	1	23	49	11	BPI: Silver
Arcadia	Release date: March 28, 2025; Label: Down the Road	156	29	1	—	92	—	
"—" denotes releases that did not chart.

== Compilation albums ==
Title	Album details	Peak chart positions								Certifications
Title	Album details	US	US Country	CAN Country	NL	NOR	NZ	SWE	UK	Certifications
Now That I've Found You: A Collection	Release date: February 7, 1995; Label: Rounder Records	13	2	1	—	—	—	—	123	RIAA: 2× Platinum; BPI: Silver; MC: Gold
Home on the Highways: Band Picked Favorites	Release date: May 10, 2005; Label: Cracker Barrel	—	—	—	—	—	—	—	—	
A Hundred Miles or More: A Collection	Release date: April 3, 2007; Label: Rounder Records	10	3	—	91	7	—	—	38	RIAA: Gold; BPI: Silver
Essential Alison Krauss	Release date: July 21, 2009; Label: Decca Records UK	—	—	—	—	—	25	37	13	BPI: Silver
"—" denotes releases that did not chart.

== Live albums ==
Title	Album details	Peak chart positions			Certifications
Title	Album details	US	US Country	US Grass	Certifications
Live (with Union Station)	Release date: November 5, 2002; Label: Rounder Records	36	9	1	MC: Gold; RIAA: 2× Platinum

== Singles ==
Year	Single	Peak chart positions							Album
Year	Single	US Bub.	US Country	US AAA	US AC	CAN Country	CAN AC	UK	Album
1991	"I've Got That Old Feeling"	—	—	—	—	82	—	—	I've Got That Old Feeling
1991	"Steel Rails"	—	73	—	—	—	—	—	I've Got That Old Feeling
1994	"Walk Over God's Heaven" (with The Cox Family)	—	—	—	—	—	—	—	I Know Who Holds Tomorrow
1995	"Baby Now That I've Found You"	—	49	—	—	46	—	95	Now That I've Found You: A Collection
1996	"Baby Mine"	—	—	—	—	82	—	—	The Best of Country Sing the Best of Disney
1996	"Moments Like This"	—	—	—	—	—	—	—	Twister (soundtrack)
1998	"I Give You to His Heart"	—	—	—	—	—	—	—	The Prince of Egypt: Nashville (soundtrack)
1999	"Forget About It"	—	67	—	—	—	74	—	Forget About It
1999	"Stay"	—	—	—	28	—	—	—	Forget About It
2000	"Maybe"	—	—	—	—	—	—	—	Forget About It
2001	"I'll Fly Away" (with Gillian Welch)	—	—	—	—	—	—	—	O Brother Where Art Thou? (soundtrack)
2002	"Sitting in the Window of My Room"	—	—	—	—	—	—	—	Divine Secrets of the Ya-Ya Sisterhood (soundtrack)
2003	"How's the World Treating You" (with James Taylor)	—	—	—	—	—	—	—	Livin', Lovin', Losin': Songs of the Louvin Brothers
2004	"You Will Be My Ain True Love" (with Sting)	—	—	—	—	—	—	—	Cold Mountain (soundtrack)
2006	"Jubilee"	—	—	—	—	—	—	—	Paper Clips (soundtrack)
2006	"Missing You" (with John Waite)	—	34	—	—	—	—	—	A Hundred Miles or More: A Collection
2007	"Simple Love"	—	—	—	—	—	—	—	A Hundred Miles or More: A Collection
2007	"Gone, Gone, Gone (Done Moved On)" (with Robert Plant)	—	—	2	—	—	—	—	Raising Sand
2007	"Stick With Me Baby" (with Robert Plant)	—	—	—	—	—	—	—	Raising Sand
2008	"Please Read the Letter" (with Robert Plant)	20	—	22	—	—	—	—	Raising Sand
2008	"Rich Woman" (with Robert Plant)	18	—	—	—	—	—	—	Raising Sand
2008	"Shadows" (with Tony Rice)	—	—	—	—	—	—	—	Non-album single
2017	"Windy City"	—	—	—	—	—	—	—	Windy City
2017	"River in the Rain"	—	—	—	—	—	—	—	Windy City
2021	"Can't Let Go" (with Robert Plant)	—	— (Note: "Can't Let Go" did not enter the Billboard Hot Country Songs chart, but peaked at number 16 on the Country Digital Song Sales chart.)	8	—	—	—	—	Raise the Roof
"—" denotes releases that did not chart.

=== As Alison Krauss & Union Station ===
Year	Single	Peak chart positions				Certifications	Album
Year	Single	US	US Country	CAN Country	UK	Certifications	Album
1992	"Heartstrings"	—	—	—	—		Every Time You Say Goodbye
1992	"New Fool"	—	—	86	—		Every Time You Say Goodbye
1993	"Every Time You Say Goodbye"	—	—	—	—		Every Time You Say Goodbye
1995	"When You Say Nothing at All"	53	3	7	81	RIAA: Gold	Keith Whitley: A Tribute Album
1997	"Find My Way Back to My Heart"	—	73	97	—		So Long, So Wrong
1997	"Looking in the Eyes of Love"	—	—	86	—		So Long, So Wrong
2001	"The Lucky One"	—	46	—	—		New Favorite
2002	"Let Me Touch You for a While"	—	—	—	—		New Favorite
2002	"New Favorite"	—	—	—	—		New Favorite
2003	"Every Time You Say Goodbye" (with James Taylor)	—	—	—	—		Live
2004	"Restless"	—	36	—	—		Lonely Runs Both Ways
2005	"Goodbye Is All We Have"	—	—	—	—		Lonely Runs Both Ways
2006	"If I Didn't Know Any Better"	—	—	—	—		Lonely Runs Both Ways
2011	"Paper Airplane"	—	— (Note: "Paper Airplane" did not enter the Billboard Hot Country Songs chart, but peaked at number 41 on the Country Digital Song Sales chart.)	—	—		Paper Airplane
2012	"My Love Follows You Where You Go"	—	—	—	—		Paper Airplane
"—" denotes releases that did not chart.

=== As a featured artist ===
Year	Single	Peak chart positions				Certifications	Album
Year	Single	US	US Country	CAN Country	CAN AC	Certifications	Album
1994	"Teach Your Children" (as The Red Hots) (Note: The Red Hots is a multi-artist collaboration featuring Crosby, Stills & Nash, Suzy Bogguss, Alison Krauss, and Kathy Mattea.)	—	75	—	—		Red Hot + Country
1995	"Somewhere in the Vicinity of the Heart" (Shenandoah featuring Alison Krauss)	—	7	7	—		In the Vicinity of the Heart
1997	"Whenever I Call You Friend" (Michael Johnson featuring Alison Krauss)	—	—	—	—		Then and Now
1997	"It's Not Over" (Mark Chesnutt featuring Vince Gill and Alison Krauss)	—	34	34	—		Thank God for Believers
1998	"Same Old Train" (Note: Multi-artist collaboration featuring Clint Black, Joe Diffie, Merle Haggard, Emmylou Harris, Alison Krauss, Patty Loveless, Earl Scruggs, Ricky Skaggs, Marty Stuart, Pam Tillis, Randy Travis, Travis Tritt and Dwight Yoakam.)	—	59	—	—		Tribute to Tradition
1999	"Get Me Through December" (Natalie MacMaster featuring Alison Krauss)	—	—	—	40		In My Hands
2000	"Buy Me a Rose" (Kenny Rogers featuring Billy Dean and Alison Krauss)	40	1	9	—		She Rides Wild Horses
2004	"Whiskey Lullaby" (Brad Paisley featuring Alison Krauss)	41	3	—	—	RIAA: 2× Platinum; BPI: Silver; MC: Platinum; RMNZ: Platinum	Mud on the Tires
2005	"Across the Universe" (Alicia Keys, Alison Krauss, Billie Joe Armstrong, Bono, Brian Wilson, Norah Jones, Steven Tyler, Stevie Wonder, Tim McGraw & Velvet Revolver)	22	—	—	—		Non-album single
2006	"The Reason Why" (Vince Gill featuring Alison Krauss)	—	28	—	—		These Days
2012	"I Just Come Here for the Music" (Don Williams featuring Alison Krauss)	—	—	—	—		And So It Goes
2014	"Blue Blue Day" (Mandy Barnett featuring Alison Krauss)	—	—	—	—		I Can't Stop Loving You: The Songs of Don Gibson
2016	"Come Find Me" (Alabama featuring Alison Krauss)	—	—	—	—		Southern Drawl
2017	"How I Want To Be" (Sundance Head featuring Alison Krauss)	—	—	—	—		Everything to Lose
2018	"Love Heals" (Levi Hummon featuring Alison Krauss)	—	—	—	—		Non-album single
2023	"Do This Life" (High Valley with Alison Krauss)	—	—	4	—		Way Back
"—" denotes releases that did not chart.

== Other charted songs ==
Year	Single	Peak positions		Album
Year	Single	US Country	US AC	Album
2003	"Coat of Many Colors" (with Shania Twain)	57	—	Just Because I'm a Woman: Songs of Dolly Parton
2005	"Shimmy Down the Chimney"	58	—	Shimmy Down the Chimney: A Country Christmas
2016	"Hard Candy Christmas" (with Cyndi Lauper)	—	27	Detour
"—" denotes releases that did not chart.

== Other appearances ==
Year	Song	Album
2018	"You Oughta Be Here with Me" / "I've Been a Long Time Leaving"	King of the Road: A Tribute to Roger Miller
2018	"The Last Word in Lonesome Is Me" with Dolly Parton	King of the Road: A Tribute to Roger Miller

== Videography ==
=== Music videos ===
Year	Title	Director
1990	"I've Got That Old Feeling"	Joanne Gardner
1991	"Steel Rails"	Joanne Gardner
1992	"Heartstrings"	Joanne Gardner
1992	"New Fool"	Joanne Gardner
1992	"Every Time You Say Goodbye"	R. Brad Murano/Steven T. Miller
1993	"The Angels Cried" (with Alan Jackson)	Tom Calabrese
1994	"Walk Over God's Heaven" (with The Cox Family)	Joanne Gardner
1994	"Teach Your Children" (as The Red Hots)	
1995	"Somewhere in the Vicinity of the Heart" (with Shenandoah)	Steven Goldmann
1995	"When You Say Nothing at All"	Lenny Fiske
1995	"Baby, Now That I've Found You"	Lenny Fiske
1996	"Find My Way Back to My Heart"	Gerry Wenner
1996	"Just When I Needed You Most" (with Dolly Parton)	John Lloyd Miller
1996	"Baby Mine"	Gerry Wenner
1997	"Looking in the Eyes of Love"	Jean Pellerin
1997	"Whenever I Call You Friend" (with Michael Johnson)	Tom Bevins
1998	"I Give You to His Heart"	Jean Pellerin
1998	"Same Old Train" (Various)	Steve Boyle
1998	"Forget About It"	Mary Lambert
1999	"Get Me Through December" (with Natalie MacMaster)	Mark Hesselink
2000	"Maybe"	Rocky Schenck
2001	"The Lucky One"	Rocky Schenck
2001	"I'll Fly Away" (with Gillian Welch)	Joel Coen
2001	"Let Me Touch You for a While"	Rocky Schenck
2002	"Sitting in the Window of My Room"	Rocky Schenck
2002	"New Favorite"	Rocky Schenck
2003	"How's the World Treating You" (with James Taylor)	Lawrence Draper
2003	"Every Time You Say Goodbye" (live)	Michael McNamara
2004	"You Will Be My Ain True Love" (with Sting)	Miramax Films
2004	"Whiskey Lullaby" (with Brad Paisley)	Rick Schroder
2004	"Restless"	Rocky Schenck
2005	"Goodbye Is All We Have"	Rocky Schenck
2006	"If I Didn't Know Any Better"	Wayne Isham
2007	"Missing You" (with John Waite)	Rocky Schenck
2007	"Simple Love"	Michael McNamara
2007	"Gone, Gone, Gone (Done Moved On)" (with Robert Plant)	Rocky Schenck
2008	"Please Read the Letter" (with Robert Plant)	Rocky Schenck
2011	"Paper Airplane"	Randee St. Nicholas
