= Now That I've Found You: A Collection =

Compilation album by Alison Krauss
- Released: February 7, 1995
- Genre: Bluegrass, country
- Length: 42:31
- Label: Rounder
- Producer: Alison Krauss & Union Station

Alison Krauss chronology
I Know Who Holds Tomorrow (1994)	Now That I've Found You: A Collection (1995)	So Long So Wrong (1997)

Singles from Now That I've Found You: A Collection
- 1. "When You Say Nothing At All" Released: January 1995; 2. "Baby, Now That I've Found You" Released: July 18, 1995; 3. "Oh, Atlanta" Released: 1995

Professional ratings
Review scores
Source	Rating
AllMusic	5/5 stars
Robert Christgau	A−
Rolling Stone	4/5 stars

Now That I've Found You: A Collection is an album by Alison Krauss, released in 1995. It is a retrospective of the early part of Krauss' recording career. It includes songs that appeared on her solo albums, albums by Alison Krauss & Union Station, and some that appeared on an album by Alison Krauss & the Cox Family. It also contains some new material, including a cover version of "Oh, Atlanta," originally recorded by Bad Company in 1979.

The album features the hit country single "When You Say Nothing at All" and sold over two million copies, earning double platinum RIAA certification. The title single "Baby, Now That I've Found You" won the Grammy Award for Best Female Country Vocal Performance and "When You Say Nothing at All" was named Single of the Year by the Country Music Association. The latter organization had originally nominated it in the category of Album of the Year, but withdrew the nomination in favor of Patty Loveless' When Fallen Angels Fly. This was because the Country Music Association determined that Now That I've Found You: A Collection did not meet the nomination's criterion for consisting of at least 60 percent original material.

== Track listing ==
1. "Baby, Now That I've Found You" (Tony Macaulay, John MacLeod) – 3:49
  - (Previously Unreleased)
2. "Oh, Atlanta" (Mick Ralphs) – 4:41
  - (Previously Unreleased)
3. "Broadway" (Sidney & Suzanne Cox) – 3:57
  - (Previously Unreleased)
4. "Every Time You Say Goodbye" (John Pennell) – 3:13
  - (From the Album Every Time You Say Goodbye by Alison Krauss & Union Station)
5. "Tonight I'll Be Lonely Too" (Sidney Cox) – 3:25
  - (From the Album I've Got That Old Feeling by Alison Krauss)
6. "Teardrops Will Kiss the Morning Dew" (Paul Craft) – 3:38
  - (From the Album Two Highways by Alison Krauss & Union Station)
7. "Sleep On" (Nelson Mandrell) – 2:23
  - (From the Album Too Late to Cry by Alison Krauss)
8. "When God Dips His Pen of Love in My Heart" (Cleavant Derricks) – 2:26
  - (From the Album Everybody's Reaching Out for Someone by The Cox Family)
9. "I Will" (John Lennon, Paul McCartney) – 4:04
  - (From the Album Within Reach by Tony Furtado)
10. "I Don't Believe You've Met My Baby" (Autry Inman) – 3:10
  - (From the Album Slide Rule by Jerry Douglas)
11. "In the Palm of Your Hand" (Ron Block) – 3:24
  - (From the Album I Know Who Holds Tomorrow by Alison Krauss & The Cox Family)
12. "When You Say Nothing at All" (Paul Overstreet, Don Schlitz) – 4:21
  - (From the Album Keith Whitley: A Tribute Album performed by Alison Krauss & Union Station)

== Personnel ==
- Alison Krauss - vocals, fiddle, viola
- Ron Block - vocals, acoustic and electric guitars, banjo
- Russ Barenberg, Mike Marshall, Scott Nygaard, Tim Stafford - guitars
- Jerry Douglas - guitars, dobro
- Sam Bush, Brent Truitt - mandolin
- Stuart Duncan - fiddle, harmonica, cymbals
- Adam Steffey - mandolin, mandola
- Pete Wasner - piano

== Charts ==
=== Weekly charts ===
Chart (1995)	Peak position
Canadian Country Albums (RPM)	1
US Billboard 200	13
US Top Country Albums (Billboard)	2

=== Year-end charts ===
Chart (1995)	Position
US Billboard 200	53
US Top Country Albums (Billboard)	6

Chart (1996)	Position
US Billboard 200	196
US Top Country Albums (Billboard)	22

== Certifications and sales ==
Region	Certification	Certified units/sales
Canada (Music Canada)	Gold	50,000^{^}
United Kingdom (BPI)	Silver	60,000^{^}
United States (RIAA)	2× Platinum	2,000,000^{^}
^{^} Shipments figures based on certification alone.
