= 1995 Country Music Association Awards =

Annual US music awards ceremony

- Date: October 4, 1995
- Location: Grand Ole Opry House, Nashville, Tennessee
- Hosted by: Vince Gill
- Most wins: Alison Krauss (4)
- Most nominations: Alan Jackson (6)

Television/radio coverage
- Network: CBS

The 1995 Country Music Association Awards, 29th Ceremony, was held on October 4, 1995 at the Grand Ole Opry House, Nashville, Tennessee, and was hosted by CMA Award Winner, Vince Gill.

== Winners and Nominees ==
Winner are in Bold.

Entertainer of the Year	Album of the Year
**Alan Jackson**; Brooks & Dunn; Garth Brooks; Reba McEntire; Vince Gill	**When Fallen Angels Fly — Patty Loveless**; John Michael Montgomery — John Michael Montgomery; Lead On — George Strait; When Love Finds You — Vince Gill; Who Am I — Alan Jackson
Male Vocalist of the Year	Female Vocalist of the Year
**Vince Gill**; John Berry; Alan Jackson; John Michael Montgomery; George Strait	**Alison Krauss**; Mary Chapin Carpenter; Patty Loveless; Reba McEntire; Pam Tillis
Vocal Group of the Year	Vocal Duo of the Year
**The Mavericks**; BlackHawk; Diamond Rio; Sawyer Brown; Shenandoah	**Brooks & Dunn**; Bellamy Brothers; Brother Phelps; Sweethearts of the Rodeo; John & Audrey Wiggins
Single of the Year	Song of the Year
**"When You Say Nothing At All" — Alison Krauss & Union Station**; "Any Man Of Mine" — Shania Twain; "Baby Likes To Rock It" — The Tractors; "Gone Country" — Alan Jackson; "Keeper Of The Stars" — Tracy Byrd	**"Independence Day" — Gretchen Peters**; "Don't Take The Girl" — Craig Martin and Larry Johnson; "Gone Country" — Bob McDill; "How Can I Help You Say Goodbye"— Karen Taylor—Good and Burton Banks Collins; "Thinkin' Problem" — David Ball, Allen Shamblin, and Stuart Ziff
Horizon Award	Musician of the Year
**Alison Krauss**; David Ball; John Berry; Faith Hill; Shania Twain	**Mark O'Connor**; Eddie Bayers; Paul Franklin; Brent Mason; Matt Rollings
Music Video of the Year	Vocal Event of the Year
**"Baby Likes To Rock It" — The Tractors**; "Any Man Of Mine" — Shania Twain; "I Don't Even Know Your Name" — Alan Jackson; "The Red Strokes" — Garth Brooks; "When Love Finds You" — Vince Gill	**Somewhere In The Vicinity of the Heart — Alison Krauss and Shenandoah**; A Good Year For The Roses — George Jones and Alan Jackson; One — George Jones and Tammy Wynette; Sorry Seems To Be The Hardest Word — Suzy Bogguss and Chet Atkins; Workin' Man Blues — Lee Roy Parnell, Steve Wariner and Diamond Rio

== Hall of Fame ==
Country Music Hall Of Fame Inductees
- Roger Miller
- Jo Walker—Meador
