= Essential Alison Krauss =

Greatest hits album by Alison Krauss
- Released: July 21, 2009
- Genre: Bluegrass, country
- Length: 48:23
- Label: Decca
- Producer: Various original producers

Alison Krauss chronology
Raising Sand (2007)	Essential Alison Krauss (2009)	Paper Airplane (2011)

Professional ratings
Review scores
Source	Rating
Allmusic	3.5/5 stars

Essential Alison Krauss is the first official greatest hits album by American country music and bluegrass music artist Alison Krauss. The album, which was released on July 7, 2009, was only released outside North America. It was issued by Decca Records UK. The album is composed of songs that Krauss handpicked herself.

== Track listing ==
1. "Simple Love" (Sarah Siskind) — 4:44
2. "Sister Rosetta Goes Before Us" (Sam Phillips) — 3:23
3. "Let Me Touch You For a While" (Robert Lee Castleman) — 3:20
4. "The Lucky One" (Castleman) — 3:10
5. "So Long, So Wrong" (Patrick Brayer, Walden Dahl) — 3:26
6. "Empty Hearts" (Michael Johnson, Michael McDonald) — 3:23
7. "Every Time You Say Goodbye" (John Pennell) — 3:16
8. "Wish I Still Had You" (Sidney Cox) — 4:58
  - live version
9. "Broadway" (Cox, Suzanne Cox) — 3:58
10. "Baby, Now That I've Found You" (Tony Macaulay, John MacLeod) — 3:54
  - live version
11. "Sawing on the Strings" (Lewis Compton) — 3:02
12. "Restless" (Castleman) — 2:57
13. "When You Say Nothing at All" (Paul Overstreet, Don Schlitz) — 3:53
  - live version
14. "A Living Prayer" (Ron Block) — 3:35

== Chart performance ==
Chart (2009)	Peak position
New Zealand Albums Charts	25
Swedish Albums Chart	37
UK Albums Chart	13

== Certifications and sales ==
Region	Certification	Certified units/sales
United Kingdom (BPI)	Silver	60,000^{*}
^{*} Sales figures based on certification alone.
