= Arcadia (Alison Krauss & Union Station album) =

Studio album by Alison Krauss & Union Station
- Released: March 28, 2025
- Length: 35:52
- Label: Down the Road
- Producers: Alison Krauss & Union Station

Alison Krauss & Union Station chronology
| Paper Airplane (2011) | Arcadia (2025) |

Alison Krauss chronology
| Raise the Roof (2021) | Arcadia (2025) |

Singles from Arcadia
- 1. "Looks Like the End of the Road" Released: January 29, 2025; 2. "Granite Mills" Released: February 28, 2025

Arcadia is the eighth studio album by American bluegrass band Alison Krauss & Union Station. It was released on March 28, 2025, through Down the Road Records, and is the band's first album in fourteen years, following 2011's Paper Airplane, and is Alison Krauss' first album since Raise the Roof, her 2021 collaboration with Robert Plant. It is the band's final project to feature Dan Tyminski and their first to feature new member Russell Moore. It was produced by the band and was preceded by the singles "Looks Like the End of the Road" and "Granite Mills".

== Background ==
During an interview on the podcast Toy Heart with Tom Power, Krauss announced a new album with Union Station would be released in 2025. The album, Arcadia, was officially announced on January 29 and released on March 28, 2025, via Down the Road records. Russell Moore joins the band for this album and subsequent tour, replacing longtime member Dan Tyminski, who was unable to participate due to scheduling conflicts, though one of his songs is covered on the project. In a statement regarding the album, Krauss explained "the stories of the past are told in this music. It's that whole idea of 'in the good old days when times were bad.' There's so much bravery and valor and loyalty and dreaming, of family and themes of human existence that were told in a certain way when our grandparents were alive. Someone asked me, 'How do you sing these tragic tunes? I have to. It's a calling. I feel privileged to be a messenger of somebody else's story. And I want to hear what happened." Krauss also revealed that "Looks Like the End of the Road", the album's first single which was released alongside the announcement, was the first track she found, which then made the rest of the record "fall into place", noting that the song "felt so alive, I could hear the guys already playing it."

"Granite Mills", the album's second single, features new member Moore on vocals. Discussing the track, Krauss explained "Jerry, Ron, Barry and I all met when Dan Tyminski left the band, and Jerry asked me, 'What do you think?' I said, 'Russell Moore,' and they all said, 'Absolutely!' I couldn't believe it when we went into the studio and his voice came through the speakers. He just stands there and sings with his hands in his pockets, and he kills it. The first song he did was 'Granite Mills' and about 10 minutes in, Ron was covering his mouth because he started giggling. Russell came in and inspired us all."

== Promotion ==
Willie Watson was announced as support on all 73 dates of the band's five-month 2025 North American tour, kicking off April 25 in Atlanta, Georgia and concluding in Davie, Florida on September 28. Stuart Duncan also joins the band for their 2025 tour as a fiddle player.

== Critical reception ==
Arcadia received universal acclaim from music critics. At Metacritic, which assigns a normalized rating out of 100 to reviews from mainstream critics, the album has an average score of 84 based on 9 reviews, indicating "universal acclaim".

In a four star review for The Guardian, Kitty Empire stated "the bluegrass star and band reconvene with a new co-vocalist on this slick yet understated set drawing on old-time roots and more recent concerns", praising the production, Krauss and Moore's vocals, and the subject matter of the selected songs.

== Track listing ==
| No. | Title | Writer(s) | Length |
|---|---|---|---|
| 1. | "Looks Like the End of the Road" | Jeremy Lister | 3:39 |
| 2. | "The Hangman" | Viktor Krauss; Maurice Ogden | 3:37 |
| 3. | "The Wrong Way" | Robert Lee Castleman; Dan Tyminski | 3:35 |
| 4. | "Granite Mills" | Tim Eriksen | 3:40 |
| 5. | "One Ray of Shine" | V. Krauss; Sarah Siskind | 4:03 |
| 6. | "Richmond on the James" | G. T. Burgess; Alison Krauss | 3:27 |
| 7. | "North Side Gal" | JD McPherson | 2:36 |
| 8. | "Forever" | Castleman | 3:39 |
| 9. | "Snow" | Bob Lucas | 3:23 |
| 10. | "There's a Light Up Ahead" | Lister | 4:13 |
| Total length: | | | 35:52 |

== Personnel ==
=== Alison Krauss & Union Station ===
- Alison Krauss – lead vocals, fiddle, harmony vocals, strings, production
- Barry Bales – upright bass, production (all tracks); tenor vocals (tracks 1–6, 8–10), bass vocals (7)
- Jerry Douglas – Dobro, lap steel guitar, production
- Ron Block – acoustic guitar, banjo, production (all tracks); tenor vocals (7)
- Russell Moore – lead vocals, baritone vocals, production

=== Additional contributors ===
- Brad Blackwood – mastering
- Gary Paczosa – mixing
- Dan Tyminski – acoustic guitar (all tracks), mandolin (tracks 1–4, 7–10)
- Viktor Krauss – piano
- Jeff Taylor – accordion (track 1)
- Adam Steffey – mandolin (tracks 5, 6)
- Stuart Duncan – fiddle (track 7)

== Charts ==
Chart performance for Arcadia
| Chart (2025) | Peak position |
|---|---|
| Dutch Albums (Album Top 100) | 92 |
| German Albums (Offizielle Top 100) | 56 |
| Scottish Albums (Official Charts) | 13 |
| Swiss Albums (Schweizer Hitparade) | 41 |
| UK Album Downloads (Official Charts) | 7 |
| UK Americana Albums (Official Charts) | 4 |
| UK Country Albums (Official Charts) | 1 |
| UK Independent Albums (Official Charts) | 6 |
| US Billboard 200 | 156 |
| US Independent Albums (Billboard) | 23 |
| US Top Bluegrass Albums (Billboard) | 1 |
| US Top Country Albums (Billboard) | 29 |
