= Paper Airplane (album) =

Studio album by Alison Krauss & Union Station
- Released: April 12, 2011
- Studio: Blackbird (Nashville, Tennessee); House of Blues (Nashville, Tennessee); Sound Emporium (Nashville, Tennessee)
- Genre: Bluegrass
- Length: 43:15
- Label: Rounder
- Producer: Alison Krauss & Union Station

Alison Krauss chronology
Essential Alison Krauss (2009)	Paper Airplane (2011)	Windy City (2017)

Singles from Paper Airplane
- 1. "Paper Airplane" Released: March 28, 2011; 2. "My Love Follows You Where You Go" Released: January 2012

Paper Airplane is the seventh album by Alison Krauss and Union Station. Released on April 12, 2011, it was Krauss's 14th album and her first release with Union Station since Lonely Runs Both Ways in 2004. It includes cover versions of "My Opening Farewell" and "Dimming of the Day", originally recorded by Jackson Browne and Richard Thompson, respectively.

The album's lead single, the title track, was released to country music radio and Adult album alternative radio on March 28, 2011, but failed to chart.

The album was engineered and mixed by Mike Shipley, whom Krauss persuaded to return to engineering after a 10‑year absence.

== Reception ==
=== Critical ===
Professional ratings
Review scores
Source	Rating
AllMusic	4/5 stars
Rolling Stone	3.5/5 stars

Thom Jurek of AllMusic described the album as melancholy, with songs revolving around themes of trial and perseverance. He also praised the cover versions of "Dimming of the Day" and "My Opening Farewell". He considered the album "polished yet authentic".

Andrew Greer of Christianity Today also honored Paper Airplane with four stars, finding it "an exquisite eleven-song canon," and added: "Though their haunts are heavy-hearted, a tangible hope pervades Airplane, attesting to the band's spiritual sensitivity even without the band's usual faith song standout." The album won Grammys for Best Bluegrass Album and Best Engineered Album, Non-Classical.

=== Commercial ===
Paper Airplane sold approximately 83,000 copies during its first week of release, making it Krauss's first number one album on the Billboard Top Country Albums chart. It is also the highest entry for Krauss on the Billboard 200, where it debuted at number three. Raising Sand, Krauss's collaboration with Robert Plant, reached number two on the Billboard 200 upon its release in 2007. In addition to these charts, it also debuted at number one on the Billboard Top Bluegrass Albums and number one on Billboard Folk Albums. The album has sold 384,000 copies in the United States as of November 2016.

Paper Airplane was a minor hit in Europe, debuting in the top forty of several European countries, such as the Norwegian Albums Chart. It became Krauss' most successful album in the UK, reaching number 11 on the UK Albums Chart (overtaking 2009's compilation Essential Alison Krauss, which reached number 13) and earning a silver certification from the BPI.

== Track listing ==
No.	Title	Writer(s)	Length
1.	"Paper Airplane"	Robert Lee Castleman	3:36
2.	"Dust Bowl Children"	Peter Rowan	3:06
3.	"Lie Awake"	Angel Snow; Viktor Krauss	3:55
4.	"Lay My Burden Down"	Aoife O'Donovan	3:52
5.	"My Love Follows You Where You Go"	Lori McKenna; Barry Dean; Liz Rose	4:03
6.	"Dimming of the Day"	Richard Thompson	5:20
7.	"On the Outside Looking In"	Tim O'Brien	3:35
8.	"Miles to Go"	Barry Bales; Chris Stapleton	2:54
9.	"Sinking Stone"	Jeremy Lister	4:42
10.	"Bonita and Bill Butler"	Sidney Cox	4:03
11.	"My Opening Farewell"	Jackson Browne	4:08
Total length:			43:15

Target bonus tracks
No.	Title	Length
12.	"These Days" (also an iTunes pre-order bonus track)
13.	"A Place Outside"
14.	"Frozen Fields"
15.	"We Hide & Seek" (live)
16.	"Faraway Land" (live)
17.	"Every Time You Say Goodbye" (live)

== Personnel ==
=== Alison Krauss & Union Station ===
- Alison Krauss – fiddles, lead and harmony vocals, production
- Barry Bales – acoustic bass, harmony vocals, production
- Jerry Douglas – Dobro, lap steel, harmony vocals, production
- Ron Block – banjo, guitar, production
- Dan Tyminski – guitar, mandolin, lead and harmony vocals, production

=== Additional contributors ===
- Mike Shipley – engineering, mixing
- Brad Blackwood – mastering
- Neal Cappellino – additional engineering, editing
- Brian Wohlgemuth – production and mixing assistance
- Ted Wheeler – engineering assistance
- Tom Freitag – engineering assistance
- Kyle Ford – engineering assistance
- Randee St. Nicholas – photography
- Meat and Potatoes – art direction, design

== Charts ==
=== Weekly charts ===
Chart (2011)	Peak position
Canadian Albums (Billboard)	23
Danish Albums (Hitlisten)	39
Dutch Albums (Album Top 100)	49
German Albums (Offizielle Top 100)	51
Irish Albums (IRMA)	28
New Zealand Albums (RMNZ)	32
Norwegian Albums (VG-lista)	4
Scottish Albums (OCC)	7
Swedish Albums (Sverigetopplistan)	10
UK Albums (OCC)	11
UK Country Albums (OCC)	1
US Billboard 200	3
US Top Bluegrass Albums (Billboard)	1
US Top Country Albums (Billboard)	1
US Americana/Folk Albums (Billboard)	1

=== Year-end charts ===
Chart (2011)	Position
US Billboard 200	111
US Top Bluegrass Albums (Billboard)	1
US Top Country Albums (Billboard)	24
US Folk Albums (Billboard)	2

Chart (2012)	Position
US Top Bluegrass Albums (Billboard)	4
US Folk Albums (Billboard)	21

== Certifications and sales ==
Region	Certification	Certified units/sales
United Kingdom (BPI)	Silver	60,000^{*}
^{*} Sales figures based on certification alone.
