= The Hangman (poem) =

Poem by Maurice Ogden

- by Maurice Ogden
- Original title: Ballad of the Hangman
- First published in: Masses & Mainstream (1951)
- Subject(s): Moral responsibility, oppression, bystander apathy
- Genre(s): Horror, death

"The Hangman" is a poem written by Maurice Ogden in 1951 and first published in 1954. The poem was originally published under the title "Ballad of the Hangman" in Masses & Mainstream magazine under the pseudonym "Jack Denoya", before later being "[r]evised and retitled". Its plot concerns a hangman who arrives in a town and executes the citizens one by one. As each citizen is executed, the others are afraid to object out of fear that they will be next. Finally, there is nobody remaining in the town except the hangman and the narrator of the poem. The narrator is then executed by the hangman, as by then there is no one left who will defend him.

The poem was adapted into an 11-minute animated film in 1964 which received an award at the 1964 Locarno International Film Festival. The poem is used in education material on topics about the Holocaust and the bystander effect.

== Background and analysis ==
The poem was written as a commentary during the McCarthy era. Ogden was an actor and writer who was denied work and persecuted during the McCarthy era for allegedly having been a member of the Communist Party many years earlier

The poem is usually cited as an indictment of those who stand idly by while others commit grave evil or injustice, such as during the Holocaust. The story it tells is very similar to that of the famous statement First They Came that has been attributed to the anti-Nazi pastor Martin Niemöller as early as 1946. However, Steve Goldman, whose father Les Goldman produced an animated version of the poem, said

… Though the poem on which the film is based has Holocaust parallels, the poet, Maurice Ogden, was actually writing about America during the McCarthy era. Ogden was an actor and writer who was denied work and persecuted by the House Un-American Activities Committee during the 1950's and early 60's for allegedly having been a member of the Communist Party many years earlier.

== Animated film ==
In 1964, an animated 11-minute film was made by Les Goldman and Paul Julian and was narrated by Herschel Bernardi. The film was a co-winner of the Silver Sail award at the Locarno International Film Festival in 1964.

== Legacy ==
Ogden's poem was set to music by Alison Krauss & Union Station and is the second song in their 2025 album Arcadia.

The poem is often used in educational resources, using it to explore bystander behavior and the challenges of speaking up against injustice.

== See also ==
- No Pasarán
- "Not My Business"
