= I Know Who Holds Tomorrow =

Studio album by Alison Krauss & The Cox Family
- Released: 1994
- Recorded: Nightingale, Nashville, TN
- Genre: Bluegrass, country, gospel
- Length: 40:08
- Label: Rounder
- Producer: Alison Krauss

Alison Krauss chronology
Every Time You Say Goodbye (1992)	I Know Who Holds Tomorrow (1994)	Now That I've Found You: A Collection (1995)

Professional ratings
Review scores
Source	Rating
AllMusic	3/5 stars

I Know Who Holds Tomorrow is an album by American violinist/singer Alison Krauss and the Cox Family, released in 1994.

At the Grammy Awards of 1995, I Know Who Holds Tomorrow won the Grammy Award for Best Southern, Country or Bluegrass Gospel Album.

== Track listing ==
1. "Walk Over God's Heaven" (Thomas A. Dorsey) – 2:57
2. "Will There Be Any Stars" (Traditional) – 3:12
3. "Where No One Stands Alone" (Merle Haggard, Mosie Lister) – 3:00
4. "Never Will Give Up" (David Marshall) – 3:42
5. "Remind Me Dear Lord" (Traditional, Dottie Rambo) – 3:25
6. "I Know Who Holds Tomorrow" (Ira Stanphill) – 5:03
7. "Everybody Wants to Go to Heaven" (Loretta Lynn) – 2:47
8. "I'd Rather Have Jesus" (George Beverly Shea, Rhea F. Miller) – 3:17
9. "Far Side Bank of Jordan" (Terry Smith) – 3:22
10. "In the Palm of Your Hand" (Ron Block) – 3:24
11. "Loves Me Like a Rock" (Paul Simon) – 3:03
12. "Jewels" (George F. Root, William Cushing) – 2:56

== Personnel ==
- Alison Krauss – fiddle, vocals
- Ron Block – banjo, guitar, vocals
- Barry Bales – bass, vocals
- Suzanne Cox – vocals
- Evelyn Cox – vocals
- Rob Ickes – dobro
- Viktor Krauss – bass
- Lynn Cox – vocals
- Kenny Malone – drums
- Kayton Roberts – steel guitar
- Sidney Cox – vocals
- Gary W. Smith – piano
- Adam Steffey – mandolin
- Willard Cox – vocals
- Andrea Zonn – fiddle

== Chart positions ==
Year	Chart	Position
1995	Billboard Contemporary Christian Albums	32
