= Dimming of the Day =

Song by Richard and Linda Thompson

from the album Pour Down Like Silver
- Released: November 1975
- Recorded: 1975
- Studio: Sound Techniques, London
- Genre: British folk rock
- Length: 7:16
- Label: Island
- Songwriter: Richard Thompson
- Producers: Richard Thompson and John Wood

Official audio
- "Dimming of the Day" on YouTube

"Dimming of the Day" is a song written by Richard Thompson and performed with his then-wife Linda Thompson on their 1975 album Pour Down Like Silver. Thompson recorded an acoustic version for his 1996 solo album Acoustic Classics.

== Covers ==
'Dimming of the Day' has been covered by many artists over the years, including:

- Mary Black, on her 1991 album Babes In The Wood
- Bonnie Raitt, on her 1994 album Longing in Their Hearts
- The Blind Boys of Alabama, on the 1994 tribute album Beat the Retreat – Songs by Richard Thompson
- Emmylou Harris, on her 1996 box set Portraits
- Mary Elizabeth Mastrantonio in John Sayles’ 1999 film Limbo
- The Neville Brothers, on their 1999 album Valence Street
- David Gilmour, who performed the song at his 2002 semi‑acoustic Royal Festival Hall concerts, released on the David Gilmour in Concert DVD
- The Dutch musician Gerard van Maasakkers, who recorded a Brabantian‑language version, ‘As ’t Dalijk Donker Is’, on his 2007 album Zicht
- The Corrs, on their 2005 album Home
- Alison Krauss & Union Station, on their 2011 album Paper Airplane
- Tom Jones, on his 2012 album Spirit in the Room
- Alfie Boe, on his 2013 album Trust, featuring Shawn Colvin
- A duet version on the 2011 debut album of singer‑actress Anastasia Barzee, which takes the song’s title

== See also ==
- The Dawning of the Day
