= Forget About It =

Studio album by Alison Krauss
- Released: August 3, 1999
- Recorded: 1999
- Studio: Emerald Sound Studios and Seventeen Grand Recording, Nashville, Tennessee
- Genre: Bluegrass, country, adult contemporary
- Length: 40:13
- Label: Rounder
- Producer: Alison Krauss & Union Station

Alison Krauss chronology
So Long So Wrong (1997)	Forget About It (1999)	New Favorite (2001)

Professional ratings
Review scores
Source	Rating
AllMusic	3/5 stars
The Encyclopedia of Popular Music	4/5 stars
Rolling Stone	3/5 stars

Forget About It is the third solo studio album by Alison Krauss, released in 1999. It reached number 5 on the Billboard Country Albums chart. The lead single, "Forget About It", peaked at number 67 on the Country Singles Chart, and "Stay" reached number 28 on the Adult Contemporary chart.

== Critical reception ==
Country Standard Time wrote that "despite the prominence of dobro and mandolin here, it's obvious that Krauss is a pop star more than anything else."

== Track listing ==
1. "Stay" (Larry Byrom, Allyson Taylor) – 3:25
2. "Forget About It" (Robert Lee Castleman) – 3:30
3. "It Wouldn't Have Made Any Difference" (Todd Rundgren)– 4:28
4. "Maybe" (Gordon Kennedy, Phil Madeira) – 3:47
5. "Empty Hearts" (Michael McDonald, Michael Johnson) – 3:24
6. "Never Got Off the Ground" (Danny O'Keefe) – 3:40
7. "Ghost in This House" (Hugh Prestwood) – 4:04
8. "It Don't Matter Now" (Michael McDonald) – 2:50
9. "That Kind of Love" (Pat Bergeson, Michael McDonald) – 3:43
10. "Could You Lie" (Ron Block) – 2:54
11. "Dreaming My Dreams with You" (Allen Reynolds) – 4:28 (featuring Dolly Parton and Lyle Lovett)

== Personnel ==
- Alison Krauss – fiddle, vocals, harmony vocals
- Viktor Krauss – bass
- Barry Bales – bass, harmony vocals
- Jim Keltner – drums
- Kenny Malone – drums
- Pat Bergeson – guitar
- Ron Block – guitar, harmony vocals
- Sam Bush – mandolin, slide mandolin, harmony vocals
- Lyle Lovett – harmony vocals on "Dreaming My Dreams With You"
- Evelyn Cox – harmony vocals
- Sidney Cox – harmony vocals
- Suzanne Cox – harmony vocals
- Dolly Parton – harmony vocals on "Dreaming My Dreams With You"
- Jerry Douglas – Dobro, lap steel guitar
- Joey Miskulin – accordion
- Matt Rollings – piano
- Dan Tyminski – guitar, harmony vocals

Production notes:

- Gary Paczosa – engineer, mixing
- Doug Sax – mastering
- Sandy Jenkins – engineer, assistant engineer
- Thomas "Snake" Johnson – engineer, assistant engineer
- Tim Waters – assistant engineer
- Chuck Turner – digital editing
- Tracy Martinson – digital editing
- Matthew Barnes – photography
- Nancy Given – art direction, design

== Chart performance ==
=== Weekly charts ===
Chart (1999)	Peak position
Canadian Country Albums (RPM)	5
US Billboard 200	60
US Top Country Albums (Billboard)	5

=== Year-end charts ===
Chart (1999)	Position
US Top Country Albums (Billboard)	62
Chart (2000)	Position
US Top Country Albums (Billboard)	53

== Certifications ==
Region	Certification	Certified units/sales
United States (RIAA)	Gold	500,000^{^}
^{^} Shipments figures based on certification alone.
