= Brad Blackwood =

American audio mastering engineer

Brad Blackwood is an American audio mastering engineer. He has mastered albums for artists such as Maroon 5, Against Me!, Lamb of God, Black Eyed Peas, Sara Bareilles, and is an 22 time Grammy nominee and 3-time winner, as well as having multiple nominations and awards including Latin Grammy, Pensado Awards, Juno Awards and Dove Awards. He opened Euphonic Masters, his personal mastering room in Memphis, Tennessee in 2003. He is a graduate of Full Sail University (Recording Arts, 1996).

== Work ==
=== Grammy awards ===
Year	Nominee / work	Award	Result
1999	Choose Life	Best Rock Gospel Album	Nominated
2000	Amplifier	Best Rock Gospel Album	Nominated
2001	Shake Hands with Shorty	Best Contemporary Blues Album	Nominated
2001	Third Verse	Best Rock Gospel Album	Nominated
2001	Big Tent Revival Live	Best Rock Gospel Album	Nominated
2002	Down in the Alley	Best Traditional Blues Album	Nominated
2010	"Misery"	Best Pop Performance By A Duo Or Group With Vocals	Nominated
2011	"Moves like Jagger"	Best Pop Duo/Group Performance	Nominated
2011	Paper Airplane	Best Bluegrass Album	Won
2011	Paper Airplane	Best Engineered Album, Non-Classical	Won
2012	"When Mercy Found Me"	Best Contemporary Christian Music Song	Nominated
2012	Hambone’s Meditations	Best Folk Album	Nominated
2013	"Brave"	Best Pop Solo Performance	Nominated
2014	Shine for All the People	Best Roots Gospel Album	Won
2015	"512"	Best Metal Performance	Nominated
2016	Blues & Ballads (A Folksinger’s Songbook)	Best Traditional Blues Album	Nominated
2019	Deeper Roots: Where the Bluegrass Grows	Best Roots Gospel Album	Nominated
2022	"Distance"	Best Rock Song	Nominated
2025	Diamonds and Pearls	Best Historical Album	Nominated
2026	"Richmond on the James"	Best American Roots Performance	Nominated
2026	Arcadia	Best Bluegrass Album	Nominated
2026	Arcadia	Best Engineered Album, Non-Classical	Nominated
