= Alison Krauss & Union Station =

American bluegrass band

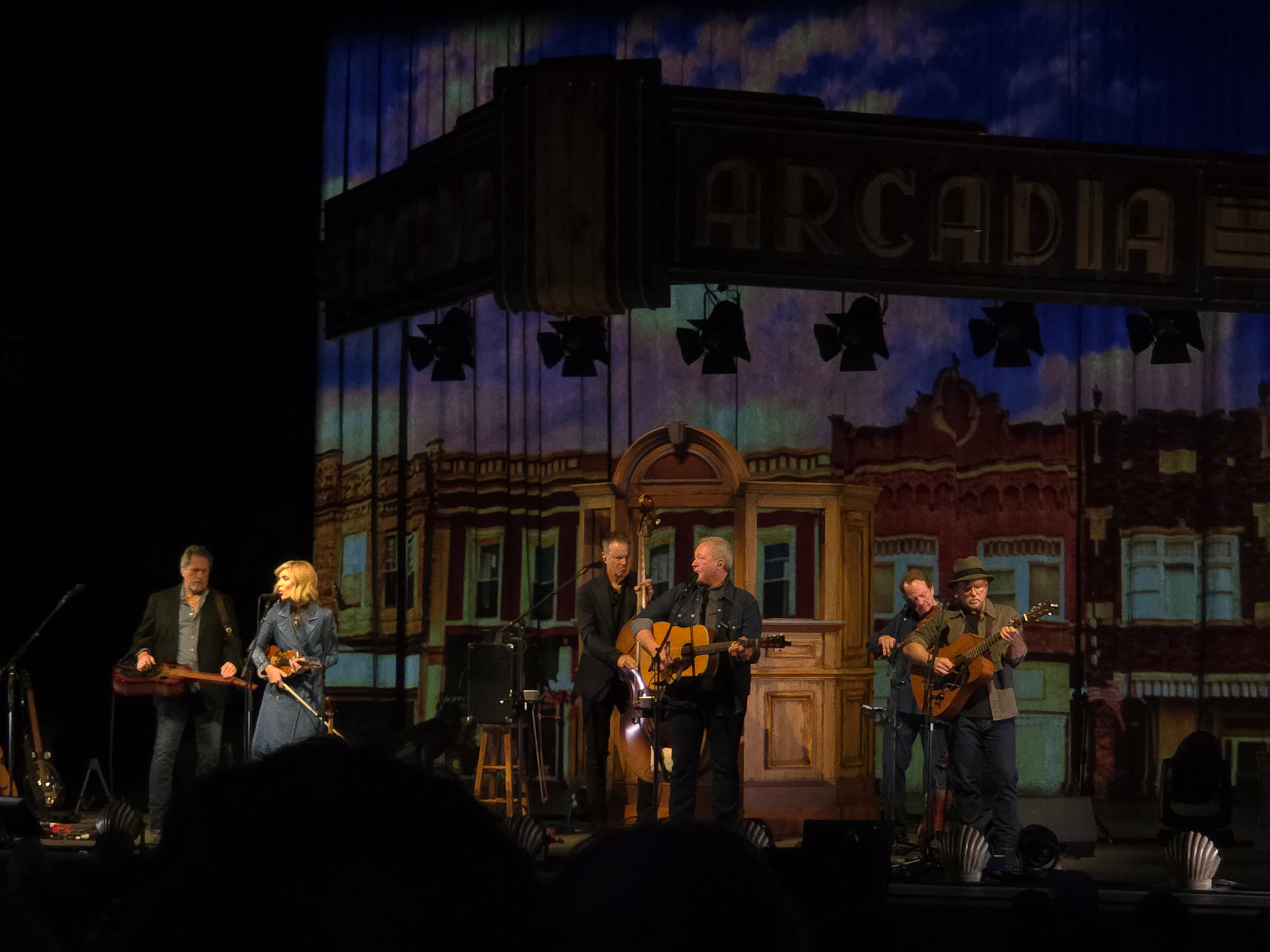
- Alison Krauss and Union Station performing at the Greek Theatre in July 2025

Background information
- Origin: Nashville, Tennessee, U.S.
- Genres: Bluegrass, country
- Years active: 1987–present
- Label: Rounder
- Members: Alison Krauss; Russell Moore; Ron Block; Barry Bales; Jerry Douglas; Larry Atamanuik
- Past members: Alison Brown; Tim Stafford; Adam Steffey; Jeff White; Dan Tyminski; John Pennell; Mike Harman

Alison Krauss & Union Station is an American bluegrass and country band associated with singer Alison Krauss. It was initially composed of Krauss, Jeff White, Mike Harman and John Pennell. Later additions included Alison Brown, Tim Stafford, Ron Block, Adam Steffey, Barry Bales and Larry Atamanuik. In 1992, Stafford was replaced by guitar and mandolin player Dan Tyminski and in 1998, Steffey left and was replaced by Dobro player Jerry Douglas.

== Career ==
Alison Krauss had signed to Rounder Records, and at age 16 released her 1987 debut solo album Too Late to Cry. Soon after, she joined Union Station, with guitarist Jeff White, bassist John Pennell, and banjo player Mike Harman as her backing band. Their debut album in 1989 was Two Highways. Pennell wrote three of the album's 12 songs. It also included the traditional tunes "Wild Bill Jones" and "Beaumont Rag", along with a cover of The Allman Brothers' "Midnight Rider".

Krauss' contract with Rounder Records required her to alternate between releasing a solo album and an album with Union Station. Her second solo album, I've Got That Old Feeling was released in 1990, with Pennell writing three of the album's twelve tracks. By 1992, White, Pennell, and Harman departed from the group, leaving Krauss as its sole original member. Her next Union Station album, Every Time You Say Goodbye, was released that February. The album went on to win her a second Grammy for Best Bluegrass Album of the year. This was the first to feature guitarist Tim Stafford, banjo player Ron Block, mandolinist Adam Steffey, and bassist Barry Bales. Besides Block, who wrote three of the album's 14 tracks, Pennell contributed to its title track.

After Stafford left the band later that year, he was replaced by mandolin and guitar player Dan Tyminski of the Lonesome River Band, who wrote "Another Day, Another Dollar" for Every Time You Say Goodbye. During 1993, Tyminski briefly rejoined the Lonesome River Band and was briefly replaced by John R. Bowman who toured with Union Station until 1994, when Tyminski returned as a permanent member.

So Long So Wrong, Union Station's next album, was released in 1997 and won the Grammy Award for Best Bluegrass Album. George Graham said its sound was "rather untraditional" and "likely [to] change quite a few ... minds about bluegrass". Included on the album is the track "It Doesn't Matter", which was featured in the second season premiere episode of Buffy the Vampire Slayer and was included on the Buffy soundtrack in 1999.

Adam Steffey left Union Station in 1998, and was replaced by renowned Dobro player Jerry Douglas, who had been playing on the solo and band albums from Too Late To Cry onwards.

Their next album, New Favorite, was released on August 14, 2001. The album went on to win the Grammy for Best Bluegrass Album, with the single "The Lucky One" winning a Grammy as well. Lonely Runs Both Ways was released in 2004, and eventually became another Alison Krauss & Union Station gold certified album. Ron Block described Lonely Runs Both Ways as "pretty much... what we've always done" in terms of song selection and the style, in which those songs were recorded. Krauss believes the group "was probably the most unprepared we've ever been" for the album and that songs were chosen as needed rather than planned.

Returning with Union Station, Krauss released a new album called Paper Airplane on April 12, 2011, the follow-up album to Lonely Runs Both Ways (2004). Mike Shipley (the engineering mixer) said that it took a lot of time to do the album because of Krauss' non-stop migraines.

In 2014, she and her band Union Station toured with Willie Nelson and Family, with special guests Kacey Musgraves, and The Devil Makes Three.

During an interview on the podcast Toy Heart with Tom Power, Krauss announced a new album with Union Station to be released in 2025. The album, Arcadia, was officially announced on January 29, and was released on March 28, 2025 via Down the Road records. Tyminski left the band around this time, during which Russell Moore of the IIIrd Tyme Out band took over as its fifth guitarist. Willie Watson was announced "as support" on all dates of the five-month 2025 North American tour, kicking off April 25 in Atlanta and continuing through September. Also by this point, Stuart Duncan joined their touring band as their fiddle player.

== Members ==
=== Current members ===
- Alison Krauss – lead vocals, piano, fiddle (1987–present)
- Larry Atamanuik – drums, percussion (1987–present)
- Barry Bales – bass (1990–present)
- Ron Block – guitar, banjo (1991–present)
- Jerry Douglas – dobro (1998–present)
- Russell Moore – vocals, guitar (2025–present)

=== Current live/touring members ===
- Stuart Duncan – fiddle (2025–present)

=== Former members ===
- Dave Denman – vocals, guitar (1987–1992)
- Mike Harman – banjo, vocals (1987–1992)
- John Pennell – bass (1987–1989)
- Jeff White – guitar, vocals (1987–1990)
- Alison Brown – guitar, banjo (1989–1991)
- Viktor Krauss – bass (1989–1990)
- Tim Stafford – guitar, mandolin (1990–1992)
- Adam Steffey – mandolin (1990–1998)
- Dan Tyminski – guitar, mandolin, vocals (1992–1993, 1994–2025)
- John R. Bowman – guitar (1993–1994)

== Discography ==
Studio albums

- Two Highways (1989)
- Every Time You Say Goodbye (1992)
- So Long So Wrong (1997)
- New Favorite (2001)
- Lonely Runs Both Ways (2004)
- Paper Airplane (2011)
- Arcadia (2025)
