= Lonely Runs Both Ways =

Studio album by Alison Krauss & Union Station
- Released: November 23, 2004
- Recorded: 2004
- Studio: 17 Grand (Nashville, Tennessee); Blackbird (Nashville, Tennessee); Minutia (Nashville, Tennessee)
- Genre: Bluegrass
- Length: 47:38
- Label: Rounder
- Producer: Alison Krauss & Union Station

Alison Krauss chronology
Live (2002)	Lonely Runs Both Ways (2004)	A Hundred Miles or More: A Collection (2007)

Professional ratings
Review scores
Source	Rating
AllMusic	link
BBC	(not rated) link
Country Standard Time	(no rating) link
Guardian Unlimited	link
Music Box	link
PopMatters	(not rated) link

Lonely Runs Both Ways is the sixth album by bluegrass music group Alison Krauss & Union Station, released November 23, 2004. The album won the band three Grammy Awards in 2006, including Best Country Performance By a Duo or Group with Vocal for the song "Restless", Best Country Instrumental Performance for "Unionhouse Branch", and Best Country Album. The song "A Living Prayer" was honored with the award for Bluegrass Recorded Song of the Year from the Gospel Music Association.

== Track listing ==
No.	Title	Writer(s)	Length
1.	"Gravity"	Robert Lee Castleman	3:36
2.	"Restless"	Robert Lee Castleman	2:51
3.	"Rain Please Go Away"	Del McCoury	2:29
4.	"Goodbye Is All We Have"	Sarah Siskind	3:53
5.	"Unionhouse Branch"	Jerry Douglas	2:56
6.	"Wouldn't Be So Bad"	David Rawlings, Gillian Welch	3:11
7.	"Pastures of Plenty"	Woody Guthrie	3:45
8.	"Crazy as Me"	Robert Lee Castleman, Melanie Castleman	3:14
9.	"Borderline"	Sidney Cox, Suzanne Cox	3:26
10.	"My Poor Old Heart"	Donna Hughes	3:08
11.	"This Sad Song"	Alison Brown, Alison Krauss	2:21
12.	"Doesn't Have to Be This Way"	Robert Lee Castleman	3:34
13.	"I Don't Have to Live This Way"	Ron Block	2:04
14.	"If I Didn't Know Any Better"	John Scott Sherrill, Mindy Smith	3:48
15.	"A Living Prayer"	Ron Block	3:35

== Personnel ==
- Alison Krauss – lead vocals, fiddle, viola
- Dan Tyminski – lead vocals, background vocals, acoustic guitar, mandolin
- Ron Block – background vocals, acoustic guitar, banjo, slide guitar
- Jerry Douglas – dobro, lap steel guitar
- Barry Bales – background vocals, upright bass

== Charts ==
=== Weekly charts ===
Chart (2004)	Peak position
US Billboard 200	29
US Top Bluegrass Albums (Billboard)	1
US Top Country Albums (Billboard)	6

=== Year-end charts ===
Chart (2005)	Position
US Billboard 200	106
US Top Country Albums (Billboard)	14

== Certifications ==
Region	Certification	Certified units/sales
United States (RIAA)	Gold	500,000^{^}
^{^} Shipments figures based on certification alone.
