= Alison Krauss =

American musician (born 1971)

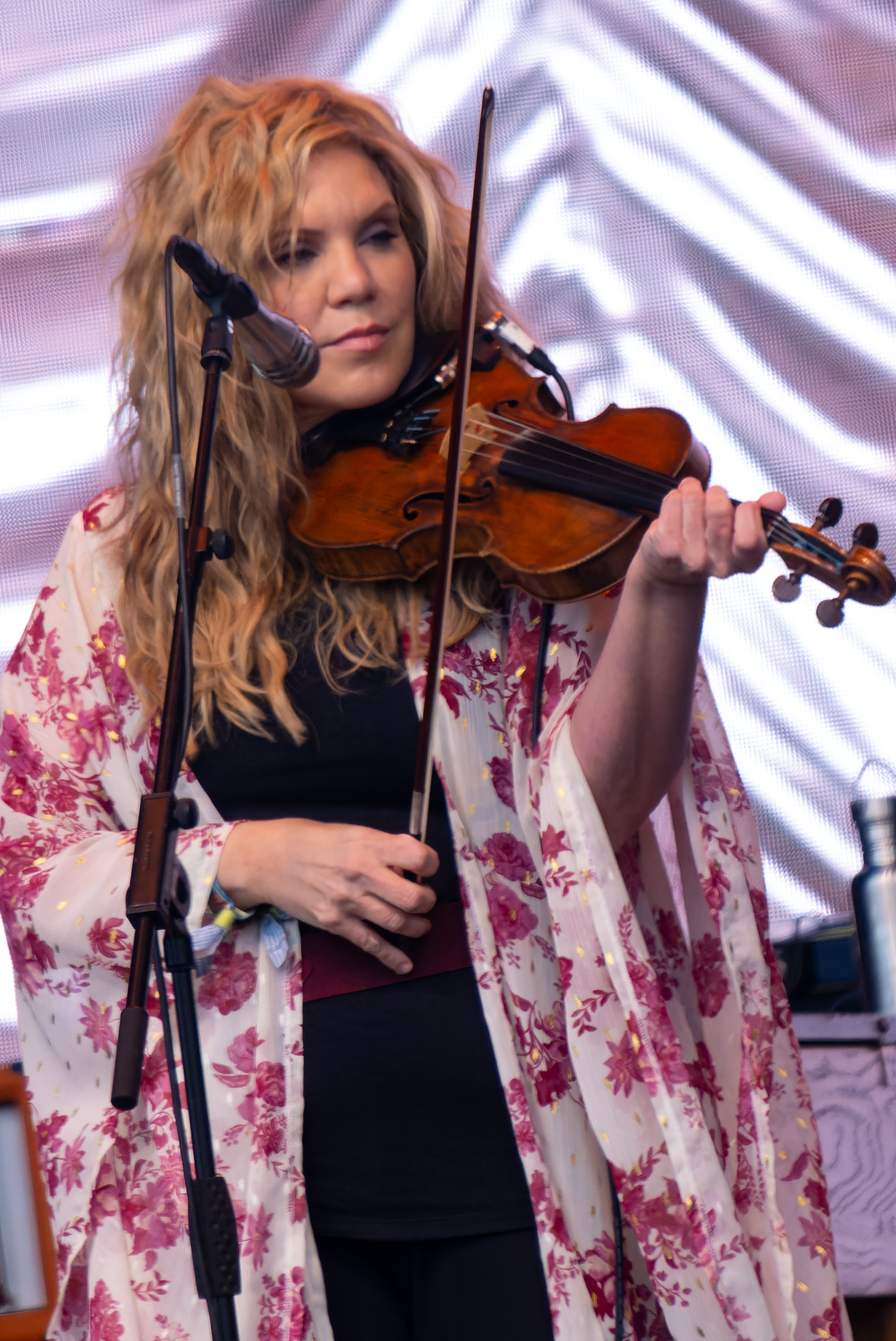
- Krauss at the 2022 Glastonbury Festival

Background information
- Born: Alison Maria Krauss; July 23, 1971 (age 55); Decatur, Illinois, U.S.
- Origin: Champaign, Illinois, U.S.
- Genres: Bluegrass; country; pop
- Occupation: Musician
- Instruments: Vocals; fiddle; piano; mandolin
- Years active: 1984–present
- Labels: Rounder; Capitol
- Member of: Alison Krauss & Union Station; Robert Plant and Alison Krauss
- Spouse: Pat Bergeson (m. 1997; div. 2001)
- Website: alisonkrauss.com

Alison Maria Krauss (born July 23, 1971) is an American bluegrass singer and musician. She entered the American music industry at an early age, competing in local contests by the age of eight and recording for the first time at 14. She signed with Rounder Records in 1985 and released her first solo album in 1987. She was invited to join Union Station, releasing her first album with them as a group in 1989 and performing with them ever since.

Krauss has released 14 albums, appeared on numerous soundtracks, and helped to spark a renewed interest in bluegrass music in the United States. Her soundtrack performances have led to further popularity, including the O Brother, Where Art Thou? soundtrack and the Cold Mountain soundtrack, which led to her performance at the 2004 Academy Awards. Platinum-selling Raising Sand (2007) was the first of her two collaborations with English rock singer Robert Plant.

As of 2025, she has won 27 Grammy Awards from 46 nominations, ranking her fourth behind Beyoncé, Quincy Jones, and classical conductor Georg Solti for most Grammy Award wins overall. Krauss was the singer and female artist with the most awards in Grammy history until Beyoncé won her 28th Grammy in 2021. When Krauss won her first Grammy in the 33rd Annual Grammy Awards in 1991, she was the second-youngest winner at that time.

On November 21, 2019, she was awarded the National Medal of Arts. She was inducted into the International Bluegrass Music Hall of Fame in September 2021.

== Early life ==
Alison Maria Krauss was born in Decatur, Illinois,^{[a]} to Fred and Louise Krauss.

Krauss is of mostly German descent and has some Italian ancestry as well. Fred Krauss is a German immigrant who came to the United States in 1952 at age 12 and taught his native language while he earned a doctorate in psychology. He later went into the business of real estate; among the properties he owned was the so-called American Football House, located at 704 W. High St. in Urbana, which was featured on the cover of the first album by emo band American Football. Louise Krauss, an American of German and Italian descent, is the daughter of artists and works as an illustrator of magazines and textbooks. Fred and Louise met while they were studying at the University of Illinois at Urbana–Champaign.

After a brief residence in nearby Decatur where Alison was born, the family settled in Champaign, where she was raised with her older brother, Viktor.

Krauss's mother played banjo and acoustic guitar, so Krauss was exposed to folk music at home, and she heard rock and pop music on the radio: She liked Gary Numan's synth-pop song "Cars" and rock bands such as Foreigner, Bad Company, and Electric Light Orchestra. Her brother, Viktor, played piano and double bass in high school, launching a career as a jazz and rock multi-instrumentalist. At her mother's insistence, Krauss began studying classical violin at age five. Krauss was reluctant to spend time practicing, but she continued with classical lessons until she was eleven. Krauss said her mother "tried to find interesting things for me to do" and "wanted to get me involved in music, in addition to art and sports". Krauss was also very active in roller skating, and in her teens she finally decided on a career in music rather than roller derby.

In mid-1979, Krauss's mother saw a notice for an upcoming fiddle competition at the Champaign County Fair, so she bought a bluegrass fiddle instruction book and the 1977 bluegrass album Duets by violinist Richard Greene. Krauss learned by ear to play several songs from the album, including "Tennessee Waltz", which she practiced on violin with her mother accompanying on guitar. Krauss entered the talent contest in the novice category at the age of eight, placing fourth. (This is where she first met fiddler Andrea Zonn, who won the junior division at age 10.) Krauss investigated the bluegrass genre more thoroughly after this, and she developed a knack for learning complex riffs by ear, quickly turning them into her own version. In 1981–82, Krauss performed with Marvin Lee Flessner's country dance band, in which she fiddled and sang. In September 1983, her parents bought her a custom violin made by hand in Missouri – her first adult-sized instrument. At 13, she won the Walnut Valley Festival Fiddle Championship, and the Society for the Preservation of Bluegrass in America named her the "Most Promising Fiddler in the Midwest". She was also called "virtuoso" by Vanity Fair magazine.

Krauss first met Dan Tyminski around 1984 at a festival held by the Society. Every current member of her band, Union Station, first met her at these festivals.

== Career ==
=== 1985–1991: Early career ===
Krauss made her recording debut in 1986 on the independent album, Different Strokes, in collaboration with Swamp Weiss and Jim Hoiles, and featuring her brother, Viktor Krauss. From the age of 12 she performed with bassist and songwriter John Pennell in a band called "Silver Rail", replacing Andrea Zonn. Pennell later changed the band's name to Union Station after another band was discovered with the name Silver Rail.

Later that year, she signed to Rounder Records, and in 1987, at 16, she released her debut album Too Late to Cry with Union Station as her backup band.

Krauss' debut solo album was quickly followed by her first group album with Union Station in 1989, Two Highways. The album includes the traditional tunes "Wild Bill Jones" and "Beaumont Rag", along with a bluegrass interpretation of the Allman Brothers' "Midnight Rider".

Krauss' contract with Rounder required her to alternate between releasing a solo album and an album with Union Station, and she released the solo album I've Got That Old Feeling in 1990. It was her first album to rise onto the Billboard charts, peaking in the top seventy-five on the country chart. The album also was a notable point in her career as she earned her first Grammy Award, the single "Steel Rails" was her first single tracked by Billboard, and the title single "I've Got That Old Feeling" was the first song for which she recorded a music video.

=== 1992–1999: Rising success ===
Alison Krauss & Union Station
Name	Role
Alison Krauss	Lead vocals, piano, fiddle
Larry Atamanuik	Drums, percussion
Barry Bales	Bass
Ron Block	Guitar, banjo
Jerry Douglas	Dobro
Russell Moore	Guitar, mandolin

Krauss' second Union Station album Every Time You Say Goodbye was released in 1992, and she went on to win her second Grammy Award for Best Bluegrass Album of the year. She then joined the Grand Ole Opry in 1993 at the age of 21. She was the youngest cast member at the time, and the first bluegrass artist to join the Opry in 29 years. She also collaborated on a project with the Cox Family in 1994, a bluegrass album called I Know Who Holds Tomorrow. Mandolin and guitar player Dan Tyminski replaced Tim Stafford in Union Station in 1994. Late in the year, Krauss recorded with the band Shenandoah on its single "Somewhere in the Vicinity of the Heart", which brought her to the country music Top Ten for the first time and it won the Grammy Award for Best Country Collaboration with Vocals. Also in 1994, Krauss collaborated with Suzy Bogguss, Kathy Mattea, and Crosby, Stills, and Nash to contribute "Teach Your Children" to the AIDS benefit album Red Hot + Country produced by the Red Hot Organization. She contributed vocals on Phish's (2025 Rock & Roll Hall of Fame nominee) "If I Could," from their 1994 studio album Hoist. In 1997, she recorded vocals and violin for "Half a Mind", on Tommy Shaw's 7 Deadly Zens album.

Now That I've Found You: A Collection, a compilation of older releases and some covers of her favorite works by other artists, was released in 1995. Some of these covers include Bad Company's "Oh Atlanta", the Foundations' & Dan Schafer's "Baby, Now That I've Found You", which was used in the Australian hit comedy movie The Castle, and the Beatles' "I Will" with Tony Furtado. A cover of Keith Whitley's "When You Say Nothing at All" reached number three on the Billboard country chart; the album peaked in the top fifteen on the all-genre Billboard 200 chart, and sold two million copies to become Krauss' first double-platinum album. Krauss also was nominated for four Country Music Association Awards and won all of them.

So Long So Wrong, another Union Station album, was released in 1997 and won the Grammy Award for Best Bluegrass Album. One critic said its sound was "rather untraditional" and "likely [to] change quite a few ... minds about bluegrass". Included on the album is the track "It Doesn't Matter", which was featured in the second-season premiere episode of Buffy the Vampire Slayer and was included on the Buffy soundtrack in 1999.

Her next solo release in 1999, Forget About It, included one of her two tracks to appear on the Billboard adult contemporary chart, "Stay". The album was certified gold and charted within the top seventy-five of the Billboard 200 and in the top five of the country chart. In addition, the track "That Kind of Love" was included in another episode of Buffy the Vampire Slayer.

=== 2000–present: Current career ===
Adam Steffey left Union Station in 1998 and was replaced by renowned dobro player Jerry Douglas. Douglas had provided studio back-up to Krauss' records since 1987's Too Late to Cry. Their next album, New Favorite, was released on August 14, 2001. The album went on to win the Grammy for Best Bluegrass Album, with the single "The Lucky One" winning a Grammy as well. New Favorite was followed up by the double platinum double album Live in 2002 and a release of a DVD of the same live performance in 2003. Both the album and the DVD were recorded during a performance at The Louisville Palace and both the album and DVD have been certified double Platinum. Also in 2002 she played a singing voice for one of the characters in the animated comedy film Eight Crazy Nights.

Lonely Runs Both Ways was released in 2004, and eventually became another Alison Krauss & Union Station gold certified album. Ron Block described Lonely Runs Both Ways as "pretty much... what we've always done" in terms of song selection and the style, in which those songs were recorded. Krauss believes the group "was probably the most unprepared we've ever been" for the album and that songs were chosen as needed rather than planned. She also performed a duet with Brad Paisley on his album Mud on the Tires in the single "Whiskey Lullaby". The single was quickly ranked in the top fifty of the Billboard Hot 100 and the top five of the Hot Country Songs, and won the Country Music Association Awards for "Best Musical Event" and "Best Music Video" of the year.

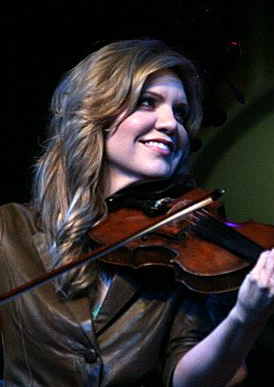
Krauss in 2007

In 2007, Krauss and Robert Plant released the collaborative album titled Raising Sand. RIAA-certified platinum, the album was nominated for and won five Grammy Awards at the 51st Annual Grammy Awards, including Album of the Year, Best Contemporary Folk/Americana Album, and Record of the Year ("Please Read the Letter"). Krauss and Plant recorded a Crossroads special in October 2007 for the Country Music Television network, which first aired on February 12, 2008.

Returning with Union Station, Krauss released an album called Paper Airplane on April 12, 2011, the follow-up album to Lonely Runs Both Ways (2004). Mike Shipley, the recording and mixing engineer for the album, said that the album had a lengthy production time because of Krauss' non-stop migraines. Nevertheless, Paper Airplane became Krauss's highest-charting album in the U.S., reaching number three on the Billboard 200 on topping both the country and bluegrass album charts.

In 2014, Krauss and her band Union Station toured with Willie Nelson and Family, with special guests Kacey Musgraves, and the Devil Makes Three.

Capitol Records released Windy City, an album of country and bluegrass classics, produced by Buddy Cannon and her first solo release in 17 years, on February 17, 2017. Krauss received two nominations at the 60th Annual Grammy Awards for Best Country Solo Performance and Best American Roots Performance.

In August 2021, Krauss announced she was releasing a sequel album to Raising Sand with Robert Plant called Raise the Roof. The album was released in November that year, and Krauss and Plant went on tour as a duo.

In January 2025, it was announced that Union Station would be releasing their first album since 2011. Arcadia was released on March 28, 2025, followed by an extensive tour.

=== Other work ===
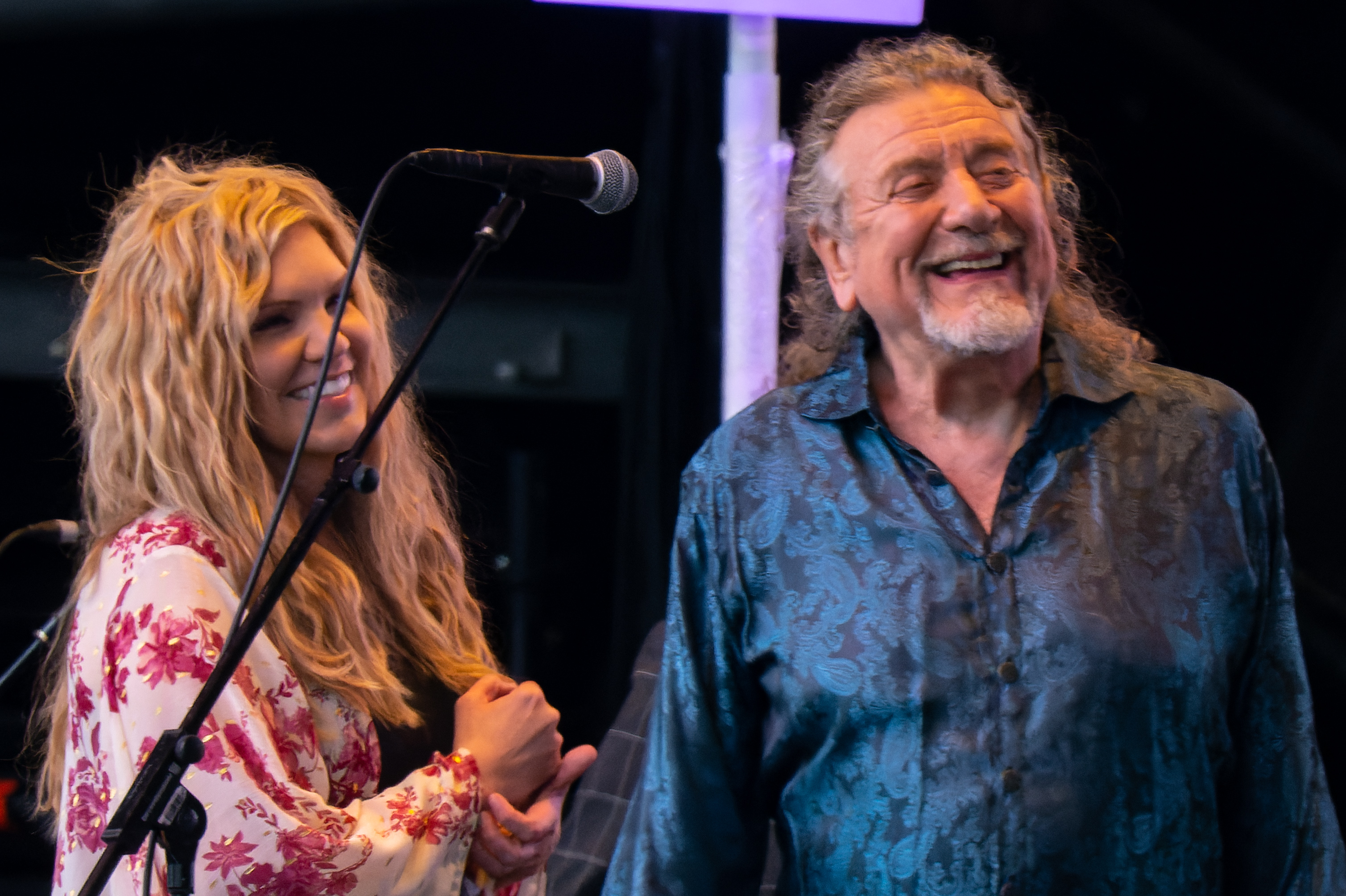
Krauss on stage with Robert Plant at Birmingham at the Glastonbury Festival in 2022

Krauss has made guest appearances on other records on lead vocals, harmony vocals, and fiddle. In 1987, at the age of 15, she played fiddle on the album The Western Illinois Rag by Americana musician Chris Vallillo. In 1993 she recorded vocals for the Phish song "If I Could" in Los Angeles. In 1997 she sang harmony vocals in both English and Irish on the album Runaway Sunday by Irish traditional band Altan. In 1998 she played and sang on the title track of Hawaiian slack-key artist Ledward Kaapana's album, Waltz of the Wind.

Krauss had her only number one hit in 2000, receiving vocal credit for "Buy Me a Rose". She has contributed to numerous motion picture soundtracks, most notably O Brother, Where Art Thou? (2000). She and Dan Tyminski contributed multiple tracks, including "I'll Fly Away" (with Gillian Welch), "Down to the River to Pray", and "I Am a Man of Constant Sorrow". In the film, Tyminski's vocals on "I Am a Man of Constant Sorrow" were used for George Clooney's character. The soundtrack sold over seven million copies and won the Grammy for Album of the Year in 2002. Both Krauss and the surprisingly popular album were credited with reviving interest in bluegrass. She has said, however, that she believes Americans already liked bluegrass and other less-heard musical genres, and that the film merely provided easy exposure to the music. She did not appear in the movie, at her own request, because she was pregnant during its filming.

In 2007, Krauss released A Hundred Miles or More: A Collection, an album of new songs, soundtrack tunes, and duets with artists such as John Waite, James Taylor, Brad Paisley, and Natalie MacMaster. The album was successful commercially but given a lukewarm reception by critics. One of the tracks, "Missing You", a duet with Waite (and a cover of his hit single from 1984), was similarly received as a single. On August 11, television network Great American Country aired a one-hour special, Alison Krauss: A Hundred Miles or More, based on the album.

Krauss appeared on Heart's March 2010 concert DVD Night at Sky Church, providing the lead vocals for the song "These Dreams".

Other soundtracks for which Krauss has performed include Twister, The Prince of Egypt, Eight Crazy Nights, Mona Lisa Smile, Divine Secrets of the Ya-Ya Sisterhood, Alias, Bambi II and Cold Mountain. She contributed "Jubilee" to the 2004 documentary Paper Clips. The Cold Mountain songs she sang, "The Scarlet Tide" with T Bone Burnett and Elvis Costello, and "You Will Be My Ain True Love" with Sting, were each nominated for an Academy Award. She performed both songs at the 76th Academy Awards, the first with Costello and Burnett, and the other with Sting. She produced Nickel Creek's debut album (2000) and the follow-up This Side (2002), which won Krauss her first Grammy award as a producer.

Krauss performed on Moody Bluegrass: A Nashville Tribute to the Moody Blues.

She participated in Billy Childs' 2014 tribute album to Laura Nyro, Map to the Treasure: Reimagining Laura Nyro, performing on the track "And When I Die".

Krauss also appears on Def Leppard's twelfth studio album, Diamond Star Halos, released March 2022, as a featured vocalist on the songs "This Guitar" and "Lifeless". Krauss duetted with High Valley on the group's 2023 single "Do This Life". Krauss is featured on the song "Thankful" on Ringo Starr's 2025 album Look Up.

== Reception and influences ==
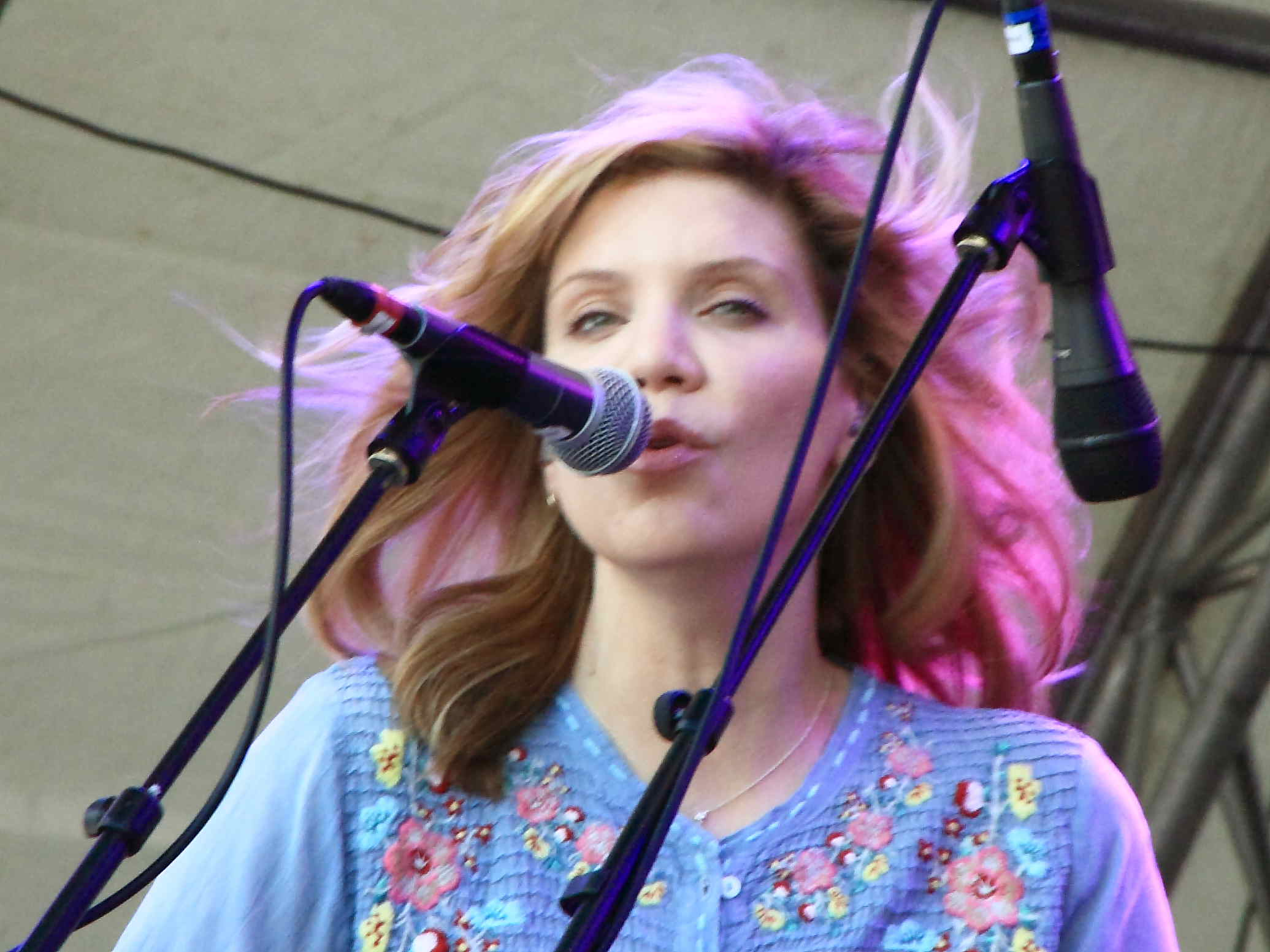
Krauss performing live in 2012

Krauss' earliest musical experience was as an instrumentalist, though her style has grown to focus more on her vocals with a band providing most of the instrumentation. Musicians she enjoys include vocalists Lou Gramm of Foreigner and Paul Rodgers of Bad Company. Krauss' family listened to "folk records" while she was growing up, but she had friends who exposed her to such acts as AC/DC, Carly Simon, the Rolling Stones, Lynyrd Skynyrd, and ELO. She cites Dolly Parton, with whom she has since collaborated a number of times, as a major influence. Some credit Krauss and Union Station, at least partially, with a recent revival of interest in bluegrass music in the United States. Despite being together for nearly two decades and winning numerous awards, she said the group was "just beginning right now" (in 2002) because "in spite of all the great things that have happened for the band, [she] feel[s] musically it's just really beginning". Although she alternates between solo releases and works with the band, she has said there is no difference in her involvement between the two.

As a group, AKUS have been called "American favourites", "world-beaters", and "the tightest band around". While they have been successful as a group, many reviews note Krauss still "remains the undisputed star and rock-solid foundation" and have described her as the "band's focus" with an "angelic" voice that "flows like honey". Her work has been compared to that of the Cox Family, Bill Monroe, and Del McCoury, and has in turn been credited with influencing various "Newgrass" artists including Nickel Creek, for which she acted as record producer on two of their albums. In addition to her work with Nickel Creek, she has acted as producer to the Cox Family, Reba McEntire and Alan Jackson. Adam Sweeting of The Guardian has said Krauss and Union Station are "superb, when they stick to hoedowns and hillbilly music, but much less convincing, when they lurch towards the middle of the road". Blender magazine has said the "flavorless repertoire [Krauss] sings... steers her toward Lite FM". In addition, Q magazine and The Onion AV Club have said their newer releases are "pretty much the usual", and that although Krauss is generally "adventurous", these recent releases contain nothing to "alienate the masses".

=== Voice, themes, and musical style ===
Krauss possesses a soprano voice, which has been described as "angelic".

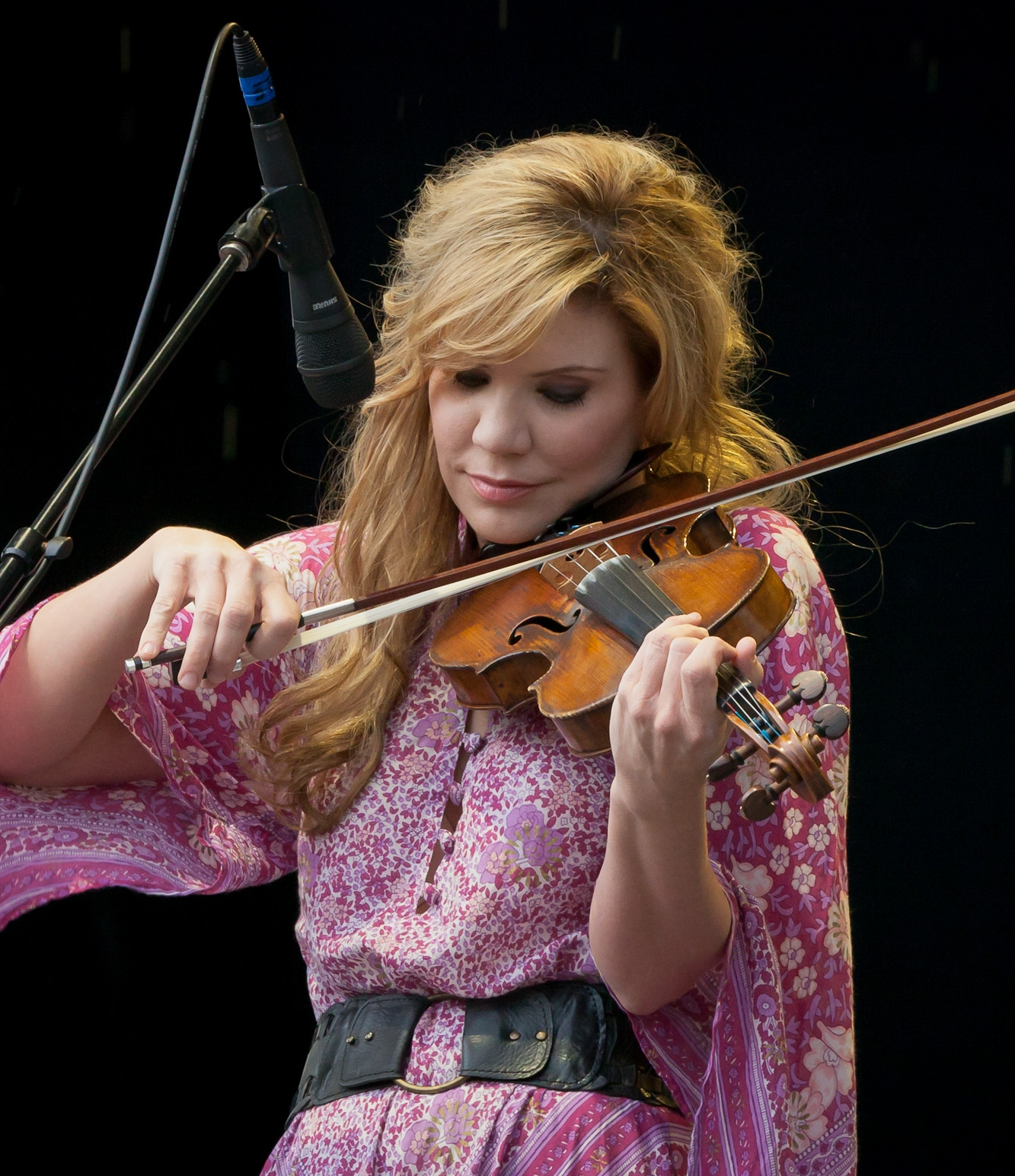
Krauss at the 2011 IBMAs

She has said her musical influences include J. D. Crowe, Ricky Skaggs, and Tony Rice. Many of her songs are described as sad, and are often about love, especially lost love. Though Krauss has a close involvement with her group and a long career in music, she rarely performs music she has written herself. She has also described her general approach to constructing an album as starting with a single song and selecting other tracks based on the first, to give the final album a somewhat consistent theme and mood. She most commonly performs in the bluegrass and country genres, though she has had two songs on the adult contemporary charts, has worked with rock artists such as Phish and Sting, and is sometimes said to stray into pop music.

=== Music videos ===
Krauss did not think she would make music videos at the beginning of her career. After recording her first she was convinced it was so bad that she would never do another. Nonetheless, she has continued to make further videos. Many of the first videos she saw were by bluegrass artists. Dan Tyminski has noted that the video for Thriller was very popular at the time she was first exposed to music videos. She has made suggestions on the style or theme to some videos, though she tends to leave such decisions to the director of the particular video. The group chooses directors by seeking out people who have previously directed videos that band members have enjoyed. The director for a video to "If I Didn't Know Any Better" from Lonely Runs Both Ways, for example, was selected because Krauss enjoyed work he had done with Def Leppard and, she wondered, what he could do with their music. While style decisions are generally left to the various directors of the videos, many – including for "The Lucky One", "Restless", "Goodbye is All We Have", "New Favorite", and "If I Didn't Know Any Better" – follow a pattern. In all of these videos Krauss walks, sometimes interacting with other people, while the rest of the band follows her.

=== Performances ===
Krauss has said she used to dislike working in the studio, where she had to perform the same song repeatedly, but has come to like studio work roughly the same as live stage performances. Her own favorite concert experiences include watching three Foreigner concerts during a single tour, a Dolly Parton concert, and a Larry Sparks concert.

She appeared on Austin City Limits in 1992 and opened the show in 1995 with Union Station. The New Favorite tour, after AKUS' album of the same name, was planned to start September 12, 2001 in Cincinnati, Ohio, but was delayed until September 28 in Savannah, Georgia following the September 11 terrorist attacks. Krauss took part in the Down from the Mountain tour in 2002, which featured many artists from the O Brother, Where Art Thou soundtrack. Down from the Mountain was followed by the Great High Mountain Tour, which was composed of musicians from both O Brother and Cold Mountain, including Krauss. She has also given several notable smaller performances including at Carnegie Hall (with the Grand Ole Opry), on Lifetime Television in a concert of female performers, on the radio show A Prairie Home Companion, where she sang two songs not previously recorded on any of her albums, and a performance at the White House attended by then-President Bill Clinton and then-Vice President Al Gore. She has also been in the White House again, performing the song "When You Say Nothing at All" at country music performances. She also performed a tribute to the Everly Brothers at which she sang "All I Have to Do is Dream" with Emmylou Harris and "When Will I Be Loved" with Vince Gill. She was also invited by Taylor Swift to perform with her at the 2013 CMA's and by Joshua Bell to perform with him on a Christmas album; Bell said that "she (Krauss) is someone I've adored for so many years now". She performed at DAR Constitution Hall in Washington, D.C., on January 10, 2015, as a part of "The Life and Songs of Emmylou Harris: An All Star Concert Celebration" which is a tribute to Emmylou Harris.

== Awards and honors ==
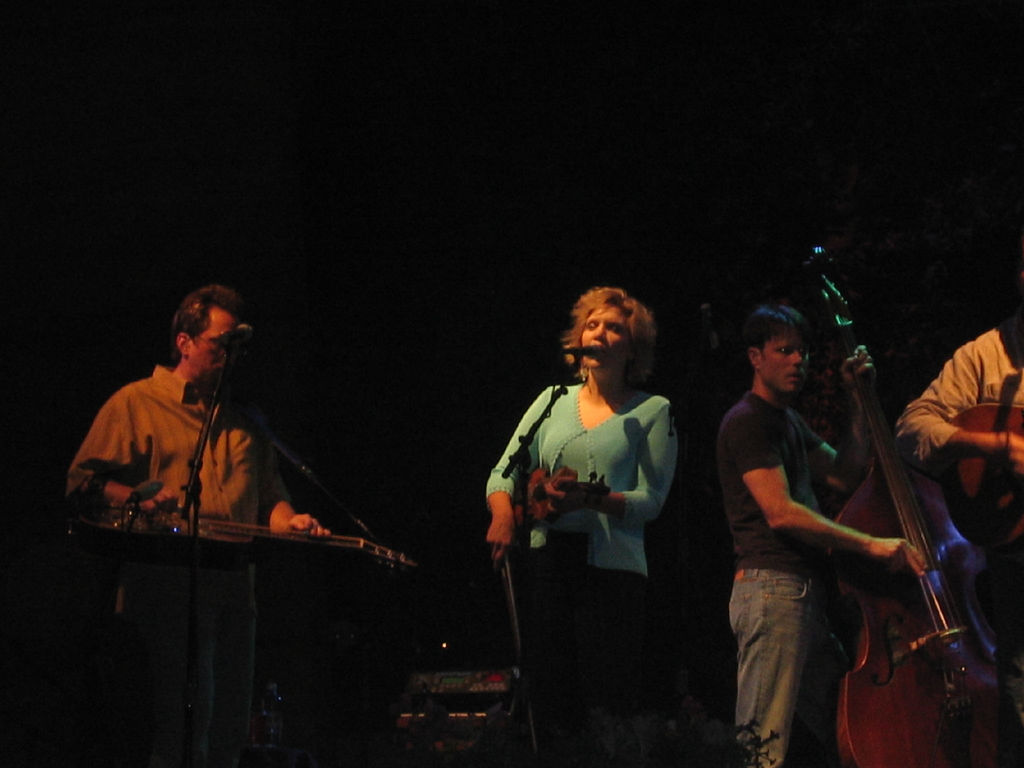
Krauss with her band Union Station

Krauss has won twenty-seven Grammy Awards over the course of her career as a solo artist, as a group with Union Station, as a duet with Robert Plant, and as a record producer. As of 2025, she ranks fifth on the list of winners of the most Grammy Awards. She overtook Aretha Franklin for the most female wins at the 46th Grammy Awards, where Krauss won three, bringing her total at the time to seventeen (Franklin won her sixteenth that night). The Recording Academy (which presents the Grammy Awards) presented her with a special musical achievement honor in 2005. She has also won 15 International Bluegrass Music Association Awards, 9 Country Music Association Awards, 2 Gospel Music Association Awards, 2 CMT Music Awards, 2 Academy of Country Music Awards, and 2 Canadian Country Music Awards. Country Music Television ranked Krauss 12th on their "40 Greatest Women of Country Music" list in 2002.

At the 76th Academy Awards in February 2004, where she performed two nominated songs from the Cold Mountain soundtrack, Krauss was chosen by Hollywood shoe designer Stuart Weitzman to wear a pair of $2 million 'Cinderella' sandals with 4½ inch clear glass stiletto heels and two straps adorned with 565 Kwiat diamonds set in platinum. Feeling like a rather unglamorous choice, Krauss said, "When I first heard, I was like, 'What were they thinking?' I have the worst feet of anybody who will be there that night!" In addition to the fairy-tale-inspired shoes, Weitzman outfitted Krauss with a Palm Trēo 600 smartphone, bejeweled with 3,000 clear-and-topaz-colored Swarovski crystals. The shoes were returned, but Krauss kept the crystal-covered phone. Weitzman chose Krauss to show off his fashions at the urging of his daughters, who are fans of Krauss' music.

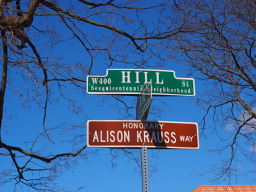
Honorary Alison Krauss Way in Champaign, Illinois

In May 2012, Alison Krauss was awarded an Honorary Doctorate of Music from Berklee College of Music.

In March 2015, her hometown of Champaign, Illinois, designated the 400 block of West Hill Street as "Honorary Alison Krauss Way".

On April 13, 2024, Krauss became a recipient of the Order of Lincoln, which is Illinois' highest civilian honor.

== Personal life ==
Krauss was married to musician Pat Bergeson from 1997 to 2001. They have one child, born in 1999.

== Discography ==
Studio albums

- 1986: Different Strokes (with Jim Hoiles and Swamp Weiss)
- 1987: Too Late to Cry
- 1989: Two Highways (with Union Station)
- 1990: I've Got That Old Feeling
- 1992: Every Time You Say Goodbye (with Union Station)
- 1994: I Know Who Holds Tomorrow (with the Cox Family)
- 1995: Now That I've Found You: A Collection
- 1997: So Long So Wrong (with Union Station)
- 1999: Forget About It
- 2001: New Favorite (with Union Station)
- 2004: Lonely Runs Both Ways (with Union Station)
- 2007: Raising Sand (with Robert Plant)
- 2011: Paper Airplane (with Union Station)
- 2017: Windy City
- 2021: Raise the Roof (with Robert Plant)
- 2025: Arcadia (with Union Station)

== Filmography ==
List of film credits
Year	Title	Role	Notes
1992	High Lonesome: The Story of Bluegrass Music	Herself	Documentary and concert film
1997	Annabelle's Wish	Additional Voices	Uncredited; Voice only
2000	Down from the Mountain	Herself	Documentary and concert film
2002	Eight Crazy Nights	Jennifer	Singing voice only
2004	Paper Clips	Herself	Singing Voice Only

List of television credits
Year	Title	Role	Notes
1991	Hee Haw	Herself	Episode: "No. 22.21"
1992	Austin City Limits	Herself	6 episodes; 1992–2005
1997	Miracle on Highway 31	Herself	Television film
2005	Sesame Street	Herself	Episode: "American Fruit Stand"
2006	CMT Cross Country	Performer	with Vince Gill
2008	CMT Crossroads	Performer	with Robert Plant
2022	CMT Crossroads	Performer	with Robert Plant

== Notes ==
a. Sources vary on birthplace; see talk page discussion

Awards
Preceded by Patty Griffin	AMA Album of the Year (artist); 2008 with Robert Plant	Succeeded by Buddy & Julie Miller
Preceded by The Avett Brothers	AMA Duo/Group of the Year; 2008 with Robert Plant	Succeeded by Buddy & Julie Miller
