= Different Strokes (album) =

Studio album by Jim Hoiles & Friends, Alison Krauss and Swamp Weiss
- Released: 1986
- Studios: Crusade, Flora, Illinois
- Genre: Bluegrass
- Label: Fiddle Tunes
- Producers: Jim Hoiles, Bruce "Swamp" Weiss

Jim Hoiles & Friends, Alison Krauss and Swamp Weiss chronology
Different Strokes (1986)	Too Late to Cry (1987)

Professional ratings
Review scores
Source	Rating
AllMusic	2.5/5 stars

Different Strokes is an album by Jim Hoiles & Friends, Alison Krauss and Swamp Weiss. It also features bassist Viktor Krauss, brother of bluegrass singer and violinist Alison Krauss. Released in 1986, the album is a collection of traditional bluegrass fiddle tunes.

== Track listing ==
All tracks are traditional.

1. "Sally Goodin'"
2. "One Hundred Pipers"
3. "Swamp's Reel"
4. "Dusty Miller"
5. "Nate's Waltz"
6. "Go Hither to Go Yonder"
7. "Grey Eagle"
8. "Morrison's Reel"
9. "Song for Norman"
10. "Nick's Noodle"
11. "Stack of Barley"
12. "Daybreak in Dixie"

== Personnel ==
- Viktor Krauss – bass
- Alison Krauss – fiddle, vocals
- Bruce Weiss – guitar
- Jim Hoiles – fiddle
