= Every Time You Say Goodbye =

Studio album by Alison Krauss & Union Station
- Released: February 14, 1992
- Studio: Homeplace Studios Suite 2000, Nashville, Tennessee
- Genre: Bluegrass, Americana, folk, country
- Length: 42:08
- Label: Rounder
- Producer: Alison Krauss

Alison Krauss chronology
I've Got That Old Feeling (1990)	Every Time You Say Goodbye (1992)	I Know Who Holds Tomorrow (1994)

Professional ratings
Review scores
Source	Rating
AllMusic	3/5 stars

Every Time You Say Goodbye is the second album by the American bluegrass band Alison Krauss & Union Station, released in 1992. It reached number 75 on the Billboard Country Albums chart.

At the 35th Grammy Awards ceremony held in 1993, Every Time You Say Goodbye won the Grammy Award for Best Bluegrass Album.

== Track listing ==
1. "Every Time You Say Goodbye" (John Pennell) – 3:13
2. "Another Night" (Jack Adkins) – 2:56
3. "Last Love Letter" (Sidney Cox) – 3:04
4. "Cluck Old Hen" (Traditional) – 2:30
5. "Who Can Blame You" (Ron Block) – 3:17
6. "It Won't Work This Time" (Aubrey Holt) – 2:59
7. "Heartstrings" (Marshall Wilborn) – 3:30
8. "I Don't Know Why" (Shawn Colvin) – 2:43
9. "Cloudy Days" (Billy Ray Reynolds) – 3:26
10. "New Fool" (Sidney Cox) – 2:47
11. "Shield of Faith" (Ron Block) – 2:34
12. "Lose Again" (Karla Bonoff) – 2:50
13. "Another Day, Another Dollar" (Dan Tyminski) – 2:29
14. "Jesus Help Me to Stand" (Ron Block) – 3:50

== Personnel ==
- Alison Krauss – fiddle, vocals
- Ron Block – banjo, vocals
- Barry Bales – bass, vocals
- Tim Stafford – guitar, vocals
- Adam Steffey – mandolin, vocals

== Chart performance ==
Chart (1992)	Peak position
U.S. Billboard Top Country Albums	75
U.S. Billboard Top Heatseekers	34
