= Two Highways =

Studio album by Alison Krauss & Union Station
- Released: 1989
- Studios: The Nashville Sound Connection, Nashville, TN
- Genres: Bluegrass, country
- Length: 38:05
- Label: Rounder
- Producer: Bill Vorndick

Alison Krauss chronology
Too Late to Cry (1987)	Two Highways (1989)	I've Got That Old Feeling (1990)

Two Highways is the first album by American band Alison Krauss & Union Station, released in 1989. It was nominated for a Grammy Award, in the "Best Bluegrass Album" category. Krauss and the album also received several International Bluegrass Music Association nominations. "Midnight Rider" is a cover of the Allman Brothers Band song.

== Critical reception ==
Professional ratings
Review scores
Source	Rating
AllMusic	4/5 stars
Chicago Tribune	2/4 stars

The Chicago Tribune noted that "things manage to get cluttered enough that Krauss' voice, which has the charm and power of vintage Dolly Parton, sometimes gets lost." The Gazette wrote that Krauss "has a Brill Building-calibre ear when it comes to finding new songwriters."

== Track listing ==
1. "Two Highways" (Larry Cordle) – 3:31
2. "I'm Alone Again" (Todd Rakestraw) – 2:53
3. "Wild Bill Jones" (Traditional) – 3:20
4. "Beaumont Rag" (Traditional) – 2:27
5. "Heaven's Bright Shore" (A. Kennedy) – 3:01
6. "Love You in Vain" (John Pennell) – 2:18
7. "Here Comes Goodbye" (John Pennell) – 3:47
8. "As Lovely as You" (John Pennell) – 3:56
9. "Windy City Rag" (Kenny Baker) – 2:25
10. "Lord Don't Forsake Me" (Todd Rakestraw) – 4:02
11. "Teardrops Will Kiss the Morning Dew" (Paul Craft) – 3:38
12. "Midnight Rider" (Gregg Allman, Robert Payne) – 2:47

== Personnel ==
- Alison Krauss – fiddle, vocals
- Jeff White – guitar, vocals
- Mike Harman – banjo, vocals
- John Pennell – bass

with

- Jerry Douglas – dobro
- Brent Truitt – mandolin
