= So Long So Wrong =

Studio album by Alison Krauss & Union Station
- Released: March 25, 1997
- Genre: Bluegrass, country
- Length: 47:47
- Label: Rounder
- Producer: Alison Krauss & Union Station

Alison Krauss chronology
Now That I've Found You: A Collection (1995)	So Long So Wrong (1997)	Forget About It (1999)

Professional ratings
Review scores
Source	Rating
AllMusic	4/5 stars

So Long So Wrong is the third album by the bluegrass group Alison Krauss & Union Station, released in 1997, and the first to feature guitar player Dan Tyminski who would replace Tim Stafford. The album reached number 4 on Billboard's Country Albums chart.

In 1998 So Long So Wrong won three Grammys: Best Country Performance by a Duo or Group with Vocal for "Looking in the Eyes of Love", Best Country Instrumental Performance for "Little Liza Jane", and Best Bluegrass Album.

== Critical reception ==
Country Standard Time called the album "a beautiful, delicate recording," writing that "at its best, this CD shows a great band's instrumental luster and virtuosity." Rolling Stone wrote: "Music this subtle and self-effacing is rare in any category; Union Station shun both the hot-licks showboating of conventional bluegrass and the soft-rock suburbanization of contemporary country."

== Track listing ==
1. "So Long So Wrong" (Patrick Brayer, Walden Dahl) – 3:22
2. "No Place to Hide" (Bob Lucas) – 3:28
3. "Deeper Than Crying" (Mark Simos) – 3:07
4. "I Can Let Go Now" (Michael McDonald) – 2:27
5. "The Road Is a Lover" (Lucas) – 3:11
6. "Little Liza Jane" (Public Domain) – 1:43
7. "It Doesn't Matter" (Harley Allen) – 3:52
8. "Find My Way Back to My Heart" (Simos) – 3:33
9. "I'll Remember You Love in My Prayers" (Public Domain) – 3:02
10. "Looking in the Eyes of Love" (Kostas Lazarides, Tricia Walker) – 4:19
11. "Pain of a Troubled Life" (Ron Block) – 2:54
12. "Happiness" (Michael McDonald, Viktor Krauss) – 3:55
13. "Blue Trail of Sorrow" (Jeff White) – 3:39
14. "There Is a Reason" (Block) – 5:35

== Personnel ==
- Alison Krauss – vocal, fiddle
- Dan Tyminski – guitar, bass, vocals
- Ron Block – guitar, banjo, vocals
- Barry Bales – bass, vocals
- Adam Steffey – mandolin, mandola, vocals

== Charts ==
=== Weekly charts ===
Chart (1997)	Peak position
US Billboard 200	45
US Top Country Albums (Billboard)	4

=== Year-end charts ===
Chart (1997)	Position
US Top Country Albums (Billboard)	39

== Certifications ==
Region	Certification	Certified units/sales
United States (RIAA)	Gold	500,000^{^}
^{^} Shipments figures based on certification alone.
