= Too Late to Cry (Alison Krauss album) =

Studio album by Alison Krauss
- Released: 1987
- Studio: Cowboy Arms (Nashville, Tennessee)
- Genre: Bluegrass
- Length: 35:47
- Label: Rounder
- Producer: Ken Irwin

Alison Krauss chronology
Different Strokes (1985)	Too Late to Cry (1987)	Two Highways (1989)

Too Late to Cry is the debut solo album by American violinist/singer Alison Krauss, released in 1987. It was her first album for Rounder Records.

== Critical reception ==
Professional ratings
Review scores
Source	Rating
AllMusic	3/5 stars

The Philadelphia Inquirer wrote: "Unlike most young fiddle players, who tend to be stiff and earnest, Krauss has a loose, jazzy swing to her playing; unlike most young country singers, who tend to be loose in their phrasing, Krauss is rather stiff and earnest." The Washington Post stated that Krauss's "piercing, country-bred soprano occasionally recall Emmylou Harris at her best, and her fiddle breathes gales of life into tunes like 'Dusty Miller'."

== Track listing ==
All songs by John Pennell unless otherwise noted.

1. "Too Late to Cry" – 2:51
2. "Foolish Heart" – 3:27
3. "Song for Life" (Rodney Crowell) – 2:54
4. "Dusty Miller" (Traditional) – 3:40
5. "If I Give My Heart" – 4:05
6. "In Your Eyes" – 3:15
7. "Don't Follow Me" – 2:44
8. "Gentle River" (Todd Rakestraw) – 4:26
9. "On the Borderline" – 3:40
10. "Forgotten Pictures" (Tony Trischka) – 2:22
11. "Sleep On" (Nelson Mandrell) – 2:23

== Personnel ==
- Alison Krauss – fiddle, vocals
- Russ Barenberg – acoustic guitar
- Sam Bush – mandolin
- John Cowan – vocals
- Dave Denman – vocals
- Jerry Douglas – Dobro
- Roy Huskey Jr. – upright bass
- Lonnie Meeker – acoustic guitar, vocals
- John Schmaltz – banjo
- Tony Trischka – banjo
