= I've Got That Old Feeling =

Studio album by Alison Krauss
- Released: June 13, 1990
- Studios: Sound Shop A and Denny's Den, Nashville, Tennessee
- Genres: Bluegrass, country
- Length: 34:34
- Label: Rounder
- Producers: Jerry Douglas, Bil VornDick

Alison Krauss chronology
Two Highways (1989)	I've Got That Old Feeling (1990)	Every Time You Say Goodbye (1992)

Professional ratings
Review scores
Source	Rating
AllMusic	4.5/5 stars

I've Got That Old Feeling is the second solo album by American bluegrass-country singer and musician Alison Krauss, released in 1990. It reached number 61 on the Billboard Country Albums chart.

At the 33rd Grammy Awards, the album's title track, "I've Got That Old Feeling", won Best Bluegrass Recording for 1990. The album was produced by Bil VornDick and Jerry Douglas, who was also featured on dobro.

== Track listing ==
1. "I've Got That Old Feeling" (Sidney Cox) – 2:53
2. "Dark Skies" (John Pennell) – 2:20
3. "Wish I Still Had You" (Sidney Cox) – 3:44
4. "Endless Highway" (Roger Rasnake) – 2:20
5. "Winter of a Broken Heart" (Nelson Mandrell) – 2:56
6. "It's Over" (Nelson Mandrell) – 3:06
7. "Will You Be Leaving" (John Pennell) – 2:22
8. "Steel Rails" (Louisa Branscomb) – 2:17
9. "Tonight I'll Be Lonely Too" (Sidney Cox) – 3:25
10. "One Good Reason" (John Pennell) – 3:06
11. "That Makes One of Us" (Rick Bowles, Barbara Wyrick) – 3:20
12. "Longest Highway" (Cox) – 2:48

== Personnel ==
- Alison Krauss – fiddle, vocals
- Sam Bush – mandolin
- Jeff White – guitar, vocals
- Alison Brown – banjo, vocals
- Stuart Duncan – mandolin
- Edgar Meyer – bass
- Martin Parker – drums
- Dave Pomeroy – bass
- Pete Wasner – piano
- Suzanne Cox – vocals
- Glenn Worf – bass
- Jerry Douglas – dobro

== Chart performance ==
Chart (1991)	Peak position
U.S. Billboard Top Country Albums	61
