= Ron Block =

American singer-songwriter

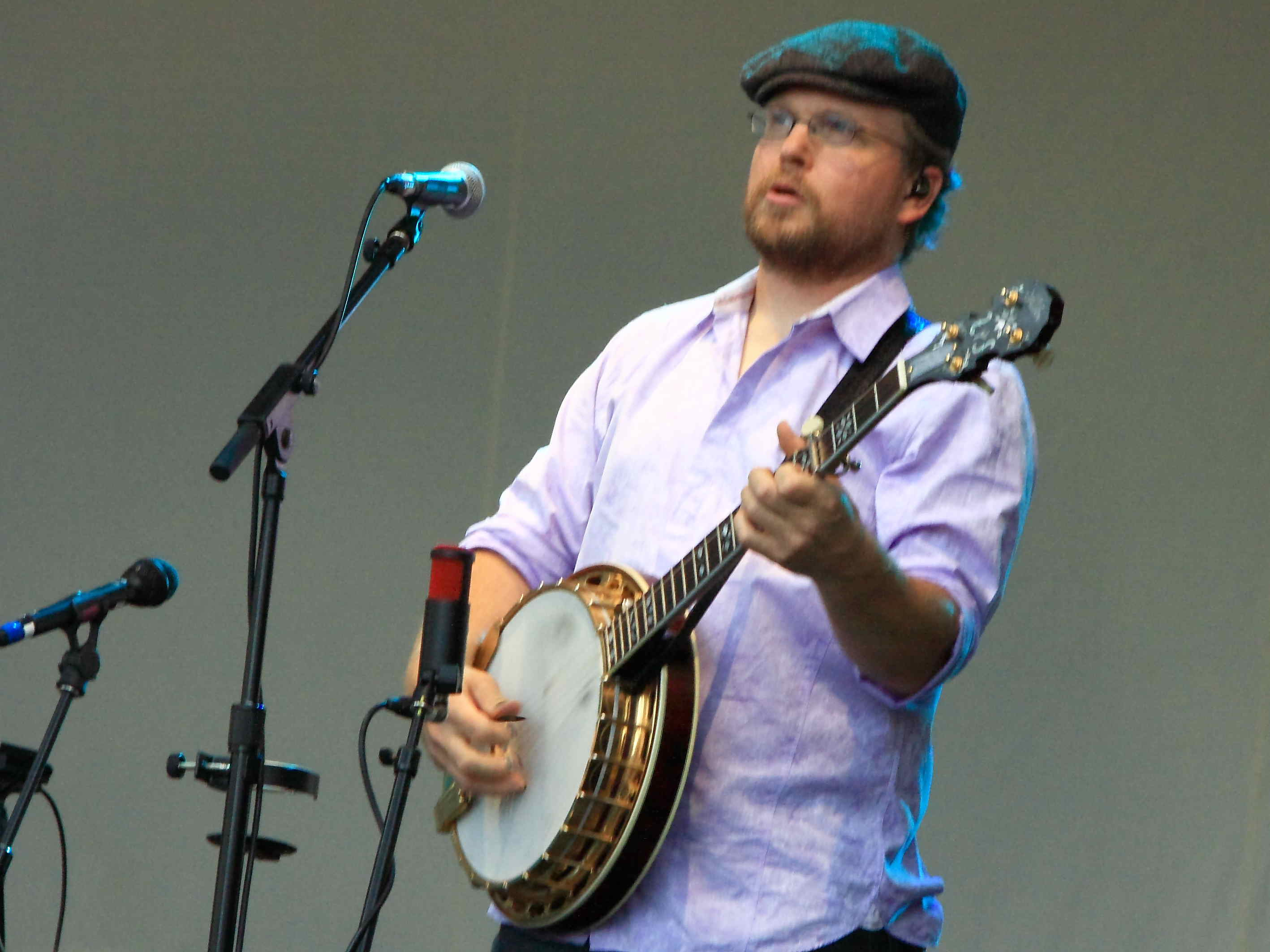
- Block performing in July 2012

Background information
- Born: Ronald Franklin Block; July 30, 1964 (age 61); Gardena, California, U.S.
- Origin: Levelland, Texas, U.S.
- Genres: Bluegrass, country
- Occupations: Singer-songwriter, musician, producer
- Instruments: Banjo, guitar, vocals
- Years active: 1984–present
- Labels: Rounder
- Website: ronblock.com

Ronald Franklin Block (born July 30, 1964) is an American banjo player, guitarist, and singer-songwriter, best known as a member of the bluegrass band Alison Krauss & Union Station. He has won 14 Grammy Awards, 6 International Bluegrass Music Awards, a Country Music Association Award, and a Gospel Music Association Dove Award.

== Biography ==
Ron Block heard a variety of music at an early age because his father owned a music store, Hogan's House of Music, in southern California. At home he was drawn to the bluegrass music of Bill Monroe, J. D. Crowe, and The Stanley Brothers. At the age of 13, after seeing Lester Flatt & Earl Scruggs on TV, he learned to play the banjo. In his teens he also learned acoustic and electric guitar. Later in his career, he recorded a solo album of instrumentals, titled Hogan's House of Music (2015), dedicated to the music store where he spent much of his youth.

In the 1980s, he co-founded the band Weary Hearts, which included Eric Uglum, Butch Baldassari, and Mike Bub, then played with the Lynn Morris Band before joining Union Station in October 1991. During his career, he has also recorded solo albums, produced, and performed on albums by Dolly Parton, Clint Black, Brad Paisley, and Bill Frisell.

Block has written songs for Union Station and for his own solo albums. His songs have been recorded by Randy Travis, Rhonda Vincent, Michael W. Smith, and The Cox Family. Block names as two of his favorites "A Living Prayer" and "There is a Reason," both recorded with Alison Krauss & Union Station, both dealing with his Christian faith.

== Awards ==
=== Grammy ===
- (1992) Best Bluegrass Album: Alison Krauss & Union Station - Every Time You Say Goodbye
- (1996) Best Country Collaboration with Vocals: Vince Gill with Alison Krauss & Union Station - High Lonesome Sound
- (1997) Best Bluegrass Album: Alison Krauss & Union Station - So Long So Wrong
- (1997) Best Country Instrumental Performance: Alison Krauss & Union Station - "Little Liza Jane"
- (1997) Best Country Performance by a Duo or Group with Vocal: Alison Krauss & Union Station - "Looking in the Eyes of Love"
- (2001) Best Bluegrass Album: Alison Krauss & Union Station - New Favorite
- (2001) Best Country Performance by Duo or Group with Vocal: Alison Krauss & Union Station - "The Lucky One"
- (2001) Album of the Year: Various Artists - O Brother, Where Art Thou?
- (2003) Best Bluegrass Album: Alison Krauss & Union Station - Live
- (2003) Best Country Instrumental Performance: Alison Krauss & Union Station - "Cluck Old Hen"
- (2005) Best Country Album: Alison Krauss & Union Station - Lonely Runs Both Ways
- (2005) Best Country Instrumental Performance: Alison Krauss & Union Station - "Unionhouse Branch"
- (2005) Best Country Performance by a Duo or Group with Vocal: Alison Krauss & Union Station - "Restless"
- (2011) Best Bluegrass Album: Alison Krauss & Union Station - Paper Airplane

=== International Bluegrass ===
- (1991) Entertainer of the Year - Alison Krauss & Union Station
- (1993) Album of the Year, Alison Krauss & Union Station - Every Time You Say Goodbye
- (1995) Entertainer of the Year - Alison Krauss & Union Station
- (2001) Album of the Year: Various Artists - O Brother, Where Art Thou?
- (2002) Album of the Year: Various Artists - Down from the Mountain
- (2003) Album of the Year: Alison Krauss & Union Station - Live

=== Country Music Association ===
- (1995) Single of the Year - "When You Say Nothing at All"

=== Gospel Music Association ===
- (1998) Best Bluegrass Song - "A Living Prayer"

== Discography ==
Title	Album details	Peak positions
Title	Album details	US Bluegrass
Faraway Land	Release date: August 7, 2001; Label: Rounder Records	N/A
DoorWay	Release date: June 19, 2007; Label: Rounder Records	7
Walking Song	Release date: July 30, 2013; Label: Rounder Records	7
Hogan's House of Music	Release date: September 25, 2015; Label: Hogan's House of Music	2
Carter's Creek Christmas	Release date: November 27, 2015; Label: Hogan's House of Music	N/A
"—" denotes releases that did not chart

=== Guest appearances ===
- Songs from Twisting River (2014) - West of Eden
