= The Cox Family =

American band

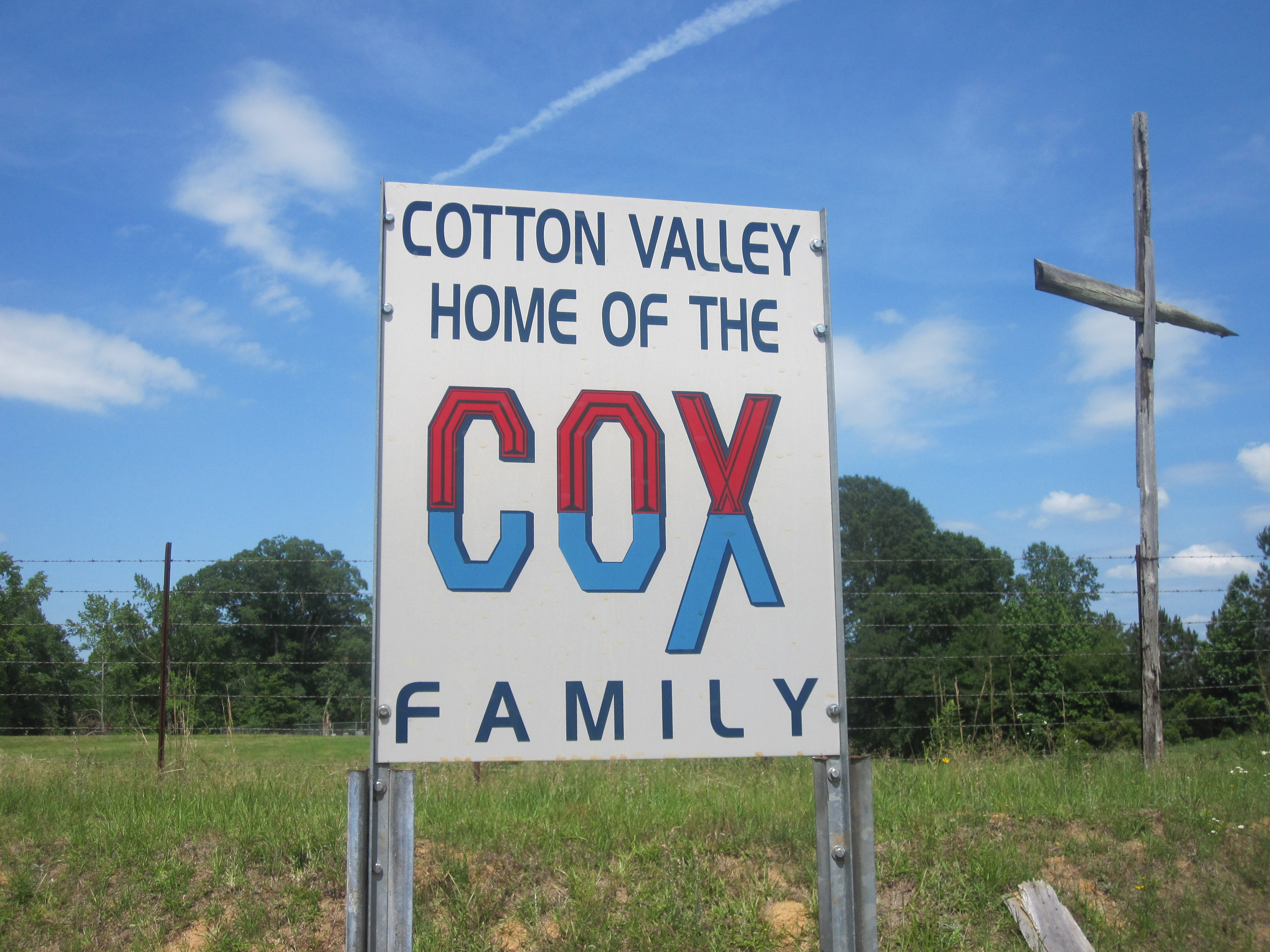
Cotton Valley honors the Cox family with a tourism billboard.

The Cox Family is an American country/bluegrass music group from Cotton Valley in Webster Parish in northwestern Louisiana, United States. The Cox Family can be heard on the O Brother, Where Art Thou? soundtrack. Their 1994 collaboration with Alison Krauss, I Know Who Holds Tomorrow, won the 1995 Grammy Award for Best Southern, Country or Bluegrass Gospel Album. They were nominated for another Grammy for their album Beyond the City. They may also be heard on the Traveller (1997) motion picture soundtrack with their renditions of the Carter Family's "I'm Thinking Tonight of My Blue Eyes" and "Sweeter Than the Flowers". In 2015, they released Gone Like the Cotton, their first album for nearly 20 years.

Evelyn Cox died on May 5, 2026, at the age of 66.

== Members ==
- Evelyn Cox (June 20, 1959 – May 5, 2026) – guitar, vocals
- Lynn Cox (born October 11, 1960) – bass, vocals
- Sidney Cox (born July 21, 1965) – banjo, dobro, guitar, vocals
- Suzanne Cox (born June 5, 1967) – mandolin, vocals
- Willard Cox (June 9, 1937 – November 4, 2019), fiddle, vocals
- Dennis Sunderman – bass

== Discography ==
=== Albums ===
Title	Album details	Peak chart positions	
Title	Album details	US Grass	US Heat
Quiet Storm	Release date: unknown; Label: Wilcox Records	—	—
Heartaches Along the Horizon	Release date: 1987; Label: Wilcox Records	—	—
Everybody's Reaching Out for Someone	Release date: April 1, 1993; Label: Rounder Records	—	—
I Know Who Holds Tomorrow	Release date: January 28, 1994; Label: Rounder Records	—	—
Beyond the City	Release date: April 25, 1995; Label: Rounder Records	—	—
Just When We're Thinking It's Over	Release date: July 30, 1996; Label: Asylum Records	—	—
Gone Like the Cotton	Release date: October 23, 2015; Label: Rounder Records	1	23
"—" denotes releases that did not chart

=== Singles ===
Year	Single	Album
1993	"Cry, Baby, Cry"	Everybody's Reaching Out for Someone
1994	"Walk Over God's Heaven" (with Alison Krauss)	I Know Who Holds Tomorrow
1996	"Runaway"	Just When We're Thinking It's Over
1997	"Cry, Baby, Cry" (re-issue)	Just When We're Thinking It's Over

=== Music videos ===
Year	Video	Director
1994	"Walk Over God's Heaven" (with Alison Krauss)	Joanne Gardner
1996	"Runaway"	John Lloyd Miller
