= Rounder Records =

American record label

- Parent company: Concord (2010-2026); BMG Rights Management (2026-present)
- Founded: 1970; 56 years ago
- Founder: Ken Irwin; Bill Nowlin; Marian Leighton Levy
- Distributor: Universal Music Group
- Genre: Various
- Country of origin: U.S.
- Location: Nashville, Tennessee
- Official website: rounder.com

Rounder Records is an independent record label founded in 1970 in Somerville, Massachusetts, by Marian Leighton Levy, Ken Irwin, and Bill Nowlin. Focused on American roots music, Rounder's catalogue of more than 3000 titles includes records by Alison Krauss and Union Station, George Thorogood, Tony Rice, and Béla Fleck, in addition to re-releases of seminal albums by artists including Carter Family, Jelly Roll Morton, Lead Belly, and Woody Guthrie. "Championing and preserving the music of artists whose music falls outside of the mainstream," Rounder releases have won 54 Grammy Awards representing diverse genres, from bluegrass, folk, reggae, and gospel to pop, rock, Americana, polka, and world music. Acquired by Concord in 2010, Rounder is based in Nashville. In 2016, the founders of Rounder (Levy, Irwin and Nowlin) were inducted into the International Bluegrass Music Hall of Fame.

== History ==
=== Beginnings ===
Rounder was founded by Ken Irwin, Bill Nowlin, and Marian Leighton Levy. Nowlin and Irwin first met in 1962 as incoming freshman at Tufts University in Medford, Massachusetts, a suburb on the north side of Boston. Exposure to the Greenbriar Boys, the Charles River Valley Boys, the Hillbilly at Harvard radio show, and fiddling conventions, as well as the musicians who performed at Club 47, one of the first venues in the Northeast to book African-American blues artists from the American south, fueled their interest in bluegrass, old-time, and other roots music. They were unable to find records by many of the artists they saw live: the records "just didn't exist."

Nowlin and Irwin met Levy, then a student at Clark University in Worcester, Massachusetts in 1967. An "unrepentant folkie," like Nowlin and Irwin, she moved to Boston to attend graduate school at Northeastern University. The three shared an apartment as well as a desire to bring roots music to a wider audience, and began to explore the idea of starting a record company. "We were all involved in radical politics, and the anti-war movement, and a lot of our inspiration for starting Rounder had to do with minority culture and wanting to represent music that we really liked, but that was not in the mainstream," Levy said in a 2015 interview.

=== 1970s: George Pegram, Norman Blake, Rounder 0044, George Thorogood ===
Financed with Irwin's savings of $1500, Rounder was founded in 1970 in the Somerville apartment, a living/working/political collective. The name Rounder was chosen for several reasons: the shape of a vinyl record, the nickname for a hobo, and the name of the folk band The Holy Modal Rounders. Levy, Irwin and Nowlin also self-identified as "Rounders", the name reflecting the "outlaw self-image of three romantics who positioned themselves in opposition to capitalism, the programmatic rigidity of the old Left, and the more doctrinaire cultural rules of the folk revival itself." The lawyer who drew up Rounder's papers of incorporation did so in exchange for two Rounder albums.

Irwin and Nowlin were introduced to fiddle music through a Folkways recording of the 34th Old Time Fiddlers Convention, and in late 1969 (sources differ), for $125 ($1,097 in 2025), they bought the rights to a tape by a 76-year-old banjo player, George Pegram, who had been a star of the Fiddlers Convention. It became Rounder's first release, Rounder 0001. Rounder 0002 was by the Spark Gap Wonder Boys; a local band, the album was recorded at the Harvard and MIT radio stations for "the cost of the tape." 500 copies of each record were pressed. Both were released on October 20, 1970. To boost the label's credibility—and get local record stores to stock their releases—Irwin, Nowlin, and Levy started distributing other small folk labels, and began selling albums at music festivals.

In 1971, the label released its first bluegrass album, One Morning in May, by Joe Val and the New England Bluegrass Boys. Over the next several years, they released bluegrass albums by old-time artists (Snuffy Jenkins and Pappy Sherrill, Highwoods Stringband, and The Blue Sky Boys), traditional bluegrass artists (Don Stover, Ted Lundy, Del McCoury, The Bailey Brothers, Buzz Busby), and progressive bluegrass artists, most notably by Country Cooking and Tony Trischka.

Believing that "music doesn't discriminate," Nowlin, Irwin and Leighton-Levy sought out female artists, then a rarity in the bluegrass world, and in the early 1970s released albums by Hazel Dickens and Alice Gerrard, who recorded as Hazel & Alice, and Ola Belle Reed. By 1974, Rounder had put out 22 records, including the label's breakthrough album, Norman Blake's Home in Sulphur Springs. Realizing that Rounder was no longer a part-time pursuit, Irwin resigned from his job—he was a professor at the University of Lowell—and Nowlin and Levy left graduate school to run Rounder full-time.

In 1975, Rounder released the self-titled debut album by J. D. Crowe and The New South. Called one of the "most pioneering and influential records in the history of bluegrass" by allmusic.com, it was commonly referred to by its stock number, Rounder 0044. The program notes from the 2016 Bluegrass Hall of Fame Induction ceremony stated that the record "did much to chart the course of bluegrass for the balance of the 1970s and beyond."

In addition to new music, Rounder re-released 78 rpm discs from the 1920s and 1930s.

In the mid-1970s, with a catalog of about 200 LPs by acoustic artists, the label expanded its bluegrass focus to include folk, blues and other styles of music, notably signing NRBQ, Arlen Roth and George Thorogood and the Destroyers. In May 1977, Rounder released NRBQ's All Hopped Up. Later that year, George Thorogood and the Destroyers' eponymous debut was released; although it was rooted in blues, it was more of a rock album than any of the label's previous releases. Within a year, the record sold more than 75,000 copies, a substantial achievement at the time for an independently distributed record. Rounder released the Destroyers' second album, Move it on Over, in 1978. The title track, a Hank Williams cover, was released as a single and received heavy FM airplay. The album entered the American Top 40 and went gold, as did the band's debut. Irwin described Thorogood's success as a "watershed" moment for Rounder, stating that while it did not change the founders' interest or mission, it made clear that the label needed to expand both its staff and its distribution. Rounder recorded Thorogood's fourth record, Bad to the Bone, and released it through a joint venture with EMI. At the close of the decade, Rounder moved from their Somerville office to a larger office in Cambridge, Massachusetts.

In 1979, Rounder's employees decided to unionize, and Nowlin, Levy, and Irwin were strongly opposed. The workers voted to join Local 925 of the Service Employees International Union. As a result of their opposition to the union, relations between the employees and the founders were strained for several years.

=== 1980s: Heartbeat, Philo, Alison Krauss ===
Although they were approached by less traditional roots artists following Thorogood's success, the founders signed artists that reflected the label's original mission. Among others, they signed Johnny Copeland and Clarence "Gatemouth" Brown. Scott Billington, a musician and Rounder staff member, was recruited to produce Brown's debut for Rounder with Jim Bateman, and together they pushed Brown to record classic blues songs. The resulting album, Alright Again!, won the 1982 Grammy Award for Best Traditional Blues Album. It was Rounder's first Grammy.

In the early 80s, Rounder once again broadened its focus, establishing a reggae imprint, Heartbeat and adding Klezmer, Cajun, Zydeco and Tex-Mex Conjunto musicians to its roster. Throughout the decade, the label released records by esoteric artists who were unlikely to garner mainstream recognition, including Ted Hawkins, Jonathan Richman, and Sleepy LaBeef.

In 1984, Rounder acquired the traditional and folk music label Philo Records. Among others, the acquisition brought Utah Phillips, Dave Van Ronk, Christine Lavin, and singer-songwriter Nanci Griffith to the label. Griffith's Rounder debut, Once in a Very Blue Moon, marked the "emergence of a major talent." Critically acclaimed, the album was the foundation for Griffith's 1993 success with the Grammy Award-winning Other Voices, Other Rooms (released by Elektra).

Largely responsible for Rounder's A&R, Irwin listened to every demo tape that the label was sent. He first heard Alison Krauss in 1984 on a demo of the band Classical Grass, later known as Union Station, and Krauss—who mainly played fiddle and contributed vocal harmonies—sang lead on a gospel song. Irwin, taken with her voice, was interested in Krauss as a solo artist, and signed her to Rounder at 14. Once on the roster, Irwin brought Krauss (and her parents) to Nashville to find a producer for her Rounder debut. The album, Too Late to Cry, was released in 1987, when Krauss was 16. It was followed by the Union Station album Two Highways in 1989.

=== 1990s: Zoe Records, Mercury Records, Music for Little People, Liquid Audio ===
Rounder released I've Got That Old Feeling, Krauss' second solo album, in 1990. It was her first album to hit the Billboard charts, and earned Krauss a 1991 Grammy Award—her first—in the Best Bluegrass album category. Over the course of the decade, Krauss would release a second solo album, 1999's Forget About It, and two albums with Union Station, Everytime You Say Goodbye (1992) and So Long So Wrong. (1997). Forget About It and So Long So Wrong were certified gold. Krauss won four Grammys as a solo artist and Union Station won five during the 1990s.

In 1991, producer Ron Levy partnered with Rounder to create and distribute the Bullseye Blues label, releasing music from Lowell Fulson, Smokin' Joe Kubek and Charles Brown. In the winter of that year, the company merged with Rykodisc distribution's East Side Digital to form REP Co. along with Precision Sound. Rykodisc later restructured to form Distribution North America, which would handle many of Rounder's albums.

Rounder acquired the children's label, Music for Little People, in 1994. Renamed Rounder Kids, it functioned as a separate corporation within the Rounder Records Group. Artists including Raffi released records through Rounder Kids, which distributed labels 250 labels and 2200 titles.

Rounder bought the Chicago-based Flying Fish Records in fall of 1995. The label, founded in 1974 by Rounder associate Bruce Kaplan, had a catalog of over 500 records by artists including Sweet Honey in the Rock, Pete Seeger, and Doc Watson at the time of its acquisition. That same year, Krauss released the career retrospective, Now That I've Found You. The album charted at #2 on the country charts, and hit the top fifteen on the pop charts. It sold two million copies and received two Grammy Awards.

In 1997, the founders appointed Rounder's first president and CEO, John Virant, who had been the label's general counsel since 1992. Among other initiatives, Virant conceived of and oversaw the creation of a pop music imprint, Zoë, named for his daughter. Artists including Blake Babies, Juliana Hatfield, Kay Hanley and Sarah Harmer released records on the imprint.

A distribution agreement with Polygram's Mercury Records was signed in 1998. Expected to increase the sales of new releases of artists such as Juliana Hatfield, the PolyGram Group Distribution affiliate handled more than a third of Rounder's titles. Less prominent titles were sold through distributors DNA and Bayside.

In April 1999, the company signed an agreement with Liquid Audio, Inc. for digital distribution of its music over the Internet. By then, Mercury's parent company PolyGram had been acquired by Universal. Universal Music and Video Distribution unit sold Rounder's bigger titles.

=== 2000s: Raising Sand, Rounder Books, Mary Chapin Carpenter, Steve Martin ===
While polka was a mainstay of Rounder's catalog, in 2001 the company moved the musical style to the mainstream with the release of Jimmy Sturr's Gone Polka album. "Unabashed polka fan," Willie Nelson, whose first bands played polka, often recorded on Sturr's albums, and four songs on Gone Polka featured Nelson's vocals, illustrating "the happy cross-cultural union between the Lone Star State and Eastern Europe."

In 2002, Rounder signed a deal with Provident Music Distribution to sell Rounder products to Christian retailers, and began marketing the recordings of jazz saxophonist Branford Marsalis's Marsalis Music label.

Rounder Books was created in Spring 2004. The division's first releases were Nowlin's baseball biography Mr. Red Sox: The Johnny Pesky Story, and a book of collected fan essays, edited by Nowlin and Cecelia Tan. Nowlin, along with other co-writers, released another three Red Sox-themed books over the next six years. Other titles from Rounder Books included a children's book by Raffi, Everybody Grows, and the company's bestseller, Rush drummer/lyricist Neil Peart's Roadshow: Landscape with Drums—A Concert Tour by Motorcycle.

In 1986, although pursued by Rounder, Mary Chapin Carpenter chose instead to sign with Columbia Records. Twenty years later, in 2006, she signed with Rounder. Moving beyond the country music she was associated with, on Rounder she released what many fans and critics regarded as the best albums of her career.

Echoing the early achievements of Hazel Dickens and Alison Krauss, in the male-dominated field of bluegrass music, in 2007 Rounder released Crowd Favorites, a compilation of six albums by Claire Lynch. The album earned multiple International Bluegrass Music Association (IBMA) awards and Lynch was inducted into the Alabama Bluegrass Hall of Fame. In 2005, Lynn Morris, Alecia Nugent and Rhonda Vincent were honored by the Society for the Preservation of Bluegrass Music of America.

The Robert Plant/Alison Krauss album, Raising Sand, in 2007, was one of Rounder's biggest hits both commercially and critically. It won five Grammys, including Album of the Year, Best Contemporary Folk/Americana Album, Record of the Year (for "Please Read the Letter"), Best Pop Collaboration with Vocals for "Rich Woman," and Best Country Collaboration with Vocals for "Killing the Blues". Krauss was the sixth female artist to win five Grammys in a single night. Raising Sand was certified platinum in March 2008.

In 2009, Rounder reissued a series of 1920s and 1930s Carter Family recordings. The same year, the label launched what would become a 100-disc reissue series compiled by musicologist Alan Lomax whose archival project began in 1938 with the taping of Jelly Roll Morton, and ultimately included Lead Belly, Muddy Waters, Woody Guthrie, and many others. Steve Martin also released the first of his Rounder albums, The Crow: New Songs for the Five-String Banjo in 2009.

Releasing about 100 albums per year by the end of the decade, Rounder's catalog had grown to include Del McCoury, David Grisman, the Whitstein Brothers, Madeleine Peyroux, and James King, as well as supergroups Dreadful Snakes (Jerry Douglas, Pat Enright, Bela Fleck, Mark Hembree, Blaine Sprouse, and Roland White) and Longview (Dudley Connell, James King, Don Rigsby, Joe Mullins, Glen Duncan, and Marshall Wilborn), and the compilation Oh Sister. Artists including Robert Plant, Dolores O'Riordan, Ann Wilson, Fleck, Minnie Driver, Rush, Cowboy Junkies, Griffith, Laura Nyro, Fairport Convention, Linda Thompson, Boz Scaggs, Nelson, Skaggs, and Joe Diffie among others, recorded for Rounder during the 2000s.

=== 2010s: Concord, 40th anniversary, John Strohm ===
In April 2010, Los Angeles, California–based Concord Music Group acquired Rounder Records, adding the latter's 3,000 titles to its own 10,000. Irwin, Nowlin and Leighton-Levy remained in creative and advisory roles. In an interview with The Boston Globe, Leighton-Levy said: "We felt this was better than simply trying to soldier on alone. It's not an exit strategy. Concord acquired Rounder wanting it to continue what it is doing."

To celebrate its 40th anniversary, Rounder produced a concert at the Grand Ole Opry. Broadcast on PBS in March 2010, The Rounder Records 40th Anniversary Concert was released on DVD to benefit NARAS's Grammy in the Schools Program. Performers included Krauss, Carpenter, Martin, Thomas, Fleck, and Peyroux.

In 2014, Rounder moved from Cambridge to Nashville, Concord's base of operations.

In April 2015, Concord merged its new acquisition, the North Carolina–based label, Sugar Hill, with the Rounder Label Group. Founded in the late 1970s, the Sugar Hill catalog included records by Ricky Skaggs, Lee Ann Womack, Sarah Jarosz, Liz Longley, Corey Smith, Kasey Chambers, Sam Bush, moe., and Bryan Sutton and Black Prairie.

John Strohm, a musician and entertainment lawyer, became Rounder's president in 2017, as Virant moved to a senior creative role. An attorney at the Nashville law firm Loeb & Loeb at the time, Strohm had been instrumental in developing the careers of Alabama Shakes, Sturgill Simpson, The Civil Wars, Dawes, and Bon Iver, among others. A guitarist, drummer, and songwriter, Strohm spent half of his career playing in critically acclaimed alternative bands including the Blake Babies, Antenna, and the Lemonheads. He also released two albums as a solo artist, Vestavia in (1999) and Everyday Life in 2007.

== Subsidiary labels ==
- Bullseye Blues
- Easydisc
- Flying Fish Records
- Greenhays
- Heartbeat Records
- Henry Street
- Music for Little People
- Philo Records
- Rounder Select
- Rounder Specials
- Sugar Hill Records
- Upstart
- Varrick
- Zoë Records

== See also ==
- List of record labels

== Relevant literature ==
- Nowlin, Bill. 2021. Vinyl Ventures: My Fifty Years at Rounder Records. Sheffield: Equinox Publishing.
