= List of UK top-ten albums in 2011 =

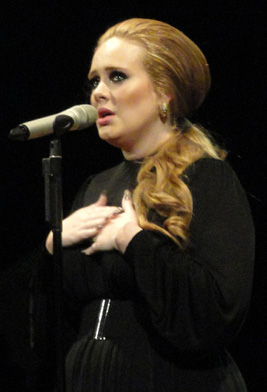
Adele had the best-selling album of 2011 with her second album 21, which spent 76 weeks in the top 10, with 23 non-consecutive weeks at number-one. Her debut album 19, which peaked at number-one on its initial release in 2008, also re-entered the top 10 this year and finished 2011 as the year's fourth best selling album.

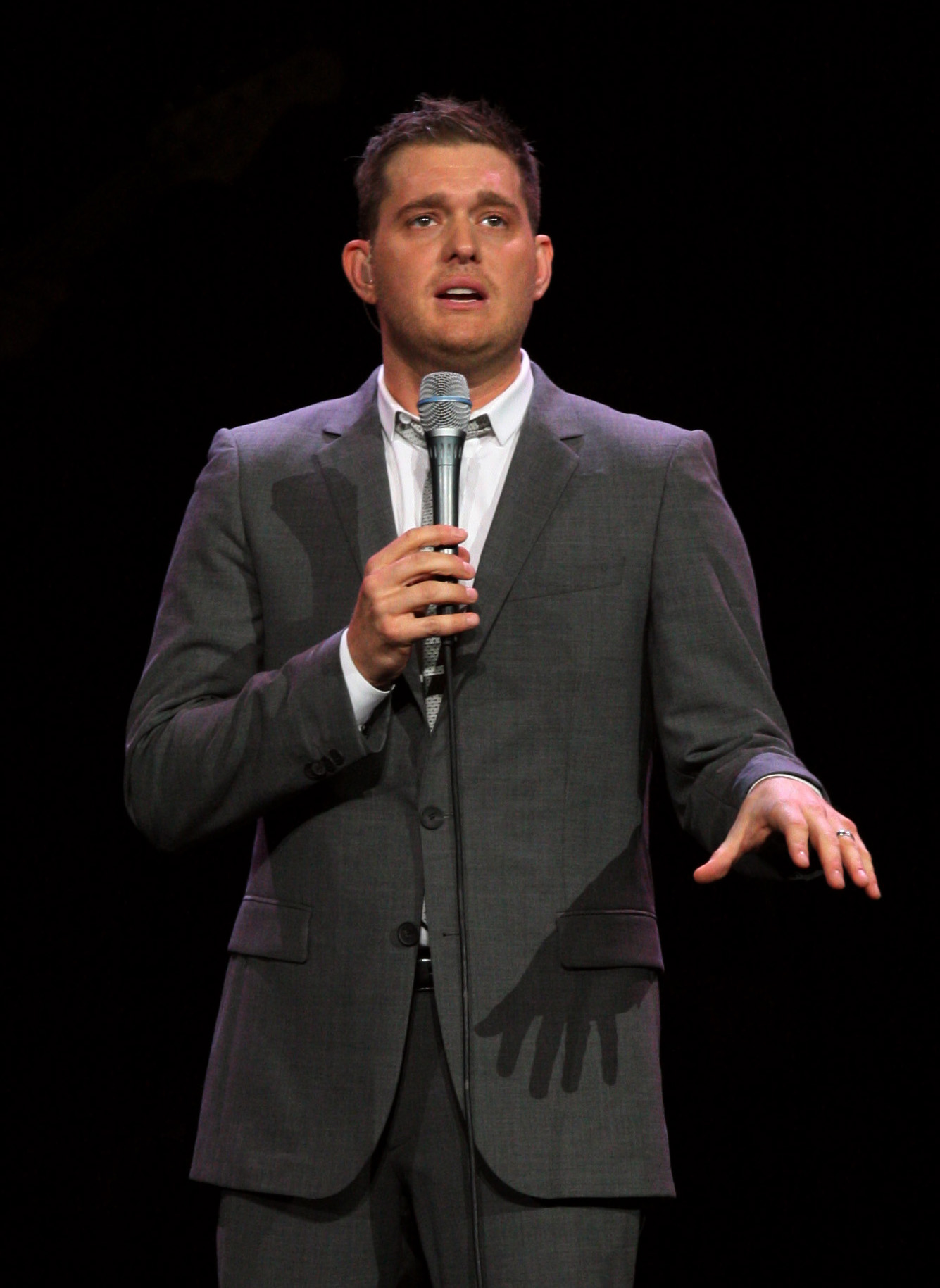
Michael Bublé's Christmas spent three non-consecutive weeks at number-one this year and became the year's second best selling album.

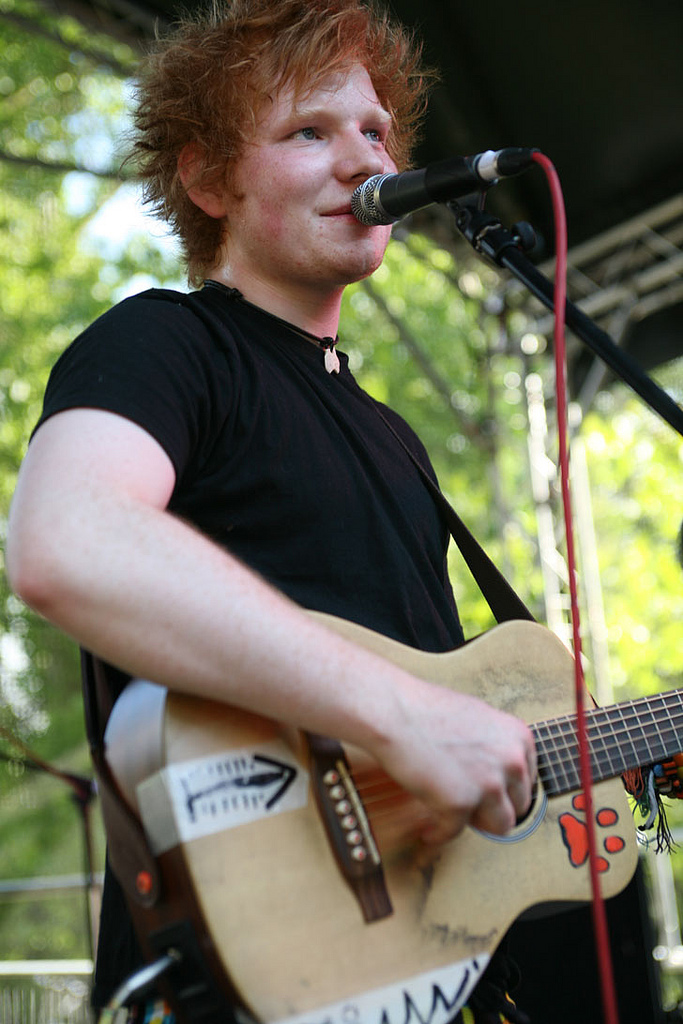
Ed Sheeran went straight to number-one in September 2011 with his debut album +.

The UK Albums Chart is one of many music charts compiled by the Official Charts Company that calculates the best-selling albums of the week in the United Kingdom. Since 2004 the chart has been based on the sales of both physical albums and digital downloads. This list shows albums that peaked in the Top 10 of the UK Albums Chart during 2011, as well as albums which peaked in 2010 and 2012 but were in the top 10 in 2011. The entry date is when the album appeared in the top 10 for the first time (week ending, as published by the Official Charts Company, which is six days after the chart is announced).

One-hundred and fifty-three albums were in the top ten this year. One album from 2009 and nineteen albums from 2010 remained in the top 10 for several weeks at the beginning of the year, while Stereo Typical by Rizzle Kicks was released in 2011 but did not reach its peak until 2012. Loud by Rihanna, Sigh No More by Mumford & Sons, The Beginning by The Black Eyed Peas and The Lady Killer by CeeLo Green were the albums from 2010 to reach their peak in 2011. Twelve artists scored multiple entries in the top 10 in 2011. Drake, Ed Sheeran, Jessie J, Matt Cardle, One Direction, Rebecca Ferguson and Rizzle Kicks. were among the many artists who achieved their first UK charting top 10 album in 2011.

The 2010 Christmas number-one album, Progress by Take That, remained at the top spot for the first week of 2011. The first new number-one album of the year was Loud by Rihanna. Overall, twenty-five different albums peaked at number-one in 2011, with Amy Winehouse (2) having the most albums hitting that position.

== Background ==
=== Multiple entries ===
One-hundred and fifty-three albums charted in the top 10 in 2011, with one-hundred and thirty-five albums reaching their peak this year (including 19, All Over the World: The Very Best of Electric Light Orchestra, Back to Black, Frank and Nevermind, which charted in previous years but reached a peak on their latest chart run).

Twelve artists scored multiple entries in the top 10 in 2011. Amy Winehouse and Glee cast both had four top 10 albums in 2011. Adele, Alfie Boe, Daniel O'Donnell, JLS, Kate Bush, Michael Bublé, Olly Murs, Rihanna, Susan Boyle and The Wanted were the acts who had two top 10 albums this year. Alfie Boe, Daniel O'Donnell and Kate Bush's two entries were both released this year, with Frank by Amy Winehouse returning after missing the top 10 when it was first released in 2003 and 19 by Adele and Back to Black by Amy Winehouse both returning after making the top ten before.

=== Chart debuts ===
Thirty-eight artists achieved their first top 10 album in 2011 as a lead artist. Alfie Boe had one other entry in his breakthrough year.

The following table (collapsed on desktop site) does not include acts who had previously charted as part of a group and secured their first top 10 solo album, or featured appearances on compilations or other artists recordings.

Artist	Number of top 10s	First entry	Chart position	Other entries
Bruno Mars	1	Doo-Wops & Hooligans	1	—
Imelda May	1	Mayhem	7	—
Alfie Boe	2	Bring Him Home	9	Alfie (6)
Chase & Status	1	No More Idols	2	—
James Blake	1	James Blake	9	—
Jessie J	1	Who You Are	2	—
Beady Eye	1	Different Gear, Still Speeding	3	—
Clare Maguire	1	Light After Dark	7	—
Alexis Jordan	1	Alexis Jordan	9	—
The Vaccines	1	What Did You Expect from The Vaccines?	4	—
The Overtones	1	Good Ol' Fashioned Love	4	—
Mary Byrne	1	Mine & Yours	6	—
Katy B	1	On a Mission	2	—
The Wombats	1	This Modern Glitch	3	—
Hugh Laurie	1	Let Them Talk	2	—
Friendly Fires	1	Pala	6	—
Caro Emerald	1	Deleted Scenes from the Cutting Room Floor	4	—
The Pierces	1	You & I	4	—
Aloe Blacc	1	Good Things	8	—
Jackie Evancho	1	Dream with Me	4	—
Wonderland	1	Wonderland	8	—
Bad Meets Evil	1	Hell: The Sequel (EP)	7	—
Bon Iver	1	Bon Iver	4	—
The Horrors	1	Skying	5	—
LMFAO	1	Sorry for Party Rocking	8	—
Nero	1	Welcome Reality	1	—
Wretch 32	1	Black and White	4	—
Lil Wayne	1	Tha Carter IV	8	—
Ed Sheeran	1	+	1	—
Christina Perri	1	Lovestrong	9	—
Ben Howard	1	Every Kingdom	7	—
Noel Gallagher's High Flying Birds	1	Noel Gallagher's High Flying Birds	1	—
Matt Cardle	1	Letters	6	—
Rizzle Kicks	1	Stereo Typical	5	—
Cher Lloyd	1	Sticks + Stones	4	—
Drake	1	Take Care	5	—
One Direction	1	Up All Night	2	—
Rebecca Ferguson	1	Heaven	3	—

Notes

The group Beady Eye was fronted by Liam Gallagher, one half of the Gallagher brothers from Oasis. Their entry Different Gear, Still Speeding went straight in at number 3. His brother Noel Gallagher made the chart again with his group Noel Gallagher's High Flying Birds, topping the rankings with their self-titled album. Nicole Scherzinger charted at number 8 with her debut solo album Killer Love, adding to her success as part of The Pussycat Dolls. Charlie Simpson previously featured in the line-ups of Busted and Fightstar. Young Pilgrim marked his first time in the top 10 as a solo artist.

=== Soundtracks ===
The cast of the TV series Glee had four top-ten albums in 2011. This included Glee: The Music Presents the Warblers, Glee: The Music, Volume 4, Glee: The Music, Volume 5 and Glee: The Music, Volume 6.

=== Best-selling albums ===
Adele had the best-selling album of the year with 21. The album spent 76 weeks in the top 10 (including 23 weeks at number one), sold over 3.772 million copies and was certified 14× platinum by the BPI. Christmas by Michael Bublé came in second place. Bruno Mars' Doo-Wops & Hooligans, 19 from Adele and Mylo Xyloto by Coldplay made up the top five. Albums by Rihanna (Loud), Lady Gaga, Jessie J, Ed Sheeran and Rihanna (Talk That Talk) were also in the top ten best-selling albums of the year.

== Top-ten albums ==
Key

Symbol	Meaning
‡	Album peaked in 2010 but still in chart in 2011.
♦	Album released in 2011 but peaked in 2012.
(#)	Year-end top-ten album position and rank
Entered	The date that the album first appeared in the chart.
Peak	Highest position that the album reached in the UK Albums Chart.

Entered (week ending)	Weeks in top 10	Album	Artist	Peak	Peak reached (week ending)	Weeks at peak
Albums in 2009
31 October 2009	36	Crazy Love ‡	Michael Bublé	1	2 January 2010	1
Albums in 2010
16 January 2010	32	Sigh No More	Mumford & Sons	2	26 February 2011	1
13 March 2010	8	Lights ‡	Ellie Goulding	1	13 March 2010	1
24 April 2010	30	The Defamation of Strickland Banks ‡	Plan B	1	24 April 2010	2
24 July 2010	12	Eliza Doolittle ‡	Eliza Doolittle	3	24 July 2010	1
11 September 2010	12	Teenage Dream ‡	Katy Perry	1	11 September 2010	1
2 October 2010	2	Hands All Over ‡	Maroon 5	6	2 October 2010	1
16 October 2010	10	Disc-Overy ‡	Tinie Tempah	1	16 October 2010	1
30 October 2010	9	Come Around Sundown ‡	Kings of Leon	1	30 October 2010	2
6 November 2010	2	The Wanted ‡	The Wanted	4	6 November 2010	1
13 November 2010	8	Greatest Hits ‡	Bon Jovi	2	13 November 2010	2
13 November 2010	7	Seasons of My Soul ‡	Rumer	3	13 November 2010	1
20 November 2010	7	The Gift ‡	Susan Boyle	1	20 November 2010	1
20 November 2010	13	The Lady Killer	CeeLo Green	3	22 January 2011	1
27 November 2010	17	Progress ‡	Take That	1	27 November 2010	7
27 November 2010	32	Loud (#6)	Rihanna	1	8 January 2011	3
4 December 2010	6	Outta This World ‡	JLS	2	4 December 2010	1
11 December 2010	4	Olly Murs ‡	Olly Murs	2	11 December 2010	1
18 December 2010	3	The Beginning	The Black Eyed Peas	8	1 January 2011	1
25 December 2010	2	Michael ‡	Michael Jackson	4	25 December 2010	1
Albums in 2011
22 January 2011	37	19 (#4)	Adele	2	5 March 2011	5
29 January 2011	41	Doo-Wops & Hooligans (#3)	Bruno Mars	1	29 January 2011	2
29 January 2011	1	Ritual	White Lies	3	29 January 2011	1
5 February 2011	76	21 (#1)	Adele	1	5 February 2011	23
5 February 2011	2	Mayhem	Imelda May	7	5 February 2011	1
5 February 2011	1	Bring Him Home	Alfie Boe	9	5 February 2011	1
12 February 2011	10	No More Idols	Chase & Status	2	12 February 2011	1
12 February 2011	4	Simply Eva	Eva Cassidy	4	19 February 2011	1
19 February 2011	1	Computers and Blues	The Streets	8	19 February 2011	1
19 February 2011	1	James Blake	James Blake	9	19 February 2011	1
26 February 2011	1	Let England Shake	PJ Harvey	8	26 February 2011	1
5 March 2011	1	Glee: The Music, Volume 4	Glee cast	4	5 March 2011	1
12 March 2011	34	Who You Are (#8)	Jessie J	2	12 March 2011	1
12 March 2011	2	Different Gear, Still Speeding	Beady Eye	3	12 March 2011	1
12 March 2011	1	Light After Dark	Clare Maguire	7	12 March 2011	1
12 March 2011	1	Alexis Jordan	Alexis Jordan	9	12 March 2011	1
19 March 2011	5	Build a Rocket Boys!	Elbow	2	19 March 2011	1
19 March 2011	1	Collapse into Now	R.E.M.	5	19 March 2011	1
19 March 2011	1	Last Night on Earth	Noah and the Whale	8	19 March 2011	1
19 March 2011	1	Goodbye Lullaby	Avril Lavigne	9	19 March 2011	1
26 March 2011	4	What Did You Expect from The Vaccines?	The Vaccines	4	26 March 2011	1
26 March 2011	4	Good Ol' Fashioned Love	The Overtones	4	9 April 2011	1
26 March 2011	1	Moon Over Ireland	Daniel O'Donnell	9	26 March 2011	1
26 March 2011	1	Heroes	Michael Ball	10	26 March 2011	1
2 April 2011	1	Angles	The Strokes	3	2 April 2011	1
2 April 2011	2	When Ronan Met Burt	Ronan Keating & Burt Bacharach	3	9 April 2011	1
2 April 2011	1	Killer Love	Nicole Scherzinger	8	2 April 2011	1
2 April 2011	1	F.A.M.E.	Chris Brown	10	2 April 2011	1
9 April 2011	1	Mine & Yours	Mary Byrne	6	9 April 2011	1
9 April 2011	2	The King of Limbs	Radiohead	7	9 April 2011	2
9 April 2011	1	Femme Fatale	Britney Spears	8	9 April 2011	1
16 April 2011	3	On a Mission	Katy B	2	16 April 2011	1
16 April 2011	1	Euphoric Heartbreak	Glasvegas	10	16 April 2011	1
23 April 2011	7	Wasting Light	Foo Fighters	1	23 April 2011	1
23 April 2011	2	Glee: The Music, Volume 5	Glee cast	4	23 April 2011	1
30 April 2011	1	Transition	Chipmunk	10	30 April 2011	1
7 May 2011	1	This Modern Glitch	The Wombats	3	7 May 2011	1
14 May 2011	2	Helplessness Blues	Fleet Foxes	2	14 May 2011	1
14 May 2011	1	Love?	Jennifer Lopez	6	14 May 2011	1
14 May 2011	1	Hot Sauce Committee Part Two	Beastie Boys	9	14 May 2011	1
21 May 2011	3	Let Them Talk	Hugh Laurie	2	21 May 2011	1
21 May 2011	1	Glee: The Music Presents the Warblers	Glee cast	7	21 May 2011	1
21 May 2011	1	The Ultimate Collection	Sade	8	21 May 2011	1
28 May 2011	1	Director's Cut	Kate Bush	2	28 May 2011	1
28 May 2011	1	Pala	Friendly Fires	6	28 May 2011	1
28 May 2011	10	Deleted Scenes from the Cutting Room Floor	Caro Emerald	4	30 July 2011	1
4 June 2011	12	Born This Way (#7)	Lady Gaga	1	4 June 2011	3
4 June 2011	1	World's On Fire	The Prodigy	5	4 June 2011	1
11 June 2011	1	You & I	The Pierces	4	11 June 2011	1
11 June 2011	3	You Can't Teach an Old Dog New Tricks	Seasick Steve	6	11 June 2011	3
11 June 2011	1	Good Things	Aloe Blacc	8	11 June 2011	1
11 June 2011	1	Quid Pro Quo	Status Quo	10	11 June 2011	1
18 June 2011	3	Suck It and See	Arctic Monkeys	1	18 June 2011	1
18 June 2011	1	Dream with Me	Jackie Evancho	4	18 June 2011	1
18 June 2011	1	Glee: The Music, Volume 6	Glee cast	6	18 June 2011	1
18 June 2011	1	Wonderland	Wonderland	8	18 June 2011	1
25 June 2011	1	So Beautiful or So What	Paul Simon	6	25 June 2011	1
25 June 2011	2	Hell: The Sequel (EP)	Bad Meets Evil	7	25 June 2011	1
25 June 2011	1	All Over the World: The Very Best of Electric Light Orchestra	Electric Light Orchestra	10	25 June 2011	1
2 July 2011	1	Bon Iver	Bon Iver	4	2 July 2011	1
9 July 2011	11	4	Beyoncé	1	9 July 2011	2
9 July 2011	1	Revolutions: Live at Wembley	Biffy Clyro	9	9 July 2011	1
9 July 2011	1	The Future Is Medieval	Kaiser Chiefs	10	9 July 2011	1
23 July 2011	1	Skying	The Horrors	5	23 July 2011	1
30 July 2011	1	Sorry for Party Rocking	LMFAO	8	30 July 2011	1
6 August 2011	6	Back to Black	Amy Winehouse	1	6 August 2011	3
6 August 2011	3	Frank	Amy Winehouse	3	13 August 2011	1
6 August 2011	1	Frank/Back to Black	Amy Winehouse	10	6 August 2011	1
20 August 2011	4	Watch the Throne	Jay-Z & Kanye West	3	20 August 2011	1
20 August 2011	1	The Best of Randy Crawford	Randy Crawford	7	20 August 2011	1
27 August 2011	2	Welcome Reality	Nero	1	27 August 2011	1
27 August 2011	1	Young Pilgrim	Charlie Simpson	6	27 August 2011	1
27 August 2011	1	The Ultimate Collection	John Denver	7	27 August 2011	1
3 September 2011	5	Echoes	Will Young	1	3 September 2011	1
3 September 2011	6	Classic	Joe McElderry	2	3 September 2011	1
3 September 2011	1	Black and White	Wretch 32	4	3 September 2011	1
3 September 2011	1	What Matters Most	Barbra Streisand	7	3 September 2011	1
3 September 2011	1	Killer Sounds	Hard-Fi	9	3 September 2011	1
10 September 2011	3	I'm with You	Red Hot Chili Peppers	1	10 September 2011	1
10 September 2011	15	Nothing but the Beat	David Guetta	2	10 September 2011	3
10 September 2011	1	A Different Kind of Fix	Bombay Bicycle Club	6	10 September 2011	1
10 September 2011	1	Tha Carter IV	Lil Wayne	8	10 September 2011	1
10 September 2011	1	Better Day	Dolly Parton	9	10 September 2011	1
17 September 2011	4	Playing in the Shadows	Example	1	17 September 2011	1
17 September 2011	1	1	The Beatles	6	17 September 2011	1
17 September 2011	1	My Heart	Doris Day	9	17 September 2011	1
24 September 2011	49	+ (#9)	Ed Sheeran	1	24 September 2011	3
24 September 2011	1	A Creature I Don't Know	Laura Marling	4	24 September 2011	1
24 September 2011	1	Junk of the Heart	The Kooks	10	24 September 2011	1
1 October 2011	4	Velociraptor!	Kasabian	1	1 October 2011	1
1 October 2011	2	Duets II	Tony Bennett	5	1 October 2011	1
1 October 2011	1	Lovestrong	Christina Perri	9	1 October 2011	1
8 October 2011	4	The Awakening	James Morrison	1	8 October 2011	2
8 October 2011	1	Nevermind	Nirvana	5	8 October 2011	1
8 October 2011	1	Neighborhoods	Blink-182	6	8 October 2011	1
15 October 2011	1	Sinners Never Sleep	You Me at Six	3	15 October 2011	1
15 October 2011	1	Own the Night	Lady Antebellum	4	15 October 2011	1
15 October 2011	1	Every Kingdom	Ben Howard	7	15 October 2011	1
22 October 2011	3	The Ultimate Collection	Steps	1	22 October 2011	1
22 October 2011	1	Evanescence	Evanescence	4	22 October 2011	1
22 October 2011	1	Daydream	Katherine Jenkins	6	22 October 2011	1
22 October 2011	1	Future History	Jason Derulo	7	22 October 2011	1
22 October 2011	1	Ashes & Fire	Ryan Adams	9	22 October 2011	1
22 October 2011	1	Soulicious	Cliff Richard	10	22 October 2011	1
29 October 2011	7	Noel Gallagher's High Flying Birds	Noel Gallagher's High Flying Birds	1	29 October 2011	1
29 October 2011	2	Letters	Matt Cardle	2	29 October 2011	1
29 October 2011	1	The Ultimate Collection	Daniel O'Donnell	7	29 October 2011	1
5 November 2011	28	Mylo Xyloto (#5)	Coldplay	1	5 November 2011	1
5 November 2011	9	Christmas (#2)	Michael Bublé	1	26 November 2011	3
5 November 2011	1	Stronger	Kelly Clarkson	5	5 November 2011	1
5 November 2011	1	Bad as Me	Tom Waits	10	5 November 2011	1
12 November 2011	7	Ceremonials	Florence + The Machine	1	12 November 2011	1
12 November 2011	1	At Your Inconvenience	Professor Green	3	12 November 2011	1
12 November 2011	1	Alfie	Alfie Boe	6	12 November 2011	1
12 November 2011	4	Stereo Typical ♦	Rizzle Kicks	5	4 February 2012	1
12 November 2011	1	National Treasures – The Complete Singles	Manic Street Preachers	10	12 November 2011	1
19 November 2011	2	Someone to Watch Over Me	Susan Boyle	1	19 November 2011	1
19 November 2011	1	Sticks + Stones	Cher Lloyd	4	19 November 2011	1
19 November 2011	1	Battleground	The Wanted	5	19 November 2011	1
19 November 2011	2	And the Waltz Goes On	André Rieu & the Johann Strauss Orchestra	7	19 November 2011	1
26 November 2011	2	Jukebox	JLS	2	26 November 2011	1
26 November 2011	1	Fallen Empires	Snow Patrol	3	26 November 2011	1
26 November 2011	1	Take Care	Drake	5	26 November 2011	1
3 December 2011	18	Talk That Talk (#10)	Rihanna	1	3 December 2011	2
3 December 2011	7	Up All Night	One Direction	2	3 December 2011	1
3 December 2011	4	Greatest Hits	Westlife	4	3 December 2011	1
3 December 2011	1	50 Words for Snow	Kate Bush	5	3 December 2011	1
3 December 2011	1	Here and Now	Nickelback	10	3 December 2011	1
10 December 2011	9	In Case You Didn't Know	Olly Murs	1	10 December 2011	1
10 December 2011	1	Wicked Game	Il Divo	6	10 December 2011	1
17 December 2011	6	Lioness: Hidden Treasures	Amy Winehouse	1	17 December 2011	1
17 December 2011	9	Heaven	Rebecca Ferguson	3	17 December 2011	1

== Entries by artist ==
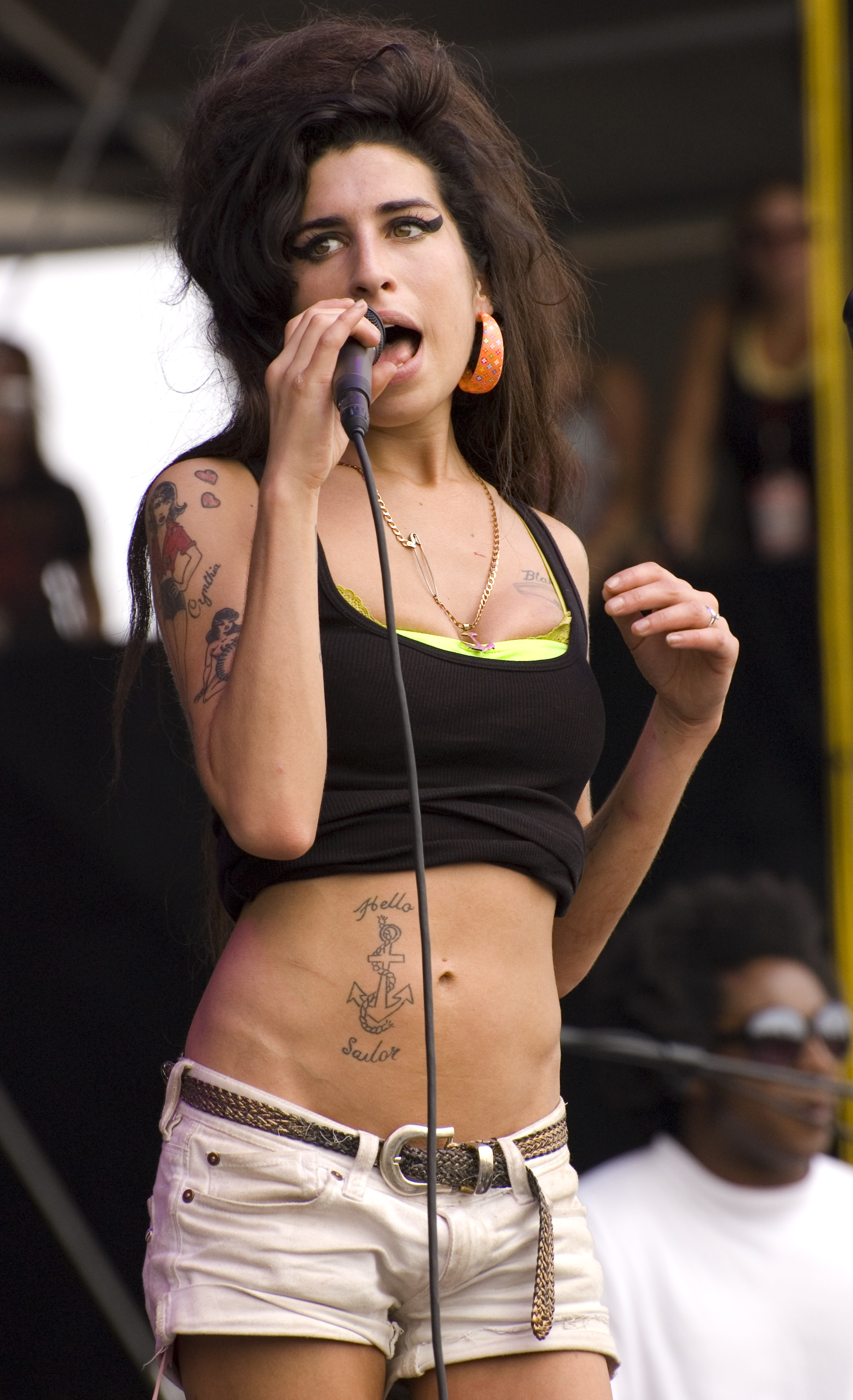
Following her death on 23 July of this year, Amy Winehouse's second album Back to Black returned to number-one in the UK charts for three weeks. Meanwhile, both her debut album Frank and the box set Frank/Back to Black entered the top 10 for the first time, peaking at numbers three and ten, respectively. In December, Winehouse's posthumous compilation album Lioness: Hidden Treasures debuted at number-one, becoming her fourth top 10 album of the year.

The following table shows artists who achieved two or more top 10 entries in 2011, including albums that reached their peak in 2010. The figures only include main artists, with featured artists and appearances on compilation albums not counted individually for each artist. The total number of weeks an artist spent in the top ten in 2011 is also shown.

Entries	Artist	Weeks	Albums
4	Amy Winehouse	9	Back to Black, Frank, Frank/Back to Black, Lioness: Hidden Treasures
4	Glee cast	5	Glee: The Music Presents the Warblers, Glee: The Music, Volume 4, Glee: The Music, Volume 5, Glee: The Music, Volume 6
2	Adele	51	19, 21
2	Alfie Boe	2	Alfie, Bring Him Home
2	Daniel O'Donnell	2	Moon Over Ireland, The Ultimate Collection
2	JLS	4	Jukebox, Outta This World
2	Kate Bush	2	50 Words for Snow, Director's Cut
2	Michael Bublé	12	Christmas, Crazy Love
2	Olly Murs	5	In Case You Didn't Know, Olly Murs
2	Rihanna	32	Loud, Talk That Talk
2	Susan Boyle	3	Someone to Watch Over Me, The Gift
2	The Wanted	2	Battleground, The Wanted

== Notes ==
- Stereo Typical reached its peak of number five on 4 February 2012 (week ending).
- Crazy Love re-entered the top 10 at number 7 on 16 April 2011 (week ending).
- JLS re-entered the top 10 at number 8 on 6 March 2010 (week ending).
- Sigh No More re-entered the top 10 at number 6 on 2 January 2011 (week ending) for 3 weeks and at number 2 on 26 February 2011 (week ending) for 3 weeks.
- Lights re-entered the top 10 at number 9 on 8 January 2011 (week ending) for 6 weeks and at number 10 on 14 May 2011 (week ending).
- The Defamation of Strickland Banks re-entered the top 10 at number 3 on 8 January 2011 (week ending) for 5 weeks and at number 7 on 26 February 2011 (week ending) for 2 weeks.
- Eliza Doolittle re-entered the top 10 at number 9 on 22 January 2011 (week ending) for 3 weeks.
- Teenage Dream re-entered the top 10 at number 5 on 30 October 2010 (week ending) for 2 weeks, at number 9 on 20 November 2010 (week ending) for 2 weeks, at number 8 on 8 January 2011 (week ending) for 2 weeks, at number 8 on 29 October 2011 (week ending) and at number 6 on 7 April 2012 (week ending).
- Hands All Over re-entered the top 10 at number 10 on 29 October 2011 (week ending).
- Disc-Overy re-entered the top 10 at number 4 on 8 January 2011 (week ending) for 4 weeks and at number 6 on 26 February 2011 (week ending) for 2 weeks.
- The Wanted re-entered the top 10 at number 5 on 8 January 2011 (week ending).
- Seasons of My Soul re-entered the top 10 at number 6 on 15 January 2011 (week ending) for 3 weeks and at number 9 on 12 February 2011 (week ending) for 2 weeks.
- The Lady Killer re-entered the top 10 at number 4 on 15 January 2011 (week ending) for 5 weeks, at number 9 on 5 March 2011 (week ending) for 2 weeks, at number 8 on 23 April 2011 (week ending) for 3 weeks, at number 9 on 16 July 2011 (week ending) and at number 8 on 22 October 2011 (week ending).
- Progress re-entered the top 10 at number 10 on 19 February 2011 (week ending) for 2 weeks, at number 9 on 11 June 2011 (week ending) and at number 3 on 25 June 2011 (week ending) for 5 weeks.
- Loud re-entered the top 10 at number 9 on 2 July 2011 (week ending), at number 8 on 16 July 2011 (week ending) for 3 weeks, at number 10 on 13 August 2011 (week ending) and at number 10 on 3 September 2011 (week ending).
- Outta This World re-entered the top 10 at number 10 on 5 March 2011 (week ending).
- 19 originally peaked at number-one upon its initial release in 2008.
- Doo-Wops & Hooligans re-entered the top 10 at number 8 on 16 April 2011 (week ending) for 10 weeks, at number 8 on 2 July 2011 (week ending) for 9 weeks, at number 10 on 17 September 2011 (week ending), at number 10 on 8 September 2011 (week ending) for 2 weeks, at number 9 on 29 October 2011 (week ending) for 2 weeks, at number 10 on 10 December 2011 (week ending) for 2 weeks and at number 2 on 7 January 2012 (week ending) for 6 weeks.
- 21 re-entered the top 10 at number 9 on 14 July 2012 (week ending) and at number 7 on 27 July 2012 (week ending) for 4 weeks.
- No More Idols re-entered the top 10 at number 10 on 7 May 2011 (week ending), at number 9 on 21 May 2011 (week ending) for 3 weeks, at number 9 on 30 July 2011 (week ending) for 3 weeks and at number 9 on 27 August 2011 (week ending).
- Simply Eva re-entered the top 10 at number 10 on 9 April 2011 (week ending).
- Who You Are re-entered the top 10 at number 6 on 9 July 2011 (week ending) for 2 weeks, at number 10 on 20 August 2011 (week ending), at number 10 on 7 January 2012 (week ending) for 2 weeks, at number 10 on 28 January 2012 (week ending) for 6 weeks, at number 5 on 7 April 2012 (week ending) for 6 weeks, at number 7 on 16 June 2012 (week ending) and at number 7 on 25 August 2012 (week ending).
- Build a Rocket Boys! re-entered the top 10 at number 9 on 16 April 2011 (week ending) for 2 weeks.
- What Did You Expect from the Vaccines re-entered the top 10 at number 6 on 21 January 2012 (week ending) for 3 weeks.
- The King of Limbs re-entered the top 10 at number 7 on 7 May 2011 (week ending).
- Wasting Light re-entered the top 10 at number 9 on 28 May 2011 (week ending) and at number 8 on 23 July 2011 (week ending) for 2 weeks.
- Deleted Scenes from the Cutting Room Floor re-entered the top 10 at number 8 on 25 June 2011 (week ending) for 7 weeks.
- All Over the World: The Very Best of Electric Light Orchestra originally peaked at number 6 upon its initial release in 2005.
- 4 re-entered the top 10 at number 6 on 14 January 2012 (week ending) for 3 weeks.
- Back to Black originally peaked at number 3 upon its initial release in 2006, rising to number-one the following year. It re-entered the top 10 following the death of Amy Winehouse.
- Frank originally peaked outside the top ten at number 60 upon its initial release in 2003, rising to its previous peak of number 13 the following year. It re-entered the top 10 following the death of Amy Winehouse.
- Frank/Back to Black was a double album featuring Amy Winehouse's two studio albums, Frank and Back to Black.
- Watch the Throne re-entered the top 10 at number 7 on 7 July 2012 (week ending) for 2 weeks.
- Nothing but the Beat re-entered the top 10 at number 9 on 11 February 2012 (week ending) for 2 weeks and at number 9 on 24 March 2012 (week ending) for 7 weeks.
- + re-entered the top 10 at number 8 on 26 May 2012 (week ending) and at number 2 on 16 June 2012 (week ending) for 13 weeks.
- Velociraptor! re-entered the top 10 at number 9 on 21 January 2012 (week ending).
- Duets II re-entered the top 10 at number 9 on 15 October 2011 (week ending).
- Noel Gallagher's High Flying Birds re-entered the top 10 at number 8 on 21 January 2012 (week ending) and at number 9 on 4 February 2012 (week ending) for 2 weeks.
- Mylo Xyloto re-entered the top 10 at number 6 on 3 March 2012 (week ending) for 3 weeks, at number 7 on 31 March 2012 (week ending) for 2 weeks, at number 5 on 16 June 2012 (week ending), at number 7 on 14 July 2012 (week ending) for 2 weeks and at number 4 on 22 September 2012 (week ending) for 2 weeks.
- Ceremonials re-entered the top 10 at number 8 on 28 January 2012 (week ending) for 2 weeks and at number 9 on 3 March 2012 (week ending) for 2 weeks.
- Stereo Typical re-entered the top 10 at number 9 on 28 January 2012 (week ending) for 3 weeks.
- Talk That Talk re-entered the top 10 at number 9 on 9 June 2012 (week ending) for weeks, at number 9 on 7 July 2012 (week ending) for 2 weeks, at number 6 on 28 July 2012 (week ending) for 7 weeks.
- Up All Night re-entered the top 10 at number 10 on 25 August 2012 (week ending).
- Greatest Hits (Westlife album) re-entered the top 10 at number 9 on 24 November 2011 (week ending) for 2 weeks.
- In Case You Didn't Know re-entered the top 10 at number 7 on 5 May 2012 (week ending) for 2 weeks.
- Heaven re-entered the top 10 at number 10 on 25 February 2012 (week ending), at number 6 on 19 May 2012 (week ending) for 2 weeks and at number 5 on 27 October 2012.
- Figure includes album that peaked in 2009.
- Figure includes album that peaked in 2010.
- Figure includes album that first charted in 2010 but peaked in 2011.

== See also ==
- 2011 in British music
- List of number-one albums from the 2000s (UK)
