= List of UK top-ten albums in 2010 =

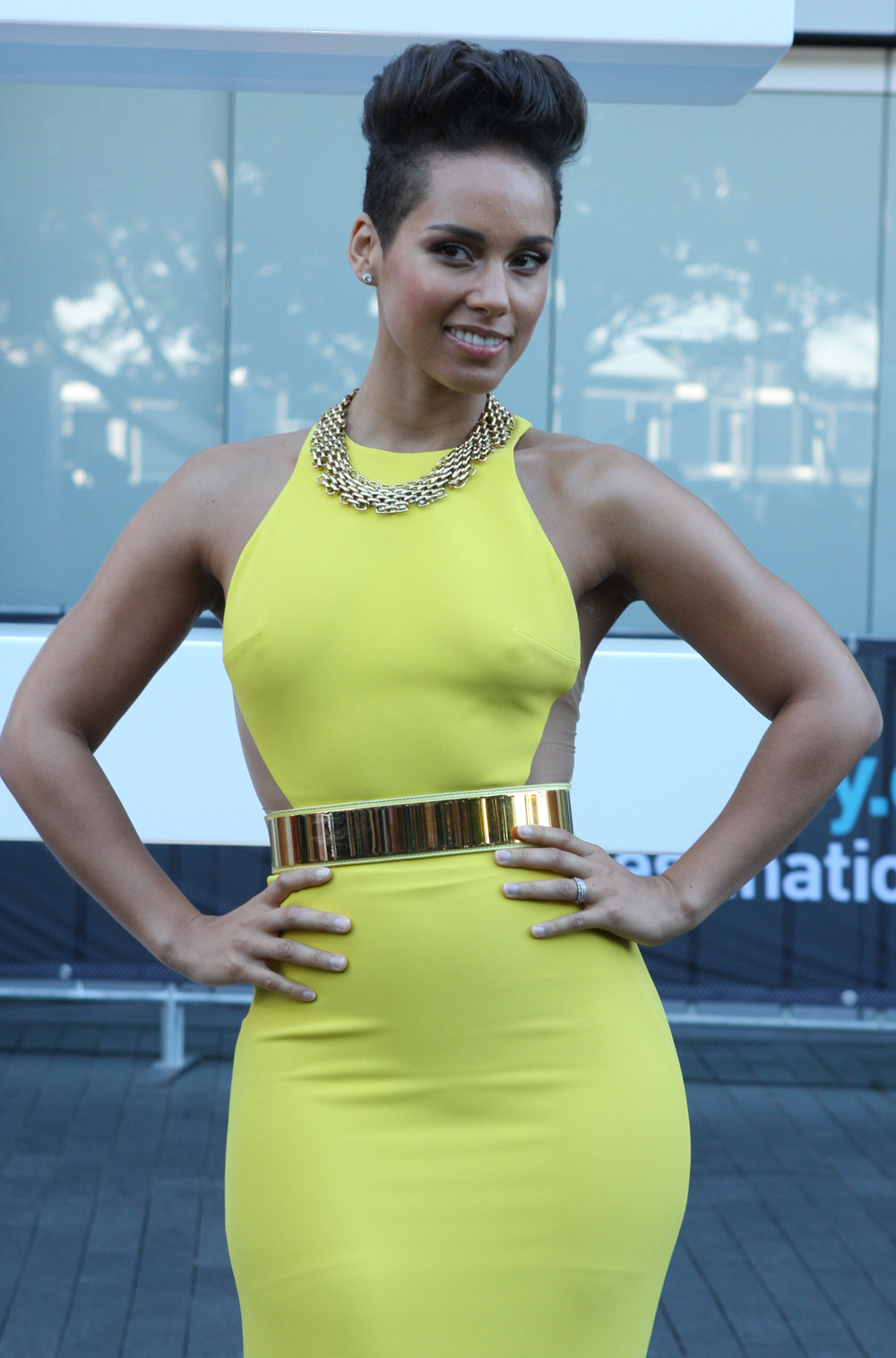
Alicia Keys' album The Element of Freedom spent 23 non-consecutive weeks in the top 10 in 2010, including two weeks at number-one in February, and became the year's seventh best-selling album.

The cast of the hit TV series Glee had the most top 10 albums this year, with five in total. The first of these, Glee: The Music, Volume 1, reached number-one for one week in February.

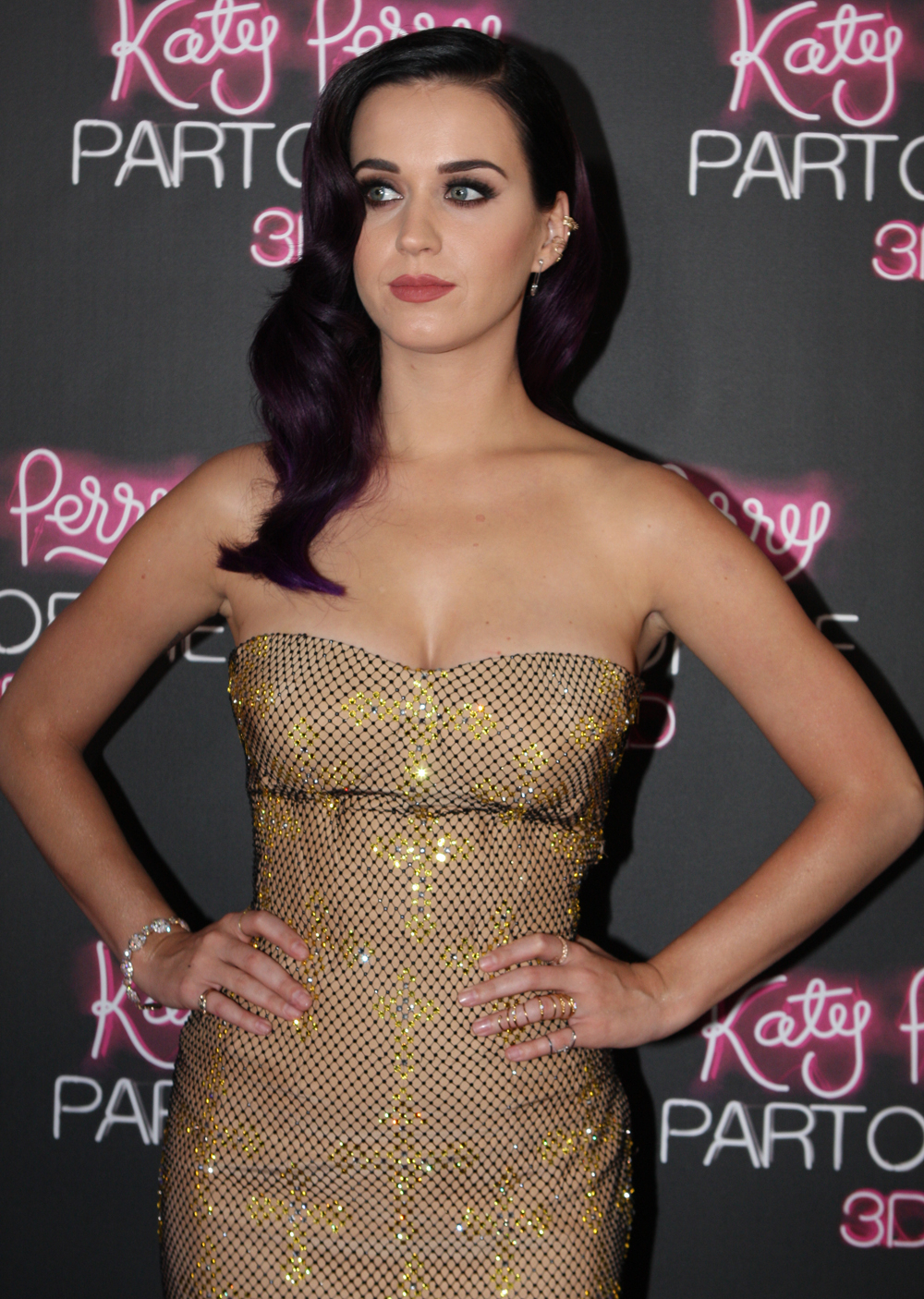
Katy Perry achieved her first UK number-one album in September 2010 with Teenage Dream.

The UK Albums Chart is one of many music charts compiled by the Official Charts Company that calculates the best-selling albums of the week in the United Kingdom. Since 2004 the chart has been based on the sales of both physical albums and digital downloads. This list shows albums that peaked in the Top 10 of the UK Albums Chart during 2010, as well as albums which peaked in 2009 and 2011 but were in the top 10 in 2010. The entry date is when the album appeared in the top 10 for the first time (week ending, as published by the Official Charts Company, which is six days after the chart is announced).

One-hundred and fifty-two albums were in the top ten this year. Sixteen albums from 2009 remained in the top 10 for several weeks at the beginning of the year, while Loud by Rihanna, Sigh No More by Mumford & Sons, The Beginning by The Black Eyed Peas and The Lady Killer by CeeLo Green were all released in 2010 but did not reach their peak until 2011. Crazy Love by Michael Bublé, Lungs by Florence + the Machine, Only Revolutions by Biffy Clyro and The Hits by Will Young were the albums from 2009 to reach their peak in 2010. Thirteen artists scored multiple entries in the top 10 in 2010. Ellie Goulding, Justin Bieber, Katy Perry, Olly Murs and Tinie Tempah were among the many artists who achieved their first UK charting top 10 album in 2010.

The first number-one album of the year was Crazy Love by Michael Bublé. Overall, thirty-two different albums peaked at number-one in 2010, with thirty-two unique artists hitting that position.

== Background ==
=== Multiple entries ===
One-hundred and fifty-two albums charted in the top 10 in 2010, with one-hundred and thirty-six albums reaching their peak this year (including 1962–1966, 1967–1970 and Simply Red 25: The Greatest Hits, which charted in previous years but reached a peak on their latest chart run).

Thirteen artists scored multiple entries in the top 10 in 2010. Glee cast had five top 10 albums, the most of any artist this year. André Rieu, The Beatles, The Black Eyed Peas, Cheryl, JLS, the Johann Strauss Orchestra, Lady Gaga, Peter Andre, Rihanna, Robbie Williams, Susan Boyle and Take That were the acts who had two top 10 albums this year. André Rieu, the Johann Strauss Orchestra, Peter Andre and Rihanna's two entries were both released this year, with 1962–1966 (The Red Album) and 1967–1970 (The Blue Album) by The Beatles returning after making the top ten before.

=== Chart debuts ===
Forty-five artists achieved their first top 10 album in 2010 as a lead artist. André Rieu and the Johann Strauss Orchestra both had one more hit album, while the Glee cast had four other entries in their breakthrough year.

The following table (collapsed on desktop site) does not include acts who had previously charted as part of a group and secured their first top 10 solo album, or featured appearances on compilations or other artists recordings.

Artist	Number of top 10s	First entry	Chart position	Other entries
Mumford & Sons	1	Sigh No More	2	—
Vampire Weekend	1	Contra	3	—
You Me at Six	1	Hold Me Down	5	—
André Rieu	2	Forever Vienna	2	Moonlight Serenade (4)
Johann Strauss Orchestra	2	Forever Vienna	2	Moonlight Serenade (4)
Delphic	1	Acolyte	8	—
Justin Bieber	1	My World	3	—
The Chipmunks	1	Alvin & the Chipmunks: The Squeakquel – Original Motion Picture Soundtrack	6	—
The Chipettes	1	Alvin & the Chipmunks: The Squeakquel – Original Motion Picture Soundtrack	6	—
Kesha	1	Animal	8	—
Glee cast	5	Glee: The Music, Volume 1	1	Glee: The Music, Volume 2 (2), Glee: The Music, The Power of Madonna (EP) (4), Glee: The Music, Volume 3 Showstoppers (3), Glee: The Music, Journey to Regionals (EP) (2)
Owl City	1	Ocean Eyes	7	—
Marina and the Diamonds	1	The Family Jewels	5	—
Ellie Goulding	1	Lights	1	—
Jason Derulo	1	Jason Derülo	8	—
Laura Marling	1	I Speak Because I Can	4	—
Plan B	1	The Defamation of Strickland Banks	1	—
Joshua Radin	1	Simple Times	9	—
Fisherman's Friends	1	Port Isaac's Fisherman's Friends	9	—
Diana Vickers	1	Songs from the Tainted Cherry Tree	1	—
Lady Antebellum	1	Need You Now	8	—
The National	1	High Violet	5	—
The Baseballs	1	Strike!	4	—
LCD Soundsystem	1	This Is Happening	7	—
The RAF Squadronaires	1	In the Mood	9	—
Example	1	Won't Go Quietly	4	—
Eliza Doolittle	1	Eliza Doolittle	3	—
Bombay Bicycle Club	1	Flaws	8	—
Professor Green	1	Alive Till I'm Dead	2	—
Avenged Sevenfold	1	Nightmare	5	—
The xx	1	xx	3	—
Katy Perry	1	Teenage Dream	1	—
The Pretty Reckless	1	Light Me Up	6	—
Disturbed	1	Asylum	7	—
Hurts	1	Happiness	4	—
Stone Sour	1	Audio Secrecy	6	—
Band of Joy	1	Band of Joy	3	—
Central Band of the Royal Air Force	1	Reach for the Skies	4	—
Tinie Tempah	1	Disc-Overy	1	—
Magnetic Man	1	Magnetic Man	5	—
Alter Bridge	1	AB III	9	—
Joe McElderry	1	Wide Awake	3	—
The Wanted	1	The Wanted	4	—
Rumer	1	Seasons of My Soul	3	—
Olly Murs	1	Olly Murs	2	—

Notes

Brandon Flowers released his debut solo album in 2010, the number-one hit Flamingo. He had recorded three other chart toppers with his group The Killers up to this point: Hot Fuss, Sam's Town and Day & Age.

Mark Ronson & The Business Intl. was a moniker used by Mark Ronson for his album Record Collection - he had already landed a top 10 album, Version, which had peaked at number 2 in 2007.

CeeLo Green took a solo album into the top 10 at the third attempt, The Lady Killer rising to number three at the start of 2011. He was in the group Gnarls Barkley who had a big hit in 2006 with St. Elsewhere.

=== Soundtracks ===
Soundtrack albums for various films entered the top 10 throughout the year. These included Alvin & the Chipmunks: The Squeakquel and Iron Man 2.

The cast of the TV series Glee also had five top-ten albums in 2010. This included Glee: The Music, Volume 1, Glee: The Music, Volume 2, Glee: The Music, Volume 3 Showstoppers, Glee: The Music, Journey to Regionals (EP) and Glee: The Music, The Power of Madonna (EP).

=== Best-selling albums ===
Take That had the best-selling album of the year with Progress. The album spent seventeen weeks in the top 10 (including seven weeks at number one), sold almost 1.633 million copies and was certified 6× platinum by the BPI. Crazy Love by Michael Bublé came in second place. Lady Gaga's The Fame, Loud from Rihanna and The Defamation of Strickland Banks by Plan B made up the top five. Albums by Paolo Nutini, Alicia Keys, Florence + the Machine, Eminem and Mumford & Sons were also in the top ten best-selling albums of the year.

== Top-ten albums ==
Key

Symbol	Meaning
‡	Album peaked in 2009 but still in chart in 2010.
♦	Album released in 2010 but peaked in 2011.
(#)	Year-end top-ten album position and rank
Entered	The date that the album first appeared in the chart.
Peak	Highest position that the album reached in the UK Albums Chart.

Entered (week ending)	Weeks in top 10	Album	Artist	Peak	Peak reached (week ending)	Weeks at peak
Albums in 2009
24 January 2009	71	The Fame ‡ (#3)	Lady Gaga	1	11 April 2009	7
13 June 2009	38	Sunny Side Up ‡ (#6)	Paolo Nutini	1	13 June 2009	4
20 June 2009	26	The E.N.D. ‡	The Black Eyed Peas	3	20 June 2009	8
18 July 2009	33	Lungs (#8)	Florence + the Machine	1	23 January 2010	2
26 September 2009	6	The Resistance ‡	Muse	1	26 September 2009	1
26 September 2009	6	The Blueprint 3 ‡	Jay-Z	4	26 September 2009	1
26 September 2009	6	Turn It Up ‡	Pixie Lott	6	26 September 2009	1
31 October 2009	36	Crazy Love (#2)	Michael Bublé	1	2 January 2010	1
7 November 2009	4	3 Words ‡	Cheryl	1	7 November 2009	2
21 November 2009	9	JLS ‡	JLS	1	21 November 2009	1
21 November 2009	7	Reality Killed the Video Star ‡	Robbie Williams	2	21 November 2009	1
21 November 2009	8	Up to Now ‡	Snow Patrol	3	21 November 2009	1
21 November 2009	4	Only Revolutions	Biffy Clyro	3	11 September 2010	1
28 November 2009	5	The Hits	Will Young	7	9 January 2010	1
5 December 2009	7	I Dreamed a Dream ‡	Susan Boyle	1	5 December 2009	4
12 December 2009	4	The Greatest Day – Take That Present: The Circus Live ‡	Take That	3	12 December 2009	1
Albums in 2010
16 January 2010	32	Sigh No More ♦ (#10)	Mumford & Sons	2	26 February 2011	1
16 January 2010	1	Elvis 75: Good Rockin' Tonight	Elvis Presley	8	16 January 2010	1
23 January 2010	2	Contra	Vampire Weekend	3	23 January 2010	1
23 January 2010	1	Hold Me Down	You Me at Six	5	23 January 2010	1
23 January 2010	7	Forever Vienna	André Rieu & the Johann Strauss Orchestra	2	13 February 2010	2
23 January 2010	23	The Element of Freedom (#7)	Alicia Keys	1	13 February 2010	2
23 January 2010	1	Acolyte	Delphic	8	23 January 2010	1
30 January 2010	1	The Betrayed	Lostprophets	3	30 January 2010	1
30 January 2010	8	My World	Justin Bieber	3	3 April 2010	3
6 February 2010	2	Alvin & the Chipmunks: The Squeakquel – Original Motion Picture Soundtrack	The Chipmunks & The Chipettes	6	6 February 2010	1
13 February 2010	1	The Sea	Corinne Bailey Rae	5	13 February 2010	1
13 February 2010	1	Animal	Kesha	8	13 February 2010	1
13 February 2010	2	Unconditional: Love Songs	Peter Andre	7	20 February 2010	1
20 February 2010	1	Soldier of Love	Sade	4	20 February 2010	1
20 February 2010	1	Heligoland	Massive Attack	6	20 February 2010	1
27 February 2010	7	Glee: The Music, Volume 1	Glee cast	1	27 February 2010	1
27 February 2010	1	Ocean Eyes	Owl City	7	27 February 2010	1
6 March 2010	1	The Family Jewels	Marina and the Diamonds	5	6 March 2010	1
6 March 2010	1	Falcon	The Courteeners	6	6 March 2010	1
6 March 2010	1	American VI: Ain't No Grave	Johnny Cash	9	6 March 2010	1
13 March 2010	8	Lights	Ellie Goulding	1	13 March 2010	1
13 March 2010	3	Jason Derülo	Jason Derulo	8	13 March 2010	1
13 March 2010	1	Rated R	Rihanna	9	13 March 2010	1
20 March 2010	6	Brother	Boyzone	1	20 March 2010	3
20 March 2010	2	Plastic Beach	Gorillaz	2	20 March 2010	1
20 March 2010	2	A Curious Thing	Amy Macdonald	4	20 March 2010	1
20 March 2010	1	Love Never Dies: Original Cast Recording	Various artists	10	20 March 2010	1
27 March 2010	4	Glee: The Music, Volume 2	Glee cast	2	27 March 2010	1
3 April 2010	1	I Speak Because I Can	Laura Marling	4	3 April 2010	1
3 April 2010	1	Head First	Goldfrapp	6	3 April 2010	1
10 April 2010	3	The Very Best of Free & Bad Company	Free & Bad Company	10	10 April 2010	3
24 April 2010	30	The Defamation of Strickland Banks (#5)	Plan B	1	24 April 2010	2
24 April 2010	3	Everybody Wants to Be on TV	Scouting for Girls	2	24 April 2010	1
24 April 2010	1	Congratulations	MGMT	4	24 April 2010	1
24 April 2010	1	Simple Times	Joshua Radin	9	24 April 2010	1
1 May 2010	5	Iron Man 2	AC/DC	1	1 May 2010	1
1 May 2010	2	Wake Up the Nation	Paul Weller	2	1 May 2010	1
1 May 2010	1	Hang Cool Teddy Bear	Meat Loaf	4	1 May 2010	1
1 May 2010	1	My Best Friend Is You	Kate Nash	8	1 May 2010	1
8 May 2010	2	Raymond v. Raymond	Usher	2	8 May 2010	1
8 May 2010	1	Glee: The Music, The Power of Madonna (EP)	Glee cast	4	8 May 2010	1
8 May 2010	1	Fever	Bullet for My Valentine	5	8 May 2010	1
8 May 2010	1	Port Isaac's Fisherman's Friends	Fisherman's Friends	9	8 May 2010	1
15 May 2010	2	Songs from the Tainted Cherry Tree	Diana Vickers	1	15 May 2010	1
15 May 2010	1	Need You Now	Lady Antebellum	8	15 May 2010	1
22 May 2010	2	Night Train (EP)	Keane	1	22 May 2010	1
22 May 2010	1	The Remix	Lady Gaga	3	22 May 2010	1
22 May 2010	1	High Violet	The National	5	22 May 2010	1
22 May 2010	1	Total Life Forever	Foals	8	22 May 2010	1
29 May 2010	2	Exile on Main St.	The Rolling Stones	1	29 May 2010	1
29 May 2010	2	The Dance	Faithless	2	29 May 2010	1
29 May 2010	1	Strike!	The Baseballs	4	29 May 2010	1
29 May 2010	1	This Is Happening	LCD Soundsystem	7	29 May 2010	1
5 June 2010	3	Immersion	Pendulum	1	5 June 2010	1
5 June 2010	3	Glee: The Music, Volume 3 Showstoppers	Glee cast	3	5 June 2010	2
5 June 2010	2	The House	Katie Melua	4	5 June 2010	1
12 June 2010	2	To the Sea	Jack Johnson	1	12 June 2010	1
12 June 2010	1	In the Mood	The RAF Squadronaires	9	5 June 2010	1
19 June 2010	1	Bionic	Christina Aguilera	1	19 June 2010	1
19 June 2010	2	The Very Best of Glenn Miller	Glenn Miller	4	26 June 2010	1
26 June 2010	5	Time Flies... 1994–2009	Oasis	1	26 June 2010	1
26 June 2010	1	Glee: The Music, Journey to Regionals (EP)	Glee cast	2	26 June 2010	1
26 June 2010	1	Piano Man: The Very Best of Billy Joel	Billy Joel	7	26 June 2010	1
3 July 2010	14	Recovery (#9)	Eminem	1	3 July 2010	7
3 July 2010	3	Won't Go Quietly	Example	4	3 July 2010	1
3 July 2010	1	Can't Be Tamed	Miley Cyrus	8	3 July 2010	1
10 July 2010	3	Night Work	Scissor Sisters	2	10 July 2010	1
17 July 2010	4	Aphrodite	Kylie Minogue	1	17 July 2010	1
17 July 2010	1	Euphoria	Enrique Iglesias	6	10 July 2010	1
24 July 2010	12	Eliza Doolittle	Eliza Doolittle	3	24 July 2010	1
24 July 2010	1	Flaws	Bombay Bicycle Club	8	24 July 2010	1
31 July 2010	2	Alive Till I'm Dead	Professor Green	2	31 July 2010	1
31 July 2010	1	The Greatest Hits	Earth, Wind & Fire	9	31 July 2010	1
7 August 2010	3	Praise & Blame	Tom Jones	2	7 August 2010	1
7 August 2010	1	Nightmare	Avenged Sevenfold	5	7 August 2010	1
14 August 2010	5	The Suburbs	Arcade Fire	1	14 August 2010	1
21 August 2010	4	xx	The xx	3	18 September 2010	1
28 August 2010	2	The Final Frontier	Iron Maiden	1	28 August 2010	1
28 August 2010	2	Headlines! (EP)	The Saturdays	3	28 August 2010	1
28 August 2010	1	The Illusion of Safety	The Hoosiers	10	28 August 2010	1
4 September 2010	1	Surfing the Void	Klaxons	10	4 September 2010	1
11 September 2010	12	Teenage Dream	Katy Perry	1	11 September 2010	1
11 September 2010	1	Light Me Up	The Pretty Reckless	6	11 September 2010	1
11 September 2010	1	Asylum	Disturbed	7	11 September 2010	1
18 September 2010	5	Flamingo	Brandon Flowers	1	18 September 2010	1
18 September 2010	1	Happiness	Hurts	4	18 September 2010	1
18 September 2010	1	Audio Secrecy	Stone Sour	6	18 September 2010	1
25 September 2010	6	Science & Faith	The Script	1	25 September 2010	2
25 September 2010	2	A Thousand Suns	Linkin Park	2	25 September 2010	1
25 September 2010	2	Band of Joy	Robert Plant & Band of Joy	3	25 September 2010	1
25 September 2010	5	Going Back	Phil Collins	1	2 October 2010	1
25 September 2010	1	Interpol	Interpol	10	25 September 2010	1
2 October 2010	1	Postcards from a Young Man	Manic Street Preachers	3	2 October 2010	1
2 October 2010	2	Hands All Over	Maroon 5	6	2 October 2010	1
9 October 2010	2	Record Collection	Mark Ronson & The Business Intl.	2	9 October 2010	1
9 October 2010	2	Reach for the Skies	Central Band of the Royal Air Force	4	9 October 2010	1
9 October 2010	1	Tiger Suit	KT Tunstall	5	9 October 2010	1
9 October 2010	1	Clapton	Eric Clapton	7	9 October 2010	1
9 October 2010	1	Simply Red 25: The Greatest Hits	Simply Red	9	9 October 2010	1
16 October 2010	10	Disc-Overy	Tinie Tempah	1	16 October 2010	1
16 October 2010	1	25	A-ha	10	16 October 2010	1
23 October 2010	5	In and Out of Consciousness: Greatest Hits 1990–2010	Robbie Williams	1	23 October 2010	1
23 October 2010	1	Bold as Brass	Cliff Richard	3	23 October 2010	1
23 October 2010	1	Magnetic Man	Magnetic Man	5	23 October 2010	1
23 October 2010	1	Belle and Sebastian Write About Love	Belle and Sebastian	8	23 October 2010	1
23 October 2010	1	AB III	Alter Bridge	9	23 October 2010	1
30 October 2010	9	Come Around Sundown	Kings of Leon	1	30 October 2010	2
30 October 2010	1	1967–1970	The Beatles	4	30 October 2010	1
30 October 2010	1	1962–1966	The Beatles	6	30 October 2010	1
6 November 2010	1	Wide Awake	Joe McElderry	3	6 November 2010	1
6 November 2010	2	The Wanted	The Wanted	4	6 November 2010	1
6 November 2010	1	Speak Now	Taylor Swift	6	6 November 2010	1
6 November 2010	1	The Ultimate Collection	Barbra Streisand	8	6 November 2010	1
6 November 2010	1	Letters Home	The Soldiers	10	6 November 2010	1
13 November 2010	3	Messy Little Raindrops	Cheryl	1	13 November 2010	1
13 November 2010	8	Greatest Hits	Bon Jovi	2	13 November 2010	2
13 November 2010	7	Seasons of My Soul	Rumer	3	13 November 2010	1
13 November 2010	2	Fly Me to the Moon... The Great American Songbook Volume V	Rod Stewart	5	13 November 2010	1
13 November 2010	1	Rock Dust Light Star	Jamiroquai	7	13 November 2010	1
13 November 2010	1	Dreams	Neil Diamond	8	13 November 2010	1
13 November 2010	1	Accelerate	Peter Andre	10	13 November 2010	1
20 November 2010	7	The Gift	Susan Boyle	1	20 November 2010	1
20 November 2010	1	Some Kind of Trouble	James Blunt	4	20 November 2010	1
20 November 2010	13	The Lady Killer ♦	CeeLo Green	3	22 January 2011	1
27 November 2010	17	Progress (#1)	Take That	1	27 November 2010	7
27 November 2010	32	Loud ♦ (#4)	Rihanna	1	8 January 2011	3
27 November 2010	4	Moonlight Serenade	André Rieu & the Johann Strauss Orchestra	4	27 November 2010	1
27 November 2010	2	Greatest Hits... So Far!!!	Pink	5	27 November 2010	1
27 November 2010	1	The Promise	Bruce Springsteen	7	27 November 2010	1
4 December 2010	6	Outta This World	JLS	2	4 December 2010	1
4 December 2010	1	Gravity	Westlife	3	4 December 2010	1
11 December 2010	4	Olly Murs	Olly Murs	2	11 December 2010	1
11 December 2010	1	Love.Live.Life	N-Dubz	7	11 December 2010	1
11 December 2010	1	Endlessly	Duffy	9	11 December 2010	1
18 December 2010	3	The Beginning ♦	The Black Eyed Peas	8	1 January 2011	1
25 December 2010	2	Michael	Michael Jackson	4	25 December 2010	1

== Entries by artist ==
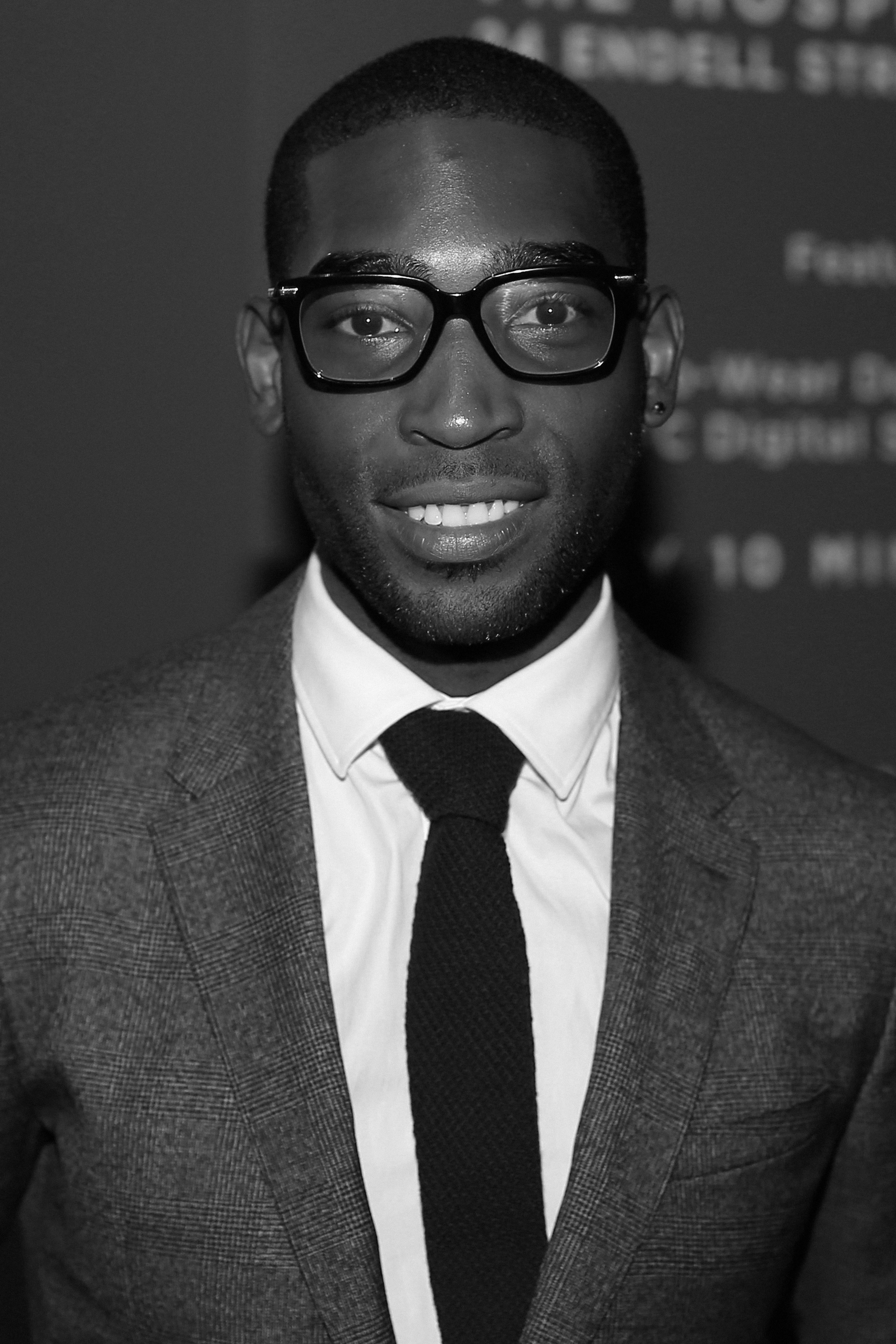
Tinie Tempah's debut album Disc-Overy debuted at number-one in the UK in October of this year.

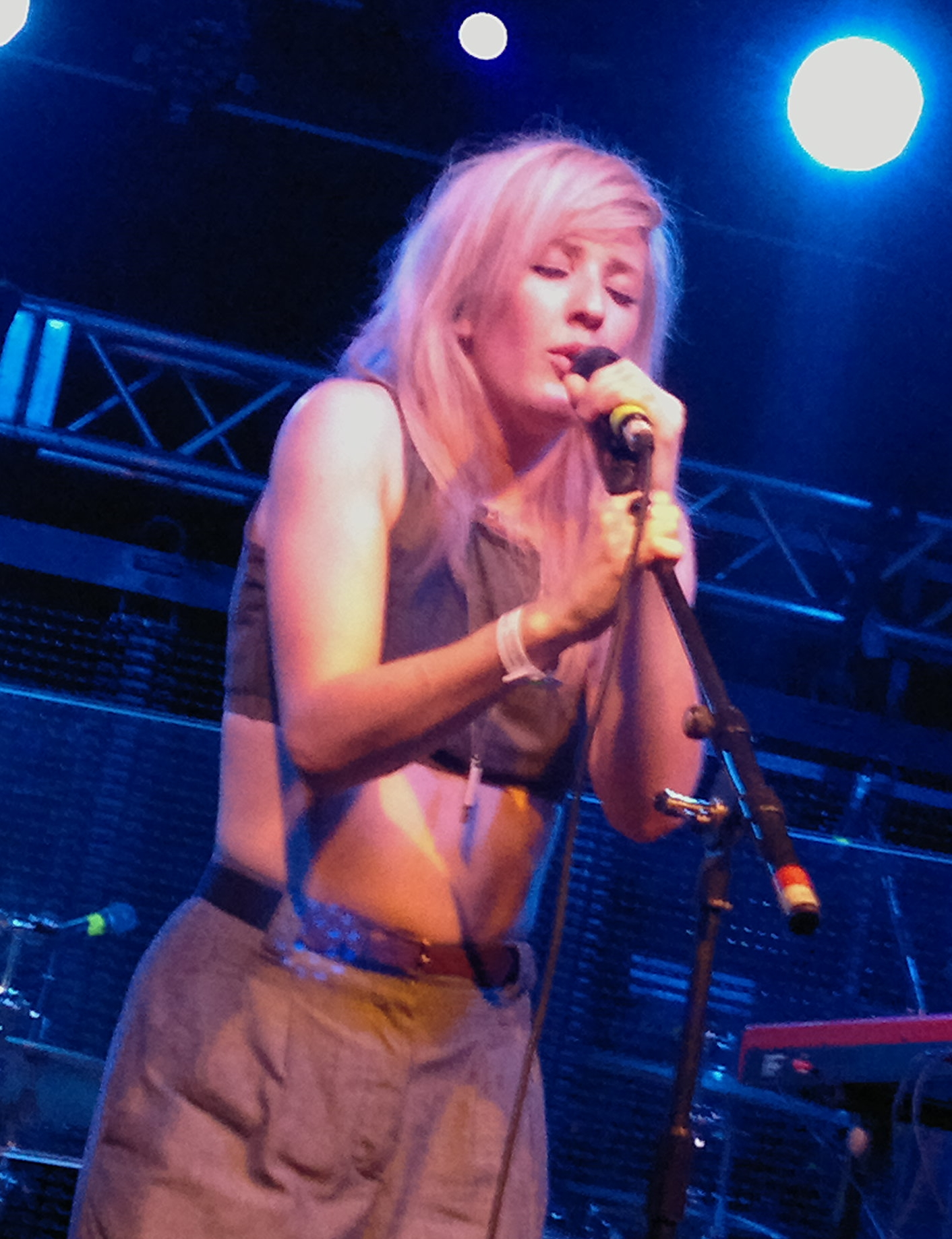
Ellie Goulding reached number-one in March 2010 with her debut album Lights.

The following table shows artists who achieved two or more top 10 entries in 2009, including albums that reached their peak in 2009 or 2011. The figures only include main artists, with featured artists and appearances on compilation albums not counted individually for each artist. The total number of weeks an artist spent in the top ten in 2010 is also shown.

Entries	Artist	Weeks	Albums
5	Glee cast	16	Glee: The Music, Volume 1, Glee: The Music, Volume 2, Glee: The Music, Volume 3 Showstoppers, Glee: The Music, Journey to Regionals (EP), Glee: The Music, The Power of Madonna (EP)
3	Robbie Williams	11	In and Out of Consciousness: Greatest Hits 1990–2010, Progress, Reality Killed the Video Star
2	André Rieu	11	Forever Vienna, Moonlight Serenade
2	The Beatles	2	1962–1966, 1967–1970
2	The Black Eyed Peas	10	The Beginning, The E.N.D.
2	Cheryl	4	3 Words, Messy Little Raindrops
2	JLS	7	JLS, Outta This World
2	Johann Strauss Orchestra	11	Forever Vienna, Moonlight Serenade
2	Lady Gaga	40	The Fame, The Remix
2	Peter Andre	3	Accelerate, Unconditional: Love Songs
2	Rihanna	6	Loud, Rated R
2	Susan Boyle	9	I Dreamed a Dream, The Gift
2	Take That	6	Progress, The Greatest Day – Take That Present: The Circus Live

== Notes ==
- Sigh No More reached its peak of number two on 26 February 2011 (week ending).
- Sunny Side Up re-entered the top 10 at number-one on 9 January 2010 (week ending) for 19 weeks and at number 8 on 14 August 2010 (week ending) for 3 weeks.
- The E.N.D. re-entered the top 10 at number 10 on 20 February 2010 (week ending) for 2 weeks, at number 10 on 15 May 2010 (week ending) for 2 weeks and at number 3 on 3 July 2010 (week ending) for 2 weeks.
- Lungs re-entered the top 10 at number 6 on 9 January 2010 (week ending) for 17 weeks, at number 6 on 15 May 2010 (week ending) for 5 weeks and at number 10 on 31 July 2010 (week ending).
- One Love re-entered the top 10 at number 10 on 10 July 2010 (week ending).
- The Resistance re-entered the top 10 at number 8 on 9 January 2010 (week ending).
- The Blueprint 3 re-entered the top 10 at number 10 on 27 February 2010 (week ending).
- Turn It Up re-entered the top 10 at number 10 on 23 January 2010 (week ending) for 3 weeks, at number 10 on 19 June 2010 (week ending) and at number 9 on 30 October 2010 (week ending).
- Crazy Love re-entered the top 10 at number 8 on 20 February 2010 (week ending), at number 6 on 20 March 2010 (week ending), at number 2 on 5 June 2010 (week ending) for 5 weeks, at number 10 on 7 August 2010 (week ending) for 5 weeks, at number 7 on 30 October 2010 (week ending) for 11 weeks and at number 7 on 16 April 2011 (week ending).
- JLS re-entered the top 10 at number 8 on 6 March 2010 (week ending).
- Reality Killed the Video Star re-entered the top 10 at number 8 on 27 February 2010 (week ending).
- Only Revolutions re-entered the top 10 at number 9 on 6 February 2010 (week ending) and at number 3 on 11 September 2010 (week ending) for 2 weeks.
- 3 Words re-entered the top 10 at number 10 on 2 January 2010 (week ending).
- Sigh No More re-entered the top 10 at number 10 on 6 March 2010 (week ending) for 2 weeks, at number 9 on 27 March 2010 (week ending) for 4 weeks, at number 10 on 26 June 2010 (week ending) for 8 weeks, at number 7 on 4 September 2010 (week ending) for 3 weeks, at number 9 on 2 October 2010 (week ending) for 4 weeks, at number 6 on 2 January 2011 (week ending) for 3 weeks and at number 2 on 26 February 2011 (week ending) for 3 weeks.
- Forever Vienna re-entered the top 10 at number 10 on 13 March 2010 (week ending).
- The Element of Freedom re-entered the top 10 at number 8 on 29 May 2010 (week ending) for 10 weeks.
- My World re-entered the top 10 at number 3 on 3 April 2010 (week ending) for 5 weeks following the release of the album My World 2.0. (known in the UK as My Worlds). It re-entered the top 10 for a second time at number 7 on 15 May 2010 (week ending).
- Lights re-entered the top 10 at number 9 on 8 January 2011 (week ending) for 6 weeks and at number 10 on 14 May 2011 (week ending).
- Jason Derulo re-entered the top 10 at number 10 on 14 August 2010 (week ending) for 2 weeks.
- Glee: The Music, Volume 1 re-entered the top 10 at number 7 on 10 April 2010 (week ending) for 2 weeks.
- The Defamation of Strickland Banks re-entered the top 10 at number 9 on 26 June 2010 (week ending) for 12 weeks, at number 6 on 16 October 2010 (week ending) for 3 weeks, at number 3 on 8 January 2011 (week ending) for 5 weeks and at number 7 on 26 February 2011 (week ending) for 2 weeks.
- Piano Man: The Very Best of Billy Joel originally peaked outside the top 10 at number 40 upon its initial release in 2004. It entered the top 20 on 22 July 2006 (week ending) for 9 weeks, peaking at number 11. It reached top 10 for the first time on 26 July 2008 (week ending) and peaked at number 9.
- Recovery re-entered the top 10 at number 9 on 16 October 2010 (week ending).
- Eliza Doolittle re-entered the top 10 at number 9 on 22 January 2011 (week ending) for 3 weeks.
- XX re-entered the top 10 at number 3 on 18 September 2010 (week ending) for 3 weeks.
- Teenage Dream re-entered the top 10 at number 5 on 30 October 2010 (week ending) for 2 weeks, at number 9 on 20 November 2010 (week ending) for 2 weeks, at number 8 on 8 January 2011 (week ending) for 2 weeks, at number 8 on 29 October 2011 (week ending) and at number 6 on 7 April 2012 (week ending).
- Hands All Over re-entered the top 10 at number 10 on 29 October 2011 (week ending).
- Simply Red 25: The Greatest Hits peaked at number 9 upon its initial release in 2008.
- Disc-Overy re-entered the top 10 at number 4 on 8 January 2011 (week ending) for 4 weeks and at number 6 on 26 February 2011 (week ending) for 2 weeks.
- In and Out of Consciousness: Greatest Hits 1990–2010 re-entered the top 10 at number 7 on 25 December 2010 (week ending).
- Come Around Sundown re-entered the top 10 at number 8 on 4 December 2010 (week ending) and at number 7 on 18 December 2010 (week ending) for 3 weeks.
- 1967-1970 (also known as The Blue Album) peaked at number 2 upon its initial release in 1973.
- 1962-1966 (also known as The Red Album) peaked at number 3 upon its initial release in 1973.
- The Wanted re-entered the top 10 at number 5 on 8 January 2011 (week ending).
- Seasons of My Soul re-entered the top 10 at number 6 on 15 January 2011 (week ending) for 3 weeks and at number 9 on 12 February 2011 (week ending) for 2 weeks.
- The Lady Killer re-entered the top 10 at number 4 on 15 January 2011 (week ending) for 5 weeks, at number 9 on 5 March 2011 (week ending) for 2 weeks, at number 8 on 23 April 2011 (week ending) for 3 weeks, at number 9 on 16 July 2011 (week ending) and at number 8 on 22 October 2011 (week ending).
- Progress re-entered the top 10 at number 10 on 19 February 2011 (week ending) for 2 weeks, at number 9 on 11 June 2011 (week ending) and at number 3 on 25 June 2011 (week ending) for 5 weeks.
- Loud re-entered the top 10 at number 9 on 2 July 2011 (week ending), at number 8 on 16 July 2011 (week ending) for 3 weeks, at number 10 on 13 August 2011 (week ending) and at number 10 on 3 September 2011 (week ending).
- Outta This World re-entered the top 10 at number 10 on 5 March 2011 (week ending).
- Figure includes album that peaked in 2009.
- Figure includes album that first charted in 2009 but peaked in 2010.
- Figure includes album that peaked in 2011.

== See also ==
- 2010 in British music
- List of number-one albums from the 2000s (UK)
