= List of number-one albums of 2011 (Ireland) =

The Irish Albums Chart is a record chart compiled by Chart-Track on behalf of the Irish Recorded Music Association. The chart week runs from Friday to Thursday.

Issue date	Album	Artist	Reference
6 January	Loud	Rihanna	
13 January	Loud	Rihanna	
20 January	Doo-Wops & Hooligans	Bruno Mars	
27 January	21	Adele	
3 February	21	Adele	
10 February	21	Adele	
17 February	21	Adele	
24 February	21	Adele	
3 March	21	Adele	
10 March	21	Adele	
17 March	21	Adele	
24 March	21	Adele	
31 March	Mine & Yours	Mary Byrne	
7 April	Mine & Yours	Mary Byrne	
14 April	21	Adele	
21 April	21	Adele	
28 April	21	Adele	
5 May	21	Adele	
12 May	21	Adele	
19 May	21	Adele	
26 May	Born This Way	Lady Gaga	
2 June	Born This Way	Lady Gaga	
9 June	21	Adele	
16 June	21	Adele	
23 June	21	Adele	
30 June	4	Beyoncé	
7 July	21	Adele	
14 July	21	Adele	
21 July	21	Adele	
28 July	21	Adele	
4 August	21	Adele	
11 August	Victory	Jedward	
18 August	Victory	Jedward	
25 August	21	Adele	
1 September	I'm with You	Red Hot Chili Peppers	
8 September	21	Adele	
15 September	21	Adele	
22 September	21	Adele	
29 September	21	Adele	
6 October	21	Adele	
13 October	Passenger	Lisa Hannigan	
20 October	Noel Gallagher's High Flying Birds	Noel Gallagher's High Flying Birds	
27 October	Mylo Xyloto	Coldplay	
3 November	Ceremonials	Florence and the Machine	
10 November	Ceremonials	Florence and the Machine	
17 November	Fallen Empires	Snow Patrol	
24 November	Greatest Hits	Westlife	
1 December	Christmas	Michael Bublé	
8 December	Christmas	Michael Bublé	
15 December	Christmas	Michael Bublé	
22 December	Christmas	Michael Bublé	
29 December	Christmas	Michael Bublé	

== See also ==
- List of number-one singles of 2011 (Ireland)
