= I Just Call You Mine =

2009 single by Martina McBride

Single by Martina McBride

from the album Shine
- Released: May 18, 2009
- Genre: Country
- Length: 4:20
- Label: RCA Nashville
- Songwriters: Jess Cates; Ty Lacy; Dennis Matkosky
- Producers: Dann Huff; Martina McBride

Martina McBride singles chronology
"Ride" (2008)	"I Just Call You Mine" (2009)	"Wrong Baby Wrong" (2010)

Music video
- "I Just Call You Mine" at CMT.com

"I Just Call You Mine" is a song written by Jess Cates, Ty Lacy and Dennis Matkosky, and recorded by David Phelps for his 2008 album The Voice. However, it was covered notably by American country music artist Martina McBride. It was released in May 2009 as the second single from her album, Shine. The song was also recorded by Mary Byrne in 2011 for her debut album where it reached number 12.

McBride performed the song on July 15, 2009 on NBC's Today when the couple got married during the show's 10th annual "Today Throws a Wedding" promotion. She also performed the song live on ABC's The Bachelorette on May 25, 2009.

== Content ==
"I Just Call You Mine" is a mid-tempo love song, backed by percussion and electric guitar. The narrator speaks of how blessed she is to have snagged a lover who everyone thinks is amazing, but at the end of the day "I just call him mine."

The song is written in the Key of G Major. Mrs. McBride hits the low note of G3 and the highest note of D4, which is toward the low end of her soprano voice. The song follows the simplified chord progression of Gsus2, Csus2, Gsus2, Csus2, G, C, Gsus2, Csus2, Em, B, G, A on the Verses and A, G, D, Em, C, G, B7/D#, Em D, C, G, D, Gsus2 on the Chorus sections, following a Moderately Slow tempo throughout.

McBride commented on the song to CMT Insider when she was on set filming the song's music video. "I just heard it, and immediately I thought, 'What a beautiful love song.' I mean, doesn't everybody wish that somebody was going to sing this about them? And the song is a little bit different for me. It's a little bit vulnerable ... basically saying, 'I can't believe I have you, and everybody else thinks you're amazing, but you're all mine.' I love the fact that it's a little bit different. It's something that songs have said forever -- 'I love you' -- but it's said in a little bit different way, and I thought that was really cool."

== Critical reception ==
Tara Seetharam of Country Universe gave the song a B rating. "It’s pleasant and effective, and McBride’s soaring vocals are flawless, even tastefully soaring a little less than usual. But as her signature power ballads go, this one falls just a tad short of stirring emotion. [...]But that brings it full circle – few country artists are “limitless” as McBride has proven to be time and time in the past, and in turn, I expect more from her than a mediocre song like this one."

== Music video ==
A music video, which was filmed in downtown Nashville and directed by Theresa Wingert, premiered on CMT on June 15, 2009.

In the video, McBride is shown standing in the dark with a single light behind her. As the video progresses, she is shown standing with many colored and white lights strung on wires in the background and in front of her, with tall buildings beyond them. Mixed with these are black-and-white scenes of different couples; a young couple are shown running on the beach, an elderly couple sitting on a bench together, and one woman is shown embracing her husband returning from war (among others). Some of the footage of the couples showcases different time periods, often appearing grainy and with the couples dressed to mirror fashion from the earlier 20th century, in addition to couples of today's time.

The video debuted at number 20 on CMT's Top Twenty Countdown for the week of June 26, 2009.

== Chart performance ==
"I Just Call You Mine" debuted at number 59 on the U.S. Billboard Hot Country Songs charts several weeks prior to its release as a single, before falling off. After its official release, it returned to the charts at number 55. It entered the Top 40 after eight weeks on the chart. In August 2009, it made its debut on the U.S. Billboard Hot 100 at number 97. In November 2009, it reached a peak of number 18 on the U.S. Billboard Hot Country Songs chart becoming a minor Top 20

Chart (2009)	Peak position
Canada Country (Billboard)	31
US Hot Country Songs (Billboard)	18
US Billboard Hot 100	97

== Mary Byrne version ==
"I Just Call You Mine"

Single by Mary Byrne

from the album Mine & Yours
- Released: March 4, 2011
- Genre: Pop rock
- Length: 4:30
- Label: Sony Music Ireland
- Songwriters: Jess Cates; Ty Lacy; Dennis Matkosky
- Producer: Nigel Wright

"I Just Call You Mine" was covered by X Factor finalist Mary Byrne as the lead single from her debut album Mine & Yours . The single was released on March 4, 2011 in Ireland and March 6, 2011 in the United Kingdom.

=== Background ===
Sony Music Ireland revealed that the single's release was brought forward due to phenomenal demand. Mary Byrne unveiled the track from her album, ‘Mine & Yours’ on Irish radio, where the fan reaction was so positive that Sony Music Ireland were 'inundated' with requests to make the song available to the public before the album release.

=== Chart positions ===
Chart (2011)	Peak position
Ireland (IRMA)	12
UK Chart	16
