= Nollaig No. 1 =

Irish language talent show in 2008

- Starring: Róisín Ní Thomáin
- Country of origin: Ireland
- Original language: Irish

Production
- Camera setup: Multi-Camera
- Running time: 60 minutes

Original release
- Network: TG4

Nollaig No. 1 (Christmas Number 1) is an Irish-language talent show, the winner of which got the opportunity to release their winning song to the general public for Christmas 2008.

It was won by Mary Lee who released the single Siúil Leat, a festive and Irish take on You'll Never Walk Alone In 2010 Lee took part in The X Factor (British TV series) using the name Mary Byrne.
