= Ride (Martina McBride song) =

Single by Martina McBride

from the album Shine
- Released: November 17, 2008
- Length: 3:56
- Label: RCA Nashville
- Songwriters: Michael Davey; Andrew Dorff; Chris Robbins
- Producers: Dann Huff; Martina McBride

Martina McBride singles chronology
"For These Times" (2007)	"Ride" (2008)	"I Just Call You Mine" (2009)

Music video
- "Ride" on YouTube

"Ride" is a song recorded by American country music artist Martina McBride. The song was written by Michael Davey, Andrew Dorff and Chris Robbins, and produced by McBride and Dann Huff. The song was released as the lead single to her tenth studio album Shine (2009) on November 17, 2008 to country radio by RCA Nashville Records. The song peaked at number 11 on the US Hot Country Songs and number 82 on the Billboard Hot 100. It was criticized for its message but McBride's performance was praised.

== Critical reception ==
The song received a "thumbs down" from Engine 145 reviewer Juli Thanki, who commented that "though catchy, [the song] is a little low on cogency–not to mention originality." She also criticized it for being a "message song" in the line of McBride's other 2000s releases. She did, however, make note of McBride's vocal performance, saying that it showed emotion and was not reliant on "overly dramatic belting". Kevin Coyne of Country Universe, however, gave the song an A− rating. His review also describes McBride's vocal performance favorably: "McBride gives the song a straightforward performance that’s rough around the edges in all of the right ways."

"Ride" was nominated for Female Video of the Year in the 2009 CMT Music Awards.

== Music video ==
The music video for "Ride" was directed by Kristin Barlowe, and was released on February 2, 2009. In the video, people are seen looking up at McBride's video on a rooftop billboard. On the billboard, McBride sang in front of a green screen as high-speed images of weather elements and traffic cycle behind her. This excites the pedestrians, and they begin dancing, jumping on cars, and enjoying themselves.

The video was ranked number 41 on GAC's Top 50 Videos of the Year.

== Chart performance ==
"Ride" debuted on the Hot Country Songs chart at number 43 in November 2008. The song peaked at number 11 in April 2009.

Chart (2008–2009)	Peak position
Canada Country (Billboard)	22
US Hot Country Songs (Billboard)	11
US Billboard Hot 100	82

=== Year-end charts ===
Chart (2009)	Position
US Country Songs (Billboard)	56
