= ...with Love =

Studio album by Mary Byrne
- Released: 25 November 2011
- Recorded: 2011
- Genre: Pop, rock
- Label: Universal Music Ireland ( (Republic of Ireland) ) Decca ( (United Kingdom) )
- Producer: Phil Coulter

Mary Byrne chronology
Mine & Yours (2011)	...with Love (2011)

...with Love is the second studio album from Irish singer Mary Byrne. The album was released on 25 November 2011 in Ireland, and 5 March 2012 in the UK. The album was produced by Phil Coulter. The album peaked to number 10 on the Irish Albums Chart.

== Background ==
On 13 September 2011, it was announced that Mary Byrne had asked to end her record deal with Sony, and asked to switch to Universal. It was later announced that she had started working on a second album, produced by Phil Coulter, to be released in Ireland by Universal Music Ireland, and in the UK by Decca UK. On 2 November, Mary Byrne stated on her Facebook page that her new album was to be released in Ireland on 25 November. Her management team later announced that the album would be released the following year in March for the UK.

== Promotion ==
She appeared on The Late Late Show the day of Ireland release, and talked to Ryan Tubridy after performing a song on the album called 'Thank God That This Was My Life' written for her by Phil Coulter. Mary is due to have a concert featuring her latest songs from the album with Phil Coulter in the Olympia Theatre on 8 May 2012. The public demand on ticket sales was so overwhelming, 5 extra nights were added, evidently resulting in a total of a 6 night residency that ended on 13 May.

== Track listing ==
Source: iTunes

No.	Title	Writer(s)	Length
1.	"Never, Never, Never (I Hate You Then I Love You)"	Alberto Testa, Tony Renis	3:41
2.	"Valentine"	Jim Brickman	3:18
3.	"The Air That I Breathe"	Albert Hammond, Mike Hazlewood	3:56
4.	"I Don't Know How to Love Him"	Andrew Lloyd Webber, Tim Rice	3:59
5.	"You Don't Know Me"	Cindy Walker, Eddy Arnold	3:02
6.	"For The Good Times"	Kris Kristofferson	3:51
7.	"Who's Sorry Now?"	Ted Snyder, Bert Kalmar, Harry Ruby	3:54
8.	"If You Go Away"	Jacques Brel, Rod McKuen	4:25
9.	"Scorn Not His Simplicity"	Phil Coulter	4:09
10.	"You Needed Me"	Randy Goodrum	3:18
11.	"As Long as He Needs Me"	Lionel Bart	2:38
12.	"Thank God That This Was My Life"	Phil Coulter	4:08

== Chart performance ==
Chart (2011)	Peak position
Irish Albums Chart	10
UK Albums Chart	28
