= Wrong Baby Wrong Baby Wrong =

"Wrong Baby Wrong"

Single by Martina McBride

from the album Shine
- Released: February 1, 2010
- Recorded: 2008
- Studio: Blackbird (Nashville, Tennessee)
- Genre: Country
- Length: 3:39
- Label: RCA Nashville
- Songwriters: Stephen Barker Liles; Robert Ellis Orrall; Brad Warren; Brett Warren
- Producers: Martina McBride; Dann Huff

Martina McBride singles chronology
"I Just Call You Mine" (2009)	"Wrong Baby Wrong" (2010)	"Teenage Daughters" (2011)

Music video
- "Wrong Baby Wrong Baby Wrong" at CMT.com

"Wrong Baby Wrong Baby Wrong" (re-titled as "Wrong Baby Wrong" for its single release) is a song by American country music recording artist Martina McBride, recorded for her tenth studio album Shine (2009) and is the opening track to the album. The track was written by The Warren Brothers, a duo made up of brothers Brad and Brett Warren, Robert Ellis Orrall, and Stephen Barker Liles of the duo Love and Theft. Sent for country radio on February 1, 2010, the song not only was her first single release of the 2010s, but was also her final single released under RCA Nashville Records, the label she had been signed with since 1991.

The single would reach number 11 on the US Hot Country Songs chart, becoming her 29th top-20 hit but also making Shine McBride's third album to not have a song crack the top ten at country radio following The Time Has Come (1992) and Timeless (2005).

== Content ==
"Wrong Baby Wrong Baby Wrong" is a moderate up-tempo, backed primarily by electric guitar, that features a hook where the beginning of each lyrical phrase in the verses are repeated to match the song's title. In the song, a female narrator describes telling another woman to pick herself back up after her man has walked out on her, describing that everyone experiences these moments as part of life.

== Critical reception ==
Engine 145 reviewer Blake Boldt gave the song a thumbs-up, stating that while the song "stumbles in telling its story," it "offers the listener a blast of sass that’s sorely missing from country radio." He also favorably described the song's production as having a "bluesier edge," with a "groovy energy [that] breathes life into a slight little ditty."

== Commercial performance ==
"Wrong Baby Wrong" debuted at number 51 on the US Billboard Hot Country Songs chart the week of February 6, 2010. It would peak at number eleven on June 19, 2010, spending 23 weeks in total; on Mediabase's Country Aircheck chart, the track would reach number ten. The song would peak at number 74 on the Billboard Hot 100 and number 54 on the Radio Songs chart.

== Music video ==
The music video, which was directed by Theresa Wingert, premiered on CMT on March 18, 2010.

=== Synopsis ===
In the video, McBride is shown driving her car to pick up her friends, who appear to be upset after their boyfriends' walked out on them, to take them out for a good time. The first woman she picks up is drinking coffee alone in a diner, the second is at a laundromat doing her laundry, and the third woman is shown staring out her apartment window. After picking up her friends, McBride takes them to a bar so that the women can enjoy themselves, while she performs the song on stage.

== Personnel ==
Taken from the Shine liner notes.

- Dann Huff – electric guitar
- Eric Darken – percussion
- Tim Akers – organ
- Tom Bukovac – electric guitar
- Jimmie Lee Sloas – bass
- Harry Stinson – background vocals
- Matt Chamberlain – drums
- Charles Judge – synthesizer
- Ilya Toshinskiy – acoustic guitar

== Charts ==
=== Weekly charts ===
Chart (2010)	Peak position
Canada Country (Billboard)	18
US Billboard Hot 100	74
US Hot Country Songs (Billboard)	11
US Country Aircheck (Mediabase)	10

=== Year-end charts ===
Chart (2010)	Position
US Country Songs (Billboard)	52
