= Shine (Martina McBride album) =

Studio album by Martina McBride
- Released: March 24, 2009
- Recorded: 2008
- Studios: Blackbird (Nashville, Tennessee)
- Genre: Country
- Length: 40:05
- Label: RCA Nashville
- Producers: Dann Huff; Martina McBride

Martina McBride chronology
Playlist: The Very Best of Martina McBride (2008)	Shine (2009)	Eleven (2011)

Singles from Shine
- 1. "Ride" Released: November 17, 2008; 2. "I Just Call You Mine" Released: May 18, 2009; 3. "Wrong Baby Wrong Baby Wrong" Released: February 1, 2010

Professional ratings
Aggregate scores
Source	Rating
Metacritic	67/100
Review scores
Source	Rating
About.com	5/5 stars
Allmusic	3.5/5 stars
BBC Music	Average
The Boston Globe	Favorable
Country Weekly	4/5 stars
Entertainment Weekly	B−
Los Angeles Times	2.5/4 stars
Paste	3.6/10
Robert Christgau	(dud)
Slant Magazine	2.5/5 stars
Uncut	3/5 stars
USA Today	3/4 stars

Shine is the tenth studio album from American country music singer Martina McBride, released on March 24, 2009, by RCA Nashville. The album spun three Top 20 hits on the Billboard country chart: "Ride" and "Wrong Baby Wrong" both reached #11, and "I Just Call You Mine" peaked at #18. McBride co-produced the album with Dann Huff and co-wrote the track "Sunny Side Up." It is her last studio album released through RCA Records before switching to Republic Nashville.

In November 2009, McBride began the Shine All Night Tour in support of the album.

== Content ==
Shine was produced by McBride along with Dann Huff, and it is the first album of her career that Huff has co-produced. Dann was approached by McBride and her husband John to co-produce the record on Huff's birthday. "Ride", the album's debut single, was released in November 2008 and peaked at #11 in April 2009. The follow-up single, "I Just Call You Mine", was sent to radio on May 18, 2009, and is being used in promos for NBC's "Today Wedding Show". It has also charted in the Top 20 of the Billboard Hot Country Songs chart. Shine marked McBride's fourth #1 album on the US Country Albums Charts, being one of the only women in country music to release three #1 albums consecutively. Also on the album, McBride released three top 20 singles, which marked her 24th, 25th and 26th top-20 singles on the US Top Country Singles chart.

Despite debuting at #10, the album spent just seven weeks on the Billboard 200. As of March 2010 the album has sold over 175,000 copies in the US.

"I'm Trying", co-written by Tia Sillers and Darrell Scott, was originally recorded by Kevin Sharp on his 1998 album Love Is, and later by Diamond Rio (as a collaboration with Chely Wright) on their 2001 album One More Day.

As with her last studio album, 2007's Waking Up Laughing, McBride has a co-writer's credit: the track "Sunny Side Up", which she co-wrote with Brad and Brett Warren, also known as The Warren Brothers. The Warren Brothers also co-wrote the lead-off track "Wrong Baby Wrong Baby Wrong" with Robert Ellis Orrall and Stephen Barker Liles, the latter of whom is a member of the band Love and Theft. Although McBride was not involved with the writing of "Wrong Baby Wrong", she helped with the idea, being that the song was originally written in a man's point of view talking to his girlfriend.

On the iTunes Store, a pre-order bonus track was available up to the day of the album's release. It was a cover of Leo Sayer's 1978 hit "I Can't Stop Loving You". This is a different song to the one recorded for Timeless.

== Track listing ==
No.	Title	Writer(s)	Length
1.	"Wrong Baby Wrong Baby Wrong"	Stephen Barker Liles, Robert Ellis Orrall, Brad Warren, Brett Warren	3:39
2.	"I Just Call You Mine"	Jess Cates, Ty Lacy, Dennis Matkosky	4:20
3.	"Sunny Side Up"	Martina McBride, Brad Warren, Brett Warren	2:59
4.	"Walk Away"	Nathan Chapman, Liz Rose, Jesse Walker	3:44
5.	"I'm Trying"	David Campbell, Tia Sillers, Darrell Scott	4:00
6.	"What Do I Have to Do"	Campbell, Michael Dulaney, Tom Shapiro, Neil Thrasher	3:40
7.	"Don't Cost a Dime"	Mark Irwin, Chris Tompkins, Josh Kear	3:12
8.	"Ride"	Michael Davey, Andrew Dorff, Chris Robbins	3:57
9.	"You're Not Leaving Me"	Hillary Lindsey, Gordie Sampson, Troy Verges	3:41
10.	"Wild Rebel Rose"	Irwin, Kear	3:49
11.	"Lies"	Campbell, Catt Gravitt, Tania Hancheroff, Gerald O'Brien	4:02
12.	"I Can't Stop Loving You" (iTunes pre-order bonus track)	Don Gibson	4:28
Total length:			40:05

== Personnel ==
- Martina McBride – lead vocals, backing vocals
- Tim Akers – keyboards, Wurlitzer electric piano, Hammond B3 organ
- Charlie Judge – keyboards, acoustic piano, synthesizers, Hammond B3 organ, strings, programming, lap steel guitar, percussion
- Steve Nathan – keyboards, acoustic piano, clavinet, Hammond B3 organ
- Gordon Mote – acoustic piano
- Tom Bukovac – electric guitar
- Dann Huff – acoustic guitar, electric guitar, mandolin
- Brent Mason – electric guitar
- Adam Shoenfeld – acoustic guitar, electric guitar
- Ilya Toshinsky – acoustic guitar, banjo, bouzouki, mandolin
- Jonathan Yudkin – mandolin
- Dan Dugmore – steel guitar
- Paul Franklin – steel guitar
- Jimmie Lee Sloas – bass
- Glenn Worf – bass
- Matt Chamberlain – drums
- Shannon Forrest – drums
- Chris McHugh – drums
- Eric Darken – percussion
- Stuart Duncan – fiddle
- Sarah Buxton – backing vocals
- Lisa Cochran – backing vocals
- Jerry Flowers – backing vocals
- Carolyn Dawn Johnson – backing vocals
- Harry Stinson – backing vocals
- Russell Terrell – backing vocals
- Jenifer Wrinkle – backing vocals

The Nashville String Machine (Tracks 5, 6 & 11)

- David Campbell – string arrangements and conductor
- Carl Gorodetzky – string contractor
- Pamela Sixfin – concertmaster
- Kirsten Cassel and Carole Rabinowitz – cello
- Jim Grosjean and Kristin Wilkinson – viola
- David Angell, David Davidson, Conni Ellisor, Carl Gorodetzky, Pamela Sixfin, Alan Umstead, Cathy Umstead, Mary Kathryn Vanosdale and Karen Winklemann – violin

== Production ==
- Dann Huff – producer
- Martina McBride – producer
- Darrell Franklin – A&R
- Scott McBride – recording, mixing (5, 7, 10, 11)
- Steve Bishir – additional recording
- Allen Ditto – additional recording, recording assistant, mix assistant (5, 7, 10, 11)
- Mark Hagen – additional recording
- Seth Morton – recording assistant
- Justin Niebank – mixing (1–4, 6, 8, 9)
- Drew Bollman – mix assistant (1–4, 6, 8, 9)
- John Netti – mix assistant (1–4, 6, 8, 9)
- Christopher Rowe – digital editing
- Adam Ayan – mastering at Gateway Mastering (Portland, Maine)
- Mike "Frog" Griffith – production coordinator
- Judy Forde-Blair – creative production, liner notes
- Scott McDaniel – art direction
- Tracy Baskette-Fleaner – design
- Tammie Creek – imaging production
- Kristin Barlowe – photography
- Claudia Fowler – wardrobe stylist
- Earl Cox – hair stylist
- Mary Beth Felts – make-up
- Bruce Allen – management

== Charts ==
=== Weekly charts ===
Chart (2009)	Peak position
US Billboard 200	10
US Top Country Albums (Billboard)	1

=== Year-end charts ===
Chart (2009)	Position
US Top Country Albums (Billboard)	44

=== Singles ===
Year	Single	Chart positions	
Year	Single	US Country	US
2008	"Ride"	11	82
2009	"I Just Call You Mine"	18	97
2010	"Wrong Baby Wrong"	11	74
