= Port Isaac's Fisherman's Friends =

Studio album by Fisherman's Friends
- Released: April 26, 2010
- Genre: Folk, Cornish music, Sea Shanties
- Label: Universal Records

Fisherman's Friends chronology
Another Mouthful From ... The Fisherman's Friends (2009)	Port Isaac's Fisherman's Friends (2010)	One and All (2013)

Port Isaac's Fisherman's Friends is the fourth album from the Cornwall-based folk music group Fisherman's Friends. It was released in the UK on 26 April 2010, on Universal Records. It peaked at number 9 on the UK Albums Chart. It was the group's first release on a major label, as their first three CDs were self-released.

The band is from Port Isaac, a port town on the Celtic Sea, which greatly influences their music. They originally performed to tourists. The album contains many popular Cornish sea shanties and folk songs.

== Track listing ==
CD Single

No.	Title	Length
1.	"South Australia"	2:11
2.	"Sailor Ain't A Sailor"	2:58
3.	"Bully In The Alley"	1:54
4.	"No Hopers, Jokers & Rogues"	3:04
5.	"Brightly Beams / Pull For The Shore"	3:29
6.	"Johnny Gone Down To Hilo"	1:40
7.	"Ladies Of Plymouth"	2:50
8.	"The Union Of Different Kinds"	3:02
9.	"Shenandoah"	3:00
10.	"One More Day"	2:21
11.	"Pay Me My Money Down"	1:45
12.	"Cadgwith Anthem"	2:34
13.	"The Corncrake"	2:06
14.	"The Mingulay Boat Song"	3:03
15.	"Haul Away Joe"	2:14

== Chart performance ==
The album entered the UK Albums Chart on 2 May 2010, at number 9, making it their first Top 10 album.

=== Weekly charts ===
Chart (2010)	Peak position
Scottish Albums (OCC)	20
UK Albums (OCC)	9

=== Year-end charts ===
Chart (2010)	Position
UK Albums (OCC)	137
