= Fisherman's Friends =

Folk music group from Cornwall, England

The Fisherman's Friends
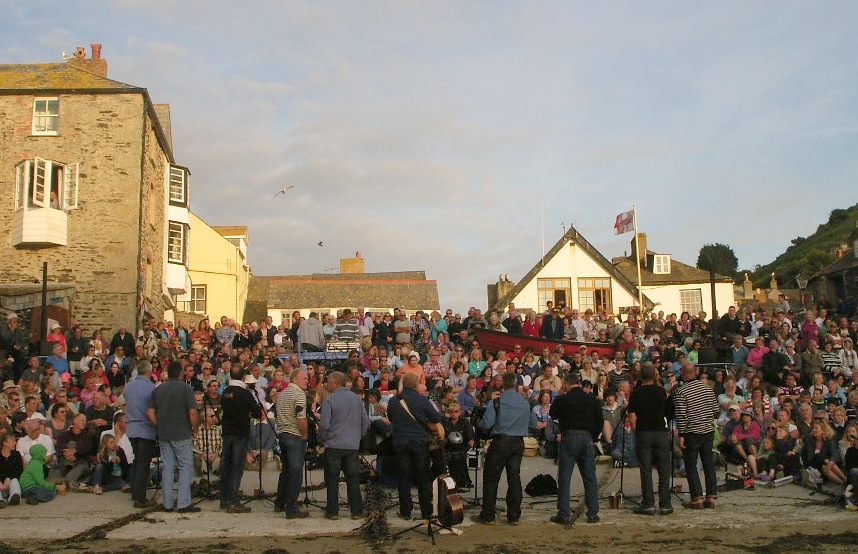
- The Fisherman's Friends performing at Port Isaac

Background information
- Origin: Port Isaac, Cornwall, England
- Genres: Sea shanties; folk
- Years active: 1995–present
- Label: Universal Music Group
- Members: Jeremy Brown; John Lethbridge; Jason Nicholas; John McDonnell; Jon Cleave; Toby Lobb; Bill Hawkins; Simon Biddick
- Past members: Trevor Grills; Nigel Sharratt; Peter Rowe; Julian Brown; John Brown; Jackie Bennett
- Website: thefishermansfriends.com

The Fisherman's Friends are a folk music group from Port Isaac, Cornwall, who sing sea shanties. They have been performing locally since 1995, and signed a record deal with Universal Music Group in March 2010. Whilst essentially an a cappella group, their studio recordings and live performances now often include traditional simple instrumentation.

== History ==
The Fisherman's Friends performances combine traditional songs of the sea with contemporary folk music and a large dash of humour.

The current members are Jeremy Brown, John Lethbridge (Lefty), Jason Nicholas, Toby Lobb, John McDonnell (Johnny Mac), Jon Cleave (Cleavie) and Bill Hawkins.

In the original line-up, all of the members of the group "grew up within half a mile of Port Isaac harbour" except for John McDonnell who is a Yorkshireman. Three were fishermen, and the others were linked to the sea through service as coast guards or lifeboatmen; hence the name, 'The Fisherman's Friends'. Peter Rowe was the oldest founding member. He died in January 2021 at the age of 88.

In 2009 BBC Radio presenter Johnnie Walker was in Cornwall on holiday and came across two of their homemade CDs. Walker's manager, Ian Brown, travelled to Port Isaac and negotiated a recording contract worth £1 million for them with Universal Music Group, who released their first commercial album the following year.

Jon Cleave is one of the MCs of the group and also the author/illustrator of the children's book series Gully as well as the full length, humorous novel Nasty Pasty.

They sing the chorus on Show of Hands' song "Cousin Jack" and the title track of Show of Hands' "best of" CD Roots.

=== Repertoire ===
Their repertoire includes both shanties and other nautical songs, some of which are fairly lewd.

With the addition of Nicholas and Lobb (accordion and guitar) to the founding members of the group, they have included musical accompaniment in their performances. Lobb and former member Hawkins were previously both supported by Vintage Guitars and regularly use their instruments on stage. Toby now performs using Takamine guitars while Jason is supported by Allodi Accordions.

In 2023 the band brought in accomplished musicians and vocalists Simon Johnson and Marcus Bonfanti to their live performance line up. Both had previously appeared in previous albums recorded by the band.

=== Notable performances ===
The group performed at the 2010 Cornbury music festival in Oxfordshire, at the Glastonbury Festival on several occasions, typically on the Acoustic Stage, but on one occasion performing on the Pyramid Stage, and at the Cambridge Folk Festival. The band have also appeared at Towersey Festival, Wickham Festival, Beautiful days, Costa Del Folk, Shrewsbury Folk Festival, Tunes in the Dunes, Boardmasters and Celtic Connections, among others.

Because they are semi-professional, the band do not tour extensively, but usually embark on short tours in November and February/March. They still occasionally perform for charity in Port Isaac, singing on The Platt (at the back of the beach) in the summer.

=== Recordings ===
The group released three CDs themselves before signing with Universal. In 2002, under the name Port Isaac's 'Fishermen's Friends', they recorded an album, primarily to raise funds for the Royal National Lifeboat Institution, which was released on the Clovelly label (#CLCD12702). The album, titled Fishermen's Friends Are Home from the Sea, has 20 tracks and was recorded in St Peter's Church, Port Isaac, on 26 and 27 April 2002. All the tracks are sung in the traditional a cappella style. The album was engineered by Bob Whitney and produced by John Perkins. Their first album with Universal, Port Isaac's Fisherman's Friends, was recorded in St Kew Parish Church, Cornwall, and released in April 2010.

In 2010 they re-recorded their single, "No Hopers, Jokers or Rogues", with new lyrics, in support of England's FIFA World Cup campaign in South Africa.

A second album with Universal, One and All, was released on 26 August 2013. The single "Mary Anne", taken from the album, was released on 25 June 2013.

In July 2015 the album Proper Job was released on the Sony Music label, in association with the St Austell Brewery, who brew a beer of the same name. This album also saw the first appearance of new member Toby Lobb.

In 2018 group released Sole Mates, an album produced by Giles Woolley and band member Toby Lobb. Their aim was to celebrate their history and create a simpler album that represented their live sound more accurately. Sole Mates comprised tracks that the band had performed during their previous two tours and featured additional instrumentation from Phil Beer from Show of Hands and Emma Murfin from Cornwall-based folk act Black Velvet.

=== Television ===
Gareth Malone's documentary on sea shanties, shown in May 2010 on BBC 4, included a contribution from the group. The Fisherman's Friends have also starred in an advert for the fish company, Young's Seafood.

The band have appeared on BBC One's The One Show on two occasions, been the subject of an ITV1 documentary that charted their early success, a Sky Arts documentary which featured their performance at the Celtic Connections festival, BBC's Countryfile with John Craven and many local news items.

2018 also saw them feature in the Songs of Praise Christmas Special.

=== Feature film ===
The producers of the film, Fisherman's Friends, bought the band's life rights to be made into a feature film. The writers Nick Moorcroft, Meg Leonard and Piers Ashworth adapted their story for the screen. Principal photography commenced on 30 April 2018 for 5 weeks on location in Port Isaac and London. The film was directed by Chris Foggin and was released in cinemas nationwide in the UK on 15 March 2019.

The film stars an ensemble cast headed by James Purefoy, Daniel Mays and Tuppence Middleton, with David Hayman, Dave Johns, Noel Clarke, Maggie Steed, Sam Swainsbury and Christian Brassington playing key supporting roles. The film is based around a largely fictional story of Danny, a music industry executive who signs them to a London record label and develops a relationship with one of the band member's daughters, played by Middleton, and covers the period up to their first album release.

All members of the band have cameos in the film and, according to Ashworth, "the singing is a blend of the voices of the group themselves and of the actors."

In August 2022 a sequel titled Fisherman's Friends: One and All was released. The film covers them struggling to put together a second album, and how it leads them to perform on the Pyramid Stage at Glastonbury.

=== Stage musical ===
A stage musical called Fisherman's Friends: The Musical based on the band's true story and the 2019 film made its world premiere at the Hall for Cornwall in Truro in October 2021, written by Amanda Whittington and directed by James Grieve.

=== Awards ===
At the 2011 BBC Radio 2 Folk Awards The Fisherman's Friends received The Good Tradition Award for keeping folk music alive and bringing it to new audiences.

== Fatal accident ==
On 9 February 2013, a heavy steel door fell while the G Live venue in Guildford was being prepared for a Fisherman's Friends show, killing their tour manager Paul McMullen. Singer Trevor Grills was knocked to the floor, suffered serious head injuries, and died in hospital two days later.

Following an investigation into the tragedy, the company supplying the steel door, Express Hi-Fold Doors, was fined £30,000 for breaching health and safety regulations, but the company director was cleared of manslaughter and gross negligence.

== Discography ==
=== Albums ===
Title	Details	Chart positions	Certification
Title	Details	UK	Certification
Suck'em and Sea	Released: 2000; Format: CD; Label: Marine Records	—	
Home from the Sea	Released: 2002; Format: Digital download, CD; Label: Clovelly	—	
Another Mouthful From ... The Fisherman's Friends	Released: 2009; Format: Digital download, CD; Label: Marine Records	—	
Port Isaac's Fisherman's Friends	Released: 26 April 2010; Format: Digital download, CD; Label: Island Records	9	BPI: Gold
One and All	Released: 26 August 2013; Format: Digital download, CD; Label: Island Records	29	
Proper Job	Released: 10 July 2015; Format: Digital download, CD; Label: Sony Music	—	
Sole Mates	Released: 20 April 2018; Format: Digital download, CD; Label: Cod and Chips	—	
One and All — Music from the Movie	Released: 19 August 2022; Format: Digital download, CD; Label: Island Records	—	
All Aboard	Released: 19 January 2024; Format: Digital download, CD; Label: Mighty Village	—	

=== Singles ===
Title	Year	Album
"Roots" (Show of Hands, Fisherman's Friends sing the chorus)	2006	Non-album single
"Back of the Net"	2010	Non-album single
"Mary Anne"	2013	One and All
