= Mary Byrne (singer) =

Irish singer-songwriter

- Born: Mary Byrne; 3 November 1959 (age 66); Ballyfermot, Dublin, Ireland
- Genres: Easy Listening; pop; Pop rock; rock; Disco
- Occupation: Singer
- Instrument: Vocals
- Years active: 2010–present
- Labels: Sony Music (2010–11); Universal Music (2011–12); Decca Records (2011—)

Mary Byrne (born 3 November 1959) is a top 10 selling Irish singer and TV presenter based in Ireland and the UK. Byrne rose to fame in 2010 after becoming a contestant on the seventh series of The X Factor. After being the twelfth contestant eliminated, she signed a record deal with Sony Music Ireland. Byrne and her fellow The X Factor finalists gained a number-one single on the UK Singles Chart and the Irish Singles Chart with a cover of David Bowie's "'Heroes'" in aid of Help for Heroes.

She was also Neil Diamond's special guest at the Aviva Stadium, where she performed in front of 55,000 people. In August 2011, Byrne appeared in GREASE: The Musical at the Grand Canal Theatre in Dublin. She began work on an autobiography, This Is My Life, and was released on 21 October 2011 in the UK and Ireland. Byrne decided to leave Sony Music as she accepted a new record deal offer with Decca Music and Universal Music, who are confident they can "get her music career up and off the ground". She has produced her second album, called ...with Love. In 2012, Byrne appeared on Celebrity Bainisteoir. Byrne was also the main presenter on 3 networks panel show Midday, a show that aired live weekdays in Ireland and follows a format such as the ITV series Loose Women. She was also a co-presenter on the talk show Elaine Crowley.

== Early and personal life ==
Byrne suffered from arthritis in her knees which proved difficult for her during the initial stages of The X Factor, but has led to comical improvisations during her tour with Grease. Before The X Factor, she worked for supermarket chain Tesco, leading to her referral as "Tesco Mary". She quit singing at 28 because of low self-esteem after a failed relationship. After her appearance on The X Factor she admitted on RTÉ's The Late Late Show that she had suffered from clinical depression for a number of years. She performed with her brother, Tommy, under the name The Tommy Lee Experience. In 2008 she won the Irish television singing contest Nollaig No. 1 using the name Mary Lee and released the single "Siúil Leat".

== Music career ==
=== 2010: The X Factor ===
Byrne entered reality television show The X Factor in 2010. Her employer, Tesco Ireland, started a campaign to persuade all staff to support her. Byrne advanced to the live shows and was mentored by Louis Walsh in his Over 28s category. On the first live show, Byrne gained the most public votes by singing "It's a Man's Man's Man's World". Byrne's song "I (Who Have Nothing)" that was successful in Dublin was a relief to Walsh as Simon Cowell was annoyed with him for wanting to stage the auditions there. Byrne was in the 'Final Showdown' twice. In the quarter-final, she was in the Bottom Three with fellow contestants Wagner, and Katie Waissel. As Waissel received the fewest votes she was eliminated first and competed against Wagner in the final showdown. Byrne advanced to the semi-final after Walsh, Dannii Minogue and Cheryl Cole voted to send Byrne through to the semi-final. Although Simon Cowell was not required to vote as there were already three of the four judges voted to send Byrne through to the semi-final, he confirmed that he would’ve also voted to send Byrne through to the semi-final. However, in the semi-final, Byrne was in the bottom two with Cher Lloyd and was eliminated with only her mentor, Walsh voting to send Byrne through to the final, who was the twelfth contestant eliminated. After the series finished, voting statistics revealed that Byrne received more votes than Lloyd. This meant that if there was not a Final Showdown, or if Minogue or Cowell voted to send Byrne through to the final or if the result to deadlock, Byrne would've advanced to the final and Lloyd would've been eliminated.

Mary Byrne's performances on the seventh series of The X Factor UK
When Performed	Song	Result
Audition	"I (Who Have Nothing)"	Through to Bootcamp
Judges Houses	"Fix You"	Through to live shows
Week 1	"It's a Man's Man's Man's World"	Safe (1st) – 22.28%
Week 2	"You Don't Have To Say You Love Me"	Safe (2nd) – 18.55%
Week 3	"I (Who Have Nothing)"	Safe (2nd) – 13.92%
Week 4	"Could It Be Magic"	Safe (3rd) – 11.98%
Week 5	"There You'll Be"	Safe (4th) – 12.02%
Week 6	"Can You Feel the Love Tonight"	Safe (4th) – 10.66%
Week 7	"Something"	Safe (5th) – 11.97%
Quarter-Final	"All I Want Is You" & "Brass in Pocket"	Bottom three (5th) – 11.29%
Final Showdown (Quarter-Final)	"This Is My Life"	Saved by judges' vote
Semi-Final	"Never Can Say Goodbye" & "The Way We Were"	Bottom two (4th) – 14.99%
Final Showdown (Semi-Final)	"It's a Man's Man's Man's World"	Eliminated by judges' vote

=== 2011: Mine & Yours ===
Following her career on The X Factor, Byrne signed a record deal with Sony Music Ireland and began work on her debut album. The album, Mine & Yours, was released in the UK on 28 March 2011, and 25 March in Ireland. Byrne released her debut single, a cover of Martina McBride's "I Just Call You Mine", due to phenomenal demand when the track was debuted from her album Mine & Yours on Irish radio. The fan reaction was so positive that Sony Music Ireland were 'inundated' with requests to make the song available to the public and 'eager fans' prior to the album's release. After little to no promotion, the song peaked at number 12 on the Irish Singles Chart. Byrne revealed her album would be sold on QVC like Susan Boyle did to help sell a few more copies. In an interview with Digital Spy Byrne stated;

Recording this album was a dream come true. I'm so grateful for all of the support I received both during and after the show. Nothing I'm experiencing now would have been possible without the wonderful people who picked up their phone each weekend and voted for me! I hope you enjoy listening to the album as much as I enjoyed making it.

— Mary Bryne in an interview with Digital Spy

The album was produced by hit-maker, Nigel Wright and contains tracks which Byrne performed on The X Factor. However, the songs on the album are not her performances from the show. Byrne was on the 2011 The X Factor Live Tour, and Sony Music began planning Byrne's first solo concert tour before she decided to move onto Universal music. Mine & Yours debuted at number-one on the Irish Album Charts on 31 March 2011.

=== 2011: ...with Love ===
On 13 September 2011, it was announced that Mary Byrne had asked to end her record deal with Sony, and asked to switch to Universal. It was later announced that she had started working on a second album, produced by Phil Coulter, to be released in Ireland by Universal Music Ireland, and in the UK by Decca UK. On 2 November, Mary Byrne stated on her Facebook page that her latest album, which is called ...with Love, would be released in Ireland on 25 November. Her management team later announced that the album would be released the following year in March for the UK. She appeared on The Late Late Show the day of Ireland release, and talked to Ryan Tubridy after performing a song on the album called "Thank God That This Was My Life", written for her by Phil Coulter.

=== 2012: "An Evening With Mary Byrne & Phil Coulter" ===
Byrne began a concert featuring her latest songs from the album with Phil Coulter at the INEC, Killarney and in the Royal Theatre, Castlebar in April 2012. Initially, one night was planned for the acts to perform in the Olympia Theatre, Dublin on 8 May 2012. However, the public demand for tickets was so overwhelming, 5 extra nights were added, eventually resulting in a total of a 6 night residency leading up to 13 May 2012. Both Mary Byrne and Phil Coulter performed individually throughout the shows, but they also sang numerous duets. The shows were met with a number of standing ovations from the audience and an encore on each of the six nights. Despite the fact the concert was initially intended to showcase songs from "...with Love", Byrne sang several songs from her début album "Mine and Yours" and other songs which did not appear on either album.

=== Autobiography ===
In November 2011, Byrne released an autobiography co-written by Eddie Rowley, entitled This Is My Life, named after the Shirley Bassey hit of the same name. The book was released by O'Brien Press in Ireland and was on the bestseller list for four weeks. During the same time, the book was also released in the United Kingdom. This Is My Life was met by good reviews, not only catering to fans of The X Factor but also regaling stories of a Dublin youth and an exhilarating list of experiences, and thus appealing to a wider audience. Amongst the stories which Byrne narrates throughout the book, she writes of a year which she spent on kibbutz Geva in Israel, travelling Europe whilst working for a Dublin factory, moving homes and even winning a car. The book contains several accounts of failed relationships, and Byrne admits to having a two-year relationship with a colleague. A darker side of the book looks at the deaths of Byrne's parents, and in particular, the heartache which Byrne experienced after the death of her mother, who suffered from suspected Alzheimer's disease. A first hand account is given of life on The X Factor both on stage and backstage through the eyes of a contestant, describing the difficulties Byrne experienced, her true opinions of other contestants and her stance on the judges. The book achieves in combining fifty years of a "salt of the earth" existence with a new-found life of fame, with both sides experienced by the same person.

=== 2013: Magic of the Musicals ===
In March 2014 Byrne recorded "Magic of the Musicals". This reflects her love of the timeless classics. Magic Of the Musicals contains eleven tracks including 'On The Street Where You Live', Cheek To Cheek', and 'Hello Young Lovers'. The album also includes Byrne's first self-penned number, 'Midnight Dreamer'.

=== 2017: Mary Sings The 60s. ===
Crashed Records issued Byrne's latest album entitled 'Mary Sings The 60s. An album full of covers from iconic artists in the 60s era. This album includes the single 'I Just don't know what to do with myself' and duets with John McNicholl.

== Discography ==
=== Studio albums ===
Title	Album details	Peak chart positions		Certifications
Title	Album details	IRL	UK	Certifications
Mine & Yours	Released: 28 March 2011; Label: Sony; Formats: CD, digital download	1	6	IRE: 2× Platinum; UK: Silver
...with Love	Released: 25 November 2011 (IRE) 5 March 2012 (UK); Label: Universal Ireland and Decca UK; Formats: CD, digital download	10	28	IRE: Gold
Magic of the Musicals	Released: 28 March 2014; Label: Hetton Records; Formats: CD, digital download	10	—	
Mary Sings the Sixties	Released: 15 September 2017; Label: Crashed Records; Formats: CD, digital download	76	—	
"—" denotes an album that did not chart or was not released.

=== Singles ===
==== As lead artist ====
Year	Single	Peak chart positions	Album
Year	Single	IRL	Album
2011	"I Just Call You Mine"	12	Mine & Yours

==== As featured artist ====
Year	Single	Peak chart positions	
Year	Single	UK	IRE
2010	"Heroes" (as part of The X Factor finalists)	1	1
