= Mine & Yours =

Studio album by Mary Byrne
- Released: 28 March 2011
- Recorded: 2011
- Genre: Pop, Easy Listening, rock
- Length: 47:12
- Label: Sony Music Ireland
- Producer: Nigel Wright

Mary Byrne chronology
Mine & Yours (2011)	...with Love (2011)

Singles from Mine & Yours
- 1. "I Just Call You Mine" Released: 4 March 2011

Mine & Yours is the debut album by Irish singer Mary Byrne. The album was released on 25 March 2011 in Ireland, and 28 March 2011 in the UK. The album's lead single, "I Just Call You Mine" was released on 4 March 2011 in Ireland and 8 March in the United Kingdom. The album was recorded in Sphere Studios, London and produced by music producer, orchestrator and songwriter Nigel Wright. Sales for the album have been strong in Ireland and reasonable in the UK. The album was the 15th best selling album in Ireland in the year 2011.

== Background ==
Byrne's album came about after she was signed by Sony Music Ireland. The album was recorded in Sphere Studios, London and produced by Nigel Wright. It contains 12 songs, 7 of which are songs she performed on The X Factor. Byrne said the album was a dream come true as she had dreamt of the moment all her life. She has confirmed that her management is planning her own debut tour, following the release of the album. Byrne also admitted that it felt very ‘surreal’ to be promoting her debut album. She added: “The record company rang me just a moment ago and told me it’s doing well on the pre-orders, which feels amazing. I performed on QVC last week and that’s what got the sales rocketing – I didn’t believe that could happen. The album includes familiar tracks which Byrne performed on The X Factor such as "It's a Man's Man's Man's World", "I (Who Have Nothing)" and "The Way We Were". Byrne stated that every song featured on the album has a "special meaning" to her and each song was chosen carefully for the memory or the feeling it creates when she sings it. The title of the album reflects Byrne's wish to include her fans in her incredible journey.

== Singles and promotion ==
Byrne's debut single, a cover of Martina McBride's "I Just Call You Mine", was released on 4 March in Ireland and 6 March in the UK. She unveiled it on Irish radio and the fan reaction in Ireland after it was played was "overwhelmingly positive". Sony Music Ireland was "inundated with requests" to have the song available to the public before the album was released later that month. It was announced that Byrne was to release her debut album in time for Mother's Day in March 2011, and at the same time revealed that she would take to shopping channel QVC to "shift some extra copies", hoping it to become as successful as Susan Boyle's album did when she sold her album on QVC. Byrne performed "I Just Call You Mine" and "It's a Man's Man's Man's World".

== Track listing ==
The track listing was confirmed by the record company, Sony Music.

1. "It's a Man's Man's Man's World"
2. "I Just Call You Mine"
3. "Something"
4. "You're My World"
5. "I Who Have Nothing"
6. "The Way We Were"
7. "Galileo"
8. "This Is My Life"
9. "You Don't Have to Say You Love Me"
10. "All I Want Is You"
11. "Always on My Mind"
12. "Unbreakable"

== Charts ==
Chart (2011)	Peak position
Irish Albums Chart	1
UK Albums Chart	6
