= 2009 in country music =

This is a list of notable events in country music that took place in 2009.

== Events ==
- February 27 – Billy Grammer celebrates his 50th Grand Ole Opry anniversary
- June 10 – Carrie Underwood and Keith Anderson at the City of Hope Softball Challenge at Greer Stadium.
- August – After 36 years of using the Billboard Hot Country Songs chart as the basis of its program, American Country Countdown begins using the Mediabase chart.
- August 10 – Brooks & Dunn announce that they are disbanding in 2010 after two decades as a duo.
- August 25 – Jack Ingram sets Guinness Book of World Records mark for most consecutive radio interviews in 24 hours, having done 215 consecutive interviews for five minutes each.
- September 13 – Taylor Swift becomes the first country music artist to win an MTV Music Video award at the 2009 event, winning a Best Female Video for "You Belong with Me". Hip hop artist and producer Kanye West interrupts Swift's acceptance speech, implying that another video should have won instead. This results in a media stir for several days; eventually, West apologizes – first on his blog, and then by personally contacting Swift.
- October 15 – Garth Brooks announces that he is emerging from retirement to perform shows in Las Vegas. These concerts will be held approximately fifteen weekends per year until the year 2014. His first set of performances already sells out.
- December 2 – Rodney Atkins and Keith Anderson at the 100.3 KILT Ten Man Jam.

== Top hits of the year ==
The following songs placed within the Top 20 on the Hot Country Songs or Canada Country charts in 2009:

US	CAN	Single	Artist
20	38	15 Minutes	Rodney Atkins
14	31	All I Ask For Anymore	Trace Adkins
1	1	Already Gone	Sugarland
1	2	Alright	Darius Rucker
11	—	Always the Love Songs	Eli Young Band
1	37	American Ride	Toby Keith
10	14	Barefoot and Crazy	Jack Ingram
32	8	Belongs to You	Emerson Drive
9	23	Best Days of Your Life	Kellie Pickler
1	3	Big Green Tractor	Jason Aldean
4	34	Bonfire	Craig Morgan
2	27	Boots On	Randy Houser
26	10	Brothers	Dean Brody
1	1	Country Boy	Alan Jackson
1	2	Cowboy Casanova	Carrie Underwood
2	1	Cowgirls Don't Cry	Brooks & Dunn featuring Reba McEntire
2	4	Do I	Luke Bryan
2	14	Don't	Billy Currington
2	40	Don't Think I Can't Love You	Jake Owen
1	1	Down the Road	Kenny Chesney with Mac McAnally
11	37	Eight Second Ride	Jake Owen
20	—	Everything Is Fine	Josh Turner
1	2	Feel That Fire	Dierks Bentley
7	4	Fifteen	Taylor Swift
1	8	Gettin' You Home (The Black Dress Song)	Chris Young
1	4	God Love Her	Toby Keith
1	4	Here	Rascal Flatts
1	4	Here Comes Goodbye	Rascal Flatts
16	8	Honky Tonk Stomp	Brooks & Dunn featuring Billy Gibbons
17	—	How 'bout You Don't	The Lost Trailers
18	31	I Just Call You Mine	Martina McBride
1	1	I Run to You	Lady Antebellum
2	1	I Told You So	Carrie Underwood featuring Randy Travis
18	—	I Will	Jimmy Wayne
8	40	I'll Just Hold On	Blake Shelton
6	6	I'm Alive	Kenny Chesney with Dave Matthews
9	34	In Color	Jamey Johnson
16	13	Indian Summer	Brooks & Dunn
1	1	It Happens	Sugarland
1	1	It Won't Be Like This for Long	Darius Rucker
13	3	It's a Business Doing Pleasure with You	Tim McGraw
1	—	It's America	Rodney Atkins
17	6	Joey	Sugarland
3	1	Kiss a Girl	Keith Urban
14	43	Last Call	Lee Ann Womack
12	—	Let Me	Pat Green
2	4	Living for the Night	George Strait
10	17	Lost You Anyway	Toby Keith
10	23	Love Your Love the Most	Eric Church
14	5	Marry for Money	Trace Adkins
17	34	More Like Her	Miranda Lambert
1	1	Need You Now	Lady Antebellum
5	3	Nothin' to Die For	Tim McGraw
5	6	One in Every Crowd	Montgomery Gentry
1	1	Only You Can Love Me This Way	Keith Urban
1	1	Out Last Night	Kenny Chesney
1	2	People Are Crazy	Billy Currington
7	38	Red Light	David Nail
11	22	Ride	Martina McBride
1	6	River of Love	George Strait
10	47	Runaway	Love and Theft
1	7	She Wouldn't Be Gone	Blake Shelton
1	14	She's Country	Jason Aldean
12	18	Shuttin' Detroit Down	John Rich
1	4	Sideways	Dierks Bentley
9	6	Sissy's Song	Alan Jackson
1	—	Small Town USA	Justin Moore
11	37	Sounds Like Life to Me	Darryl Worley
1	1	Start a Band	Brad Paisley duet with Keith Urban
11	11	Strange	Reba
2	1	Summer Nights	Rascal Flatts
1	1	Sweet Thing	Keith Urban
18	35	That's a Man	Jack Ingram
1	1	Then	Brad Paisley
1	3	Toes	Zac Brown Band
2	1	Welcome to the Future	Brad Paisley
2	7	Whatever It Is	Zac Brown Band
11	47	Where I'm From	Jason Michael Carroll
2	5	White Horse	Taylor Swift
18	21	Why	Rascal Flatts
15	34	Wild at Heart	Gloriana
1	1	You Belong with Me	Taylor Swift

== Top new album releases ==
The following albums placed within the Top 50 on the Top Country Albums charts in 2009:

US	Album	Artist	Record label	Release date
1	#1s... and Then Some	Brooks & Dunn	Arista Nashville	September 8
7	127 Rose Avenue	Hank Williams Jr.	Curb	June 16
1	American Ride	Toby Keith	Show Dog	October 6
1	American Saturday Night	Brad Paisley	Arista Nashville	June 30
4	Carolina	Eric Church	Capitol Nashville	March 24
1	Defying Gravity	Keith Urban	Capitol Nashville	March 31
2	Doin' My Thing	Luke Bryan	Capitol Nashville	October 6
2	Easy Does It	Jake Owen	RCA Nashville	February 24
1	Feel That Fire	Dierks Bentley	Capitol Nashville	February 3
5	For Our Heroes	Montgomery Gentry	Columbia Nashville	May 26
2	Gloriana	Gloriana	Emblem/Reprise/Warner Bros.	August 4
3	Gold and Green	Sugarland	Mercury Nashville	October 13
1	Greatest Hits II	Kenny Chesney	BNA	May 19
7	Growing Up Is Getting Old	Jason Michael Carroll	Arista Nashville	April 28
1	Hannah Montana: The Movie	Various Artists	Walt Disney	March 24
10	Happiness and All the Other Things	Cross Canadian Ragweed	Universal South	September 1
3	I Told You So: The Ultimate Hits of Randy Travis	Randy Travis	Warner Bros. Nashville	March 17
3	It's America	Rodney Atkins	Curb	March 31
3	Justin Moore	Justin Moore	Valory Music Group	August 11
1	Keep On Loving You	Reba McEntire	Valory Music Group/Starstruck	August 18
5	The List	Rosanne Cash	Manhattan/EMI	October 6
1	Live on the Inside	Sugarland	Mercury Nashville	August 4
6	The Man I Want to Be	Chris Young	RCA Nashville	September 1
8	Natural Forces	Lyle Lovett	Curb/Lost Highway	October 20
4	Now That's What I Call Country Volume 2	Various Artists	Sony	August 25
1	Play On	Carrie Underwood	Arista Nashville	November 3
1	Revolution	Miranda Lambert	Columbia Nashville	September 29
1	Shine	Martina McBride	RCA Nashville	March 24
5	Sing: Chapter 1	Wynonna	Asylum-Curb	February 3
3	Son of a Preacher Man	John Rich	Warner Bros. Nashville	March 24
10	Songs of Love and Heartache	Alan Jackson	Cracker Barrel	November 2
1	Southern Voice	Tim McGraw	Curb	October 20
6	Townes	Steve Earle	New West	May 12
1	Twang	George Strait	MCA Nashville	August 11
1	Unstoppable	Rascal Flatts	Lyric Street	April 7
2	What I'm For	Pat Green	BNA	January 27
2	Wide Open	Jason Aldean	Broken Bow	April 7
10	World Wide Open	Love and Theft	Carolwood	August 25

=== Other top albums ===
US	Album	Artist	Record label	Release date
29	Aged and Confused	Bill Engvall	Warner Bros. Nashville	October 6
14	American Classic	Willie Nelson	Blue Note	August 25
13	Back to Tennessee	Billy Ray Cyrus	Lyric Street	April 7
45	Bad Magick: The Best of Shooter Jennings and the .357's	Shooter Jennings	Universal South	March 24
33	Beautiful Day	Charlie Robison	Dualtone	June 23
13	Behavioral Problems	Ron White	Capitol Nashville	April 21
21	Big Dreams & High Hopes	Jack Ingram	Big Machine	August 25
16	The Boys Are Back	The Oak Ridge Boys	Quarterback	May 19
44	Brothers from Different Mothers	Dailey & Vincent	Rounder	March 31
29	Closer to the Bone	Kris Kristofferson	New West	September 29
22	A Collection of My Best Recollection	George Jones	Cracker Barrel	September 1
32	Country Club	John Doe and The Sadies	Yep Roc	April 14
41	Country Is as Country Does	Colt Ford	Average Joe's	October 6
40	Davisson Brothers Band	Davisson Brothers Band	Yell	March 10
32	Dean Brody	Dean Brody	Broken Bow	April 28
47	Deep in the Heart of Texas: Aaron Watson Live	Aaron Watson	Thirty Tigers	September 15
36	Dolly: Live from London	Dolly Parton	Dolly Records	November 10
19	El Niño Loco	Rodney Carrington	Capitol Nashville	June 16
24	Fight Like a Girl	Bomshel	Curb	October 20
25	The Foundation (bonus tracks)	Zac Brown Band	Cracker Barrel	September 8
28	A Gospel Journey	The Oak Ridge Boys	Gaither	April 21
27	Greatest Hits	Big & Rich	Warner Bros. Nashville	September 29
37	Here with Me	Holly Williams	Mercury Nashville	June 16
38	Hills and Valleys	The Flatlanders	New West	March 31
19	I'm About to Come Alive	David Nail	MCA Nashville	August 18
23	iTunes Originals	Keith Urban	Capitol Nashville	July 21
44	A Little More Country Than That (EP)	Easton Corbin	Mercury Nashville	August 18
20	Live from Bonnaroo	Zac Brown Band	Atlantic/Home Grown/Big Picture	August 4
45	Live from the Suwannee River Jam	Colt Ford	Average Joe's	December 8
43	Live Sessions	Jason Aldean	Broken Bow	November 23
44	The Long Way Home	Terri Clark	EMI Canada/Capitol/BareTrack	September 1
29	Lost Highway	Willie Nelson	Lost Highway	August 11
40	A Moment in Time	Lorrie Morgan	Country Crossing	October 27
19	Mountain Soul II	Patty Loveless	Saguaro Road	September 29
28	Moving On	Casey Donahew Band	Almost Country	September 1
27	My Turn	Tanya Tucker	Saguaro Road	June 30
29	Naked Willie	Willie Nelson	Legacy	March 17
40	Never Going Back	Collin Raye	Saguaro Road	April 28
11	Now That's What I Call a Country Christmas	Various Artists	Sony	October 6
30	Off the Hillbilly Hook	Trailer Choir	Show Dog Nashville	June 9
15	Old Things New	Joe Nichols	Universal South	October 27
50	On the Can	Larry the Cable Guy	Warner Bros. Nashville	July 21
37	The Quiet Times of a Rock and Roll Farm Boy	Big Kenny	Love Everybody/Bigger Picture	November 10
41	The Reason	Diamond Rio	Word	September 22
17	Roadhouse Sun	Ryan Bingham and The Dead Horses	Lost Highway	June 2
20	The Rock	Tracy Lawrence	Rocky Comfort/CO5	June 9
17	The Rose Hotel	Robert Earl Keen	Lost Highway	September 29
32	Sara Smile	Jimmy Wayne	Valory Music Group	November 23
39	Solo (Songs My Dad Loved)	Ricky Skaggs	Skaggs Family	September 15
26	Sounds Like Life	Darryl Worley	Stroudavarious	June 9
19	Tailgate Party	Larry the Cable Guy	Warner Bros. Nashville	September 22
19	Then Sings My Soul	Ronnie Milsap	Star Song	March 10
31	Three Wooden Crosses: The Inspirational Hits of Randy Travis	Randy Travis	Word	March 17
29	Traveling Circus	Phil Vassar	Universal South	December 15
44	Unwrapped	Rascal Flatts	Lyric Street	November 23
13	Willie and the Wheel	Willie Nelson and Asleep at the Wheel	Lost Highway	February 3

== Deaths ==
- January 9 – Jon Hager, 67, one half of the Hager Twins, gained fame on Hee Haw.
- February 3 – Tom Brumley, 74, steel guitarist for Buck Owens' Buckaroos, Ricky Nelson, and Desert Rose Band; member Int'l Steel Guitar Hall of Fame and Texas Steel Guitar Hall of Fame; best known for steel guitar work on "Together Again"
- February 7 – Molly Bee, 69, gained fame through appearances on Hometown Jamboree. (complications from a stroke)
- March 2 – Ernest Ashworth, 80, Grand Ole Opry star, best known for his 1963 Number One hit, "Talk Back Tremblin' Lips".
- March 8 – Hank Locklin, 91, Grand Ole Opry star, best known for his 1960 crossover hit, "Please Help Me, I'm Falling".
- March 25 – Dan Seals, 61, singer-songwriter of the 1980s, best known for his 1985 crossover hit, "Bop". (mantle cell lymphoma)
- April 28 – Vern Gosdin, 74, singer-songwriter known as "the Voice." (complications from a stroke)
- June 10 – Barry Beckett, 66, record producer and session musician (natural causes)
- June 24 – Tim Krekel, 58, country music songwriter ("Cry on the Shoulder of the Road") (cancer)
- July 28 – Reverend Ike, 74, Ike made a guest appearance on Hank Williams Jr.'s single "Mind Your Own Business", a Number One country hit in 1986. (complications from a stroke)
- August 13 – Les Paul, 94, recording innovator and electric guitar inventor, both which have seen significant use in country music (complications from pneumonia)
- August 14 – Warren "Gates" Nichols, 65, steel guitarist and co-founding member of the 1990s group Confederate Railroad (pancreatic cancer).
- September 27 – Ruby Wright, 69, daughter of country music legends Kitty Wells and Johnnie Wright and prominent member of her parents' touring act (heart-related illness)

== Hall of Fame Inductees ==
=== Bluegrass Music Hall of Fame Inductees ===
- Lonesome Pine Fiddlers
- The Dillards

=== Country Music Hall of Fame Inductees ===
- Roy Clark (1933–2018)
- Barbara Mandrell (born 1948)
- Charlie McCoy (born 1941)

=== Canadian Country Music Hall of Fame Inductees ===
- Buffy Sainte-Marie
- Barry Haugen
- John Murphy

== Major awards ==
=== Grammy Awards ===
(presented January 31, 2010 in Los Angeles)

- Album of the Year – Fearless by Taylor Swift
- Best Female Country Vocal Performance – "White Horse", Taylor Swift
- Best Male Country Vocal Performance – "Sweet Thing", Keith Urban
- Best Country Performance by a Duo or Group with Vocal – "I Run to You", Lady Antebellum
- Best Country Collaboration with Vocals – "I Told You So", Carrie Underwood and Randy Travis
- Best Country Instrumental Performance – "Producer's Medley", Steve Wariner
- Best Country Song – "White Horse", Taylor Swift and Liz Rose
- Best Country Album – Fearless by Taylor Swift
- Best Bluegrass Album – The Crow: New Songs for the 5-String Banjo, Steve Martin

=== Juno Awards ===
(presented April 18, 2010 in St. John's)

- Country Album of the Year – Dance with Me, Johnny Reid

=== CMT Music Awards ===
(presented June 16 in Nashville)

- Video of the Year – "Love Story", Taylor Swift
- Male Video of the Year – "Waitin' on a Woman", Brad Paisley
- Female Video of the Year – "Love Story", Taylor Swift
- Group Video of the Year – "Every Day", Rascal Flatts
- Duo Video of the Year – "All I Want to Do", Sugarland
- USA Weekend Breakthrough Video of the Year – "Chicken Fried", Zac Brown Band
- Collaborative Video of the Year – "Start a Band", Brad Paisley and Keith Urban
- Performance of the Year – "Country Boy", Alan Jackson featuring George Strait, Brad Paisley and Dierks Bentley
- Wide Open Country Video of the Year – "All Summer Long", Kid Rock
- Video Director of the Year – Trey Fanjoy
- Nationwide On Your Side Award – Gloriana

=== Academy of Country Music ===
(presented April 18, 2010 in Las Vegas)

- Entertainer of the Year – Carrie Underwood
- Top Male Vocalist – Brad Paisley
- Top Female Vocalist – Miranda Lambert
- Top Vocal Group – Lady Antebellum
- Top Vocal Duo – Brooks & Dunn
- Top New Solo Vocalist – Luke Bryan
- Top New Vocal Duo – Joey + Rory
- Top New Vocal Group – Gloriana
- Top New Artist – Luke Bryan
- Album of the Year – Revolution, Miranda Lambert
- Single Record of the Year – "Need You Now", Lady Antebellum
- Song of the Year – "Need You Now", Lady Antebellum
- Video of the Year – "White Liar", Miranda Lambert
- Vocal Event of the Year – "Hillbilly Bone", Blake Shelton and Trace Adkins

=== Americana Music Honors & Awards ===
- Album of the Year – Written in Chalk (Buddy and Julie Miller)
- Artist of the Year – Buddy Miller
- Duo/Group of the Year – Buddy and Julie Miller
- Song of the Year – "Chalk" (Julie Miller)
- Emerging Artist of the Year – Justin Townes Earle
- Instrumentalist of the Year – Gurf Morlix
- Lifetime Achievement: Songwriting – John Fogerty
- Lifetime Achievement: Performance – Asleep at the Wheel
- Lifetime Achievement: Instrumentalist – Sam Bush
- Lifetime Achievement: Executive – Ken Levitan
- Lifetime Achievement: Producer/Engineer – Jim Rooney

=== American Music Awards ===
(presented in Los Angeles on November 22, 2009)

- Artist of the Year – Taylor Swift
- Favorite Country Female Artist – Taylor Swift
- Favorite Country Male Artist – Keith Urban
- Favorite Country Band/Duo/Group – Rascal Flatts
- Favorite Country Album – Fearless by Taylor Swift

=== ARIA Awards ===
(presented in Sydney on November 26, 2009)

- Best Country Album – I Love This Place (Troy Cassar-Daley)
- ARIA Hall of Fame – Kev Carmody
- ARIA Hall of Fame – The Dingoes

=== Canadian Country Music Association ===
(presented September 13 in Vancouver)

- Fans' Choice Award – Johnny Reid
- Male Artist of the Year – Johnny Reid
- Female Artist of the Year – Crystal Shawanda
- Group or Duo of the Year – Doc Walker
- Songwriter(s) of the Year – "A Woman Like You", written by Johnny Reid and Brent Maher
- Single of the Year – "Brothers", performed by Dean Brody
- Album of the Year – Dance with Me, Johnny Reid
- Top Selling Album – Fearless, Taylor Swift
- Top Selling Canadian Album – Dance with Me, Johnny Reid
- CMT Video of the Year – "A Woman Like You", Johnny Reid
- Rising Star Award – Tara Oram
- Roots Artist or Group of the Year – Corb Lund

=== Country Music Association ===
(presented November 11 in Nashville)

- Entertainer of the Year – Taylor Swift
- Single of the Year – "I Run to You", Lady Antebellum
- Song of the Year – "In Color", Jamey Johnson
- Vocal Group of the Year – Lady Antebellum
- New Artist of the Year – Darius Rucker
- Album of the Year – Fearless, Taylor Swift
- Musician of the Year – Mac McAnally
- Vocal Duo of the Year – Sugarland
- Music Video of the Year – "Love Story", Taylor Swift
- Male Vocalist of the Year – Brad Paisley
- Female Vocalist of the Year – Taylor Swift
- Musical Event of the Year – "Start a Band", Brad Paisley and Keith Urban

=== Hollywood Walk of Fame ===
Stars who were honored in 2009

Crystal Gayle

== See also ==
- Country Music Association
- Inductees of the Country Music Hall of Fame
