= List of number-one country singles of 2009 (Canada) =

Canada Country was a chart published weekly by Billboard magazine.

This 50-position chart lists the most popular country music songs, calculated weekly by airplay on 31 country music stations across the country as monitored by Nielsen BDS. Songs are ranked by total plays. As with most other Billboard charts, the Canada Country chart features a rule for when a song enters recurrent rotation. A song is declared recurrent if it has been on the chart longer than 30 weeks and is lower than number 20 in rank.

These are the Canadian number-one country singles of 2009, per the BDS Canada Country Airplay chart.

Note that Billboard publishes charts with an issue date approximately 7–10 days in advance.

Issue date	Country Song	Artist	Ref.
January 3	"Country Boy"	Alan Jackson	
January 10	"Country Boy"	Alan Jackson	
January 17	"Start a Band"	Brad Paisley with Keith Urban	
January 24	"Start a Band"	Brad Paisley with Keith Urban	
January 31	"Cowgirls Don't Cry"	Brooks & Dunn featuring Reba McEntire	
February 7	"Down the Road"	Kenny Chesney with Mac McAnally	
February 14	"Sweet Thing"	Keith Urban	
February 21	"Down the Road"	Kenny Chesney with Mac McAnally	
February 28	"Down the Road"	Kenny Chesney with Mac McAnally	
March 7	"Down the Road"	Kenny Chesney with Mac McAnally	
March 14	"Down the Road"	Kenny Chesney with Mac McAnally	
March 21	"Sweet Thing"	Keith Urban	
March 28	"It Won't Be Like This for Long"	Darius Rucker	
April 4	"It Won't Be Like This for Long"	Darius Rucker	
April 11	"It Won't Be Like This for Long"	Darius Rucker	
April 18	"I Told You So"	Carrie Underwood featuring Randy Travis	
April 25	"It Happens"	Sugarland	
May 2	"It Happens"	Sugarland	
May 9	"It Happens"	Sugarland	
May 16	"It Happens"	Sugarland	
May 23	"It Happens"	Sugarland	
May 30	"It Happens"	Sugarland	
June 6	"Kiss a Girl"	Keith Urban	
June 13	"Then"	Brad Paisley	
June 20	"Then"	Brad Paisley	
June 27	"Then"	Brad Paisley	
July 4	"Out Last Night"	Kenny Chesney	
July 11	"Out Last Night"	Kenny Chesney	
July 18	"Out Last Night"	Kenny Chesney	
July 25	"I Run to You"	Lady Antebellum	
August 1	"You Belong with Me"	Taylor Swift	
August 8	"You Belong with Me"	Taylor Swift	
August 15	"You Belong with Me"	Taylor Swift	
August 22	"You Belong with Me"	Taylor Swift	
August 29	"Summer Nights"	Rascal Flatts	
September 5	"Summer Nights"	Rascal Flatts	
September 12	"Summer Nights"	Rascal Flatts	
September 19	"Only You Can Love Me This Way"	Keith Urban	
September 26	"Welcome to the Future"	Brad Paisley	
October 3	"Welcome to the Future"	Brad Paisley	
October 10	"Welcome to the Future"	Brad Paisley	
October 17	"Welcome to the Future"	Brad Paisley	
October 24	"Need You Now"	Lady Antebellum	
October 31	"Need You Now"	Lady Antebellum	
November 7	"Need You Now"	Lady Antebellum	
November 14	"Need You Now"	Lady Antebellum	
November 21	"Need You Now"	Lady Antebellum	
November 28	"Need You Now"	Lady Antebellum	
December 5	"Need You Now"	Lady Antebellum	
December 12	"Need You Now"	Lady Antebellum	
December 19	"Consider Me Gone"	Reba (Note: Reba McEntire was credited simply as "Reba" on the release of "Consider Me Gone".)	
December 26	"Consider Me Gone"	Reba	

== See also ==
- 2009 in music
- List of number-one country singles of 2009 (U.S.)
