= List of Hot Country Songs number ones of 2009 =

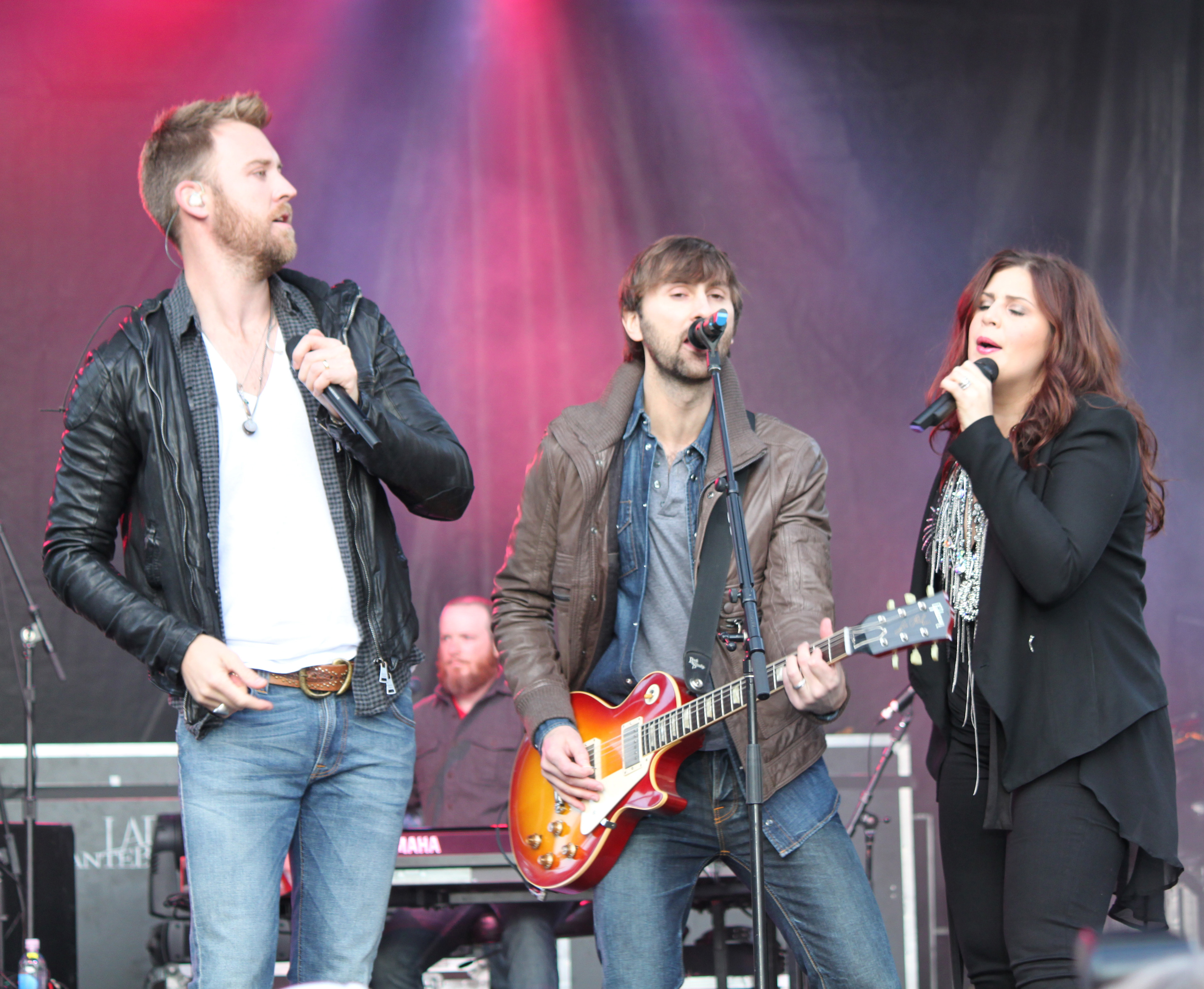
Lady Antebellum achieved its first two number ones in 2009.

Hot Country Songs is a chart that ranks the top-performing country music songs in the United States, published by Billboard magazine. In 2009, 30 different songs topped the chart in 52 issues of the magazine, based on weekly airplay data from country music radio stations compiled by Nielsen Broadcast Data Systems.

Four acts achieved their first number-one hit in 2009. The first was Mac McAnally, whose appearance as a guest vocalist on Kenny Chesney's cover version of his 1990 song "Down the Road" gave him his first appearance at the top of the chart in a career which stretched back to the 1970s. The group Lady Antebellum spent one week at number one in July with its first chart-topper, "I Run to You", and returned to the top with "Need You Now", which spent the last five weeks of the year at number one, the longest spell at the top by a single song. The six weeks which the trio spent at number one was the most by any act in 2009. "Need You Now" also achieved considerable crossover success, topping the Adult Contemporary and Adult Top 40 charts and reaching number 2 in Billboard's all-genre singles chart, the Hot 100. In October, both Justin Moore and Chris Young reached the top spot for the first time, with "Small Town USA" and "Gettin' You Home (The Black Dress Song)" respectively. This would be the first of five consecutive number-one hits for Young over a two-year period.

In addition to Lady Antebellum, Jason Aldean, Dierks Bentley, Kenny Chesney, Toby Keith, Brad Paisley, Rascal Flatts, Darius Rucker and Sugarland all achieved two number ones in 2009. Aldean's "Big Green Tractor" spent four weeks at number one in the fall, the first song to spend four weeks in the top spot since February of the previous year. Keith Urban was the only act to reach number one with three different songs, "Sweet Thing", "Only You Can Love Me This Way", and "Start a Band", a duet with Paisley.

== Chart history ==
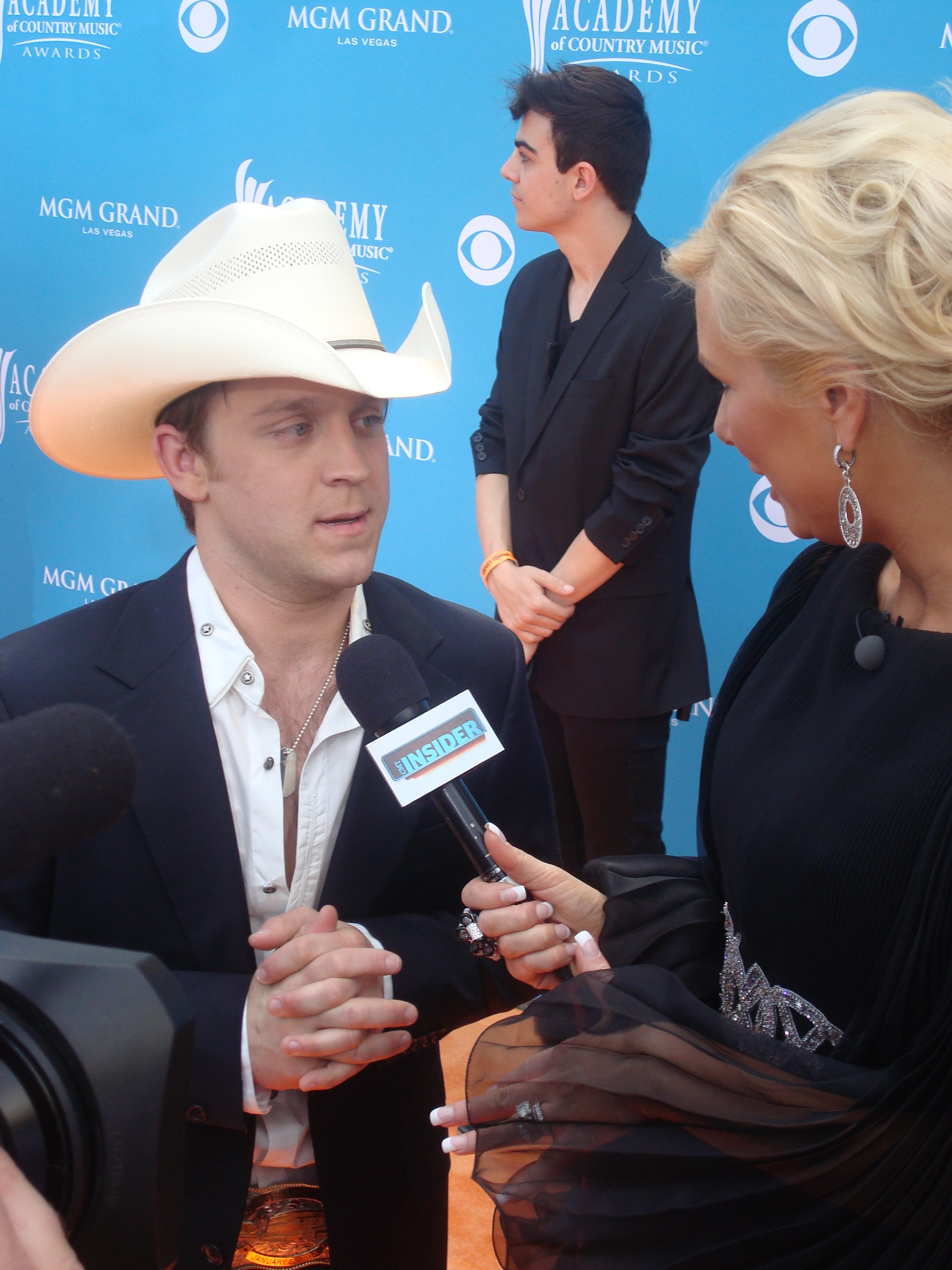
"Small Town USA" gave Justin Moore his first chart-topper in October.

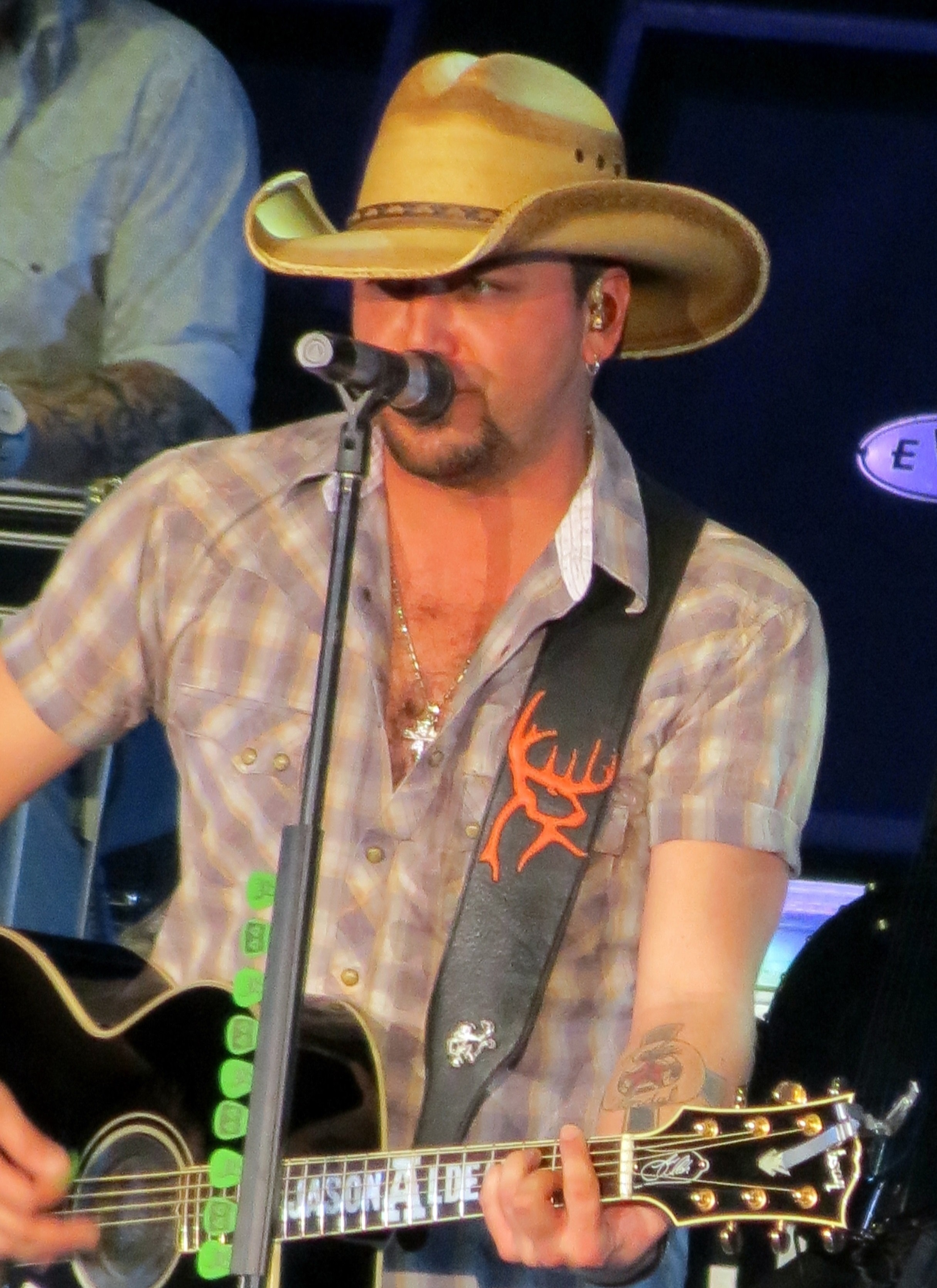
Jason Aldean's "Big Green Tractor" was the first song for eighteen months to spend more than three weeks at number one.

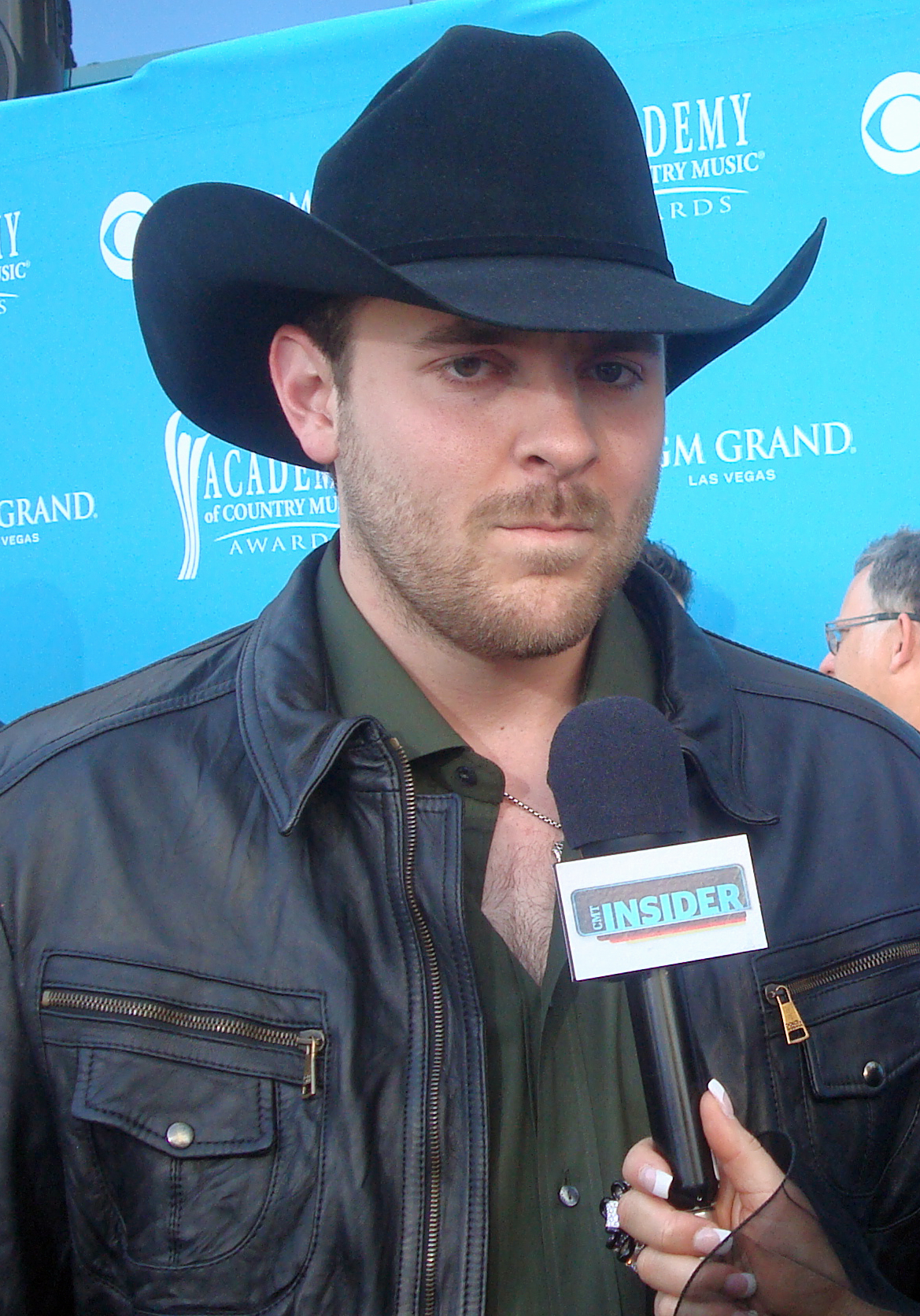
"Gettin' You Home (The Black Dress Song)" was the first of five consecutive chart-toppers for Chris Young.

Issue date	Title	Artist(s)	Ref.
January 3	"Here"	Rascal Flatts	
January 10	"Here"	Rascal Flatts	
January 17	"Already Gone"	Sugarland	
January 24	"Start a Band"	Brad Paisley duet with Keith Urban	
January 31	"Country Boy"	Alan Jackson	
February 7	"She Wouldn't Be Gone"	Blake Shelton	
February 14	"She Wouldn't Be Gone"	Blake Shelton	
February 21	"Feel That Fire"	Dierks Bentley	
February 28	"Down the Road"	Kenny Chesney with Mac McAnally	
March 7	"God Love Her"	Toby Keith	
March 14	"Sweet Thing"	Keith Urban	
March 21	"Sweet Thing"	Keith Urban	
March 28	"It Won't Be Like This for Long"	Darius Rucker	
April 4	"It Won't Be Like This for Long"	Darius Rucker	
April 11	"It Won't Be Like This for Long"	Darius Rucker	
April 18	"River of Love"	George Strait	
April 25	"Here Comes Goodbye"	Rascal Flatts	
May 2	"It's America"	Rodney Atkins	
May 9	"It's America"	Rodney Atkins	
May 16	"She's Country"	Jason Aldean	
May 23	"It Happens"	Sugarland	
May 30	"It Happens"	Sugarland	
June 6	"Then"	Brad Paisley	
June 13	"Then"	Brad Paisley	
June 20	"Then"	Brad Paisley	
June 27	"Out Last Night"	Kenny Chesney	
July 4	"Out Last Night"	Kenny Chesney	
July 11	"Sideways"	Dierks Bentley	
July 18	"Sideways"	Dierks Bentley	
July 25	"I Run to You"	Lady Antebellum	
August 1	"People Are Crazy"	Billy Currington	
August 8	"People Are Crazy"	Billy Currington	
August 15	"Alright"	Darius Rucker	
August 22	"You Belong with Me"	Taylor Swift	
August 29	"You Belong with Me"	Taylor Swift	
September 5	"Big Green Tractor"	Jason Aldean	
September 12	"Big Green Tractor"	Jason Aldean	
September 19	"Big Green Tractor"	Jason Aldean	
September 26	"Big Green Tractor"	Jason Aldean	
October 3	"Small Town USA"	Justin Moore	
October 10	"American Ride"	Toby Keith	
October 17	"American Ride"	Toby Keith	
October 24	"Gettin' You Home (The Black Dress Song)"	Chris Young	
October 31	"Only You Can Love Me This Way"	Keith Urban	
November 7	"Toes"	Zac Brown Band	
November 14	"Toes"	Zac Brown Band	
November 21	"Cowboy Casanova"	Carrie Underwood	
November 28	"Need You Now"	Lady Antebellum	
December 5	"Need You Now"	Lady Antebellum	
December 12	"Need You Now"	Lady Antebellum	
December 19	"Need You Now"	Lady Antebellum	
December 26	"Need You Now"	Lady Antebellum	

== See also ==
- 2009 in music
- List of artists who reached number one on the U.S. country chart
