= ITunes Originals – Keith Urban =

iTunes Originals – Keith Urban

Compilation album by Keith Urban
- Released: 21 July 2009
- Genre: Country music
- Length: 1:02:20
- Label: Capitol Nashville

Keith Urban chronology
Defying Gravity (2009)	iTunes Originals – Keith Urban (2009)	Get Closer (2010)

iTunes Originals – Keith Urban is an album released to iTunes on 21 July 2009 by Australian country music artist Keith Urban.

== Content ==
iTunes Originals – Keith Urban contains twelve interview tracks, in which Urban talks to listeners, telling them about the songs and other events happening before, during, or after the songs' release. It also contains ten previously released singles, as well as the non-single "Raise the Barn" from Love, Pain & the Whole Crazy Thing. Six of these eleven songs have been remixed by iTunes.

== Track listing ==
No.	Title	Writer(s)	Length
1.	"iTunes Original" (interview)		0:04
2.	"How I Got Started" (interview)		1:56
3.	"But for the Grace of God"	Keith Urban, Jane Wiedlin, Charlotte Caffey	3:42
4.	"Follow Up Pressure" (interview)		2:32
5.	"Who Wouldn't Wanna Be Me" (iTunes Originals Version)	Urban, Monty Powell	4:59
6.	"The First Grammy" (interview)		0:50
7.	"You'll Think of Me"	Dennis Matkosky, Ty Lacy, Darrell Brown	4:52
8.	"Making Be Here" (interview)		1:42
9.	"Days Go By" (iTunes Originals Version)	Urban, Powell	3:53
10.	"I Just Loved It" (interview)		1:05
11.	"Making Memories of Us"	Rodney Crowell	4:10
12.	"I Don't Play Piano Very Well" (interview)		0:37
13.	"Tonight I Wanna Cry" (iTunes Originals Version)	Urban, Powell	4:20
14.	"Collaborating" (interview)		0:42
15.	"Raise the Barn" (featuring Ronnie Dunn)	Urban, Powell	5:10
16.	"Getting Ready for a New Album" (interview)		2:27
17.	"Sweet Thing"	Urban, Powell	3:48
18.	"Kisses" (interview)		1:14
19.	"Kiss a Girl" (iTunes Originals Version)	Urban, Powell	3:45
20.	"Metaphors" (interview)		1:01
21.	"'Til Summer Comes Around" (iTunes Originals Version)	Urban, Powell	4:38
22.	"It's a Combination of Things" (interview)		0:46
23.	"Only You Can Love Me This Way" (iTunes Originals Version)	John Reid, Steve McEwan	4:07

== Chart performance ==
Chart (2009)	Peak position
U.S. Billboard Top Country Albums	23
U.S. Billboard 200	153
