= Every Dog Has Its Day =

Single by Toby Keith

from the album American Ride
- Released: March 8, 2010
- Genre: Country
- Length: 3:32
- Label: Show Dog-Universal
- Songwriters: Toby Keith; Bobby Pinson; John Waples
- Producer: Toby Keith

Toby Keith singles chronology
"Cryin' for Me (Wayman's Song)" (2009)	"Every Dog Has Its Day" (2010)	"Trailerhood" (2010)

"Every Dog Has Its Day" is a song co-written and recorded by American country music artist Toby Keith. It was released in March 2010 as the third and final single from his 2009 album American Ride. Keith wrote this song with Bobby Pinson and John Waples.

== Content ==
The song is an uptempo tune in which, upon being asked by an intoxicated man to dance, the narrator's lover replies, "Every dog has its day, dog / And today, dog, just ain't yours."

== Critical reception ==
The song has received mixed reviews from music critics. Juli Thanki of Engine 145 said that the song's "infectious hook is offset by an unfortunate stanza they may have been cribbed from Go, Dog. Go!." Matt Bjorke of Roughstock was more positive about the song, describing the song as "a rollicking modern fiddle-filled honky tonker," "playful and irreverent," and "just the kind of up-tempo Toby Keith is able to excel to." Kevin John Coyne of Country Universe gave the song a failing grade, saying that it contains "horrifically cheesy and terribly executed country metaphors."

== Chart performance ==
The song debuted at number 56 on the U.S. Billboard Hot Country Songs charts for the week of October 17, 2009, at the time his single "American Ride" was at Number One for a second week. It later re-entered the charts at number 47 for the week of March 13, 2010, after the single was officially released.

Chart (2010)	Peak position
Canada Country (Billboard)	6
US Hot Country Songs (Billboard)	15
US Billboard Bubbling Under Hot 100	2
Canada Hot 100 (Billboard)	91
