= Deep Tracks (album) =

Compilation album by Faith Hill
- Released: November 18, 2016
- Genre: Country
- Length: 56:57
- Label: Warner Bros. Nashville
- Producer: Byron Gallimore; Faith Hill; Dann Huff

Faith Hill chronology
Joy to the World (2008)	Deep Tracks (2016)	The Rest of Our Life (2017)

Deep Tracks is the fourth compilation album released by American country music artist Faith Hill. It was released through Warner Bros. Nashville on November 18, 2016, and features a selection of album tracks from Hill's career that were never released as singles, along with three previously unreleased tracks. Upon release, the album entered the Billboard Country Albums chart at No. 22.

== Background ==
Deep Tracks was Hill's first full-length release in eight years and marked the final album in her contract with Warner, which served as label since her 1993 debut. Comprising mostly non-single tracks from her four most recent, non-Holiday studio albums – Faith (1998), Breathe (1999), Cry (2002), and Fireflies (2005) – the compilation also features three previously unreleased songs. One of these, "Why", was recorded in 2004 during the Fireflies album sessions, but ended up not making the final track list. The song was later released by country trio Rascal Flatts, also produced by Dann Huff. "Boy" is one of the last songs she recorded for Warner, while "Come to Jesus" was originally recorded in 2003 and later dedicated by Hill to her late mother.

== Critical reception ==
Professional ratings
Review scores
Source	Rating
AllMusic	3/5 stars

Stephen Thomas Erlewine of AllMusic gave the album a mixed, three out of five star review. "This is straight-down-the-middle AAA country", he writes, "music that might not be hooky enough to be a hit, but that certainly speaks to a well-manicured lifestyle". Of the three previously unreleased tracks, CMT's Alison Bonaguro declared they "sound modern and fresh, regardless of when she recorded them".

== Commercial performance ==
Deep Tracks debuted at number 22 on the Billboard Top Country Albums chart dated December 10, 2016 with 3,900 units sold in its first week. The album failed to enter the Billboard 200 but did reach number 94 on the Top Current Albums chart, which follows a similar methodology but excludes catalog albums.

== Track listing ==
No.	Title	Writer(s)	Original album	Length
1.	"Better Days"	Bekka Bramlett; Billy Burnette; Annie Roboff	Faith	3:28
2.	"Somebody Stand by Me"	Sheryl Crow; Todd Wolfe	Faith	5:51
3.	"If I Should Fall Behind"	Bruce Springsteen	Breathe	4:31
4.	"Free"	Beth Nielsen Chapman; Roboff	Cry	4:40
5.	"If This is the End"	Steve McEwan	Cry	4:57
6.	"Back to You"	Derek Bramble; Lindy Robbins	Cry	4:38
7.	"Unsaveable"	Bramlett; Bobby Terry	Cry	3:54
8.	"If You Ask"	Lori McKenna	Fireflies	4:15
9.	"You Stay with Me"	John Kennedy; Andrea Stolpe	Fireflies	4:23
10.	"Wish for You"	Darrell Brown; Craig Wiseman	Fireflies	3:28
11.	"Boy"	Lee Brice; Rob Hatch; Lance Miller	Deep Tracks (New song)	3:33
12.	"Why"	Rob Mathes; Allen Shamblin	Deep Tracks (New song)	4:54
13.	"Come to Jesus"	Mindy Smith	Deep Tracks (New song)	4:25
Total length:				56:57

== Charts ==
Chart (2016)	Peak position
US Top Country Albums (Billboard)	22
