= Unstoppable (Rascal Flatts song) =

Single by Rascal Flatts

from the album Unstoppable
- Released: January 4, 2010 (radio); February 9, 2010 (Olympic mix)
- Genre: Country
- Length: 3:39 (Olympics mix); 3:48 (album version)
- Label: Lyric Street
- Songwriters: Hillary Lindsey; Jay DeMarcus; James T. Slater
- Producers: Dann Huff; Rascal Flatts

Rascal Flatts singles chronology
"Why" (2009)	"Unstoppable" (2010)	"Why Wait" (2010)

"Unstoppable" is a song written by Hillary Lindsey, Jay DeMarcus, and James T. Slater and recorded by American country music group Rascal Flatts. It was released in January 2010 as the fourth and final single and title track from their 2009 album of the same name. It is also their last single released by Lyric Street Records due to Lyric Street closing its country division, before moving to Big Machine in 2010. The song peaked at number 7 on the US Billboard Hot Country Songs chart.

== Content ==
The song is a ballad, in which the narrator urges to push through tough times ("Love is unstoppable").

For the 2010 Winter Olympics, the band rerecorded the song with altered lyrics, making the song relevant to the Olympic competition. The song appears on the Team USA Soundtrack.

The group performed the song on the March 4, 2010 episode of CSI: Crime Scene Investigation on CBS. They also performed the single on Ellen, the ACM Awards, and American Idol.

At the closing arena show at the 2010 National Scout Jamboree, a video of the Saturn V taking off was followed by the song being played while the screens showed famous Boy Scouts and Eagle Scouts leading up to the Moon and Neil Armstrong stepping on the surface saying his famous line.

== Critical reception ==
Audrey Snyder of Roughstock gave the song a positive review, citing the group’s strong powerful vocals, and commenting, “The lyrics are definitely some of the most meaningful the group has done in a while”

== Music video ==
A music video was released for the song, using the altered lyrics of the Olympic Mix.

== Chart performance ==
"Unstoppable" first charted at number 80 on the U.S. Billboard Hot 100 and also charted at number 100 on the Canadian Hot 100 in 2009 when the album was released. After being released as a single, the song debuted at number 56 on U.S. Billboard Hot Country Songs chart in January 2010. It re-entered at number 92 on U.S. Billboard Hot 100 chart for the week of February 27, 2010 and re-entered at number 83 on the Canadian Hot 100 chart for the week of February 27, 2010. In June 2010, it reached a peak of number 7 on the U.S. Billboard Hot Country Songs chart.

Chart (2010)	Peak position
US Hot Country Songs (Billboard)	7
US Billboard Hot 100	52
Canada Hot 100 (Billboard)	83

=== Year-end charts ===
Chart (2010)	Position
US Country Songs (Billboard)	39
