= Cryin' for Me (Wayman's Song) =

Single by Toby Keith

from the album American Ride
- Released: October 26, 2009
- Genre: Country
- Length: 4:46 (album version); 3:45 (radio edit)
- Label: Show Dog Nashville
- Songwriter: Toby Keith
- Producer: Toby Keith

Toby Keith singles chronology
"American Ride" (2009)	"Cryin' for Me (Wayman's Song)" (2009)	"Every Dog Has Its Day" (2010)

"Cryin' for Me (Wayman's Song)" is a song written and recorded by American country music artist Toby Keith. It was released in October 2009 as the second single from his 2009 album American Ride. The song peaked at number 6 on the US Billboard Hot Country Songs chart.

== Content ==
The song is a mid-tempo country ballad, mostly accompanied by acoustic guitar and saxophone. It was written as a tribute to basketball player and jazz musician Wayman Tisdale, who died on May 15, 2009. In it, the narrator is crying, but states he is not crying for Tisdale's death, rather crying for himself.

Keith had intended to perform the song at Tisdale's funeral, but was too emotional to complete it at the time; instead, he performed Willie Nelson's "Angel Flying Too Close to the Ground."

== Critical reception ==
The song has been generally met with positive reception. Ken Tucker of Billboard magazine said that "Dave Koz's saxophone is a perfect accompaniment to the tender and touching 'Cryin' for Me (Wayman's Song)'," and Entertainment Weekly writer Whitney Pastorek called it a "sweet tribute to a friend who passed away." Bobby Peacock of Roughstock called it "one of the best single releases of Toby's career" and compared its theme to Alan Jackson's "Sissy's Song," "but with a few more personal touches." Jonathan Keefe of Slant Magazine gave a mixed review of the song, saying that it was an example of "his genuinely empathic performances" but criticized the production by saying that the "chintzy" production had a negative effect on the song's sincerity. Sam Gazdziak of Engine 145 gave the song a thumbs-down rating, highlighting some of the specifics of Tisdale's life that were highlighted in the song, but saying, "Maybe if the song were more about those personal touches and less about Keith crying for himself, it wouldn't seem as dreary."

== Music video ==
The music video, directed by Michael Salomon, premiered on CMT on November 2, 2009.

== Chart performance ==
"Cryin' for Me (Wayman's Song)" debuted at number 58 on the Billboard Hot Country Songs on the week of October 17, 2009. During that week, Keith's "American Ride" was at Number One, and two other cuts from the album debuted as well: "Every Dog Has Its Day" at number 56 and "If I Had One" at number 59.

Chart (2009–2010)	Peak position
Canada Country (Billboard)	11
US Hot Country Songs (Billboard)	6
US Billboard Hot 100	73

=== Year-end charts ===
Chart (2010)	Position
US Country Songs (Billboard)	57

== Certifications ==
Region	Certification	Certified units/sales
United States (RIAA)	Gold	500,000^{‡}
^{‡} Sales+streaming figures based on certification alone.
