= Lost You Anyway =

Single by Toby Keith

from the album That Don't Make Me a Bad Guy
- Released: March 16, 2009
- Genre: Country
- Length: 3:39
- Label: Show Dog Nashville
- Songwriters: Toby Keith; Bobby Pinson
- Producer: Toby Keith

Toby Keith singles chronology
"God Love Her" (2008)	"Lost You Anyway" (2009)	"American Ride" (2009)

"Lost You Anyway" is a song co-written and recorded by American country music artist Toby Keith. It was released in March 2009 as the third and final single from his album That Don't Make Me a Bad Guy. The song peaked at number 10 on the US Billboard Hot Country Songs chart. Keith wrote this song with Bobby Pinson.

== Content ==
"Lost You Anyway" is a ballad in which the male narrator looks back on a failed relationship. He lists off various things that he could have done in attempts to keep his lover from leaving, but then says that he probably would have "lost [her] anyway".

== Critical reception ==
Dan Milliken of Country Universe gave the song a C− rating. He said that the lyrics were largely uninspired, but added that the production was solid, and that Keith's vocals were strong. Jonathan Keefe of Slant magazine critic Jonathan Keefe said that although Keith's masculine image tended to make his ballads sound insincere, "Lost You Anyway" was still a better-constructed song in comparison to other similar songs on country radio.

== Chart performance ==
Chart (2009)	Peak position
Canada Country (Billboard)	17
US Hot Country Songs (Billboard)	10
US Billboard Hot 100	69

=== Year-end charts ===
Chart (2009)	Position
US Country Songs (Billboard)	54
