= American Ride (Toby Keith album) =

Studio album by Toby Keith
- Released: October 6, 2009
- Genre: Country
- Length: 42:20
- Label: Show Dog Nashville
- Producer: Toby Keith

Toby Keith chronology
That Don't Make Me a Bad Guy (2008)	American Ride (2009)	Bullets in the Gun (2010)

Singles from American Ride
- 1. "American Ride" Released: July 28, 2009; 2. "Cryin' for Me (Wayman's Song)" Released: October 26, 2009; 3. "Every Dog Has Its Day" Released: March 8, 2010

American Ride is the fifteenth studio album by American country music artist Toby Keith. It was released on October 6, 2009 by Show Dog Nashville. Its lead-off single was the title track, which became his 19th No. 1 single on the Billboard Hot Country Songs charts in October. The album includes 12 songs, 11 of which Keith wrote or co-wrote, and one of which is a tribute to Wayman Tisdale. This was Keith's last album for the Show Dog Nashville label before merging with Universal South to form Show Dog-Universal Music. As of June 2014, the album has sold 500,000 copies and was certified Gold in the U.S. by the RIAA.

== Content ==
As with his last album, 2008's That Don't Make Me a Bad Guy, Keith produced the album himself and wrote most of the songs either by himself or with Bobby Pinson. The title track, also its lead-off single, was written by Joe West and Dave Pahanish; it is the only song on the album which Keith did not co-write, and one of the only singles in his career that he did not co-write. Pahanish and West gave Keith this song because they considered him "the only guy in the world that could get away with cutting it," and he had the demo on his iPod for nearly a year before recording it. On the Billboard Hot Country Songs dated for the week of October 10, 2009, it became his nineteenth Number One hit.

The second single, "Cryin' for Me (Wayman's Song)," was written as a tribute to basketball player and jazz musician Wayman Tisdale, a close friend of Keith's who died on May 15, 2009. This song was released to radio in October 2009. "Every Dog Has Its Day," which Keith and Pinson wrote with John Waples, debuted in March 2010 as the third single release.

== Critical reception ==
Professional ratings
Aggregate scores
Source	Rating
Metacritic	(72/100)
Review scores
Source	Rating
Allmusic	3.5/5 stars
BBC Music	(unfavorable)
Billboard	(favorable)
Entertainment Weekly	B−
Robert Christgau	(choice cut)
Slant Magazine	3/5 stars

The album so far has a score of 72 out of 100 from Metacritic based on 4 "generally positive reviews". Stephen Thomas Erlewine of Allmusic gave American Ride a three-and-a-half star rating out of five. Erlewine's review describes the title track positively, saying that it "casts a cynical eye[…]not celebrating down-home values but wondering where we're all headed[.]" He added that the album "spends more time on the softer side" in comparison to the "swaggering" of most of his previous albums. Ken Tucker of Billboard said that it had "a little less bluster and bravado," calling "Are You Feelin' Me" a "rare show of vulnerability" and "Loaded" a "rocking and rousing" song. It received a B-minus rating from Entertainment Weekly critic Whitney Pastorek, who said that the "brash mockery of current events in the title track offset[s…] a sweet tribute to a friend who passed away" but added, "too few of these samey-sounding songs are memorable." Slant Magazine critic Jonathan Keefe wrote that Keith "walks a fine line between self-mythologizing and self-parody" and said that the "uptempo numbers[…]don't amount to much more than empty posturing," rating the album three stars out of five. In his Consumer Guide, Robert Christgau picked out two songs from the album ("Ballad of Balad" and "Cryin' for Me [Wayman's Song]") as a "choice cut".

== Track listing ==
No.	Title	Writer(s)	Length
1.	"American Ride"	Dave Pahanish; Joe West	2:49
2.	"Gypsy Driftin'"	Toby Keith; Bobby Pinson	4:33
3.	"Are You Feelin' Me?"	Keith; Pinson	3:09
4.	"Every Dog Has Its Day"	Keith; Pinson; John Waples	3:32
5.	"Woke Up on My Own"	Keith; Pinson	3:08
6.	"If You're Tryin' You Ain't"	Keith	3:24
7.	"Cryin' for Me (Wayman's Song)"	Keith	4:46
8.	"If I Had One"	Keith; Pinson	3:14
9.	"You Can't Read My Mind"	Keith; Pinson	3:30
10.	"Tender as I Wanna Be"	Keith	3:28
11.	"Loaded"	Keith; Pinson	2:43
12.	"Ballad of Balad"	Keith	4:02
Total length:			42:20

== Personnel ==
Credits for American Ride adapted from AllMusic.

- David Angell - strings
- Bruce Bouton - pedal steel guitar
- John Catchings - strings
- Perry Coleman - background vocals
- Eric Darken - percussion
- Paul Franklin - dobro, pedal steel guitar
- Kenny Greenberg - electric guitar
- Aubrey Haynie - fiddle, mandolin
- Jim Hoke- jews harp
- Charlie Judge - programming, synthesizer
- Toby Keith - lead vocals
- Dave Koz - saxophone on "Cryin' for Me (Wayman's Song)"
- Brent Mason - electric guitar
- Gayle Mayes - background vocals
- Chris McHugh - drums
- Jerry McPherson - electric guitar
- Marcus Miller - bass guitar on "Cryin' for Me (Wayman's Song)"
- Steve Nathan - keyboards, piano
- Angela Primm - background vocals
- Randy Scruggs - banjo
- Steve Sheehan - acoustic guitar
- Jimmie Lee Sloas - bass guitar
- Arthur Thompson - percussion on "Cryin' for Me (Wayman's Song)"
- Ilya Toshinsky - banjo, acoustic guitar
- Mary Kathryn Van Osdale - strings
- Kristin Wilkinson - strings
- Glenn Worf - bass guitar

== Chart performance ==
=== Weekly charts ===
Chart (2009)	Peak position
Norwegian Albums (VG-lista)	8
US Billboard 200	3
US Top Country Albums (Billboard)	1

=== Year-end charts ===
Chart (2009)	Position
US Billboard 200	172
US Top Country Albums (Billboard)	36
Chart (2010)	Position
US Billboard 200	178
US Top Country Albums (Billboard)	29

== Certifications ==
Region	Certification	Certified units/sales
United States (RIAA)	Gold	500,000^{^}
^{^} Shipments figures based on certification alone.
