= Unstoppable (Rascal Flatts album) =

Studio album by Rascal Flatts
- Released: April 7, 2009
- Studio: Blackbird Studio (Nashville, Tennessee); Capitol Studios (Hollywood, California); River City Studios, Ltd. (Grand Rapids, Michigan); Smart Studios (Madison, Wisconsin); Pogo Studios (Champaign, Illinois)
- Genre: Country
- Length: 45:41 (Standard Edition) 48:56 (J. C. Penney Bonus Track Edition)
- Label: Lyric Street
- Producer: Dann Huff; Rascal Flatts

Rascal Flatts chronology
Greatest Hits Volume 1 (2008)	Unstoppable (2009)	Nothing Like This (2010)

Singles from Unstoppable
- 1. "Here Comes Goodbye" Released: January 20, 2009; 2. "Summer Nights" Released: May 20, 2009; 3. "Why" Released: September 29, 2009; 4. "Unstoppable" Released: January 4, 2010

Professional ratings
Review scores
Source	Rating
Allmusic	2/5 stars
About.com	4/5 stars
Entertainment Weekly	B−
Roughstock	(favorable)
Sputnikmusic	5/5 stars
USA Today	3/4 stars

Unstoppable is the sixth studio album by American country music group Rascal Flatts, and their final album to be released with Lyric Street Records. It was released on April 7, 2009, and produced four singles on the US Billboard Hot Country Songs chart. The album debuted at number one on the Billboard 200 in the U.S. with 351,000 copies sold, making it the band's fourth consecutive number-one debut on the chart. It topped the 1 million mark on October 31, 2009. As of June 2010, the album had sold over 1,230,638 copies in the United States. This was the band's final album to top the Billboard 200.

== Content ==
Three tracks were released as digital singles prior to the album's release: "Forever", "Love Who You Love" and "Things That Matter", on March 17, 24, and 31, respectively.

== Singles ==
The first single, "Here Comes Goodbye", was released on January 20, 2009. The song was co-written by American Idol season 6 finalist Chris Sligh. The band toured in support of the album on the Rascal Flatts American Living Unstoppable Tour, presented by department store chain JCPenney. Editions sold at JCPenney included the bonus track "American Living". "Summer Nights" was released as the second single from the album on May 19, 2009. It reached number 2 on the Billboard Hot Country Songs chart. "Why" was released as the third single from the album on September 29, 2009. It became their lowest-peaking career single to date, peaking at number 18 on the aforementioned chart. "'Unstoppable" was released as the album's fourth single on January 4, 2010, and was a Top 10 hit on the Billboard country chart.

== Critical reception ==
The album overall gained mixed reviews. Matt Bjorke of Roughstock gave the album a favorable review. Similar to his later review of the single "Summer Nights", Bjorke commented that the album would appeal to fans of Rascal Flatts, but would unlikely bring new fans to the group. He specifically cited "Why" as the best track of the album, writing, "This is the kind of song that got me to personally like Rascal Flatts and it's certainly the best track on Unstoppable and "There's gotta be Song of the Year accolades somewhere down the line for this song as it's that powerful."

== Track listing ==
No.	Title	Writer(s)	Length
1.	"Love Who You Love"	Jason Sellers, Neil Thrasher, Paul Jenkins	3:36
2.	"Here Comes Goodbye"	Chris Sligh, Clint Lagerberg, Charles Kelley	4:02
3.	"Close"	Jay DeMarcus, Michael Dulaney, Sellers	3:48
4.	"Forever"	Sellers, Thrasher	4:16
5.	"She'd Be California"	Jenkins, Sellers, Tim Nichols	4:18
6.	"Unstoppable"	DeMarcus, James T. Slater, Hillary Lindsey	3:48
7.	"Things That Matter"	Gary LeVox, Thrasher, Dulaney	4:41
8.	"Summer Nights"	LeVox, Brett James, busbee	4:03
9.	"Holdin' On"	Dulaney, Thrasher, Wendell Mobley	4:25
10.	"Once"	Kara DioGuardi, John Shanks, Jeffrey Steele	3:50
11.	"Why"	Rob Mathes, Allen Shamblin	4:55
Total length:			45:41

JCPenney Bonus Track
No.	Title	Length
12.	"American Living"	3:15

== Personnel ==
Rascal Flatts

- Jay DeMarcus – bass guitar, backing vocals
- Gary Levox – lead vocals
- Joe Don Rooney – electric guitar, backing vocals, acoustic guitar (2, 5, 6, 8, 9), guitar solos (2–11)

Additional musicians

- Tim Akers – keyboards (1)
- Charlie Judge – keyboards (1, 3, 7, 11), synthesizers (2, 4–6, 8–10), loops (2, 4–6, 8–10), lap steel guitar (2, 10), cello (2), acoustic piano (4, 10), electric piano (5), percussion (6, 8), strings (6, 9), Hammond B3 organ (8, 10), string arrangements and conductor (11)
- Gordon Mote – acoustic piano (2, 6, 7, 11)
- Steve Nathan – Hammond B3 organ (5)
- Tom Bukovac – electric guitar (1, 2, 4–6, 8, 9, 11), acoustic guitar (2, 5, 6, 8, 9)
- Dann Huff – electric guitar (1–5, 7–11), mandolin (1, 3), acoustic guitar (2, 4, 10, 11), banjo (3), dobro (10)
- Ilya Toshinsky – acoustic guitar (1–3, 6, 7, 10), bouzouki (1), electric guitar (2, 6)
- Adam Shoenfeld – electric guitar (3, 7, 10)
- Paul Franklin – steel guitar (1–4, 6–8, 11), steel guitar solo (11)
- Dan Dugmore – steel guitar (5, 9, 10)
- Chris McHugh – drums (1–6, 8–11)
- Shannon Forrest – drums (7)
- Eric Darken – percussion (1, 5, 7, 11)
- Jonathan Yudkin – fiddle (1, 6, 8), cello (5), 12-string bass (5), viola (5), violin (5), string arrangements (5), mandolin (7, 11)
- David Campbell – string arrangements and conductor (2)
- Carl Gorodetzky – string contractor (11)
- The London Session Orchestra – strings (2)
- The Nashville String Machine –strings (11)

=== Production ===
- Kirk Boyer – A&R
- Doug Howard – A&R
- Dann Huff – producer
- Rascal Flatts – producers
- Ben Fowler – recording
- Justin Niebank – recording, mixing
- Mark Hagen – overdub recording
- Drew Bollman – recording assistant, mix assistant
- Seth Morton – recording assistant, overdub assistant
- John Netti – recording assistant, mix assistant
- Taylor Nyquist – overdub assistant
- Mark Petaccia – recording assistant, overdub assistant
- Lowell Reynolds – recording assistant, overdub assistant
- Roy Wallace – overdub assistant
- Nathan Yarborough – recording assistant, overdub assistant
- Christopher Rowe – digital editing
- Adam Ayan – mastering at Gateway Mastering (Portland, Maine)
- Darrell Franklin – A&R coordinator
- Mike "Frog" Griffith – production coordinator
- Sherri Halford – art direction
- Ashley Heron – art direction
- Glenn Sweitzer – art direction, package design
- Chris Kubik – cover design
- Fresh Film + Design – package design
- Leann Mueller – photography
- John Murphy – wardrobe
- Melissa Schleicher – hair, makeup

== Chart performance ==
=== Weekly charts ===
Chart (2009)	Peak position
Canadian Albums (Billboard)	7
US Billboard 200	1
US Top Country Albums (Billboard)	1

=== Year-end charts ===
Chart (2009)	Position
US Billboard 200	19
US Top Country Albums (Billboard)	4
Chart (2010)	Position
US Billboard 200	164
US Top Country Albums (Billboard)	28

=== Singles ===
Year	Single	Peak chart positions				
Year	Single	US Country	US	US Pop	US AC	CAN
2009	"Here Comes Goodbye"	1	11	23	13	48
2009	"Summer Nights"	2	37	—	—	61
2009	"Why"	18	102	—	—	—
2010	"Unstoppable"	7	52	—	—	83
"—" denotes releases that did not chart

== Certifications ==
Region	Certification
United States (RIAA)	Platinum
