= 'Til Summer Comes Around =

Single by Keith Urban

from the album Defying Gravity
- Released: 23 November 2009
- Recorded: 2009
- Genre: Country
- Length: 5:31 (album version); 3:53 (radio edit)
- Label: Capitol Nashville
- Songwriters: Monty Powell; Keith Urban
- Producers: Dann Huff; Keith Urban

Keith Urban singles chronology
"Only You Can Love Me This Way" (2009)	"'Til Summer Comes Around" (2009)	"I'm In" (2010)

"'Til Summer Comes Around" is a song co-written and recorded by Australian country music singer Keith Urban. It was released in November 2009 as the fourth single from his 2009 album Defying Gravity. The song peaked at number 3 on the US Billboard Hot Country Songs chart. Urban wrote this song with Monty Powell.

== Content ==
The narrator compares a quiet boardwalk in the wintertime to something being "as empty as [his] broken heart," remembering the times that he and his lover had at the carnival rides there while the boardwalk was open in the summertime. As the song progresses, it is revealed that he has remained in the town for several years, waiting for her to return, as promised, in the summer. It is accompanied mostly by electric guitar and organ.

== Music video ==
Directed by Noble Jones, the music video was released on January 12, 2010. It won the Male Video of the Year Award at the 2010 CMT Music Awards. It was filmed in Santa Monica, CA.

== Critical reception ==
Thom Jurek of Allmusic referred to the song as "haunting, nocturnal, and dreamily textured" in his review of the album. Bobby Peacock of Roughstock said that it was "more substantial" than the album's other three singles and "a standout even among [Urban's] many great ballads." Chris Neal of Country Weekly gave it four-and-a-half stars out of five, saying that "[t]he words paint a vivid picture of a setting that perfectly mirrors the narrator's emotional state" and calling it "one of [Urban's] best [singles] to date."

== Chart performance ==
"'Til Summer Comes Around" debuted at number 41 on the Billboard Hot Country Songs charts dated November 28, 2009. Before the song's release, a Keith Urban fan blog called Urban Country Blog had started a petition to release the song as a single. It also debuted at number 92 on the Billboard Hot 100 and has peaked at number 58. It reached a peak of number three on the Hot Country Songs charts in 2010.

Chart (2009–2010)	Peak position
Canada Country (Billboard)	1
Canada Hot 100 (Billboard)	74
US Billboard Hot 100	58
US Hot Country Songs (Billboard)	3

=== Year-end charts ===
Chart (2010)	Position
US Country Songs (Billboard)	13

== Certifications ==
Region	Certification	Certified units/sales
United States (RIAA)	Gold	500,000^{‡}
^{‡} Sales+streaming figures based on certification alone.

== Awards ==
The song won the 2011 Grammy Award for Best Male Country Vocal Performance on February 13, 2011.
