= Why (Rascal Flatts song) =

Single by Rascal Flatts

from the album Unstoppable
- Released: September 29, 2009
- Genre: Country
- Length: 4:55
- Label: Lyric Street
- Songwriters: Rob Mathes; Allen Shamblin
- Producers: Dann Huff; Rascal Flatts

Rascal Flatts singles chronology
"Summer Nights" (2009)	"Why" (2009)	"Unstoppable" (2010)

"Why" is a song recorded by American country music band Rascal Flatts. It is the third single from their sixth studio album, Unstoppable. It was released to radio stations on September 29, 2009 and debuted at number 44 on the U.S. Billboard US Billboard Hot Country Songs chart for the week of October 10, 2009. It was written by Rob Mathes and Allen Shamblin.

The song was recorded earlier by Faith Hill for a possible inclusion on her 2005 album Fireflies, but ultimately did not make the cut. It was eventually released in 2016 on Deep Tracks.

== Content ==
The song is a ballad, sung from the perspective of a man whose close friend has died by suicide. All three members of Rascal Flatts stated that they had experienced some degree of difficulty recording the song, because each member knew someone close to them that suffered the same fate.

== Critical reception ==
Roughstock gave the song a favorable review. Bobby Peacock of the website says of the song, “The lyrics alone are beautiful.” Chris Neal of Country Weekly gave it three stars out of five, saying that lead singer Gary LeVox "handles the lyric as delicately as its subject matter[…] calls for" but said that the "climactic arena rock guitar solo[…]rob[s] some of the song of its intimacy."

Reviewing the album Unstoppable upon release, Matt Bjorke of Roughstock specifically cited "Why" as the best track of the album, writing, "This is the kind of song that got me to personally like Rascal Flatts and it's certainly the best track on Unstoppable" and "There's gotta be Song of the Year accolades somewhere down the line for this song as it's that powerful."

== Chart performance ==
"Why" peaked at No. 18 on the Billboard Hot Country Songs charts dated for November 14, 2009. It held the peak before falling to No. 19 on the week of November 28 before returning to number 18 a week later. The song did not reach the Billboard Hot 100 proper, but peaked at number 2 on the Bubbling Under Hot 100, which is equivalent to number 102 on Hot 100.

Chart (2009)	Peak position
US Hot Country Songs (Billboard)	18
US Billboard Bubbling Under Hot 100	2
