= Here Comes Goodbye =

Single by Rascal Flatts

from the album Unstoppable
- Released: January 20, 2009 (Radio); March 10, 2009 (iTunes)
- Genre: Country
- Length: 4:04
- Label: Lyric Street
- Songwriters: Clint Lagerberg; Chris Sligh
- Producers: Dann Huff; Rascal Flatts

Rascal Flatts singles chronology
"Here" (2008)	"Here Comes Goodbye" (2009)	"Summer Nights" (2009)

Music video
- "Here Comes Goodbye" at CMT.com

"Here Comes Goodbye" is a song written by American Idol season 6 finalist Chris Sligh and Clint Lagerberg and recorded by American country music group Rascal Flatts, who released it in January 2009 as the first single from their album Unstoppable and the twenty-third single of their career. This song debuted at number 29 on the Billboard Hot Country Songs charts dated for February 7, 2009 and became their 10th number one on the chart dated April 25, 2009. It was nominated for a Grammy Award for "Best Country Performance By A Duo Or Group With Vocals" in 2010.

== History ==
Lagerberg came up with the opening line "I can hear the truck tires coming up the gravel road" after thinking about his childhood home in Maine, which had a long gravel driveway. Sligh then decided to take the line and make it into a song where "something's coming, and it's not good." The opening piano melody came from a melody that Sligh played when Lagerberg was checking on Sligh's daughter, and decided to use it because they thought that it would capture the listener's attention.

== Content ==
"Here Comes Goodbye" is a power ballad beginning with piano accompaniment. The lyric explains the male narrator's realization that his lover is about to leave him. A string section and electric guitar accompaniment backs the song from the second verse onward, and an electric guitar solo precedes the bridge.

== Critical reception ==
The song has received mixed reviews from music critics. Jim Malec of The 9513 gave it a "thumbs down" rating. His review criticized it for "having an overly dramatic production in contrast to its underdeveloped lyrics", which he thought "made the song sound awkward". He describing Gary LeVox' vocals as "atypically restrained andricher and considerably less whiney [sic] than usual" in the first verse but said that his delivery became "hilarious in its urgency" as the song progressed. Blake Boldt of Country Universe gave it a C rating, also thinking that LeVox "gracefully handle[d]" the first verse but "tumbl[ed] into operatic tendencies toward the end." He also considered it a "copycat" of the band's 2006 single "What Hurts the Most".

Matt Bjorke of Roughstock gave a more favorable review. Although he referred to the song's structure as a "well-worn power ballad path", he considered LeVox' performance "nuanced" and overall thought that the song was "better than anything on the trio's previous album Still Feels Good."

== Music video ==
The music video was directed by Shaun Silva. The video features a family visiting a graveyard of a lost father. The man is accompanied by a small boy, waiting to take him to heaven, who is revealed to be the daughter's son, whose grave is side by side with her father's. Throughout the video, the band's members are shown singing the song in a snowy backdrop. It was filmed over 3 days: the first day the band was filmed on an LA soundstage; the second and third days were filmed on a snowy ranch property in Park City, Utah. Actress Kadee Strickland from the ABC show Private Practice was cast as the lead female. The video was nominated for Group Video of the Year at the 2010 CMT Music Awards.

== Chart performance ==
Rascal Flatts released "Here Comes Goodbye" to radio on January 20, 2009. It is the group's twenty-third single release overall, and the lead-off single to their sixth studio album, Unstoppable. The song debuted at number 29 on the Billboard Hot Country Songs charts dated for February 7, 2009 and reached number 1 on the chart dated April 25, 2009. To claim the top spot, "Here Comes Goodbye" jumped 6-1, the biggest climb to Number One since Taylor Swift sent "Our Song" 6-1 on the chart dated December 22, 2007. "Here Comes Goodbye" is also the group's tenth Number One.

Chart (2009)	Peak position
US Hot Country Songs (Billboard)	1
US Billboard Hot 100	11
US Billboard Pop 100	23
US Adult Contemporary (Billboard)	13
Canada Country (Billboard)	4
Canada Hot 100 (Billboard)	48
Japan (Japan Hot 100)	33

=== Year-end charts ===
Chart (2009)	Position
US Country Songs (Billboard)	34
US Adult Contemporary (Billboard)	30

== Cover versions ==
- Aaron Kelly covered the song in the top 24 round of the ninth season of American Idol
- Season 12 American Idol runner-up Kree Harrison covered the song in the Top 3 round.
- Brynn Cartelli covered the song in the Knockout Rounds of the fourteenth season of The Voice.
