= Summer Nights (Rascal Flatts song) =

Single by Rascal Flatts

from the album Unstoppable
- Released: May 19, 2009
- Genre: Country pop; country rock
- Length: 4:02
- Label: Lyric Street
- Songwriters: Brett James; Gary LeVox; busbee
- Producers: Dann Huff; Rascal Flatts

Rascal Flatts singles chronology
"Here Comes Goodbye" (2009)	"Summer Nights" (2009)	"Why" (2009)

"Summer Nights" is a song recorded by American country music group Rascal Flatts. It was written by the band's lead singer Gary LeVox, along with Brett James and busbee. It was released in May 2009 as the second single from their sixth studio album Unstoppable.

== Content ==
"Summer Nights" is an up-tempo country song celebrating summertime by inviting others to join in a party.

== Critical reception ==
Matt Bjorke of Roughstock said that the song was "light hearted" and "feel-good" and would appeal to Rascal Flatts' fans, but said that he did not think that it would be well received by those who dislike the band's mainstream sound. Mandi Byerly of Entertainment Weekly said that the song sounded like it came from the High School Musical soundtrack.

== Other versions ==
Rascal Flatts re-recorded the song with Ashley Cooke on their 2025 album Life Is a Highway: Refueled Duets. They also re-recorded the song as "Tahoe Nights" which was used as the theme song for the 2026 American Century Championship on NBC.

== Chart performance ==
"Summer Nights" debuted at number 57 on the Billboard Hot Country Songs chart dated for April 18, 2009, based on unsolicited airplay received while their then-current single "Here Comes Goodbye" was climbing the charts. "Summer Nights" held this position for two weeks before falling from the charts. It re-entered at number 53 on the same chart dated for May 16, 2009, and entered the Top 40 at number 30 two weeks later. The song peaked at number 2 on the U.S. Billboard Hot Country Songs chart. The song did peak at number one on the Canadian country charts.

== Charts ==
=== Weekly charts ===
Chart (2009)	Peak position
US Hot Country Songs (Billboard)	2
US Billboard Hot 100	37
Canada Country (Billboard)	1
Canada Hot 100 (Billboard)	56

=== Year-end charts ===
Chart (2009)	Position
US Country Songs (Billboard)	20
