= Defying Gravity (Keith Urban album) =

Studio album by Keith Urban
- Released: 31 March 2009
- Recorded: 2008–09
- Studios: Blackbird (Nashville, Tennessee); Hound's Ear (Franklin, Tennessee); RAK (London, UK); The Castle (Franklin, Tennessee)
- Genres: Country; country rock
- Length: 48:17
- Label: Capitol Nashville
- Producers: Dann Huff; Keith Urban

Keith Urban chronology
Greatest Hits: 18 Kids (2007)	Defying Gravity (2009)	Get Closer (2010)

Singles from Defying Gravity
- 1. "Sweet Thing" Released: November 3, 2008; 2. "Kiss a Girl" Released: March 10, 2009; 3. "Only You Can Love Me This Way" Released: June 29, 2009; 4. "'Til Summer Comes Around" Released: November 23, 2009; 5. "I'm In" Released: May 10, 2010

Professional ratings
Review scores
Source	Rating
Allmusic	4/5 stars
Rolling Stone	2/5 stars
Slant Magazine	2.5/5 stars
Entertainment Weekly	B

Defying Gravity is the sixth studio album by Australian country music artist Keith Urban. It was released on March 31, 2009 via Capitol Records Nashville. The album produced five singles, released between 2008 and 2010 respectively.

The album sold 171,000 copies during its first week of release. The album was nominated for both the Grammy Award for Best Country Album and the Country Music Association Award for Album of the Year but lost both to Taylor Swift's Fearless.

== Background ==
The title Defying Gravity comes from the lyrics of "If Ever I Could Love" ("Your heart and mine tonight are defying gravity"), a phrase that Urban said "really defined the joyous, optimistic and uplifting spirit that seemed to show itself while making the album." The track "I'm In" was previously recorded by Radney Foster (as a duet with Abra Moore) on his 1998 album See What You Want to See and later by The Kinleys in 2000 from their album II. Just like Urban's version, both Foster's and The Kinleys' versions were singles.

"Sweet Thing", which Urban co-wrote with Monty Powell, is the album's lead-off single. It topped the Billboard country singles chart in March 2009. Urban and Powell also wrote the second single "Kiss a Girl", which peaked at number 3 that same year. "Only You Can Love Me This Way" was released in June 2009 as the album's third single and it went to number 1 as well. The fourth single, "'Til Summer Comes Around", was released in November 2009. Urban's rendition of "I'm In" was released as the album's fifth and final single in May 2010.

"Hit the Ground Runnin'" was made into a music video despite not being released as a single from the album.

== Reception ==
=== Commercial ===
Upon its release, Defying Gravity reached number 1 on the all-genre Billboard 200 albums chart, becoming the first album of Urban's career to do so. It sold 171,000 copies in the first week. It has sold 879,000 copies in the United States as of August 2010. The album was certified Platinum by the RIAA on 21 September 2010 for a million copies shipped.

=== Critical ===
Defying Gravity has received mixed reviews from music critics. Jonathan Keefe of Slant Magazine gave it two-and-a-half stars out of five, saying that the album lacked the "rawness" of his earlier albums. He also said that most of the songs, including its first two singles, were "retread"s of his earlier hits, and that his version of "I'm In" was inferior to The Kinleys'. In addition, he considered the love ballads "schmaltzier impulses", although he also said that it was "a rebound from the bloated, self-indulgent Love, Pain & the Whole Crazy Thing" (Urban's last studio album) and noted that "Sweet Thing" showed Urban's and Huff's ability to use a banjo effectively in a rock-influenced song. Rolling Stone critic Mark Kemp, who gave the album two stars out of five, said that it lacked the ambition of Love, Pain & the Whole Crazy Thing and had "idyllic" themes.

Thom Jurek gave a four-out-of-five rating in his review for Allmusic. Jurek also noted Urban's use of banjo in more rock-oriented songs, as well as the variety of instruments used overall. He described the first two singles and the "I'm In" cover favorably, saying of "I'm In" that its backing vocals recalled The Rolling Stones, and he called the final track ("Thank You") a "nakedly open paean to wife Nicole [Kidman]." In addition, Jurek considered the album's sound an expansion on Love, Pain & the Whole Crazy Thing by "seamlessly combining hook-laden crafty songwriting with a pop sensibility in the modern country vernacular that blazes a new trail." In addition, Entertainment Weekly critic Whitney Pastorek gave a B rating, saying that the album had "Kidman-centric lyrics" but also showed "a gift for making radio-baiting hooks and production feel enthusiastically fresh."

== Track listing ==
No.	Title	Writer(s)	Length
1.	"Kiss a Girl"	Keith Urban; Monty Powell	3:46
2.	"If Ever I Could Love"	Urban; Darrell Brown	5:00
3.	"Sweet Thing"	Urban; Powell	3:48
4.	"'Til Summer Comes Around"	Urban; Powell	5:31
5.	"My Heart Is Open"	Urban; John Shanks	5:29
6.	"Hit the Ground Runnin'"	Jerry Flowers; Tony Martin; Mark Nesler	3:24
7.	"Only You Can Love Me This Way"	Steve McEwan; John Reid	4:07
8.	"Standing Right in Front of You"	Urban; Rick Nowels	4:01
9.	"Why's It Feel So Long"	Urban	3:24
10.	"I'm In"	Radney Foster; Georgia Middleman	4:33
11.	"Thank You"	Urban; Nowels	5:14
Total length:			48:17

== Promotion ==
iTunes had an exclusive offer called "Countdown to Defying Gravity" where every week fans would be able to download a podcast where Urban talks about the song. Also, iTunes had a "Complete My Album" where fans would complete the whole album and get a bonus track, a cover, "Call My Name" originally recorded by the Christian band Third Day for their Revelation album.

Urban appeared on Today and The Ellen DeGeneres Show on 1 April. He sang "Sweet Thing" and "Kiss a Girl" on both shows. He performed "Kiss a Girl" at the Academy of Country Music awards on 12 April.

== Personnel ==
- Tim Akers – keyboards
- Bruce Bouton – steel guitar
- Tom Bukovac – ambience, 12-string electric guitar, acoustic guitar, electric guitar
- Eric Darken – percussion
- Stuart Duncan – fiddle
- Jerry Flowers – background vocals
- Dann Huff – ambience, EBow, 12-string electric guitar, acoustic guitar, electric guitar, hi-string guitar, mandocello, mandolin
- Charlie Judge – keyboards, drum loops
- Chris McHugh – drums, percussion
- Rick Nowels – keyboards
- Adam Shoenfeld – ambience, acoustic guitar, electric guitar
- Jimmie Lee Sloas – bass guitar
- Russell Terrell – background vocals
- Keith Urban – banjo, EBow, acoustic guitar, electric guitar, mandocello, mandolin, slide guitar, soloist, lead vocals, background vocals

== Charts and certifications ==
=== Weekly charts ===
Chart (2009)	Peak position
Australian Albums (ARIA)	3
Canadian Albums (Billboard)	4
US Billboard 200	1
US Top Country Albums (Billboard)	1

=== Certifications ===
Region	Certification	Certified units/sales
Australia (ARIA)	Platinum	70,000^{^}
Canada (Music Canada)	Platinum	80,000^{^}
United States (RIAA)	Platinum	1,000,000^{^} / 879,000
^{^} Shipments figures based on certification alone.

=== Year-end charts ===
Chart (2009)	Position
Australian Albums (ARIA)	50
Canadian Albums (Billboard)	40
US Billboard 200	47
US Top Country Albums (Billboard)	10

Chart (2010)	Position
US Billboard 200	129
US Top Country Albums (Billboard)	23

=== Singles ===
Year	Single	Peak chart positions					
Year	Single	US Country	US	US Pop	US AC	CAN	AUS
2008	"Sweet Thing"	1	30	—	—	45	96
2009	"Kiss a Girl"	3	16	20	11	34	87
2009	"Only You Can Love Me This Way"	1	34	—	—	49	—
2009	"'Til Summer Comes Around"	3	58	—	—	74	—
2010	"I'm In"	2	67	—	—	74	—
"—" denotes releases that did not chart
