= God Love Her =

Single by Toby Keith

from the album That Don't Make Me a Bad Guy
- Released: November 10, 2008
- Recorded: 2008
- Genre: Country
- Length: 3:37
- Label: Show Dog Nashville
- Songwriters: Toby Keith; Vicky McGehee
- Producer: Toby Keith

Toby Keith singles chronology
"She Never Cried in Front of Me" (2008)	"God Love Her" (2008)	"Lost You Anyway" (2009)

"God Love Her" is a song co-written and recorded by American country music artist Toby Keith. It was released in November 2008 as the second single from his 2008 album That Don't Make Me a Bad Guy. On the chart week of March 7, 2009, the song became Keith's 18th number one hit on the US Billboard Hot Country Songs chart. Keith wrote this song with Vicky McGehee.

== Content ==
"God Love Her" is a moderate up-tempo song accompanied by electric guitar. It describes the narrator's love for a preacher's daughter, who despite her own rebellious nature ("she was baptized in dirty water") saves his "soul from the devil".

== Critical reception ==
Jim Malec, a reviewer of The 9513, gave the song a "thumbs up" rating. He described the song as "pretty damn solid", and said that despite its clichéd theme, it was well executed and Keith's vocals showed a "sense of urgency." Dan Milliken, reviewing the song for Country Universe, gave it a C rating. He said that the song "sounds like something any ol' southern rock wannabe might ship to country radio; instead, it's coming from one of the genre's modern greats." He then goes on to say that "it's a cheesy and overblown little piece."

== Music video ==
The music video for the song was released on October 20, 2008 and was directed by Michael Salomon. The video, which stars actress Jillian Nelson, follows the lyrics of the song. The girl is shown in sitting alone in a church, then going outside to run through the woods with a boy. She later gets on the back of his motorcycle and they are shown driving through the countryside. Included with these are scenes of Keith performing the song outside the church and inside a house. It was the only video released from this album.

On January 30, 2009, the music video for "God Love Her" took the top spot of CMT's Top Twenty Countdown, where it remained for two weeks.

== Chart performance ==
Weekly chart performance
Chart (2008–2009)	Peak position
US Hot Country Songs (Billboard)	1
US Billboard Hot 100	36
Canada Country (Billboard)	4
Canada Hot 100 (Billboard)	54

=== Year-end charts ===
Annual chart rankings
Chart (2009)	Position
US Country Songs (Billboard)	18
US Radio Songs (Billboard)	79

== Certifications ==
Region	Certification	Certified units/sales
United States (RIAA)	Platinum	1,000,000^{‡}
^{‡} Sales+streaming figures based on certification alone.
