= You Belong with Me =

2009 single by Taylor Swift

Single by Taylor Swift

from the album Fearless
- Released: April 20, 2009
- Studio: Blackbird (Nashville, Tennessee)
- Genre: Country pop; pop rock; power pop
- Length: 3:51
- Label: Big Machine
- Songwriters: Taylor Swift; Liz Rose
- Producers: Taylor Swift; Nathan Chapman

Taylor Swift singles chronology
"White Horse" (2008)	"You Belong with Me" (2009)	"Fifteen" (2009)

Music video
- "You Belong with Me" on YouTube

"You Belong with Me" is a song by the American singer-songwriter Taylor Swift and the third single from her second studio album Fearless (2008). Big Machine Records released the song to radio on April 20, 2009. Swift was inspired to write "You Belong with Me" after overhearing a telephone call between a touring band member and his girlfriend; she and Liz Rose wrote the lyrics, which discuss an unrequited love. Produced by Swift and Nathan Chapman, "You Belong with Me" has a banjo-led country pop production and incorporates fiddle, mandolin, and rock-influenced bass and electric guitars. Although the single was promoted on country radio, some critics categorized it into 1980s pop fusion genres such as pop rock and power pop.

Early reviews of the song generally praised its radio-friendly production and the emotional engagement of the lyrics, although a few deemed the songwriting formulaic. Some feminist critics took issue with the lyrics as slut-shaming, but retrospective opinions have considered "You Belong with Me" one of Swift's signature songs. At the 2010 Grammy Awards, the song was nominated in three categories, including Song of the Year and Record of the Year. The single reached the top 10 on several charts and received certifications in Australia, Canada, Japan, and New Zealand. In the United States, it peaked at number two on the Billboard Hot 100, and was the first country song to reach number one on both the Hot Country Songs chart and the all-genre Radio Songs chart. The Recording Industry Association of America (RIAA) certified the single seven-times platinum.

Roman White directed the song's music video, which stars Swift as both the antagonist—an unsympathetic, popular brunette cheerleader—and the protagonist—a sympathetic, blonde girl next door who yearns for the antagonist's boyfriend. The video premiered on CMT on May 4, 2009, and won Best Female Video at the MTV Video Music Awards; Swift's acceptance speech was interrupted by Kanye West, which caused a controversy widely covered by the press and instigated a feud between the artists. Following a 2019 dispute about the ownership of Swift's back catalog, she re-recorded the song as "You Belong with Me (Taylor's Version)" for her album Fearless (Taylor's Version) (2021). As of 2024, "You Belong with Me" has been included in the set lists of five of Swift's six headlining tours.

== Background and writing ==
Taylor Swift wrote songs for her second studio album Fearless while touring as an opening act for other country musicians to promote her self-titled debut studio album during 2007 and 2008, when she was 17-to-18 years old. Continuing the romantic themes of her first album, Swift wrote songs about love and personal experiences from the perspective of a teenage girl to ensure her fans could relate to Fearless. The product was a collection of songs about the challenges of love with prominent high-school and fairy-tale lyrical imagery. Swift and Nathan Chapman recorded over 50 songs for Fearless; "You Belong with Me" was one of the 13 tracks that made the final cut. The track, which was recorded by the audio engineer Char Carlson, was produced by Swift and Chapman, and mixed by Justin Niebank at Blackbird Studio in Nashville, Tennessee.

Swift was inspired to write "You Belong with Me" after she overheard a telephone call between a band member and his girlfriend. She recalled him becoming defensive when his girlfriend confronted him, which prompted the opening lines: "You're on the phone with your girlfriend, she's upset. She's going off about something that you said." Out of sympathy for him, Swift imagined herself as a "girl-next-door-itis" character with hidden feelings for a close male friend, whom she understood but who was in a relationship with a popular-yet-"snobby, ridiculous, overrated girl". Swift immediately wrote some lyrics and developed a complete narrative in a songwriting session with Liz Rose. Swift played the pre-chorus and chorus to Rose and sang the lines, "She wears short skirts / I wear T-shirts", which were her favorite to write on the song. Rose suggested Swift write "something about bleachers" and they conceived another lyric: "She's cheer captain and I'm on the bleachers."

== Music and lyrics ==
"You Belong with Me" follows a verse–chorus form that has a pre-chorus between the verse and the chorus. The verse and chorus follow the diatonic I−V−ii−IV chord progression (F♯−C♯−g♯−B) and each chord is maintained for two measures. The pre-chorus, though using the same chords, follows the ii−IV−I−V progression and each chord is maintained for one measure. The track is set to a medium-tempo 4/4 time signature and each section is divided into eight-measure phrases. Swift sings with melodic variation; each section from the verse to the pre-chorus rises in register. Toward the chorus's end, Swift uses melisma on the words "see" and "me" in the lyric "Why can't you see / you belong with me?"—for each of the words, she sings with three notes that descend a short distance (B−A♯) and then a considerable drop (A♯−D♯). The musicologists Nate Sloan and Charlie Harding label this three-note melodic motif the "T-Drop", which also occurs on many of Swift's later songs. (Note: Sloan and Harding said the "T-Drop" is Swift's signature melodic motif in her vocal performance and cited three more examples that showcase this: "Mean" (2010), "State of Grace" (2012), and "Welcome to New York" (2014).)

"You Belong with Me" (Karaoke Version)
A sample of the pre-chorus and chorus: the banjo strums and slide guitar riffs in the pre-chorus submerge in the chorus to make room for dynamic electric guitars

Reviews from mainstream publications generally called "You Belong with Me" a country pop song but many critics and musicologists deemed it a pop song that is applicable to more than one radio format. (Note: Attributed to such publications as Paste, Pitchfork, and Billboard) American Songwriter's Savannah Dantona said it is "openly a pop song influenced by country, not country influenced by pop". Nolan Gasser said the country-music stylistic foundation is in the instruments; banjo strums that drive verses, a pedal steel guitar, occasional slide guitar riffs, and a slight twang in Swift's vocals. As the song progresses into the chorus, the banjo and pedal steel submerge to make room for dynamic electric and bass guitars.

Jody Rosen categorized "You Belong with Me" as power pop, while Gasser wrote that the arrangement is typical pop rock, and Andrew Unterberger of Billboard said the dynamic shift from the verses to the chorus make the track sound "almost ... like a '90s rock song". Gasser, Michael Campbell, and James E. Perone, citing the song structure, rhythm, and collective use of acoustic, electric, and bass guitars, likened the song with 1980s styles of pop rock, new wave, and pop-punk. For Perone, this 1980s connection is in the "highly unusual" incorporation of guitars and country banjo, fiddle, and mandolin in the steady eighth-note texture.

In "You Belong with Me", a female narrator expresses her feelings for a male friend who is in a relationship with an unappreciative girlfriend. The lyrical motifs evoke a typical American high-school setting; the narrator sees herself as an unpopular girl and an "underdog", and the girlfriend is a popular, attractive cheerleader. The narrator appreciates the male friend ("She doesn't get your humor like I do ... She'll never know your story like I do"), and although they share the same sense of humor and an easy rapport, he is unaware of her affection. The narrator discusses the contrasts between herself and the girlfriend in the verses: "She wears high heels, I wear sneakers / She's cheer captain and I'm on the bleachers." Throughout the song, the narrator persuades the male friend to acknowledge her charm.

Some critics found the lyrics melancholy despite the upbeat production and said that, contrary to Swift's status as an attractive and popular figure, her narrator's position as an unpopular girl contributes to her reliability and popularity among her audience. Ken Tucker of NPR wrote the lyrics and vocals are full of "intense ache" that effectively conveys adolescent yearning. Gasser described the narrative lyrics as the most profound country influences on "You Belong with Me", while Tom Breihan of Pitchfork found its narrative about unrequited love reminiscent of "the most fragile, heartbroken strains of twee indie pop". In the Edmonton Journal, Amanda Ash said the lyrics are not as sentimental because Swift's character "mocks a guy for his choice in women but also sheds a tear for his blindness".

== Release and commercial performance ==
Before Fearless was released, Big Machine Records made "You Belong with Me" available for download exclusively via the iTunes Store in November 2008 as part of the promotional campaign "Countdown to Fearless". The track debuted at number 12 on the US Billboard Hot 100, tying Swift with the Jonas Brothers for the most top-20 debuts (five) within one calendar year.

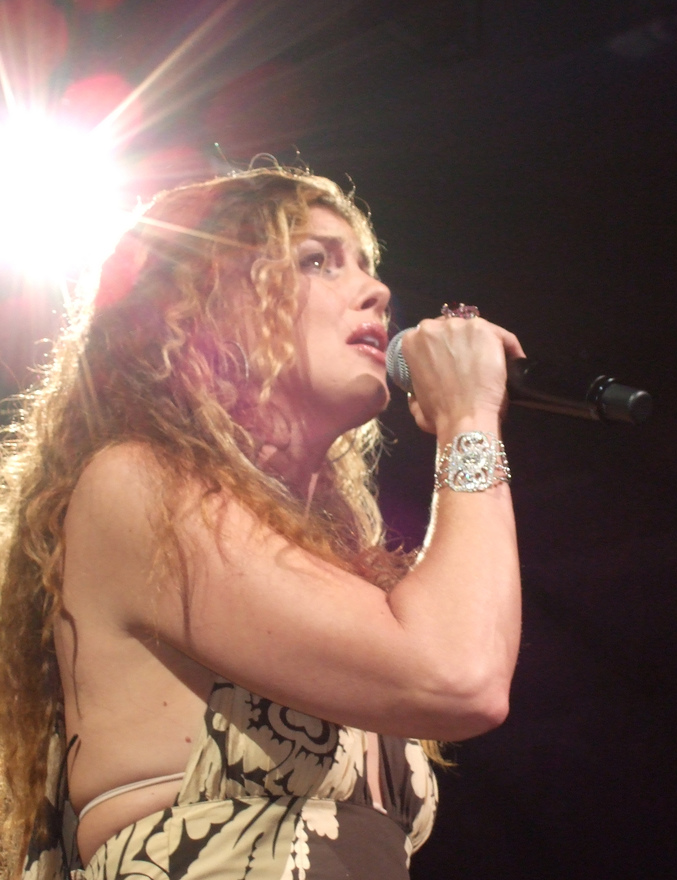
"You Belong with Me" was the first country song to reach number one on Billboard's Radio Songs and had the biggest crossover airplay audience since "Breathe" by Faith Hill (pictured) in 2000.

Big Machine released the song to US country radio on April 20, 2009, as the third single from Fearless. The track was released to US contemporary hit radio on May 18, 2009, by Big Machine in partnership with Republic Records. The single peaked at number two on the Billboard Hot 100 in August 2009, kept off the top by the Black Eyed Peas' "I Gotta Feeling". Driven by non-country airplay, the song gained the largest crossover radio audience since Faith Hill's "Breathe" in 2000. By 2011, it held the record for the highest audience impression for a country artist's song. On the US Radio Songs chart, "You Belong with Me" peaked at number one, becoming Swift's first single and the first country song to do so since Billboard began incorporating Nielsen BDS-monitored data in 1990. On other US airplay charts, it spent two weeks atop Hot Country Songs and 14 weeks atop Adult Contemporary, and it peaked at number two on both Pop Songs and Adult Pop Songs charts. It was the second-most-played song on US radio of 2009 behind Fearless's lead single "Love Story". The Recording Industry Association of America (RIAA) certified "You Belong with Me" seven-times platinum for passing seven million units based on sales and streaming, and the single had sold 4.9 million copies in the United States by July 2019.

In the United Kingdom, "You Belong with Me" was released as a single on August 24, 2009, on Mercury Records; it peaked at number 30 on the UK Singles Chart and the British Phonographic Industry (BPI) certified it double platinum. The single peaked within the top 10 on charts in Canada (three), Australia (five), New Zealand (five), and Japan (10); and it peaked within the top 40 in Ireland (12), Slovakia (17), Hungary (31), and Denmark (32). In Canada, the song reached number one on the airplay charts Canada Country, Canada CHR/Top 40, and Canada Hot AC. The single was certified platinum in Japan, triple-platinum in New Zealand, ten-times platinum in Australia, and double platinum in Canada.

== Critical reception ==
In reviews of Fearless, many critics considered "You Belong with Me" a standout track and recommended it for download. (Note: Attributed to reviews by Rob Sheffield for Blender, Rashod D. Ollison for The Baltimore Sun, Folha de S. Paulo, and Darryl Sterdan for the Ottawa Sun) Some lauded the production as catchy and radio-friendly, qualities to which they attributed the single's crossover success. (Note: Attributed to reviews by The Belfast Telegraph and Chris Williams for Billboard) Craig S. Semon of the Telegram & Gazette described the song as an "irresistible keeper", and Chris Richards of The Washington Post thought that the use of country banjos and new-wave guitars was "perfectly natural". Critics also complimented the way the lyrical sentiments resonate with a broad audience, including adults and Swift's core audience of teenage girls. (Note: Attributed to reviews by Williams, The Belfast Telegraph, Craig Mathieson for The Age, and Leah Greenblatt for Entertainment Weekly) Some reviewers observed sophistication in the songwriting; Josh Love from The Village Voice chose it as one of the album's great songs that display "preternatural wisdom and inclusiveness" and Jon P. McLaughlin of The Province said it captures "the nuances and minutiae" of high-school romance. Ash said the "witty" song adds maturity to Swift's adolescent perspectives compared with the "sappy" single "Teardrops on My Guitar" (2006).

Some critics were more reserved in their praise; Chris Williams of Billboard said the lyrics might seem immature to some listeners and Johnny Davis of The Observer said the high-school imagery "may needle British ears". According to the Tampa Bay Times, the song is generic and too similar to many of Swift's previous singles. After "You Belong with Me" was nominated in three categories at the 52nd Annual Grammy Awards, Slant Magazine's Jonathan Keefe wrote although it is not Swift's best-written song, it stands out among other contenders because "it's hard to fault its construction".

== Accolades and retrospective reviews ==
Pitchfork included "You Belong with Me" at number 69 in its list of the best songs of 2009. It ranked 10th on The Village Voice's Pazz & Jop mass critics' poll for the same year. In 2010, "You Belong with Me" received several industry awards and nominations; at the 52nd Annual Grammy Awards, it was nominated for Song of the Year, Record of the Year, and Best Female Pop Vocal Performance. The track won Favorite Song at the 2010 Kids' Choice Awards and was nominated for Song of the Year at the 45th Academy of Country Music Awards. At the BMI Country Awards organized by Broadcast Music, Inc. to honor the year's most-performed country songs on US radio and television, "You Belong with Me" made Swift the youngest person to win Songwriter of the Year and the first to win Song of the Year three consecutive times following her wins for "Teardrops on My Guitar" in 2008 and "Love Story" in 2009.

Critics have considered "You Belong with Me" one of Swift's signature songs and said its pop-friendly sound preceded her artistic shift from country to mainstream pop. Nate Jones from Vulture (2023) placed "You Belong with Me" second after "All Too Well" in his ranking of Swift's discography; he lauded it as a "classic" about high-school feelings and wrote: "The line about short skirts and T-shirts will likely be mentioned in Swift's obituary one day." Chris Willman from Variety (2022) ranked it first in his list and said the lyrical sentiments about adolescent feelings contribute to the song's enduring popularity and lauded the production as "monstrously hooky". Hannah Mylrea of NME (2022) placed it 22nd out of Swift's 161 songs, and Jane Song from Paste (2020) ranked it eighth out of 158 songs. Rob Sheffield of Rolling Stone and Alexis Petridis of The Guardian were less enthusiastic; Sheffield (2024) ranked it 103rd out of Swift's 274 songs and Petridis said it is somewhat less impactful than "Love Story".

"You Belong with Me" appeared on some all-time rankings. It was ranked among the greatest songs of the 2000s decade by CMT (number eight) and VH1 (number 50). Billboard ranked the chorus of "You Belong with Me" the 20th-greatest in "100 Greatest Choruses of the 21st Century" (2017), saying: "There were about a dozen moments ... you could point to as proof that Taylor Swift would one day become the biggest pop star in the world, but maybe none bigger than the immaculate chorus of ["You Belong With Me"]." The magazine also ranked the track at number 42 on its list of "The 500 Best Pop Songs" (2023) and said "the memorable lyrical passages ... and nuanced vocal runs ... have allowed the song to stand the test of time". "You Belong with Me" ranked first on Teen Vogue's "91 Best Songs About Unrequited Love" (2020).

Some feminist authors regarded "You Belong with Me" as antifeminist or slut-shaming, naming the lyrics contrasting Swift's character in T-shirts and the antagonist girlfriend in short skirts as an act of belittling other women to win men's attention. (Note: As discussed in The Washington Post, The A.V. Club, and MTV News) Sady Doyle deemed the song a "triumph of girl-on-girl sexism" that promotes "moral superiority and '50's-style coy submissiveness", and Lauren Michele Jackson regarded it as a "bouncy jaunt through the valley of 'me versus those other girls' ". In Vulture, Nate Jones said the song, alongside other contemporaneous releases by Swift, was made to appeal to a conservative, red-state audience. In defense of the song, Emily St. James from Vox said the antifeminist interpretations ignore Swift's willingness to "play both women" in the dichotomy of "good-hearted girls next door pining away for cute boys who fell for cheerleader jezebels", and that the song "thrives on earnest vulnerability and raw emotionality".

== Music video ==
=== Background ===
Roman White directed the music video for "You Belong with Me", in which Swift, with a double role, portrays both the protagonist ("the nerd, who is pining away for this guy that she can't have") and the antagonist ("the popular girl, horrible, scary, intimidating and perfect"). The actor Lucas Till, whom Swift had met on the set of Hannah Montana: The Movie in April 2008, portrays the male lead. In a behind-the-scenes video that was aired on Great American Country, Swift elaborated on the narrative, in which the protagonist wishes she could be in the antagonist's position in a relationship with the boy. Filming took place for two days in Gallatin and Hendersonville, both in Tennessee; the prom and football-match scenes were filmed at Pope John Paul II High School, which supplied extras, including students, band members, cheerleaders, and football players. Swift used a body double in scenes that feature both the protagonist and the antagonist. The two dresses Swift used for the ending scene were procured from Jovani Fashion.

=== Synopsis ===
Swift portrays both the protagonist and the antagonist (seen here, a brunette cheerleader), and Lucas Till portrays the love interest in the music video.

The video starts with Till's character arguing with his girlfriend during a telephone call. The protagonist, who has big glasses and curly blonde hair, notices and the two communicate by holding up signs through their adjoining bedroom windows. The boy closes his window, not seeing the blonde holding a sign saying "I love you". In her room, the blonde tries on costumes that are associated with high-school archetypes and dances without knowing the boy is watching through his window; White replaced Swift's choreographed moves with what she described as "the dumbest moves". The next day, the blonde is sitting on a bench reading a book, and the boy approaches and talks with her. The antagonist, with straight brunette hair, arrives and kisses the boy in her car, and gives the blonde a hostile look.

The brunette is a cheerleader at a football game and the blonde sits on the bleachers, performing in the school band, which is played by Swift's touring band. After scoring a winning touchdown, the boy finds his girlfriend flirting with a teammate (played by a friend of Swift's brother Austin Swift), resulting in a heated argument as the blonde watches. Back at their bedroom windows, the boy and the blonde again communicate through signs; he asks her if she is going to prom and she says no. The blonde notices the boy's disappointed look and decides to go to the prom in a white dress without her glasses. The brunette approaches the boy but he ignores her and goes to the blonde. At the end of the video, the boy and the blonde reveal folded signs saying "I love you" to each other and kiss; according to White, this is meant to portray "who she really is" and Swift thought it was a happy ending.

=== Release and reception ===
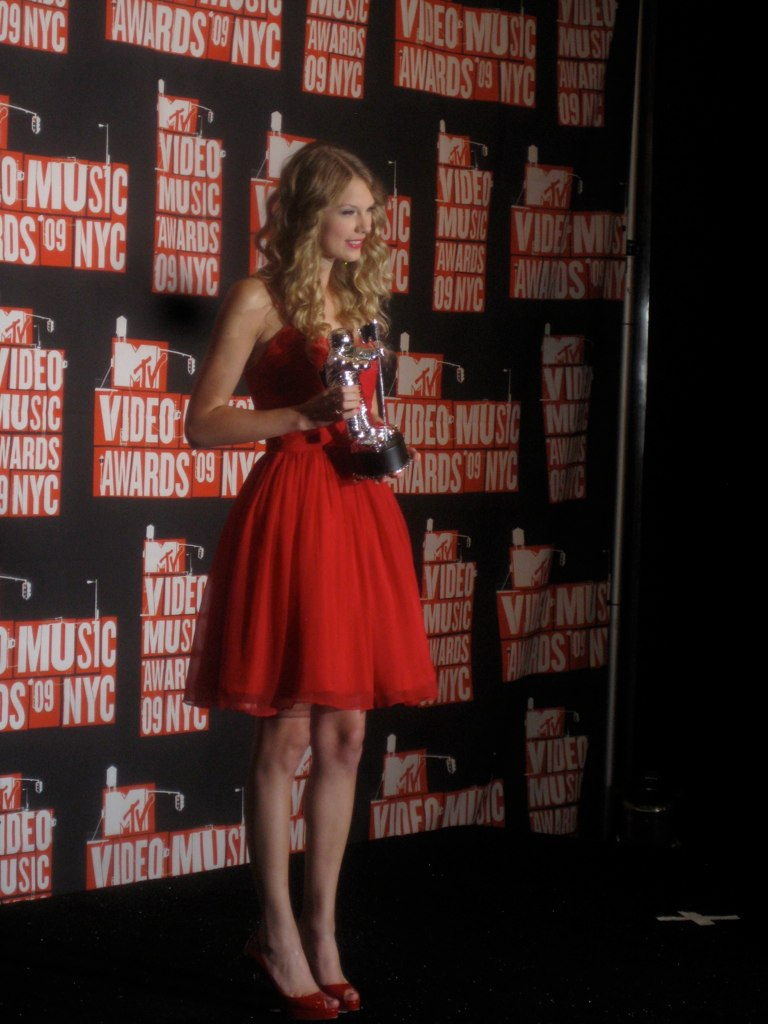
Swift with her trophy for Best Female Video at the 2009 MTV Video Music Awards

The video premiered on May 4, 2009, on CMT. Great American Country aired the video two days later and a 30-minute behind-the-scenes titled Taylor Swift on the Set: You Belong with Me later that month. The video spent 11 weeks at number one on CMT and topped CMT's 2009 year-end Top 20 Countdown, based on sales, airplay, and viewer voting. MTV also put it on rotation. Writing for MTV, Tamar Anitai said the plot and fashion of "You Belong with Me" allude to six teen movies of the late 1990s and 2000s: She's All That, Mean Girls, Drumline, Bring It On, A Cinderella Story, and Nick & Norah's Infinite Playlist; Chris Ryan said it has a similar plot to a rom-com and deemed it the most memorable video on MTV of 2009. The video was nominated for Video of the Year at the 45th Academy of Country Music Awards, Video of the Year and Female Video of the Year at the 2010 CMT Music Awards. At the 2010 MuchMusic Video Awards in Canada, it was nominated for Best International Artist Video and the People's Choice: Favourite International Video.

At the 2009 MTV Video Music Awards, "You Belong with Me" won Best Female Video. During Swift's acceptance speech, the rapper Kanye West entered the stage, grabbed Swift's microphone, and said: "Yo Taylor, I'm really happy for you and I'ma let you finish, but Beyoncé had one of the best videos of all time", referencing Beyoncé's "Single Ladies (Put a Ring on It)", a nominee in the same category. The incident, which became known as "Kanyegate", was widely covered by the press and resulted in many Internet memes. Public reactions turned against West; US President Barack Obama called him a "jackass". West later issued an apology, which Swift accepted. Shaun Cullen, an academic in popular culture studies, deemed the incident an example of American "racial melodrama" that stereotyped a cultural rivalry between a violent, hostile black antagonist and an innocent, gracious white victim. The controversy resonated throughout both West's and Swift's later careers, and influenced their music releases, such as West's 2010 album My Beautiful Dark Twisted Fantasy and 2016 single "Famous", and Swift's 2017 album Reputation.

Critics have considered the video for "You Belong with Me" iconic; Billboard included it in a 2014 list of the "20 Best High School Music Videos". Mary Fogarty and Gina Arnold deemed it a representation of Swift's talent for portraying "contradictory ... performed persona" but maintain her authenticity, and an early example of her cultural status as both "villain and victim" that represents ideals of "an America that has passed into history" and "a feminist future". The "Junior Jewels" T-shirt Swift's blonde character wears became a memorable look; Glenn Rowley writing for the Recording Academy said it "established the goofy side of Swift's personality" and her "willingness to embody characters in her videos". Spin (2017) deemed it Swift's second-best video behind "Blank Space" (2014) and wrote: "This wasn't the last time [Swift] emerged victorious over her supposed bullies (or painted herself as a victim)".

== Live performances ==
During promotion of Fearless in 2009, Swift performed "You Belong with Me" on television shows and events, including The Today Show and the CMT Music Awards. She also performed the song at a mini-concert at Bishop Ireton High School, whose students won a Verizon Wireless contest. At the 2009 MTV Video Music Awards, Swift performed "You Belong with Me"; she first sang the song in a subway station while dressed in a brown trench coat and a black beanie, and continued during a subway ride, taking off the trench coat and revealing a red cocktail dress. Once the subway docked at a stop, Swift completed the performance atop a yellow taxi cab. Billboard, in 2022, ranked it as the 14th-greatest VMAs performance of all time. After the VMAs, Swift performed the song on The View and Saturday Night Live.

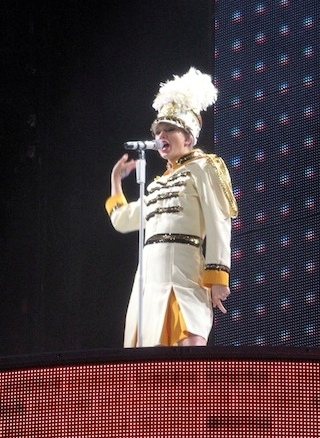
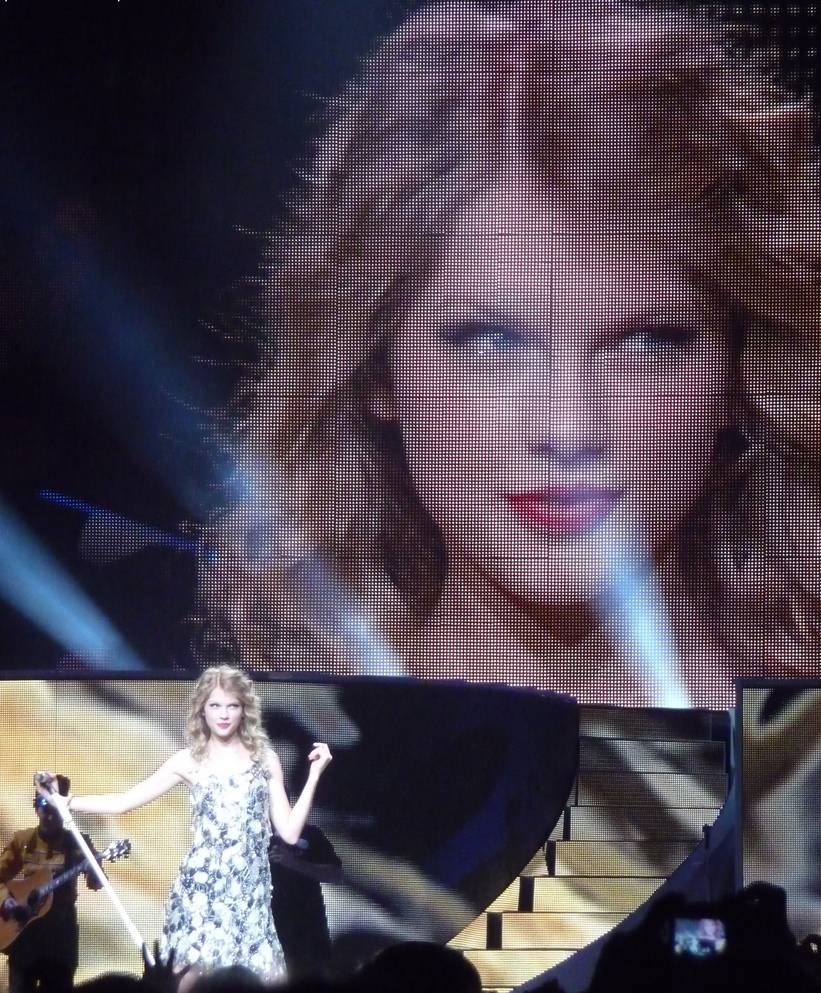
Swift performing "You Belong with Me" as the opening number on the Fearless Tour; she first dressed in a marching band outfit (left) before changing to a sparkling cocktail dress (right)

Swift included "You Belong with Me" in the set lists for the festivals she headlined in 2009, including the Florida Strawberry Festival, the Houston Livestock Show and Rodeo, and the CMA Music Festival. She also performed it on the UK morning show GMTV and at the Sound Relief concert in Australia. "You Belong with Me" was the opening number on the set list of Swift's first headlining concert tour, the Fearless Tour, in 2009 and 2010. Before the concerts began, a screen showed footage of celebrities including Miley Cyrus, Faith Hill, and Garth Brooks sharing their definitions of the word "fearless". When the shows opened, the stage was decorated as a school hallway and background videos showed lockers; six background dancers were dressed as cheerleaders and the seven-member backing band wore marching band outfits. Swift appeared at the top of the stage wearing a drum majorette uniform to sing "You Belong with Me". Midway through her performance, the dancers removed Swift's marching-band outfit to reveal a sparkling silver cocktail dress and boots.

At the 52nd Annual Grammy Awards in February 2010, Swift and Stevie Nicks performed a medley of "You Belong with Me" and "Today Was a Fairytale", and Fleetwood Mac's "Rhiannon". Swift first sang "Today Was a Fairytale", playing an acoustic guitar and dressed in a white blouse and jeans. Swift then duetted with Nicks on "Rhiannon" and again played the acoustic guitar on "You Belong with Me", during which Nicks stood back, tapped her tambourine, nodded and occasionally sang with Swift. For her parts, Swift sang off-key and poorly harmonized with Nicks, resulting in a media response that questioned Swift's vocal ability. Jon Caramanica of The New York Times said it was refreshing to "see someone so gifted make the occasional flub" and that it was necessary for her to have "her facade ... come undone a bit" as her fame grew bigger. Big Machine's CEO Scott Borchetta defended Swift, saying: "Maybe she's not the best technical singer, but she's probably the best emotional singer ... ."

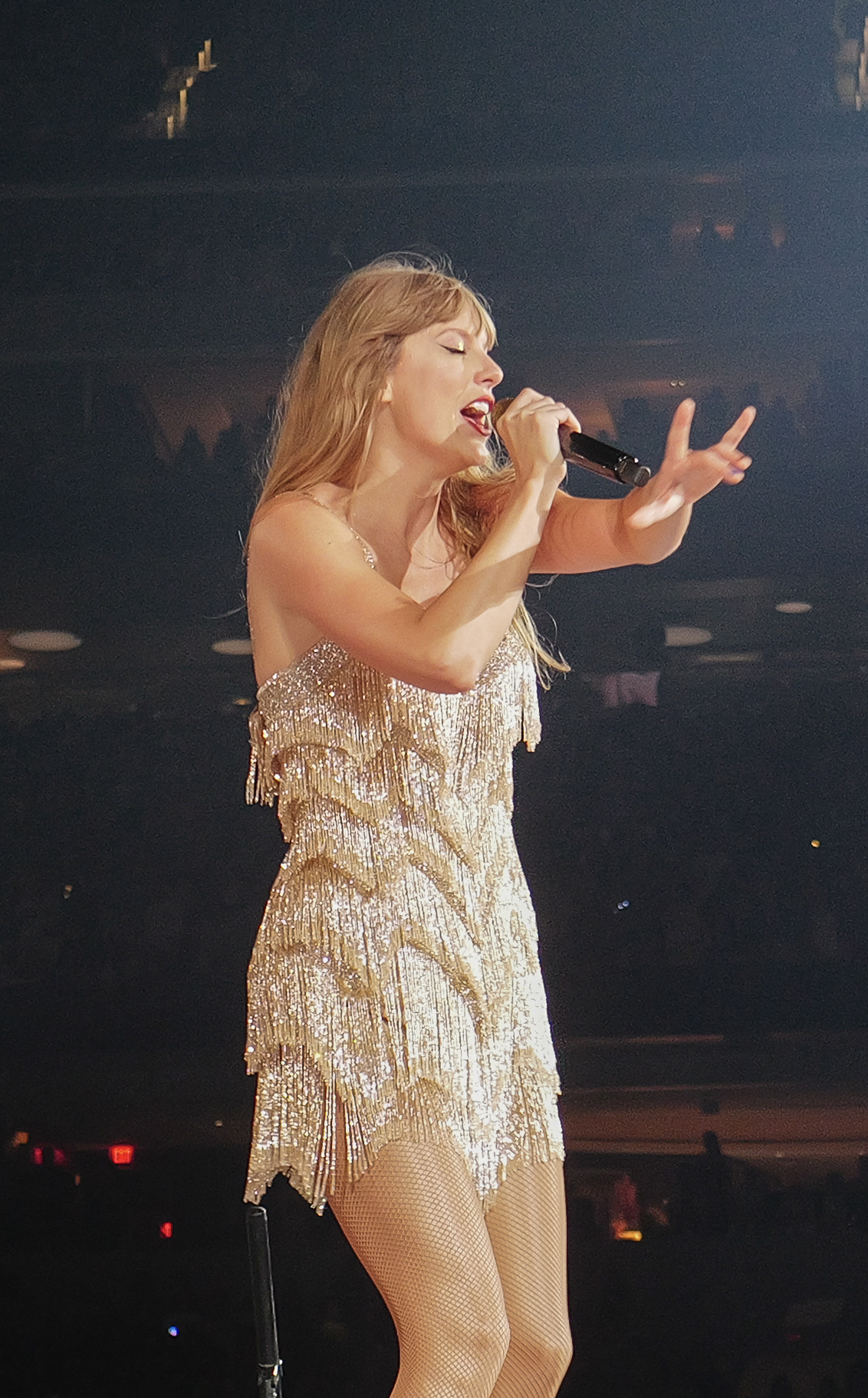
Swift performing "You Belong with Me" on the Eras Tour in 2023

"You Belong with Me" was part of the set list of Swift's second and third concert tours: the Speak Now World Tour in 2011–2012 and the Red Tour in 2013–2014. During the shows of the Red Tour, Swift rearranged the song into a 1960s-girl-group-inspired version. The song was part of Swift's performance at BBC Radio 1's Teen Awards and a VH1 Storytellers episode that was recorded at Harvey Mudd College in California; both took place in October 2012. On several shows of the 1989 World Tour (2015), Swift performed an acoustic version of "You Belong with Me" outside the regular set list. She also sang the song at the Formula One United States Grand Prix on October 22, 2016, and at the pre-Super Bowl event Super Saturday Night on February 4, 2017. She included it in a medley with "Style" and "Love Story" in the set list of her Reputation Stadium Tour (2018). On the Eras Tour (2023–2024), which Swift described as a homage to all of her album "eras", she performed "You Belong with Me" as part of the Fearless era.

== Covers and parodies ==
The singer-songwriter and producer Butch Walker recorded a seven-minute video of himself recording instruments and covering "You Belong with Me", and published it on YouTube in November 2009. In the video, Walker plays drums and tunes a mandolin before singing the song, incorporating lyrics told from a male perspective. The cover was included in a deluxe edition of Walker's 2010 album I Liked It Better When You Had No Heart. His cover is a banjo-led, folk and bluegrass composition. Jonathan Keefe of Slant Magazine described Walker's arrangement as "fantastic" and said it "emphasized the terrific melody and structure that are the song's real selling points".

"You Belong with Me" was parodied by the comedy musician "Weird Al" Yankovic, who titled it "TMZ" and included it on his studio album Alpocalypse (2011). In "TMZ", Yankovic sings about the ways paparazzi and the gossip website TMZ publicize embarrassing material about celebrities. Yankovic said the track does not denote his support for either the paparazzi or the celebrities, and instead makes fun of "everyone's obsession with celebrity culture and how ridiculous it is and why do we even care about any of this". A music video for "TMZ", which Bill Plympton directed, was filmed in October 2010 and included on the album's DVD.

== Personnel ==
Credits adapted from Fearless album liner notes

- Taylor Swift – vocals, songwriter, producer
- Liz Rose – songwriter
- Nathan Chapman – producer
- Steve Blackmon – assistant recording engineer, assistant mixer
- Chad Carslon – recording engineer
- Justin Niebank – mixer

== Charts ==
=== Weekly charts ===
2009–2010 weekly chart performance
Chart (2009–2010)	Peak position
Australia (ARIA)	5
Belgium (Ultratip Bubbling Under Flanders)	11
Belgium (Ultratip Bubbling Under Wallonia)	23
Canada Hot 100 (Billboard)	3
Canada AC (Billboard)	2
Canada CHR/Top 40 (Billboard)	1
Canada Country (Billboard)	1
Canada Hot AC (Billboard)	1
Denmark (Tracklisten)	32
Denmark Airplay (Tracklisten)	11
Hungary (Rádiós Top 40)	31
Ireland (IRMA)	12
Japan Hot 100 (Billboard)	10
Japan Adult Contemporary (Billboard)	2
Mexico Ingles Airplay (Billboard)	10
Netherlands (Single Top 100)	68
New Zealand (Recorded Music NZ)	5
Slovakia Airplay (ČNS IFPI)	17
Sweden (Sverigetopplistan)	47
Switzerland (Schweizer Hitparade)	58
UK Singles (Official Charts)	30
US Billboard Hot 100	2
US Adult Contemporary (Billboard)	1
US Adult Pop Airplay (Billboard)	2
US Hot Country Songs (Billboard)	1
US Pop Airplay (Billboard)	2

2024 weekly chart performance
Chart (2024)	Peak position
Portugal (AFP)	108
Singapore (RIAS)	4

=== Year-end charts ===
2009 year-end charts
Chart (2009)	Position
Australia (ARIA)	17
Canada (Canadian Hot 100)	14
New Zealand (RIANZ)	25
UK Singles (Official Charts Company)	177
US Billboard Hot 100	11
US Adult Contemporary (Billboard)	14
US Adult Pop Songs (Billboard)	15
US Hot Country Songs (Billboard)	13
US Pop Songs (Billboard)	5

2010 year-end charts
Chart (2010)	Position
Canada (Canadian Hot 100)	83
Japan Adult Contemporary (Billboard Japan)	24
US Billboard Hot 100	57
US Adult Contemporary (Billboard)	8

=== Decade-end chart ===
2000–2009 decade-end chart
Chart (2000–2009)	Position
Australia (ARIA)	88

=== All-time chart ===
All-time charts
Chart	Position
US Billboard Hot 100 (1958–2018)	362
US Pop Songs (1992–2017)	67

== Certifications ==
Certifications
Region	Certification	Certified units/sales
Australia (ARIA)	10× Platinum	700,000^{‡}
Brazil (Pro-Música Brasil)	3× Platinum	180,000^{‡}
Canada (Music Canada)	2× Platinum	160,000^{*}
Denmark (IFPI Danmark)	Platinum	90,000^{‡}
Germany (BVMI)	Gold	300,000^{‡}
Japan (RIAJ)	Platinum	250,000^{*}
New Zealand (RMNZ)	3× Platinum	90,000^{‡}
Spain (Promusicae)	Platinum	60,000^{‡}
United Kingdom (BPI)	2× Platinum	1,200,000^{‡}
United States (RIAA)	7× Platinum	7,000,000^{‡}
^{*} Sales figures based on certification alone.^{‡} Sales+streaming figures based on certification alone.

== "You Belong with Me (Taylor's Version)" ==
"You Belong with Me (Taylor's Version)"

Song by Taylor Swift

from the album Fearless (Taylor's Version)
- Released: April 9, 2021
- Studio: Blackbird (Nashville, Tennessee); Prime Recording (Nashville)
- Length: 3:51
- Label: Republic
- Songwriters: Taylor Swift; Liz Rose
- Producers: Taylor Swift; Christopher Rowe

Lyric video
- "You Belong with Me (Taylor's Version)" on YouTube

In 2018, Swift ended her 13-year contract with Big Machine and signed anew with Republic Records. In November 2020, she began re-recording her first six studio albums, which Big Machine had released. The decision followed a 2019 dispute between Swift and the talent manager Scooter Braun, who acquired Big Machine, including the masters of Swift's albums. By re-recording her albums, Swift had full ownership of the new masters, enabling her to control the licensing of her songs for commercial use and therefore substituted the Big Machine–owned masters.

=== Release ===
The re-recording of "You Belong with Me", subtitled "Taylor's Version", was released as part of the album Fearless (Taylor's Version), which Republic Records released on April 9, 2021. One day before the release, the singer-songwriters Olivia Rodrigo and Conan Gray, whom Swift had contacted, posted clips of themselves dancing to excerpts of "You Belong with Me (Taylor's Version)" on TikTok.

"You Belong with Me (Taylor's Version)" charted on the singles charts of Australia (37), Canada (44), Ireland (30), Singapore (20), and the United Kingdom (52). It was certified triple-platinum in Australia, platinum in Brazil, and silver in the United Kingdom. In the United States, the song peaked at number 75 on the Billboard Hot 100 and at number 16 on Hot Country Songs. The track also peaked at number 51 on the Billboard Global 200.

=== Production and reception ===
Swift produced "You Belong with Me (Taylor's Version)" with Christopher Rowe, who recorded her vocals at Kitty Committee Studio in London. David Payne, who was assisted by Lowell Reynolds, recorded the track; and John Hanes, who was assisted by Reynolds and David Garten, engineered it at Black Bird and Prime Recording Studios in Nashville. Musicians included Amos Heller on bass guitar; Mike Meadows on acoustic guitar, banjitar, banjo, and mandolin; Paul Sidoti on electric guitar; Matt Billingslea on drums; and Jonathan Yudkin on fiddle. Caitlin Evenson provided background vocals. Serban Ghenea mixed "You Belong with Me (Taylor's Version)" at MixStar Studios in Virginia Beach.

The arrangement of "You Belong with Me (Taylor's Version)" is identical to that of the original; according to Alexandra Pollard of The Independent, the musical elements were "painstakingly reconstructed". Kitty Empire of The Observer said the re-recording has a "smoother" and more "nuanced" production that is evident in the "interplay between the guitar and banjo", and Lucy Habron of Clash said the more-defined instruments make the song "shinier".

Critics commented that Swift's vocals are the most prominent change and bring forth a new listening experience. Emily St. James commented that, on this recording, Swift's voice uses more of her alto range and makes the song sound fuller. She also said the storytelling perspective changed over time, calling the new version "warmer and more empathetic". Hannah Mylrea of NME said Swift successfully revisited the teenage feelings "with kindness and affection", and Saloni Gajjar of The A.V. Club said Swift incorporated a subtle change in delivery that elevates the song's emotional impact. Joe Coscarelli from The New York Times said the re-recorded track "can't help but sound like [a cover]" because of Swift's matured vocals and teenage lyrics. Heather Taylor-Singh of Exclaim! and Jonathan Bernstein of Rolling Stone said Swift's vocals somewhat lose the adolescent sense in the original.

=== Personnel ===
Credits adapted from Fearless (Taylor's Version) album liner notes

- Taylor Swift – lead vocals, songwriter, producer
- Liz Rose – songwriter
- Christopher Rowe – producer, recording engineer
- Max Bernstein – steel guitar
- Matt Billingslea – drums, percussion programming
- Dan Burns – percussion programming
- Caitlin Evanson – background vocals
- Derek Garten – additional engineer
- Serban Ghenea – mixer
- John Hanes – engineer
- Amos Heller – bass guitar
- Mike Meadows – acoustic guitar, banjitar, banjo, mandolin
- David Payne – recording engineer
- Lowell Reynolds – additional engineer
- Paul Sidoti – electric guitar
- Jonathan Yudkin – fiddle

=== Charts ===
2021 chart performance
Chart (2021)	Peak position
Australia (ARIA)	53
Canada (Canadian Hot 100)	44
Global 200 (Billboard)	51
Ireland (IRMA)	30
New Zealand Hot Singles (RMNZ)	5
Singapore (RIAS)	20
UK Singles (Official Charts)	52
US Billboard Hot 100	75
US Hot Country Songs (Billboard)	16

2024 chart performance
Chart (2024)	Peak position
Australia (ARIA)	37

=== Certifications ===
Certifications
Region	Certification	Certified units/sales
Australia (ARIA)	3× Platinum	210,000^{‡}
Brazil (Pro-Música Brasil)	Platinum	40,000^{‡}
New Zealand (RMNZ)	Platinum	30,000^{‡}
Poland (ZPAV)	Gold	25,000^{‡}
United Kingdom (BPI)	Platinum	600,000^{‡}
^{‡} Sales+streaming figures based on certification alone.

== See also ==
- List of number-one adult contemporary singles of 2009 (U.S.) and 2010 (U.S.)
- List of Hot Country Songs number ones of 2009
- List of highest-certified singles in Australia
