= American Ride (song) =

- 2009 single cover

Single by Toby Keith

from the album American Ride
- Released: July 28, 2009
- Genre: Country
- Length: 2:49; 3:27 (remix)
- Label: Show Dog Nashville
- Songwriters: Dave Pahanish; Joe West
- Producer: Toby Keith

Toby Keith singles chronology
"Lost You Anyway" (2009)	"American Ride" (2009)	"Cryin' for Me (Wayman's Song)" (2009)

Music video
- "American Ride" at CMT.com

"American Ride" is a song written by Joe West and Dave Pahanish and recorded by American country music artist Toby Keith. It was released in July 2009 as the first single and title track from Keith's 2009 album of the same name, and was the only track from the album that he did not have a hand in writing. The song became Keith's 19th number one hit on the US Billboard Hot Country Songs chart for the week of October 10, 2009. A remix of this song was featured on his fourth greatest hits album, Greatest Hits: The Show Dog Years in 2019.

== Content ==
The song is an up-tempo song in which the narrator lists off various politically oriented issues in the United States, such as illegal immigration ("Tidal Wave comin' 'cross the Mexican border"), political correctness ("Don't get busted singin' Christmas carols"), lawsuits ("Spill a cup of coffee, make a million dollars"), rising gasoline prices ("Why buy a gallon when it's cheaper by the barrel?"), climate change ("Winter gettin' colder, summer gettin' warmer"), and the decreased importance of religion ("Plasma gettin' bigger, Jesus gettin' smaller"), but states that he is still proud to live in America ("That's us, that's right / Gotta love this American ride"). It also references Donald Trump's outlash at the 1996 Miss Universe winner, Alicia Machado's slight weight gain.

Dave Pahanish and Joe West, the writers, had originally titled the song "American Life" when they submitted the demo to Keith. Pahanish and West talked about "the funny, but irritating, things in life that really tick people off." Keith also had the song on his iPod a year before recording it.

== Critical reception ==
The song has received mixed reviews from music critics. Dan Milliken of Country Universe said that the intro sounded like a "hamster dance" version of Reba McEntire's "Strange", and that the rest of it sounded like a car commercial. He also said that he could not tell if the song's lyric was an attempt to be serious or satirical: "I can’t say I don’t find it all amusing on some strange level. There seems to have been a serious attempt to make social commentary here, and it was pretty hit-or-miss, or maybe more of one than the other, depending on your perspective." He ultimately declined to give the song a letter grade. Jed Gottlieb of The Boston Globe said that the song "lets him make fun of his status as a political punching bag while mocking both the right and left." Stephen Thomas Erlewine of Allmusic viewed it positively, saying that it was not "jingoistic" and that it "casts a cynical eye[…]not celebrating down-home values but wondering where we're all headed[.]"

== Music video ==
The song's music video debuted on the television network CMT on August 13, 2009. Directed by Michael Salomon, The video is animated in the style of the JibJab online cartoons. The song's music video consisted of Keith and three men riding motorcycles while passing multiple scenes related to the song's lyrics. Scenes include evangelist Pat Robertson riding on former United States President George W. Bush's back, and Wall Street, where then-United States President Barack Obama is being hoisted in the air by bankers. The last scene of the video shows Keith falling into the boat full of American flags, and then, we see the foreign dictators disguised as pirates on larger ships, where the cannons started to shoot him. Keith passes through a set of television monitors, which all have political talk shows on, and the hosts are fighting each other. The video ends with the sign reading "Thank you for visiting America... y'all come back now". Keith told Country Weekly magazine that he was criticized by "blogger terrorists" the day that the video was released, adding, "But they really can't get a fire started in the direction they want to go because the video makes fun of everybody."

The song's reference to Liebeck v. McDonald's Restaurants led to a clip of the music video being used in an episode of Adam Ruins Everything which deals with the case.

== Chart performance ==
"American Ride" debuted at number 38 on the U.S. Billboard Hot Country Songs chart for the week of July 18, 2009, and reached number one the week of October 10, becoming Keith's 19th number one hit. On the Billboard Hot 100, it debuted at number 54 the week of August 15. Ten weeks later, it peaked at number 35 the week of October 24, and stayed on the chart for sixteen weeks. In Sweden, the track debuted and peaked at number 60 on the Swedish Singles Chart for the week of November 26.

Chart (2009)	Peak position
Canada Country (Billboard)	37
Swedish Singles Chart	60
US Hot Country Songs (Billboard)	1
US Billboard Hot 100	35

=== Year-end charts ===
Annual chart rankings
Chart (2009)	Position
US Country Songs (Billboard)	22
US Radio Songs (Billboard)	95

== Certifications ==
Region	Certification	Certified units/sales
United States (RIAA)	Platinum	1,000,000^{‡}
^{‡} Sales+streaming figures based on certification alone.
