= Kiss a Girl =

Single by Keith Urban

from the album Defying Gravity
- Released: 10 March 2009
- Recorded: 2009
- Genre: Country rock
- Length: 3:46
- Label: Capitol Nashville
- Songwriters: Keith Urban; Monty Powell
- Producers: Dann Huff; Keith Urban

Keith Urban singles chronology
"Sweet Thing" (2008)	"Kiss a Girl" (2009)	"Only You Can Love Me This Way" (2009)

"Kiss a Girl" is a song recorded by Australian country music singer Keith Urban. It was released in March 2009 as the second single from his 2009 album Defying Gravity. The song reached number three on the US Billboard Hot Country Songs chart. The song also became his highest peak on the Billboard Hot 100 at number 16, and his only top 20 on that chart to date. Urban co-wrote this song with Monty Powell.

Along with eventual Idol winner Kris Allen, Urban performed the song live during the finale of the eighth season of American Idol on 20 May 2009.

== Content ==
"Kiss a Girl" is a moderate up-tempo song in which the male narrator expresses a desire to fall in love with a female.

== Critical reception ==
Thom Jurek of AllMusic cited "Kiss a Girl" as a standout track on the album, calling it a "tight little rocker". He said that it and "Sweet Thing", the album's first single, "are 21st century equivalents of rock & roll love songs." Jonathan Keefe of Slant Magazine described the song unfavorably, saying that it was a retread of his previous single "Sweet Thing", which itself was described as a retread of Urban's earlier material.

== Music videos ==
Both a finalised and a promotional music video for "Kiss a Girl" are available for view on CMT and were both directed by Chris Hicky.

=== Promotional video ===
The promotional video for the song premiered in April 2009 on CMT's website. It consists of Urban and his band performing in front of a green screen. Some of these scenes were later edited and included the TV video.

=== Official video ===
The official video was found on iTunes on 25 May 2009. It consists of Urban and the band performing in an animated city. Also included is two people who eventually find each other and fall in love. At the end, the ferris wheel they ride displays "KISS" on each car, a reference to the song's title.

== Track listing ==
CD single
No.	Title	Writer(s)	Length
1.	"Kiss a Girl" (single mix)	Keith Urban; Monty Powell	3:46
2.	"Kiss a Girl" (album mix)	Urban; Powell	3:46
3.	"Only You Can Love Me This Way"	Steve McEwan; John Reid	4:02
Total length:			11:34

== Chart performance ==
=== Weekly charts ===
Weekly chart performance
Chart (2009–2010)	Peak position
Australia (ARIA)	87
Canada Hot 100 (Billboard)	34
Canada AC (Billboard)	37
Canada Country (Billboard)	1
US Billboard Hot 100	16
US Adult Contemporary (Billboard)	11
US Adult Pop Airplay (Billboard)	40
US Hot Country Songs (Billboard)	3

=== Year-end charts ===
Annual chart rankings
Chart (2009)	Position
US Adult Contemporary (Billboard)	35
US Country Songs (Billboard)	25
US Radio Songs (Billboard)	91
Chart (2010)	Position
US Adult Contemporary (Billboard)	33

== Certifications and sales ==
Region	Certification	Certified units/sales
Australia (ARIA)	Platinum	70,000^{‡}
United States (RIAA)	Platinum	1,000,000^{^}
^{^} Shipments figures based on certification alone.^{‡} Sales+streaming figures based on certification alone.

== Release history ==
Country	Date	Format	Label	Ref.
Worldwide	10 March 2009	Digital download	Capitol Nashville	
United States	16 March 2009	Country radio	Capitol	
Australia	14 July 2009	CD single	Capitol	
