= Only You Can Love Me This Way =

Single by Keith Urban

from the album Defying Gravity
- Released: 29 June 2009
- Recorded: 2009
- Genre: Country
- Length: 4:07 (album version)
- Label: Capitol Nashville
- Songwriters: Steve McEwan; John Reid
- Producers: Dann Huff; Keith Urban

Keith Urban singles chronology
"Kiss a Girl" (2009)	"Only You Can Love Me This Way" (2009)	"'Til Summer Comes Around" (2009)

"Only You Can Love Me This Way" is a song written by Steve McEwan and John Reid and recorded by Australian country music singer Keith Urban. It was released in June 2009 as the third single from Urban's 2009 album Defying Gravity. The song became his eleventh number one hit on the U.S. Billboard Hot Country Songs chart in October 2009.

== Writing and inspiration ==
Steve McEwan and John Reid penned the song together in a studio at a songwriting camp in Nashville where they had just met for the first time. In an interview with HitQuarters McEwan said the demo of the song that was successfully pitched to Urban featured McEwan singing backed by an acoustic guitar and a "tiny drum machine". Reid had originally sung on the demo but it was later felt it would stand a better chance of being accepted by Urban if, rather than Reid's "sweet pop voice", it was sung in McEwan's deeper "more American" vocal.

== Content ==
"Only You Can Love Me This Way" is a mid-tempo ballad in which the male narrator states that he and his lover were meant for each other.

According to the Broadcast Music Incorporated (BMI) database, Rascal Flatts has also recorded the song.

== Critical reception ==
The song has received favorable reviews from music critics. Jonathan Keefe of Slant Magazine said that the song "recall[s] the drippiness of early-'90s Richard Marx and Bryan Adams". Tara Seetharam of Country Universe gave the song a B+ grade. Her review makes note of the "stripped-down" production and adds, "It’s a testament to Urban’s artistry that he’s able to breathe life and passion into such nondescript lyrics. Michael Menachem of Billboard gave the song a favorable review, calling it "an affectionate ballad that could easily be a wedding song[…]Urban's genteel inflections are enhanced by light production and soft guitar strums." Bobby Peacock of Roughstock, despite saying that it was "below the standards" of other ballads in Urban's career, called it a "welcome change" after the up-tempos "Sweet Thing" and "Kiss a Girl." This review also mentioned Urban's "warm, passionate tone" and the "stripped-down" production.

== Music video ==
Directed by Chris Hicky, the video was shot at the Wells Fargo Arena in Des Moines, Iowa in late June 2009. It premiered in early August of that year. It starts with the sound of an audience cheering, while Urban walks on stage. He then performs to an empty theatre with an acoustic guitar. Later, he performs to various fans. The video ends with the sound and visual of him being applauded, and walking away.

== Chart performance ==
"Only You Can Love Me This Way" charted on the U.S. Billboard Hot 100 and Canadian Hot 100 on the chart week of 11 April 2009, debuting at No. 84 and No. 72 respectively. Upon its release to country radio in June, the song debuted at No. 52 on the U.S. Billboard Hot Country Songs chart, before climbing to No. 30 a week later, and re-entered both the U.S. and Canadian Hot 100 soon afterward.

Chart (2009)	Peak position
Canada Country (Billboard)	1
Canada Hot 100 (Billboard)	49
US Billboard Hot 100	34
US Hot Country Songs (Billboard)	1

=== Year-end charts ===
Chart (2009)	Position
US Country Songs (Billboard)	19

== Certifications ==
Region	Certification	Certified units/sales
Australia (ARIA)	Gold	35,000^{‡}
United States (RIAA)	Platinum	1,000,000^{‡}
^{‡} Sales+streaming figures based on certification alone.
