= Sweet Thing (Keith Urban song) =

2008 song by Keith Urban

Single by Keith Urban

from the album Defying Gravity
- Released: 3 November 2008
- Recorded: 2008
- Studio: Castle Recording Studios (Franklin, Tennessee)
- Genre: Country
- Length: 3:48
- Label: Capitol Nashville
- Songwriters: Monty Powell; Keith Urban
- Producers: Dann Huff; Keith Urban

Keith Urban singles chronology
"Start a Band" (2008)	"Sweet Thing" (2008)	"Kiss a Girl" (2009)

"Sweet Thing" is a song co-written and recorded by Australian and American country music artist Keith Urban. It was released in November 2008 as the first single from his 2009 album Defying Gravity. The song became Urban's tenth number one single on the US Billboard Hot Country Songs chart. It also peaked at number 30 on the Billboard Hot 100. This song also went on to win his third Grammy Award for Best Male Country Vocal Performance in 2010. Urban wrote this song with Monty Powell.

== Content ==
"Sweet Thing" is an up-tempo country pop song in which the male narrator talks about his first dates with his lover together, including meeting "in the backyard under the cottonwood tree" and "kissin' on the porch swing", as well as the lover exiting the house through her bedroom window "while the world's sleeping." The lyrics were inspired by Urban's relationship with his Ford Mustang, which is seen in this song's music video. Urban recorded the song at The Castle Recording Studios in Franklin, Tennessee.

== Music video ==
The official music video for "Sweet Thing" was directed by Trey Fanjoy and premiered on 19 January 2009. The video and was shot inside a barn in Spring Hill, Tennessee and many scenes were also shot in Lebanon, Tennessee including the diner and the '70s house. They originally were to shoot the video outside, but it was too rainy. So instead, they were forced to use the farm. The acting scenes were also shot in Spring Hill. The Ford Mustang seen in the barn is Urban's own.

== In popular culture ==
This song appears in the video game Tap Tap Revenge 2.

== Chart performance ==
"Sweet Thing debuted at number 30 on the US Billboard Hot Country Songs chart, becoming Urban's nineteenth Top 40 country hit. For the chart week of 14 March 2009, the song became his tenth number one single. In addition, the song also reached number 30 on the Billboard Hot 100. This was Urban's first Top 40 hit on the Pop chart since "Once in a Lifetime" and his first Top 30 on there since "You'll Think of Me".

=== Weekly charts ===
Weekly chart performance
Chart (2008–2009)	Peak position
Australia (ARIA)	96
Canada Country (Billboard)	1
Canada Hot 100 (Billboard)	45
US Billboard Hot 100	30
US Hot Country Songs (Billboard)	1

=== Year-end charts ===
Year-end chart performance
Chart (2009)	Position
US Country Songs (Billboard)	9
US Radio Songs (Billboard)	83

== Certifications ==
Region	Certification	Certified units/sales
United States (RIAA)	Platinum	1,000,000^{‡}
^{‡} Sales+streaming figures based on certification alone.
