= Rascal Flatts discography =

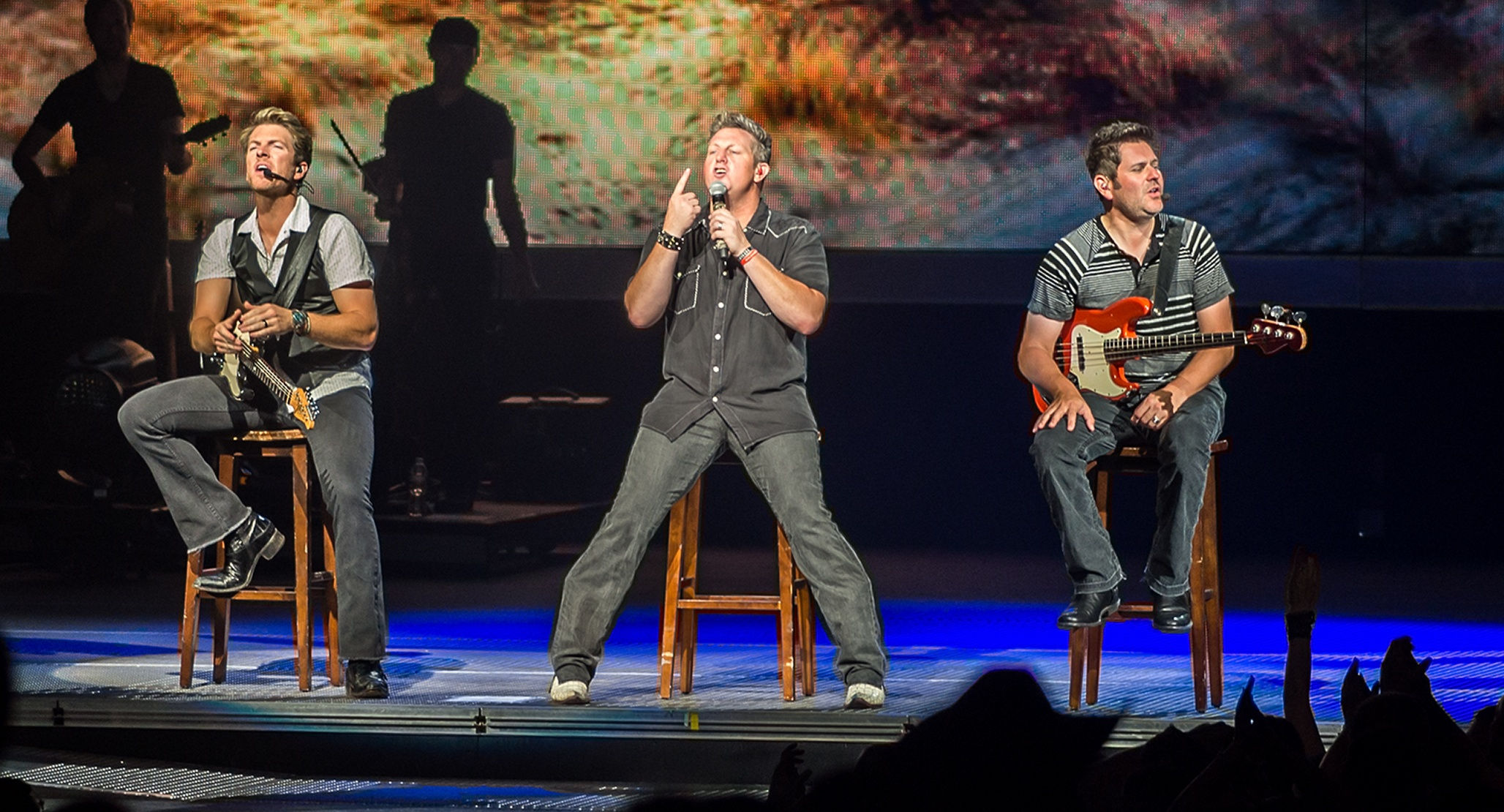
- Rascal Flatts in 2013
- Studio albums: 11
- Extended plays: 3
- Live albums: 2
- Compilation albums: 5
- Singles: 40
- Music videos: 39
- Other charted songs: 22

Rascal Flatts are an American country music group founded in 1999 by Gary LeVox, Jay DeMarcus, and Joe Don Rooney. Signed to Lyric Street Records until 2010, the band released ten studio albums plus a greatest hits package, the first six on the Lyric Street Records label, the last four on Big Machine Records. Their highest-certified albums are Feels Like Today and Me and My Gang, which are both certified 5× Platinum. Except for their 2000 self-titled debut and 2017's Back to Us, all of the group's albums have reached No. 1 on the Top Country Albums chart.

The trio has released 40 singles, 14 of which reached No. 1 on the US Billboard Hot Country Songs charts and five of which have reached No. 1 on the Canadian country charts. Their rendition of "Bless the Broken Road" is their longest-lasting number one single at five weeks, while their cover of "What Hurts the Most" is also a number one on the Hot Adult Contemporary Tracks charts. The latter song is the group's highest-peaking entry on the Billboard Hot 100, reaching number 6. Their second-highest Hot 100 peak is the number 7 "Life Is a Highway", which the group recorded for the soundtrack to the Pixar animated movie Cars; it reached No. 18 on the country charts based on unsolicited airplay.

In July 2010, the group signed with Big Machine Records, and released a new album, Nothing Like This, on November 16, 2010. Their eighth studio album, Changed, was released in April 2012. Their ninth studio album, Rewind, was released on May 13, 2014. Their tenth studio album, Back to Us, was released on May 19, 2017.

Rascal Flatts has sold over 27 million albums and 33.7 million digital downloads since their debut in 2000.

== Studio albums ==
=== 2000s ===
Title	Album details	Peak chart positions						Certifications (sales threshold)	Sales
Title	Album details	US	US Country	CAN	IRE	JPN	UK	Certifications (sales threshold)	Sales
Rascal Flatts (Note: Rascal Flatts also reached number 14 on the Canadian RPM Country Albums chart.)	Release date: June 6, 2000; Label: Lyric Street Records; Formats: CD, cassette	43	3	—	—	—	—	RIAA: 2× Platinum	US: 2,303,000
Melt	Release date: October 29, 2002; Label: Lyric Street Records; Formats: CD, cassette	5	1	—	—	—	—	MC: Gold; RIAA: 3× Platinum	US: 3,073,000
Feels Like Today	Release date: September 28, 2004; Label: Lyric Street Records; Formats: CD, music download	1	1	—	—	—	—	MC: Platinum; RIAA: 5× Platinum	US: 5,274,000
Me and My Gang	Release date: April 4, 2006; Label: Lyric Street Records; Formats: CD, music download	1	1	4	—	37	—	MC: Platinum; RIAA: 4× Platinum	US: 4,918,000
Still Feels Good	Release date: September 25, 2007; Label: Lyric Street Records; Formats: CD, music download	1	1	3	77	117	64	RIAA: 2× Platinum	US: 2,192,000
Unstoppable	Release date: April 7, 2009; Label: Lyric Street Records; Formats: CD, music download	1	1	7	—	—	—	RIAA: Platinum	US: 1,230,000
"—" denotes releases that did not chart

=== 2010s–2020s ===
Title	Album details	Peak chart positions								Certifications (sales threshold)	Sales
Title	Album details	US	US Country	CAN	AUS	AUS Country	SWE	UK Country	UK	Certifications (sales threshold)	Sales
Nothing Like This	Release date: November 16, 2010; Label: Big Machine Records; Formats: CD, music download	6	1	14	—	—	—	—	—	MC: Gold; RIAA: Platinum	US: 1,100,000
Changed	Release date: April 3, 2012; Label: Big Machine Records; Formats: CD, music download	3	1	10	51	2	14	1	87	RIAA: Gold	US: 502,000
Rewind	Release date: May 13, 2014; Label: Big Machine Records; Formats: CD, music download	5	1	7	17	—	—	2	—		US: 257,000
Back to Us	Release date: May 19, 2017; Label: Big Machine Records; Formats: CD, music download	11	2	19	24	1	—	3	—		US: 68,600
Life Is a Highway: Refueled Duets	Release date: June 6, 2025; Label: Big Machine Records; Formats: CD, music download	114	26	—	—	—	—	—	—		
"—" denotes releases that did not chart

== Christmas albums ==
Title	Album details	Peak chart positions		
Title	Album details	US	US Country	US Holiday
The Greatest Gift of All	Release date: October 21, 2016; Label: Big Machine Records; Formats: CD, Music download	60	7	6

== Compilation albums ==
Title	Album details	Peak chart positions		
Title	Album details	US	US Country	CAN
Best of Ballads	Release date: October 15, 2007; Label: Cut; Formats: Music download	—	—	—
Greatest Hits Volume 1	Release date: October 28, 2008; Label: Lyric Street Records; Formats: CD, music download	6	2	11
The Vault	Release date: September 8, 2009; Label: Lyric Street Records; Formats: Music download	—	—	—
14 Love Songs for the 14th	Release date: February 9, 2010; Label: Lyric Street Records; Formats: Music download	—	41	—
Twenty Years of Rascal Flatts: The Greatest Hits	Release date: October 2, 2020; Label: Big Machine Records/Lyric Street Records; Formats: CD, LP, music download	87	9	—
"—" denotes releases that did not chart

== Live albums ==
Title	Album details	Peak chart positions	
Title	Album details	US	US Country
Rascal Flatts Live	Release date: September 16, 2003; Label: Lyric Street Records; Formats: CD	—	—
The Best of Rascal Flatts Live	Release date: November 8, 2011; Label: Hollywood Records; Formats: CD, music download	167	32
"—" denotes releases that did not chart

== Extended plays ==
Title	Album details	Peak positions
Title	Album details	US Country
The Hot Mixes	Release date: June 10, 2008; Label: Lyric Street Records; Format: Music download	—
Unwrapped	Release date: November 23, 2009; Label: Lyric Street Records; Formats: Music download	44
Rewind	Release date: March 4, 2014; Label: Big Machine Records; Formats: CD	40
How They Remember You	Release date: July 31, 2020; Label: Big Machine Records; Formats: Music download	35
Love Songs (2010-2019)	Release date: February 11, 2022; Label: Big Machine Records; Formats: Music download	—
Hot in Here: Summer Songs (2010-2019)	Release date: May 27, 2022; Label: Big Machine Records; Formats: Music download	—

== Singles ==
=== 2000s ===
Year	Title	Peak chart positions										Certifications (sales threshold)	Album
Year	Title	US	US Country	US AC	US Adult	CAN	CAN Country	IRE	JPN	SWE	UK	Certifications (sales threshold)	Album
2000	"Prayin' for Daylight"	38	3	—	—	—	4	—	—	—	—	RIAA: Gold	Rascal Flatts
2000	"This Everyday Love"	56	9	—	—	—	48 (Note: "This Everyday Love" had not yet peaked when RPM ceased publication in November 2000.)	—	—	—	—		Rascal Flatts
2001	"While You Loved Me"	60	7	—	—	—	x	—	—	—	—		Rascal Flatts
2001	"I'm Movin' On"	41	4	—	—	—	x	—	—	—	—		Rascal Flatts
2002	"These Days"	23	1	—	—	—	x	—	—	—	—		Melt
2003	"Love You Out Loud"	30	3	—	—	—	x	—	—	—	—		Melt
2003	"I Melt"	34	2	—	—	—	x	—	—	—	—		Melt
2003	"Mayberry"	21	1	—	—	—	2	—	—	—	—		Melt
2004	"Feels Like Today"	56	9	—	—	—	10	—	—	—	—		Feels Like Today
2004	"Bless the Broken Road"	29	1	20	—	—	1	35	—	58	41	RIAA: 7× Platinum; BPI: Silver; RMNZ: Platinum	Feels Like Today
2005	"Fast Cars and Freedom"	38	1	—	—	—	2	—	—	—	—	RIAA: Gold	Feels Like Today
2005	"Skin (Sarabeth)" (Note: "Skin (Sarabeth)" had originally charted earlier in 2005 as "Skin" prior to the single's release. The song was originally a hidden track, but was officially added to later releases of Feels Like Today.)	42	2	—	—	—	2	—	—	—	—	RIAA: Gold	Feels Like Today
2006	"What Hurts the Most"	6	1	1	9	45	1	—	—	—	103	RIAA: 5× Platinum; RMNZ: Gold	Me and My Gang
2006	"Me and My Gang"	50	6	—	—	—	15	—	—	—	—		Me and My Gang
2006	"Life Is a Highway" (Note: "Life Is a Highway" is also included on later pressings of Me and My Gang.)	7	18	—	—	—	10	—	—	— (Note: "Life Is a Highway" did not enter the Swedish Singles Chart, but peaked at number 16 on the Swedish Heatseeker chart.)	—	RIAA: 8× Platinum; BPI: 2× Platinum; IFPI DEN: 2× Platinum; RMNZ: 4× Platinum	Cars: Original Motion Picture Soundtrack
2006	"My Wish"	28	1	13	—	—	1	—	—	—	—	RIAA: Platinum	Me and My Gang
2007	"Stand"	46	1	—	—	54	3	—	—	—	—		Me and My Gang
2007	"Take Me There"	19	1	—	—	49	3	—	—	—	—		Still Feels Good
2007	"Winner at a Losing Game"	52	2	—	—	57	2	—	—	—	—		Still Feels Good
2008	"Every Day"	45	2	—	—	65	5	—	—	—	—		Still Feels Good
2008	"Bob That Head"	— (Note: "Bob That Head", "Why", and "Riot" did not enter the Billboard Hot 100, but peaked at number 2 on the Bubbling Under Hot 100 Singles extension chart.)	15	—	—	—	26	—	—	—	—		Still Feels Good
2008	"Here"	50	1	—	—	80	4	—	—	—	—		Still Feels Good
2009	"Here Comes Goodbye"	11	1	13	—	48	4	—	33	—	—		Unstoppable
2009	"Summer Nights"	37	2	—	—	56	1	—	—	—	—		Unstoppable
2009	"Why"	—	18	—	—	—	21	—	—	—	—		Unstoppable
"—" denotes releases that did not chart "x" denotes that no relevant chart existed at the time

=== 2010s–2020s ===
Year	Title	Peak chart positions									Certifications (sales threshold)	Album
Year	Title	US	US Country	US Country Airplay	US AC	US Christ	US Christ AC	AUS	CAN	CAN Country	Certifications (sales threshold)	Album
2010	"Unstoppable"	52	7		—	—	—	—	83	22		Unstoppable
2010	"Why Wait"	48	1		—	—	—	—	60	2		Nothing Like This
2011	"I Won't Let Go"	31	2		—	—	—	68	39	1	RIAA: 2× Platinum	Nothing Like This
2011	"Easy" (featuring Natasha Bedingfield)	43	3		20	—	—	—	—	25	RIAA: Platinum	Nothing Like This
2012	"Banjo"	51	1		—	—	—	—	57	1	RIAA: Gold	Changed
2012	"Come Wake Me Up"	52	8	4	—	—	—	—	99	35	RIAA: Platinum	Changed
2012	"Changed"	73	25	20	—	21	19	—	54	43	RIAA: Gold	Changed
2014	"Rewind"	38	4	3	—	—	—	—	41	6	RIAA: Platinum	Rewind
2014	"Payback"	— (Note: "Payback" did not enter the Billboard Hot 100, but peaked at number 11 on the Bubbling Under Hot 100 Singles extension chart.)	24	21	—	—	—	—	—	36		Rewind
2014	"Riot"	—	27	20	—	—	—	—	—	—		Rewind
2015	"I Like the Sound of That"	52	8	1	—	—	—	—	71	2	RIAA: 2× Platinum	Rewind
2017	"Yours If You Want It"	71	13	1	—	—	—	—	—	7	RIAA: Platinum	Back to Us
2017	"Back to Us"	—	48	46	—	—	—	—	—	41		Back to Us
2018	"Back to Life"	— (Note: "Back to Life" did not enter the Billboard Hot 100, but peaked at number 20 on the Bubbling Under Hot 100 Singles extension chart.)	28	17	—	—	—	—	—	40	RIAA: Gold	Non-album single
2020	"How They Remember You"	89	18	4	—	—	—	—	—	33		How They Remember You
2025	"I Dare You" (with Jonas Brothers)	— (Note: "I Dare You" did not enter the Billboard Hot 100, but peaked at number 23 on the Bubbling Under Hot 100 extension chart.)	31	13	—	—	—	—	—	44		Life Is a Highway: Refueled Duets
"—" denotes releases that did not chart.

=== Promotional singles ===
Year	Title	Album
2013	"Sunrise" (Note: "Sunrise" was released as a promotional single in the UK only in 2013.)	Changed
2018	"Dancin' on My Grave"	—N/a

=== Guest singles ===
Year	Title	Peak chart positions								Certifications	Album
Year	Title	US	US Country	US Country Airplay	US Christ Airplay	CAN	CAN Country	AUS	SCO	Certifications	Album
2016	"Forever Country" (as part of Artists of Then, Now & Forever)	21	1	32	—	25	34	26	29	RIAA: Gold	Non-album single
2020	"Until Grace" (Tauren Wells with Rascal Flatts)	—	—	—	7	—	—	—	—		Citizen of Heaven
"—" denotes releases that did not chart.

== Other charted and certified songs ==
Year	Single	Peak chart positions					Certifications	Album
Year	Single	US	US Country	US AC	CAN	CAN AC	Certifications	Album
2000	"Long Slow Beautiful Dance"	—	73	—	—	—		Rascal Flatts
2005	"Skin"	—	38	—	—	—		Feels Like Today
2005	"Bless the Broken Road" (Carrie Underwood with Rascal Flatts)	—	50	—	—	—		—N/a
2005	"Oklahoma-Texas Line"	—	53	—	—	—		Feels Like Today
2005	"Here's to You"	—	48	—	—	—		Feels Like Today
2006	"Pieces"	—	57	—	—	—		Me and My Gang
2006	"Ellsworth"	—	56	—	—	—		Me and My Gang
2006	"Backwards"	—	54	—	—	—		Me and My Gang
2007	"Revolution"	—	57	—	—	—		Still Feels Good
2007	"Still Feels Good"	—	56	—	—	—		Still Feels Good
2008	"Jingle Bell Rock"	—	29	30	—	—		Greatest Hits Volume 1
2008	"White Christmas"	—	32	—	—	—		Greatest Hits Volume 1
2008	"I'll Be Home for Christmas"	—	34	—	—	—		Greatest Hits Volume 1
2009	"Forever"	53	—	—	75	—		Unstoppable
2009	"Love Who You Love"	59	59	—	—	—		Unstoppable
2009	"Things That Matter"	85	—	—	—	—		Unstoppable
2010	"Close"	—	55	—	—	—		Unstoppable
2011	"That Should Be Me" (Justin Bieber feat. Rascal Flatts)	—	—	—	—	—	RMNZ: Gold	Never Say Never: The Remixes
2012	"She's Leaving"	—	—	—	96	—		Changed
2016	"Let It Snow"	—	—	16	—	41		The Greatest Gift of All
2016	"Hark! The Herald Angels Sing"	—	—	21	—	—		The Greatest Gift of All
2016	"Joy to the World"	—	—	—	—	39		The Greatest Gift of All
2016	"Someday at Christmas"	—	—	—	—	30		The Greatest Gift of All
"—" denotes releases that did not chart

== Other appearances ==
Year	Song	Other artist(s)	Album
2000	"Walk the Llama Llama"	—N/a	The Emperor's New Groove
2000	"Twist of the Magi"	SHeDAISY	Brand New Year
2001	"God Rest Ye Merry Gentlemen"	—N/a	No Wrapping Required: A Christmas Album
2002	"The Glory of Life"	—N/a	We Were Soldiers (soundtrack)
2005	"Bless the Broken Road"	Carrie Underwood	—N/a
2006	"Bless the Broken Road"	—N/a	Grammy Nominees 2006
2006	"Life Is a Highway"	—N/a	Cars (soundtrack)
2006	"Love Will Come Back"	Chicago	Chicago XXX
2006	"Summer"	India.Arie	Testimony: Vol. 1, Life & Relationship
2006	"Red, White and Blue"	Brian McKnight	Ten
2007	"Faith in Love"	Reba McEntire	Reba: Duets
2007	"Winner at a Losing Game"	—N/a	Now That's What I Call Country
2009	"Backwards"	—N/a	Hannah Montana: The Movie (soundtrack)
2009	"Bless the Broken Road"	—N/a	Hannah Montana: The Movie (soundtrack)
2009	"Here"	—N/a	Now That's What I Call Country Volume 2
2009	"Away in a Manger"	—N/a	—N/a
2010	"Mary, Did You Know?"	—N/a	—N/a
2010	"Your Day to Get Away"	—N/a	Hershey's Pure Summer Sounds
2011	"That Should Be Me"	Justin Bieber	Never Say Never: The Remixes
2011	"You're the Best Thing That Ever Happened to Me"	Anna Wilson	Countrypolitan Duets
2011	"Love Is Everything"	Michael Bolton	Gems
2012	"Dancing on the Ceiling"	Lionel Richie	Tuskegee
2012	"Come Wake Me Up"	Jill Johnson	A Woman Can Change Her Mind
2013	"Old Flame"	Alabama	Alabama & Friends
2014	"Kickstart My Heart"	—N/a	Nashville Outlaws: A Tribute to Mötley Crüe
2015	"Let It Go"	Lucy Hale	We Love Disney

== Videography ==
=== DVDs ===
Title	Album details	Peak positions	Certifications (sales threshold)
Title	Album details	US Video	Certifications (sales threshold)
Rascal Flatts Live	Release date: September 16, 2003; Label: Lyric Street Records; Formats: CD/DVD	1	US: 2× Platinum
All Access & Uncovered: The Making of Changed and Beyond	Release date: November 19, 2012; Label: Big Machine Records; Formats: DVD	7	

=== Music videos ===
Most of Rascal Flatts' singles have also featured music videos, which have aired on the television networks CMT and GAC. "Life Is a Highway", which was not officially released to country radio, also featured a video that aired on these networks.

Four album cuts have been made into music videos: "My Worst Fear" (from Melt), "Here's to You" (from Feels Like Today), "He Ain't the Leaving Kind" (from Me and My Gang), and their cover of "I'll Be Home for Christmas" (from Greatest Hits Volume 1).

Year	Video	Director
2000	"Prayin' for Daylight"	Trey Fanjoy
2000	"This Everyday Love"	Trey Fanjoy
2001	"I'm Movin' On"	Shaun Silva
2002	"These Days"	Deaton-Flanigen Productions
2003	"Love You Out Loud" (Live)	Milton Lage
2003	"I Melt"	Deaton-Flanigen Productions
2004	"My Worst Fear"	Deaton-Flanigen Productions
2004	"Feels Like Today"	Deaton-Flanigen Productions
2004	"Bless the Broken Road" (Live)	Jon Small
2005	"Here's to You" (Live)	Jon Small
2005	"Fast Cars and Freedom" (Live)	Jon Small
2005	"Skin (Sarabeth)"	Deaton-Flanigen Productions
2006	"What Hurts the Most"	Shaun Silva
2006	"Life Is a Highway"	Shaun Silva
2006	"Me and My Gang" (Live)	Jon Small
2007	"He Ain't the Leavin' Kind"	Jon Small
2007	"Stand"	Shaun Silva
2007	"Take Me There"	Shaun Silva
2008	"Every Day"	Deaton-Flanigen Productions
2008	"Bob That Head" (Live)	Shaun Silva
2008	"I'll Be Home for Christmas"	Shaun Silva
2009	"Here Comes Goodbye"	Shaun Silva
2009	"Summer Nights"	Shaun Silva
2010	"Why"	Dan Rubottom
2010	"Unstoppable"	Shawn Robbins
2010	"Why Wait"	William Zabka
2011	"I Won't Let Go"	Deaton-Flanigen Productions
2011	"Easy" (with Natasha Bedingfield)	Peter Zavadil
2012	"Banjo"	Shaun Silva
2012	"Come Wake Me Up"	Shaun Silva
2012	"Changed" (Live)	Shaun Silva
2013	"Changed"	Carl Diebold
2014	"Rewind"	Mason Dixon
2014	"Payback"	Gary Halverson
2015	"Riot"	Brian Lazzaro
2015	"I Like the Sound of That"	Kenny Jackson/John Stephens
2017	"Yours If You Want It"	William Zabka

=== Guest appearances ===
Year	Video	Director
2011	"That Should Be Me" (with Justin Bieber)	Mark Kalbfeld/Deaton-Flanigen Productions
2016	"Forever Country" (Artists of Then, Now & Forever)	Joseph Kahn
