= Greatest Hits Volume 1 (Rascal Flatts album) =

Compilation album by Rascal Flatts
- Released: October 28, 2008
- Recorded: 1999–2008
- Genre: Country
- Length: 51:53
- Label: Lyric Street
- Producer: Various original producers

Rascal Flatts chronology
| Still Feels Good (2007) | Greatest Hits Volume 1 (2008) | Unstoppable (2009) |

Alternate covers
- Limited edition re-release cover

Professional ratings
Review scores
| Source | Rating |
|---|---|
| Allmusic | 4/5 stars |

Greatest Hits Volume 1 is the first greatest hits album released by American country music band Rascal Flatts. It was released on October 28, 2008 by Lyric Street Records. The album includes thirteen of the group's biggest hits from their first four studio albums, including their first seven number-one singles, as well as three newly recorded Christmas songs on limited edition pressings.

The album was reissued on October 6, 2009, with four new live bonus tracks, an audio interview with the band, and a foldout poster. It later received a vinyl pressing in 2019.

== Track listing ==
| No. | Title | Writer(s) | Original album | Length |
|---|---|---|---|---|
| 1. | "Prayin' for Daylight" | Steve Bogard, Rick Giles | Rascal Flatts | 3:38 |
| 2. | "I'm Movin' On" | Phillip White, D. Vincent Williams | Rascal Flatts | 3:52 |
| 3. | "These Days" | Steve Robson, Jeffrey Steele, Danny Wells | Melt | 4:16 |
| 4. | "I Melt" | Gary LeVox, Neil Thrasher, Wendell Mobley | Melt | 3:55 |
| 5. | "Mayberry" | Arlos Smith | Melt | 4:34 |
| 6. | "Feels Like Today" | Robson, Wayne Hector | Feels Like Today | 3:21 |
| 7. | "Bless the Broken Road" | Jeff Hanna, Bobby Boyd, Marcus Hummon | Feels Like Today | 3:48 |
| 8. | "Fast Cars and Freedom" | LeVox, Thrasher, Mobley | Feels Like Today | 4:23 |
| 9. | "Skin (Sarabeth)" | Doug Johnson, Joe Henry | Feels Like Today | 4:22 |
| 10. | "What Hurts the Most" | Robson, Steele | Me and My Gang | 3:34 |
| 11. | "My Wish" | Steele, Robson | Me and My Gang | 4:07 |
| 12. | "Stand" | Blair Daly, Danny Orton | Me and My Gang | 3:28 |
| 13. | "Life Is a Highway" | Tom Cochrane | Me and My Gang/Cars | 4:36 |
| Total length: | | | | 51:53 |

=== Bonus tracks ===
Bonus tracks
| No. | Title | Writer(s) | Length |
|---|---|---|---|
| 1. | "White Christmas" | Irving Berlin | 3:25 |
| 2. | "Jingle Bell Rock" | Joe Beal, Jim Boothe | 2:58 |
| 3. | "I'll Be Home for Christmas" | Walter Kent, Kim Gannon | 3:27 |
| Total length: | | | 9:50 |

Note: These bonus tracks are on a separate second CD included in a limited edition foiled package for a limited time only.

Bonus tracks
| No. | Title | Writer(s) | Length |
|---|---|---|---|
| 1. | "Take Me There" (live) | Kenny Chesney, Wendell Mobley, Neil Thrasher | 4:40 |
| 2. | "Winner at a Losing Game" (live) | Jay DeMarcus, Gary LeVox, Joe Don Rooney | 4:29 |
| 3. | "Me and My Gang" (live) | Jeffrey Steele, Jon Stone, Tony Mullins | 3:44 |
| 4. | "Summer Nights" (live) | LeVox, Brett James, busbee | 4:37 |
| Total length: | | | 17:30 |

Note: These bonus tracks are live tracks and are only available on the CD's October 2009 reissue for a limited time only. They are on a separate disc which also includes an audio interview with the band. The liner doubles as a foldout poster.

== Personnel ==
The following musicians performed on the three bonus tracks.

Rascal Flatts

- Jay DeMarcus – bass guitar, background vocals
- Gary LeVox – lead vocals
- Joe Don Rooney – lead guitar, background vocals, acoustic guitar

Additional musicians

- Keith Carlock – drums on "Jingle Bell Rock"
- Eric Darken – percussion
- Shannon Forrest – drums on "White Christmas"
- Jon Gilutin – piano

Horn section on "Jingle Bell Rock"

- Mikey Haynes, Steve Patrick, Jeff Bailey – trumpets
- Barry Green – trombone
- Sam Levine, Dennis Solee, Mark Douthit – saxophones

Violins on "White Christmas": Carl Gorodetzky, Pam Sixfin, Conni Ellisor, Alan Umstead, Mary Kathryn Vanosdale, David Angell, Cathy Umstead, Cate Myer, and Karen Winkelman

String and horn arrangements by David Campbell, strings conducted by Carl Gorodetzky. Vocal arrangement on "I'll Be Home for Christmas" by Mervyn Warren.

== Chart performance ==
Greatest Hits Volume 1 debuted at number 2 on the U.S. Top Country Albums chart and number 6 on the Billboard 200, with 89,000 copies sold in the first week. In the second week, the album sold another 39,000 copies and remained number 2 on the U.S. Top Country Albums chart but dipped from number 6 to number 10 on the Billboard 200. It sold 620,000 copies in the United States up to May 2009. The album hit the 1 million mark on February 19, 2011. As October 18, 2012, it has sold 1,266,066 copies in the United States.

=== Weekly charts ===
| Chart (2008) | Peak position |
|---|---|
| Canadian Albums (Billboard) | 11 |
| US Billboard 200 | 6 |
| US Top Country Albums (Billboard) | 2 |

=== Year-end charts ===
| Chart (2008) | Position |
|---|---|
| US Top Country Albums (Billboard) | 43 |
| Chart (2009) | Position |
| US Billboard 200 | 52 |
| US Top Country Albums (Billboard) | 11 |
| Chart (2010) | Position |
| US Top Country Albums (Billboard) | 56 |
| Chart (2011) | Position |
| US Billboard 200 | 197 |
| Chart (2017) | Position |
| US Top Country Albums (Billboard) | 67 |
| Chart (2018) | Position |
| US Top Country Albums (Billboard) | 52 |
| Chart (2019) | Position |
| US Top Country Albums (Billboard) | 38 |
| Chart (2020) | Position |
| US Top Country Albums (Billboard) | 36 |
| Chart (2022) | Position |
| US Top Country Albums (Billboard) | 39 |
