= Twenty Years of Rascal Flatts: The Greatest Hits =

Compilation album by Rascal Flatts
- Released: October 2, 2020
- Recorded: 1999–2017
- Genre: Country
- Length: 75:18
- Labels: Lyric Street, Big Machine
- Producer: Various original producers

Rascal Flatts chronology
How They Remember You (2020)	Twenty Years of Rascal Flatts: The Greatest Hits (2020)	Life Is a Highway: Refueled Duets (2025)

Twenty Years of Rascal Flatts: The Greatest Hits is the second greatest hits album by American country music group Rascal Flatts. It was released on October 2, 2020, through Big Machine Records and features twenty of the group's biggest hits, including thirteen of their number one singles.

== Track listing ==
No.	Title	Writer(s)	Original album	Length
1.	"I'm Movin' On" (2008 Remaster)	Phillip White, D. Vincent Williams	Rascal Flatts	3:52
2.	"These Days" (Radio Edit)	Steve Robson, Jeffrey Steele, Danny Wells	Melt	3:36
3.	"Bless the Broken Road"	Jeff Hanna, Bobby Boyd, Marcus Hummon	Feels Like Today	3:46
4.	"Fast Cars and Freedom"	Gary LeVox, Neil Thrasher, Wendell Mobley	Feels Like Today	4:22
5.	"What Hurts the Most"	Robson, Steele	Me and My Gang	3:34
6.	"Life Is a Highway" (2008 Remaster)	Tom Cochrane	Cars/Me and My Gang	4:36
7.	"My Wish" (Hot Mix)	Steele, Robson	Me and My Gang	3:56
8.	"Stand"	Blair Daly, Danny Orton	Me and My Gang	3:28
9.	"Take Me There" (Radio Edit)	Kenny Chesney, Thrasher, Mobley	Still Feels Good	3:59
10.	"Here Comes Goodbye"	Chris Sligh, Clint Lagerberg	Unstoppable	4:03
11.	"Why Wait"	Jimmy Yeary, Tom Shapiro, Thrasher	Nothing Like This	3:44
12.	"I Won't Let Go"	Jason Sellers, Robson	Nothing Like This	3:47
13.	"Easy" (Single Edit) (ft. Natasha Bedingfield)	Katrina Elam, Michael Mobley	Nothing Like This	3:33
14.	"Banjo" (Radio Edit 2)	Thrasher, Mobley, Tony Martin	Changed	3:28
15.	"Come Wake Me Up" (Single Edit)	Johan Fransson, Tim Larsson, Tobias Lundgren, Sean McConnell	Changed	4:05
16.	"Changed" (Radio Edit)	LeVox, Thrasher, Mobley	Changed	3:40
17.	"Rewind"	Chris DeStefano, Ashley Gorley, Eric Paslay	Rewind	3:24
18.	"Riot" (Radio Edit)	Jaron Boyer, Sara Haze	Rewind	3:31
19.	"I Like the Sound of That"	Meghan Trainor, Jesse Frasure, Shay Mooney	Rewind	3:30
20.	"Yours If You Want It"	Andrew Dorff, Jonathan Singleton	Back to Us	3:28
Total length:				75:18

== Chart performance ==
=== Weekly charts ===
Chart (2020)	Peak position
US Billboard 200	87
US Top Country Albums (Billboard)	9

=== Year-end charts ===
Chart (2021)	Position
US Top Country Albums (Billboard)	23
Chart (2023)	Position
US Top Country Albums (Billboard)	65
