= The Best of Rascal Flatts Live =

Live album by Rascal Flatts
- Released: November 8, 2011
- Genre: Country
- Length: 44:09
- Label: Hollywood

Rascal Flatts chronology
Nothing Like This (2010)	The Best of Rascal Flatts Live (2011)	Changed (2012)

Professional ratings
Review scores
Source	Rating
Allmusic	3/5 stars

The Best of Rascal Flatts Live is a live album by American country music group Rascal Flatts. It was released on November 8, 2011 via Hollywood Records. The album includes the number one singles "Bless the Broken Road," "Stand," "These Days" and "What Hurts the Most." Also included are covers of Boston's "Foreplay/Long Time" and The Edgar Winter Group's "Free Ride."

== Track listing ==
No.	Title	Writer(s)	Length
1.	"Bob That Head"	Michael Dulaney, Gary LeVox, Neil Thrasher	3:38
2.	"Bless the Broken Road"	Jeff Hanna, Bobby Boyd, Marcus Hummon	3:39
3.	"Still Feels Good"	LeVox, Thrasher, Wendell Mobley	3:30
4.	"Here's to You"	Jay DeMarcus, Thrasher, Mobley	4:26
5.	"I'm Movin' On," "Skin (Sarabeth)," "Feels Like Today" (medley)	Phillip White, D. Vincent Williams/Doug Johnson, Joe Henry/Steve Robson, Wayne Hector	4:51
6.	"Stand"	Blair Daly, Danny Orton	3:29
7.	"These Days"	Robson, Jeffrey Steele, Dan Wells	5:49
8.	"What Hurts the Most"	Robson, Steele	3:35
9.	"Life Is a Highway"	Tom Cochrane	4:18
10.	"Foreplay/Long Time," "Free Ride" (encore)	Tom Scholz, Dan Hartman	6:54
Total length:			44:09

== Chart performance ==
Chart (2011)	Peak position
US Billboard Top Country Albums	32
US Billboard 200	167
