= Me and My Gang =

Studio album by Rascal Flatts
- Released: April 4, 2006
- Recorded: 2005
- Studios: Blackbird (Nashville, Tennessee); Emerald Sound (Nashville, Tennessee); Masterfonics (Nashville, Tennessee); O'Henry Sound (Burbank, California); Ocean Way (Nashville, Tennessee); Quadrafonic Sound (Nashville, Tennessee); Sound Emporium (Nashville, Tennessee); Starstruck (Nashville, Tennessee); Sound Kitchen (Franklin, Tennessee)
- Genres: Country; country rock
- Length: 51:31
- Label: Lyric Street
- Producers: Dann Huff; Rascal Flatts

Rascal Flatts chronology
Feels Like Today (2004)	Me and My Gang (2006)	Still Feels Good (2007)

Singles from Me and My Gang
- 1. "What Hurts the Most" Released: January 9, 2006; 2. "Me and My Gang" Released: April 17, 2006; 3. "Life Is a Highway" Released: June 1, 2006; 4. "My Wish" Released: August 28, 2006; 5. "Stand" Released: January 22, 2007

Professional ratings
Review scores
Source	Rating
Allmusic	3/5 stars
Entertainment Weekly	C

Me and My Gang is the fourth studio album by the American country music group Rascal Flatts, released on April 4, 2006, as their fourth album for Lyric Street Records. The album became the highest US debut of 2006, with 721,747 units and went double platinum in the first month of release. The album spent three weeks at number one on the Billboard 200 chart. It was the best selling album (not counting High School Musical) and the best selling country album of 2006. It has sold 4.918 million copies in the United States as of the chart dated March 24, 2012 and was certified 4× Platinum. This is the group's first album to be produced by Dann Huff.

The singles released from this album included "What Hurts the Most", which peaked at number one on both the Hot Country Songs and Hot Adult Contemporary Tracks charts. This was followed by the title track (which reached a peak of number 6), and then two number one hits with "My Wish" and "Stand". Later presses of the album also included a cover of Tom Cochrane's "Life Is a Highway" (a cover previously included in the soundtrack to the 2006 Disney/Pixar film Cars) as a bonus track. This cover, though not released to country radio, charted at number 18 on the country charts, overlapping with "My Wish". A video was made for "He Ain't the Leavin' Kind" even though it was never released as a single.

== Track listing ==
No.	Title	Writer(s)	Length
1.	"Stand"	Blair Daly; Danny Orton	3:28
2.	"What Hurts the Most"	Steve Robson; Jeffrey Steele	3:34
3.	"Backwards"	Marcel; Tony Mullins	3:48
4.	"I Feel Bad"	Neil Thrasher; Wendell Mobley; Jason Sellers	3:18
5.	"My Wish"	Steele; Robson	4:08
6.	"Pieces"	Monty Powell; Jay DeMarcus; Joe Don Rooney; Gary LeVox	4:07
7.	"Yes I Do"	Wally Wilson; Jimmy Yeary	4:16
8.	"To Make Her Love Me"	Thrasher; Mobley; DeMarcus	4:08
9.	"Words I Couldn't Say"	Robson; Tammi Kidd; Gregory Becker	4:35
10.	"Me and My Gang"	Steele; Mullins; Jon Stone	3:37
11.	"Cool Thing"	Thrasher; Mobley; Rooney	3:51
12.	"Ellsworth"	Thrasher; Mobley; Michael; Dulaney	4:01
13.	"He Ain't the Leavin' Kind"	Thrasher; Dulaney	4:33
Total length:			51:31

Bonus Track
No.	Title	Writer(s)	Length
14.	"Life Is a Highway"	Tom Cochrane	4:36

Best Buy Live Bonus Track
No.	Title	Writer(s)	Length
14.	"Fast Cars and Freedom"	Gary LeVox; Neil Thrasher; Wendell Mobley	4:51

Target Live Bonus Tracks
No.	Title	Writer(s)	Length
14.	"Love You Out Loud"	Brett James; Lonnie Wilson	3:06
15.	"Mayberry"	Arlos Smith	4:22
16.	"These Days"	Steve Robson; Jeffrey Steele; Danny Wells	5:57

Walmart Exclusive Live Bonus Tracks CD
No.	Title	Writer(s)	Length
1.	"This Everyday Love"	Danny Wells; Gene Nelson	3:27
2.	"Then I Did"	Steve Robson; Jeffrey Steele	3:11
3.	"I'm Movin' On"	Philip White; D. Vincent Williams	5:40
4.	"Here's to You"	Jay DeMarcus; Wendell Mobley; Neil Thrasher	4:29
5.	"Feels Like Today"	Wayne Hector; Robson	3:23

Japan Bonus Tracks
No.	Title	Writer(s)	Length
14.	"What Hurts the Most" (Hot Mix)	Robson; Steele	3:34
15.	"Life Is a Highway"	Cochrane	4:36

== Personnel ==
As listed in liner notes.

Rascal Flatts

- Jay DeMarcus – bass guitar, backing vocals
- Gary LeVox – lead vocals
- Joe Don Rooney – lead guitars, backing vocals

Additional musicians

- Tim Akers – keyboards (1, 2, 6, 9, 12), accordion (12)
- Charlie Judge – keyboards (1, 2, 4, 6–13)
- Howard Duck – keyboards (3)
- Gordon Mote – acoustic piano (4, 5, 7, 8, 11, 12), keyboards (5)
- Tom Bukovac – rhythm guitars (1, 4–8, 10–13)
- Dann Huff – rhythm guitars (1, 2, 4–13)
- Jonathan Trebing – rhythm guitars (3)
- Jonathan Yudkin – fiddle (1, 2, 7, 10), mandolin (1, 5, 6, 9, 12), banjo (2, 5, 10)
- Darrell Scott – mandolin (9)
- Paul Franklin – steel guitar (2, 4–6, 9, 12)
- Travis Toy – steel guitar (3)
- Bruce Bouton – steel guitar (7, 11, 12)
- Russ Pahl – steel guitar (8, 13)
- Chris McHugh – drums (1, 2, 4–6, 8–10, 12, 13)
- Jim Riley – drums (3)
- Lonnie Wilson – drums (7, 11)
- Eric Darken – percussion (1, 10, 12)
- John Jeannsome – fiddle (3)

String section on "My Wish" and "Words I Couldn't Say"

- David Campbell – arrangements and conductor
- Larry Corbett, Suzie Katayama and Daniel Smith – cello
- Charlie Bisharat, Roberto Cani, Mario DeLeon, Armen Garabedian, Peter Kent, Alyssa Park, Tereza Stanislav, Josefina Vergara and John Wittenberg – violin

"To Make Her Love Me"

- Charlie Judge – arrangements and conductor
- Carole Rabinowitz – cello
- Gary Vanosdale and Kristin Wilkinson – viola
- David Davidson, Conni Ellisor, Carl Gorodetzky and Pamela Sixfin – violin

=== Production ===
- Dann Huff – producer
- Rascal Flatts – producers
- Jeff Balding – recording
- Mark Hagen – recording
- Justin Niebank – recording, mixing
- Todd Tidwell – recording, recording assistant
- Drew Bollman – recording assistant, mix assistant
- Greg Lawrence – recording assistant
- David Robinson – recording assistant
- Christopher Rowe – digital editing
- Adam Ayan – mastering at Gateway Mastering (Portland, Maine)
- Sherri Halford – art direction, design
- Greg McCarn – art direction, design
- Glenn Sweitzer – art direction, design
- Chapman Baehler – photography

== Charts ==
=== Weekly charts ===
Chart (2006)	Peak position
Canadian Albums (Billboard)	4
Japan (Oricon)	37
US Billboard 200	1
US Top Country Albums (Billboard)	1

=== Year-end charts ===
Chart (2006)	Position
US Billboard 200	4
US Top Country Albums (Billboard)	2

Chart (2007)	Position
US Billboard 200	13
US Top Country Albums (Billboard)	2

Chart (2008)	Position
US Top Country Albums (Billboard)	66

=== Singles ===
Year	Single	Peak chart positions				
Year	Single	US Country	US	US Pop	US AC	CAN
2006	"What Hurts the Most"	1	6	11	1	—
2006	"Me and My Gang"	6	50	71	—	—
2006	"Life Is a Highway"	18	7	9	—	—
2006	"My Wish"	1	28	49	13	—
2007	"Stand"	1	46	80	—	54
"—" denotes releases that did not chart

== Certifications ==
Region	Certification
Canada (Music Canada)	Platinum
United States (RIAA)	4× Platinum
