= Still Feels Good =

Studio album by Rascal Flatts
- Released: September 25, 2007
- Genre: Country pop
- Length: 54:13 (Main CD); 18:45 (Bonus CD)
- Label: Lyric Street
- Producer: Dann Huff; Rascal Flatts

Rascal Flatts chronology
Me and My Gang (2006)	Still Feels Good (2007)	Greatest Hits Volume 1 (2008)

Singles from Still Feels Good
- 1. "Take Me There" Released: July 9, 2007; 2. "Winner at a Losing Game" Released: October 22, 2007; 3. "Every Day" Released: March 3, 2008; 4. "Bob That Head" Released: June 16, 2008; 5. "Here" Released: September 2, 2008

Still Feels Good is the fifth studio album by American country music group Rascal Flatts. It was released September 25, 2007 as their fifth album for Lyric Street Records. The album sold 2,192,000 copies in the United States up to May 2009 and was certified 2× Platinum by the RIAA.

Target stores released a bonus five-track CD along with Still Feels Good which includes four songs written by the group as well as a remix of their 2006 single "My Wish".

The album produced five singles on the U.S. Billboard Hot Country Songs charts. The first single, "Take Me There", was co-written by Kenny Chesney and reached No. 1 on the country charts in late 2007. The second and third singles, "Winner at a Losing Game" and "Every Day", both peaked at No. 2. "Bob That Head", the album's fourth single, made the Top 20 at No. 15. The fifth and final single, "Here", also reached No. 1.

== Track listing ==
No.	Title	Writer(s)	Length
1.	"Take Me There"	Kenny Chesney, Wendell Mobley, Neil Thrasher	4:26
2.	"Here"	Steve Robson, Jeffrey Steele	3:55
3.	"Bob That Head"	Michael Dulaney, Gary LeVox, Thrasher	4:02
4.	"Help Me Remember"	Ed Hill, Luke Laird, Hillary Lindsey	4:12
5.	"Still Feels Good"	LeVox, Thrasher, Mobley	3:55
6.	"Winner at a Losing Game"	LeVox, Jay DeMarcus, Joe Don Rooney	4:48
7.	"No Reins"	DeMarcus, Thrasher, Mobley	3:21
8.	"Every Day"	Alissa Moreno, Steele	4:15
9.	"Secret Smile"	Don Mescall, Robson	3:49
10.	"Better Now"	Gregory Becker, Darrell Brown, busbee	3:08
11.	"She Goes All the Way" (featuring Jamie Foxx)	DeMarcus, LeVox, Rooney, Monty Powell	4:00
12.	"How Strong Are You Now"	Mobley, Thrasher, Tony Martin	3:51
13.	"It's Not Supposed to Go Like That"	Bobby Pinson, Jimmy Yeary	3:59
Total length:			54:13

Japan bonus tracks
No.	Title	Writer(s)	Length
14.	"The Way"	DeMarcus, LeVox, Rooney, Cledus T. Judd	3:24
15.	"Revolution"	John Lennon, Paul McCartney	3:30

Target bonus disc
No.	Title	Writer(s)	Length
1.	"I Was Born To"	DeMarcus, LeVox, Rooney, Powell	3:39
2.	"The Way"	DeMarcus, LeVox, Rooney, Cledus T. Judd	3:24
3.	"Lonesome Road"	DeMarcus, LeVox, Rooney	3:08
4.	"I Can Almost"	Roger Riley	4:37
5.	"My Wish" (the hot mix)	Robson, Steele	3:58

Best Buy bonus disc
No.	Title	Length
1.	"1 Hour Interview with Cledus T. Judd"	60:00

== Personnel ==
As listed in liner notes.

Rascal Flatts

- Jay DeMarcus – bass guitar, backing vocals, acoustic piano on "Better Now"
- Gary LeVox – lead vocals
- Joe Don Rooney – electric guitar, acoustic guitar, backing vocals

Additional musicians

- Tony Harrell – keyboards
- Charlie Judge – acoustic piano, keyboards, synthesizers, synth strings, organ, programming, lap steel guitar, drum loops, percussion
- Gordon Mote – acoustic piano, keyboards
- Tom Bukovac – electric guitar
- Dann Huff – electric guitar, acoustic guitar, 12-string guitar, mandolin, banjo, bouzouki
- Bruce Bouton – steel guitar
- Dan Dugmore – steel guitar
- Paul Franklin – steel guitar
- Jonathan Yudkin – fiddle, mandolin, banjo
- Chris McHugh – drums
- Eric Darken – percussion
- Jamie Foxx – lead vocals (11)

String section on "Every Day"

- String arrangement written and conducted by David Campbell
- Larry Corbett, Suzie Katayama and Timothy Landauer – cello
- Oscar Hidalgo – double bass
- Roland Kato – viola
- Charlie Bisharat, Larry Greenfield, Alan Grunfeld, Julian Hallmark, Natalie Leggett, Alyssa Park, Vladimir Poliatidi, Michele Richards, Philip Vaiman, Josefina Vergara, John Wittenberg and Ken Yerke – violin

=== Production ===
- Kirk Boyer – A&R
- Doug Howard – A&R
- Dann Huff – producer
- Rascal Flatts – producers
- Mark Hagen – recording, overdub recording
- Steve Marcantonio – recording
- Justin Niebank – recording, mixing
- Allen Sides – recording
- Drew Bollman – recording assistant, mix assistant
- John Netti – recording assistant
- Charlie Paakkari – recording assistant, digital editing
- Leslie Richter – recording assistant
- Nathan Yarborough – recording assistant
- Greg Lawrence – mix assistant
- Christopher Rowe – digital editing
- Adam Ayan – mastering at Gateway Mastering (Portland, Maine)
- Darrell Franklin – A&R coordinator
- Mike "Frog" Griffith – production coordinator
- Sherri Halford – art direction
- Ashley Heron – art direction
- Glenn Sweitzer – art direction, package design
- Chapman Baehler – photography
- John Murphy – wardrobe
- Melissa Schleicher – hair, makeup

== Critical reception ==
Professional ratings
Review scores
Source	Rating
Allmusic	3/5 stars
Billboard	favorable
Entertainment Weekly	C
People	3/4 stars
Rolling Stone	3/5 stars

Critical response was mixed for the album. Giving the album three out of four stars, People magazine said "these boys know how to give today's country-pop fans what they want." Rolling Stone said "These Buffett-style party boys know what makes them the biggest group alive: songs about trucks and songs about girls," and gave the album three out of five stars. Stephen Thomas Erlewine of Allmusic, who also gave the album a three-out-of-five rating, said "Everything on Still Feels Good sounds fine[…]but few songs stand out and grab attention".

Entertainment Weekly critic Ken Tucker gave the album a C rating, saying "this is emo-country arena rock with a (slight) twang[…]the music of Still Feels Good presents not beautiful losers but manipulative wimps." A positive review came from Ken Tucker of Billboard, who wrote that the band "takes some convincing new detours". His review highlighted "Winner at a Losing Game", "She Goes All the Way", "Bob That Head" and "It's Not Supposed to Go Like That" as sounding different from previous Rascal Flatts songs.

== Chart performance ==
=== Album ===
The album sold 547,000 copies in its first week of release, topping both the U.S. Country Album chart and the Billboard 200. It is their third consecutive album to hit number one in the U.S. After one week at number one, it fell to number two with about 168,000 copies sold. Still Feels Good sold 2,192,000 copies in the United States up to May 2009 was certified 2× Platinum by the RIAA.

==== Weekly charts ====
Chart (2007)	Peak position
Canadian Albums (Billboard)	3
Japanese Albums (Oricon)	117
US Billboard 200	1
US Top Country Albums (Billboard)	1

==== Year-end charts ====
Chart (2007)	Position
US Billboard 200	40
US Top Country Albums (Billboard)	8
Chart (2008)	Position
US Billboard 200	28
US Top Country Albums (Billboard)	5
Chart (2009)	Position
US Top Country Albums (Billboard)	68

=== Singles ===
Still Feels Good produced five singles on the US Billboard Hot Country Songs charts. The first single, "Take Me There" (which was co-written by Kenny Chesney, who had originally planned to record it himself) spent three weeks at number one. Shortly after the album's release, the bonus track "Revolution" (a cover of a Beatles song) reached number 57 based on unsolicited airplay. Following "Take Me There" was "Winner at a Losing Game", the first single of Rascal Flatts' career to be written exclusively by the group's three members. Both it and the third single, "Every Day", reached number 2. "Bob That Head", the fourth single, was also the first group's first single to miss the Top 10 after peaking at number 15. "Here" followed in September 2008 and became their ninth number one hit in January 2009.

Year	Single	Peak chart positions			
Year	Single	US Country	US	US Pop	CAN
2007	"Take Me There"	1	19	33	49
2007	"Winner at a Losing Game"	2	52	—	57
2008	"Every Day"	2	45	85	65
2008	"Bob That Head"	15	102	—	—
2008	"Here"	1	50	—	80
"—" denotes releases that did not chart

== Certifications ==
Region	Certification
United States (RIAA)	2× Platinum

== Legal case ==
In August 2008, veteran New York, New York songwriter D.L. Byron sued Rascal Flatts, their producers, and the Disney Music Group for copyright infringement, arguing that "No Reins" took from his song "Shadows of the Night", written for Pat Benatar in 1982. Byron told The New York Post that "[i]t's just too much, too strikingly similar... They'd have to have a tremendous lapse of memory not to realize what they were doing. It's my contention there's willful infringement." Lawyers for band member Joe Don Rooney have responded, "To the extent that 'No Reins' shares any similarities with the plaintiff's alleged copyrighted work, any such similarities between the two works are the result of coincidence and/or the use of common or trite ideas". New York University Law School professor and intellectual property expert Rochelle Dreyfuss has remarked that "[t]hey certainly sound alike" and compared to situation to The Chiffons' famously successful case against George Harrison.
