= Take Me There =

Take Me There may refer to:

- "Take Me There" (Blackstreet & Mýa song), 1998
- "Take Me There" (Rascal Flatts song), 2007
- Take Me There, a 2011 book edited by Tristan Taormino
- "Take Me There", a song by Westlife from the 2019 album Spectrum
