= 33rd People's Choice Awards =

Pop culture award show held in 2007

Coordinates: 34°1′24.4″N 118°16′53″W

- Date: January 9, 2007
- Location: Shrine Auditorium, Los Angeles, California
- Hosted by: Queen Latifah

Television/radio coverage
- Network: CBS
- Directed by: Bruce Gowers

The 33rd People's Choice Awards, honoring the best in popular culture for 2006, were held on January 9, 2007 at the Shrine Auditorium in Los Angeles, California. They were hosted by Queen Latifah and broadcast on CBS.

== Nominations and winners ==
The nominees for the awards were selected with the help of Knowledge Networks which used what it describes as an online-only nationally representative panel to identify a pop culture-involved sample of men and women ages 18–49. Winners were chosen online by those who registered with the awards shows official website.

=== Awards ===
Winners are listed first, in bold. Other nominees are in alphabetical order.

Favorite New TV Comedy	Favorite Song from a Movie
**The Class**; 30 Rock; 'Til Death	**Life Is a Highway by Rascal Flatts, Cars**; Crazy by Alanis Morissette, The Devil Wears Prada; Real Gone by Sheryl Crow, Cars
Favorite Movie Drama	Favorite Funny Male Star
**Pirates of the Caribbean: Dead Man's Chest**; The Da Vinci Code; X-Men: The Last Stand	**Robin Williams**; Will Ferrell; Adam Sandler
Favorite Male Action Star	Favorite Movie
**Johnny Depp**; Samuel L. Jackson; Jet Li	**Pirates of the Caribbean: Dead Man's Chest**; Cars; X-Men: The Last Stand
Favorite Male TV Star	Favorite Pop Song
**Patrick Dempsey**; Charlie Sheen; Kiefer Sutherland	**Hips Don't Lie** by Shakira; Promiscuous by Nelly Furtado; Stupid Girls by Pink
Favorite Rock Song	Favorite Female Singer
**Who Says You Can't Go Home** by Bon Jovi; Call Me When You're Sober by Evanescence; Dani California by Red Hot Chili Peppers	**Carrie Underwood**; Faith Hill; Shakira
Favorite Male Movie Star	Favorite Male Singer
**Johnny Depp**; Tom Hanks; Denzel Washington	**Kenny Chesney**; Trace Adkins; Toby Keith
Favorite TV Comedy	Favorite Funny Female Star
**Two and a Half Men**; The King of Queens; My Name Is Earl	**Ellen DeGeneres**; Julia Louis-Dreyfus; Queen Latifah
Favorite Family Movie	Favorite Female Movie Star
**Cars**; Ice Age: The Meltdown; Over the Hedge	**Jennifer Aniston**; Halle Berry; Sandra Bullock
Favorite Movie Comedy	Favorite TV Drama
**Click**; Failure to Launch; Talladega Nights: The Ballad of Ricky Bobby	**Grey's Anatomy**; CSI: Crime Scene Investigation; House
Favorite Group	Favorite Leading lady
**Nickelback**; The Black Eyed Peas; Red Hot Chili Peppers	**Cameron Diaz**; Kirsten Dunst; Scarlett Johansson
Favorite Female TV Star	Favorite Hip-Hop Song
**Eva Longoria**; Jennifer Love Hewitt; Julia Louis-Dreyfus	**Ridin'** by Chamillionaire; Grillz by Nelly; Shake That by Eminem
Favorite Animated Comedy	Favorite Leading man
**The Simpsons**; Family Guy; King of the Hill	**Vince Vaughn**; Matt Damon; Brad Pitt
Favorite Country Song	Favorite Talk show Host
**Before He Cheats** by Carrie Underwood; What Hurts the Most by Rascal Flatts; When the Stars Go Blue by Tim McGraw	**Ellen DeGeneres**; Jay Leno; Oprah Winfrey
Favorite On-Screen Match-Up	Favorite R&B Song
**Johnny Depp & Keira Knightley, Pirates of the Caribbean: Dead Man's Chest**; Jennifer Aniston & Vince Vaughn, The Break-Up; Matt Damon, Leonardo DiCaprio & Jack Nicholson, The Departed	**SexyBack** by Justin Timberlake; Ain't No Other Man by Christina Aguilera; Shake It Off by Mariah Carey
Favorite Reality Show	Favorite Female Action Star
**American Idol**; Deal or No Deal; Extreme Makeover: Home Edition	**Halle Berry**; Kate Beckinsale; Uma Thurman
Favorite New TV Drama	Favorite Remake
**Heroes**; Brothers & Sisters; Ugly Betty	**Life Is a Highway** by Rascal Flatts; Crazy by Alanis Morissette; Save the Last Dance for Me by Michael Bublé
