= Our Town (James Taylor song) =

Single by James Taylor

from the album Cars: The Soundtrack
- Released: June 6, 2006
- Recorded: 2005
- Length: 4:07
- Label: Walt Disney
- Songwriter: Randy Newman
- Producer: Randy Newman

James Taylor singles chronology
"September Grass" (2003)	"Our Town" (2006)	"It's Growing" (2008)

Audio
- "Our Town" on YouTube

"Our Town" is a song used in the 2006 Disney/Pixar animated film Cars. It was written by longtime Pixar contributor Randy Newman and recorded by James Taylor.

== Story ==
The song is a ballad that recounts the economic decline of the fictional town of Radiator Springs after the creation of Interstate 40.

== Awards and nominations ==
At the 49th Grammy Awards, the song won the Grammy Award for Best Song Written for a Motion Picture, Television or Other Visual Media. The same night, Newman's work for Cars won for Music in an Animated Feature Production at the 34th Annie Awards. The song was also nominated for Academy Award for Best Original Song.

== International version ==
As the track is a background song, not key for the understanding of the plot, "Our Town" was left untranslated in most foreign dubbings. However, it numbers a few translations in various language versions.

All official versions of "Our Town"
Language version	Performer	Title	Translation
German	OleSoul	"Unsere Stadt"	"Our Town"
English	James Taylor	"Our Town"	
Spanish (European)	Toni Cruz	"Tu ciudad"	"Your Town"
Portuguese (European)	Manuel Rebelo	"O Meu Lar"	"My Town"
