= Here (Rascal Flatts song) =

Single by Rascal Flatts

from the album Still Feels Good
- Released: September 2, 2008
- Genre: Country
- Length: 3:55
- Label: Lyric Street
- Songwriters: Steve Robson; Jeffrey Steele
- Producers: Dann Huff; Rascal Flatts

Rascal Flatts singles chronology
"Bob That Head" (2008)	"Here" (2008)	"Here Comes Goodbye" (2009)

"Here" is a song written by Jeffrey Steele and Steve Robson and recorded by American country music group Rascal Flatts. It was released in September 2008 as the fifth and final single from their fifth studio album Still Feels Good.

== Content ==
"Here" is a mid-tempo country pop ballad that describes the narrator's attempts to find "a place [he's] been looking for", which ultimately turns out to be his lover ("The place that I was trying to reach / Was you right here in front of me"). In the chorus, the narrator says that he "wouldn't change a thing" about the events that led him to her.

== Critical reception ==
Brady Vercher of Engine 145 gave the song a "thumbs down" rating. He considered it a "rehash" of the group's 2004 single "Bless the Broken Road" (which also describes the narrator's attempt to find his love). Vercher also stated "the lyrics are really fairly bland [and]…are purposefully generic so that listeners can attach meaning to the song and make it applicable to their own situation." Stephen Thomas Erlewine, in his review of Still Feels Good for Allmusic, said that it "has a surging chorus ideal for both arenas and offices", and that like most of the other tracks on the album, it "settle[s] into a soft mosaic of smooth pop that is as soothing as a warm bath."

== Chart performance ==
"Here" debuted on the Hot Country Songs chart at number 49 for the week of September 20, 2008. In its fifth week on the charts, it reached the Top 20 and made its debut on the U.S. Billboard Hot 100 at number 94. "Here" became Rascal Flatts' ninth number 1 single for the weeks of January 3, 2009 – January 10, 2009.

Chart (2008–2009)	Peak position
US Hot Country Songs (Billboard)	1
US Billboard Hot 100	50
Canada Hot 100 (Billboard)	80

=== Year-end charts ===
Chart (2009)	Position
US Country Songs (Billboard)	57
