= Winner at a Losing Game =

Single by Rascal Flatts

from the album Still Feels Good
- Released: October 22, 2007
- Recorded: 2007
- Genre: Country
- Length: 3:55 (single edit); 4:48 (album version)
- Label: Lyric Street
- Songwriters: Jay DeMarcus; Gary LeVox; Joe Don Rooney
- Producers: Dann Huff; Rascal Flatts

Rascal Flatts singles chronology
"Take Me There" (2007)	"Winner at a Losing Game" (2007)	"Every Day" (2008)

"Winner at a Losing Game" is a song written and recorded by American country music group Rascal Flatts. It was released in October 2007 as the second single from their album Still Feels Good, as well as their nineteenth chart single overall. The song peaked at number 2 on the Billboard Hot Country Songs charts in February 2008, spending four weeks at that position behind "Letter to Me" by Brad Paisley. A live recording of the song was featured on the 2009 deluxe re-issue of the trio's first hits package Greatest Hits Volume 1.

== History ==
Rascal Flatts' three members (Gary LeVox, Jay DeMarcus, and Joe Don Rooney) wrote the song on their tour bus after a show late one night. According to DeMarcus, the trio began a conversation about their musical influences, and the Eagles came to mind. Inspired by the fact that they would be performing with the Eagles at the 2007 Grammy Awards, the trio decided to write a song that was stylistically similar to the music of the band.

All three members then began to write the song that night. They came up with a verse and chorus that, according to Country Weekly, "achingly express[es] a feeling we have all experienced — loving someone who just doesn't love you the same way". The next day, DeMarcus added the hook "If love is really forever, then I'm a winner at a losing game", and the song was soon finished.

LeVox considered the song special because it is the first single to be written entirely by the band's three members.

In 2024, DeMarcus ranked the song #5 amongst his favorite songs he and the band had recorded.

== Critical reception ==
Ken Tucker of Billboard wrote that the song is "fresh, familiar and conjures '70s country rock".

== Chart performance ==
Chart (2007–2008)	Peak position
US Hot Country Songs (Billboard)	2
US Billboard Hot 100	52
Canada Hot 100 (Billboard)	57

=== Year-end charts ===
Chart (2008)	Position
US Country Songs (Billboard)	22
Canada Country (Billboard)	16
