= Melt (Rascal Flatts album) =

Studio album by Rascal Flatts
- Released: October 29, 2002
- Recorded: 2002
- Studios: Work Station (Nashville, Tennessee); Tracking Room (Nashville, Tennessee)
- Genre: Country
- Length: 40:10
- Label: Lyric Street
- Producers: Mark Bright; Rascal Flatts; Marty Williams

Rascal Flatts chronology
Rascal Flatts (2000)	Melt (2002)	Feels Like Today (2004)

Singles from Melt
- 1. "These Days" Released: June 24, 2002; 2. "Love You Out Loud" Released: January 20, 2003; 3. "I Melt" Released: July 8, 2003; 4. "Mayberry" Released: December 29, 2003

Professional ratings
Review scores
Source	Rating
Allmusic	4/5 stars
Entertainment Weekly	C+

Melt is the second studio album by American country music group Rascal Flatts. It was released on October 29, 2002, by Lyric Street Records and sold 3,073,000 copies in the United States up to May 2009. The album's first single "These Days" was the group's first Number One hit on the US Billboard Hot Country Songs charts. The follow-ups, "Love You Out Loud" and "I Melt", respectively reached number 3 and number 2, while "Mayberry" was also a Number One. A music video was also made for "My Worst Fear" in 2004 even though it was never released as a single.

== Track listing ==
No.	Title	Writer(s)	Length
1.	"These Days"	Steve Robson; Jeffrey Steele; Danny Wells	4:15
2.	"Too Good Is True"	Jay DeMarcus; Danny Orton	3:20
3.	"I Melt"	Gary LeVox; Neil Thrasher; Wendell Mobley	3:54
4.	"Mayberry"	Arlos Smith	4:33
5.	"Love You Out Loud"	Brett James; Lonnie Wilson	3:06
6.	"Dry County Girl"	Marcus Hummon; Chuck Jones	3:16
7.	"Like I Am"	Joe Don Rooney; Orton	4:06
8.	"You"	Brad Crisler; James LeBlanc	4:08
9.	"Fallin' Upside Down"	Derek George; John Tirro	2:34
10.	"Shine On"	DeMarcus; LeVox; Rooney	3:01
11.	"My Worst Fear"	Al Anderson; Anthony Smith	3:56
Total length:			40:10

== Personnel ==
Rascal Flatts

- Jay DeMarcus – bass guitar, backing vocals
- Gary LeVox – lead vocals
- Joe Don Rooney – electric guitar, backing vocals

Additional musicians

- Tim Akers – keyboards (2–4, 6, 8), accordion (4)
- Larry Beaird – acoustic guitar, banjo (4)
- J. T. Corenflos – electric guitar (7)
- Paul Franklin – steel guitar (3, 8, 9, 11)
- Dann Huff – electric guitar (1, 7)
- Jerry McPherson – electric guitar (1–8, 10, 11), bouzouki (5)
- Steve Nathan – keyboards
- Jimmy Stewart – dobro (10)
- Lonnie Wilson – drums
- Jonathan Yudkin – mandolin, fiddle, cello (6), viola (6), violin (6)

Production

- Doug Howard – A&R direction
- Derek Bason – digital editing
- Mark Bright – producer
- Fresh Design – design
- Mike "Frog" Griffith – production coordinator
- Sherri Halford – art direction
- David Johnson – photography
- Scott Kidd – recording assistant, mix assistant, digital editing
- Greg McCarn – art direction
- Rascal Flatts – producers
- Christopher Rowe – digital editing
- Glenn Sweitzer – design
- Marty Williams – producer, recording, mixing, mastering
- Debra Wingo – hair stylist, make-up

== Charts ==
=== Weekly charts ===
Chart (2002)	Peak position
US Billboard 200	5
US Top Country Albums (Billboard)	1

=== Year-end charts ===
Chart (2002)	Position
Canadian Country Albums (Nielsen SoundScan)	30
US Top Country Albums (Billboard)	29
Chart (2003)	Position
US Billboard 200	52
US Top Country Albums (Billboard)	9
Chart (2004)	Position
US Billboard 200	90
US Top Country Albums (Billboard)	16

== Certifications ==
Region	Certification
Canada (Music Canada)	Gold
United States (RIAA)	3× Platinum
