= Feels Like Today =

Studio album by Rascal Flatts
- Released: September 28, 2004
- Genre: Country
- Length: 42:56
- Label: Lyric Street
- Producers: Mark Bright; Rascal Flatts; Marty Williams

Rascal Flatts chronology
Melt (2002)	Feels Like Today (2004)	Me and My Gang (2006)

Singles from Feels Like Today
- 1. "Feels Like Today" Released: June 21, 2004; 2. "Bless the Broken Road" Released: November 1, 2004; 3. "Fast Cars and Freedom" Released: March 21, 2005; 4. "Skin (Sarabeth)" Released: August 15, 2005

Professional ratings
Review scores
Source	Rating
Allmusic	3/5 stars

Feels Like Today is the third studio album by American country music group Rascal Flatts. It was released on September 28, 2004, by Lyric Street Records. As of July 2014, the album has sold 5.274 million copies in the United States, and it has been certified 5× Multi-Platinum by the RIAA. The album produced its title track as a single along with "Bless the Broken Road", "Fast Cars and Freedom", and "Skin (Sarabeth)".

"Skin (Sarabeth)", initially a hidden track, received enough airplay to enter Top 40 on the country charts in 2005, leading to its release as a single. Upon its release to radio, "Skin (Sarabeth)" was officially added to the track list. "Here's to You" also charted from unsolicited airplay, and was made into a music video. The album was nominated for Album of the Year at the 39th Annual Country Music Association Awards in 2005, as well as at the 41st Academy of Country Music Awards in 2006.

This was the band's last album to be produced by Mark Bright.

== Track listing ==
No.	Title	Writer(s)	Length
1.	"Where You Are"	Catt Gravitt; James LeBlanc	3:53
2.	"Bless the Broken Road"	Jeff Hanna; Bobby Boyd; Marcus Hummon	3:46
3.	"Then I Did"	Steve Robson; Jeffrey Steele	3:12
4.	"Feels Like Today"	Robson; Wayne Hector	3:26
5.	"Fast Cars and Freedom"	Gary LeVox; Neil Thrasher; Wendell Mobley	4:24
6.	"When the Sand Runs Out"	LeBlanc; Brad Crisler	3:46
7.	"Here's to You"	Jay DeMarcus; Thrasher; Mobley	3:33
8.	"The Day Before You"	Matthew West	4:06
9.	"Break Away"	Joe Don Rooney; Randy Cantor; Dennis Matkosky	3:12
10.	"Holes"	Gregory Becker; John Paul White	4:18
11.	"Oklahoma-Texas Line"	DeMarcus; LeVox; Rooney	2:56
12.	"Skin (Sarabeth)" (hidden track)	Doug Johnson; Joe Henry	4:18
Total length:			42:56

== Personnel ==
Rascal Flatts

- Jay DeMarcus – bass guitar, backing vocals
- Gary LeVox – lead vocals
- Joe Don Rooney – electric guitar, backing vocals

Additional musicians

- Tim Akers – keyboards, synthesizers, accordion
- Larry Beaird – acoustic guitar
- Tom Bukovac – electric guitar
- Jerry McPherson – electric guitar
- Gordon Mote – acoustic piano, Hammond B3 organ
- Steve Nathan – acoustic piano, Hammond B3 organ
- Paul Franklin – steel guitar
- Lonnie Wilson – drums
- Jonathan Yudkin – banjo, fiddle, mandolin, octofone, strings on "Feels Like Today" and "Skin (Sarabeth)"

Production

- Chapman Baehler – photography
- Mark Bright – producer
- Doug Howard – A&R
- Tom Baker – mastering
- Gene Dries – production coordinator
- Jennifer Kemp – wardrobe
- Greg McCarn – creative director
- Bart Morris – engineer, assistant engineer, mix assistant, digital editing
- Rhonda Parman – hair stylist, make-up
- Rascal Flatts – producers
- Glenn Sweitzer – art direction, design
- Marty Williams – producer, engineer, mixing

== Chart performance ==
=== Weekly charts ===
Chart (2004)	Peak position
US Billboard 200	1
US Top Country Albums (Billboard)	1

=== Year-end charts ===
Chart (2004)	Position
US Billboard 200	145
US Top Country Albums (Billboard)	22

Chart (2005)	Position
US Billboard 200	10
US Top Country Albums (Billboard)	2
Worldwide Albums (IFPI)	29

Chart (2006)	Position
US Billboard 200	20
US Top Country Albums (Billboard)	6

=== Singles ===
Year	Single	Peak chart positions			
Year	Single	US Country	US	US Pop	US AC
2004	"Feels Like Today"	9	56	—	—
2004	"Bless the Broken Road"	1	29	40	20
2005	"Fast Cars and Freedom"	1	38	70	—
2005	"Skin (Sarabeth)"	2	42	74	—
"—" denotes releases that did not chart

== Certifications ==
Certifications for "Feels Like Today"
Region	Certification	Certified units/sales
Canada (Music Canada)	Platinum	100,000^{^}
United States (RIAA)	5× Platinum	5,274,000
^{^} Shipments figures based on certification alone.
