= Me and My Gang (song) =

Single by Rascal Flatts

from the album Me and My Gang
- Released: April 17, 2006
- Recorded: 2005
- Genre: Country pop; Country rock
- Length: 3:37
- Label: Lyric Street
- Songwriters: Jeffrey Steele; Jon Stone; Tony Mullins
- Producers: Dann Huff; Rascal Flatts

Rascal Flatts singles chronology
"What Hurts the Most" (2006)	"Me and My Gang" (2006)	"Life Is a Highway" (2006)

"Me and My Gang" is a song written by Jeffrey Steele, Jon Stone, and Tony Mullins and recorded by American country music group Rascal Flatts. It was released on April 17, 2006, as the second single and title track from the band's 2006 album of the same name. The song peaked at #6 on the U.S. Billboard Hot Country Songs chart that year.

== Content ==
"Me and My Gang" is an up-tempo accompanied by electric guitar with a talk box in the intro. In it, the male narrator talks about traveling across the country with his gang.

Tony Mullins, one of the song's writers, said that he came up with the song's main riff while working on another song. Jeffrey Steele then heard the riff and decided that it seemed to fit a title, "Me and My Gang", that he had in his mind at the time. While working on recording the song, Rascal Flatts' lead singer Gary LeVox called Mullins and asked if the original line "dude named king kong eattin' on a ding dong" in the song could be changed. This line became "Dude named Elrod, jammin' on an iPod", which Mullins says was the first line that came to him.

== Critical reception ==
Allmusic critic Stephen Thomas Erlewine, in reviewing the album, said that the song seemed like a simplification of Big & Rich's "swagger" and featured similar talk-box riffs to Bon Jovi's "Livin' on a Prayer".

== Personnel ==
From Me and My Gang liner notes.

- Tom Bukovac - guitars
- Eric Darken - percussion
- Jay DeMarcus - bass guitar
- Dann Huff - guitars
- Charlie Judge - keyboards
- Gary LeVox - lead vocals
- Chris McHugh - drums
- Joe Don Rooney - guitars
- Jonathan Yudkin - fiddle, banjo

== Charts ==
Chart (2006)	Peak position
Canada Country (Billboard)	15
US Hot Country Songs (Billboard)	6
US Billboard Hot 100	50
US Billboard Pop 100	71

=== Year-end charts ===
Chart (2006)	Position
US Country Songs (Billboard)	38

== Use in media ==
The song was used in the video game, Rock Band 4, with a lyric change in the pre-chorus (It's a brothers and a sisters kind of thing, which replaces It's a brother and a sister kind of thing)
