= My Wish =

Single by Rascal Flatts

from the album Me and My Gang
- Released: August 28, 2006
- Genre: Country; country pop
- Length: 4:08 (Album Version); 3:55 (Hot Mix)
- Label: Lyric Street
- Songwriters: Jeffrey Steele; Steve Robson
- Producers: Dann Huff; Rascal Flatts

Rascal Flatts singles chronology
"Life Is a Highway" (2006)	"My Wish" (2006)	"Stand" (2007)

"My Wish" is a song written by Jeffrey Steele and Steve Robson, and recorded by American country music group Rascal Flatts. It was released in August 2006 as the third single from their album Me and My Gang. It reached number one on the U.S. country charts in December 2006 and also peaked at number 28 on the Billboard Hot 100, making it one of their popular crossover singles. It peaked at number 13 on the Billboard Hot Adult Contemporary Tracks and at number 49 on the Billboard Pop 100. As of May 2016, the song has sold 2.927 million in the US. In August 2016, a re-recorded version of the song was released to celebrate the song's 10 year anniversary.

== Remix and re-recorded versions ==
In 2007, the song was remixed and released on the Target bonus disc of Still Feels Good, then was later released alongside a remix of "What Hurts The Most" on a two-song EP entitled, The Hot Mixes. and was on their compilation album, Twenty Years of Rascal Flatts: The Greatest Hits in 2020.

In 2016, the song was re-recorded as a "10th Anniversary" release of the song.

In 2025, the band again re-recorded the track with Carly Pearce as part of their collaborative album Life Is a Highway: Refueled Duets.

== Personnel ==
From Me and My Gang liner notes.

- Tom Bukovac - guitars
- Jay DeMarcus - bass guitar
- Paul Franklin - steel guitar
- Dann Huff - guitars
- Gary LeVox - lead vocals
- Chris McHugh - drums
- Gordon Mote - piano, keyboards
- Joe Don Rooney - guitars
- Jonathan Yudkin - fiddle, banjo

String section

- Charlie Bisharat, Roberto Cani, Mario DeLeon, Armen Garabedian, Peter Kent, Alyssa Park, Tereza Stanislav, Josefina Vergara, John Wittenberg - violins
- Suzie Katayama, Larry Corbett, Daniel Smith - cellos

Strings conducted by David Campbell.

== Charts ==
Chart (2006–2007)	Peak position
Canada Country (Billboard)	1
US Hot Country Songs (Billboard)	1
US Billboard Hot 100	28
US Billboard Pop 100	49
US Adult Contemporary (Billboard)	13

=== Year-end charts ===
Chart (2006)	Position
US Country Songs (Billboard)	50

Chart (2007)	Position
US Country Songs (Billboard)	41
US Adult Contemporary (Billboard)	29

== Certifications ==
Region	Certification	Certified units/sales
United States (RIAA)	Platinum	1,000,000^{^}
^{^} Shipments figures based on certification alone.
