= Mayberry (song) =

2003 single by Rascal Flatts

Single by Rascal Flatts

from the album Melt
- Released: December 29, 2003
- Genre: Country
- Length: 4:32
- Label: Lyric Street
- Songwriter: Arlos Smith
- Producers: Mark Bright; Rascal Flatts; Marty Williams

Rascal Flatts singles chronology
"I Melt" (2003)	"Mayberry" (2003)	"Feels Like Today" (2004)

"Mayberry" is a song written by Arlos Smith and recorded by American country music group Rascal Flatts. It was released in December 2003 as the fourth and final single from the band’s 2002 album Melt. The song became the group’s second number one hit on the U.S. Billboard Hot Country Singles & Tracks chart. It also peaked at number 21 on the U.S. Billboard Hot 100. The song was later included on the band's Greatest Hits Volume 1 (2008).

== Background ==
Gary LeVox said of the song, "The banjo really stands out on this track. It tells a lot about life in 2002, how busy you can get being caught up in the rat race. It reminds me of my childhood and it’s a really cool tune--one of our favorites."

== Content ==
The song references the easy-going life lived in the fictitious town of Mayberry, from The Andy Griffith Show. It depicts the way life used to be, before the world started changing and becoming so fast-paced. The song is set in the key of G♭ major albeit every following verse modulates to the key of A major.

== 2025 re-recording ==
Rascal Flatts re-recorded the song with Blake Shelton as part of their 2025 collaborative album Life Is a Highway: Refueled Duets.

== Chart performance ==
"Mayberry" debuted at number 56 on the U.S. Billboard Hot Country Singles & Tracks for the week of January 3, 2004. On the week of May 22, 2004, "Mayberry" became the group's second number one hit.

Chart (2003–2004)	Peak position
Canada Country (Radio & Records)	2
US Hot Country Songs (Billboard)	1
US Billboard Hot 100	21

=== Year-end charts ===
Chart (2004)	Position
US Country Songs (Billboard)	7
