= Bob That Head =

Single by Rascal Flatts

from the album Still Feels Good
- Released: June 16, 2008
- Genre: Country
- Length: 4:01 (album version); 3:45 (single version)
- Label: Lyric Street
- Songwriters: Michael Dulaney; Gary LeVox; Neil Thrasher
- Producers: Dann Huff; Rascal Flatts

Rascal Flatts singles chronology
| "Every Day" (2008) | "Bob That Head" (2008) | "Here" (2008) |

"Bob That Head" is a song written by Gary LeVox, Neil Thrasher, and Michael Dulaney and recorded by American country music group Rascal Flatts. It was released in July 2008 as the fourth single from their album Still Feels Good. With a peak of number 15 in late 2008, the song became their first single not to reach Top 10.

== Content ==
The song is an up-tempo rock-influenced song, accompanied by electric guitar and banjo, describing a male character who has saved up for expensive stereo equipment to place in his truck, so he can drive around town and "bob that head every Friday night" while playing his music loudly. The verses are largely spoken-word.

Rascal Flatts debuted the song in April 2008 at the CMT Music Awards. Before the performance, the group held a contest, asking for fans to submit videos of themselves "bobbing their heads" while singing the song's chorus. Videos were then selected from those submitted, and aired on video monitors behind the group as they performed the song at the awards show. Rascal Flatts also named its 2008 tour the Bob That Head Tour.

== Critical reception ==
Singer Billy Joe Shaver, in an interview for Engine 145, stated that the song's title reminded him of an act of fellatio. In his review of the album, Rolling Stone reviewer Rob Sheffield said of the song, "don't get the wrong idea from that title — it's a song about a truck". Ken Tucker of Billboard said that the song "is likely to become a Friday night cruising favorite".

== Music video ==
The music video for "Bob That Head" was directed by Shaun Silva, and was created from assorted clips shot by fans at two performances in 2008 during the Bob that Head tour. Fans were given "fan cams" and pulled up on stage to shoot the videos. The video made its debut on October 9, 2008, after the single had peaked and after the release of their next single, "Here".

== Chart performance ==
"Bob That Head" reached its peak position at number 15 on the Billboard Hot Country Songs charts for the week of September 13, 2008. It became the first official country single of Rascal Flatts' career to miss the Top Ten on the country charts. It is also the first single of their career not to enter the Billboard Hot 100 charts, although it peaked at number 2 on the Bubbling Under Hot 100.

| Chart (2008) | Peak position |
|---|---|
| US Hot Country Songs (Billboard) | 15 |
| US Billboard Bubbling Under Hot 100 | 2 |
