= Alissa Moreno =

American singer-songwriter

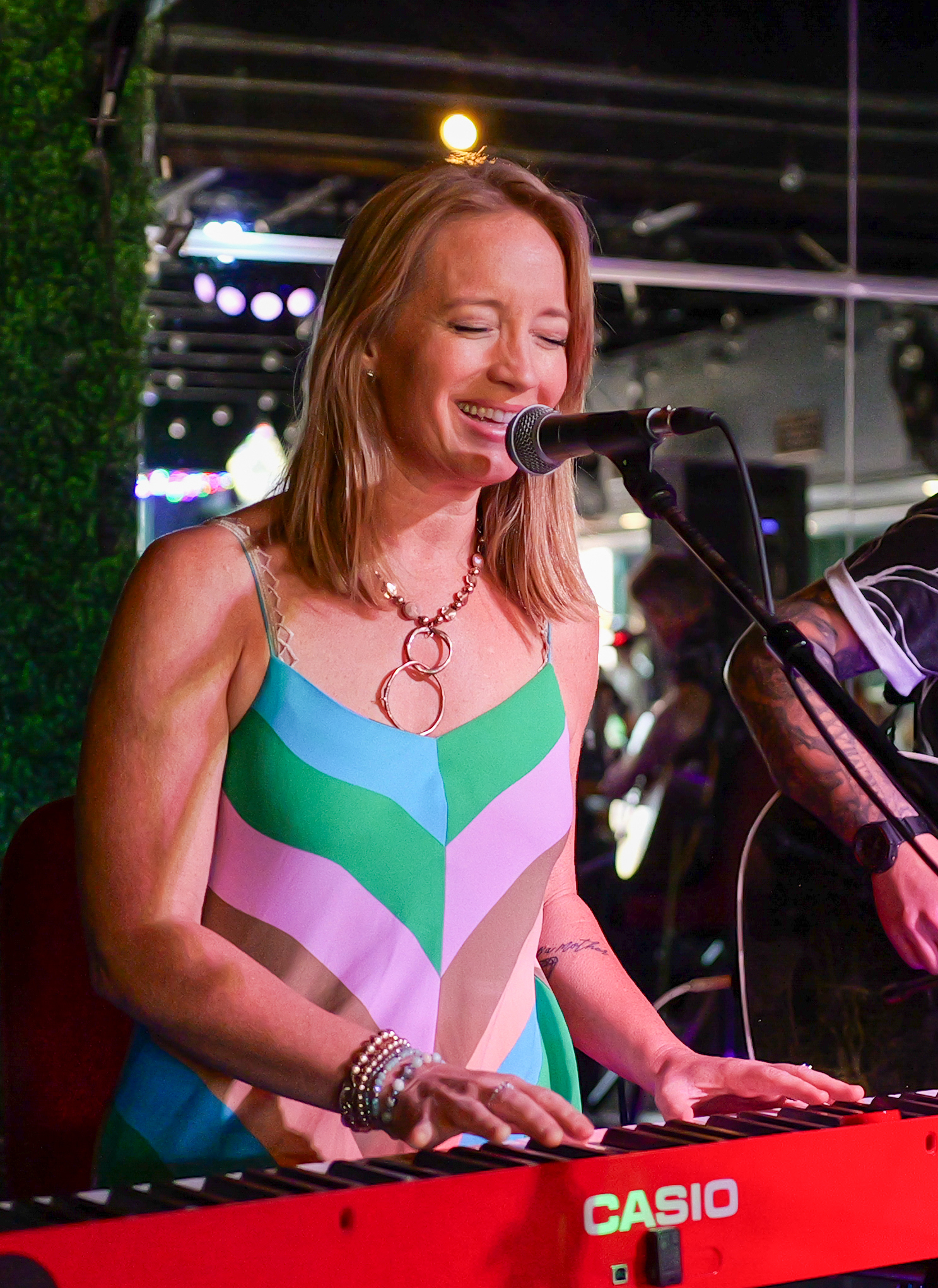
- Moreno Performing in 2024
- Born: Alissa Hayden Moreno; Ramah, New Mexico, U.S.
- Occupations: Musician; singer; songwriter; actress
- Years active: 2000–present
- Musical career
- Genres: Indie-pop; singer-songwriter; Americana
- Instruments: Vocals; piano; guitar; violin
- Labels: Interscope; Pi; BAAM; Veve Music
- Website: www.alissamorenomusic.com

Alissa Moreno is an American singer, songwriter, musician, and actress. Her music incorporates elements of Indie-pop, Country, Americana, and Folk. Her co-write "Every Day", recorded by Rascal Flatts, reached No. 2 on the Billboard Hot Country Songs charts and earned a Grammy nomination. She wrote and performed the theme song, Sisters for the ABC hit comedy, Hope & Faith as well as writing and performing the show ID, Far From Here, for Army Wives. Moreno's songs have been in numerous films and TV shows and have been recorded by many recording artists including John Oates, Javier Colon, Al Anderson, Morgan Heritage, Elvis Blue, and Mallary Hope.

== Career ==
Moreno is a singer, songwriter, and musician best known for her co-write, Every Day, recorded by Rascal Flatts, which received a Grammy nomination.

In 2006 she signed a publishing deal with Universal Music Group. Moreno has written songs with and for Colbie Caillat, Vertical Horizon, John Oates, and Javier Colon, and other recording artists. She has performed at The Opry, Hotel Café, The Viper Room, and the House of Blues, among other venues. In 2014 she wrote the song, Notice Me, for the young adult novel series, Wildflower and Shine Our Light for the 2015, The Road to You, both written by Alecia Whitaker, published by Little, Brown Book for Young Readers.

She created and starred in the 2005 short film, Super Chicks, and was the vocal coach to Ben Affleck for his SAG award-winning role in Hollywoodland.

Moreno has released two studio albums and was signed to Vere Music in 2022.

=== Discography ===
- 2021 - "Meet Again"
- 2019 – "Girls Go Hard"
- 2016 – "Getaway Car"
- 2012 – "What You're Made Of"
- 2011 – "Unbreakable"
- 2010 – "Original Songwriter Demos, Vol. 2", "Every Day", Warner Records
- 2008 – "In Your Wake"
- 2006 – MTV Presents Laguna Beach – Summer Can Last Forever, "Next Time", Interscope Records

=== "Every Day" ===
"Every Day", recorded by Rascal Flatts, was written by Moreno and Jeffrey Steele in 2008. Steele sent the song to record producer Dann Huff, who recommended the song to Rascal Flatts. The group recorded it for their Still Feels Good album, giving Moreno her second outside cut as a songwriter.

"Every Day" was nominated for a Grammy Award for Best Country Performance By a Duo or Group With Vocals in 2009.

The song debuted at number 42 on the Hot Country Songs chart dated March 8, 2008, reaching a peak of number 2 on that chart on the chart week of June 14, 2008.

Chart (2008)	Peak position
US Hot Country Songs (Billboard)	2
US Billboard Hot 100	45
US Billboard Pop 100	85
Canada Hot 100 (Billboard)	65

=== Songs Written for Other Artists ===
- 2020 - 3 Minute Movies recorded by Angus Gill on 3 Minute Movies album - writer
- 2018 - Pineapple Wine recorded by Morgan Heritage on Avrakedabra album (Grammy nomination for "Best Reggae Album) - writer
- 2017 - The Yee-Haw Song recorded by Duck Dynasty’s Uncle Si & The Sicotics - writer
- 2016 - Walking Blind recorded by Javier Colon on Gravity album - writer
- 2016 - Santa Be Good To Me recorded by John Oates and The Time Jumpers - writer
- 2012 - Strings recorded by Big Al Anderson featuring Vince Gill and Jerry Douglas - writer
- 2012 - Why (Nothing Else Matters) recorded by Kelly Sweet - writer
- 2011 - Only Wanna Be With You recorded by Elvis Blue - writer
- 2010 - That's My Little Girl and When recorded by Javier Colon winner The Voice (American season 1) - writer
- 2008 - Every Day (Grammy Nominated) recorded by Rascal Flatts - writer

== Awards ==
Year	Nominee / work	Award	Result
2018	Pineapple Wine	Grammy Award - Best Reggae Album	Nominated
2010	"Every Day"	BMI – Million-Air Award – Over One Million U.S. Radio Plays	Won
2009	"Better"	Just Plain Folks Music Songwriting Award	Won
2009	"Every Day"	CMT Music Award – Music Video of the Year	Won
2009	"Every Day"	BMI Country Award – Most Played BMI Country Songs	Won
2008	"Every Day"	Grammy Award – Best Performance by Group or Duo	Nominated
2006	"Far From Here"	Durango Songwriter's Expo - Write With the Hitmakers Contest/Pop Rock	Won

== Songs in TV and film ==
In 2008, Moreno's debut album, In Your Wake, was released on her label, Pi Records. Her first single, "Far From Here", was the theme song for the Lifetime television series Army Wives. Her song "Next Time" appeared on the soundtrack of the reality TV show Laguna Beach, and she co-wrote the theme song for the TV show Hope and Faith.

Year	Production	Title	Role	Network
2022	The Young and the Restless	"Under the Mistletoe"	Writer	CBS
2021	The Young and the Restless	"Sweet Love"	Writer	CBS
2019	Charmed	"Now We Fall"	Writer, performer	The CW
2018	Star	"Take It Or Leave It"	Writer, performer	Fox Broadcasting Company
2018	Music City	"Few More Days til Christmas"	Writer, performer	CMT
2017	Just Getting Started	"A Few More Days til Christmas"	Writer, performer	Broad Green Pictures
2015	Criminal Minds	"Sometime Soon"	Writer, performer	CBS
2014	Seed	"You're My Music"	Writer, performer	The CW
2013	The Girl's Guide to Depravity	"I Wanna Rule The World", "In My Groove"	Writer, performer	Cinemax
2013	The Vineyard	"Never Be The Same", "What You're Made Of", "Your Love	Writer, performer	ABC
2013	I Used to Be Fat	"How To Get Happy"	Writer, performer	MTV
2012	Cheer	"What You're Made Of"	Writer, performer	MTV
2011	What Chilli Wants	"Why Not Now"	Writer, performer	VH1
2011	Conversations With Lucifer	"Far From Here", "A Place For Me"	Writer, performer	NBC
2010	The City	"Hey World", "Why Not Now"	Writer, performer	MTV
2010	First Love, Second Chance	"Why Not Now"	Writer, performer	TV Land
2009	Sorority Wars	"Why Not Now"	Writer, performer	Lifetime
2009	Guiding Light	"Until I Figure it Out" (7 episodes)	Writer, performer	CBS
2008	Degrassi: The Next Generation	"Why Not Now"	Writer, performer	CTV
2008	The Hills	"Why Not Now", "Wildfires", "Take My Chances", "Unraveled", "Place For Me"	Writer, performer	MTV
2008	Days of Our Lives	"Why Not Now"	Writer, performer	NBC
2008	Drama in the Hills	"Wildfires"	Writer, performer	MTV
2007	Newport Harbor: The Real Orange County	"Unraveled", "One More Day"	Writer, performer	MTV
2007	Naturally, Sadie	"Why Not Now"	Writer, performer	Family
2007	Army Wives	"Far From Here"	Writer, performer	Lifetime
2007	What If God Were the Sun?	"Wildfires"	Writer, performer	Lifetime
2007	Engaged and Underage	"Why Not Now" (2 episodes)	Writer, performer	MTV
2006	Laguna Beach: The Real Orange County	"My Own Way", "Why Not Now", "Far From Here", "Next Time"	Writer, performer	MTV
2006	Hollywoodland		Vocal coach to Ben Affleck	Miramax Films
2006	All In	"Why Not Now"	Writer, performer	Film
2006	Rollergirls	"Far From Here"	Writer, performer	A&E Network
2005	Hope & Faith	"Sisters" (theme song: 21 episodes)	Writer, performer	ABC
2005	From Behind the Sunflower		Music composer	Film
2004	That's So Raven	"You and Me"	Writer, performer	Disney Channel

== Early life ==
Moreno was born in Ramah, New Mexico to Drake and Heather (Née) Moreno, who were elementary school teachers at the Ramah Navajo Indian Reservation. She began playing the violin at age two and learned to play the piano at five. She picked up the guitar at age 17. When asked by J.T. Ellison, during an interview about how she decided to become a singer-songwriter, Moreno replied, "I vacillated back and forth between actor and musician, but music came very easily, and it seemed more immediate. I pictured myself reciting monologues at parties, and then I pictured myself playing guitar and singing around a campfire. Music won". She attended Albuquerque High School and earned a Bachelor of Fine Arts degree at the Santa Fe University of Art and Design.
