= Every Day (Rascal Flatts song) =

Single by Rascal Flatts

from the album Still Feels Good
- Released: March 3, 2008
- Genre: Country pop
- Length: 4:15 (Album Version); 3:53 (Single Version)
- Label: Lyric Street
- Songwriters: Alissa Moreno; Jeffrey Steele
- Producers: Dann Huff; Rascal Flatts

Rascal Flatts singles chronology
"Winner at a Losing Game" (2007)	"Every Day" (2008)	"Bob That Head" (2008)

Music video
- "Every Day" at CMT.com

"Every Day" is a song written by Jeffrey Steele and Alissa Moreno and recorded by American country music group Rascal Flatts. It was released in March 2008 as the third single from their album Still Feels Good. It became their nineteenth consecutive Top 10 hit, reaching #2 on the Billboard Hot Country Songs charts. The song earned a Grammy nomination for Grammy Award for Best Country Performance by a Duo or Group with Vocals

== Content ==
The song is a mid-tempo ballad set in triple meter and primarily accompanied by piano, in which the narrator addresses someone else, telling of how that person keeps the narrator from making mistakes in life ("every day, you save my life").

Jeffrey Steele, one of the song's co-writers, was inspired to write down the title after meeting singer Sarah Buxton at a restaurant in Nashville, Tennessee. Buxton told Steele about her roommate, saying "Every day, she saves my life". Steele then went home thinking about a lyric. Later on, while at a songwriting seminar in Colorado, Steele met songwriter Alissa Moreno, who was playing a melody on the piano. Steele then sang the title that he had written alongside Moreno's melody, they worked on the lyric and melody, and the song was completed. He then sent the song to record producer Dann Huff, who recommended the song to Rascal Flatts. The group then recorded it for their Still Feels Good album, giving Moreno her second outside cut as a songwriter.

== Music video ==
A music video for the song was issued on April 17, 2008. It features actors portraying various dramatic scenes based on "the concept that a single act of kindness… making a difference in the lives of others", according to CMT. The video was created by Deaton Flanigen Productions. The video won the award for Group Video of the Year at the 2009 CMT Music Awards, the band's seventh consecutive and final win in that category. It was also nominated for Video of the Year.

== Chart performance ==
The song debuted at number 42 on the Hot Country Songs chart dated March 8, 2008, and reaching a peak of number 2 on the chart week of June 14, 2008, behind Brad Paisley's "I'm Still a Guy".

Chart (2008)	Peak position
US Hot Country Songs (Billboard)	2
US Billboard Hot 100	45
US Billboard Pop 100	85
Canada Hot 100 (Billboard)	65

=== Year-end charts ===
Chart (2008)	Position
US Country Songs (Billboard)	20
Canada Country (Billboard)	18
