= Take Me There (Rascal Flatts song) =

Single by Rascal Flatts

from the album Still Feels Good
- Released: July 9, 2007
- Genre: Country
- Length: 4:26 (Album version); 3:59 (Radio edit)
- Label: Lyric Street
- Songwriters: Kenny Chesney; Wendell Mobley; Neil Thrasher
- Producers: Dann Huff; Rascal Flatts

Rascal Flatts singles chronology
| "Stand" (2007) | "Take Me There" (2007) | "Winner at a Losing Game" (2007) |

"Take Me There" is a song recorded by American country music group Rascal Flatts. It was released in July 2007 as the first single from their album Still Feels Good. The song became their eighth number-one hit on the Hot Country Songs Chart the week of September 22, 2007.

== Content ==
"Take Me There" is the first single from the band's 2007 album Still Feels Good. Kenny Chesney wrote the song with Neil Thrasher and Wendell Mobley.

The song is composed in the key of E major with a main tempo of about 92 beats per minute. It is mainly based around the chord progression E-A/E.

== Critical reception ==
Kevin John Coyne of Country Universe gave the song both an "A" and "F" grade, writing that "Writing a review of this just seems like an exercise in futility. No fans will be won or lost by this performance. If you enjoy listening to 'I Melt' and 'Fast Cars and Freedom', then you’ll enjoy this. If a part of you died inside when reminded of those records, stay away. Far, far away."

== Charts ==
The song was Rascal Flatts' eighth number-one single on the Billboard Hot Country Songs charts. It reached that position on the chart dated for the week ending September 22, 2007 after a ten-week ascent. This was their fastest climbing single at the time, besting "What Hurts the Most", which took fourteen weeks to reach the number-one position.

| Chart (2007) | Peak position |
|---|---|
| US Hot Country Songs (Billboard) | 1 |
| US Billboard Hot 100 | 19 |
| US Billboard Pop 100 | 33 |
| Canada Hot 100 (Billboard) | 49 |

=== Year-end charts ===
| Chart (2007) | Position |
|---|---|
| US Country Songs (Billboard) | 5 |
