= I Melt =

Single by Rascal Flatts

from the album Melt
- Released: July 8, 2003
- Genre: Country
- Length: 3:54
- Label: Lyric Street
- Songwriters: Neil Thrasher; Wendell Mobley; Gary LeVox
- Producers: Mark Bright; Rascal Flatts; Marty Williams

Rascal Flatts singles chronology
"Love You Out Loud" (2003)	"I Melt" (2003)	"Mayberry" (2003)

"I Melt" is a song written by Gary LeVox, Wendell Mobley, and Neil Thrasher and recorded by American country music group Rascal Flatts. It was released in July 2003 as the third single from the band’s sophomore studio album Melt (2002). The song peaked at number 2 on the U.S. Billboard Hot Country Singles & Tracks chart, staying at that position for three weeks behind Toby Keith’s "I Love This Bar". This was the group’s seventh entry on that chart.

== Content ==
Gary LeVox said of the song, "That was truly enjoyable to write. Neil and Wendell had the melody idea and a chorus idea, and they called me in and we finished it that day. It’s a sexy tune. I think a lot of women would like to hear a man say they don’t have to do anything special to make him melt."

== Critical reception ==
Rick Cohoon of Allmusic gave the song a positive review. He stated in his review that "Gary LeVox delivers a sultry, passionate performance backed up by some of the best harmony in Nashville."

== Music video and controversy ==
The music video for "I Melt" was filmed in Miami, Florida by directors Robert Deaton and George Flanigan. It made headlines in USA Today for a shot featuring guitarist Joe Don Rooney's bare buttocks, and model Christina Auria taking a shower in the nude. When it debuted on CMT on June 28, 2003, it became the first video showing nudity to air on the network. Great American Country, on the other hand, banned the video when the group refused to release an edited version. It won Group/Duo Video of the Year at the 2004 CMT Flameworthy Video Music Awards.

In 2019, The Boot included the music video in a list of The Top 10 Sexiest Country Music Videos.

== Chart performance ==
"I Melt" debuted at number 54 on the U.S. Billboard Hot Country Singles & Tracks for the week of July 12, 2003.

Chart (2003)	Peak position
US Hot Country Songs (Billboard)	2
US Billboard Hot 100	34

=== Year-end charts ===
Chart (2003)	Position
US Country Songs (Billboard)	32
