= Love You Out Loud =

Single by Rascal Flatts

from the album Melt
- Released: January 20, 2003
- Recorded: 2002
- Genre: Country
- Length: 3:06
- Label: Lyric Street
- Songwriters: Brett James; Lonnie Wilson
- Producers: Mark Bright; Rascal Flatts; Marty Williams

Rascal Flatts singles chronology
"These Days" (2002)	"Love You Out Loud" (2003)	"I Melt" (2003)

"Love You Out Loud" is a song written by Brett James and Lonnie Wilson and recorded by American country music group Rascal Flatts. It was released in January 2003 as the second single from the band’s 2002 album Melt. The song peaked at number 3 on the US Billboard Hot Country Songs chart.

== Content ==
"Love You Out Loud" is about a man's desire to have everyone know how much he loves his lover. Joe Don Rooney said of the song, "That was another one we got when the tracks were finished. It knocked us out. We just knew we had to cut it. It’s Rascal Flatts to a "T". It’s energy, fun, all about being in love, and what any man would want to do for his girl."

== Music video ==
The music video is clips from their concerts, and it was directed by Milton Lage.

== Chart performance ==
"Love You Out Loud" debuted at number 59 on the US Billboard Hot Country Singles & Tracks chart for the week of January 25, 2003.

Chart (2003)	Peak position
US Hot Country Songs (Billboard)	3
US Billboard Hot 100	30

=== Year-end charts ===
Chart (2003)	Position
US Country Songs (Billboard)	27
