= Stand (Rascal Flatts song) =

Single by Rascal Flatts

from the album Me and My Gang
- Released: January 22, 2007
- Genre: Country
- Length: 3:28
- Label: Lyric Street
- Songwriters: Blair Daly; Danny Orton
- Producers: Dann Huff; Rascal Flatts

Rascal Flatts singles chronology
"My Wish" (2006)	"Stand" (2007)	"Take Me There" (2007)

"Stand" is a song written by Danny Orton and Blair Daly and recorded by American country music group Rascal Flatts. It was released in January 2007 as the fourth and final single from their album Me and My Gang. The song became their seventh number-one hit on Hot Country Songs chart on the week of May 12, 2007.

== Content ==
"Stand" is a country song with a theme of having to overcome obstacles in life.

== Music video ==
The music video was directed by Shaun Silva and premiered in early 2007. It features the group performing the number interlaced with clips of people in various professions, such as painting or mixed martial arts. The clip was nominated for Group Video of the Year at the 2008 CMT Music Awards, losing to the band's other nominated video for "Take Me There".

== Critical reception ==
Kevin John Coyne, reviewing the song for Country Universe, gave it a D rating. He summed up his review by saying to "remove all remaining charm and originality from the lyric, drain all life and energy from the production, and add the most pathetically wimpy lead vocal imaginable, and you have this single."

== 2025 re-recording ==
Rascal Flatts re-recorded the song with Brandon Lake on their 2025 album Life Is a Highway: Refueled Duets.

== Personnel ==
From Me and My Gang liner notes.

- Tim Akers - keyboards
- Tom Bukovac - guitars
- Eric Darken - percussion
- Jay DeMarcus - bass guitar
- Dann Huff - guitars
- Charlie Judge - keyboards
- Gary LeVox - lead vocals
- Chris McHugh - drums
- Joe Don Rooney - guitars
- Jonathan Yudkin - fiddle, mandolin

== Chart performance ==
Chart (2007)	Peak position
US Hot Country Songs (Billboard)	1
US Billboard Hot 100	46
US Billboard Pop 100	80
Canada Hot 100 (Billboard)	54

=== Year-end charts ===
Chart (2007)	Position
US Country Songs (Billboard)	11
