= Skin (Sarabeth) =

Single by Rascal Flatts

from the album Feels Like Today
- Released: August 15, 2005
- Recorded: 2004
- Genre: Country pop
- Length: 4:26
- Label: Lyric Street
- Songwriters: Doug Johnson; Joe Henry
- Producers: Mark Bright; Rascal Flatts; Marty Williams

Rascal Flatts singles chronology
"Fast Cars and Freedom" (2005)	"Skin (Sarabeth)" (2005)	"What Hurts the Most" (2006)

"Skin (Sarabeth)", originally titled "Skin" is a song written by Doug Johnson and Joe Henry, and recorded by American country music group Rascal Flatts. The song was originally a hidden track on the first shipment of their album, Feels Like Today, and charted in mid-2005 as an album cut (just called "Skin" at the time) while the single "Fast Cars and Freedom" was climbing the charts. "Skin" became a single in late-2005, peaking at number two on the country charts, and 42 on the Billboard Hot 100 chart.

== Content ==
The song is about a girl from Kentucky named Sarabeth who falls ill, and while ill, notices that she has a persistent bruise. A visit to hospital results in a diagnosis of Leukemia ("between the red cells and white, something's not right"), a form of cancer that requires chemotherapy. Sarabeth is afraid of the effects that the therapy may have on her, notably hair loss, and draws comfort from her dream of dancing with her boyfriend at her high school prom.

When Sarabeth wakes up on the morning before the dance, she finds hair on her pillow, and cries while being embraced by her mother. She thinks it would be a mistake for her boyfriend to take her to the prom in this condition. By the time that her boyfriend arrives at her home to accompany her to the dance, she has lost all her hair and is concealing her baldness with a wrap. When her boyfriend removes his baseball cap, she and her family are surprised to see that he is bald too: he has shaved his head too as a demonstration of his support for her. When they dance together, she realizes that her dream has come true: "Her very first true love is holding her close... And for a moment, she isn't scared."

== History ==
Joe Henry wrote the song in 2003 with Doug Johnson. He offered the song to Rascal Flatts, who expressed interest in recording it. The band placed it as a hidden track at the end of Feels Like Today because the recording contract allowed for only eleven songs on the album, and because the band did not think that "Skin" fit in thematically with the rest of the project.

A radio host at WUSN in Chicago first heard the song while listening to the album in the car with his family, and soon received multiple phone calls asking him to play the song. The airplay received from WUSN caused the song to chart for five months as a non-single, and Lyric Street Records later re-issued Feels Like Today with "Skin" listed as the twelfth track.

== Music video ==
The video, directed by Deaton Flanigan was filmed in Orlando, Florida, and features a cast of Florida talent. South Florida actor Doug Williford appears as Sarabeth's father. Actress Deborah Shannon appeared as Sarabeth's mother. Child actor Johnny Maio appears in the final scene as Sarabeth's little brother. The band is seen performing the song in a room with water ballet dancers and (starting with the second chorus) a full-haired Sarabeth and her boyfriend performing around them. All the action scenes are shown in greyscale except for Sarabeth herself, a technique used to show emotion.

The video won Group/Duo Video of the Year at the 2006 CMT Music Awards.

== Critical reception ==
Kevin John Coyne, reviewing the song for Country Universe, gave it a negative rating. He said that "the nasal vocal is too much of a turn-off for me."

== Chart performance ==
"Skin (Sarabeth)" re-entered the U.S. Billboard Hot Country Songs as an official single at number 42 for the week of August 20, 2005.

Chart (2005)	Peak position
Canada Country (Radio & Records)	2
US Hot Country Songs (Billboard)	2
US Billboard Hot 100	42
US Billboard Pop 100	74

=== Year-end charts ===
Chart (2005)	Position
US Country Songs (Billboard)	44
