= Life Is a Highway =

1991 single by Tom Cochrane

- European CD and 7-inch artwork

Single by Tom Cochrane

from the album Mad Mad World
- B-side: "Emotional Truth"
- Released: September 20, 1991
- Genre: Country rock
- Length: 4:26
- Label: Capitol
- Songwriter: Tom Cochrane
- Producers: Tom Cochrane; Joe Hardy

Tom Cochrane singles chronology
"Sail On" (1976)	"Life Is a Highway" (1991)	"No Regrets" (1991)

Alternative cover
- UK CD and 7-inch artwork

Music video
- "Life Is a Highway" on YouTube

"Life Is a Highway" is a song by Canadian musician Tom Cochrane from his second studio album, Mad Mad World (1991). Released in September 1991, by Capitol Records, the single became a number-one hit in Canada in late 1991. "Life Is a Highway" also peaked at number six on both the US Billboard Hot 100 and Cash Box Top 100 in August 1992 and reached the top two in Australia and New Zealand the same year. The accompanying music video was directed by David Storey. The song was covered by Chris LeDoux for his 1998 album One Road Man and Rascal Flatts in 2006 for the Cars soundtrack.

In 2016 a 322-kilometre (200 mi) section of Manitoba Provincial Road 391 was designated "Tom Cochrane's Life Is a Highway" in honour of the singer, born near that highway, and the song.

== Background and release ==
Cochrane has stated that "Life Is a Highway" was originally conceived in the 1970s as "Love Is a Highway" while he was still a member of Red Rider, but was shelved at that time because he felt the unfinished song was unusable. Following a trip with his family to eastern Africa with the World Vision famine relief organization, Cochrane revisited the song on the advice of his friend John Webster, an instrumentalist on the Mad Mad World album. In a 2017 interview with The Canadian Press to mark the song's 25th anniversary, Cochrane said Webster encouraged him to revisit the demonstration (demo) recording, which at that point only had mumbled vocals and improvised lyrics, but not the song's well-known chorus. "(The song) became a pep talk to myself... saying you can't really control all of this stuff, you just do the best you can," he says. Cochrane says he was trying to make sense of the poverty he witnessed on his trip, which he found "shocking and traumatic".

Eventually, the original demo version was released on the 25th-anniversary reissue of Mad Mad World under the original title "Love Is a Highway". He later said the up-tempo spirit of the song came from looking for something positive to "hang the experience on." Most of the vocals on the track were recorded in Cochrane's small home studio. The song was Cochrane's only top-40 hit in the United States, reaching number six on both the Billboard Hot 100 and Cash Box Top 100. In Canada, the song stayed at number one for two weeks, and three other singles from the album charted within the top 10; "No Regrets" peaked at number three, "Sinking Like a Sunset" reached number two, and "Washed Away" climbed to number seven. In Australia and New Zealand, the single peaked at number two in both countries. Elsewhere, it became a top-40 hit in Germany, the Netherlands, and Sweden.

== Music video ==
The music video for "Life Is a Highway" was directed by David Storey and produced by Albert Botha. The video was shot in Alberta's Badlands, near the town of Drumheller. Many of the shots are in familiar locations along the Dinosaur Trail, including Cochrane playing guitar amid the hoodoos and the couple, Kait Shane and Brennan Elliott, running around the car while it rides the Bleriot Ferry across the Red Deer River. It also features an older man (gas station attendant), a couple (tall man, short wife), two women (Jacqueline and Joyce Robbins) from an Anabaptist religious order (Alberta has a population of Hutterites), and two First Nations men, one wearing a baseball cap with the words "Oka Standoff" printed on it, referring to the Oka Crisis (a land dispute between a group of Mohawk people and the town of Oka, Quebec). The car featured in the music video is a 1965 Chevrolet Impala Super Sport.

== Track listings ==
- 7-inch, cassette, and mini-CD single
1. "Life Is a Highway" – 4:24
2. "Emotional Truth" – 5:59
- UK CD single
1. "Life Is a Highway" – 4:24
2. "Emotional Truth" – 5:59
3. "Get Back Up" – 4:39
- European maxi-CD single
1. "Life Is a Highway" – 4:24
2. "Emotional Truth" – 5:59
3. "Lunatic Fringe" (live) – 5:00

== Personnel ==
Personnel are taken from the Mad Mad World liner notes.

- Tom Cochrane – lead and backing vocals, electric guitar, harmonica, pre-production, arrangements
- John Webster – organ, percussion, pre-production, arrangements
- Ken "Spider" Sinnaeve – bass
- Mickey Currey – drums
- Molly Johnson – backing vocals
- John Cody – backing vocals

== Charts ==
=== Weekly charts ===
Chart (1991–1992)	Peak position
Australia (ARIA)	2
Canada Retail Singles (The Record)	1
Canada Top Singles (RPM)	1
Germany (GfK)	35
Netherlands (Dutch Top 40)	27
Netherlands (Single Top 100)	35
New Zealand (Recorded Music NZ)	2
Sweden (Sverigetopplistan)	23
UK Singles (Official Charts)	62
UK Airplay (Music Week)	45
US Billboard Hot 100	6
US Adult Contemporary (Billboard)	45
US Album Rock Tracks (Billboard)	6
US Top 40/Mainstream (Billboard)	16
US Cash Box Top 100	6

=== Year-end charts ===
Chart (1991)	Position
Canada Top Singles (RPM)	5

Chart (1992)	Position
Australia (ARIA)	27
New Zealand (RIANZ)	9
US Billboard Hot 100	18
US Album Rock Tracks (Billboard)	11
US Cash Box Top 100	15

=== Decade-end charts ===
Chart (1990–1990)	Position
Canada (Nielsen SoundScan)	33

== Certifications ==
Region	Certification	Certified units/sales
Australia (ARIA)	Gold	35,000^{^}
Canada (Music Canada)	Gold	50,000^{^}
New Zealand (RMNZ)	2× Platinum	60,000^{‡}
United States (RIAA)	Gold	500,000^{^}
^{^} Shipments figures based on certification alone.^{‡} Sales+streaming figures based on certification alone.

== Release history ==
Region	Date	Format(s)	Label(s)	Ref.
Canada	September 20, 1991	—N/a	Capitol	
Australia	March 23, 1992	CD; cassette	Capitol	
United States	April 6, 1992	Cassette	Capitol	
United Kingdom	June 15, 1992	7-inch vinyl; CD; cassette	Capitol	
Japan	August 5, 1992	Mini-CD	Capitol	

== Chris LeDoux version ==
"Life Is a Highway"
- 7-inch jukebox vinyl single

Single by Chris LeDoux

from the album One Road Man
- B-side: "Hooked on an 8 Second Ride"
- Released: 1999
- Genre: Country
- Length: 3:49
- Label: Capitol Nashville
- Songwriter: Tom Cochrane

Chris LeDoux singles chronology
"Bang a Drum" (1998)	"Life Is a Highway" (1999)	"Stampede" (1999)

Music video
- "Life Is a Highway" on YouTube

In 1998, Chris LeDoux covered "Life Is a Highway" for his album One Road Man. Changes include the intro, timing of vocal entrances on the chorus, and location names between the first and second chorus. LeDoux's version was released as a single the following year and peaked at number 64 on the Billboard Hot Country Songs chart during the week of June 12, 1999, and remained at the spot for nine weeks.

=== Music video ===
The music video for the song, directed by Michael Salomon, takes place on multiple roads and highways as well as a blue and red static themed room. When on roads and highways, there is a chance for LeDoux to appear on a television that is sitting on a sidewalk or grass, however, while the background behind LeDoux (that appears on the TV) is the same background as everything behind the TV itself, LeDoux does not appear to be standing behind the TV. In most locations, LeDoux is walking down a road as at the start of the music video. The video ends with LeDoux singing the chorus while appearing on a flap-down TV inside of someone's car, then transitioning to LeDoux being once again in the static room and then walking out of it. After LeDoux leaves the room, the screen slowly fades to black and the video ends.

=== Charts ===
Chart (1999)	Peak position
US Hot Country Songs (Billboard)	64

== Rascal Flatts version ==
"Life Is a Highway"

Single by Rascal Flatts

from the album Me and My Gang and Cars: The Soundtrack
- Released: June 6, 2006
- Genre: Country rock
- Length: 4:36
- Label: Lyric Street; Walt Disney
- Songwriter: Tom Cochrane
- Producers: Dann Huff; Rascal Flatts

Rascal Flatts singles chronology
"Me and My Gang" (2006)	"Life Is a Highway" (2006)	"My Wish" (2006)

Music video
- "Life Is a Highway" on YouTube

American country music band Rascal Flatts recorded a cover of the song for the Pixar animated film Cars, which was released on June 9, 2006. The song sold a large quantity of digital downloads, leading to a number seven peak on the Billboard Hot 100 (one position lower than Cochrane's original version). In addition, the cover was placed as a bonus track on later versions of the album Me and My Gang, and also was included on Greatest Hits Volume 1 (2008) and Twenty Years of Rascal Flatts: The Greatest Hits (2020). This version also won the "Favorite Song from a Movie" and "Favorite Remake" awards at the 33rd People's Choice Awards. Rascal Flatts re-recorded the song with Lzzy Hale on their 2025 album Life Is a Highway: Refueled Duets. With over 1 billion lifetime streams on Spotify as of July 2026, the song is the band's most streamed song of all time.

The instrumental of the Rascal Flatts' cover version was prominently featured in the Top Gear: US Special, which aired February 11, 2007. The song is included on the soundtrack for Cars Mater-National Championship and Lego Rock Band. It topped the two million mark in paid downloads as of the chart dated March 28, 2009. As of March 2013, the song has sold over three million copies in the US. On July 14, 2015, Scott Walker, Republican Governor of Wisconsin, launched his presidential campaign as Republican Party nominee in Waukesha, Wisconsin using the song. On December 8, 2020, Harmonix announced that the cover would be featured on the video game FUSER, as a DLC on December 10, 2020. The song is also featured in video games such as Rocket League. During the 2026 FIFA World Cup, British broadcaster, ITV used the song for the title sequence for its coverage of the tournament.

=== Music video ===
The music video portrays the three band members pulling into a drive-in theater driving three vintage vehicles. The cars allude to three characters from Cars: Lightning McQueen, Doc Hudson and Mater. As the projector rolls, scenes from the film are shown as the band plays through the number. It was directed by Shaun Silva. The video was nominated for Group Video of the Year at the 2007 CMT Music Awards, losing to the band's other nominated video for "What Hurts the Most".

=== Charts ===
The Rascal Flatts version subsequently became a hit on the US Billboard Hot 100 chart, where it peaked at number seven. Even though it was not officially released to country radio, many country stations played the song as an album cut, overlapping with their then-current country single "My Wish". The unsolicited country airplay brought "Life Is a Highway" to number 18 on the US Hot Country Songs chart. The song has sold 3.4 million copies in the US as of June 2016.

==== Weekly charts ====
Chart (2006)	Peak position
US Hot Country Songs (Billboard)	18
Canada Country (Billboard)	10
US Billboard Hot 100	7

Chart (2021)	Peak position
Sweden Heatseeker (Sverigetopplistan)	16

2026 weekly chart performance
Chart (2026)	Peak position
Norway Airplay (IFPI Norge)	97

==== Year-end charts ====
Chart (2006)	Position
US Billboard Hot 100	76

=== Certifications ===
Region	Certification	Certified units/sales
Denmark (IFPI Danmark)	2× Platinum	180,000^{‡}
New Zealand (RMNZ)	4× Platinum	120,000^{‡}
United Kingdom (BPI)	2× Platinum	1,200,000^{‡}
United States (RIAA)	8× Platinum	8,000,000^{‡}
^{‡} Sales+streaming figures based on certification alone.
