= Feels Like Today (song) =

Single by Rascal Flatts

from the album Feels Like Today
- Released: June 21, 2004
- Recorded: 2004
- Genre: Country
- Length: 3:26
- Label: Lyric Street
- Songwriters: Wayne Hector; Steve Robson
- Producers: Mark Bright; Rascal Flatts; Marty Williams

Rascal Flatts singles chronology
"Mayberry" (2003)	"Feels Like Today" (2004)	"Bless the Broken Road" (2004)

"Feels Like Today" is a song written by Wayne Hector and Steve Robson and recorded by American country music group Rascal Flatts. It was released in June 2004 as the first single and title track from the album of the same name. The song peaked at number 9 on the U.S. Billboard Hot Country Singles & Tracks chart in 2004.

"Feels Like Today" was featured on the Smallville: The Metropolis Mix soundtrack. It was played during the Season 4 episode, "Run." The song was later included on the band's Greatest Hits Volume 1 (2008).

== Music video ==
The music video was directed and produced by Deaton-Flanigen, and premiered on CMT on August 12, 2004. It was filmed in Asbury Park, New Jersey. It features the trio performing the song on the boardwalk, outside the Monmouth County Prison, and inside Boardwalk Hall accompanied by a string section. In between these scenes, shots of a photographer dressed in all black and a top hat is seen delivering pictures to several depressed people on the dried up, empty boardwalk. At the end of the video, the people open the photo envelopes, and see photos of them with their families, instantly cheering them up. The photographer then simply walks away.

The video won Group/Duo Video of the Year at the 2005 CMT Music Awards and was also nominated for Video of the Year.

== Chart performance ==
Chart (2004)	Peak position
Canada Country (Radio & Records)	10
US Hot Country Songs (Billboard)	9
US Billboard Hot 100	56

=== Year-end charts ===
Chart (2004)	Position
US Country Songs (Billboard)	45
