= Fast Cars and Freedom =

Single by Rascal Flatts

from the album Feels Like Today
- Released: March 21, 2005
- Recorded: 2004
- Genre: Country rock
- Length: 4:23 (album version); 3:55 (single version)
- Label: Lyric Street
- Songwriters: Gary LeVox; Wendell Mobley; Neil Thrasher
- Producers: Mark Bright; Rascal Flatts; Marty Williams

Rascal Flatts singles chronology
"Bless the Broken Road" (2004)	"Fast Cars and Freedom" (2005)	"Skin (Sarabeth)" (2005)

"Fast Cars and Freedom" is a song recorded by American country music group Rascal Flatts. It was released on March 21, 2005, as the third single from the album Feels Like Today. It was the group's fourth Number One single on the U.S. Billboard Hot Country Songs charts.

The single was co-written by Rascal Flatts' lead singer Gary LeVox, along with Wendell Mobley and Neil Thrasher. Previously, the three writers had also written Rascal Flatts' 2003 single "I Melt".

== Other versions ==
Rascal Flatts re-recorded the song with Jason Aldean on the 2025 Life Is a Highway: Refueled Duets.

== Chart performance ==
"Fast Cars and Freedom" debuted at number 56 on the U.S. Billboard Hot Country Songs for the week of March 26, 2005.

Chart (2005)	Peak position
Canada Country (Radio & Records)	2
US Hot Country Songs (Billboard)	1
US Billboard Hot 100	38
US Billboard Pop 100	70

=== Year-end charts ===
Chart (2005)	Position
US Country Songs (Billboard)	5
