= Cars (soundtrack) =

Soundtrack album to the 2006 animated film

Cars: Original Soundtrack

Soundtrack album by Various Artists
- Released: June 6, 2006
- Recorded: 2005–2006
- Studio: Sony Pictures Studios (score)
- Genres: Pop; blues; country; rock
- Length: 52:28
- Label: Walt Disney
- Producer: Randy Newman

Randy Newman chronology
Meet the Fockers (2004)	Cars (2006)	Leatherheads (2008)

Singles from Cars: The Soundtrack
- 1. "Life Is a Highway" Released: June 6, 2006; 2. "Real Gone" Released: June 6, 2006; 3. "Our Town" Released: June 6, 2006

Cars: Original Soundtrack is the soundtrack album to the 2006 Disney/Pixar film of the same name. Released by Walt Disney Records on June 6, 2006, nine songs from the soundtrack are from popular and contemporary artists. The styles of these songs vary between pop, blues, country, and rock. The remaining eleven pieces are orchestral scores composed and conducted by Randy Newman. The soundtrack was released three days before the film's release into theaters. On November 25, 2006, the soundtrack's position on the Billboard 200 shot up from #126 to #47, with a 209% sales increase of 25,000 units, likely due to the Cars DVD being released earlier that month for the Christmas shopping season. This was the first Pixar soundtrack to ever achieve Gold Certification in the United States. It is now Platinum in the U.S.

== Reception ==
Professional ratings
Review scores
Source	Rating
Allmusic	3.5/5 stars

At the 49th Grammy Awards the soundtrack was nominated for the Best Compilation Soundtrack Album, while the John Mayer version of "Route 66" was also nominated for Best Solo Rock Vocal Performance and "Our Town" won the award for Best Song Written for a Motion Picture, Television or Other Visual Media. The track was also nominated for Best Original Song at the 79th Academy Awards.

== Track listing ==
All music/tracks composed and performed by Randy Newman, except where noted.

No.	Title	Writer(s)	Artist(s)	Length
1.	"Real Gone (2005)"	Sheryl Crow and John Shanks	Crow	3:22
2.	"Route 66 (1961)"	Bobby Troup	Chuck Berry	2:52
3.	"Life Is a Highway (1991)"	Tom Cochrane	Rascal Flatts	4:37
4.	"Behind the Clouds (2005)"	Brad Paisley, Frank Rogers	Paisley	4:09
5.	"Our Town (2005)"	Randy Newman	James Taylor	4:07
6.	"Sh-Boom (1954)"	William Edwards, Carl Feaster, Claude Feaster, James Keyes and Floyd McRae	The Chords	2:26
7.	"Route 66 (2005)"	Bobby Troup	John Mayer	3:25
8.	"Find Yourself (2005)"	Paisley	Paisley	4:11
9.	"Opening Race"			2:05
10.	"McQueen's Lost"			2:29
11.	"My Heart Would Know (1951)"	Hank Williams	Williams	2:27
12.	"Bessie"			0:59
13.	"Dirt Is Different"			1:28
14.	"New Road"			1:17
15.	"Tractor Tipping"			1:22
16.	"McQueen & Sally"			2:00
17.	"Goodbye"			2:42
18.	"Pre-Race Pageantry"			1:31
19.	"The Piston Cup"			1:52
20.	"The Big Race"			3:07
Total length:				52:28

== Lightning McQueen's Fast Tracks ==
Lightning McQueen's Fast Tracks

Compilation album by Various artists
- Released: June 6, 2006
- Genres: Pop, country rock
- Length: 36:46
- Label: Walt Disney
- Producer: Fred Mollin

Professional ratings
Review scores
Source	Rating
AllMusic	2.5/5 stars

Lightning McQueen's Fast-Tracks is a compilation album produced by Fred Mollin, that contains "revved-up road tunes" not featured in but inspired by Cars.

=== Track listing ===
No.	Title	Writer(s)	Performer(s)	Length
1.	"My Wonderful Car"	Fred Mollin, Blue Sea Band, Lyle Gudmensen	Lyle Gudmunsen	3:18
2.	"Black and White Thunderbird"	Denise Ferri, Peggy Santiglia, Arleen Lanzotti The Delicates	Jaime Babbitt and Britt Savage	2:25
3.	"Road Trip"	Fred Mollin and the Blue Sea Band	Fred Mollin and the Blue Sea Band, Tom Hambridge	3:30
4.	"You Can't Catch Me"	Chuck Berry	Joy Lynn White	2:51
5.	"Rocking Little Roadster"	Mark Johnson, Fred Mollin, Jay Landers	Gunnar Nelson	3:40
6.	"On the Road Again"	Floyd Jones, Alan Wilson	Kevin Montgomery	2:29
7.	"My Old Yellow Car"	Fred Mollin and the Blue Sea Band	Gordie Sampson	3:34
8.	"Hot Rod Hybrid"	Mark Johnson, Fred Mollin, Jay Landers	Pat Buchanan	2:52
9.	"I Got a New Car"	Fred Mollin and the Blue Sea Band	Tom Hambridge	3:05
10.	"Pick Up Truck"	Mark Johnson, Fred Mollin, Jay Landers	Mark Johnson	2:42
11.	"My Old Car"	Allen Toussaint	Johnny Neel	2:41
12.	"I've Been Everywhere"	Hank Snow (this version)	Webb Wilder	3:31
Total length:				36:46

== Charts ==
=== Weekly charts ===
Chart (2006–2007)	Peak position
Austrian Albums (Ö3 Austria)	72
Canadian Albums (Billboard)	41
French Albums (SNEP)	180
US Billboard 200	6
US Soundtrack Albums (Billboard)	2

=== Year-end charts ===
Chart (2006)	Peak position
US Billboard 200	101
US Soundtrack Albums (Billboard)	7

Chart (2007)	Peak position
US Billboard 200	171
US Soundtrack Albums (Billboard)	9

== Certifications ==
Region	Certification	Certified units/sales
Denmark (IFPI Danmark)	Gold	10,000^{‡}
New Zealand (RMNZ)	Platinum	15,000^{‡}
United States (RIAA)	Platinum	1,000,000^{^}
^{^} Shipments figures based on certification alone.^{‡} Sales+streaming figures based on certification alone.
