= These Days (Rascal Flatts song) =

Single by Rascal Flatts

from the album Melt
- Released: June 24, 2002
- Genre: Country pop; country rock; pop rock
- Length: 4:14 (album version); 3:36 (radio edit)
- Label: Lyric Street
- Songwriters: Jeffrey Steele; Steve Robson; Danny Wells
- Producers: Mark Bright; Rascal Flatts; Marty Williams

Rascal Flatts singles chronology
| "I'm Movin' On" (2001) | "These Days" (2002) | "Love You Out Loud" (2003) |

"These Days" is a song written by Jeffrey Steele, Steve Robson, and Danny Wells and recorded by American country music group Rascal Flatts. It was released in June 2002 as the first single from the band’s 2002 album Melt. The song became their first number one hit on the U.S. Billboard Hot Country Singles & Tracks (now Hot Country Songs) chart in November 2002.

== Content ==
This song is about a man who unexpectedly crosses paths with a former lover and they tell each other what has happened since they saw each other last including how she married a rodeo cowboy in the second verse. He tells her that since she has gone from his life, most of his time is spent thinking and dreaming about her.

Gary LeVox said of the song, "We knew this was a special song. We’d already completed the album but we dropped a song that we wrote to put this on our album."

In 2026, Rascal Flatts bassist Jay DeMarcus released a new version of "These Days" with his rock band Generation Radio, singing lead vocal on the updated track.

== Recording ==
After the completion of recording for Melt, the band learned there was money in the recording budget for several more songs. They then recorded "Love You Out Loud" and "These Days" and being so impressed by the latter they replaced a song they wrote from the album with it.

== Music video ==
The music video was directed by Deaton-Flanigen Productions in the summer of 2002. DeMarcus met his future wife Allison Alderson, who portrays LeVox's love interest in the video, during filming. The clip won Group/Duo Video of the Year at the 2003 CMT Flameworthy Awards, the first of what would be seven consecutive wins for Rascal Flatts in that category. It was also nominated for Video of the Year and Hottest Male Video of the Year.

== Chart performance ==
"These Days" debuted at number 48 on the U.S. Billboard Hot Country Singles & Tracks for the week of June 29, 2002.

| Chart (2002) | Peak position |
|---|---|
| US Hot Country Songs (Billboard) | 1 |
| US Billboard Hot 100 | 23 |

=== Year-end charts ===
| Chart (2002) | Position |
|---|---|
| US Country Songs (Billboard) | 41 |

| Chart (2003) | Position |
|---|---|
| US Country Songs (Billboard) | 43 |
