= Bless the Broken Road =

Popular country song first recorded by The Nitty Gritty Dirt Band

Song by Nitty Gritty Dirt Band

from the album Acoustic
- Released: 1994
- Genre: Country; pop
- Length: 3:50
- Label: Liberty
- Songwriters: Marcus Hummon; Bobby Boyd; Jeff Hanna
- Producer: Nitty Gritty Dirt Band

"Bless the Broken Road"

Song by Marcus Hummon

from the album All in Good Time
- Released: September 5, 1995
- Genre: Country
- Length: 4:09
- Label: Columbia
- Songwriters: Marcus Hummon; Bobby Boyd; Jeff Hanna
- Producer: Monroe Jones

"Bless the Broken Road" is a song that has been recorded by several American country music artists. Co-written by Marcus Hummon, Bobby Boyd, and Jeff Hanna in 1994, it tells how the journey through relationship heartbreak and disappointment was an important series of lessons along the broken road to finding one’s true love. It was first recorded by the Nitty Gritty Dirt Band in 1994, followed by Hummon on his 1995 album All in Good Time.

Since then, many artists have recorded the song, with Rascal Flatts' version being the highest-charting, becoming a number 1 hit on the Billboard country music charts in 2005 and earning the songwriters a Grammy Award for Best Country Song.

== History ==
Jeff Hanna explained that after returning from his honeymoon with Matraca Berg in 1994, he got together with Marcus Hummun to write. They discussed how difficult or unexpected paths in life can eventually lead somewhere better. Hummon already had the beginnings of the song, inspired partly by a conversation he’d had with Bobby Boyd. Hanna said he and Hummon wrote most of the song within a couple of hours.

Singer-songwriter Marcus Hummon co-wrote the song with Jeff Hanna (of Nitty Gritty Dirt Band) and Bobby Boyd. Nitty Gritty Dirt Band recorded it for the 1994 album Acoustic. One year later, Hummon covered the song for his debut album All in Good Time for Columbia Records. His rendition includes backing vocals from Hanna and Matraca Berg. Michael McCall of New Country magazine thought that Hummon's rendition was the best track on the album.

Sons of the Desert recorded its own version of the song, for a planned second album on Epic Records that would have been released in 1998. This album was not released, due to a dispute between the band and its label.

Since then, many artists have recorded the song including Deborah Joy Winans, Melodie Crittenden, Geoff Moore, Selah, Jamie Slocum, Carrie Underwood, Buddy Greene, Boyce Avenue, and Rascal Flatts.

== Melodie Crittenden version ==
"Broken Road"

Single by Melodie Crittenden

from the album Melodie Crittenden
- Released: January 1998
- Genre: Country
- Length: 3:52
- Label: Asylum #9945
- Songwriters: Marcus Hummon; Bobby Boyd; Jeff Hanna
- Producers: Byron Gallimore; Stephony Smith

Melodie Crittenden singles chronology
"Broken Road" (1998)	"I Should've Known" (1998)

Also in 1998, Melodie Crittenden recorded the song under the title "Broken Road" and included it on her self-titled debut album for Asylum Records. Released as the first of two singles from it, this version was a number 42 single on the Billboard Hot Country Singles & Tracks (now Hot Country Songs) charts.

This version was featured on an episode of Dawson's Creek.

=== Critical reception ===
Billboard gave Crittenden's version a positive review in the January 17, 1998, issue, calling it "sheer poetry with a moving message."

=== Chart positions ===
Chart (1998)	Peak position
Canada Country Singles (RPM)	48
US Hot Country Songs (Billboard)	42

== Rascal Flatts version ==
"Bless the Broken Road"

Single by Rascal Flatts

from the album Feels Like Today
- Released: November 1, 2004
- Genre: Country pop; Christian country
- Length: 3:46 (Album Version); 3:38 (Single Version)
- Label: Lyric Street
- Songwriters: Marcus Hummon; Bobby Boyd; Jeff Hanna
- Producers: Mark Bright; Rascal Flatts; Marty Williams

Rascal Flatts singles chronology
"Feels Like Today" (2004)	"Bless the Broken Road" (2004)	"Fast Cars and Freedom" (2005)

The highest-charting rendition is by the country music group Rascal Flatts, who cut the song for their third studio album Feels Like Today. Released in November 2004, this version spent five weeks at number one on Hot Country Singles & Tracks. It also won a Grammy Award for Best Country Song and earned a seven-times platinum certification from the Recording Industry Association of America. The song topped the 2 million mark in paid downloads on September 18, 2010. It's Rascal Flatts' third song to reach that mark, following "Life Is a Highway" and "What Hurts the Most". As of January 2020, the song has sold 3,719,000 copies in the US.

On May 25, 2005, during a live performance on American Idol by Carrie Underwood and Rascal Flatts, an additional version was recorded. While not in wide release, and never included on an album, the version received enough radio airplay to enter the country music charts at number 50.

In 2009, an acoustic version recorded by Rascal Flatts was included in the soundtrack of Hannah Montana: The Movie.

On May 19, 2012, "Bless the Broken Road" debuted at number 76 and went to number 41 next week on the UK Singles chart (The Official Charts Company), the band's first and only appearance on the chart.

On February 26, 2020, the song received renewed attention after California-based artist RMR sampled the piano melody for his debut song "Rascal". The song and music video would go on to be a viral hit.

=== Song information ===
Rascal Flatts' version of the song is set in the key of C major, with a vocal range from C_{3} to A_{4}.

=== Charts ===
Chart (2004–2012)	Peak position
Canada Country (Radio & Records)	1
Ireland (IRMA)	35
Sweden (Sverigetopplistan)	58
UK Singles (The Official Charts Company)	41
US Hot Country Songs (Billboard)	1
US Billboard Hot 100	29
US Billboard Pop 100	40
US Adult Contemporary (Billboard)	20
Chart (2005)	Peak position
US Hot Country Songs (Billboard); Carrie Underwood and Rascal Flatts version	50

==== Year-end charts ====
Chart (2005)	Position
US Country Songs (Billboard)	3

=== Certifications and sales ===
Region	Certification	Certified units/sales
United Kingdom (BPI)	Silver	200,000^{‡}
United States (RIAA)	7× Platinum	7,000,000^{‡}
^{‡} Sales+streaming figures based on certification alone.

== Selah version ==
"Bless the Broken Road"

Single by Selah with Melodie Crittenden

from the album Bless the Broken Road: The Duets Album
- Released: March 2006
- Genre: Contemporary Christian music
- Length: 4:10
- Label: Curb
- Songwriters: Marcus Hummon; Bobby Boyd; Jeff Hanna
- Producers: Allan Hall; Jason Kyle; Todd D. Smith

Selah singles chronology
"Bless the Broken Road" (2006)	"Hosanna" (2009)

Selah, a contemporary Christian music band, covered the song in 2006 on the album Bless the Broken Road: The Duets Album featuring a duet vocal from Crittenden. Also released as a single, Selah's version peaked at number five on the Hot Christian Songs charts.

=== Charts ===
Chart (2006)	Peak position
U.S. Billboard Hot Christian Songs	5

=== Accolades ===
In 2007, this version of the song was nominated for a Dove Award for Song of the Year at the 38th GMA Dove Awards.

== Film adaptation ==
A feature film based on the song, titled God Bless the Broken Road, began filming in 2015, and was originally announced to be released in 2016. The actual release was September 7, 2018.
