= Neil Thrasher =

American songwriter and singer

- Birth name: Joe Neil Thrasher Jr.
- Born: July 13, 1965 (age 59)
- Origin: Birmingham, Alabama, U.S.
- Genres: Country
- Occupation(s): Singer, songwriter
- Instrument(s): Vocals, guitar
- Years active: 1994–present
- Formerly of: Thrasher Shiver

Joe Neil Thrasher Jr. (born July 13, 1965) is an American country music singer and songwriter. Between 1995 and 1997, he and Kelly Shiver comprised the duo Thrasher Shiver, which recorded a studio album for Asylum Records in 1996 and charted two singles on the Billboard country charts in early 1997.

Although Thrasher Shiver has not been active since 1997, Thrasher has written several singles for other country music artists, such as Jason Aldean, Rascal Flatts, Kenny Chesney, Diamond Rio, and Montgomery Gentry. Thrasher has also received an ASCAP Songwriter of the Year award in 2004.

== Biography ==
Neil Thrasher was born in 1965 in Birmingham, Alabama. His father was a member of a gospel music band known as the Thrasher Brothers. The Thrasher Brothers were inducted into the Alabama music Hall of fame in 2005.

Although he had originally planned to play college football, he later switched his focus to singing and songwriting. In 1992 he met his future wife, Lana, who was running Major Bob Music publishing company that also managed Garth Brooks. Thrasher sang backing vocals on Brooks' 1990 album No Fences and wrote a single for Ricky Lynn Gregg in 1994. Eventually, the company's owner, Bob Doyle, introduced Thrasher to another singer-songwriter named Kelly Shiver. The two soon formed the duo Thrasher Shiver, which released one album in 1996 on Asylum Records. In addition, Thrasher co-wrote Diamond Rio's 1996 single "That's What I Get for Lovin' You" and Rhett Akins' 1997 single "Better Than It Used to Be".

Although Thrasher Shiver split up in 1997, both members continued to write songs, with Thrasher being the more prolific of the two. In 1999, Reba McEntire released "What Do You Say", one of Thrasher's compositions. The song reached Top 5 on the Billboard country music charts. Thrasher had minor success as a songwriter throughout the early 2000s, including low-charting singles for 3 of Hearts and Meredith Edwards, as well as Kenny Chesney's "I Lost It" and Jeff Carson's "Real Life (I Never Was the Same Again)."

Thrasher became more prolific in the mid-2000s, with Rascal Flatts releasing four of his songs as singles, including the Number One hits "Fast Cars and Freedom" and "Take Me There". The latter was co-written by Chesney, who also topped the country charts in late 2003-early 2004 with "There Goes My Life", another Thrasher co-write.

== List of singles composed by Neil Thrasher ==
- 3 of Hearts – "Love Is Enough"
- Rhett Akins – "Better Than It Used to Be"
- Jason Aldean – "Tattoos on This Town", "Fly Over States", "Night Train", "Rearview Town", "Try That in a Small Town"
- Bryan Austin – "Is It Just Me"
- Lee Brice – "She Ain't Right"
- Chris Cagle – "Never Ever Gone"
- Jeff Carson – "Real Life (I Never Was the Same Again)"
- Kenny Chesney – "I Lost It," "There Goes My Life"
- Kristy Lee Cook – "Wherever Love Goes"
- Billy Ray Cyrus – "Somebody Said a Prayer"
- Diamond Rio – "That's What I Get for Lovin' You," "Sweet Summer," "Wrinkles"
- Ronnie Dunn – "Ain't No Trucks in Texas"
- Meredith Edwards – "The Bird Song"
- Rascal Flatts – "I Melt," "Fast Cars and Freedom," "Take Me There," "Bob That Head," "Why Wait", "Banjo", "Changed"
- Ricky Lynn Gregg – "Get a Little Closer"
- Andy Griggs – "How Cool Is That," "This I Gotta See"
- Randy Houser – "How Country Feels", "Wherever Love Goes"
- Jackie Lee – "She Does"
- Brice Long – "It's Only Monday"
- Reba McEntire – "What Do You Say"," "Strange"
- Montgomery Gentry – "Some People Change"
- Marty Raybon – "Cracker Jack Diamond"
- Collin Raye – "Quitters"
- Thrasher Shiver – "Going Going Gone"
