= Wendell Mobley =

American country music songwriter

- Birth name: Wendell Lee Mobley
- Born: Celina, Ohio, United States
- Origin: Nashville, Tennessee
- Years active: 1994–present

Wendell Lee Mobley (born in Celina, Ohio) is an American country music songwriter. He has written No. 1 hits for Rascal Flatts and Kenny Chesney.

He began playing in local bands before moving to Nashville, Tennessee, where he found a job playing guitar for Jack Greene and Alabama. After having his songs recorded by Joe Diffie and Kenny Rogers, he became a full-time songwriter.

Mobley's first cut as a single was Alabama's "We Can't Love Like This Anymore" in 1994. Among his cuts are the number 1 singles "How Forever Feels" and "There Goes My Life" by Kenny Chesney; "Fast Cars and Freedom", "Take Me There" and "Banjo" by Rascal Flatts; and "How Country Feels" by Randy Houser.
