= Gary LeVox =

American vocalist (born 1970)

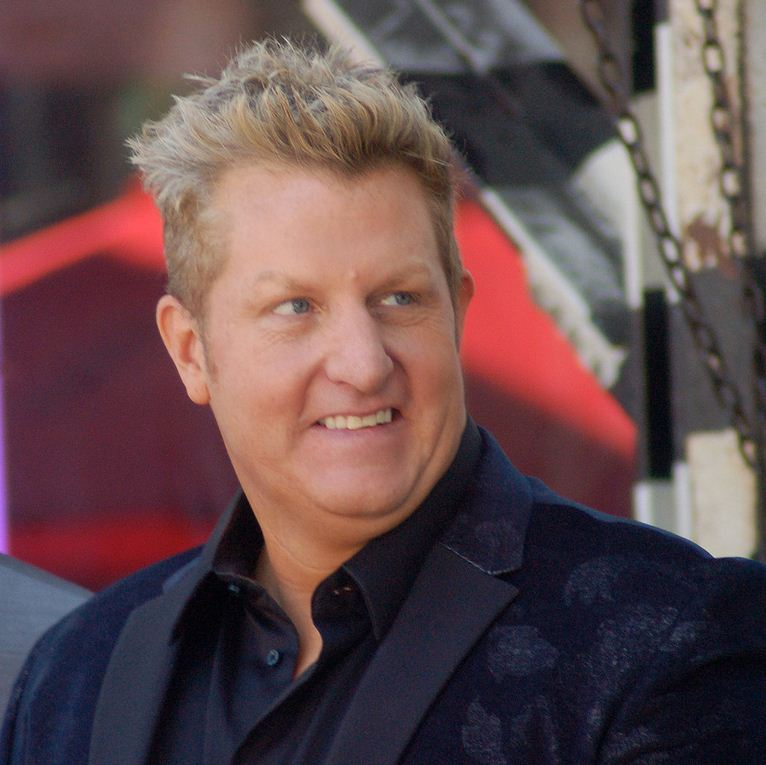
- LeVox in September 2012

Background information
- Born: Gary Wayne Vernon Jr. July 10, 1970 (age 56); Powell, Ohio, U.S.
- Genres: Country country rock country pop
- Occupations: Singer, songwriter
- Instruments: Vocals, guitar, drums, harmonica
- Years active: 1997–present
- Labels: Lyric Street, Big Machine
- Member of: Rascal Flatts
- Spouse: Tara Vernon (m. 1999)
- Website: rascalflatts.com

Gary LeVox (born Gary Wayne Vernon Jr., July 10, 1970) is an American singer and songwriter. He is best known for being the lead vocalist of the contemporary country music band Rascal Flatts, and his stage name was taken from the studio-console label for his lead vocal track.

== Biography ==
=== Early life ===
LeVox was born Gary Wayne Vernon Jr. on July 10, 1970, in Powell, Ohio, a suburb of Columbus. His mother is Judith (née Fuller) and his father is Gary Wayne Vernon Sr. (1951–2019). He has two younger brothers named Kevin and Geoffrey. LeVox's first musical performance was at the age of eight, in a play at his church. He graduated from Olentangy High School and is an alumnus of Ohio State University. Prompted by his cousin, LeVox moved to Nashville, Tennessee, in 1997.

=== Rascal Flatts ===
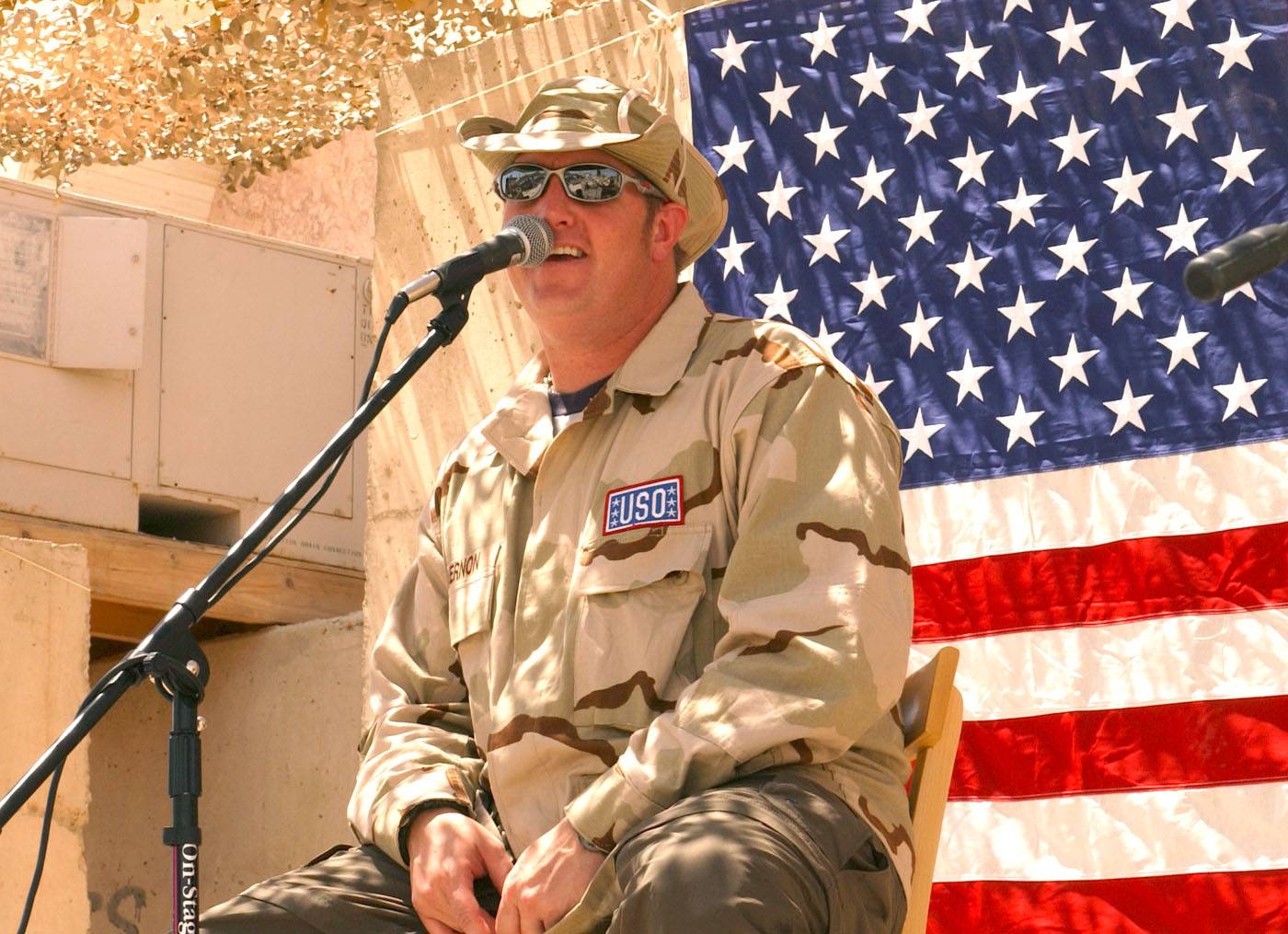
LeVox performing in 2005

LeVox and his second cousin, Jay DeMarcus, started out together in singer Chely Wright's band. When the regular guitarist was not available, Joe Don Rooney stepped in. The three men say they felt chemistry immediately and afterwards formed Rascal Flatts.

LeVox rejoined Rascal Flatts in 2024 for their reunion and subsequent revival.

=== Post-Rascal Flatts ===
The band disbanded in 2021, after which LeVox began releasing solo music. In May 2021, he released his first solo EP, One on One. This was followed in 2022 by a single titled "Get Down Like That" on Big Machine Records, the label to which Rascal Flatts was previously signed.

== Personal life ==
LeVox has been friends with Jamie Foxx since the mid-1990s, and Foxx made a guest appearance on the Rascal Flatts album Still Feels Good.

"We used to sit around for hours at Jamie’s house, singing and playing and having a good time...So when Jay and Joe and myself wrote this song, we thought it would be great to have him on it. I called him up just to say, ‘Hey, man, you’ve got to hear this song. I think you could really, really kill it.’ He said, ‘Tell you what. I’ll sing on your record if you guys will sing on mine.’ I said, ‘All right.’"

— Gary LeVox (2007)

LeVox was employed in his local burger bar from age 14 after which he started an AC/DC cover band with his close childhood friends.

LeVox has been married to Tara Vernon since May 1999. He says it was love at first sight when they met backstage at a gospel festival concert. "I knew at that moment that I was looking at my future wife," he said in a 2011 interview. "It was the weirdest thing ever." They have two daughters together, Brittany, born in 2000, and Brooklyn, born in 2004.

== Discography ==
- Rascal Flatts (2000)
- Melt (2002)
- Feels Like Today (2004)
- Me and My Gang (2006)
- Still Feels Good (2007)
- Unstoppable (2009)
- Nothing Like This (2010)
- Changed (2012)
- Rewind (2014)
- The Greatest Gift of All (2016)
- Back to Us (2017)
- Life Is a Highway: Refueled Duets (2025)
