= Rhythm and Roots Tour =

2016 concert tour by Rascal Flatts

Rhythm & Roots Tour
- Tour by Rascal Flatts
- Associated album: Rewind
- Start date: June 17, 2016
- End date: October 8, 2016
- Legs: 1
- No. of shows: 36

Rascal Flatts concert chronology
- Riot Tour (2015); Rhythm & Roots Tour (2016); Back To Us Tour (2018)

The Rhythm & Roots Tour was the fourteenth headlining concert tour by American country music trio Rascal Flatts. It began on June 17, 2016 in Charlotte, North Carolina and ended on October 8 of that year in Reading, Pennsylvania.

== Background ==
The tour was first announced on March 4, 2016. About the tour Jay DeMarcus says,

"It's really important to us that each year our shows are fresh and exciting for our fans,". "We put a lot of thought into how to do that this year and mixing it up in Vegas was really fun so we decided to continue with this new change of pace out on the road this summer, so we can share it with more of our fans. We're really excited to have such great support this year with Kelsea and Chris too, it's going to be a blast!"

== Concert synopsis ==
As the show begins the opening notes of "Summer Nights" can be heard behind a black curtain, then the curtains go up and the band is revealed. During "Rewind" there are video clips highlighting some of the groups best moments like when they met Muhammed Ali, Disney characters, and receiving a star on the Hollywood Walk of Fame.

=== Stage design ===
There are three video screens, the trio and keyboardist stand in front other tour band members who stand on risers.

== Opening acts ==
- Kelsea Ballerini
- Chris Lane
- Chase Bryant

== Setlist ==
1. "Summer Nights"
2. "I Like the Sound of That"
3. "Banjo"
4. "Come Wake Me Up"/"I Melt"/"I Won't Let Go"
5. "Life Is a Highway"
6. "Forever Young"
7. "Bless the Broken Road"
8. "Rewind"
9. "Fast Cars and Freedom"
10. "Purple Rain" (Prince cover)
11. "Love You Out Loud"
12. "My Wish"
13. "Take Me There"
14. "What Hurts the Most"
15. "Here's to You"
16. "Me and My Gang"

== Tour dates ==
Dates	City	Country	Venue	Opening acts
June 17, 2016	Charlotte	United States	PNC Music Pavilion	Kelsea Ballerini; Chris Lane
June 18, 2016	Raleigh	United States	Coastal Credit Union Music Park	Kelsea Ballerini; Chris Lane
June 24, 2016	Syracuse	United States	Lakeview Amphitheater	Kelsea Ballerini; Chris Lane
June 25, 2016	Cuyahoga Falls	United States	Blossom Music Center	Kelsea Ballerini; Chris Lane
June 26, 2016	Cincinnati	United States	Riverbend Music Center	Kelsea Ballerini; Chris Lane
July 7, 2016	Mountain View	United States	Shoreline Amphitheatre	Kelsea Ballerini; Chris Lane
July 8, 2016	Chula Vista	United States	Sleep Train Amphitheatre	Kelsea Ballerini; Chris Lane
July 9, 2016	Irvine	United States	Irvine Meadows Amphitheatre	Kelsea Ballerini; Chris Lane
July 15, 2016	Phoenix	United States	Ak-Chin Pavilion	Kelsea Ballerini; Chris Lane
July 16, 2016	Albuquerque	United States	Isleta Amphitheater	Kelsea Ballerini; Chris Lane
July 28, 2016	Maryland Heights	United States	Hollywood Casino Amphitheatre	Kelsea Ballerini; Chris Lane
July 29, 2016	Bonner Springs	United States	Providence Medical Center Amphitheater	Kelsea Ballerini; Chris Lane
July 30, 2016	Dallas	United States	Gexa Energy Pavilion	Kelsea Ballerini; Chris Lane
August 5, 2016 (Note: This concert is a part of the Mississippi Valley Fair.)	Davenport	United States	Mississippi Valley Fairgrounds	Kelsea Ballerini; Chris Lane
August 6, 2016 (Note: This concert is a part of the Wisconsin State Fair.)	West Allis	United States	Wisconsin State Fair Park	Kelsea Ballerini; Chris Lane
August 7, 2016	Tinely Park	United States	Hollywood Casino Amphitheatre	Kelsea Ballerini; Chris Lane
August 12, 2016	Mansfield	United States	Xfinity Center	Kelsea Ballerini; Chris Lane
August 13, 2016	Hartford	United States	Xfinity Theatre	Kelsea Ballerini; Chris Lane
August 14, 2016	Virginia Beach	United States	Veterans United Home Loans Amphitheater	Kelsea Ballerini; Chris Lane
August 18, 2016	Halifax	Canada	Scotiabank Centre	Kelsea Ballerini; Chris Lane
August 20, 2016 (Note: This concert is a part of the Eastbound Hoedown.)	Avondale	Canada	Eastbound Hoedown	Kelsea Ballerini; Chris Lane
August 27, 2016 (Note: This concert is a part of the Allen County Fair.)	Lima	United States	Allen County Fair	Kelsea Ballerini; Chris Lane
September 1, 2016	Wantagh	United States	Nikon at Jones Beach Theatre	Kelsea Ballerini; Chris Lane
September 2, 2016	Holmdel	United States	PNC Bank Arts Center	Kelsea Ballerini; Chris Lane
September 3, 2016 (Note: This concert is a part of the Champlain Valley Fair.)	Essex Junction	United States	Champlain Valley Exposition	Kelsea Ballerini; Chris Lane
September 4, 2016	Bangor	United States	Darling's Waterfront Pavilion	Kelsea Ballerini; Chris Lane
September 8, 2016	Camden	United States	BB&T Pavilion	Kelsea Ballerini; Chris Lane
September 9, 2016	Burgettstown	United States	First Niagara Pavilion	Kelsea Ballerini; Chris Lane
September 10, 2016	Bristow	United States	Jiffy Lube Live	Kelsea Ballerini; Chris Lane
September 15, 2016	Clarkston	United States	DTE Energy Music Theatre	Kelsea Ballerini; Chris Lane
September 16, 2016 (Note: This concert is a part of the Allegan County Fair.)	Allegan	United States	Allegan County Fair	Kelsea Ballerini; Chris Lane
September 17, 2016	Noblesville	United States	Klipsch Music Center	Kelsea Ballerini; Chris Lane
September 22, 2016	Jonesboro	United States	ASU Convocation Center	Chase Bryant
September 23, 2016	Tuscaloosa	United States	Tuscaloosa Amphitheater	Chase Bryant
September 24, 2016	Tallahassee	United States	Tallahassee Pavilion	Chase Bryant
October 7, 2016	University Park	United States	Bryce Jordan Center	Chase Bryant
October 8, 2016	Reading	United States	Santander Arena	Chase Bryant

List of festivals and fair

== Critical reception ==
Elisabeth Arriero, a correspondent for The Charlotte Observer says, "There's a reason why Rascal Flatts can still fill up venues like PNC Music Pavilino after 16 consecutive years on tour: They have this live performance bit down to a science without losing any of the enthusiasm or heart."
