= Rewind Tour =

2014 concert tour by Rascal Flatts

- Tour by Rascal Flatts
- Promotional poster for the tour
- Associated album: Rewind
- Start date: May 16, 2014
- End date: October 19, 2014
- Legs: 2
- No. of shows: 38

Rascal Flatts concert chronology
- Live & Loud Tour (2013); Rewind Tour (2014-15); Riot Tour (2015)

The Rewind Tour was the twelfth headlining concert tour by American country music trio Rascal Flatts, in support of their ninth studio album Rewind (2014). The tour began on May 16, 2014 in Maryland Heights, Missouri and ended on March 14, 2015 in Las Vegas, Nevada.

== Opening acts ==
- Sheryl Crow
- Gloriana
- Kellie Pickler
- The Swon Brothers

== Setlist ==
Average setlist for the tour:

1. "Payback"
2. "Why Wait"
3. "Here Comes Goodbye"
4. "Rewind"
5. "These Days"
6. "Stand"
7. "Fast Cars and Freedom"
8. "Bless the Broken Road"
9. "Banjo"
10. "Love You Out Loud"
11. "Happy" (Pharrell Williams cover)
12. "My Wish"
13. "Summer Nights"
14. Medley: "DJ Tonight"/"Hot in Here"/"Here's to You"
15. "Life Is a Highway"

Encore

17. "Kickstart My Heart" (Mötley Crüe cover)
18. "Me and My Gang"

== Tour dates ==
Date	City	Country	Venue	Opening acts
North America Leg 1
May 16, 2014	Maryland Heights	United States	Verizon Wireless Amphitheater	Sheryl Crow; Gloriana
May 17, 2014	Noblesville	United States	Klipsch Music Center	Sheryl Crow; Gloriana
May 30, 2014	Wantagh	United States	Nikon at Jones Beach Theatre	Sheryl Crow; Gloriana
May 31, 2014	Hartford	United States	Xfinity Theatre	Sheryl Crow; Gloriana
June 13, 2014 ^{[A]}	Winstead	United States	Winstock Country Music Festival	Sheryl Crow; Gloriana
June 14, 2014	Tinley Park	United States	First Midwest Bank Amphitheatre	Sheryl Crow; Gloriana
June 15, 2014	Bonner Springs	United States	Cricket Wireless Amphitheatre	Sheryl Crow; Gloriana
June 21, 2014	Mansfield	United States	Xfinity Center	Sheryl Crow; Gloriana
June 22, 2014	Holmdel	United States	PNC Bank Arts Center	Sheryl Crow; Gloriana
June 29, 2014 ^{[B]}	Dauphin	Canada	Dauphin's Country Fest	Sheryl Crow; Gloriana
July 11, 2014	The Woodlands	United States	Cynthia Woods Mitchell Pavilion	Sheryl Crow; Gloriana
July 12, 2014	Dallas	United States	Gexa Energy Pavilion	Sheryl Crow; Gloriana
July 16, 2014	Englewood	United States	Fiddler's Green Amphitheatre	Sheryl Crow; Gloriana
July 17, 2014	Tooele	United States	Desert Park Recreational Center	Sheryl Crow; Gloriana
July 25, 2014	Raleigh	United States	Walnut Creek Amphitheatre	Sheryl Crow; Gloriana
July 26, 2014	Charlotte	United States	PNC Music Pavilion	Sheryl Crow; Gloriana
July 27, 2014	Virginia Beach	United States	Farm Bureau Live	Sheryl Crow; Gloriana
August 1, 2014	Cuyahoga Falls	United States	Blossom Music Center	Sheryl Crow; Gloriana
August 2, 2014	Bristow	United States	Jiffy Lube Live	Sheryl Crow; Gloriana
August 3, 2014	Saratoga Springs	United States	Saratoga Performing Arts Center	Sheryl Crow; Gloriana
August 15, 2014	Phoenix	United States	Ak-Chin Pavilion	Sheryl Crow; Gloriana
August 16, 2014	San Bernardino	United States	San Manuel Amphitheater	Sheryl Crow; Gloriana
August 17, 2014	Chula Vista	United States	Sleep Train Amphitheatre	Sheryl Crow; Gloriana
August 21, 2014	Fresno	United States	Save Mart Center	Sheryl Crow; Gloriana
August 23, 2014	Mountain View	United States	Shoreline Amphitheatre	Sheryl Crow; Gloriana
August 24, 2014	Stateline	United States	Harveys Outdoor Arena	Sheryl Crow; Gloriana
August 27, 2014	Wheatland	United States	Sleep Train Amphitheatre	Sheryl Crow; Gloriana
September 4, 2014	Darien Center	United States	Darien Lake PAC	Sheryl Crow; Gloriana
September 5, 2014	Cincinnati	United States	Riverbend Music Center	Sheryl Crow; Gloriana
September 6, 2014	Burgettstown	United States	First Niagara Pavilion	Sheryl Crow; Gloriana
September 11, 2014	Atlanta	United States	Aaron's Amphitheatre	Sheryl Crow; Gloriana
September 12, 2014	Tampa	United States	MidFlorida Credit Union Amphitheatre	Sheryl Crow; Gloriana
September 13, 2014	West Palm Beach	United States	Cruzan Amphitheatre	Sheryl Crow; Gloriana
September 20, 2014	Toronto	Canada	Molson Canadian Amphitheatre	Sheryl Crow; Gloriana
September 21, 2014	Clarkston	United States	DTE Energy Music Theatre	Sheryl Crow; Gloriana
September 27, 2014	Richmond	United States	Washington Redskins Training Center	Kellie Pickler
October 10, 2014	Newark	United States	Prudential Center	The Swon Brothers
October 11, 2014	Atlantic City	United States	Etess Arena	Gloriana
October 19, 2014 ^{[C]}	Arlington	United States	AT&T Stadium	—N/a

notes
^{A} This concert is a part of the Winstock Country Music Festival.
^{B} This concert is a part of Dauphin's Country Festival.
^{C} This concert is a part of the Carnival Live Concert Series

=== Canceled shows ===
Date	City	Country	Venue
July 10, 2014	Oklahoma City	United States	OKC Downtown Airpark
August 7, 2014	Nampa	United States	Idaho Center Amphitheater
August 8, 2014	Airway Heights	United States	Northern Quest Casino
August 9, 2014	Mission	Canada	Mission Raceway Park
September 26, 2014	Allentown	United States	PPL Center

== Box office score data ==
Venue	City	Tickets sold / available	Gross revenue
Nikon at Jones Beach	Wantagh	13,449 / 13,449	$521,171
XFINITY Theatre	Hartford	19,223 / 21,000	$617,595
First Midwest Bank Amphitheatre	Tinley Park	21,447 / 24,000	$697,448
Cricket Wireless Amphitheatee	Bonner Springs	12,449 / 18,000	$429,998
Xfinity Center	Mansfield	19,557 / 19,557	$697,338
PNC Bank Arts Center	Holmdel	17,225 / 17,225	$617,595
Austin360	Austin	11,324 / 13,000	$465,338
Cythia Woods Mitchell Pavilion	The Woodlands	13,499 / 16,000	$476,330
Gexa Energy Pavilion	Dallas	18,965 / 20,000	$567,555
San Manuel Amphitheater	Devore	10,581 / 13,000	$597,446
Blossom Music Center	Cuyahoga Falls	20,434 / 20,434	$655,927
Sleep Train Amphitheatre	Chula Vista	14,922 / 19,000	$464,339
Save Mart Center	Fresno	8,275 / 9,930	$315,633
Shoreline Amphitheatre	Mountain View	18,967 / 21,000	$596,335
Harveys Outdoor Arena	Stateline	4,306 / 6,500	$302,104
Sleep Train Amphitheatre	Wheatland	15,444 / 19,000	$505,651
Darien Lake	Darien	12,994 / 19,000	$439,449
Riverbend Music Center	Cincinnati	17,199 / 19,000	$521,335
First Niagara Pavilion	Burgettstown	17,499 / 21,000	$512,336
Pryor City Park	Pryor	9,121 / 10,335	$309,701
TOTAL		296,759 / 339,995	$9,256,695
