= Riot Tour =

2015 concert tour by Rascal Flatts

- Tour by Rascal Flatts
- Promotional poster for the tour
- Associated album: Rewind
- Start date: May 5, 2015
- End date: November 7, 2015
- Legs: 1
- No. of shows: 43
- Box office: $18.7 million

Rascal Flatts concert chronology
- Rewind Tour (2014); Riot Tour (2015); Rhythm and Roots Tour (2016)

The Riot Tour was the thirteenth headlining concert tour by American country music trio Rascal Flatts, in support of their ninth studio album Rewind (2014). The tour began May 5, 2015 in Cozumel, Mexico and ended on November 7 of that year in Albuquerque, New Mexico. It grossed over $18.7 million and was ranked fifty-seventh on Pollstar's Year End list on the Top 200 North American Tours of 2015.

== Background ==
Rascal Flatts first announced the tour on January 20, 2015. The tour follows their Las Vegas spring residency.

== Opening acts ==
- Lauren Alaina
- Seth Alley
- Chase Bryant
- Chris Janson
- Scotty McCreery
- Ashley Monroe
- RaeLynn
- Mo Pitney

== Setlist ==
Average setlist for the tour:

1. "Stand"
2. "Me and My Gang"
3. "Take Me to Church" (Hozier cover)
4. "What Hurts the Most"/"To Love Someday" (Bee Gees cover)
5. "Love You Out Loud"
6. "Why Wait"
7. "Riot"
8. "Fast Cars and Freedom"
9. "Easy"
10. "These Days"
11. "Mayberry"
12. "I'm Movin' On"
13. "Prayin' for Daylight"
14. "Summer Nights"
15. "My Wish"
16. "She's Leaving"
17. "Rewind"
18. "Take Me There"
19. "Bless the Broken Road"/"Open Arms" (Journey cover)
20. "Banjo"

Encore

22. "Here's to You"
23. "Life is a Highway" (Tom Cochrane cover)

== Tour dates ==
Date	City	Country	Venue	Opening acts	Attendance	Gross revenue
North America
May 5, 2015	Cozumel Cruise departs from Tampa	Mexico	Carnival Cruise Lines	The Band Perry; Lauren Alaina	—	—
May 6, 2015	Cozumel Cruise departs from Miami	Mexico	Carnival Cruise Lines	The Band Perry; Lauren Alaina	—	—
May 7, 2015	Cozumel Cruise departs from Miami	Mexico	Carnival Cruise Lines	The Band Perry; Lauren Alaina	—	—
May 17, 2015 ^{[A]}	Atlanta	United States	KSU Sports and Entertainment Park	The Band Perry; Lauren Alaina	—	—
May 29, 2015	Maryland Heights	United States	Hollywood Casino Amphitheatre	Scotty McCreery; Ashley Monroe	14,228 / 19,000	$475,558
May 30, 2015	Noblesville	United States	Klipsch Music Center	Scotty McCreery; Ashley Monroe	15,139 / 21,000	$467,669
June 5, 2015 ^{[B]}	Myrtle Beach	United States	Carolina Country Music Festival	—	—	—
June 6, 2015 ^{[C]}	Detroit	United States	West Riverfront Park	Lauren Alaina	—	—
June 12, 2015	Virginia Beach	United States	Farm Bureau Live	Scotty McCreery; RaeLynn	13,497 / 19,000	$429,449
June 13, 2015	Bristow	United States	Jiffy Lube Live	Scotty McCreery; RaeLynn	14,937 / 19,000	$479,833
June 14, 2015	Hartford	United States	Xfinity Theatre	Scotty McCreery; RaeLynn	19,887 / 21,000	$549,863
June 20, 2015 ^{[D]}	Columbus	United States	Ohio Stadium	—	—	—
July 4, 2015 ^{[G]}	Indianapolis	United States	Indianapolis Motor Speedway	Lauren Alaina	—	—
July 11, 2015	West Palm Beach	United States	Coral Sky Amphitheater	Scotty McCreery; RaeLynn	15,756 / 19,000	$468,557
July 12, 2015	Tampa	United States	MidFlorida Credit Union Amphitheatre	Scotty McCreery; RaeLynn	13,856 / 19,000	$435,449
July 24, 2015	Burgettstown	United States	First Niagara Pavilion	Scotty McCreery; RaeLynn	13,229 / 19,000	$428,499
July 25, 2015	Charlotte	United States	PNC Music Pavilion	Scotty McCreery; RaeLynn	15,835 / 19,000	$469,661
July 26, 2015	Raleigh	United States	Walnut Creek Amphitheatre	Scotty McCreery; RaeLynn	18,345 / 19,000	$579,446
July 31, 2015	Holmdel	United States	PNC Bank Arts Center	Scotty McCreery; RaeLynn	15,489 / 16,000	$597,449
August 1, 2015	Camden	United States	Susquehanna Bank Center	Scotty McCreery; RaeLynn	18,550 / 21,000	$514,880
August 2, 2015	Mansfield	United States	Xfinity Center	Scotty McCreery; RaeLynn	18,662 / 21,000	$540,105
August 8, 2015	Dallas	United States	Gexa Energy Pavilion	Scotty McCreery; Seth Alley	17,559 / 19,000	$548,339
August 18, 2015 ^{[E]}	Springfield	United States	Illinois State Fair	Scotty McCreery; RaeLynn	—	—
August 20, 2015	Atlantic City	United States	Atlantic City Beach	Ashley Monroe; Lauren Alaina	—	—
August 21, 2015	Gilford	United States	Bank of New Hampshire Pavilion	Scotty McCreery	5,558 / 7,825	$402,053
August 27, 2015	Toronto	Canada	Molson Amphitheatre	Scotty McCreery; Ashley Monroe; RaeLynn	13,675 / 16,000	$375,056
August 28, 2015	Cuyahoga Falls	United States	Blossom Music Center	Scotty McCreery; Ashley Monroe; RaeLynn	20,978 / 20,978	$629,476
August 29, 2015	Darien	United States	Darien Lake PAC	Scotty McCreery; Ashley Monroe; RaeLynn	14,969 / 19,000	$467,559
August 30, 2015	Bethel	United States	Bethel Woods Center for the Arts	Scotty McCreery; Ashley Monroe; RaeLynn	12,449 / 19,000	$479,331
September 12, 2015	Farmingville	United States	Pennysaver Amphitheater	Ashley Monroe	—	—
September 18, 2015	Tinley Park	United States	First Midwest Bank Amphitheatre	Scotty McCreery; Ashley Monroe	18,309 / 21, 000	$516,744
September 19, 2015	Cincinnati	United States	Riverbend Music Center	Scotty McCreery; RaeLynn	13,543 / 19,000	$437,398
September 24, 2015	Reno	United States	Reno Events Center	—	—	—
September 25, 2015	Pala	United States	Pala Casino Events Center	—	—	—
September 26, 2015	Laughlin	United States	Laughlin Event Center	—	—	—
October 1, 2015	Albuquerque	United States	Isleta Amphitheater	Scotty McCreery; RaeLynn	14,377 / 17,000	$438,115
October 2, 2015	Phoenix	United States	Ak-Chin Pavilion	Scotty McCreery; RaeLynn	14,499 / 19,000	$439,449
October 3, 2015	Irvine	United States	Verizon Wireless Amphitheatre	Scotty McCreery; RaeLynn	14,345 / 15,000	$528,559
October 4, 2015	Mountain View	United States	Shoreline Amphitheater	Scotty McCreery; RaeLynn	17,987 / 19,000	$575,477
October 10, 2015	Uncasville	United States	Mohegan Sun Arena	Mo Pitney	—	—
October 17, 2015	Perry	United States	Georgia International Fairgrounds	—	—	—
October 23, 2015	Kinder	United States	Coushatta Casino Events Center	—	—	—
November 7, 2015^{[H]}	Alpharetta	United States	Verizon Wireless Amphitheatre	Chase Bryant; Chris Janson	—	—
Total					385,658 / 463,803 (83%)	$12,273,974

List of festivals and fairs
^{A} This concert is a part of the Shaky Boots Festival.
^{B} This concert is a part of the Carolina Country Music Festival.
^{C} This concert is a part of the 99.5 WYCD Downtown Hoedown.
^{D} This concert is a part of the Buckeye Country Superfest.
^{E} This concert is a part of the Illinois State Fair.
^{F} This concert is a part of the Country Rock & Rewind Festival.
^{G} This concert is a part of the Rolling Stones – Zip Code Tour.
^{H} This Concert is a part of the KICKS 101.5 Country Fair & Tim McGraw's Shotgun Rider Tour

== Cancelled Shows ==
Date	City	Venue	Reason
August 22, 2015	Hershey	Hersheypark Stadium	Scheduling conflict
