= Yours If You Want It =

Single by Rascal Flatts

from the album Back to Us
- Released: January 9, 2017
- Genre: Country rock
- Length: 3:28
- Label: Big Machine
- Songwriters: Andrew Dorff; Jonathan Singleton
- Producer: Rascal Flatts

Rascal Flatts singles chronology
"I Like the Sound of That" (2015)	"Yours If You Want It" (2017)	"Back to Us" (2017)

"Yours If You Want It" is a song recorded by American country music group Rascal Flatts. It was released in January 2017 as the first single from their tenth studio album, Back to Us (2017). The song was written by Andrew Dorff and Jonathan Singleton.

== History ==
Rascal Flatts bassist Jay DeMarcus noted that the song was co-written by Andrew Dorff, who died at age 40 shortly before the song was released. He told Rolling Stone that, “We've been working really hard, and we're very proud of this track. What’s more, the late Andrew Dorff is a writer on it, and we are so honored to be a small part of making sure his legacy lives on. We have a special angel watching over it, for sure.”

== Music video ==
The music video was directed by William Zabka, starred Kevin Farley and Kristy Swanson, and premiered on CMT, GAC and Vevo in April 2017. Zabka previously directed Rascal Flatts' music video for "Why Wait". The video was nominated for Group Video of the Year at the 2018 CMT Music Awards.

== Critical reception ==
Billy Dukes of Taste of Country reviewed the song with favor, saying that "The production of 'Yours If You Want It' is as important as LeVox’s sterling vocals. Every instrument and backing vocal is razor sharp, yet there's no phony shine that often accompanies a heavily produced track. Visit Jay DeMarcus and Joe Don Rooney's simple and well-balanced backing vocals for an example." Matt Bjorke of Roughstock was also favorable, comparing the sound favorably to the band's earlier songs such as "Prayin' for Daylight" while noting the "modern and fresh" production.

== Other versions ==
Rascal Flatts re-recorded the song with Jordan Davis on their 2025 album Life Is a Highway: Refueled Duets.

== Commercial performance ==
The song has sold 88,000 copies in the United States as of June 2017.

== Charts ==
For the week ending August 5, 2017, the song became the group's fourteenth and final number one single on Billboard Country Airplay. Following previous single "I Like the Sound of That," this marked the first time since 2009 (with "Here" and "Here Comes Goodbye") that the group achieved consecutive number one hits on the Country Airplay chart.

Chart (2017)	Peak position
Canada Country (Billboard)	7
US Billboard Hot 100	71
US Country Airplay (Billboard)	1
US Hot Country Songs (Billboard)	13

=== Year-end charts ===
Chart (2017)	Position
Canada Country (Billboard)	7
US Country Airplay (Billboard)	13
US Hot Country Songs (Billboard)	33

== Certifications ==
Region	Certification	Certified units/sales
United States (RIAA)	Platinum	1,000,000^{‡}
^{‡} Sales+streaming figures based on certification alone.
