= East to West (duo) =

US contemporary Christian music duo

- Origin: Cleveland, Tennessee
- Genre: Christian
- Years active: 1993–1997
- Label: Benson
- Past members: Neal Coomer; Jay DeMarcus

East to West was a Contemporary Christian music duo from Cleveland, Tennessee, formed in 1993.

== Background ==
Neal Coomer and Jay DeMarcus met in Cleveland, Tennessee, at Lee College (now Lee University) and decided to form a Christian pop group along the lines of Level 42 or Go West. They released two albums, East to West in 1993 and North of the Sky, in 1995, which hit No. 16 on Billboard's Top Christian Albums chart that same year. The group toured in the United States with Al Denson and 4Him before breaking up in 1997. DeMarcus later formed a country music group Rascal Flatts with Gary LeVox and Joe Don Rooney.

The group's Christian radio hits included "Welcome to the Next Level" (#3, 1994), "Prince of Peace" (#1, 1994), "Hungry for You" (#3, 1995), "Heart on the Line" (#16, 1995), "This Time Around" (#5, 1995), "Still in Love" (#9, 1995), "Live Like I'm Leaving" (#19, 1996), and "Talk to Me" (#15, 1996).

== Discography ==
- East to West (Benson Records, 1993)
- North of the Sky (Benson, 1995)
