= I Dare You (Rascal Flatts and Jonas Brothers song) =

2025 single by Rascal Flatts and Jonas Brothers

Single by Rascal Flatts and Jonas Brothers

from the album Life Is a Highway: Refueled Duets
- Released: January 31, 2025
- Genre: Country pop
- Length: 3:48
- Label: Big Machine
- Songwriters: Nicholas Jonas; Shay Mooney; Dewain Whitmore Jr.; Tommy English
- Producers: Jay DeMarcus; Dann Huff; Tommy English; Jeremy Hatcher

Rascal Flatts singles chronology
"How They Remember You" (2020)	"I Dare You" (2025)

Jonas Brothers singles chronology
"Slow Motion" (2025)	"I Dare You" (2025)	"Love Me to Heaven" (2025)

Lyric video
- "I Dare You" on YouTube

"I Dare You" is a song by American country music band Rascal Flatts and American group Jonas Brothers. It was released on January 31, 2025, as the lead single from Rascal Flatts' eleventh studio album, Life Is a Highway: Refueled Duets. The song was written by Nick Jonas from the Jonas Brothers, Shay Mooney from Dan + Shay, Dewain Whitmore Jr., and Tommy English, with the latter having produced it alongside Rascal Flatts' bass guitarist Jay DeMarcus, Dann Huff, and Jeremy Hatcher. A country pop song, it serves as Rascal Flatts' first release following their return from a four-year-long hiatus that started in 2021. Gary LeVox, Nick and Joe Jonas serve as the track's lead vocalists.

== Background ==
In a press release, Jay DeMarcus spoke about the song:

We're so excited to kick off this next chapter of Rascal Flatts with this single, working with Kevin, Joe and Nick [Jonas] is such a blast, they're class acts. I think this song fits perfectly into our catalogue while also showing off something new and exciting, and we can't wait to share it with our fans on the road!

== Composition and lyrics ==
"I Dare You" is a song that primarily touches on issues of love and heartbreak. The narrator in the lyrics is courting a woman to pursue a relationship with him, despite her apprehension due to her previous failed relationship attempts. The lyrics "I dare you, I dare you to love somebody like me" are presented to the woman in a challenging but motivating context. The first verse and chorus feature lead vocals from Gary LeVox, with bassist Jay DeMarcus and guitarist Joe Don Rooney providing backing vocals and harmonies. Nick Jonas sings the second verse, with his brother Joe Jonas singing the second chorus. LeVox and the brothers trade vocal duties throughout the bridge, with all members of both bands joining together to sing the closing chorus of the song.

== Credits and personnel ==
- Rascal Flatts
  - Gary LeVox – lead vocals
  - Jay DeMarcus – bass guitar, background vocals, production
  - Joe Don Rooney – lead guitar, electric guitar, background vocals
- Jonas Brothers
  - Nick Jonas – lead vocals, background vocals, keyboard, songwriting
  - Joe Jonas – lead vocals, background vocals
  - Kevin Jonas – lead guitar
- Shay Mooney – songwriting, electric guitar
- Dewain Whitmore Jr. – songwriting
- Tommy English – songwriting, production, keyboard, additional engineering
- Dann Huff – mandolin, bouzouki, electric guitar, production
- Jeremy Hatcher – production, programming, additional engineer
- Ilya Toshinskiy – acoustic guitar
- Rob McNelley – electric guitar
- Paul Franklin – steel guitar
- Jerry Roe – drum kit
- Chris Small – digital editing engineering
- David Huff – programming, digital editing engineering
- Mike Griffith – production coordinator
- Sean Moffitt – mixing
- Jase Keithley – mixing, second engineer
- Joe LaPorta – mastering
- Drew Bollman – recording
- Andrew Boullianne – recording, second engineering
- Austin Brown – recording, second engineering
- Derek Bason – additional engineering
- Sean Giovanni – additional engineering

== Charts ==
Chart performance for "I Dare You"
Chart (2025–2026)	Peak position
Canada Country (Billboard)	44
New Zealand Hot Singles (RMNZ)	26
US Bubbling Under Hot 100 (Billboard)	23
US Country Airplay (Billboard)	13
US Hot Country Songs (Billboard)	31
