= Riot (Rascal Flatts song) =

Single by Rascal Flatts

from the album Rewind
- Released: November 24, 2014
- Genre: Country pop
- Length: 3:50 (album version); 3:31 (radio edit)
- Label: Big Machine
- Songwriters: Jaron Boyer; Sara Haze
- Producer: Rascal Flatts

Rascal Flatts singles chronology
"Payback" (2014)	"Riot" (2014)	"I Like the Sound of That" (2015)

"Riot" is a song written by Jaron Boyer and Sara Haze, and recorded by American country music group Rascal Flatts as the third single from their ninth studio album Rewind (2014).

== Content ==
The song is a "pleading ballad replete with piano, strings and Gary LeVox's tender tenor and gentle vibrato". In it, the narrator pleads that his lover not leave him, saying that "there would be a riot" should she do so.

== Critical reception ==
Giving it an "A", Tammy Ragusa of Country Weekly wrote that "A well-written lyric…gives a simple twist as Gary, Jay DeMarcus and Joe Don Rooney add their full band and harmonies in the verses and soar through the choruses, building to a crescendo that will leave you breathless when it drops back to just Gary's ethereal vocal, piano and strings." Taste of Country also favorably reviewed the song, saying that "Sonically, ‘Riot’ is complex and beautiful, playing to the strengths of each band member perfectly ... The guitar riffs and crescendoing instrumentation create a soaring sound, while the soft cello underneath provides the foundation for a track that will play just as well in intimate acoustic settings as it will in the huge arenas Rascal Flatts play on a regular basis."

== Music video ==
The music video was directed by Brian Lazzaro and premiered in April 2015.

== Chart performance ==
The song has sold 201,000 copies in the US as of August 2015.

Chart (2014–2015)	Peak position
US Bubbling Under Hot 100 (Billboard)	2
US Country Airplay (Billboard)	20
US Hot Country Songs (Billboard)	27

=== Year-end charts ===
Chart (2015)	Position
US Country Airplay (Billboard)	78
US Hot Country Songs (Billboard)	76
