= Back to Us (disambiguation) =

Back to Us is an album by Rascal Flatts.

Back to Us may also refer to:

- "Back to Us" (Rascal Flatts song)
- "Back to Us" (Keenan Cahill song)
- "Back to Us" (Don Diablo song)
