= Jim Riley (drummer) =

American musician

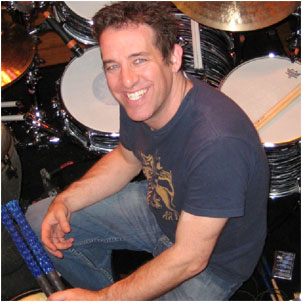
- Occupations: Musician; educator; author
- Known for: Drummer for the band Rascal Flatts
- Website: jimrileymusic.com

Jim Riley is an American musician and the drummer for the country band Rascal Flatts. He regularly teaches drums at Belmont University’s School of Music and has also performed in several awards shows.

== Career ==
Riley attended the University of North Texas, graduating with a degree in music education. He is sponsored by Ludwig, Sabian, Remo, Gibraltar, Latin Percussion, Vater, LP Roland, Shure and Innovative percussion.

In 2010, Riley authored a music instruction book Song Charting Made Easy as an introduction to the music notation system called Nashville Number System.

Riley was voted "Best Country Drummer" by Modern Drummer magazine in 2017.

== Credits ==
- The Grammy Awards
- The Tonight Show With Jay Leno
- The Late Show with David Letterman
- Dick Clark’s Rockin’ New Years Eve
- D1 football player
