= Life Is a Highway: Refueled Duets =

Studio album by Rascal Flatts
- Released: June 6, 2025
- Genre: Country
- Length: 38:17
- Label: Big Machine
- Producers: Jay DeMarcus; Tommy English; Jeremy Hatcher; Dann Huff

Rascal Flatts chronology
Twenty Years of Rascal Flatts: The Greatest Hits (2020)	Life Is a Highway: Refueled Duets (2025)

Singles from Life Is a Highway: Refueled Duets
- 1. "I Dare You" Released: January 31, 2025

Life Is a Highway: Refueled Duets is the eleventh studio album by American country music trio Rascal Flatts. It was released on June 6, 2025, through Big Machine Records. This is their first studio album in eight years and first since their breakup in 2021. In honor of their 25th anniversary, the album features nine re-recordings of some of their past hits with nine other artists. The album also features a new song, "I Dare You" featuring the Jonas Brothers, which was released as the lead single on January 31, 2025.

== Background ==
In January 2020, Rascal Flatts announced a farewell tour to celebrate their 20th anniversary. The tour subsequently was canceled due to the COVID-19 pandemic, and the group disbanded unceremoniously thereafter. In October 2021, Gary LeVox confirmed the band's breakup. In October 2024, the band announced that they would reunite to celebrate their 25th anniversary with a tour in 2025. In January 2025, Rascal Flatts said that they were working on new music, and on January 31, released a new single, "I Dare You" featuring the Jonas Brothers. On March 6, 2025, they announced the album. According to Joe Don Rooney, the project took about five years.

To celebrate their 25th anniversary, the album also features nine re-recordings of some of their past hits. Artists featured on the re-recordings are Blake Shelton, Jason Aldean, Carly Pearce, Kelly Clarkson, Backstreet Boys, Brandon Lake, Lzzy Hale, Ashley Cooke, and Jordan Davis.

== Critical reception ==
Professional ratings
Review scores
Source	Rating
Entertainment Focus	4/0 stars

James Daykin of Entertainment Focus gave the album four out of five stars. He wrote, "Refueled is a bold, celebratory reimagining of the band's storied back catalogue", and "The result is a fascinating blend of nostalgia and innovation, a project that breathes fresh life into well-worn fan favourites while showcasing the timelessness of band's songwriting."

== Composition ==
The first track, "I Dare You", is a new original song featuring the Jonas Brothers. Written by Nick Jonas, Shay Mooney, Dewain Whitmore Jr., and Tommy English, it is described as a country pop song. It was produced by English, Jay DeMarcus, Dann Huff, and Jeremy Hatcher. The song is about love and heartbreak. The last track, "I'm Movin' On" features Kelly Clarkson. Produced by DeMarcus, Clarkson is the featured lead on the song until the bridge when Gary LeVox takes over. Rascal Flatts sings harmony all throughout the song.

== Release and promotion ==
Life Is a Highway: Refueled Duets was released on June 6, 2025, by Big Machine Records. The album is being supported by the Life Is a Highway Tour. At the 60th Academy of Country Music Awards Rascal Flatts performed "I Dare You", then performed "What Hurts the Most" and "Life is a Highway" with the Backstreet Boys.

=== Singles ===
"I Dare You" featuring the Jonas Brothers was released as the album's lead single on January 31, 2025. The song has reached number 24 on the US Country Airplay chart, and number 31 on the US Hot Country Songs chart.

"I'm Movin' On" featuring Kelly Clarkson was released as a promotional single on March 14, 2025.

"What Hurts The Most" featuring the Backstreet Boys was released as a promotional single on May 2, 2025.

== Track listing ==
Life Is a Highway: Refueled Duets track listing
No.	Title	Writer(s)	Producer(s)	Length
1.	"I Dare You" (with Jonas Brothers)	Nick Jonas; Tommy English; Shay Mooney; Dewain Whitmore Jr.	Jay DeMarcus; Dann Huff; Jeremy Hatcher; English; Charlie Pennachio^{[v]}	3:48
2.	"Fast Cars and Freedom" (with Jason Aldean)	Gary LeVox; Wendell Mobley; Neil Thrasher	DeMarcus	4:14
3.	"My Wish" (with Carly Pearce)	Jeffrey Steele; Steve Robson	DeMarcus; Huff; Pennachio^{[v]}	4:14
4.	"Mayberry" (with Blake Shelton)	Arlos Smith	DeMarcus	3:49
5.	"Stand" (with Brandon Lake)	Blair Daly; Danny Orton	DeMarcus; Huff; Pennachio^{[v]}	3:30
6.	"Summer Nights" (with Ashley Cooke)	LeVox; Brett James; Busbee	DeMarcus; Huff; Pennachio^{[v]}	3:40
7.	"What Hurts the Most" (with Backstreet Boys)	Steele; Robson	DeMarcus	3:31
8.	"Yours If You Want It" (with Jordan Davis)	Andrew Dorff; Jonathan Singleton	DeMarcus; Huff; Pennachio^{[v]}	3:19
9.	"Life Is a Highway" (with Lzzy Hale)	Tom Cochrane	DeMarcus; Huff; Pennachio^{[v]}	4:25
10.	"I'm Movin' On" (with Kelly Clarkson)	Phillip White; David Vincent Williams	DeMarcus; Jason Halbert^{[v]}	3:44
Total length:				38:17

=== Note ===
- ^{^[v]} signifies a vocal producer

== Personnel ==
Rascal Flatts

- Jay DeMarcus – background vocals (1–6, 8, 10), bass guitar (1, 3, 5, 6, 8, 9), keyboards (2), programming (7, 10); acoustic guitar, electric guitar, mandolin, piano, synth bass (10)
- Gary LeVox – lead vocals (all tracks), background vocals (2, 4, 6)
- Joe Don Rooney – background vocals (1–6, 8, 10), electric guitar (1, 3, 5–9)

Vocals

- Jason Aldean – lead vocals (2)
- Backstreet Boys – background vocals, lead vocals (7)
- Kelly Clarkson – lead vocals (10)
- Ashley Cooke – lead vocals (6)
- Jordan Davis – lead vocals (8)
- Lzzy Hale – background vocals, lead vocals (9)
- Joe Jonas – background vocals, lead vocals (1)
- Nick Jonas – background vocals, lead vocals (1)
- Brandon Lake – lead vocals (5)
- Carly Pearce – lead vocals (3)
- Blake Shelton – lead vocals (4)

Additional musicians

- Kurt Allison – electric guitar (2)
- Tom Bukovac – electric guitar (4)
- Dave Cohen – keyboards (4)
- Kris Donegan – electric guitar (3, 6, 9)
- David Dorn – keyboards (5)
- Tommy English – keyboards (1)
- Jenee Fleenor – fiddle (3, 6)
- Paul Franklin – steel guitar (1, 6)
- Lzzy Hale – electric guitar (9)
- Dann Huff – electric guitar (1, 5, 8); bouzouki, mandolin (1); acoustic guitar (6)
- Evan Hutchings – drums (3)
- Mike Johnson – steel guitar (2)
- Kevin Jonas – electric guitar (1)
- Nick Jonas – keyboards (1)
- Charlie Judge – keyboards (1, 3, 5, 6, 8), accordion (3)
- Tully Kennedy – bass guitar (2)
- Rob McNelley – electric guitar (1, 8, 9)
- Shay Mooney – electric guitar (1)
- Danny Rader – acoustic guitar, bouzouki (2)
- Rich Redmond – drums (2)
- Jerry Roe – drums (1, 5, 8, 9), percussion (9)
- Kevin Rooney – programming (7)
- Justin Schipper – steel guitar (9)
- Adam Shoenfeld – electric guitar (2)
- Jimmie Lee Sloas – bass guitar (4)
- Ilya Toshinskiy – acoustic guitar (1, 3–8), mandolin (4), electric guitar (5)
- Travis Toy – steel guitar (4)
- Derek Wells – electric guitar (5)
- Nir Z – drums (4)

Production

- Bill Appleberry – engineering (4)
- Derek Bason – mixing (2, 4, 7, 10), engineering (2, 4, 7, 8, 10), digital editing (2, 4, 10), additional engineering (1)
- Drew Bollman – engineering 1, 3–6, 9)
- Andrew Boullianne – recording, engineering assistance (1)
- Austin Brown – recording, engineering assistance (1, 5, 8)
- Greg Eliason – engineering (7)
- Tommy English – producer, additional engineering (1)
- Sean Giovanni – engineering (3, 5, 6, 8), additional engineering (1)
- Mike Griffith – production coordination
- Jeremy Hatcher – additional engineering, programming (1)
- Jason Halbert – vocal producer (10)
- David Huff – digital editing, programming (1, 8, 9)
- Robert Johnson – recording, engineering assistance (7)
- Brian Judd – mixing assistance (7)
- Jase Keithley – mixing assistance (1, 3, 5, 6, 8, 9)
- Joe LaPorta – mastering
- Nick Lane – engineering (2, 10); recording, engineering assistance (4)
- Chris Lord-Alge – mixing (7)
- Sean Moffitt – mixing (1, 3, 5, 6, 8, 9)
- Seth Morton – additional engineering (3, 5, 6)
- Sean Neff – engineering (10)
- Luis Pacheco – engineering (7)
- Charlie Pennachio – vocal producer (1, 3, 5, 6, 8, 9)
- Keith Rodger – engineering (7)
- Chris Small – digital editing (1–6, 8–10), mixing assistance (2, 4, 10)
- Greyson Smith – additional engineering (7)
- Joey Stanca – recording, engineering assistance (3, 6)
- Chris Vanoverberghe – recording, engineering assistance (9)

== Charts ==
Chart performance for Life Is a Highway: Refueled Duets
Chart (2025)	Peak position
US Billboard 200	114
US Independent Albums (Billboard)	17
US Top Country Albums (Billboard)	26
