= Back to Us =

Tenth studio album by American country music trio Rascal Flatts

Studio album by Rascal Flatts
- Released: May 19, 2017
- Genre: Country
- Length: 35:14 (Standard edition); 45:11 (Deluxe edition)
- Label: Big Machine
- Producer: Rascal Flatts; busbee

Rascal Flatts chronology
The Greatest Gift of All (2016)	Back to Us (2017)	How They Remember You (2020)

Singles from Back to Us
- 1. "Yours If You Want It" Released: January 9, 2017; 2. "Back to Us" Released: August 21, 2017

Back to Us is the tenth studio album by American country music trio Rascal Flatts. It was released on May 19, 2017 through Big Machine Records. The group produced the album themselves, save one track on the deluxe edition, which was produced by Busbee. "Yours If You Want It" was released in January 2017 as the album's lead single, followed by the title track "Back to Us" in August of the same year. The album serves as a follow-up to 2014's Rewind. Back to Us earned the group their twelfth top-10 album on the Billboard Top Country Albums chart. A deluxe edition of the album also includes the songs "Hands Talk," "Thieves," and "Roller Rink."

This is the group's first album not to be produced by Dann Huff since 2004's Feels Like Today. It was the band's last full-length studio album released before their disbandment in 2021 and subsequent reformation in 2024.

== Content ==
Country singer Lauren Alaina features on the track "Are You Happy Now", which was co-written by all three members of Rascal Flatts. "I Know You Won't" was previously recorded by Carrie Underwood on her 2007 album, Carnival Ride. According to the band, the album hearkened back to their early work, with Jay DeMarcus stating: "There was a nostalgic feeling between the three of us while in the studio for this record, a feeling that was more reminiscent of our first albums. The journey we’ve all been on together is unreal and I can honestly say I’m even more excited about what is ahead for us. Back To Us is not only a title of a song on the album, but a feeling that has been building around this new music. It just fits in so many ways."

=== Singles ===
The record's lead single, "Yours If You Want It", was released on January 9, 2017. One of the song's writers, Andrew Dorff, died shortly before its release. Another single "Back to Us" was released on August 21, 2017.

== Commercial performance ==
Back to Us debuted at number 11 on the Billboard 200 chart dated June 10, 2017 with 30,000 album equivalent units (of which 25,000 were traditional album sales). The album also entered the Top Country Albums chart the same week at number 2, earning the group their twelfth top-10 album. The album has sold 68,600 copies in the US as of December 2017. The album did reach No. 1 on the Australian country album charts upon release.

== Critical reception ==
The album received positive reviews. Lauren Laffer of Sounds Like Nashville spoke positively of the album, saying, "The 10 tracks within the project feature Gary LeVox’s distinctive warm and emotive vocals while Jay DeMarcus' production skills only amplify Joe Don Rooney's guitar chops. Rascal Flatts continue to prove their staying power with Back to Us."

== Track listing ==
Back to Us – Standard edition
No.	Title	Writer(s)	Length
1.	"Yours If You Want It"	Andrew Dorff; Jonathan Singleton	3:25
2.	"Back to Us"	Cary Barlowe; David Hodges; Josh Thompson	3:58
3.	"I Know You Won't"	Steve McEwan; Wendell Mobley; Neil Thrasher	3:53
4.	"Hopin' You Were Lookin'"	Barlowe; Jesse Frasure; Shay Mooney; Dan Smyers	2:56
5.	"Dance"	Joe Don Rooney; Blair Daly; Troy Verges	3:21
6.	"Are You Happy Now" (with Lauren Alaina)	Jay DeMarcus; Gary LeVox; Rooney; Sean McConnell	3:59
7.	"Love What You've Done with the Place"	Benjy Davis; Mooney	3:31
8.	"Kiss You While I Can"	DeMarcus; Steven Lee Olsen; Greg Wells	3:14
9.	"Vandalized"	Luke Laird; Chris Stapleton	3:22
10.	"Our Night to Shine"	LeVox; Chris DeStefano; Travis Hill	3:35
Total length:			35:14

Back to Us – Deluxe edition
No.	Title	Writer(s)	Length
1.	"Yours If You Want It"	Dorff; Singleton	3:25
2.	"Hopin' You Were Lookin'"	Barlowe; Frasure; Mooney; Smyers	2:56
3.	"I Know You Won't"	McEwan; Mobley; Thrasher	3:53
4.	"Dance"	Rooney; Daly; Verges	3:21
5.	"Back to Us"	Barlowe; Hodges; Thompson	3:58
6.	"Kiss You While I Can"	DeMarcus; Olsen; Wells	3:14
7.	"Vandalized"	Laird; Stapleton	3:22
8.	"Are You Happy Now" (with Lauren Alaina)	DeMarcus; LeVox; Rooney; McConnell	3:59
9.	"Hands Talk"	LeVox; busbee; Jon Nite	3:35
10.	"Thieves"	DeMarcus; LeVox; Scooter Carusoe; DeStefano	3:10
11.	"Love What You've Done with the Place"	Davis; Mooney	3:31
12.	"Roller Rink"	Nick Brophy; Jeffrey East; Jennifer Hanson	3:12
13.	"Our Night to Shine"	LeVox; DeStefano; Hill	3:35
Total length:			45:11

Notes

- All songs produced by Rascal Flatts except "Hands Talk", produced by busbee.

== Personnel ==
Adapted from AllMusic

Rascal Flatts

- Jay DeMarcus – acoustic piano, keyboards, synthesizers, Moog bass, programming, acoustic guitar, electric guitar, banjo, bass guitar, horn arrangements, backing vocals
- Gary LeVox – lead vocals
- Joe Don Rooney – electric guitar, backing vocals

Additional Musicians

- Casey Brown – programming
- Dave Cohen – keyboards
- David Dorn – keyboards
- Rob McNelley – electric guitar
- Danny Rader – acoustic guitar, bouzouki, mandolin
- Travis Toy – steel guitar
- Dorian Crozier – drums
- Evan Hutchings – drums
- Jim Riley – drums
- Jimmy Bowland – baritone saxophone, tenor saxophone
- Chris McDonald – trombone, horn arrangements
- Jeff Bailey – trumpet
- Steve Patrick – trumpet
- Carole Rabinowitz – cello
- Betsy Lamb – viola
- Kristin Wilkinson – viola, string arrangements
- David Angell – violin
- Zeneba Bowers – violin
- David Davidson – violin
- Conni Ellisor – violin
- Lauren Alaina – lead and harmony vocals on "Are You Happy Now"

=== Production ===
- Allison Jones – A&R
- Rascal Flatts – producers
- busbee – producer on "Hands Talk"
- Derek Bason – engineer, mixing, digital editing
- Sean Neff – engineer, digital editing
- Justin Niebank – mixing
- Nick Lane – assistant engineer
- Bryce Roberts – assistant engineer
- Chris Small – assistant engineer, mix assistant
- David Huff – digital editing
- Adam Ayan – mastering at Gateway Mastering (Portland, Maine)
- Mike "Frog" Griffith – production coordinator
- Laurel Kittleson – production coordinator
- Janet Soled – production coordinator
- Sandi Spika Borchetta – art direction, design
- Becky Reiser – art direction, design
- David McClister – photography

== Charts ==
=== Weekly charts ===
Chart (2017)	Peak position
Australian Albums (ARIA)	24
Australian Country Albums (ARIA)	1
Canadian Albums (Billboard)	19
New Zealand Heatseekers Albums (RMNZ)	5
Scottish Albums (OCC)	45
UK Country Albums (OCC)	3
US Billboard 200	11
US Top Country Albums (Billboard)	2

=== Year-end charts ===
Chart (2017)	Position
US Top Country Albums (Billboard)	68

== Release history ==
Country	Date	Format	Label	Catalog no.	Ref.
Worldwide	May 19, 2017	CD	Big Machine	TBA	
Worldwide	May 19, 2017	Digital download	Big Machine	—N/a	
