= Rewind (Rascal Flatts song) =

Single by Rascal Flatts

from the album Rewind
- Released: January 21, 2014
- Genre: Country pop
- Length: 3:23
- Label: Big Machine
- Songwriters: Chris DeStefano; Ashley Gorley; Eric Paslay
- Producer: Rascal Flatts

Rascal Flatts singles chronology
"Sunrise" (2013)	"Rewind" (2014)	"Payback" (2014)

"Rewind" is a song written by Chris DeStefano, Ashley Gorley, and Eric Paslay, and recorded by American country music group Rascal Flatts. It is their 33rd single release, and the first from their ninth studio album of the same name.

== Content ==
Bassist Jay DeMarcus told USA Today that the song "felt like a good way to bridge the gap between familiar Rascal Flatts and a new era of Rascal Flatts". "Rewind" was recorded at DeMarcus's studio; unlike their previous several albums, which were produced by Dann Huff, "Rewind" is the first time that the band has produced any of their songs by themselves. The album will also include production credits from Huff and Howard Benson.

The song is a mid-tempo ballad with prominent electric guitar. In it, the narrator wishes that he could "rewind" and experience his first encounter with his lover a second time.

== Critical reception ==
Taste of Country staff described the song favorably, saying that it "The chorus provides a unique way of getting Rascal Flatts' romantic statement through to their audience" and "It's a familiar formula." Got Country Online's Tara Toro wrote that "The guitar riff introduction didn't excite me, but the melody and hook are very catchy. As always, Gary LeVox's vocals are strong, as are the trio's harmonies." She gave the song 4 stars out of 5. Also giving it 4 out of 5 stars, Matt Bjorke of Roughstock praised lead singer Gary LeVox's "regular vocal register" along with DeMarcus's and Joe Don Rooney's harmonies. He described it as having a "Beatles-like lead guitar" and said that it "is fresh and different for the band and that alone should help it become ...a massive radio hit."

== Music video ==
The music video was directed by Mason Dixon and premiered in February 2014. It starred Nashville actors and real life couple Josh Castle and Kaitlin Benedetto as the leads. The video received a CMT Award nomination for Group Video of the Year.

== Chart history ==
The song debuted at number 28 on the Country Airplay dated for the week ending January 25, 2014. It was the highest-debuting song that week. It sold 38,000 downloads on its debut week. As of June 2014, the single has sold 626,000 copies in the U.S. This is the band's fifteenth and final Top 40 single on the pop charts.

Chart (2014)	Peak position
Canada Hot 100 (Billboard)	41
Canada Country (Billboard)	6
US Billboard Hot 100	38
US Country Airplay (Billboard)	3
US Hot Country Songs (Billboard)	4
US Top Country Albums (Billboard) (EP)	40

=== Year-end charts ===
Chart (2014)	Position
US Country Airplay (Billboard)	19
US Hot Country Songs (Billboard)	22

== Certifications ==
Region	Certification	Certified units/sales
United States (RIAA)	Platinum	1,000,000^{‡}
^{‡} Sales+streaming figures based on certification alone.

== Track listing ==
Digital download

1. "Rewind" – 3:23

Walmart Exclusive EP

1. "Rewind"^{[a]} – 3:23
2. "Why Wait"^{[b]} – 3:44
3. "Come Wake Me Up"^{[c]} – 4:23
4. "Dancin' on My Grave"^{[d]} – 3:09

Notes

- ^{^[a]} From Rewind (2014)
- ^{^[b]} From Nothing Like This (2010)
- ^{^[c]} From Changed (2012)
- ^{^[d]} Later released in 2018 as a promotional single.
