= I Like the Sound of That =

Single by Rascal Flatts

from the album Rewind
- Released: August 31, 2015
- Genre: Country pop
- Length: 3:29
- Label: Big Machine
- Songwriters: Jesse Frasure; Shay Mooney; Meghan Trainor
- Producer: Rascal Flatts

Rascal Flatts singles chronology
"Riot" (2014)	"I Like the Sound of That" (2015)	"Yours If You Want It" (2017)

"I Like the Sound of That" is a song by American country music group Rascal Flatts. It was released on August 31, 2015, as the fourth and final single from their album Rewind. The song was written by Jesse Frasure along with American singer Meghan Trainor and Shay Mooney of the American country music duo Dan + Shay.

== Content ==
The song "lists a number of noises everyone is familiar with, but uses each as a symbol. In the first verse it’s the morning shower, the coffee pot and a door locking. All these mean the main character will be spending a few hours apart from his lover."

== Critical reception ==
An uncredited review from Taste of Country was favorable, saying that "a young lover’s song that relies on an older couple to recall those early days when eight hours at work seemed like eight years away from a familiar pair of lips.…'I Like the Sound of That' recalls the days of the band’s biggest hits. Once again they make love sound easy."

== Commercial performance ==
The song first entered the Billboard's Country Airplay chart at No. 40 on chart dated October 10, 2015, and entered the Hot Country Songs chart at No. 45 a week later. For the week ending April 30, 2016, the song reached number-one on the Country Airplay chart, becoming the trio's thirteenth number-one hit, and their first since "Banjo" in 2012. The song has sold 362,000 copies in the US as of August 2016.

== Music video ==
The music video was directed by Kenny Jackson and John Stephens and premiered in December 2015. The video shows the band performing in the recording studio and in concert.

== Charts ==
Chart (2015–2016)	Peak position
Canada Hot 100 (Billboard)	71
Canada Country (Billboard)	2
US Billboard Hot 100	52
US Country Airplay (Billboard)	1
US Hot Country Songs (Billboard)	8

=== Year end charts ===
Chart (2016)	Position
US Country Airplay (Billboard)	8
US Hot Country Songs (Billboard)	33

== Certifications ==
Region	Certification	Certified units/sales
United States (RIAA)	2× Platinum	2,000,000^{‡}
^{‡} Sales+streaming figures based on certification alone.
