= Rascal Flatts =

American country music band

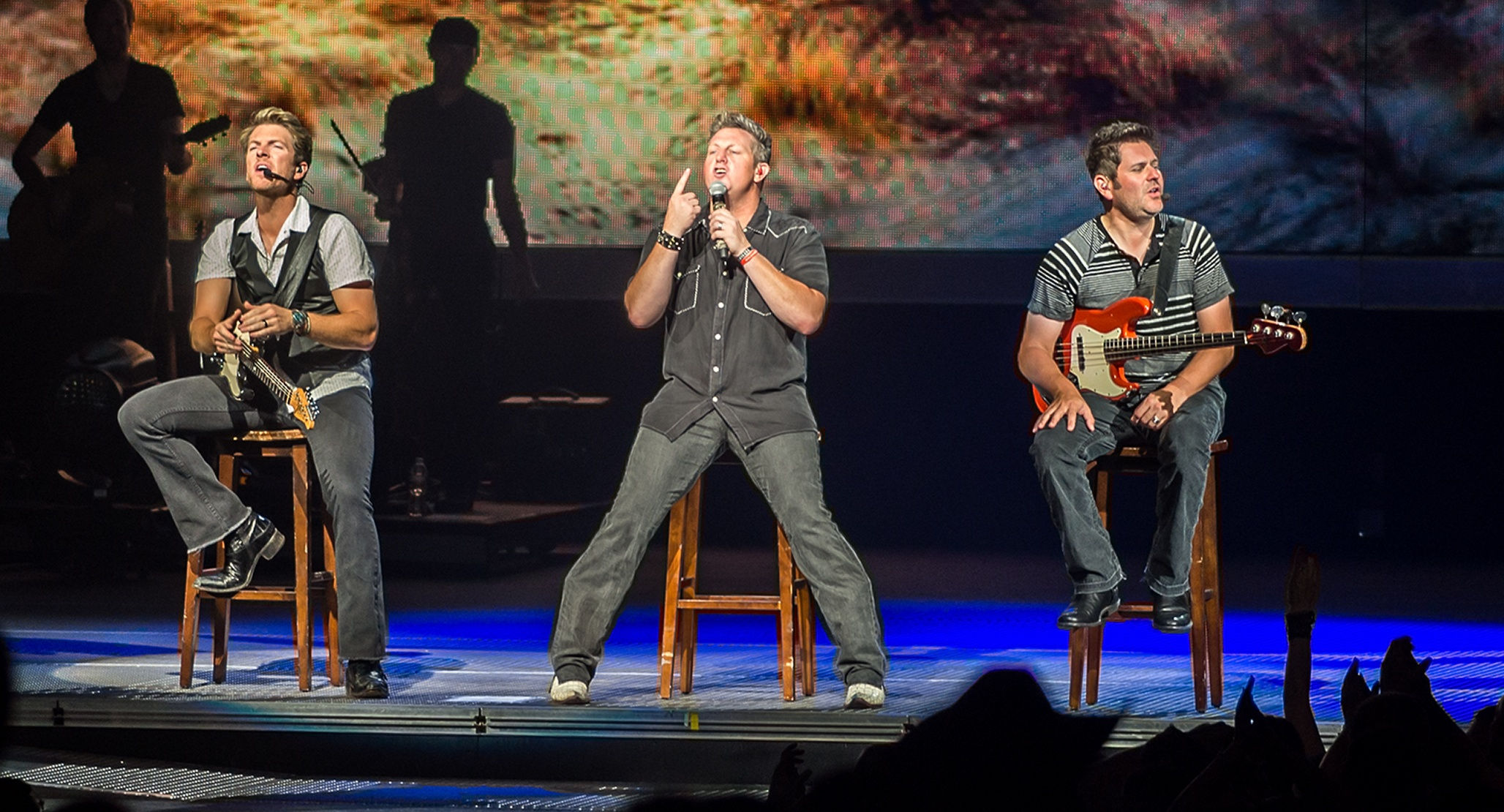
- Rascal Flatts performing in 2013 (L–R: Joe Don Rooney, Gary LeVox, and Jay DeMarcus)

Background information
- Origin: Nashville, Tennessee, U.S.
- Genres: Country; country pop; country rock
- Years active: 1999–2021; 2024–present
- Labels: Lyric Street; Big Machine
- Members: Jay DeMarcus; Gary LeVox; Joe Don Rooney
- Website: rascalflatts.com

Rascal Flatts is an American country music band from Nashville, Tennessee. Founded in 1999, the band consists of Gary LeVox (lead vocals), Jay DeMarcus (bass guitar, background vocals), and Joe Don Rooney (lead guitar, background vocals).

From 2000 to 2009, the band recorded six studio albums, all of which were certified platinum or higher. Their self-titled debut Rascal Flatts was released in 2000. This was followed by Melt (2002), which garnered their first number-one single, "These Days". Feels Like Today (2004), Me and My Gang (2006), Still Feels Good (2007), and Unstoppable (2009) all topped the U.S. Billboard 200 upon release. In their second decade, they recorded five more studio albums: Nothing Like This (2010), Changed (2012), Rewind (2014), a Christmas album entitled The Greatest Gift of All (2016), and Back to Us (2017). In 2020, the trio announced that they would be disbanding after 20 years together. A planned farewell tour was canceled due to the COVID-19 pandemic and the group officially disbanded in 2021. They announced a reunion in 2024, and following a tour commemorating their 25th anniversary, released their 11th studio album, a collaborative project entitled Life Is a Highway: Refueled Duets, in 2025.

Rascal Flatts has achieved 16 number-one hits on the Billboard Hot Country Songs, Country Airplay, and/or Canada Country charts. Their longest-running number-one was a cover of Marcus Hummon's "Bless the Broken Road". It was also named Best Country Song at the 48th Annual Grammy Awards. Their cover of Tom Cochrane's "Life Is a Highway" for the Disney/Pixar film Cars (2006) also achieved significant commercial success. The band was named Vocal Group of the Year by the Country Music Association every year from 2003 to 2008 and Top Vocal Group by the Academy of Country Music from 2003 to 2009, and won the American Music Award for Artist of the Year in 2006. They were inducted into the Grand Ole Opry in 2011 and received a star on the Hollywood Walk of Fame in 2012. In 2025, Billboard ranked the group #48 on their list of the Top 100 Artists of the 21st Century.

== Origin ==
We're not just business partners, we are good friends. That's why we have had the longevity we have.

— Joe Don Rooney, 2006, People magazine

Gary LeVox and Jay DeMarcus are second cousins from a musical family in Columbus, Ohio, and were raised there. DeMarcus moved to Nashville in 1992, earning his first record deal as part of a Christian group called East to West. In 1997, DeMarcus phoned LeVox and convinced him to come to Nashville and provide some harmonies on Michael English's album Gospel, which he was producing. They engineered the album together, and became English's backup band.

At the same time, DeMarcus had become the bandleader of Chely Wright's band, where he met Joe Don Rooney, a Picher, Oklahoma native who had recently secured a role as the guitarist in that band. DeMarcus and LeVox formed their own band and regularly performed at a Printer's Alley nightclub called the Fiddle and Steel Guitar Bar. When their part-time guitarist could not make it one night, DeMarcus invited Rooney to fill in. Jim Riley was the drummer and bandleader for the band. The three men covered the 1989 Shenandoah hit "The Church on Cumberland Road" that night. To the trio's recollection, a natural chemistry and bond were formed instantly.

Singer Mila Mason recommended the group to record producers Mark Bright and Marty Williams, who played Lyric Street Records A&R Doug Howard a three-song demo and Howard thought they were "just incredible." After he had heard the demos, the band went to the Lyric Street office the next day, sat down with acoustic guitars, and played a couple of songs. According to Howard in an interview with HitQuarters: "The vocals and harmonies, it was all there—I was just blown away. The lead singer has such a unique and compelling voice." The band was signed to Lyric Street in September 1999.

== Career ==
=== 2000–2005: Rascal Flatts, Melt, and Feels Like Today ===
In February 2000, the group made its debut with the single "Prayin' for Daylight". The song had been on the three-track demo that had gotten the band signed. The song, which reached number three on Billboard Hot Country Songs, was the first single from their self-titled debut, which was issued in June 2000 on Lyric Street. Following "Prayin' for Daylight", the album's other three singles all made the top 10 on that chart with "This Everyday Love", "While You Loved Me", and "I'm Movin' On", respectively, peaking at numbers nine, seven, and four. "I'm Movin' On" was awarded Song of the Year by the Academy of Country Music in 2002. Stephen Thomas Erlewine reviewed the album with favor, calling it "a sunny, pleasing modern country-pop album".

In November 2000, the group contributed the song "Walk the Llama Llama" to the soundtrack for the Disney film The Emperor's New Groove (2000). In early 2002, they also recorded a song titled "The Glory of Life" for the Paramount war film We Were Soldiers (2002). Their sophomore album Melt was released on October 29, 2002. Unlike its predecessor, Melt was co-produced by the band. The album's first single, "These Days", became the band's first number-one hit on the U.S. country charts. The album included two more Top 10 hits with "Love You Out Loud" and "I Melt". "Mayberry", the album's fourth and final single, became the band's second number one in 2004. The music video for "I Melt" garnered controversy for its scenes that featured partial nudity, and was banned from the Great American Country network. An album cut from Melt entitled "My Worst Fear" also received a music video in 2004.

Rascal Flatts' third album, Feels Like Today, was released in September 2004. The album topped the Billboard 200 and Top Country Albums charts upon release. The album's title track was released as its first single. The second single was "Bless the Broken Road". The song was originally recorded by its co-writer, Marcus Hummon, and had also been recorded by Melodie Crittenden (whose version charted in 1998), the Nitty Gritty Dirt Band, and Sons of the Desert. In early 2005, Rascal Flatts' version became the band's third number-one hit on the U.S. country charts and spent five weeks at that position. The third single, "Fast Cars and Freedom", hit number one, as well. While the latter was climbing the charts, some radio stations began playing a hidden track on the album, titled "Skin". This airplay caused "Skin" to enter the top 40. The song was released as a single under the title "Skin (Sarabeth)" and officially added to the album's track list, later peaking at number two on the country charts.

=== 2005–2008: Me and My Gang and Still Feels Good ===
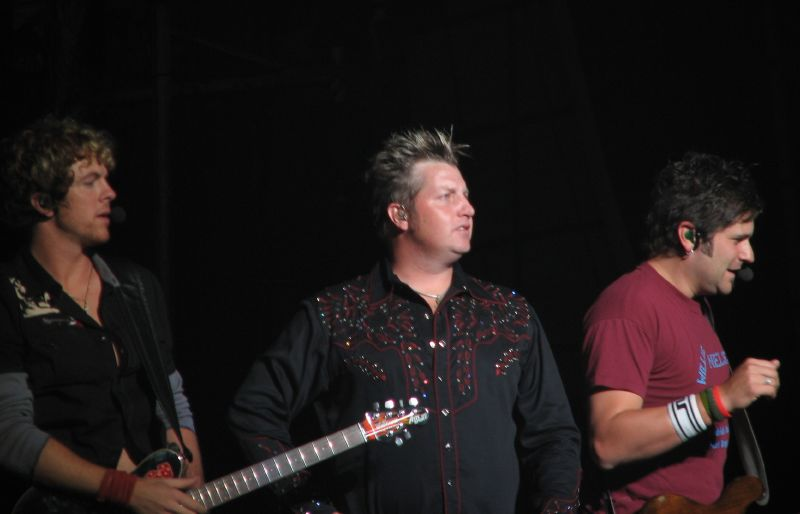
Rascal Flatts performing at the Crawford County Fair in Meadville, Pennsylvania, August 2005

Rascal Flatts's 13th chart entry, "What Hurts the Most", was released in January 2006. This song had previously been recorded by Mark Wills in 2003. Rascal Flatts' version of that song was released as the first single from their fourth album Me and My Gang, which was released in April. For the full album, the band worked with producer Dann Huff to create a more band-oriented album. Rascal Flatts' rendition of "What Hurts the Most" was a crossover hit for the band, reaching number one on both the country and adult contemporary charts, as well as peaking at number six on the Billboard Hot 100, spending a total of 51 weeks on the latter chart. The album's title track was released as the second single and reached number six on the country chart. The third and fourth singles, "My Wish" and "Stand", both reached number one.

In the summer of 2006, the group charted in the top 10 of the Hot 100 again with a cover of Tom Cochrane's "Life Is a Highway", which they recorded for the Disney/Pixar film Cars. Although "Life Is a Highway" was not released to country radio, many country stations began playing the song, causing it to chart within the top 20 of Hot Country Songs. Me and My Gang had the highest U.S. debut of 2006, with 722,000 units in April. The album spent 15 weeks at number one on the Billboard Top Country Albums chart and was the second-best selling album of 2006 (behind High School Musical), with sales totaling to about 3.5 million by year's end. The album's success led the band to take the spot of top-selling artist for all genres of music, which had not been accomplished in 15 years by a country group. In the summer of 2007, the band recorded a cover of the 1968 Beatles song "Revolution" for the film Evan Almighty.

Later the same year, the group released the single "Take Me There", a song which Kenny Chesney co-wrote and had initially planned to record himself. That song became a number-one country hit for the band in September and served as the first single from the album Still Feels Good. It was followed by "Winner at a Losing Game", which was the first single the band had written themselves. The single and its followup "Every Day" both reached number two on the country charts in 2008. The fourth single from the album, "Bob That Head", became the band's first single to miss the top 10 on the chart. The fifth and final single, "Here", was released in August 2008 and became the band's ninth number-one hit on the chart week of January 3, 2009.

=== 2008–2010: Greatest Hits Volume 1 and Unstoppable ===
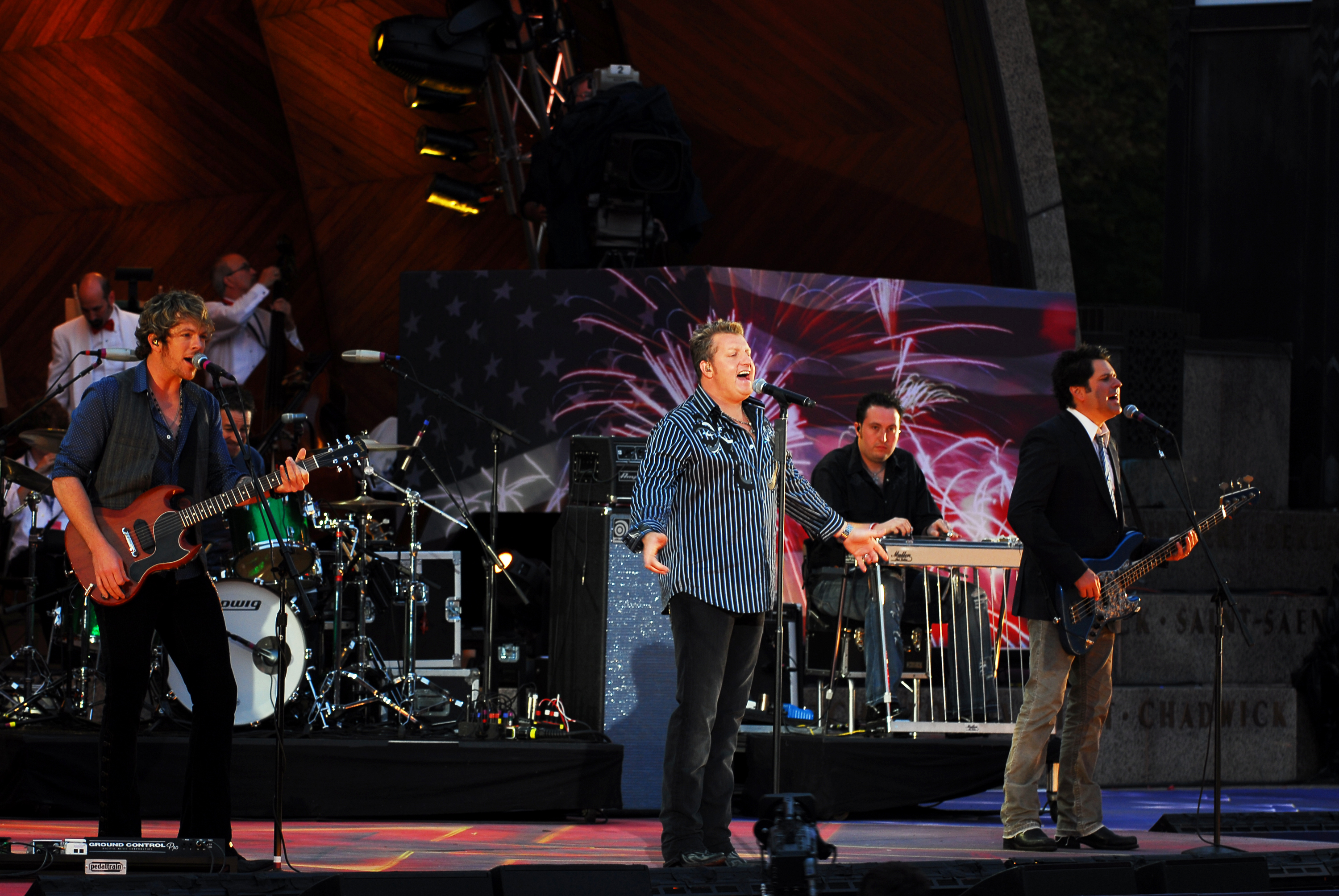
Rascal Flatts performing in Boston, Massachusetts on July 4, 2008

Rascal Flatts released their first compilation album, Greatest Hits Volume 1, on October 28, 2008. The album contains 13 of their biggest songs, starting with "Prayin' for Daylight" and going through "Life Is a Highway". The limited edition of the album contains a second disc with three Christmas songs: "White Christmas", "Jingle Bell Rock", and "I'll Be Home for Christmas". A year later in October 2009, they released a second edition of their greatest hits collection, this time with a second disc containing live performances of "Take Me There", "Summer Nights", "Me & My Gang", and "Winner at a Losing Game".

In January 2009, Rascal Flatts released the song "Here Comes Goodbye" as the first single from the album Unstoppable, which was released on April 7 of that year. Co-written by American Idol season-six finalist Chris Sligh, "Here Comes Goodbye" became the group's 10th number-one hit. The second single from the Unstoppable album, "Summer Nights", which was co-written by LeVox, was released in early May 2009. That song debuted at number 57 and topped out at number two on the country charts. The third single off the album, "Why", peaked at number 18 on the country charts, their poorest-charting effort to date. The title track was released as the album's fourth single in January 2010 and peaked at number seven on the country chart in June. In April 2009, the band contributed re-recordings of their songs "Bless the Broken Road" and "Backwards" for the soundtrack of Hannah Montana: The Movie (2009), in which they also appeared.

A special release version of their album Unstoppable sold at JCPenney stores nationwide featured an exclusive bonus track entitled "American Living" only available on the albums sold there. JCPenney was the official sponsor of Rascal Flatts' Unstoppable American Living Tour. On July 16, 2009, as part of the American Living Tour, Rascal Flatts made history as the first country music group to play Chicago's Wrigley Field. The trio was joined by fellow artists Vince Gill and Darius Rucker for a near-sellout crowd.

=== 2010–2011: Label change and Nothing Like This ===
After the closure of Lyric Street in April 2010, Rascal Flatts signed to Big Machine Records in July of that year. The group's first single from the label was "Why Wait". The song was the first single from the album Nothing Like This, which was released November 16, 2010. In December 2010, "Why Wait" became the trio's 11th number-one hit on the U.S. country charts.

In March 2011, Rascal Flatts was featured on a remix of Justin Bieber's song "That Should Be Me". The second single from Nothing Like This was "I Won't Let Go". That song went to number two in early 2011. Following it was the band's first collaborative release to country radio, "Easy", which is a duet with British pop singer Natasha Bedingfield. "I Won't Let Go", and "Easy" peaked at numbers two and three, respectively, on the country charts. On November 8, 2011, Hollywood Records released The Best of Rascal Flatts Live.

=== 2012–2013: Changed ===
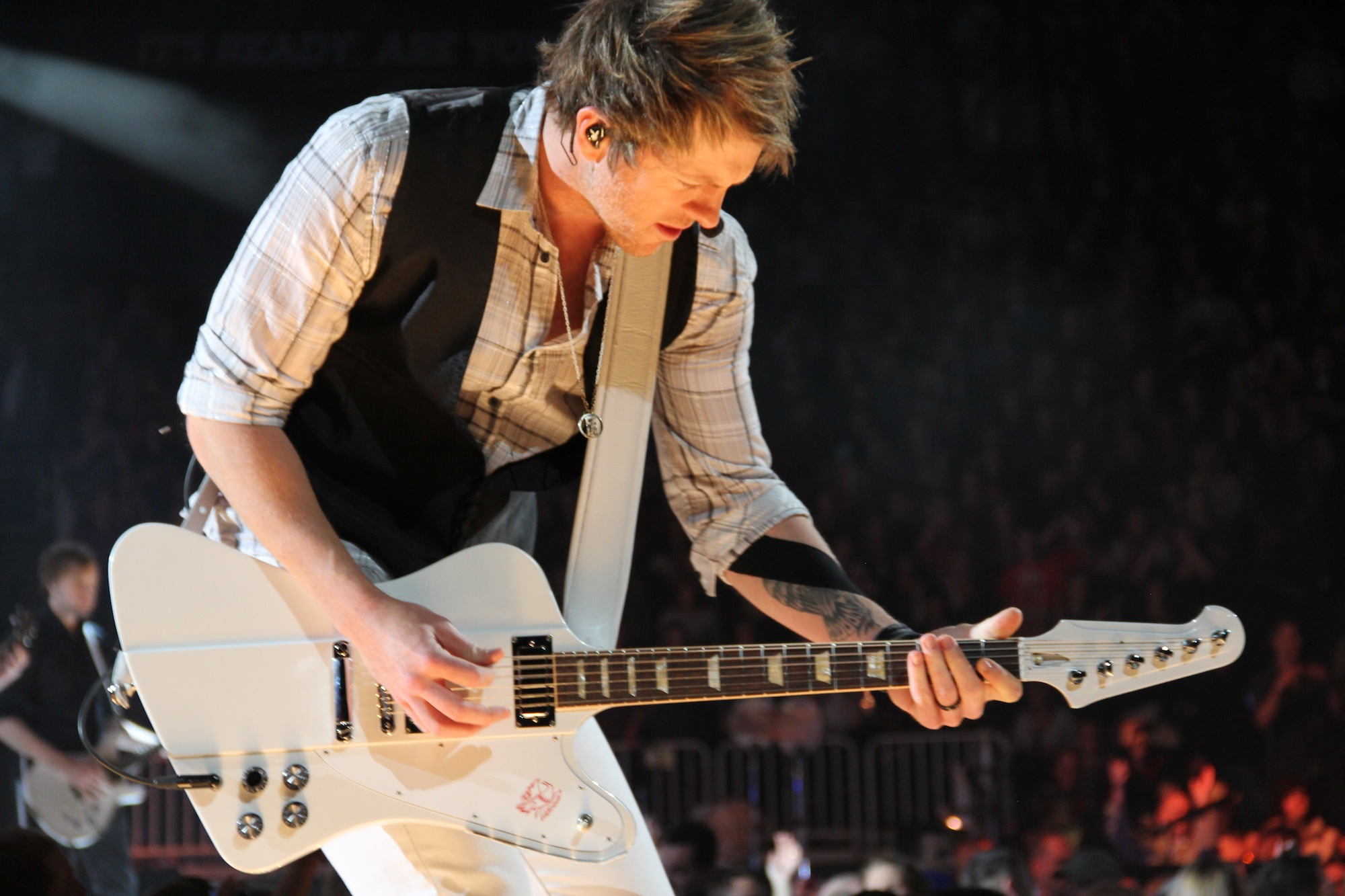
Rooney playing guitar in 2012

Rascal Flatts' eighth studio album, Changed, was released on April 3, 2012. It was produced by Dann Huff and Rascal Flatts. The first single from that album, "Banjo", became their 12th number-one on the country charts. The second single off the album, "Come Wake Me Up", reached number four on the Country Airplay chart. The third single from the album was its title track, which peaked at number 20 on the Airplay chart.

Rascal Flatts received the 2,480th star in the category of recording of the Hollywood Walk of Fame on September 17, 2012. The star is located in front of the Sergeant Supply Store at 6664 Hollywood Boulevard. As country artists with Oklahoma ties, they were second to receive a star on the Hollywood Walk of Fame that month after Oklahoman Vince Gill received his star the previous week.

On November 19, Rascal Flatts released a DVD, All Access & Uncovered: The Making of Changed and Beyond, inviting the public into their inner circle. The DVD project revealed a more intimate side of the trio's lives during the making of Changed. The project made a one-night-only debut in movie theaters across the country in conjunction with the album release earlier that year, with the band celebrating with fans at the AMC Theater in New York City's Times Square. On November 20, the band made a guest appearance on NBC's The Voice to promote their new DVD. They performed "Changed" with Cody Belew and Cassadee Pope, contestants from the show.

In December 2012, Rascal Flatts and Nashville actress Hayden Panettiere hosted the third annual 2012 CMT Artists of the Year to honor the top country acts of the year. Rascal Flatts also hosted The 14th Annual A Home for the Holidays with Rascal Flatts. The show earned a 4.91(million) rating. Rascal Flatts and Journey headlined the Super Bowl XLVII CMT Crossroads concert at the New Orleans Sugar Mill on February 2, 2013. This marked the second collaboration for Rascal Flatts and Journey. In June 2012, Rascal Flatts closed the CMT Music Awards by inviting Journey to perform their hit "Don't Stop Believin'" with them on stage. Rascal Flatts was nominated for International Artist of the Year and International Music Video of the Year (for "Banjo" and "Come Wake Me Up") at the 2013 CMC Music Awards.

=== 2013–2016: Rewind and The Greatest Gift of All ===
On April 8, 2013, DeMarcus tweeted that Rascal Flatts was working on a new album The lead single, "Rewind", was issued in January 2014 from the album of the same name, which was released on May 13, 2014. The band admitted they were lip-syncing to a recording of "Rewind" during the Academy of Country Music Awards on April 6, 2014. In response to the controversy, Rascal Flatts communicated afterwards that LeVox had lost his voice and so they made a last-minute decision to lip-sync. "Rewind" became a top-five hit on the Country Airplay chart in 2014. Rewind produced three more singles with "Payback", which peaked at 21, "Riot", which reached 20, and "I Like the Sound of That", which was released to country radio on September 14, 2015. The latter song, co-written by Shay Mooney of Dan + Shay and pop musician Meghan Trainor, reached number one on the Country Airplay chart in April 2016. That year, Rascal Flatts were selected as one of 30 artists to perform on "Forever Country", a mash-up track of "Take Me Home, Country Roads", "On the Road Again", and "I Will Always Love You", which celebrates 50 years of the CMA Awards. The band released a Christmas album entitled The Greatest Gift of All in October 2016.

=== 2017–2020: Back to Us, announced breakup and second greatest hits package ===
Rascal Flatts' next single, "Yours If You Want It", was released to country radio in early 2017. The track served as the lead single from their 10th studio album Back to Us, which was released on May 19 of the same year. It topped the Country Airplay charts in August 2017, marking the band's 14th number one on the chart. On September 28, 2018, the band released a new single titled "Back to Life" and embarked on their Summer Playlist tour in summer 2019.

On January 7, 2020, Rascal Flatts appeared on CBS This Morning to announce a farewell tour, the "Rascal Flatts: Life Is a Highway Tour" to celebrate their 20th anniversary. They also promised new music. On February 25, Gary LeVox posted on Instagram that the band was working on a new album. On May 1, the band released a cover of "Through the Years" as a tribute to the late Kenny Rogers. On May 19, the group announced on social media that their farewell tour had been indefinitely postponed amid the COVID-19 pandemic in the United States. The band released a new single entitled "How They Remember You" on June 19. It appears on an EP of the same name, released on July 31. On September 18, the band announced a new greatest-hits package, Twenty Years of Rascal Flatts: The Greatest Hits, released on October 2.

In November 2020, the band was forced to cancel their performance at the 54th Annual CMA Awards after an unspecified member tested positive for COVID-19.

=== 2021–2024: Confirmed breakup and solo projects ===
Appearing alongside LeVox and Rooney, DeMarcus told Access Hollywood in August 2020 regarding the resumption of the farewell tour: "I don't know what the tour's gonna look like. We don't know when it's gonna happen. But, I don't even know if it's gonna be a farewell tour."

LeVox released his first solo material, a Christmas song entitled "Christmas Will Be Different This Year", on November 13, 2020 and DeMarcus released a song entitled "Music Man" on January 29, 2021, as a tribute to his late father. LeVox released a Christian single entitled "The Distance" on March 19, 2021, as part of an EP entitled One On One released that same year. In an interview for Billboard, LeVox revealed that Rascal Flatts would not tour at any point in 2021. On April 27, 2021, DeMarcus mentioned in an interview with Taste of Country that the pandemic may have altered the band's plans for a farewell tour, and they may stay together and perform 10 to 15 concerts annually. In July 2021, DeMarcus and Rooney attended the American Century Championship together. When asked if the band had broken up, Rooney said; "No, we're never going to be done. No way. For us now, we are just recalibrating things, taking some time off and waiting for things to open up the next couple of years. We have no set year yet even, but at some point, we'll get back at it." DeMarcus himself said; "Rascal Flatts is bigger than the three of us. The time will come when we pass the torch, but first, we have some unfinished business."

DeMarcus and Rooney appeared at the 2021 Academy of Country Music Honors show on August 25 to receive the Cliffie Stone Icon Award on behalf of the group, though LeVox was not present. Additionally, DeMarcus and Rooney did not mention him or address his absence. In October, LeVox revealed that the band decided to break up officially, citing that Rooney had quit the band. LeVox also revealed he had not spoken to Rooney since his DUI arrest on September 10 and that the group quietly disbanded after the cancellation of their farewell tour. In 2020, DeMarcus formed a new band called Generation Radio alongside ex-Chicago vocalist Jason Scheff, Journey drummer Deen Castronovo, Chris Rodriguez and former Rascal Flatts live instrumentalist Tom Yankton. Their eponymous debut album, released on August 12, 2022, features a new rendition of Rascal Flatts' song "All Night to Get There", with DeMarcus on lead vocals. LeVox released a new single titled "Get Down Like That" on August 19, 2022, followed by a live EP entitled LeVox Live in June 2024.

In a June 2023 appearance on Savannah Chrisley's podcast Unlocked with Savannah, DeMarcus further elaborated on the band's breakup and the possibility of a reunion: "I would want to say never say never. But we're in such different places right now and don't really communicate on a consistent basis. There are just so many steps that would have to take place in order for us to get back to even talking about it. It's not too late, I just...I think the further we get away from it the harder it is to put it back together. For us, the thing that happened is we burnt the candle at both ends for so long. It was a never-ending cycle and it did work, but it's hard to put the machine down or put the brakes on when everything is cruising along and going full-speed ahead. For us, we should have taken a break at some point, just a year off to kind of collect ourselves, hit the reset button." On June 13, 2024, DeMarcus and Rooney performed onstage together for the first time since March 2020, performing with Chicago-based cover band Maggie Speaks.

=== 2024–present: Reunion and Life Is a Highway: Refueled Duets ===
After a series of teasers and speculation, the band announced on October 1, 2024, that they would reunite to commemorate their 25th anniversary with a 21-date tour entitled the Life Is a Highway Tour. The tour commenced in February 2025. On January 20, 2025, Rascal Flatts performed together for the first time in nearly five years at the Commander in Chief Ball during the second inauguration of Donald Trump. Four days later, they announced on social media that they were working on new music. On January 31, the group released a new single entitled "I Dare You" featuring the American pop rock band Jonas Brothers. On June 6, 2025, they released their new album Life Is a Highway: Refueled Duets. In addition to their duet with the Jonas Brothers, the album features nine reimagined recordings of their past hits with artists including Kelly Clarkson, Blake Shelton, Backstreet Boys, Jason Aldean, Carly Pearce, Brandon Lake, Ashley Cooke, Jordan Davis, and Lzzy Hale. On March 13, 2026, MusicRow Magazine awarded the trio in the Group/Duo of the Year category of their Country Breakout Awards, the group's first win for such an award since the 44th Academy of Country Music Awards in 2009. In July 2026, "Life Is a Highway" crossed 1 billion lifetime streams on Spotify, becoming just the 17th country song in the platform's history to achieve the plateau.

== Artistry ==
Rascal Flatts' music is defined primarily by country pop influences, as well as their distinct vocal harmonies. Though the band is a vocal group, DeMarcus and Rooney have played bass and lead guitar on most of the band's catalog. While the band's contemporaries, namely Tim McGraw and Chesney, originally incorporated a more neotraditional country approach to their sound, Rascal Flatts employed a crossover-friendly country pop sound as early as their debut album. This led to them often being derided as a country boy band, the genre's response to the wave of success seen by acts such as NSYNC and the Backstreet Boys. Brian Mansfield of USA Today felt "Rascal Flatts—with clean-cut looks, showy vocals and pop-influenced arrangements—quickly found fans, as well as detractors willing to lump them with the boy-band knockoffs." DeMarcus recalled, "Randy Owen from Alabama grabbed me by the shoulders at the CMA Awards in New York. He said, 'I'm not going to BS you, buddy. Nobody likes you. Everybody hates you. You're just taking over the spot we were in 20 years ago.'" Rooney recalled hearing the Dixie Chicks on the radio for the first time in 1997, saying, "I remember thinking, now here's a trio of girls who are incredible. They should come out with a trio of boys."

The band has cited Alabama, the Eagles, Shenandoah, George Jones, Earl Thomas Conley, Keith Whitley, Stevie Wonder, Eric Clapton, Merle Haggard, Johnny Cash, Jeff Beck and Vince Gill as being among their most prominent musical influences. LeVox told Billboard: "Alabama was huge for us—the songs that they chose and the harmonies. Shenandoah—[lead singer] Marty Raybon, to this day, is the finest country singer on the planet. Shenandoah had a huge impact on me. Of course, George Jones and Earl Thomas Conley—just the tone of their voices and songs they've recorded. Keith Whitley and Stevie Wonder, too. [Stevie] is one of the best singers on the planet." Rooney said, "Being a guitar player... people like Eric Clapton. I love Jeff Beck's playing and Chet Atkins and Vince Gill, those styles. I love technical players like Steve Vai and Larry Carlton. [I am a] huge Brent Mason fan. Dann Huff is one of my heroes, too. He always has been. He can do it all, the rock stuff, he can blues it up, too, and he can do some country chicken pickin', which I think is incredible." DeMarcus said, "Some of my biggest commercial musical influences would be people like Merle Haggard, George Jones, of course, Johnny Cash. People that wrote and sang their own stuff, I really admired. I was an '80s child, so I grew up loving all kinds of '80s rock. I like R&B, too."

Among the artists who claim the group as an influence on their own music are Hunter Hayes and Dan + Shay.

== Philanthropy ==
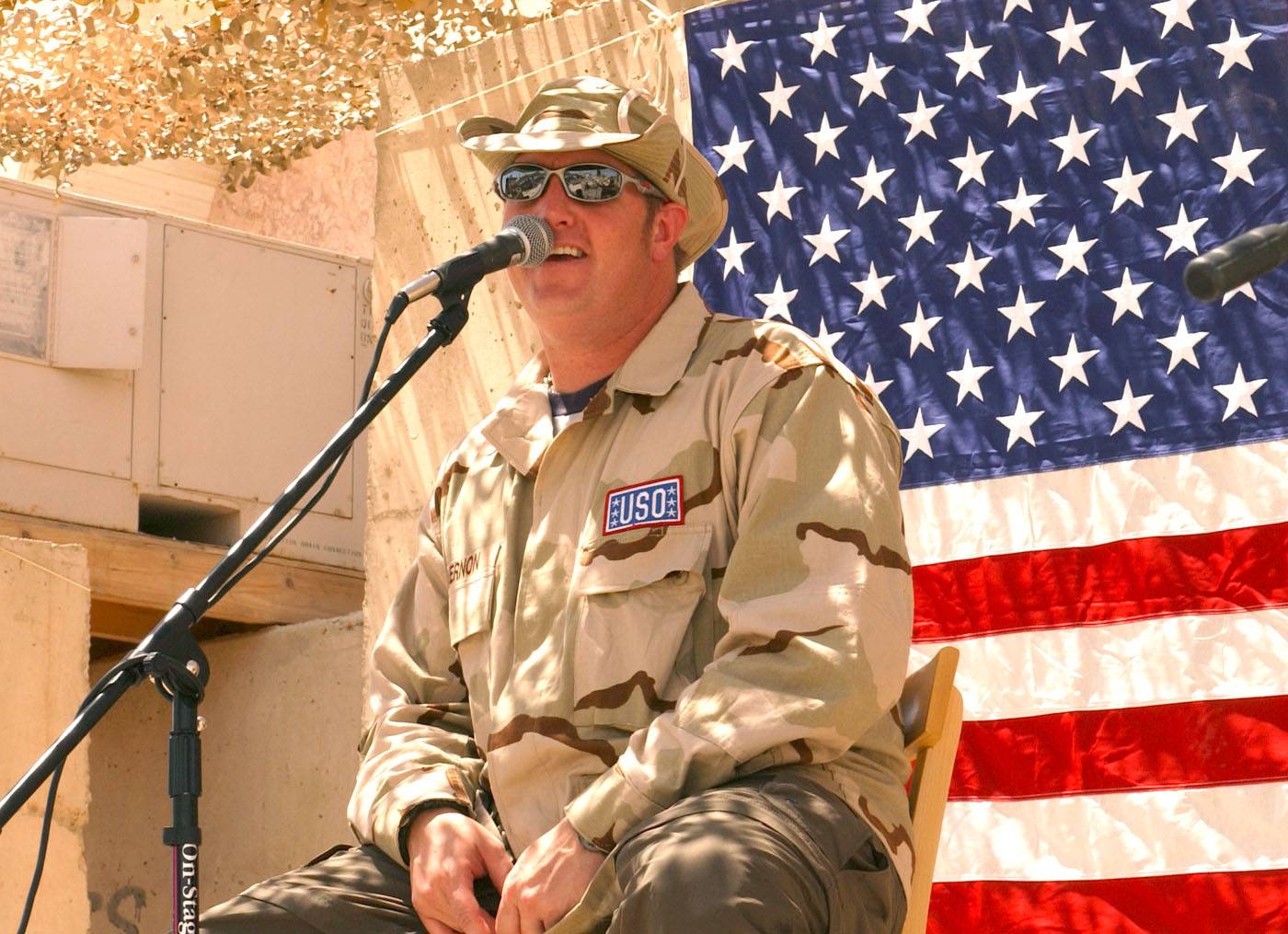
LeVox performing for members of the U.S. armed forces at Baghdad International Airport, August 2005

Rascal Flatts has helped support music education in disadvantaged U.S. public schools by filming a PSA with Little Kids Rock. The band has supported charities such as the Make A Wish Foundation. They helped raise one million dollars for the Central Ohio foundation. The event was Ohio State University's second annual "Big Wish Gala". "My Wish" has also been used on ESPN repeatedly over the years as the soundtrack for its series that follows the Make-a-Wish Foundation as they turn dreams into reality for children with life-threatening illnesses.

Since then, they have also contributed countable hours of their time—and $4 million—to Monroe Carell Jr. Children's Hospital at Vanderbilt, which is among the nation's leading pediatric facilities, where the Rascal Flatts Pediatric Surgery Center was named in recognition of the trio's long-standing involvement. They have raised and donated millions of dollars to the Monroe Carell Jr. Children's Hospital at Vanderbilt. They were also involved with the American Red Cross as members on the celebrity cabinet board.

== Reception ==
Early in the group's career, they attained an uncommon youth demographic (18–25) for country music. In September 2007, Weekly Reader Research conducted a poll of more than 2,000 children and Rascal Flatts ranked as the sixth-most-popular act among ages 10–12.

== Touring ==
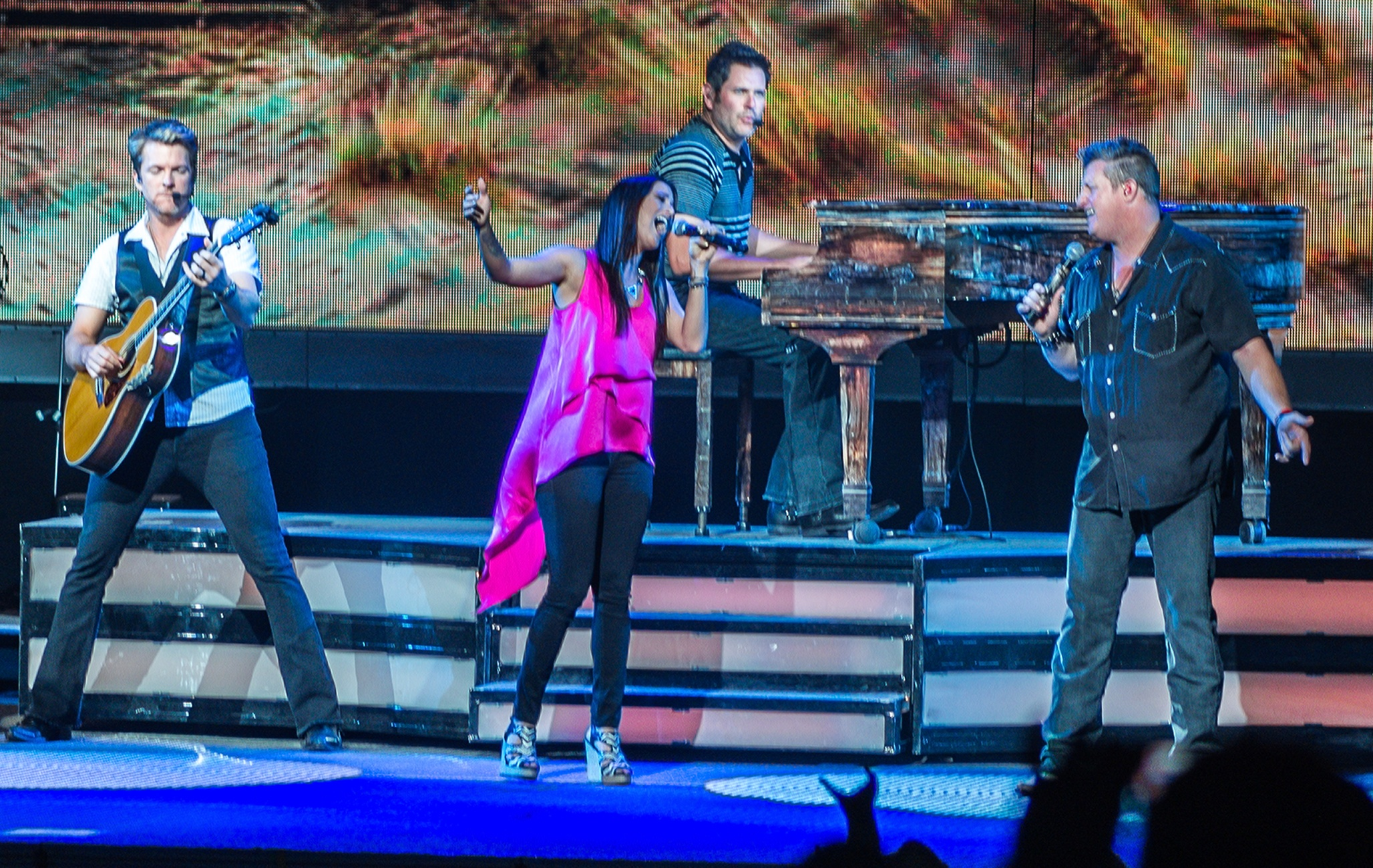
Rascal Flatts performing with Cassadee Pope in Phoenix, September 2013

Rascal Flatts has enjoyed financial success as a touring act. Nielsen reported that the band was the top-selling artist in 2006: "Rascal Flatts was the biggest-selling artist, with nearly 5 million physical album sales and nearly 4 million digital track sales." They had their first headlining tour in 2002, and by 2005 they were among the top 25 tours of the year, grossing $26.3 million in 777,384 tickets sold, according to Billboard Boxscore. Their follow-up tour in 2006 grossed $46.2 million, drawing more than a million people to 79 shows. Rascal Flatts had the third-highest U.S. country tour in 2007, grossing $34 million from 588,009 tickets sold. The group grossed $16.8 million from their summer tour. Rascal Flatts' shows are heavy on special effects, including videos, pyrotechnics and laser lights.

In 2013, Rascal Flatts was in Australia for the first time, headlining CMC Rocks the Hunter 2013, a three-day festival from March 15 to 17. They closed the show. Between 2004 and 2012, Rascal Flatts sold over 7 million tickets, making them one of the top-selling music acts in that time. In 2012, Rascal Flatts began the year with their "Thaw Out 2012" tour adding 47 additional dates on the Farmers Insurance Presents "Changed Tour" to bring the 2012 year-end total to just over 60 concerts and 1 million fans attending shows in the year alone. On April 9, 2013, the group announced that they would co-headline a show with Journey on August 1 at Hersheypark Stadium with the Band Perry and Cassadee Pope as openers. In 2016, Rascal Flatts celebrated a career milestone of 10 million tickets sold. As of 2020, Rascal Flatts had sold over 11 million concert tickets.

== Band members ==
Official members

- Jay DeMarcus – bass, backing vocals (1999–2021, 2024–present)
- Gary LeVox – lead vocals (1999–2021, 2024–present)
- Joe Don Rooney – lead guitar, backing vocals (1999–2021, 2024–present)

Touring and session members

- Jim Riley – drums, percussion (session and touring: 2000–2020, 2025–present)
- Nick Champeau – guitars, banjo (touring: 2025–present)
- Devin Malone – guitars, mandolin, steel, cello (touring: 2025–present)
- Wil Houchens – keyboards (touring: 2025–present)

Former touring and session members

- Travis Toy – steel, banjo, guitar (2004–2020)
- Mike Hicks – keyboards (touring: 2017–2020)
- Howard Duck - keyboards
- John “Chank” Jeansome - fiddle, harmonica
- Jonathan Trebing - guitars
- Kevin Rooney – multi-instrumentalist (touring: 2017–2019)
- Andy Wood – Guitar, mandolin, bouzouki (touring: 2015)
- Tim Akers - keyboards
- Mike Miller - keyboards, guitar
- Casey Brown - multi-instrumentalist

== Discography ==
=== Studio albums ===
- Rascal Flatts (2000)
- Melt (2002)
- Feels Like Today (2004)
- Me and My Gang (2006)
- Still Feels Good (2007)
- Unstoppable (2009)
- Nothing Like This (2010)
- Changed (2012)
- Rewind (2014)
- Back to Us (2017)
- Life Is a Highway: Refueled Duets (2025)

=== Tours ===
Headlining

- 2002–03: CMT Most Wanted Live/I Melt Tour
- 2004–05: Here's to You Tour
- 2006–07: Me & My Gang Tour
- 2007–08: Still Feels Good Tour
- 2008–09: Bob That Head Tour
- 2009–10: American Living Unstoppable Tour
- 2010–11: Nothing Like This Tour
- 2011: Flatts Fest Tour
- 2012: Thaw Out 2012 Tour
- 2012–13: Changed Tour
- 2013: Live & Loud Tour
- 2014: Rewind Tour
- 2015: Riot Tour
- 2016: Rhythm and Roots Tour
- 2018: Back to Us Tour
- 2019: Summer Playlist Tour
- 2025–26: Life Is a Highway Tour

Supporting

- 2000–01: Burn Tour (with Jo Dee Messina)
- 2002: Alan Jackson's Drive Tour with (Alan Jackson)
- 2003: Neon Circus & Wild West Show with (Brooks & Dunn)
- 2004: Guitars, Tiki Bars & Whole Lotta Love Tour with (Kenny Chesney)

== Awards ==
2000

- ACM Top New Vocal Duo Or Group (presented 2001)

2002

- CMA Horizon Award
- ACM Song of the Year ("I'm Movin' On") (presented 2003)
- ACM Top Vocal Group (presented 2003)

2003

- CMT Flameworthy Video Music Award for Group/Duo of the Year ("These Days")
- CMA Vocal Group of the Year
- ACM Top Vocal Group (presented 2004)

2004

- CMT Flameworthy Music Video Award for Group/Duo of the Year ("I Melt")
- CMA Vocal Group
- ACM Top Vocal Group (presented 2005)

2005

- CMT Music Award for Group/Duo of the Year ("Feels Like Today")
- CMA Vocal Group of the Year
- ACM Top Vocal Group (presented 2006)
- Radio Music Awards for Song of the Year/Country Radio ("Bless The Broken Road")
- Billboard Roadworks '05 Touring Awards for Breakthrough Act
- Grammy for Best Country Performance by a Duo or Group with Vocal ("Bless the Broken Road")

2006

- CMT Music Award for Group/Duo of the Year ("Skin (Sarabeth)")
- CMA Vocal Group of the Year
- AMA Artist of the Year
- AMA Favorite Country Band, Duo or Group
- AMA T-Mobile Text-In Award
- People's Choice Awards Favorite Song from a Movie ("Life Is A Highway")
- People's Choice Awards Favorite Song Remake ("Life Is A Highway")
- CMT Loaded Awards – Number One Digitally Active Group/Duo
- CMT Loaded Awards – Number One Streamed Music Video ("What Hurts the Most")
- Grammy Nomination: Best Country Performance by a Duo or Group with Vocal ("What Hurts The Most")

2007

- CMT Music Awards for Group Video of the Year ("What Hurts the Most")
- ACM Top Vocal Group (presented 2008)
- CMA Vocal Group of the Year
- AMA Favorite Country Band, Duo or Group
- BMI Song of The Year ("What Hurts The Most")

2008

- People's Choice Awards Favorite Country Song ("Stand")
- CMT Music Award for Group Video of the Year ("Take Me There")
- ACM Top Vocal Group (presented 2009)
- ACM Humanitarian Award
- CMA Vocal Group of the Year
- AMA Favorite Country Band, Duo or Group
- Grammy Nomination: Best Country Performance by a Duo or Group with Vocal ("Every Day")

2009

- People's Choice Awards Favorite Group
- CMT Music Award for Group Video of the Year ("Every Day")
- AMA Favorite Country Band, Duo or Group
- Grammy Nomination: Best Country Performance by a Duo or Group with Vocal ("Here Comes Goodbye")

2010

- Star on the Music City Walk of Fame
- ACA Decade Artist award

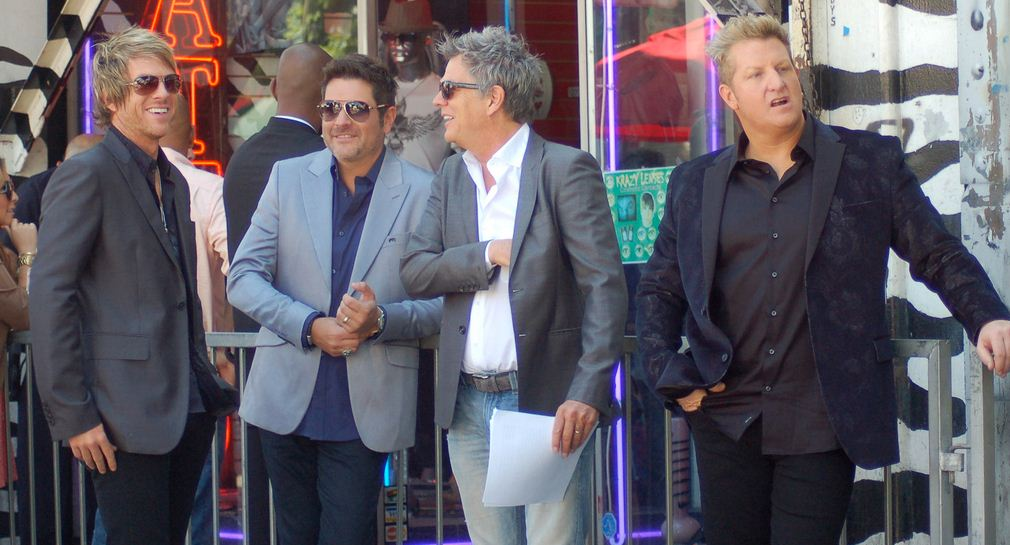
Rascal Flatts with David Foster receiving a star on the Hollywood Walk of Fame in September 2012

2011

- Tony Martell Lifetime Entertainment Achievement Award
- CMT Music Award for Collaborative Video of the Year ("That Should Be Me")
- Member of the Grand Ole Opry

2012

- CRS 2012 Artist Humanitarian Award
- Star on the Hollywood Walk of Fame

2013

- ACM Jim Reeves International Award (presented 2014)

2021

- CRS Artist Career Achievement Award
- ACM Cliffie Stone Icon Award

2025

- Billboard's Top 100 Artists of the 21st Century (#48)

2026

- MusicRow Country Breakout Award for Group/Duo of the Year

== Film and television appearances ==
The group appears as themselves in Hannah Montana: The Movie singing their song "Backwards" during the scene of Miley's grandma's birthday party, and then "Bless the Broken Road" in an evening scene on the front porch. They appeared as themselves, promoting Jamie Oliver's Food Revolution in Huntington, West Virginia.

The group appears as themselves on CSI (season 10 episode 14), in which they perform in concert. In the episode entitled "Unshockable", DeMarcus is electrocuted by what turned out to be their bass tech Travis Murray. On the commentary they said what a great opportunity it was to work with such fine actors who are so good at what they do, LeVox stated, "It's one of my favorite shows and it was an honor to add a little piece of Rascal Flatts to the episode." In early 2011, the band appeared in an episode of Inside West Coast Customs featuring a customized Chevrolet Camaro inspired by their song "Red Camaro".

On April 5, 2012, Rascal Flatts appeared on the television special Changed: One Night Exclusive Theater Event. The special in-theater concert hit movie screens nationwide for one night only. It included live performance footage, Q&A sessions, and welcome messages from the band. The event showcased many tracks from the upcoming studio album.
