= Payback (Rascal Flatts song) =

Single by Rascal Flatts

from the album Rewind
- Released: June 16, 2014
- Genre: Country pop
- Length: 2:59
- Label: Big Machine
- Songwriters: Aaron Eshuis; Neil Mason; Ryan Hurd
- Producer: Howard Benson

Rascal Flatts singles chronology
"Rewind" (2014)	"Payback" (2014)	"Riot" (2014)

"Payback" is a song recorded by American country music group Rascal Flatts. It was released in June 2014 as the second single from their ninth studio album, Rewind. The song was written by Aaron Eshuis, Neil Mason, and Ryan Hurd.

== Critical reception ==
The song received a favorable review from Taste of Country, calling it "an undeniable country earworm that’s bound to be a live show favorite" while adding that "it doesn’t sound like anything else on the radio, but stays true to Rascal Flatts’ repertoire."

== Music video ==
The music video was directed by Gary Halverson and premiered in October 2014.

== Chart performance ==
"Payback" debuted at number 46 on the U.S. Billboard Country Airplay chart for the week of June 21, 2014. It also debuted at number 47 on the U.S. Billboard Hot Country Songs chart for the week of July 12, 2014. The song peaked at number 21 on the Country Airplay chart for the week of October 25 holding that spot for two weeks, making it the group's first single to miss the top 20.

Chart (2014)	Peak position
Canada Country (Billboard)	36
US Bubbling Under Hot 100 (Billboard)	11
US Country Airplay (Billboard)	21
US Hot Country Songs (Billboard)	24

=== Year-end charts ===
Chart (2014)	Position
US Country Airplay (Billboard)	80
US Hot Country Songs (Billboard)	85
