= The Greatest Gift of All =

Studio album by Rascal Flatts
- Released: October 21, 2016
- Recorded: Summer 2016
- Genre: Christmas; country
- Length: 38:13
- Label: Big Machine
- Producer: Jay DeMarcus

Rascal Flatts chronology
Rewind (2014)	The Greatest Gift of All (2016)	Back to Us (2017)

The Greatest Gift of All is the first Christmas album recorded by American country pop trio Rascal Flatts. It was released October 21, 2016, through Big Machine Records. The album was produced by group member Jay DeMarcus.

== Critical reception ==
Stephen Thomas Erlewine of AllMusic rated the album three stars out of five and wrote that the "blend of the secular and the sacred, the new and the old, is a signature for Rascal Flatts, and it works well here." Laura Hostelley of Sounds Like Nashville wrote that the group "use their years of experience in the studio to attract attention," and complimented the album's production for setting it apart from other holiday-themed releases.

== Commercial performance ==
The Greatest Gift of All debuted at number 167 on the Billboard 200 chart dated November 12, 2016, selling 4,200 copies in its first week. It reached a peak position of 60 on the chart dated December 17, 2016. The Greatest Gift of All also reached number seven and six on the Top Country Albums and Top Holiday Albums charts, respectively. As of November 2017, the album has sold 69,100 copies in the United States.

== Track listing ==
No.	Title	Writer(s)	Length
1.	"Joy to the World" (arr. Tim Akers)	George Frederick Handel; Isaac Watts	3:38
2.	"O Holy Night"	Adolphe Adam; Placide Cappeau; John Sullivan Dwight	4:53
3.	"Deck the Halls"	Traditional	3:19
4.	"A Strange Way to Save the World"	David Clark; Mark Harris; Don Koch	3:53
5.	"Go Tell It on the Mountain" (arr. Akers)	John Wesley Work, Jr.	3:33
6.	"Let It Snow"	Sammy Cahn; Jule Styne	2:54
7.	"Silent Night"	Franz Xaver Gruber; Joseph Mohr; John Freeman Young	4:11
8.	"Someday at Christmas"	Ronald Norman Miller; Bryan Wells	3:14
9.	"The First Noel" (arr. Akers)	Traditional	4:50
10.	"Hark! The Herald Angels Sing"	Felix Mendelssohn; Charles Wesley	3:48
Total length:			38:13

== Charts ==
=== Weekly charts ===
Chart (2016)	Peak position
US Billboard 200	60
US Top Country Albums (Billboard)	7
US Top Holiday Albums (Billboard)	6

=== Year-end charts ===
Chart (2017)	Position
US Top Country Albums (Billboard)	77
