= Joe Don Rooney =

American guitarist (born 1975)

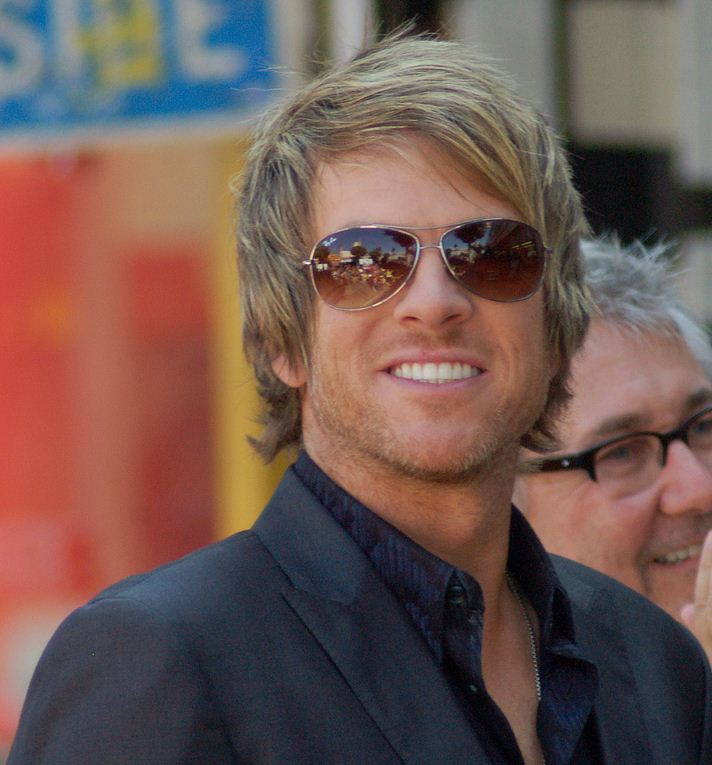
- Rooney at a ceremony to receive a star on the Hollywood Walk of Fame in September 2012

Background information
- Born: September 13, 1975 (age 50); Baxter Springs, Kansas, U.S.
- Origin: Picher, Oklahoma
- Genres: Country; country rock
- Occupation: Singer
- Instruments: Vocals; guitar; bass guitar; mandolin; banjo
- Years active: 1992–present
- Labels: Lyric Street, Big Machine
- Member of: Rascal Flatts
- Spouse: Tiffany Fallon (m. 2006; div. 2023)

Joe Don Rooney (born September 13, 1975) is an American musician. He is the lead guitarist and high octave harmony singer in the country music band Rascal Flatts.

In addition to the electric guitar, Rooney plays the acoustic and bass guitars, as well as mandolin and banjo. His influences include guitarists Chet Atkins, Eric Clapton and Jeff Beck.

== Biography ==
Joe Don Rooney's first band formed in 1992 under the name Uncle Thumbtack. In addition to Rooney playing lead guitar and singing backup harmony, this band included bass guitarist Gregory Fitzgibbon, acoustic guitarist Erin Fitzgibbon, drummer Colin Frayser, and rhythm guitarist Jason. Like future bandmate Jay DeMarcus, he also played in Chely Wright's band before Rascal Flatts. Rooney frequently jammed with family member musicians Justin Speer, Tracy Conder, and Jeramy Essary (to whom he later dedicated "I'm Movin' On").

In 2016, Rooney signed Dylan Brady to an artist development deal. Together, Brady and Rooney produced Brady's first single, "Shifting Gears," which was released in August 2018. In 2019, Rooney produced Brady's singles "Over Us" and "I Hate California."

== Personal life ==
Rooney has struggled with alcohol abuse throughout his career, though he became sober in 2021. In September 2024, he announced that he had maintained his sobriety for three years.

=== Relationships ===
Rooney married former beauty queen Tiffany Fallon on April 23, 2006. She was Miss Georgia USA in 2001 and 2nd runner-up for the Miss USA 2001 competition. She was also the 2005 Playmate of the Year. The couple was featured in the Playboy Cyber Club's celebrity photographer section, with the nude pictorial of Fallon being shot by Rooney himself. The couple have three children. The couple separated in 2021 and the divorce was finalized in 2023. As of 2025, Rooney is pursuing a new relationship with a woman named Jenny Hecht.

=== Legal issues ===
On September 9, 2021, he was arrested for and charged in Tennessee with driving under the influence after crashing his vehicle into a tree line. He sustained no injuries in the crash. On June 1, 2022, Rooney pleaded guilty to the charges; he was sentenced to one year in jail, with all but two days of the sentence suspended, and the loss of his driver's license.

== Discography ==
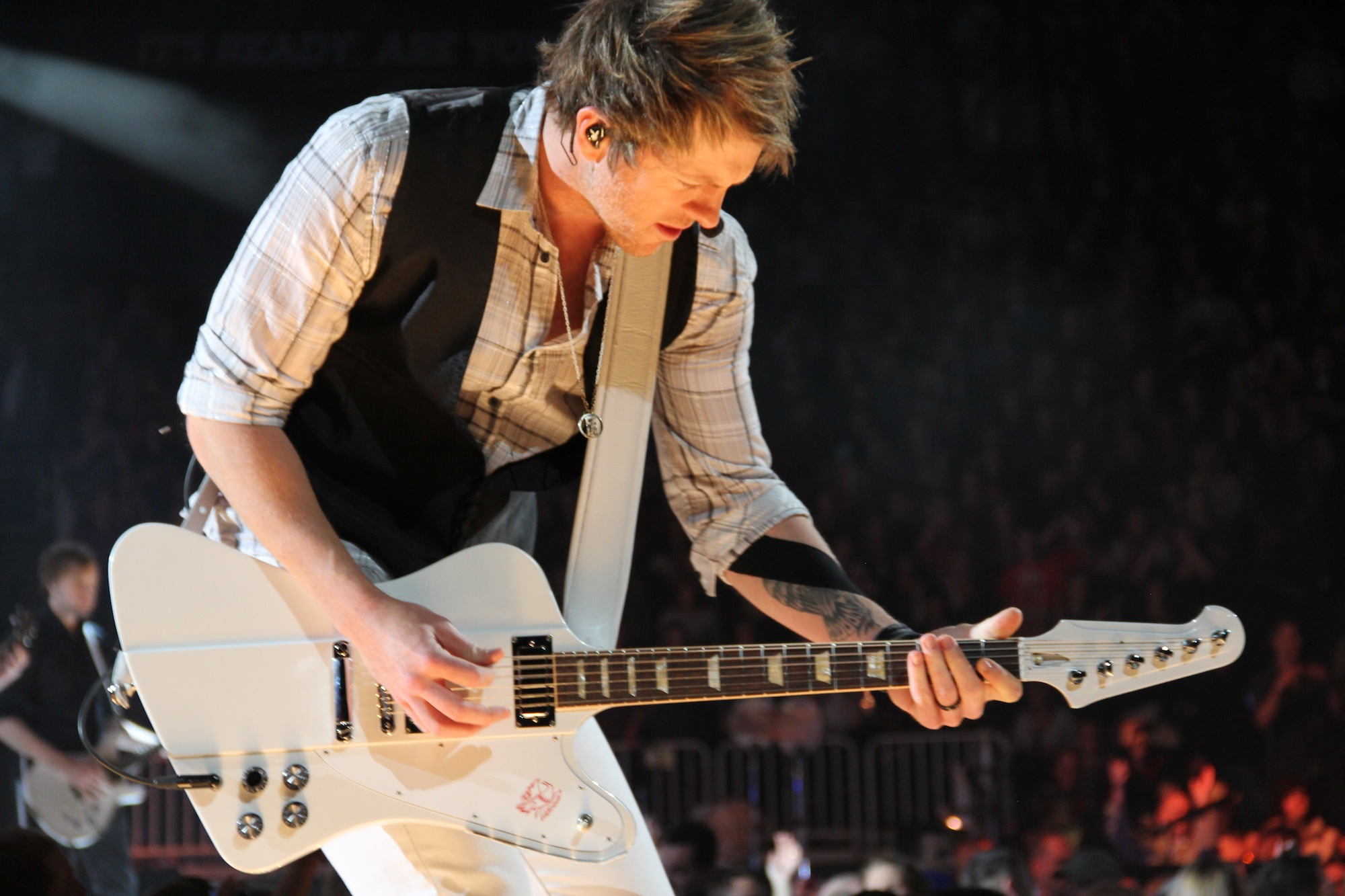
Rooney performing with Rascal Flatts in 2012

- Rascal Flatts (2000)
- Melt (2002)
- Feels Like Today (2004)
- Me and My Gang (2006)
- Still Feels Good (2007)
- Unstoppable (2009)
- Nothing Like This (2010)
- Changed (2012)
- Rewind (2014)
- The Greatest Gift of All (2016)
- Back to Us (2017)
- Life Is a Highway: Refueled Duets (2025)
