= Rewind (Rascal Flatts album) =

Studio album by Rascal Flatts
- Released: May 13, 2014
- Genre: Country
- Length: 47:40
- Label: Big Machine
- Producers: Howard Benson; Dann Huff; Rascal Flatts

Rascal Flatts chronology
Changed (2012)	Rewind (2014)	The Greatest Gift of All (2016)

Singles from Rewind
- 1. "Rewind" Released: January 21, 2014; 2. "Payback" Released: June 16, 2014; 3. "Riot" Released: November 24, 2014; 4. "I Like the Sound of That" Released: August 31, 2015

Rewind is the ninth studio album by American country music group Rascal Flatts. It was released on May 13, 2014 via Big Machine Records. The album was produced by Rascal Flatts, Howard Benson and Dann Huff. A deluxe edition is available at Target with four bonus tracks. With the exception of the deluxe edition track "She Must Like Broken Hearts", this is the group's only album to not feature any songwriting credits from the group themselves. It is their final album to be produced by Huff, whose relationship with the group began with their 2006 album Me and My Gang. This is the band's last album to top the Billboard Country Albums chart.

== Critical reception ==
Professional ratings
Review scores
Source	Rating
AllMusic	4/5 stars
Country Weekly	B+
USA Today	2.5/4 stars

Stephen Thomas Erlewine of AllMusic rated the album four stars out of five, writing that "it's hard not to succumb to Rascal Flatts' smooth touch." At Country Weekly, Bob Paxman graded the album a B+, stating that "Rewind is a great-sounding album that brings Flatts back to country's forefront." At USA Today, Brian Mansfield rated the album two-and-a-half stars out of four, remarking how "The trio retools its style with mixed results", yet its "High-flown ballads remain a strength, and Joe Don Rooney fans will thrill to his guitar work": however, "Elsewhere, the group just sounds as if like it's trying to keep up with the times."

== Commercial performance ==
The album debuted at No. 5 on the Billboard 200 and No. 1 on the Top Country Albums chart with sales of 61,000 in the US. As of June 2015, the album has sold 257,000 copies in the US.

== Track listing ==
No.	Title	Writer(s)	Producer(s)	Length
1.	"Payback"	Aaron Eshuis, Neil Mason, Ryan Hurd	Howard Benson	2:59
2.	"Rewind"	Chris DeStefano, Ashley Gorley, Eric Paslay	Rascal Flatts	3:24
3.	"I Have Never Been to Memphis"	Eric Holljes, Ian Holljes, Marcus Hummon	Benson	4:08
4.	"DJ Tonight"	Meghan Trainor, Jesse Frasure, Shay Mooney	Rascal Flatts	3:47
5.	"Powerful Stuff"	Gregg Wattenberg, Derek A. E. Fuhrmann, Brett James	Benson	3:15
6.	"Riot"	Jaron Boyer, Sara Haze	Rascal Flatts	3:50
7.	"Night of Our Lives"	Ben Hayslip, Jimmy Yeary	Benson	3:28
8.	"I Like the Sound of That"	Trainor, Frasure, Mooney	Rascal Flatts	3:29
9.	"Aftermath"	Ben Caver, Megan Conner, Brian White	Benson	3:39
10.	"I'm on Fire"	Sean McConnell, Tobias Lundgren, Johan Fransson, Tim Larsson	Rascal Flatts	3:56
11.	"Life's a Song"	Jeffrey Steele, Brandon Hood, James T. Slater	Dann Huff, Rascal Flatts	4:08
12.	"Honeysuckle Lazy"	Neil Thrasher, Michael Dulaney, Shane Minor	Rascal Flatts	4:02
13.	"The Mechanic"	Jaren Johnston, Tony Lane	Rascal Flatts	3:32
Total length:				47:40

Target deluxe edition (bonus tracks)
No.	Title	Writer(s)	Producer(s)	Length
14.	"Compass"	Diane Warren	Rascal Flatts	4:23
15.	"Wildfire"	John Mayer	Huff, Rascal Flatts	3:44
16.	"She Must Like Broken Hearts"	busbee, Rascal Flatts	Rascal Flatts	3:00
17.	"Bring the Family"	Regie Hamm, Tim Akers, Chase Akers	Benson	3:07
Total length:				61:54

== Personnel ==
Rascal Flatts

- Jay DeMarcus – programming, mandolin, bass guitar, backing vocals
- Gary LeVox – lead and backing vocals
- Joe Don Rooney – acoustic guitar, electric guitar, backing vocals

Additional musicians

- Tim Akers – keyboards, acoustic piano
- Howard Benson – keyboards, additional programming, backing vocals
- Charles Judge – keyboards, synthesizers, accordion, Hammond B3 organ
- Don Koch – programming
- Kris Crunk – synthesizers, orchestra programming
- James Matchack – synthesizers, orchestra programming
- Gordon Mote – acoustic piano
- Lenny Skolnik – programming
- Rob McNelley – acoustic guitar, electric guitar
- Tim Pierce – additional guitars
- Ilya Toshinsky – acoustic guitar, electric guitar, banjo, bouzouki, mandolin
- Dan Dugmore – steel guitar
- Paul Franklin – steel guitar
- Dorian Crozier – drums
- Josh Freese – drums
- Eric Darken – percussion
- Jeneé Fleener – fiddle
- Kim Keyes – backing vocals
- Gail Mayes – backing vocals
- Drea Rhenee – backing vocals

Strings

- David Campbell – arrangements and conductor
- Suzie Katayama – contractor
- John Catchings, Erika Duke-Kirkpatrick, Suzie Katayama, Steve Richards and Rudy Stein – cello
- Jeneé Fleener, Matthew Funes and Roland Kato – viola
- Kevin Connolly, Nina Evtuhov, Jeneé Fleener, Julian Hallmark, Songa Lee, Natalie Leggett, Mario de Leon, Grace Oh, Sara Parkins, Michele Richards and Josefina Vergara – violin

=== Technical credits ===
- Mike Plotnikoff – recording (1, 3, 5, 7, 9)
- Sean Neff – recording (2, 4, 6, 8, 10–13)
- Steve Churchyard – string recording
- Hatsukazu Inagaki – additional engineer (1, 3, 5, 7, 9), overdub recording (1, 3, 5, 7, 9)
- Dmitar Krnjaic – additional recording (1, 3, 5, 7, 9), recording assistant (1, 3, 5, 7, 9)
- Alexander Attalla – recording assistant (1, 3, 5, 7, 9)
- Anthony Diaz De Leon – recording assistant (1, 3, 5, 7, 9)
- Zack Foster – recording assistant (1, 3, 5, 7, 9)
- Anthony Martinez – recording assistant (1, 3, 5, 7, 9)
- Ernesto Olvera – recording assistant (1, 3, 5, 7, 9)
- David Schwerkholt – recording assistant (1, 3, 5, 7, 9)
- Leland Elliott – overdub assistant (1, 3, 5, 7, 9)
- Nick Lane – recording assistant (2, 4, 6, 8, 10–13)
- Taylor Nyquist – recording assistant (2, 4, 6, 8, 10–13)
- Chris Lord-Alge – mixing (1, 3, 5, 7, 9)
- Justin Niebank – mixing (2, 4, 6, 8, 10–13)
- Keith Armstrong – mix assistant (1, 3, 5, 7, 9)
- Nik Karpen – mix assistant (1, 3, 5, 7, 9)
- Drew Bollman – mix assistant (2, 4, 6, 8, 10–13)
- Paul DeCarli – digital editing (1, 3, 5, 7, 9)
- David Huff – digital editing (2, 4, 6, 8, 10–13)
- Adam Ayan – mastering
- Marc VanGool – guitar technician (1, 3, 5, 7, 9)
- Jon Nicholson – drum technician (1, 3, 5, 7, 9)

=== Additional credits ===
- Allison Jones – A&R (1, 3, 5, 7, 9)
- Kelly King – A&R (1, 3, 5, 7, 9)
- Matt Griffin – production coordination (1, 3, 5, 7, 9)
- LeAnn Bennett – production coordination (2, 4, 6, 8, 10–13)
- Mike "Frog" Griffith – production coordination (2, 4, 6, 8, 10–13)
- Sandi Spika Borchetta – art direction
- John Murphy – art direction, wardrobe
- Torne White – graphic design
- Sheryl Nields – photography
- Mellissa Schleicher – hair stylist, make-up

== Charts ==
=== Weekly charts ===
Chart (2014)	Peak position
Australian Albums (ARIA)	17
Canadian Albums (Billboard)	7
UK Country Albums (OCC)	2
US Billboard 200	5
US Top Country Albums (Billboard)	1

=== Year-end charts ===
Chart (2014)	Position
US Billboard 200	107
US Top Country Albums (Billboard)	19
Chart (2015)	Position
US Top Country Albums (Billboard)	74
