= Jay DeMarcus =

American musician (born 1971)

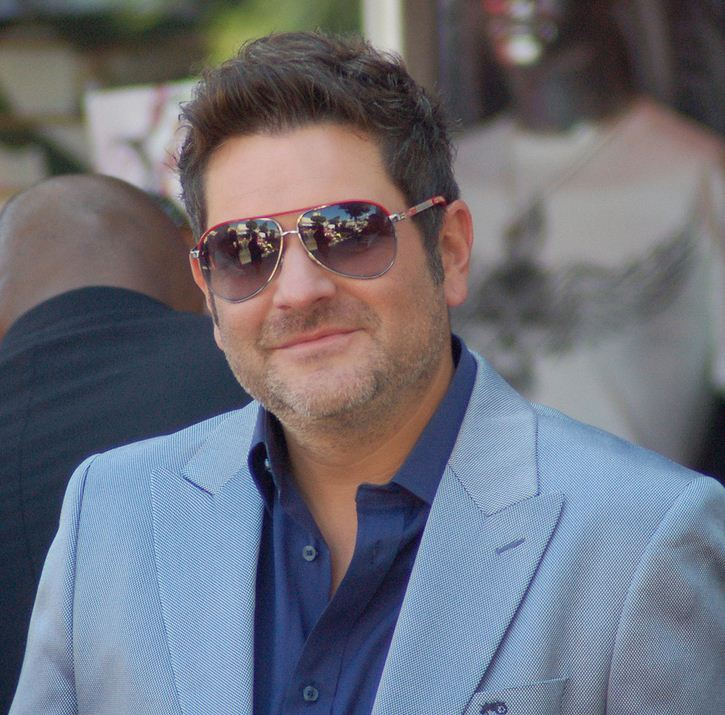
- DeMarcus at a ceremony to receive a star on the Hollywood Walk of Fame in 2012

Background information
- Born: Stanley Wayne DeMarcus Jr. April 26, 1971 (age 55); Columbus, Ohio, U.S.
- Origin: Nashville, Tennessee, U.S.
- Genres: Country, contemporary Christian
- Occupations: Musician, songwriter, producer
- Instruments: Bass guitar, vocals, keyboards, guitar, mandolin, banjo
- Years active: 1992–present
- Labels: Lyric Street, Big Machine
- Member of: Rascal Flatts, Generation Radio
- Formerly of: East to West
- Spouse: Allison Alderson (m. 2004)
- Website: rascalflatts.com

Jay DeMarcus (born Stanley Wayne DeMarcus Jr.; on April 26, 1971) is an American musician, vocalist, record producer and songwriter. He is a member of the country music band Rascal Flatts.

== Early life ==
DeMarcus was born Stanley Wayne DeMarcus Jr. on April 26, 1971, in Columbus, Ohio. He graduated from the Tree of Life Christian Schools and Fort Hayes Metropolitan Education Center in Columbus while living with his mother and sister. He also has a half-sister named Rhonda George (1961–2017) from his father's side of the family. DeMarcus attended Lee College in Cleveland, Tennessee, from 1990 to 1992. At the time, he traveled and performed as a keyboard player in the Christian music group New Harvest, led by Danny Murray.

== Career ==
DeMarcus co-founded the contemporary Christian music group East to West and moved to Nashville, Tennessee, in 1993. In 1997, after East to West disbanded, he called his second cousin, Gary LeVox, with whom he played when they were younger, and convinced him to come to Nashville and provide some harmonies on Michael English's album Gospel, which he was producing. They engineered the album together, and became English's backup band and road manager. The album was nominated for the Dove Award for Inspirational Song of the Year. He soon became bandleader for Chely Wright.

In addition to producing for English, he has also produced albums for James Otto, Jo Dee Messina, Austins Bridge, Chicago and others.

On March 4, 2010, DeMarcus and his band mates were guest stars on CSI: Crime Scene Investigation, appearing as themselves. In the episode titled "Unshockable" (10.14), he is electro-shocked by his bass guitar during a performance at a Vegas club, leaving him with total amnesia which he recovers from at the end of the episode. DeMarcus has continued to explore his acting career, appearing in the film A Country Christmas, as well as episodes of ABC's Nashville and Lifetime's Drop Dead Diva.

In October 2018, DeMarcus founded the label Red Street Records, an independent Christian music label.

== Personal life ==
On May 15, 2004, DeMarcus married Allison Alderson, a former beauty queen who has held the titles Miss Tennessee 1999 and Miss Tennessee USA 2002. DeMarcus met her on the set while filming the video for the Rascal Flatts song, "These Days". Their first child, a daughter, Madeline Leigh, was born in December 2010. In July 2012, he and Allison welcomed son Dylan Jay. He also has another daughter from a previous relationship, whom he placed for adoption because he and his then-girlfriend were not ready to parent the baby.

== Discography ==
=== Rascal Flatts ===
- Rascal Flatts (2000)
- Melt (2002)
- Feels Like Today (2004)
- Me and My Gang (2006)
- Still Feels Good (2007)
- Unstoppable (2009)
- Nothing Like This (2010)
- Changed (2012)
- Rewind (2014)
- The Greatest Gift of All (2016)
- Back to Us (2017)
- Life Is a Highway: Refueled Duets (2025)

=== Generation Radio ===
- Generation Radio (2022)
- Take 2 (2026)

=== East to West ===
- East to West (1993)
- North of the Sky (1995)

== Non-Rascal Flatts album credits ==
Year	Album	Artist	Credit
1998	Gospel	Michael English	Producer, engineer, bass, acoustic guitar
2003	Some Things Never Change	Mark Lowry	Keyboards
2006	She Was Country When Country Wasn't Cool: Tribute to Barbara Mandrell	Various artists	Bass
2006	Ten	Brian McKnight	Bass, piano
2006	Whatever We Wanna	LeAnn Rimes	Bass
2006	Chicago XXX	Chicago	Producer, arranger, engineer, guitar, keyboards, vocals
2008	Sunset Man	James Otto	Producer, bass
2008	The Prodigal Comes Home	Michael English	Arranger, vocal producer
2010	Unmistakable: Love	Jo Dee Messina	Producer
2010	Times Like These	Austins Bridge	Producer
2011	New Day	The Martins	Producer, vocal arrangement, guitar, keyboards
2012	New to This Town	Kix Brooks	Producer
2012	Tuskegee	Lionel Richie	Bass
2012	Jennette McCurdy	Jennette McCurdy	Producer
2012	iCarly: iSoundtrack II [Original TV Soundtrack]	Various artists	Producer
2012	Brighter One	Marshall Hall	Producer, electric guitar
2013	Alabama & Friends	Alabama	Producer, bass
2013	Love Is Stronger	Jason Crabb	Producer, bass
2013	Some People Change	Michael English	Producer, engineer, bass
2013	Surrender	Adam Crabb	Bass
2014	Nashville Outlaws: A Tribute to Mötley Crüe	Various artists	Producer, bass, piano
2017	Sing It Now Songs of Hope & Faith	Reba McEntire	Producer
2019	Here I Am	Jason Scheff	Producer, bass, vocals
2022	“Generation Radio”	Jason Scheff Steve Ferrone Chris Rodriguez Tom Yankton	Singer, Keyboards, Bass

== Filmography ==
Film and television appearances
Year	Title	Role	Notes
2006	Yes, Dear	Himself	Episode: "The Limo"
2009	Hannah Montana: The Movie	Rascal Flatts	
2010	CSI: Crime Scene Investigation	Himself	Episode: "Unshockable"
2013	A Country Christmas	Chim Ritchels	
2014	Drop Dead Diva	Trevor	Episode: "First Date"
2015	Nashville	Himself	Episode: "Forever and for Always"
2016	Sharknado: The 4th Awakens	Zimmerman, Shark World Hotel manager	TV movie
2018	Chrisley Knows Best	Himself	Episode: "No Men For Old Country"
2020	DeMarcus Family Rules	Himself	
2025	The Legend of Van Dorn	General Ulysses S. Grant	Historical drama film

== Awards and nominations for producing ==
Year	Association	Category	Work	Result
1999	GMA Dove Awards	Inspirational Album of the Year	Gospel – Michael English	Nominated
2011	Grammy Awards	Best Southern, Country, or Bluegrass Gospel Album	Times Like These – Austins Bridge	Nominated
2013	GMA Dove Awards	Southern Gospel Album of the Year	Love Is Stronger – Jason Crabb	Won
2014	GMA Dove Awards	Southern Gospel Performance of the Year	"Love Is Stronger" – Jason Crabb	Nominated
2014	GMA Dove Awards	Inspirational Album of the Year	Four:Twelve – No Other Name	Nominated
