= SHeDAISY discography =

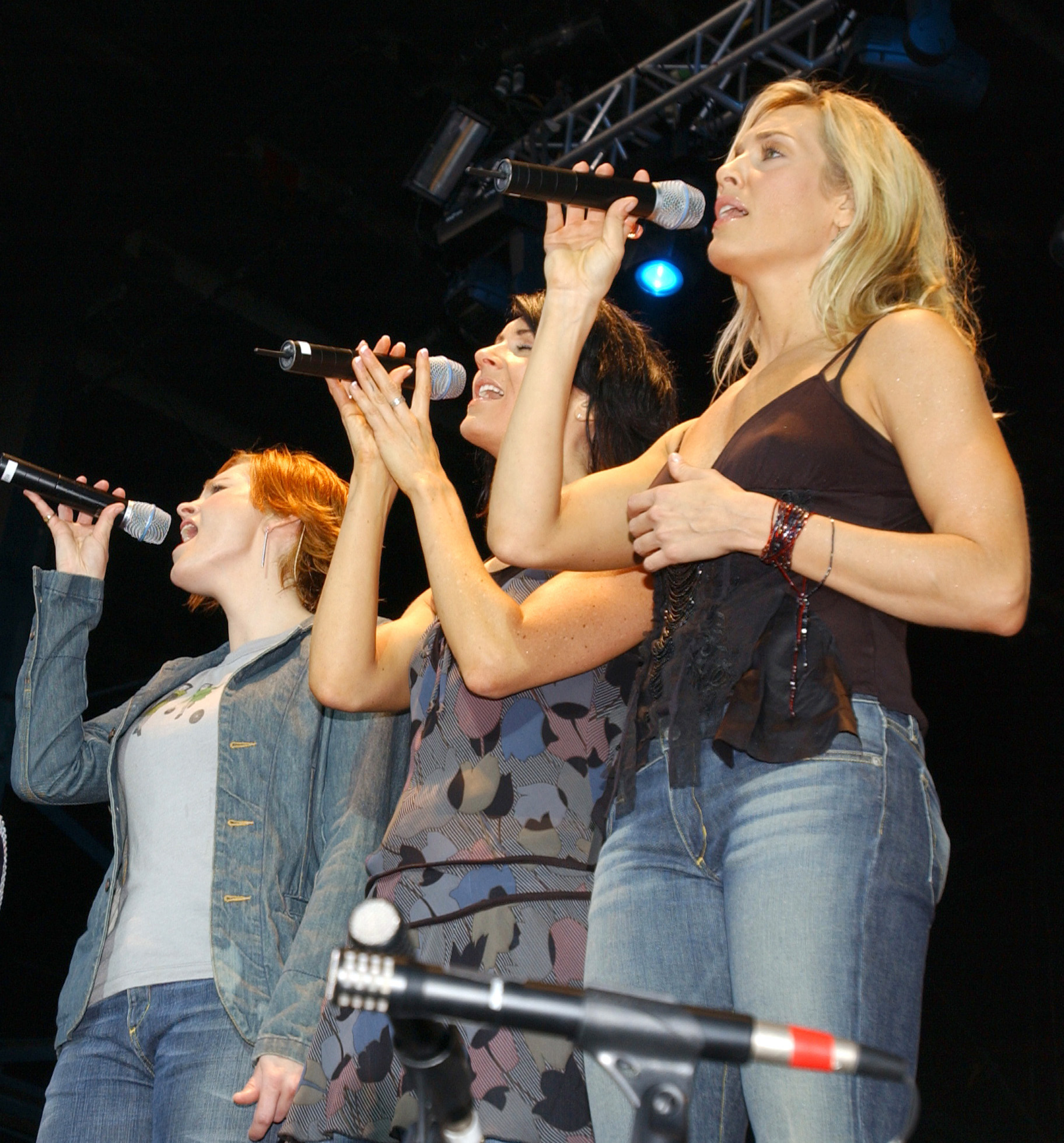
- SHeDAISY in 2004
- Studio albums: 5
- Compilation albums: 1
- Singles: 14
- Music videos: 14
- Remix albums: 1

American country music group SHeDAISY released fourteen singles, five studio albums counting a Christmas album, one compilation album, and one remix album. All of their content was released through Lyric Street Records, a former division of Disney Music Group. Of the trio's albums, 1999's The Whole SHeBANG is certified platinum by the Recording Industry Association of America, and 2004's Sweet Right Here is certified gold. Four of the group's singles have reached the top ten on the Billboard Hot Country Songs chart, with the highest being the number two hit "I Will… But" from 2000.

== Albums ==
=== Studio albums ===
Title	Album details	Peak positions			Certifications (sales threshold)
Title	Album details	US	US Country	CAN Country	Certifications (sales threshold)
The Whole SHeBANG	Release date: May 11, 1999; Label: Lyric Street Records; Formats: CD, cassette, download	70	6	4	US: Platinum
Brand New Year	Release date: September 26, 2000; Label: Lyric Street Records; Formats: CD, cassette, download	92	10	—	
Knock on the Sky	Release date: June 25, 2002; Label: Lyric Street Records; Formats: CD, download	23	3	—	
Sweet Right Here	Release date: June 8, 2004; Label: Lyric Street Records; Formats: CD, download	16	2	—	US: Gold
Fortuneteller's Melody	Release date: March 14, 2006; Label: Lyric Street Records; Formats: CD, download	22	6	—	
"—" denotes releases that did not chart

=== Compilation albums ===
Title	Album details	Peak positions
Title	Album details	US Country
The Best of SHeDAISY	Release date: February 5, 2008; Label: Lyric Street Records; Formats: CD, download	54

=== Remix albums ===
Title	Album details	Peak positions
Title	Album details	US Country
The Whole SHeBANG: All Mixed Up	Release date: September 25, 2001; Label: Lyric Street Records; Formats: CD, download	30

== Singles ==
Year	Title	Peak positions			Album
Year	Title	US	US Country	CAN Country	Album
1999	"Little Good-Byes"	43	3	13	The Whole SHeBANG
1999	"This Woman Needs"	57	9	18	The Whole SHeBANG
2000	"I Will... But"	43	2	3	The Whole SHeBANG
2000	"Lucky 4 You (Tonight I'm Just Me)"	79	11	—	The Whole SHeBANG
2001	"Still Holding Out for You"	—	27	—	The Whole SHeBANG
2002	"Get Over Yourself"	—	27	—	Knock on the Sky
2002	"Mine All Mine"	—	28	—	Knock on the Sky
2004	"Passenger Seat"	66	12	15	Sweet Right Here
2004	"Come Home Soon"	75	14	—	Sweet Right Here
2005	"Don't Worry 'bout a Thing"	59	7	13	Sweet Right Here
2005	"God Bless the Canadian Housewife" (Note: "God Bless the Canadian Housewife", a rewrite of the song "God Bless the American Housewife", is only available on the Canadian edition of the Desperate Housewives soundtrack.)	—	—	19	Music from and Inspired by Desperate Housewives
2005	"I'm Taking the Wheel"	— (Note: "I'm Taking the Wheel" did not enter the Hot 100, but peaked at number 14 on Bubbling Under Hot 100 Singles, which acts as a 25-song extension of the Hot 100.)	21	—	Fortuneteller's Melody
2006	"In Terms of Love"	—	32	—	Fortuneteller's Melody
2009	"Bucket Full of Beautiful"	—	—	—	—N/a
"—" denotes releases that did not chart

=== Christmas singles ===
Year	Title	Peak positions		Album
Year	Title	US	US Country	Album
1999	"Deck the Halls"	61	37 (Note: "Deck the Halls" charted at number 40 on Hot Country Songs in 1999, and re-entered at number 37 the following year.)	Brand New Year
2000	"Jingle Bells"	—	44	Brand New Year
"—" denotes releases that did not chart

== Music videos ==
Year	Title	Director
1999	"Little Good-Byes"	David Hogan
1999	"This Woman Needs"	David Hogan
1999	"Deck the Halls"	David Hogan
2000	"I Will… But"	Shaun Silva
2000	"Lucky 4 You (Tonight I'm Just Me)"	Morgan Lawley
2001	"What Child Is This"	Ritch Sublett/Paul Reeves
2002	"Get Over Yourself"	Lisa Mann
2002	"Mine All Mine"	Brent Hedgecock
2004	"Passenger Seat"	Kristin Barlowe
2004	"Come Home Soon"	Steven Goldmann
2005	"Don't Worry 'bout a Thing"	Trey Fanjoy
2005	"God Bless the American Housewife"	Marcus Raboy
2006	"I'm Taking the Wheel"	Trey Fanjoy
2006	"In Terms of Love"	Andrew MacNaughtan
