= The Best of SHeDAISY =

Greatest hits album by SHeDAISY
- Released: February 5, 2008
- Recorded: 1999–2006
- Genre: Country
- Length: 42:51
- Label: Lyric Street
- Producer: Dann Huff; John Shanks; SHeDAISY

SHeDAISY chronology
Fortuneteller's Melody (2006)	The Best of SHeDAISY (2008)

Professional ratings
Review scores
Source	Rating
Allmusic	3.5/5 stars

The Best of SHeDAISY is the first greatest hits album by American country music group SHeDAISY. It was released on February 5, 2008, via Lyric Street Records. The compilation comprises nearly all of their singles from their four studio albums alongside the song "God Bless the American Housewife" from the Desperate Housewives soundtrack; the 2001 single "Still Holding Out for You" does not appear on the album.

== Track listing ==
Dann Huff produced tracks 1–9, John Shanks produced tracks 10–12, and SHeDAISY co-produced tracks 5–9

Original release
No.	Title	Writer(s)	Original album(s)	Length
1.	"Little Good-Byes"	Kenny Greenberg; Kristyn Osborn; Jason Deere	The Whole SHeBANG	3:20
2.	"This Woman Needs"	Connie Harrington; Bonnie Baker; Osborn	The Whole SHeBANG	3:20
3.	"I Will… But"	Osborn; Deere	The Whole SHeBANG	3:40
4.	"Lucky 4 You (Tonight I'm Just Me)"	Coley McCabe; Osborn; Deere	The Whole SHeBANG	4:00
5.	"Get Over Yourself"	Marcus Hummon; Osborn	Knock on the Sky	3:25
6.	"Mine All Mine" (*)	Hollie Poole; Osborn	Knock on the Sky	3:57
7.	"Passenger Seat"	Osborn; Harrington	Sweet Right Here	3:25
8.	"Come Home Soon"	Osborn; John Shanks	Sweet Right Here	4:03
9.	"Don't Worry 'bout a Thing"	Osborn; Deere	Sweet Right Here	3:36
10.	"I'm Taking the Wheel"	Shanks; Osborn	Fortuneteller's Melody	3:14
11.	"In Terms of Love"	Don Schlitz; Osborn	Fortuneteller's Melody	3:41
12.	"God Bless the American Housewife"	Jann Arden; Russell Broom	Music from and Inspired by Desperate Housewives and Fortuneteller's Melody	3:10
Total length:				42:51

*On music streaming services and digital editions of the album, "Mine All Mine" is replaced with the album track "23 Days" from Fortuneteller's Melody.

== Charts ==
Chart (2008)	Peak position
US Top Country Albums (Billboard)	54
