= Knock on the Sky =

Studio album by SHeDAISY
- Released: June 25, 2002
- Studios: The Bennett House and Sound Kitchen (Franklin, Tennessee); Emerald Entertainment and Ocean Way Nashville (Nashville, Tennessee)
- Genre: Country
- Length: 73:40
- Label: Lyric Street
- Producers: Dann Huff; SHeDAISY

SHeDAISY chronology
| The Whole SHeBANG: All Mixed Up (2001) | Knock on the Sky (2002) | Sweet Right Here (2004) |

Singles from Knock on the Sky
- 1. "Get Over Yourself" Released: March 9, 2002; 2. "Mine All Mine" Released: May 25, 2002

Professional ratings
Review scores
| Source | Rating |
|---|---|
| Allmusic - | 4/5 stars |
| Rolling Stone | (favorable) |

Knock on the Sky is the third studio album by American country music trio SHeDAISY. It was released on June 25, 2002. The two singles from this album, "Get Over Yourself" and "Mine All Mine", were minor Top 30 hits on the country charts. "Mine All Mine" was also featured on the soundtrack for the 2002 film Sweet Home Alabama and featured a video including clips from the movie.

This was SHeDAISY's weakest selling album as well; given its poor reception to radio, the group has referred to it as being "ahead of its time".

"Mine All Mine" was previously a single for Canadian country singer Tara Lyn Hart, released on her self-titled album in 1999.

== Track listing ==
All tracks are written by Kristyn Osborn; co-writers as indicated.

| No. | Title | Writer(s) | Length |
|---|---|---|---|
| 1. | "Mine All Mine" | Hollie Poole | 3:57 |
| 2. | "I'm Lit" | Connie Harrington | 3:26 |
| 3. | "Man Goin' Down" | Rick Neigher, Melanie Doane | 5:02 |
| 4. | "Get Over Yourself" | Marcus Hummon | 3:24 |
| 5. | "Rush" | Hummon | 3:27 |
| 6. | "I Wish I Were the Rain" | Hummon | 4:30 |
| 7. | "Repent" | Hummon | 4:21 |
| 8. | "Everybody Wants You" | Connie Harrington | 4:46 |
| 9. | "Now" | Trey Bruce | 4:18 |
| 10. | "All Over You" | Osborn, Richard Marx | 4:30 |
| 11. | "The First to Let Go" | | 4:27 |
| 12. | "Turn Me On" | Jason Deere | 3:24 |
| 13. | "Keep Me/Knock on the Sky" (Keep Me ends at 5:24. ^{A}Knock on the Sky is a Hidden track beginning at 20:19 and runs 3:45.) | Osborn/^{A}Osborn, Harrington | 24:04 |
| 14. | "(Silence)" | | 0:04 |
| Total length: | | | 73:40 |

== Personnel ==
SHeDAISY

- Kassidy Osborn – lead vocals
- Kelsi Osborn – backing vocals
- Kristyn Osborn – backing vocals

Musicians

- Tim Akers – keyboards
- Steve Nathan – keyboards (13)
- Dann Huff – electric guitar
- B. James Lowry – acoustic guitar
- Jerry McPherson – electric guitar (1–7, 10–13)
- Gordon Kennedy – electric guitar (2, 7)
- John Willis – acoustic guitar (5, 10)
- J.T. Corenflos – electric guitar (8, 9)
- Paul Franklin – steel guitar
- Jonathan Yudkin – banjo, mandocello, mandolin, fiddle, cello, viola
- Glenn Worf – bass (1–4, 6–13)
- Jimmie Lee Sloas – bass (5)
- Steve Brewster – drums (1, 3–10, 12, 13)
- Joel Stevenett – drums (2, 11)
- Eric Darken – percussion

=== Production ===
- Doug Howard – A&R direction
- Dann Huff – producer
- SHeDAISY – producers
- Jeff Balding – recording, mixing
- Mark Hagen – additional recording
- David Bryant – recording assistant, mix assistant
- Jed Hackett – recording assistant, mix assistant
- David Streit – recording assistant, mix assistant
- Christopher Rowe – digital editing
- Robert Hadley – mastering
- Doug Sax – mastering
- The Mastering Lab (Hollywood, California) – mastering location
- Mike "Frog" Griffith – production coordinator
- Sherri Halford – art direction
- Greg McCarn – art direction
- Glenn Sweitzer – design
- Marina Chavez – photography
- Cindy Wunsch – management

== Charts ==
=== Weekly charts ===
| Chart (2002) | Peak position |
|---|---|
| US Billboard 200 | 23 |
| US Top Country Albums (Billboard) | 3 |

=== Year-end charts ===
| Chart (2002) | Position |
|---|---|
| US Top Country Albums (Billboard) | 51 |
