= Lucky 4 You (Tonight I'm Just Me) =

Single by SHeDAISY

from the album The Whole SHeBANG
- Released: October 16, 2000
- Recorded: 1999
- Genre: Country pop
- Length: 4:00
- Label: Lyric Street
- Songwriters: Coley McCabe; Kristyn Osborn; Jason Deere
- Producer: Dann Huff

SHeDAISY singles chronology
"I Will… But" (2000)	"Lucky 4 You (Tonight I'm Just Me)" (2000)	"Still Holding Out for You" (2001)

"Lucky 4 You (Tonight I'm Just Me)" is a song written by Kristyn Osborn, Coley McCabe and Jason Deere, and recorded by American country music group SHeDAISY. It was released on October 16, 2000 as the fourth single from their album The Whole SHeBANG.

== Content ==
The song, told from her point of view, describes the varying emotional reactions of a woman in the aftermath of a relationship, ended by her partner. Though it is not clear whether serious or made simply in jest, the theme of the song suggests that the woman has dissociative identity disorder. Her reactions range from passive forgiveness to extreme anger as she talks to her former partner at a party where he is accompanied by a new woman.

== Track listing ==
Album sampler promo CD
No.	Title	Writer(s)	Length
1.	"Lucky 4 You (Tonight I'm Just Me)"	Coley McCabe; Kristyn Osborn; Jason Deere	4:00
2.	"Little Good-Byes"	Kenny Greenberg; Osborn; Deere	3:20
3.	"Little Good-Byes" (Extended Energy Mix)	Greenberg; Osborn; Deere	3:49
4.	"This Woman Needs"	Connie Harrington; Bonnie Baker; Osborn	3:21
5.	"This Woman Needs" (Acoustic Version)	Harrington; Baker; Osborn	3:21
6.	"I Will… But"	Osborn; Deere	3:42

== Charts ==
"Lucky 4 You (Tonight I'm Just Me)" debuted at number 70 on the U.S. Billboard Hot Country Singles & Tracks for the week of September 23, 2000.

Chart (2000–2001)	Peak position
US Country Top 50 (Radio & Records)	10
US Hot Country Songs (Billboard)	11
US Billboard Hot 100	79

=== Year-end charts ===
Chart (2001)	Position
US Country Songs (Billboard)	55

== Release history ==
Release dates and format(s) for "Lucky 4 You (Tonight I'm Just Me)"
Region	Date	Format(s)	Label(s)	Ref.
United States	October 16, 2000	Country radio	Lyric Street	
