= Fortuneteller's Melody =

Studio album by SHeDAISY
- Released: March 14, 2006
- Recorded: mid-2005 to December 2005
- Studios: Starstruck Studios (Nashville, Tennessee); Henson Recording Studios (Hollywood, California)
- Genre: Country
- Length: 46:58
- Label: Lyric Street
- Producer: John Shanks

SHeDAISY chronology
Sweet Right Here (2004)	Fortuneteller's Melody (2006)	The Best of SHeDAISY (2008)

Singles from Sweet Right Here
- 1. "I'm Taking the Wheel" Released: November 14, 2005; 2. "In Terms of Love" Released: May 15, 2006

Professional ratings
Review scores
Source	Rating
Allmusic	4/5 stars

Fortuneteller's Melody is the fifth and final studio album by American country music trio SHeDAISY. It was released on March 14, 2006. The two singles from Fortuneteller's Melody, "I'm Taking the Wheel" and "In Terms of Love", reached 22 and 32 on the country charts. "God Bless the American Housewife" (retitled "God Bless the Canadian Housewife") was released as a single in Canada, where it charted in the Top 20.

== Track listing ==
No.	Title	Writer(s)	Length
1.	"23 Days"	Kristyn Osborn, Jason Deere	3:31
2.	"Whatever It Takes"	Sheryl Crow, John Shanks, Osborn	3:24
3.	"Bring It On Back"	Connie Harrington, Osborn	3:47
4.	"I'm Taking the Wheel"	Shanks, Osborn	3:14
5.	"God Bless the American Housewife"	Jann Arden, Russell Broom	3:10^{A}
6.	"Kickin' In"	Shanks, Osborn	4:05
7.	"Healing Side"	Crow, Shanks, Osborn	4:19
8.	"What Do I Do Now"	Harrington, Nichols, Osborn	4:12
9.	"In Terms of Love"	Don Schlitz, Osborn	3:41
10.	"Burn Down the House"	Deere, Osborn	3:58
11.	"Out of My Mind"	Shanks, Osborn	3:19
12.	"She Gets What I Deserve"	Harrington, Osborn	3:23

^{A}Song was re-recorded as "God Bless the Canadian Housewife" on Canadian releases.

== Personnel ==
SHeDAISY

- Kassidy Osborn – backing vocals
- Kelsi Osborn – lead vocals
- Kristyn Osborn – backing vocals

Musicians

- Jamie Muhoberac – keyboards, acoustic piano
- John Shanks – keyboards, acoustic guitars, electric guitars, bass
- Dan Dugmore – dobro, pedal steel guitar
- Greg Leisz – pedal steel guitar
- Jonathan Yudkin – banjo, mandolin, cello, viola, violin, string arrangements
- Jeff Rothschild – drums

=== Production ===
- Randy Goodman –A&R direction
- Doug Howard – A&R direction
- John Shanks – producer, mixing
- Jeff Rothschild – engineer, mixing
- Aaron Kasdorf – engineer
- Lars Fox – digital editing
- Stewart Whitmore – digital editing
- Stephen Marcussen – mastering at Marcussen Mastering (Hollywood, California)
- Shari Sutcliffe – production coordinator, music contractor
- Sherri Halford – art direction
- Greg McCarn – art direction
- Glenn Sweitzer – art direction, design
- Kristin Barlowe – photography
- Leiane Taylor – make-up
- Daniel Caudill – wardrobe

== Charts ==
=== Weekly charts ===
Chart (2006)	Peak position
US Billboard 200	22
US Top Country Albums (Billboard)	6

=== Year-end charts ===
Chart (2006)	Position
US Top Country Albums (Billboard)	70
