= SHeDAISY =

American country music group

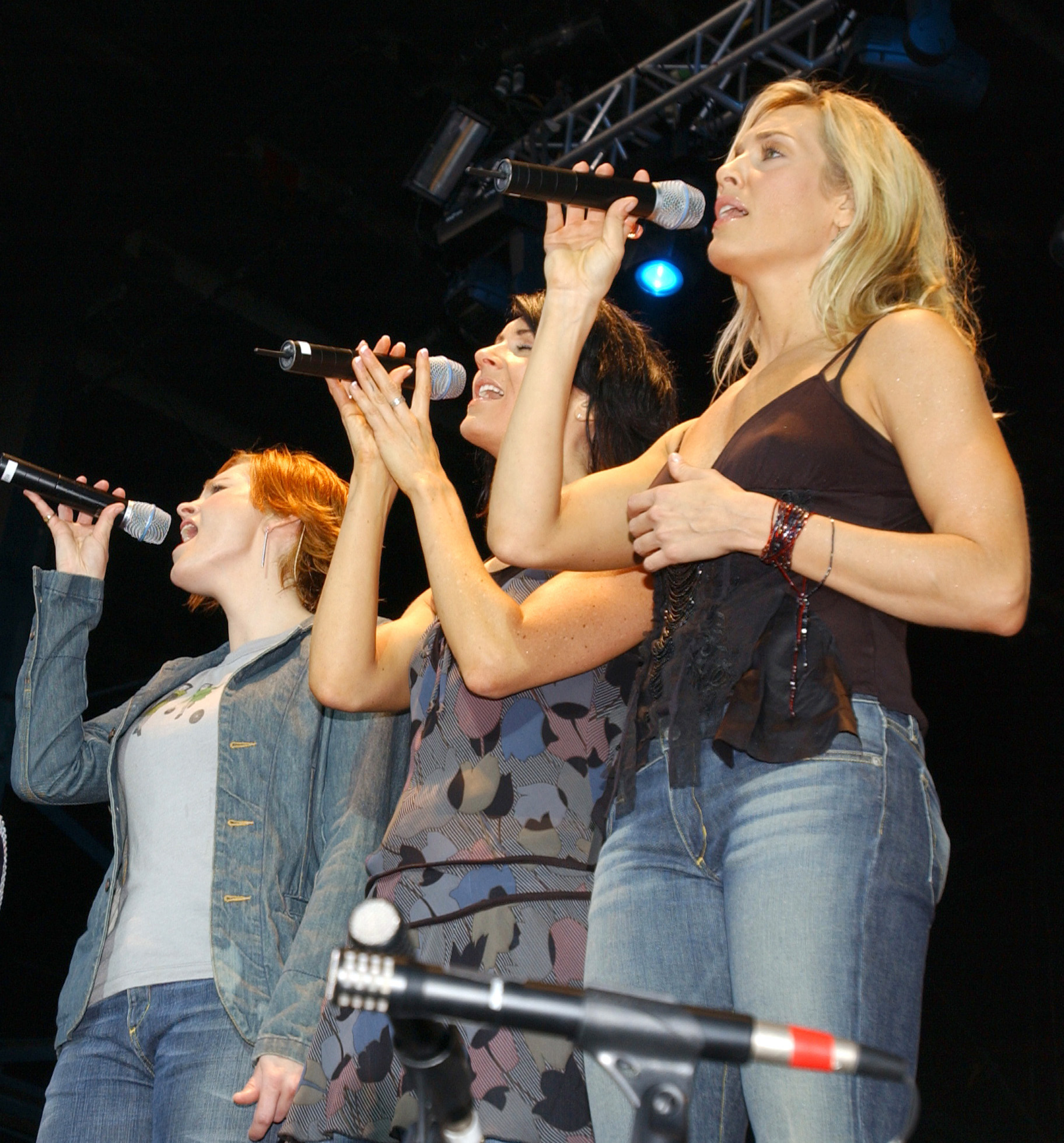
- SHeDAISY performing at Sandstone Amphitheater in 2004 (L–R: Kelsi, Kassidy, Kristyn)

Background information
- Also known as: The Osborn Sisters; The Violets
- Origin: Magna, Utah, U.S.
- Genre: Country
- Years active: 1989–2010
- Labels: RCA Nashville; Lyric Street
- Past members: Kassidy Osborn; Kelsi Osborn; Kristyn Osborn

SHeDAISY (/ʃəˈdeɪzi/), originally the Osborn Sisters, was an American country music vocal group from Magna, Utah. The group consisted of sisters Kassidy, Kelsi, and Kristyn Osborn. Kassidy was the lead vocalist, and Kristyn the lead songwriter. Their name was derived from a Navajo term meaning 'my little sister'.

The sisters were involved in music since their childhood, and recorded an unreleased album for RCA Records Nashville in the early 1990s. At the end of the decade they began using the name SHeDAISY, and signed with Lyric Street Records who released their debut album The Whole SHeBANG in 1999. A year later they recorded a Christmas project Brand New Year, followed by studio albums Knock on the Sky (2002), Sweet Right Here (2004), and Fortuneteller's Melody (2006). The Whole SHeBANG is certified platinum by the Recording Industry Association of America (RIAA), and Sweet Right Here certified gold.

SHeDAISY has fifteen entries on the Billboard Hot Country Songs charts. Their top-ten hits on this chart are "Little Good-Byes," "This Woman Needs", "I Will... But" (their highest, with a peak of number two), and "Don't Worry 'bout a Thing". Their sound is defined by Kristyn's songwriting, country pop influences, and vocal harmony, with mixed reception for the production style of their albums and the nature of their lyrics. Many critics compared the group's sound to the Dixie Chicks (now the Chicks).

== History ==
Sisters Kristyn (born August 24, 1970), Kelsi (born November 21, 1974), and Kassidy Osborn (born October 30, 1976) were all born and raised in Magna, Utah. They are all the children of David and Robyn Osborn. All three sisters were involved in music since childhood. In July 1987, Kelsi was booked to play the title role in a production of Annie at the Sundance Resort summer theater. All three Osborn sisters also performed at a number of talent shows and other events, including the National Finals Rodeo, along with singing "The Star-Spangled Banner" at Utah Jazz basketball games and performing for residents of assisted-living facilities. Kelsi attended a competition at the former Cottonwood Mall in Holladay, Utah, held by the television network Showtime in October 1988, to select youth hosts for a special programming block. The network declared her one of four top winners in March 1989. This competition required David to travel with Kelsi to New York City; he chose to take Kristyn and Kassidy along, as he thought doing so would familiarize all of them with show business. According to him, the trip inspired Kristyn to begin performing full-time. Specifically, she wanted to perform country music as she had just bought an album by Restless Heart. Further inspiring the sisters was the family's perception that country music at the time did not have a significant number of female groups or teenagers.

The sisters' combined interest in country music led David to take Kristyn, Kelsi, and Kassidy to Nashville, Tennessee, later in 1989 with the intent of beginning their careers in the genre. The family would then commute regularly between Utah and Nashville so the sisters could finish attending school. He had them record demos with the intent of signing them to a record label. One such demo led to them being signed by RCA Records Nashville in 1991. At the time, the trio called themselves the Osborn Sisters. The three sisters began recording songs under the production of Rob Galbraith, best known for his work with Ronnie Milsap, and also performed a concert at their local high school with him in attendance. Although they completed an album for RCA, it was never released and they left the label. The sisters later stated dissatisfaction with their material, as well as concerns that they were unpreprared to start a professional music career, as the reasons behind the RCA album's cancellation.

After leaving RCA, the three Osborn sisters continued to live in the same apartment in Nashville while performing at various local nightclubs. They supported themselves financially by working at department stores at the former Hickory Hollow Mall in the Nashville suburb of Antioch. Kristyn also attended Middle Tennessee State University to educate herself on music business management. They briefly renamed themselves the Violets before choosing the name SHeDAISY (/ʃəˈdeɪzi/). This name was inspired by their brother-in-law, who worked as a missionary among the Navajo and referred to the sisters by the Navajo language term shedaisa, which means "my little sister". Kristyn had also begun writing songs with Jason Deere, a Nashville-based songwriter the sisters had befriended. With Deere's assistance, they sent demo recordings to multiple Nashville-based record labels. One demo was sent to Shelby Kennedy, who worked in artists and repertoire for Lyric Street Records, then a new country music division of Disney Music Group. By early 1998, they were signed to the label.

=== 1999–2001: The Whole SHeBANG and Brand New Year ===
Lyric Street released SHeDAISY's debut album The Whole SHeBANG on May 11, 1999. Kristyn co-wrote all eleven of its songs. Dann Huff produced the album and also alternated with Shelby's brother Gordon on electric guitar. Other musicians on the project included bassist Mike Brignardello (with whom Huff previously recorded in the band Giant), drummers Vinnie Colaiuta and Paul Leim, steel guitar players Dan Dugmore and Paul Franklin, and mandolin player Jonathan Yudkin. "Little Good-Byes", co-written with Deere and Kenny Greenberg, was the lead single. By the middle of the year, this song peaked at number three on the U.S. Billboard Hot Country Singles & Tracks (now called Hot Country Songs) chart and 43 on the Billboard Hot 100. Afterward, "This Woman Needs" also became a top-ten hit on the country charts by year's end. It was followed by "I Will... But", which accounted for their highest country music peak of number two in 2000. Like "Little Good-Byes", it also peaked at 43 on the Hot 100. Following this song was "Lucky 4 You (Tonight I'm Just Me)" with a Billboard country peak of number eleven. Both "I Will... But" and "Lucky 4 You" were also co-written by Deere, with Coley McCabe also assisting on the latter. The last single off the album, "Still Holding Out for You", was co-written by Richard Marx and was a minor Hot Country Songs chart hit in 2001. Before being issued as a single, it was the B-side of "Little Good-Byes".

Stephen Thomas Erlewine of AllMusic thought the album's sound was closer to pop than country, but praised the "well-crafted, melodic, memorable songs" as well as the sisters' vocal harmonies. Paul Verna opined similarly in a review for Billboard. On March 28, 2000, the Recording Industry Association of America (RIAA) awarded The Whole SHeBANG a platinum certification for shipments of one million copies in the United States. In 2000, SHeDAISY was nominated for the Horizon Award (now Best New Artist) by the Country Music Association. SHeDAISY were also nominated for Top New Vocal Duet or Group at the 1999 Academy of Country Music awards. At the 42nd Annual Grammy Awards in 2000, "Little Good-Byes" was nominated in the category of Best Country Performance by a Duo or Group with Vocal.

At the end of 2000, the trio released an album of Christmas music titled Brand New Year. The album included a mix of traditional Christmas songs and new content. One original track, "Twist of the Magi", featured guest vocals from Rascal Flatts, who were also signed to Lyric Street at the time. The album's rendition of "Deck the Halls" had previously appeared in the 1999 direct-to-video animated film Mickey's Once Upon a Christmas and was issued as a promotional Christmas single at the end of that year. This promotion helped the song enter both the country music and Hot 100 charts at the end of 1999 due to seasonal sales and airplay. Upon the release of Brand New Year in 2000, the "Deck the Halls" rendition entered the country charts a second time, with the album's version of "Jingle Bells" also appearing on the charts. AllMusic writer Maria Konicki Dinoia praised the originality of the group's covers on this project, and compared the harmonies on the original track "Santa's Got a Brand New Bag" to those of the Andrews Sisters. The Christmas album was followed in 2001 by a remix album of The Whole SHeBANG titled The Whole SHeBANG: All Mixed Up. Dinoia panned the project's remixes for sounding too similar to the original album.

=== 2002–2003: Knock on the Sky ===
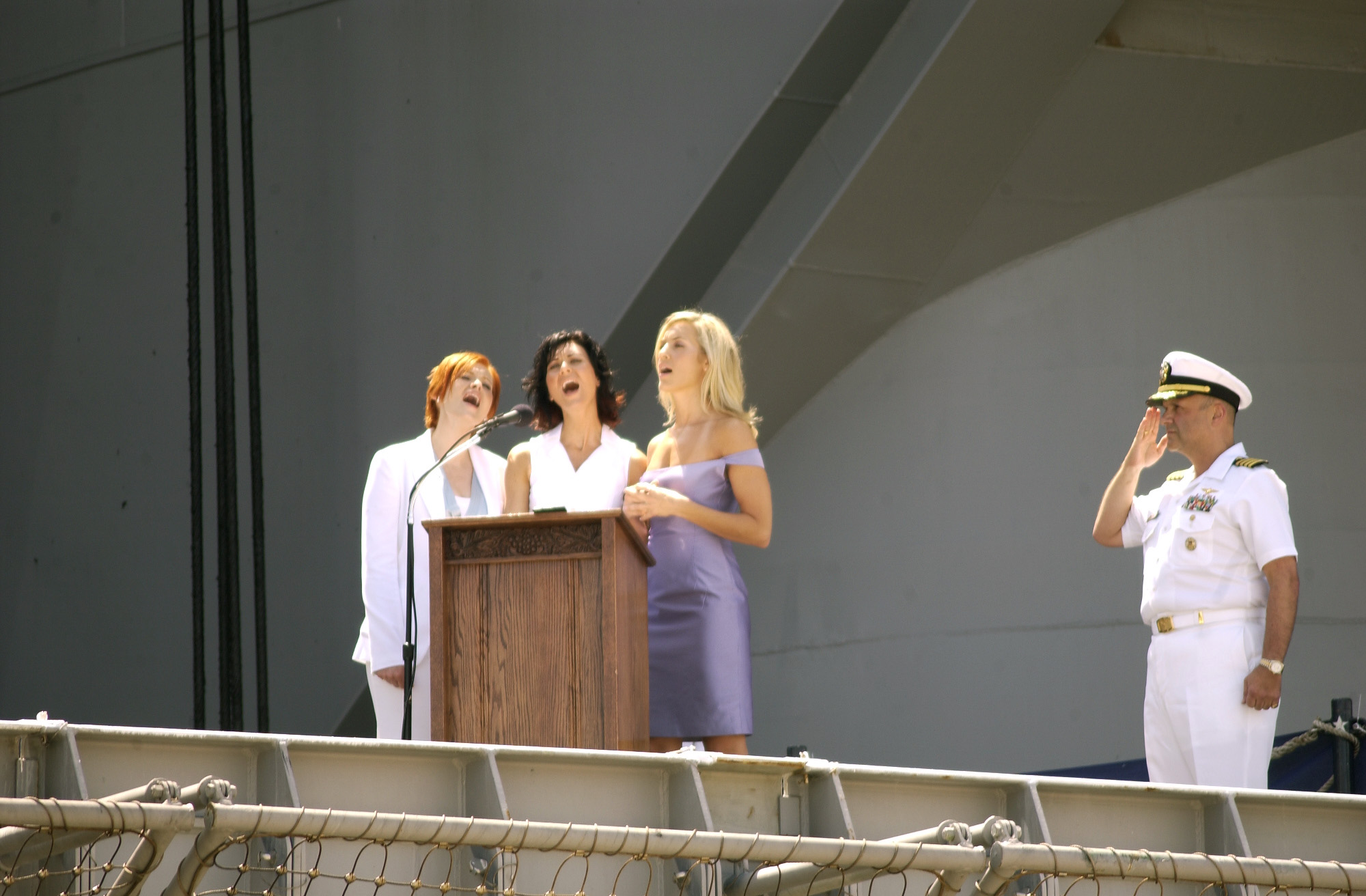
SHeDAISY singing "The Star-Spangled Banner" during opening ceremonies for the official homeporting of the USS Ronald Reagan on July 23, 2004

In mid-2002, SHeDAISY released their second studio album Knock on the Sky. Kristyn noted that the group wanted to make a more "mature" album than the first one. Unlike The Whole SHeBANG, they assisted Huff with production. Its lead single was "Get Over Yourself", co-written by Marcus Hummon. A number of radio station programmers refused to play the song due to concerns over its lyrics being misandristic, leading Lyric Street to withdraw it as a single. As a result, it fell from a peak of number 27 on Hot Country Singles & Tracks, and "Mine All Mine" was chosen as a replacement. To promote the change, Lyric Street's promotion department sent spatulas to radio stations to encourage them to "flip" the single. Canadian country singer Tara Lyn Hart had previously cut "Mine All Mine" for her self-titled debut album in 1999, and SHeDAISY's rendition was also on the soundtrack of the Reese Witherspoon movie Sweet Home Alabama. Despite the change in singles, "Mine All Mine" was unsuccessful on the country charts as well.

Critical reception to Knock on the Sky was mixed. Robert L. Doerschuk noted the "cinematic touches" of the production, such as the use of string sections on certain songs and the use of sound effects on songs such as "Repent". Jack Leaver of The Grand Rapids Press rated the project three-and-a-half stars out of four, praising the song lyrics and "gorgeous sonic landscape" of the production. Tucson Citizen writer A.J. Flick thought the album was well-produced but did not think its sound was country. Writing for Billboard, Ray Waddell called most of the songs "well-written" but found much of the production distracting and lacking in influence from country music. Kristyn later called the album a "science experiment" due to its heavily layered production, an aspect which she thought led to the album's mixed reception.

=== 2004–2005: Sweet Right Here ===
SHeDAISY returned to the Billboard country music charts in 2004 with "Passenger Seat", which reached number twelve. This was the lead single to their third Lyric Street album, Sweet Right Here. Afterward came another top-20 country hit in "Come Home Soon". Kristyn wrote this song with John Shanks, and said it was inspired by a story she had heard about a friend's husband who was declared missing in action during the Iraq War. Last single "Don't Worry 'bout a Thing" peaked at number seven. Once again, Huff played lead guitar and co-produced with the group, and Kristyn co-wrote every song. Allmusic writer Johnny Loftus thought that the tracks co-written with Deere, such as "Don't Worry 'bout a Thing", were the strongest due to their lyrical details. His review praised the sisters' harmonies, although he also considered "Come Home Soon" to be "blah" and other tracks to be "filler". Waddell noted that the production was more country in nature than the previous two albums, particularly in its use of fiddle and banjo; he also thought "Passenger Seat" had influences of Celtic music due to its rhythms. Sweet Right Here was certified gold in the United States in October 2005, for shipments of 500,000 copies.

At the end of 2005, SHeDAISY recorded the original song "God Bless the American Housewife" for the compilation album Music from and Inspired by Desperate Housewives, a soundtrack to the television series Desperate Housewives. Canadian singer Jann Arden co-wrote the song. A version with the title altered to "God Bless the Canadian Housewife" was also released in Canada, and reached top 20 on the Canadian country music charts then published by Radio & Records.

=== 2006–2008: Fortuneteller's Melody ===
After "God Bless the Canadian Housewife", the trio released "I'm Taking the Wheel", the lead single to their fourth studio album Fortuneteller's Melody. The single peaked at 21 on the Billboard country charts in 2006. The project accounted for only one other single with "In Terms of Love". Unlike their previous efforts, John Shanks produced Fortuneteller's Melody. Kristyn selected him as producer as she had been writing songs with him for several years prior. She also described his production style as more "rootsy" than Huff's. The sisters noted that while their previous albums usually put more focus on planning the songs' arrangements, they felt their relationship with Shanks was more "improvisational". Kristyn stated that several of the songs she wrote with Shanks were recorded immediately after the two finished writing, and as a result, the other two sisters often did not know which song they would be recording on any given day. Additionally, Kristyn described the album as "honest" and thought that all of its songs had a common theme of the "drama" experienced by a musician attempting to balance their career and personal life. Besides Shanks, another collaborative writer on the album was Sheryl Crow, who contributed to two songs. "God Bless the American Housewife" was also included on United States pressings of Fortuneteller's Melody, and "God Bless the Canadian Housewife" on Canadian releases. Writing for the Times & Transcript, Eric Lewis gave the album four out of five stars. His review praised the album's variety of up-tempo songs and ballads, and thought the lyrics of songs such as "Burn Down the House" would appeal to women listeners.

Kelsi announced in February 2006 that she had become pregnant, requiring her to take maternity leave from the group's concert tours by mid-year. As a result, their youngest sister Karli filled in for her on a number of shows that year. At the time, Karli was attending Lipscomb University, and recalled that she had only one month to memorize the harmony vocals of 25 songs. Karli also filled in for Kelsi in the music video for "In Terms of Love".

=== 2008–2010: The Best of SHeDAISY and breakup ===
Lyric Street released a compilation album, The Best of SHeDAISY, in 2008. Country Universe writer Kevin John Coyne rated the album four out of five stars, as he thought it showcased the group's variety of sounds and strengths as performers, but also thought it would have been further improved by the inclusion of album cuts. This release was followed in March 2009 by a single titled "Bucket Full of Beautiful". In April 2010, Disney announced that it would be closing the Lyric Street label as a means of consolidating operations. At the time of closure, SHeDAISY was still one of several acts signed. Longview News-Journal reporter Jo Lee Ferguson stated in November 2010 that the group had not had any concerts listed on their website since June of that year, and that that an e-mail to their manager had not been answered. Additionally, Ferguson stated that the trio had recorded another album for Lyric Street titled A Story to Tell, which she determined not to have been released.

Courtney Campbell of Wide Open Country observed in 2020 that SHeDAISY quietly retired from performing after the closure of Lyric Street and largely returned to their personal lives. Despite the breakup, Kristyn Osborn and Arden composed a jingle in 2013 for the Calgary Zoo in Calgary, Alberta. This jingle was used to advertise a charity concert held at the zoo after it suffered damage in the 2013 Alberta floods.

== Musical styles ==
SHeDAISY's music is defined by the three sisters' vocal harmonies, as well as unconventional production and Kristyn's lyrics. Stephen L. Betts of Country Standard Time said that the group's sound had "rich, intricate harmony, coupled with passionate, empowering lyrical content" which he compared to a mix of Wilson Phillips and Martina McBride. Jim Patterson of the Associated Press described "girl-power lyrics, complex and busy arrangements with lots of studio sound effects, and non-stop vocal harmonies". Also writing for Country Standard Time, Rick Teverbaugh noted that the harmonies on the first two albums featured use of counterpoint, a technique he found mostly absent from Sweet Right Here. Kristyn stated that the three sisters learned to sing harmony on summertime road trips as children, where they would often sing along to albums by the Beach Boys and the Beatles with their parents. Among the sisters, Kassidy was the lead vocalist. In a review of Sweet Right Here, Loftus made note of unconventional lyrics, such as a name-drop of Appalachian folk dancer Jesco White in the track "Good Together (Bucket and Chicken)", or singing "blah blah blah" in the pre-chorus of "Don't Worry 'bout a Thing". Jeff Lincoln, also of Country Standard Time, thought songs such as "Get Over Yourself" had feminist themes, but thought the trio's sound was negatively impacted by loud production and "bouncy, chipper melodies regardless of lyrical topic".

SHeDAISY was frequently compared to the Dixie Chicks (now known as the Chicks), since both female trios' mainstream success began around the same time. Doug Robinson of Deseret News contrasted the two groups by noting that unlike the Chicks, the members of SHeDAISY were solely vocalists and not instrumentalists. He also noted that while all of SHeDAISY's songs were co-written by Kristyn, the Chicks recorded material by writers other than themselves. In the same article, music journalist Brian Mansfield thought the comparisons between SHeDAISY and the Chicks were furthered because no prior commercially successful country music acts had consisted of three women. Patterson also observed that a number of industry executives in Nashville regularly criticized SHeDAISY for their heavy pop influence. Salt Lake Tribune writer Lori Buttars thought that comparisons to the Chicks were furthered by "Friends-inspired hairdos and retro '70s style". The group was also compared to a number of contemporary solo female acts in country music. A.J. Flick of the Tucson Citizen compared SHeDAISY's image to that of Shania Twain, noting that both acts had names of Native American origin and both recorded "quasi-woman-empowering lyrics in poppy tunes that sometimes feature a misplaced fiddle". Leaver also contrasted SHeDAISY with Twain and Faith Hill due to a number of pop music influences, but thought that SHeDAISY's music would "challenge the listener" due to their heavier production style.

== Personal lives ==
Kassidy, Kelsi, and Kristyn have a younger sister named Karli, as well as brothers named Clayton and Cade. At the beginning of the 2010s, the latter three were all college basketball players: the former two at Lipscomb University and the latter at Mesa State College (now Colorado Mesa University). Cade also helped his father run a sewing business in West Valley City. During SHeDAISY's recording career, the Osborn family were members of the Church of Jesus Christ of Latter-day Saints.

Kassidy dated Rascal Flatts member Joe Don Rooney from 2001 to 2003, and married Derek Williamson on May 28, 2009. Kristyn was married to Joel Stevenett for four years until their divorce in 2002. According to her, this led to a fan theory that "angrier" songs on Knock on the Sky were written about the divorce; she stated that while the divorce did influence the album's writing, she and Stevenett divorced amicably. Kristyn had a relationship with actor Aaron Eckhart during 2006 and 2007, and he appeared in the music video for "I'm Taking the Wheel".

== Discography ==
Studio albums

- 1999: The Whole SHeBANG
- 2000: Brand New Year
- 2002: Knock on the Sky
- 2004: Sweet Right Here
- 2006: Fortuneteller's Melody
