= Jonathan Yudkin =

American multi-instrumentalist (born 1960)

- Born: 1960 (age 65–66); Philadelphia, Pennsylvania
- Genres: Rock, country
- Occupation: Musician
- Instruments: Banjo, cello, Celtic harp, guitar, mandocello, mandola, mandolin, double bass, viola, violin
- Years active: 1988–present
- Website: jonathanyudkin.com

Jonathan Yudkin is an American multi-instrumentalist who is a proficient player of banjo, violin, mandolin, and other stringed instruments. He is a session musician in Nashville as well as a record producer, arranger, and band leader.

== Biography ==
Growing up in Philadelphia, Yudkin's father led a synagogue choir and his mother was the featured soloist. Yudkin studied violin privately for many years, but inspired by the example of David Bromberg, he was drawn to playing country music. Yudkin joined the band RD1, the house band at the Lone Star Cafe in New York City. In the early 1980s, he moved to Nashville and joined Leon Russell's Paradise Band.

Yudkin has worked with Kathy Mattea, John Hartford, Rascal Flatts, Lonestar, Taylor Swift, Robert Earl Keen, Terri Clark, Shania Twain, Ty Herndon, Riders in the Sky, Kenny Rogers, Walter Hyatt, and others. Yudkin co-produced Ty Herndon's 2007 album Right About Now.

Yudkin has composed feature-length film soundtracks, including Born Wild (2013) and Dug Up (2014). He was a member of the Doug Dillard Band, along with Ginger Boatwright, Roger Rasnake, and David Grier. They recorded the albums What's That (1986) and Heartbreak Hotel (1989).

== Discography ==
=== With Robert Earl Keen ===
- 1988: The Live Album (Sugar Hill)
- 1989: West Textures (Sugar Hill)
- 1993: A Bigger Piece of Sky (Sugar Hill)
- 1994: Gringo Honeymoon (Sugar Hill)

=== As producer ===
- 1994: Tim Malchak – Home Town (Full House)
- 1996: Tim Malchak – The Coast is Clear (River Road)
- 1998: Marge Calhoun – Freedom on Captivity (Wizewoman)
- 2004: Wayne Warner – Doing Something Right (B-Venturous)
- 2007: Ty Herndon – Right About Now (Pyramid)

=== Also appears on ===
==== 1980s–1990s ====
- 1986: Ed Bruce – Night Things (RCA Victor)
- 1986: John Hartford – Annual Waltz (Dot)
- 1989: John Hartford – Down on the River (Flying Fish)
- 1989: Karen Staley – Wildest Dreams (MCA)
- 1990: Shelby Lynne – Tough All Over (Epic)
- 1990: Tammy Wynette – Heart Over Mind (Epic)
- 1991: Kathy Mattea – Time Passes By (Mercury / Polygram)
- 1991: Ronna Reeves – Only the Heart (Mercury / Polygram)
- 1992: Chris LeDoux – Whatcha Gonna Do with a Cowboy (Liberty)
- 1992: Kathy Mattea – Lonesome Standard Time (Mercury)
- 1993: Doug Dillard Band – Heartbreak Hotel (Flying Fish)
- 1993: Walter Hyatt – Music Town (Sugar Hill)
- 1993: Kathy Mattea – Good News (Mercury)
- 1993: Kathy Mattea – Walking Away a Winner (Mercury)
- 1993: Ronna Reeves – What Comes Naturally (Mercury)
- 1995: Guy Clark – Dublin Blues (Asylum / Elektra)
- 1995: Jars of Clay – Jars of Clay (Silvertone)
- 1996: Suzy Bogguss – Give Me Some Wheels (Liberty)
- 1996: Paul Brandt – Calm Before the Storm (Reprise)
- 1996: Billy Dean – It's What I Do (Capitol Nashville)
- 1997: Trace Adkins – Big Time (Capitol Nashville)
- 1997: Beth Nielsen Chapman – Sand and Water (Reprise)
- 1997: Tom Dundee – Tom Dundee (Flyte)
- 1997: Kathy Mattea – Love Travels (Mercury)
- 1999: Trace Adkins – More... (Capitol Nashville)
- 1999: Lonestar – Lonely Grill (BNA)
- 1999: Kenny Rogers – She Rides Wild Horses (Dreamcatcher)
- 1999: SHeDAISY – The Whole SHeBANG (Lyric Street)

==== 2000s ====
- 2000: Sara Evans – Born to Fly (RCA)
- 2000: Lonestar- This Christmas Time (BNA)
- 2000: Rascal Flatts – Rascal Flatts (Lyric Street)
- 2000: Riders in the Sky – Woody's Roundup: A Rootin' Tootin' Collection of Woody's Favorite Songs (Walt Disney)
- 2000: Kenny Rogers – There You Go Again (Dreamcatcher)
- 2000: SHeDAISY – Brand New Year (Lyric Street)
- 2001: Chris Cagle – Play it Loud (Capitol)
- 2001: Jewel – This Way (Atlantic)
- 2001: Lonestar – I'm Already There (BNA)
- 2001: Michael Martin Murphey – Playing Favorites (Real West)
- 2002: Kate Campbell – Monuments (Evangeline)
- 2002: Faith Hill – Cry (Warner Bros.)
- 2002: Little Big Town – Little Big Town (Monument)
- 2002: Michael Martin Murphey – Cowboy Classics: Playing Favorites II (Real West)
- 2002: Beth Nielsen Chapman – Deeper Still (Artemis)
- 2002: Rascal Flatts – Melt (Lyric Street)
- 2002: SHeDAISY – Knock on the Sky (Lyric Street)
- 2002: Shania Twain – Up! (Mercury)
- 2003: Trace Adkins – Comin' On Strong (Capitol Nashville)
- 2003: Billy Ray Cyrus – The Other Side (Word)
- 2003: Wynonna Judd – What the World Needs Now is Love (Curb)
- 2003: Cerys Matthews – Cockahoop (Blanco Y Negro)
- 2003: Martina McBride – Martina (RCA)
- 2003: Kenny Rogers – Back to the Well (Sanctuary)
- 2003: Blake Shelton – The Dreamer (Warner Bros. Nashville)
- 2003: Jessica Simpson – In This Skin (Columbia)
- 2004: Big & Rich – Horse of a Different Color (Warner Bros.)
- 2004: Josh Gracin – Josh Gracin (Lyric Street)
- 2004: Carolyn Dawn Johnson – Dress Rehearsal (Arista Nashville)
- 2004: Lonestar – Let's Be Us Again (BNA)
- 2004: Megadeth – The System Has Failed (Sanctuary)
- 2004: Gretchen Peters – Halcyon (Curb)
- 2004: SHeDAISY – Sweet Right Here (Lyric Street)
- 2004: Keith Urban – Be Here (Capitol Nashville)
- 2005: Trace Adkins – Songs About Me (Capitol Nashville)
- 2005: Big & Rich – Comin' to Your City (Warner Bros. Nashville)
- 2005: Chris Cagle – Anywhere but Here (Capitol Nashville)
- 2005: Kim Carnes – Chasin' Wild Trains (Corazong)
- 2005: Little Big Town – The Road to Here (Equity Music Group)
- 2005: Lonestar – Coming Home (BNA)
- 2005: Martina McBride – Timeless (RCA)
- 2005: LeAnn Rimes – This Woman (Curb)
- 2005: Carrie Underwood – Some Hearts (Arista Nashville)
- 2005: Gretchen Wilson – All Jacked Up (Sony BMG)
- 2005: Chely Wright – The Metropolitan Hotel (Painted Red / Dualtone)
- 2006: Trace Adkins – Dangerous Man (Capitol Nashville)
- 2006: Steve Holy – Brand New Girlfriend (Curb)
- 2006: Toby Keith – White Trash with Money (Show Dog Nashville)
- 2006: Lonestar – Mountains (BNA)
- 2006: Martina McBride – Waking Up Laughing (RCA)
- 2006: Cindy Morgan – Postcards (Reunion)
- 2006: Rascal Flatts – Me and My Gang (Lyric Street)
- 2006: Kenny Rogers – Water & Bridges (EMI / Capitol)
- 2006: SHeDAISY – Fortuneteller's Melody (Lyric Street)
- 2006: Keith Urban – Love, Pain & the Whole Crazy Thing (Capitol Nashville)
- 2007: Big & Rich – Between Raising Hell and Amazing Grace (Warner Bros. Nashville)
- 2007: Halfway to Hazard – Halfway to Hazard (StyleSonic)
- 2007: Toby Keith – Big Dog Daddy (Show Dog Nashville)
- 2007: Toby Keith – A Classic Christmas (Show Dog Nashville)
- 2007: Lonestar – My Christmas List (Cracker Barrel)
- 2007: LeAnn Rimes – Family (Curb)
- 2007: Carrie Underwood – Carnival Ride (Arista Nashville)
- 2007: Gretchen Wilson – One of the Boys (Sony BMG Nashville)
- 2007: Trisha Yearwood – Heaven, Heartache and the Power of Love (Big Machine)
- 2008: Richard Bennett – Code Red Cloud Nine (Moderne Shellac)
- 2008: Chris Cagle – My Life's Been a Country Song (Capitol Nashville)
- 2008: Julianne Hough – Julianne Hough (Mercury)
- 2008: Jewel – Perfectly Clear (Valory Music)
- 2008: Jessica Simpson – Do You Know (Sony BMG)
- 2008: Taylor Swift – Fearless (Big Machine)
- 2009: Jann Arden – Free (Universal)
- 2009: Rodney Atkins – It's America (Curb)
- 2009: Eric Church – Carolina (Capitol Nashville)
- 2009: Terri Clark – The Long Way Home (Capitol Nashville)
- 2009: Kelly Clarkson – All I Ever Wanted (RCA)
- 2009: Jessie James – Jessie James (Mercury)
- 2009: Jewel – Lullaby (Fisher-Price)
- 2009: Martina McBride – Shine (RCA / Sony)
- 2009: Ruben Studdard – Love Is (Hickory)
- 2009: Carrie Underwood – Play On (Arista Nashville)

==== 2010s ====
- 2010: Angela Aki – Life (Epic)
- 2010: Jewel – Sweet and Wild (Valory Music)
- 2010: Reba McEntire – All the Women I Am (Starstruck / Valory)
- 2010: Steven Tyler – Love Lives (Sony)
- 2010: Chely Wright – Lifted Off the Ground (Vanguard)
- 2011: Matraca Berg – The Dreaming Fields (Dualtone)
- 2011: Lady Antebellum – Own the Night (Capitol Nashville)
- 2011: Scotty McCreery – Clear as Day (Mercury Nashville)
- 2012: Big & Rich – Hillbilly Jedi (Warner Bros. Nashville)
- 2012: Kix Brooks – New to This Town (Arista Nashville)
- 2012: Lady Antebellum – On This Winter's Night (Capitol Nashville)
- 2012: Jennette McCurdy – Jennette McCurdy (Capitol Nashville)
- 2012: Taylor Swift – Red (Big Machine)
- 2012: Carrie Underwood – Blown Away (Arista Nashville)
- 2013: Cher – Closer to the Truth (Warner Bros.)
- 2013: Lonestar – Life as We Know It (4 Star)
- 2013: Cassadee Pope – Frame by Frame (Republic Nashville)
- 2013: The Wanted – Word of Mouth (Mercury)
- 2014: Dierks Bentley – Riser (Capitol Nashville)
- 2014: Lucy Hale – Road Between (DMG Nashville)
- 2015: James Bay – Chaos and the Calm (Republic)
- 2015: Natalie Imbruglia – Male (Portrait)
- 2015: Maddie & Tae – Start Here (Republic)
- 2015: Reba McEntire – Love Somebody (Nash Icon)
- 2016: Jason Aldean – They Don't Know (Sony)
- 2016: Dierks Bentley – Black (Capitol / Decca)
- 2016: Martina McBride – Reckless (Nash Icon)
- 2016: Pink – The Truth About Love (RCA)
- 2016: Keith Urban – Ripcord (Capitol Nashville)
- 2016: Foy Vance – The Wild Swan (Elektra)
- 2017: Big & Rich – Did It for the Party (Thirty Tigers)
- 2017: Brantley Gilbert – The Devil Don't Sleep (Valory)
- 2017: Malcolm Holcombe – Pretty Little Troubles (Gypsy Eyes)
