= Don't Worry 'bout a Thing (SHeDAISY song) =

Single by SHeDAISY

from the album Sweet Right Here
- Released: January 24, 2005
- Genre: Country
- Length: 3:36
- Label: Lyric Street
- Songwriters: Kristyn Osborn; Jason Deere
- Producers: Dann Huff; SHeDAISY

SHeDAISY singles chronology
"Come Home Soon" (2004)	"Don't Worry 'bout a Thing" (2005)	"I'm Taking the Wheel" (2005)

Music video
- "Don't Worry 'bout a Thing" at CMT.com

"Don't Worry 'bout a Thing" is a song recorded by American country music trio SHeDAISY. The song was written by member Kristyn Osborn and songwriter Jason Deere, and was produced by SHeDAISY and Dann Huff. The song was released on January 24, 2005, through Lyric Street Records as the third and final single from their fourth studio album Sweet Right Here (2004).

Receiving positive reviews, "Don't Worry 'bout a Thing" became SHeDAISY's fourth and final top ten hit on the Hot Country Songs chart, peaking at number seven.

== Content ==
The song asks the listener if they have ever experienced any of a series of unfortunate events, some general (“Ever lost your luggage, your marbles your house?”) and some specific to those in the music industry (“Ever been accused of murder on Music Row?”), in the verses; the chorus goes on to explain that such predicaments are a part of life and not to worry about them.

== Critical reception ==
Allmusic critic Johnny Loftus described the song as being one of the standout tracks on Sweet Right Here. In his review, he said that the three members of SHeDAISY "take the song's message to heart, loosening up and having a good time… 'blah blah blah'-ing their way through the pre-chorus".

== Music video ==
The song's music video, directed by Trey Fanjoy, alternates between performance footage and shots of SHeDAISY in a convertible. Computer-generated animation of the song's lyrics also appears on screen.

== Chart performance ==
"Don't Worry 'bout a Thing" debuted on the Billboard Hot Country Songs the week of February 5, 2005, at number 56. The song rose to number 47 the next week. "Don't Worry 'bout a Thing" entered the top forty on March 12, 2005 at number 36. The song slowly rose to the top ten the week of July 30, 2005, at number ten, giving the group their first top ten since their near-number one hit "I Will… But" peaked at number two in 2000. The song rose up to number nine the next week. On August 13, 2005, "Don't Worry 'bout a Thing" reached its peak position of number seven, spending one week in its position. The song would go on to spend thirty weeks on the chart.

== Charts ==
Chart (2005)	Peak position
US Hot Country Songs (Billboard)	7
US Billboard Hot 100	59
US Billboard Pop 100	80

=== Year-end charts ===
Chart (2005)	Position
US Country Songs (Billboard)	39
