= You're in My Head =

Single by Brian McComas

from the album Brian McComas
- Released: October 4, 2003
- Genre: Country
- Length: 3:36
- Label: Lyric Street
- Songwriter(s): Jeffrey Steele, Shane Minor, Chris Wallin
- Producer(s): Leigh Reynolds

Brian McComas singles chronology
"99.9% Sure (I've Never Been Here Before)" (2003)	"You're in My Head" (2003)	"The Middle of Nowhere" (2004)

"You're in My Head" is a song recorded by American country music artist Brian McComas. It was released in October 2003 as the second single from the album Brian McComas. The song reached #21 on the Billboard Hot Country Singles & Tracks chart. The song was written by Jeffrey Steele, Shane Minor and Chris Wallin.

== Chart performance ==
Chart (2003–2004)	Peak position
US Bubbling Under Hot 100 (Billboard)	18
US Hot Country Songs (Billboard)	21
