= Brand New Year =

Studio album by SHeDAISY
- Released: September 26, 2000
- Recorded: 1999–2000
- Studio: Emerald Entertainment and Space & Time Studios (Nashville, Tennessee); The Bennett House and Sound Kitchen (Franklin, Tennessee)
- Genre: Country
- Length: 54:38
- Label: Lyric Street
- Producer: Dann Huff

SHeDAISY chronology
The Whole SHeBANG (1999)	Brand New Year (2000)	The Whole SHeBANG: All Mixed Up (2001)

Professional ratings
Review scores
Source	Rating
AllMusic	4/5 stars

Brand New Year is the second studio album and the first Christmas album from country music trio SHeDAISY; it was released September 26, 2000. The renditions of "Deck the Halls" and "Jingle Bells" both charted on the Billboard country charts in 2000, peaking at No. 37 and No. 44, respectively. It's best known for "Deck the Halls" appearing on Disney's 1999 Christmas film Mickey's Once Upon a Christmas.

== Track listing ==
1. "Deck the Halls" (traditional) – 3:50
2. "Santa's Got a Brand New Bag" (Kristyn Osborn, Jason Deere) – 3:08
3. "That's What I Want for Christmas" (Earl E. Lawrence) – 3:18
4. "Jingle Bells" (J.S. Pierpoint) – 3:57
5. "A Really, Really Merry Scary Intro" – 0:21
6. "Tinseltown" (Tim Nichols, Connie Harrington, Osborn) – 3:54
7. "Sleigh Ride" (Leroy Anderson, Mitchell Parish) – 3:15
8. "What Child Is This?" (traditional) – 4:20
9. "Hark! The Herald Angels Sing/Carol of the Bells" (Felix Mendelssohn, Charles Wesley, traditional) – 4:07
  - featuring tobymac
10. "The Secret of Christmas" (Sammy Cahn, Jimmy Van Heusen) – 4:08
11. "Christmas Children" (Leslie Bricusse) – 3:50
12. "Twist of the Magi" (Marcus Hummon, Osborn) – 4:27
  - featuring Rascal Flatts
13. "Brand New Year (My Revolution)" (Richard Marx, Osborn) – 4:20 (9:27 overall)
  - [Silence] – 3:00
  - "How Can I Keep from Singing?" – 2:07
14. [Silence] hidden track – 0:04

== Personnel ==
SHeDAISY

- Kassidy Osborn – backing vocals
- Kelsi Osborn – lead vocals
- Kristyn Osborn – backing vocals

Musicians

- Tim Akers – keyboards
- Dann Huff – acoustic guitar, electric guitar
- B. James Lowry – acoustic guitar (1)
- Gordon Kennedy – electric guitar, acoustic guitar (4)
- Jerry McPherson – electric guitar, bouzouki (4), acoustic guitar (8, 11)
- Paul Franklin – steel guitar (1)
- Jonathan Yudkin – mandolin (4), fiddle (4)
- Glenn Worf – bass
- Steve Brewster – drums (1, 3–9, 11–13)
- Joel Stevenett – drums (2, 10)
- Eric Darken – percussion
- Aubrey Haynie – fiddle (1)
- Mark Douthit – saxophone (2)
- George Tidwell – trumpet (3)
- Bobby G. Taylor – oboe (8)
- TobyMac – guest vocals (9)
- Rascal Flatts – guest vocals (12)

The Nashville String Machine (Tracks 3, 9 & 11)

- Ronn Huff – string arrangements and conductor
- John Catchings – cello
- Anthony LaMarchina – cello
- Bob Mason – cello
- Jack Jezioro – double bass
- Jim Grosjean – viola
- Gary Vanosdale – viola
- Kristin Wilkinson – viola
- David Angell – violin
- David Davidson – violin
- Conni Ellisor – violin
- Carl Gorodetzky – violin, string contractor
- Lee Larrison – violin
- Pamela Sixfin – violin
- Alan Umstead – violin
- Catherine Umstead – violin
- Mary Kathryn Vanosdale – violin

=== Production ===
- Doug Howard – A&R
- Shelby Kennedy – A&R
- Dann Huff – producer
- Jeff Balding – recording, mixing
- Mark Hagen – additional recording, recording assistant, mix assistant
- Dave Beller – recording assistant (2–13), mix assistant (2–13)
- Eric Bickel – recording assistant (2–13), mix assistant (2–13)
- Drew Bollman – recording assistant (2–13), mix assistant (2–13)
- Jed Hackett – recording assistant (2–13), mix assistant (2–13)
- Scott Kidd – recording assistant (2–13), mix assistant (2–13)
- Shaun Simpson – digital editing (1)
- Doug Sax – mastering
- Robert Hadley – co-mastering (2–13)
- The Mastering Lab (Hollywood, California) – mastering location
- Mike "Frog" Griffith – production coordinator
- Ross Pelton – photography
- Gina Binkley – design
- Sherri Halford – art direction
- Greg McCarn – art direction
- Daniel Caudill – wardrobe
- Robert Ramos – hair
- Miriam Vulich – make-up
- Cindy Wunsch – management

== Charts ==
=== Weekly charts ===
Chart (2000)	Peak position
US Billboard 200	92
US Top Country Albums (Billboard)	10
US Top Holiday Albums (Billboard)	11

=== Year-end charts ===
Chart (2001)	Position
US Top Country Albums (Billboard)	48
