= The Whole SHeBANG =

1999 album by SHeDAISY

Studio album by SHeDAISY
- Released: May 11, 1999
- Studios: The Bennett House (Franklin, Tennessee); Masterfonics and Quad Studios (Nashville, Tennessee)
- Genre: Country
- Length: 43:04
- Label: Lyric Street
- Producer: Dann Huff

SHeDAISY chronology
The Whole SHeBANG (1999)	Brand New Year (2000)

Singles from The Whole SHeBANG
- 1. "Little Good-Byes" Released: February 1999; 2. "This Woman Needs" Released: August 30, 1999; 3. "I Will… But" Released: April 14, 2000; 4. "Lucky 4 You (Tonight I'm Just Me)" Released: September 18, 2000; 5. "Still Holding Out for You" Released: April 21, 2001

The Whole SHeBANG is the first studio album by the American country music group SHeDAISY. It was released on May 11, 1999, on Lyric Street Records, and has been certified Platinum by the Recording Industry Association of America. Singles from this album were "Little Good-Byes," "This Woman Needs," "I Will… But," "Lucky 4 You (Tonight I'm Just Me)" and "Still Holding Out for You."

== Critical reception ==
Stephen Thomas Erlewine of AllMusic said that he did not consider the album country in sound, but still thought that the songs were well-executed, praising Kristyn Osborn's songwriting skills and the trio's vocal harmonies. Billboard gave the album a positive review, saying: "The group features intricate, shifting harmonies, proving once again that sibling harmony singing is unmatched." The magazine also praised Kristyn Osborn's writing.

== Commercial performance ==
The Whole SHeBANG debuted on the US Billboard Top Country Albums chart at number 14 and also debuted atop Heatseekers Albums, with approximately 11,000 units sold. Throughout 1999, the album remained in the Top Country Albums chart, and it was certified Gold by the RIAA on November 1, 1999.

== Track listing ==
All tracks are written by Kristyn Osborn; co-writers as indicated.

No.	Title	Writer(s)	Length
1.	"Little Good-Byes"	Kenny Greenberg, Jason Deere	3:20
2.	"I Will... But"	Deere	3:40
3.	"This Woman Needs"	Connie Harrington, Bonnie Baker	3:20
4.	"Before Me and You"	Baker, Deere	3:09
5.	"Lucky 4 You (Tonight I'm Just Me)"	Coley McCabe, Deere	4:00
6.	"Still Holding Out for You"	Richard Marx	4:21
7.	"Punishment"	Carolyn Dawn Johnson	3:56
8.	"'Cause I Like It That Way"	Hollie Poole	3:44
9.	"Without Your Love"	Stephony Smith, Cathy Majeski	3:56
10.	"A Night to Remember"	Bob Farrell, Deere	4:41
11.	"Dancing with Angels"	Austin Cunningham	4:57

== Personnel ==
As listed in liner notes.

SHeDAISY

- Kassidy Osborn – lead vocals
- Kelsi Osborn – backing vocals
- Kristyn Osborn – backing vocals

Studio musicians

- John Hobbs – keyboards
- Tim Lauer – electric piano (1), accordion (2, 4), Hammond B3 organ (8), keyboards (8, 11)
- Steve Nathan – keyboards (3–7, 9, 10)
- Dann Huff – electric guitars
- Gordon Kennedy – electric guitars (1, 2, 4–6, 8–11)
- Biff Watson – acoustic guitars (1, 2, 4–6, 8–11)
- B. James Lowry – acoustic guitars (3, 7)
- Dan Dugmore – steel guitar (1, 2, 4, 8–11)
- Paul Franklin – steel guitar (3, 4, 6, 7)
- Jonathan Yudkin – mandolin (2, 4, 7, 10)
- Glenn Worf – bass (1–6, 8–11)
- Mike Brignardello – bass (7)
- Vinnie Colaiuta – drums (1, 2, 4–6, 8–11)
- Paul Leim – drums (3, 7)
- Terry McMillan – percussion (1, 5, 9, 10), harmonica (1)
- Eric Darken – percussion (2, 4, 6, 8, 9, 11)
- Aubrey Haynie – fiddle (1, 2, 4, 5, 9)

Production

- Doug Howard – A&R direction
- Shelby Kennedy – A&R direction
- Dann Huff – producer
- Jeff Balding – recording, mixing
- Mark Hagen – additional engineer, recording assistant, mix assistant
- Shawn McLean – recording assistant, mix assistant
- Patrick Murphy – recording assistant, mix assistant
- Greg Parker – recording assistant, mix assistant
- David Streit – recording assistant, mix assistant
- Giles Reaves – digital editing
- Doug Sax – mastering at The Mastering Lab (Hollywood, California)
- Mike "Frog" Griffith – production coordinator
- David Hogan – photography
- Sherri Halford – art direction
- Greg McCarn – art direction
- Altar Ego Design – design

== Charts ==
=== Weekly charts ===
Chart (1999–2000)	Peak position
Canadian Country Albums (RPM)	4
US Billboard 200	70
US Top Country Albums (Billboard)	6
US Heatseekers Albums (Billboard)	1

=== Year-end charts ===
Chart (1999)	Position
US Top Country Albums (Billboard)	21

Chart (2000)	Position
US Billboard 200	95
US Top Country Albums (Billboard)	11

Chart (2001)	Position
Canadian Country Albums (Nielsen SoundScan)	89

== Certifications ==
Region	Certification	Certified units/sales
United States (RIAA)	Platinum	1,000,000^{^}
^{^} Shipments figures based on certification alone.

== The Whole SHeBANG: All Mixed Up ==
The Whole SHeBANG: All Mixed Up

Remix album by SHeDAISY
- Released: September 25, 2001
- Genre: Country
- Label: Lyric Street
- Producer: Dann Huff

SHeDAISY chronology
Brand New Year (2000)	The Whole SHeBANG: All Mixed Up (2001)	Knock on the Sky (2002)

The Whole SHeBANG: All Mixed Up was released on September 25, 2001. The album contains radio remixes of the songs originally from The Whole SHeBANG. It received a two-star rating from Maria Konicki Dinoia of AllMusic, who thought the album was too similar to the original, remarking: "simply stated, it's the first album, this time with an overproduced sound. Listeners may hear heavier guitars, digitized sound breaks, some funky echoes, and the occasional a cappella break out. Unless you're a hardcore SheDAISY fan, there really isn't anything excitingly new here or that you haven't heard already."

=== Track listing (All Mixed Up) ===
1. "Little Good-Byes" - 3:51
2. "I Will... But" - 4:28
3. "This Woman Needs" - 3:18
4. "Before Me and You" - 3:37
5. "Lucky 4 You (Tonight I'm Just Me)" - 5:36
6. "Still Holding Out for You" - 4:21
7. "Punishment" - 4:27
8. "'Cause I Like It That Way" - 5:01
9. "Without Your Love" - 5:30
10. "A Night to Remember" - 5:06
11. "Dancing with Angels" - 6:21

=== Chart performance (All Mixed Up) ===
Chart (2001)	Peak position
US Top Country Albums (Billboard)	30
