= Mine All Mine (disambiguation) =

Mine All Mine is a British television series produced for ITV.

Mine All Mine may also refer to:

- "Mine All Mine" (Van Halen song), a single from Van Halen's 1988 album OU812
- "Mine All Mine" (Tara Lyn Hart song), recorded by SHeDAISY's in 2002
