= Get Over Yourself =

Get Over Yourself may refer to:

- "Get Over Yourself" (Eden's Crush song)
- "Get Over Yourself" (SHeDAISY song)
