= 99.9% Sure (I've Never Been Here Before) =

Single by Brian McComas

from the album Brian McComas
- Released: March 10, 2003
- Genre: Country pop
- Length: 3:13
- Label: Lyric Street
- Songwriters: Billy Austin; Greg Barnhill
- Producer: Leigh Reynolds

Brian McComas singles chronology
"I Could Never Love You Enough" (2002)	"99.9% Sure (I've Never Been Here Before)" (2003)	"You're in My Head" (2003)

"99.9% Sure (I've Never Been Here Before)" is a song by American country music recording musician Brian McComas. It was written by Billy Austin and Greg Barnhill and produced by Leigh Reynolds, and was included on his self-titled debut studio album (2003). It was released on March 10, 2003, via Lyric Street Records, as the third single from the album yet was the first single from the album in over a year.

The track proved to become McComas' biggest hit, hitting number ten on the US Billboard Hot Country Songs chart and number eight on the Radio & Records Country Top 50, becoming his only top ten single on both of the charts. It was also his only entry on both the Billboard Hot 100 and Hot 100 Airplay charts, peaking at numbers 57 and 54. McComas performed the song as part of his setlist as an opener on Rascal Flatts' CMT Most Wanted Live tour.

== Background ==
The track was one of hundreds McComas listened to before choosing the five final songs for his debut album. He said, "I let my wife hear it, and we were both humming it and singing it to each other. I thought, ‘If I’ve heard 1,200 songs and I'm humming and singing this one, then I might think about cutting it.'"

== Composition ==
"99.9% Sure (I've Never Been Here Before)" is written in the key of G major, with his vocals ranging from D_{4}–C_{6}. The track moves at a tempo of 116 beats per minute. The track lyrically describes McComas singing about a good relationship and how he's "99.9% sure" he's never had a good love like this.

== Critical reception ==
Brian Mansfield of USA Today stated that the song's "clean steel lines and bright guitars [blend] agreeably on contemporary country radio." Kristina Dorsey of The Day magazine commented that the song was "idiosyncratic and catchy in the best mandolin–pop way."

== Chart performance ==
"99.9% Sure (I've Never Been Here Before)" debuted on the US Billboard Hot Country Songs chart, then known as Hot Country Singles & Tracks, the week of March 8, 2003, at number 59. It peaked at number ten on the chart for the week of August 2, 2003, becoming his only top ten single. It spent 27 weeks in total on the chart. In September 2005, the track received a Spin Award from Broadcast Data Systems for 100,000 confirmed airplay spins.

== Music video ==
Brent Hedgecock directed the music video. McComas told CMT about the experience, "Brent [Hedgecock] said, 'We're going to change around the scenery as much as we can." The video was filmed all over the state of California in 20 different locations, averaging about four to five locations per day; it was filmed across four days.

== Personnel ==
Taken from the Brian McComas album booklet.

- Lonnie Wilson – drums
- Glenn Worf – bass
- David Grissom – electric guitar
- Biff Watson – acoustic guitar
- Steve Nathan – keyboards
- Dan Dugmore – steel guitar
- Aubrey Haynie – fiddle
- Eric Darken – percussion
- Leigh Reynolds – banjo

== Charts ==
=== Weekly charts ===
Weekly chart performance for "99.9% Sure (I've Never Been Here Before)"
Chart (2003)	Peak position
US Billboard Hot 100	57
US Hot Country Songs (Billboard)	10
US Radio Songs (Billboard)	54
US Country Top 50 (Radio & Records)	8

=== Year-end charts ===
Year-end chart performance for "99.9% Sure (I've Never Been Here Before)"
Chart (2003)	Position
US Country Songs (Billboard)	40
US Country (Radio & Records)	40
