= Passenger Seat =

Passenger Seat may refer to:

- A place for a passenger to sit
- "Passenger Seat\", a song by Stephen Speaks
- "Passenger Seat", a song by Chamillionaire
- "Passenger Seat" (Vincent song), the first song on SHeDAISY's Sweet Right Here album
