= Brian McComas (album) =

Studio album by Brian McComas
- Released: July 22, 2003
- Studio: Omni Sound; Vital Recordings; Emerald — Studio 6 Ocean Way Studios; Sound Mountain (Nashville, TN)
- Genre: Country
- Length: 42:45
- Label: Lyric Street
- Producer: Leigh Reynolds; Leon Medica

Brian McComas chronology
Brian McComas (2003)	Back Up Again (2005)

Singles from Brian McComas
- 1. "Night Disappear With You" Released: August 13, 2001; 2. "I Could Never Love You Enough" Released: January 28, 2002; 3. "99.9% Sure (I've Never Been Here Before)" Released: March 10, 2003; 4. "You're in My Head" Released: September 8, 2003

Brian McComas is the debut studio album by American country music artist Brian McComas. It was released on July 22, 2003 via Lyric Street Records.

== Singles ==
Four singles in total spawned from the record. Between 2001 and 2002, the album's first two singles, "Night Disappear with You" and its b-side, "I Could Never Love You Enough", were released. Both peaked outside the top forty, peaking at numbers 41 and 46 on the US Billboard Hot Country Songs chart. Over a year later in 2003, McComas would release the biggest chart success of his career in the form of "99.9% Sure (I've Never Been Here Before)"; the track peaked at number 10 on the Billboard chart and number eight on the Radio & Records country airplay chart. The fourth and final single, "You're in My Head", became a top forty hit, hitting number 21 on the Billboard Hot Country Songs.

McComas later released a fifth single for Lyric Street Records, "The Middle of Nowhere", sent to country radio on February 21, 2005. The track, written by McComas and produced by Leigh Reynolds, was expected to be part of his second studio album, planned for an early summer 2005 release date. The track stalled at number 43 and McComas would later leave Lyric Street altogether in late 2005.

== Critical reception ==
Jeffrey B. Remz of Country Standard Time gave the album a mostly-negative review. He praised McComas's vocal performances on the up-tempo songs such as "You're in My Head," but thought that most of the songs were "pleasant enough, but no more." Brian Mansfield gave the album two-and-a-half stars out of four in a review for USA Today, referring to McComas as a "likeable fellow" and saying that the sound of "99.9% Sure" "blend[s] agreeably on contemporary country radio."

== Track listing ==
Brian McComas track listing
No.	Title	Writer(s)	Producer	Length
1.	"99.9% Sure (I've Never Been Here Before)"	Billy Austin; Greg Barnhill	Leigh Reynolds	3:13
2.	"Come with Me"	Mark D. Sanders; Branden Hart	Reynolds	3:37
3.	"Night Disappear with You"	Brian McComas	Leon Medica	3:37
4.	"You'd Have Never Said Goodbye"	Ken Harrell; Ray Scott; Shaye Smith	Medica	3:19
5.	"Sixteen Again"	Neal Coty; Phillip White; Jimmy Melton	Reynolds	3:18
6.	"You're in My Head"	Shane Minor; Jeffrey Steele; Chris Wallin	Reynolds	3:36
7.	"Baby Let Me Be Your Man"	McComas	Medica	4:46
8.	"Never Meant a Thing"	McComas	Medica	4:51
9.	"Straight to You"	Sanders; Tia Sillers	Medica	3:29
10.	"I Could Never Love You Enough"	McComas	Medica	4:14
11.	"I'll Always Be There for You"	Odie Blackmon; Steve Seskin	Reynolds	4:47
Total length:				42:45

== Personnel ==
As listed in liner notes.

- Tim Akers – keyboards
- Steve Brewster – drums, percussion
- Joel Carr – acoustic guitar, electric guitar
- Eric Darken – percussion
- Dan Dugmore – steel guitar, Dobro, slide guitar
- David Grissom – electric guitar
- Aubrey Haynie – fiddle, mandolin
- Brian McComas – vocals
- Jerry McPherson – electric guitar
- Leon Medica – bass guitar
- Gene Miller – background vocals
- Steve Nathan – keyboards
- Leigh Reynolds – acoustic guitar, banjo
- John Wesley Ryles – background vocals
- Russell Terrell – background vocals
- Biff Watson – acoustic guitar
- Lonnie Wilson – drums
- Glenn Worf – bass guitar

Strings on "I'll Always Be There for You" performed by the Nashville String Machine; arranged by Bergen White.

== Charts ==
Chart (2003)	Peak position
US Billboard 200	149
US Top Country Albums (Billboard)	21
US Heatseekers Albums (Billboard)	4
