= Little Good-Byes =

- CD single cover

Single by SHeDAISY

from the album The Whole SHeBANG
- B-side: "Still Holding Out for You"
- Released: February 22, 1999
- Recorded: 1998
- Genre: Country
- Length: 3:20
- Label: Lyric Street
- Songwriters: Kenny Greenberg; Kristyn Osborn; Jason Deere
- Producer: Dann Huff

SHeDAISY singles chronology
"Little Good-Byes" (1999)	"This Woman Needs" (1999)

"Little Good-Byes" is the debut single by American country music group SHeDAISY. The song was written by member Kristyn Osborn alongside Jason Deere and Kenny Greenberg and produced by Dann Huff. It was released on February 22, 1999 as the lead single from their debut studio album The Whole SHeBANG (1999). The song's b-side, "Still Holding Out for You" was later released in April 2001 as the final single from their album.

Receiving positive reception, "Little Good-Byes" became a success. It reached number three on the US Hot Country Songs and number seven on the Canadian RPM Country Tracks, alongside peaking at number 43 on the Billboard Hot 100.

== Content ==
SHeDAISY, formerly known as the Osborn Sisters, were performing various venues around Nashville, Tennessee, and working in department stores to support themselves financially. In 1994, before their signing with Lyric Street Records, Kristyn Osborn (one-third of the trio) had befriended songwriter Jason Deere, which led to them writing multiple songs together. Deere then recommended SHeDAISY's songs to various record label agents, and in 1997, the act performed the song in the office of Lyric Street's artists and repertoire agent Shelby Kennedy, leading to their signing with the label in 1998. Kristyn came up with the phrase "little good-byes" and thought it could be used to represent a number of objects left behind by one half of a couple in their house after a breakup.

== Critical reception ==
Billboard gave the song a positive review, noting that, "It's a solid debut that should serve notice to programmers that there's room for more than one female trio (referencing the Dixie Chicks) in the format."

== Music video ==
The video premiered to CMT on February 14, 1999.

== Charts ==
"Little Good-Byes" debuted on the US Hot Country Songs chart the week of February 27, 1999, at number 67.

=== Weekly charts ===
Chart (1999)	Peak position
Canada Country Singles (RPM)	7
US Billboard Hot 100	43
US Hot Country Songs (Billboard)	3
US Country Top 50 (Radio & Records)	4

=== Year-end charts ===
Chart (1999)	Position
Canada Country Tracks (RPM)	48
US All-Format (Billboard)	84
US Country Songs (Billboard)	16
US Country (Radio & Records)	20
