= Save Me (Tara Lyn Hart song) =

Single by Tara Lyn Hart

from the album Tara Lyn Hart
- Released: 2000
- Genre: Country
- Length: 2:54
- Label: Epic
- Songwriter(s): Tara Lyn Hart; Hal Draper; David Quilico
- Producer(s): Josh Leo

Tara Lyn Hart singles chronology
"Mine All Mine" (2000)	"Save Me" (2000)	"Don't Ever Let Me Go" (2000)

"Save Me" is a song recorded by Canadian country music artist Tara Lyn Hart. It was released in 2000 as the third single from her debut album, Tara Lyn Hart. It peaked at number 5 on the RPM Country Tracks chart in April 2000. In 2001 the song was named by SOCAN as one of the most performed Canadian country songs.

== Chart performance ==
Chart (2000)	Peak position
Canada Country Tracks (RPM)	5
