= Stuff That Matters =

Single by Tara Lyn Hart

from the album Tara Lyn Hart
- B-side: "You Again"
- Released: October 19, 1999
- Genre: Country
- Length: 3:28
- Label: Columbia
- Songwriter: David Martin
- Producer: Josh Leo

Tara Lyn Hart singles chronology
"Stuff That Matters" (1999)	"Mine All Mine" (2000)

"Stuff That Matters" is a song recorded by Canadian country music artist Tara Lyn Hart. It was released in October 1999 as the first single from her debut album, Tara Lyn Hart. It peaked at number 6 on the RPM Country Tracks chart in November 1999.

== Chart performance ==
Chart (1999)	Peak position
Canada Country Singles (RPM)	6
US Hot Country Songs (Billboard)	67

=== Year-end charts ===
Chart (1999)	Position
Canada Country Tracks (RPM)	59
