= Brian McComas =

American singer-songwriter

- Born: May 23, 1972 (age 53); Bethesda, Maryland, U.S.
- Origin: Harrison, Arkansas, U.S.
- Genres: Country
- Occupation: Singer-songwriter
- Instrument: Vocals
- Years active: 2000–present
- Labels: Mercury Nashville; Lyric Street; Katapult

Brian McComas (born May 23, 1972) is an American country music artist. Originally signed to Mercury Nashville Records, and then Lyric Street Records in 2001, McComas charted two minor singles in 2001 and 2002. A year later, he charted the Top Ten single "99.9% Sure (I've Never Been Here Before)" on the Billboard Hot Country Singles & Tracks charts. His eponymous debut album was also released that year. It produced an additional single before McComas was dropped from Lyric Street. He later signed to Katapult Records, which released his second album, Back Up Again, in 2006.

== Biography ==
McComas was born in Bethesda, Maryland, and his family moved to Harrison, Arkansas when he was four years old. At age sixteen, he attended a Paul Overstreet concert; while at the concert, Overstreet gave McComas the address of his publishing company. McComas submitted a demo tape to the publishing company, who then encouraged him to continue working on his writing skills.

McComas later attended college, but soon dropped out to move to Nashville, Tennessee. He briefly signed with Mercury Records, before he landed a deal with Lyric Street in 2001, charting the singles "Night Disappear With You" and "I Could Never Love You Enough." In 2003, he landed his first Top 10, "99.9% Sure (I've Never Been Here Before)" and the follow-up "You're in My Head", a No. 21 hit on the country charts. Another single for Lyric Street, "The Middle of Nowhere", fell short of the Top 40, and Lyric Street dropped him not long afterward. He later signed to Katapult Records, where he released Back Up Again, his second album.

== Discography ==
=== Studio albums ===
| Title | Album details | Peak chart positions | | |
| Title | Album details | US Country | US | US Heat |
|---|---|---|---|---|
| Brian McComas | Release date: July 22, 2003; Label: Lyric Street Records | 21 | 149 | 4 |
| Back Up Again | Release date: August 29, 2006; Label: Katapult Records | — | — | — |
"—" denotes releases that did not chart

=== Singles ===
| Year | Single | Peak chart positions | | Album |
| Year | Single | US Country | US | Album |
|---|---|---|---|---|
| 2001 | "Night Disappear with You" | 41 | — | Brian McComas |
| 2002 | "I Could Never Love You Enough" | 46 | — | Brian McComas |
| 2003 | "99.9% Sure (I've Never Been Here Before)" | 10 | 57 | Brian McComas |
| 2004 | "You're in My Head" | 21 | —^{A} | Brian McComas |
| 2005 | "The Middle of Nowhere" | 43 | — | — |
| 2005 | "Good, Good Lovin'" | 53 | — | Back Up Again |
| 2006 | "All Comes Floodin' Down" | — | — | Back Up Again |
"—" denotes releases that did not chart

- ^{A}"You're in My Head" did not enter the Hot 100, but peaked at number 18 on Bubbling Under Hot 100 Singles.

=== Music videos ===
| Year | Video | Director |
|---|---|---|
| 2002 | "I Could Never Love You Enough" | Deaton-Flanigen Productions |
| 2003 | "99.9% Sure (I've Never Been Here Before)" | Brent Hedgecock |
| 2003 | "You're in My Head" | Brent Hedgecock |
| 2006 | "Good, Good Lovin'" | Roman White |
