= Sweet Right Here =

Studio album by SHeDAISY
- Released: June 8, 2004
- Studios: Sound Emporium Studios, Jane's Place, Emerald Entertainment and Paragon Studios (Nashville, Tennessee)
- Genre: Country
- Length: 46:43
- Label: Lyric Street
- Producers: Dann Huff; SHeDAISY

SHeDAISY chronology
Knock on the Sky (2002)	Sweet Right Here (2004)	Fortuneteller's Melody (2006)

Singles from Sweet Right Here
- 1. "Passenger Seat" Released: February 2, 2004; 2. "Come Home Soon" Released: July 12, 2004; 3. "Don't Worry 'bout a Thing" Released: January 24, 2005

Professional ratings
Review scores
Source	Rating
Allmusic	3/5 stars

Sweet Right Here is the fourth studio album by American country music group SHeDAISY. It was released on June 8, 2004, through Lyric Street Records. The album was produced by SHeDAISY and frequent collaborator Dann Huff. Group member Kristyn Osborn wrote or co-wrote all the songs, collaborating with songwriters like John Shanks, Trey Bruce, and Connie Harrington.

Peaking at number two on the country albums chart behind Here for the Party (2004) by Gretchen Wilson, the album was seen as a commercial comeback for the group following the underperformance of their previous studio album Knock on the Sky (2002) and spawned three top-twenty consecutive country hits in the forms of "Passenger Seat", "Come Home Soon", and "Don't Worry 'bout a Thing". It is their second most successful album, having been certified Gold by the RIAA for shipments of 500,000 copies.

== Singles ==
"Passenger Seat" was released on February 2, 2004, as the lead single from the record. It rose to number 12 on the US Hot Country Songs chart. "Come Home Soon" was the second single, released on July 12, 2004, and peaked at number 14 on the Hot Country Songs chart. "Don't Worry 'bout a Thing" was the third and final single, released on January 24, 2005. It peaked at number 7 on the country charts.

== Commercial performance ==
Sweet Right Here debuted at number two on the US Billboard Top Country Albums chart for the week of June 26, 2004, selling 41,897 copies in its first week. It simultaneously debuted at number 16 on the Billboard 200. It spent 86 weeks on the country albums chart and was certified Gold by the RIAA for shipments of 500,000 copies in the United States.

== Track listing ==
All tracks are written by Kristyn Osborn; co-writers as indicated.

Standard track listing
No.	Title	Writer(s)	Length
1.	"Passenger Seat"	Connie Harrington	3:25
2.	"5 4 3 2 Run"	Rick Neigher	3:56
3.	"360° of You"	Harrington	3:46
4.	"Love Goes On"	Jason Deere	4:18
5.	"I Dare You"	Deere	3:34
6.	"Good Together (Bucket and Chicken)"	Harrington	3:26
7.	"Come Home Soon"	John Shanks	4:02
8.	"Don't Worry 'bout a Thing"	Deere	3:35
9.	"Without a Sound"	Trina Harmon	3:41
10.	"Borrowed Home"	Neigher	3:34
11.	"A Woman's Work"	Trey Bruce	5:26
12.	"He's a Hero"		3:56
Total length:			46:43

Target exclusive bonus tracks
No.	Title	Writer(s)	Length
13.	"Whose Life Am I In"	Shanks	4:03
14.	"Shame"	Neigher; Melanie Doane	3:28
Total length:			54:14

Walmart exclusive download bonus tracks
No.	Title	Length
13.	"Unlove You"	4:11
14.	"With You I Feel"	?:??

== Personnel ==
Taken from the album booklet.

SHeDAISY

- Kassidy Osborn – high harmony vocals
- Kelsi Osborn – lead vocals
- Kristyn Osborn – low harmony vocals

Musicians

- Tim Akers – keyboards (7)
- Jimmy Nichols – acoustic piano (9)
- Charlie Judge – keyboards (12)
- Dann Huff – guitars
- Gordon Kennedy – guitars
- Jerry McPherson – guitars
- Dan Dugmore – steel guitar
- Jonathan Yudkin – banjo, mandolin, fiddle, cello, violin, harmonica (3)
- Glenn Worf – bass (1, 2, 5, 7, 8)
- Jimmie Lee Sloas – bass (3, 4, 6, 10-12)
- Shannon Forrest – drums
- Eric Darken – percussion
- Jim Hoke – harmonica (2), Jew's harp (2)

=== Production ===
- Randy Goodman – A&R direction
- Doug Howard – A&R direction
- Dann Huff – producer
- SHeDAISY – producers
- Jeff Balding – recording, mixing (2-12)
- Brady Barnett – recording
- Mark Hagen – recording
- Justin Niebank – mixing (1)
- David Bryant – recording assistant, mix assistant (2-12)
- Chad Carlson – recording assistant
- Jay Fenstermaker – recording assistant
- Drew Bollman – mix assistant (1)
- Scott Kidd – mix assistant (2-12)
- Greg Lawrence – mix assistant (2-12)
- Christopher Rowe – digital editing
- Adam Ayan – mastering at Gateway Mastering (Portland, Maine)
- Mike "Frog" Griffith – production coordinator
- Sherri Halford – creative direction
- Greg McCarn – creative direction
- Glenn Sweitzer – art direction, design
- Kristin Barlowe – photography
- Giovanni Giuliano – hair
- Leiane Taylor – make-up
- Daniel Caudill – wardrobe

== Charts ==
=== Weekly charts ===
Chart (2004)	Peak position
US Billboard 200	16
US Top Country Albums (Billboard)	2

=== Year-end charts ===
Chart (2004)	Position
US Top Country Albums (Billboard)	55
Chart (2005)	Position
US Top Country Albums (Billboard)	50

== Certifications ==
Region	Certification	Certified units/sales
United States (RIAA)	Gold	500,000^{^}
^{^} Shipments figures based on certification alone.
