= I'm Taking the Wheel =

Single by SHeDAISY

from the album Fortuneteller's Melody
- Released: November 14, 2005
- Genre: Country
- Length: 3:14
- Label: Lyric Street
- Songwriters: Kristyn Osborn; John Shanks
- Producer: John Shanks

SHeDAISY singles chronology
| "Don't Worry 'bout a Thing" (2005) | "I'm Taking the Wheel" (2005) | "In Terms of Love" (2006) |

Music video
- "I'm Taking the Wheel" at CMT.com

"I'm Taking the Wheel" is a song recorded by American country music group SHeDAISY for their fifth and final studio album Fortuneteller's Melody (2006). Member Kristyn Osborn wrote the single with John Shanks, who also produced it. It was released as the lead single by Lyric Street Records on November 14, 2005.

The single peaked at number 21 on the US Hot Country Songs chart.

== Music video ==
The music video starts with the trio performing in front of an audience and shows Kristyn Osborn and her boyfriend (her then real-life boyfriend Aaron Eckhart) arguing in the car while driving on a road in the city trying to find their way. Throughout the video the trio continue to perform on stage while Kristyn and her boyfriend continue to argue. When the two stop for gas, Kristyn takes the wheel while her boyfriend is pumping gas. Her boyfriend slides into the passenger seat and Kristyn drives quickly through the city, making her boyfriend nervous. Toward the end of the video, Kristyn pulls the car over by sliding it into place, at this time the car overheats and her boyfriend is angry. Kristyn decides the best way to say she is sorry is by giving him a long kiss, which eventually ends up with him kissing her on the hood of the car. The trio finishes up their performance and the video fades out. The video was directed by Trey Fanjoy.

== Charts ==
=== Weekly charts ===
| Chart (2005–2006) | Peak position |
|---|---|
| US Hot Country Songs (Billboard) | 21 |
| US Bubbling Under Hot 100 (Billboard) | 14 |

=== Year-end charts ===
| Chart (2006) | Position |
|---|---|
| US Country (Radio & Records) | 85 |

== Release history ==
Release dates and format(s) for "I'm Taking the Wheel"
| Region | Date | Format(s) | Label(s) | Ref. |
|---|---|---|---|---|
| United States | November 14, 2005 | Country radio | Lyric Street | |
