= In Terms of Love =

Single by SHeDAISY

from the album Fortuneteller's Melody
- Released: May 1, 2006
- Genre: Country
- Length: 3:41
- Label: Lyric Street
- Songwriters: Kristyn Osborn; Don Schlitz
- Producer: John Shanks

SHeDAISY singles chronology
"I'm Taking the Wheel" (2005)	"In Terms of Love" (2006)	"Bucket Full of Beautiful" (2009)

Music video
- "In Terms of Love" on YouTube

"In Terms of Love" is a song by American country music group SHeDAISY. The song was written by member Kristyn Osborn and Don Schlitz, and was produced by John Shanks. The song was released as the second and final single from the group's fifth and final studio album Fortuneteller's Melody (2006).

The track peaked at number 32 on the US Hot Country Songs chart.

== Music video ==
The music video for "In Terms of Love" was directed by Andrew MacNaughtan. The video is shot in black and white and features the members of SHeDAISY against a black or curtain background while a male model is featured in a home. This video notably does not include member Kelsi Osborn due to her at the time giving birth; the group's youngest sister, Karli Osborn, is featured in replacement for Kelsi.

== Commercial performance ==
"In Terms of Love" debuted on the US Billboard Hot Country Songs chart the week of June 3, 2006 at number 47, becoming the highest debut of the week. The track reached number 32 on August 19, 2006, spending 17 weeks in total.

== Charts ==
Chart (2006)	Peak position
US Hot Country Songs (Billboard)	32
