= Mine All Mine (Tara Lyn Hart song) =

Single by SHeDAISY

from the album Knock on the Sky and Sweet Home Alabama Soundtrack
- Released: May 13, 2002
- Genre: Country
- Length: 3:57
- Label: Lyric Street; Hollywood
- Songwriters: Kristyn Osborn, Hollie Poole
- Producers: Dann Huff, SHeDAISY

SHeDAISY singles chronology
"Get Over Yourself" (2002)	"Mine All Mine" (2002)	"Passenger Seat" (2004)

"Mine All Mine" is a song written by Kristyn Osborn and Hollie Poole which became a hit for American country music group SHeDAISY in 2002. It was originally recorded by Canadian singer Tara Lyn Hart for her 1999 self-titled debut album. SHeDAISY recorded it for their third studio album Knock on the Sky. It was included in the soundtrack for the film Sweet Home Alabama. It was released on May 13, 2002, as the second and final single from the album.

SHeDAISY's version of "Mine All Mine" peaked at number 28 on the US Hot Country Songs chart.

== Charts ==
Chart (2002)	Peak position
US Hot Country Songs (Billboard)	28

=== Year end charts ===
Chart (2002)	Position
US Country (Radio & Records)	90

== Release history ==
Release dates and format(s) for "Mine All Mine"
Region	Date	Format(s)	Label(s)	Ref.
United States	May 13, 2002	Country radio	Lyric Street	
