= Come Home Soon =

- Advertisement from Billboard Radio Monitor magazine on October 1, 2004

Single by SHeDAISY

from the album Sweet Right Here
- Released: July 12, 2004
- Genre: Country
- Length: 4:03
- Label: Lyric Street
- Songwriters: Kristyn Osborn; John Shanks
- Producers: Dann Huff; SHeDAISY

SHeDAISY singles chronology
"Passenger Seat" (2004)	"Come Home Soon" (2004)	"Don't Worry 'bout a Thing" (2005)

"Come Home Soon" is a song recorded by American country music group SHeDAISY. It was released on July 12, 2004, as the second single from fourth studio album Sweet Right Here (2004). The song was written by member Kristyn Osborn with John Shanks, and was produced by Dann Huff and SHeDAISY. It peaked at number 14 on the US Hot Country Songs chart, becoming their sixth top-20 hit. It also reached number 75 on the all-genre Billboard Hot 100.

== Content ==
The song is a ballad about a woman who expresses the loneliness of her husband, who is a deployed service member, and pleads him to "come home soon". According to Osborn, "it could be relatable to anyone who is separated from a loved one. But it was inspired by the circumstances of a soldier being taken away from his family and sent to do something he didn't understand or really want to do."

The group sold "Come Home Soon" bracelets with all proceeds going to the American Red Cross.

== Music video ==
The music video was directed by Steven Goldmann and premiered in mid-2004. It depicts the three sisters, plus many others, walking down a street at night holding candles at a vigil, ending with a message that reads "For all our heroes, here at home".

== Charts ==
"Come Home Soon" debuted at number 51 on the U.S. Billboard Hot Country Songs chart for the week of July 10, 2004.

Chart (2004)	Peak position
US Hot Country Songs (Billboard)	14
US Billboard Hot 100	75

== Release history ==
Release dates and formats for "Come Home Soon"
Region	Date	Format	Label(s)	Ref.
United States	July 12, 2004	Country radio	Lyric Street	
