= I Will... But =

Single by SHeDAISY

from the album The Whole SHeBANG
- Released: April 17, 2000
- Genre: Country
- Length: 3:40
- Label: Lyric Street
- Songwriters: Kristyn Osborn; Jason Deere
- Producer: Dann Huff

SHeDAISY singles chronology
"This Woman Needs" (1999)	"I Will... But" (2000)	"Lucky 4 You (Tonight I'm Just Me)" (2000)

"I Will... But" is a song recorded by American country music group SHeDAISY for their debut studio album The Whole SHeBANG (1999). The song was written by member Kristyn Osborn and Jason Deere and produced by Dann Huff. Lyric Street Records released the song on April 17, 2000, as the third single from the album.

It is SHeDAISY's highest-peaking single on the country charts, peaking at number two on the US Hot Country Songs for three consecutive weeks. It was also a hit on the Canadian RPM Country Tracks chart, reaching a peak of number three.

== Music video ==
Directed by Shaun Silva, the video focuses on the trio at various concerts, as well as black-and-white shots of them doing goofy things. They are also seen performing the song in a parking garage, and while sitting on top of a bar.

The music video premiered to Country Music Television on March 31, 2000.

== Chart performance ==
"I Will... But" initially entered the US Hot Country Songs the week of January 15, 2000, at number 65 solely on unsolicited airplay. It charted for a few weeks as an album track, reaching as high as number 61 the week of March 18. As an official single, the song rose to number 59 on April 15, 2000. The song entered the top-forty the week of May 6, 2000 at number 36. "I Will... But" slowly rose up the charts, entering the top ten on August 5, 2000, at number ten. It rose up to number eight the following week. The song then rose to a position of number four, where it stayed for three weeks. On September 23, 2000, "I Will... But" rose to its peak position of number two on the Hot Country Songs chart, where it stayed for three weeks. In total, "I Will... But" spent eleven weeks in the top ten and 44 weeks overall. It ended 2000 as the tenth most successful song at country radio.

"I Will... But" debuted on the Canadian RPM Country Tracks on April 24, 2000, at number 75, the second highest debut of the week. The song rose to number 71 the week after before rising to number 59. The song entered the top-forty the week of June 5, 2000, at number 36. The song steadily rose up to the top ten on July 31, 2000, at number 10. The next week, the song rose to number 7. On August 28, 2000, "I Will... But" rose to its peak position of number three. It stayed there for three weeks and 29 weeks in total on the chart before RPM stopped publication in November 2000.

== Charts ==
Chart (2000)	Peak position
Canada Country Singles (RPM)	3
US Billboard Hot 100	43
US Hot Country Songs (Billboard)	2

=== Year-end charts ===
Chart (2000)	Position
US Country Songs (Billboard)	10
