= Music from and Inspired by Desperate Housewives =

Soundtrack album by Various artists
- Released: September 20, 2005
- Genre: Pop; Country
- Length: 52:26
- Label: Hollywood
- Producer: Bonnie Greenberg; Christopher Thorn; David Lyndon Huff; Dann Huff; Emilio Estefan; Eric Bradley Smith; Jamie Houston; Jann Arden; John Alagia; k.d. lang; Lawerance P. Dermer; Macy Gray; Marc Cherry; Mark Goodman; Martina McBride; Matt Evans; Matt Serletic; Mitchell Leib; Peter Collins; Robert John "Mutt" Lange; Russell Broom; Sabrina Wind; Sara Evans; Teddy Borowiecki

Singles from Music from and Inspired by Desperate Housewives
- 1. "Shoes" Released: August 29, 2005; 2. "God Bless the Canadian Housewife" Released: October 2005

Professional ratings
Review scores
Source	Rating
Allmusic	3/5 stars

Music from and Inspired by Desperate Housewives is the soundtrack to the ABC television series Desperate Housewives. It was released in 2005 by Hollywood Records and distributed by Universal Music.

As the album title implies, most of the songs on the album were "inspired by" the series but did not appear in it. None of the songs had been used in the series at the time the album was released (aside from the instrumental theme song), but "Band of Gold" and "Boom Boom" later made appearances. In addition to the songs, the album includes brief dialogue excerpts from the series.

Two official singles were released from the compilation, both of which were moderate successes. The lead, "Shoes", which was recorded by Canadian country pop singer Shania Twain, received mixed to negative reviews but became a minor success, peaking as high as number 29 on both the Billboard Hot Country Songs and Radio & Records Country Top 50 charts. While never released in the United States, the song "God Bless the American Housewife" (re-made in Canada as "God Bless the Canadian Housewife") by SHeDAISY became a minor top-20 hit on the Radio & Records Canada Country Top 30 chart.

== Track listing ==
Standard edition
No.	Title	Writer(s)	Performer(s)	Length
1.	"Mary Alice"		Mary Alice Young (Brenda Strong)	0:48
2.	"God Bless the American Housewife"	Jann Arden Richards; Russell Broom	SHeDAISY	3:43
3.	"Edie"		Edie Britt (Nicollette Sheridan)	0:04
4.	"Shoes"	Joie Scott; Kim Tribble; Robert John "Mutt" Lange; Shania Twain; Tammy Hyler	Shania Twain	3:55
5.	"Band of Gold"	Edythe Wayne; Ronald Dunbar	Anna Nalick	3:11
6.	"Lynette"		Lynette Scavo (Felicity Huffman)	0:13
7.	"Mother's Little Helper"	Keith Richards & Mick Jagger	Liz Phair	3:02
8.	"Mrs. Robinson"	Paul Simon	Indigo Girls	3:46
9.	"Harper Valley PTA"	Tom T. Hall	Martina McBride	3:26
10.	"Bree"		Bree Van de Kamp (Marcia Cross)	0:06
11.	"We're Running Out of Time"	Tena Rix Clark; Tim Heintz	LeAnn Rimes	4:07
12.	"Treat Me Right (I'm Yours for Life)"	Diane Warren	Joss Stone	4:01
13.	"One's on the Way"	Shel Silverstein	Sara Evans	3:22
14.	"Gabrielle"		Gabrielle Solis (Eva Longoria)	0:04
15.	"Boom Boom"	Boots Ottestad; Jeff Cohen	Macy Gray	2:40
16.	"Young Hearts Run Free"	David B. Crawford	Gloria Estefan	3:45
17.	"Susan"		Susan Mayer (Teri Hatcher)	0:06
18.	"Damsel in Distress"	Jamie O'Neal; Jimmy Murphy; Pat Murphy	Idina Menzel	3:08
19.	"Dreams of the Everyday Housewife"	Chris Gantry	k.d. lang	3:53
20.	"Mary Alice"		Mary Alice Young	0:12
21.	"Desperate Housewives Theme" / "Wisteria Lane"	Danny Elfman / uncredited	Danny Elfman / Marc Cherry	2:23
Total length:				52:26

The Desperate Housewives theme itself is 40 seconds long. Track 21 appends "Wisteria Lane," a hidden track performed by the series' creator, following 20 seconds of silence.

Canadian edition
No.	Title	Writer(s)	Performer(s)	Length
21.	"Desperate Housewives Theme"	Elfman	Danny Elfman	6:07
22.	"God Bless the Canadian Housewife"	Richards; Broom	SHeDAISY	3:43
23.	"Wisteria Lane"	uncredited	Marc Cherry	1:24

The Canadian edition instead appends five and a half minutes of silence to track 21, then adds "God Bless the Canadian Housewife" and "Wisteria Lane" as separate tracks.
