= God Bless the American Housewife =

2005 song by SHeDAISY

Promotional single by SHeDAISY

from the album Music from and Inspired by Desperate Housewives
- Released: September 25, 2005
- Genre: Country
- Length: 3:43
- Label: Hollywood; Lyric Street
- Songwriter(s): Jann Arden; Russell Broom
- Producer(s): Dann Huff

"God Bless the American Housewife" is a song recorded by American country music group SHeDAISY. It was written by Jann Arden and Russell Broom and produced by Dann Huff. The song first appeared in the TV soundtrack Music from and Inspired by Desperate Housewives (2005), which was released as the soundtrack to the ABC television show Desperate Housewives.

The song charted in Canada as "God Bless the Canadian Housewife", released as a hidden track on the Canadian version of the Desperate Housewives soundtrack. This version peaked at number 19 on the Radio & Records Canada Country chart. A music video was released.

== Music video ==
A music video was commissioned for the song which was directed by Marcus Raboy. The video was directed at the Universal Studios Hollywood back lot where the show was filmed. The three members of SHeDAISY are on the porch of Gabrielle Solis's house, with Solis played by Eva Longoria. The video began airing to CMT and GAC in December 2005 and later to the Disney Channel, ABC, ABC Family and SoapNet in January 2006 to promote Desperate Housewives.

== Chart performance ==
"God Bless the Canadian Housewife" entered the Radio & Records Canada Country Top 30 the week of October 28, 2005 at number 26. It peaked at number 19 during the week of November 18, 2005, and stayed there for three weeks. In total, the song spent nine weeks on the chart.

== Charts ==
| Chart (2005) | Peak position |
|---|---|
| Canada Country (Radio & Records) | 19 |
