= This Woman Needs =

Single by SHeDAISY

from the album The Whole SHeBANG
- Released: September 27, 1999
- Genre: Country
- Length: 3:20
- Label: Lyric Street
- Songwriters: Connie Harrington; Bonnie Baker; Kristyn Osborn
- Producer: Dann Huff

SHeDAISY singles chronology
"Little Good-Byes" (1999)	"This Woman Needs" (1999)	"I Will… But" (2000)

"This Woman Needs" is a song written by Kristyn Osborn, Bonnie Baker and Connie Harrington, and recorded by American country music group SHeDAISY. It was released on September 27, 1999 as the second single from their debut album The Whole SHeBANG. The song peaked at number 9 on the Billboard Hot Country Singles & Tracks chart in March 2000. It also reached number 18 on the RPM Country Tracks chart in Canada.

== Charts ==
"This Woman Needs" debuted at number 70 on the U.S. Billboard Hot Country Singles & Tracks for the week of September 4, 1999.

Chart (1999–2000)	Peak position
Canada Country Singles (RPM)	18
US Billboard Hot 100	57
US Hot Country Songs (Billboard)	9

=== Year-end charts ===
Chart (2000)	Position
US Country Songs (Billboard)	48

== Release history ==
Release dates and format(s) for "This Woman Needs"
Region	Date	Format(s)	Label(s)	Ref.
United States	September 27, 1999	Country radio	Lyric Street	
