= Tara Lyn Hart (album) =

Studio album by Tara Lyn Hart
- Released: October 5, 1999
- Genre: Country
- Label: Epic
- Producer: Josh Leo, Peter Asher, Walter Afanasieff, Dann Huff, Tom Shapiro, Barry Beckett

Tara Lyn Hart is the only album by Canadian country music artist Tara Lyn Hart. It was released by Epic Records on October 5, 1999. The album peaked at number 30 on the RPM Country Albums chart.

== Critical reception ==
Murray Lyons of the Star-Phoenix praised Hart's vocals and the album's lyrics, although he also thought the album contained too many ballads.

== Track listing ==
1. "Stuff That Matters" (David Martin) – 3:28
2. "One Heart" (Martin, Dave Pickell) – 3:38
3. "Save Me" (Tara Lyn Hart, Hal Draper, David Quilico) – 2:54
4. "What He Used to Do" (Draper, Quilico) – 3:34
5. "Mine All Mine" (Kristyn Osborn, Hollie Poole) – 3:22
6. "You Can Get There from Here" (Martin, Hart) – 3:25
7. "That's When You Came Along" (Hart, Steven Moccio) – 4:06
8. "Hearts and Arrows" (Martin, Dean McTaggart) – 4:07
9. "You Again" (Alex Dadario, Martin, Hart) – 3:56
10. "Baby, What About You" (Josh Leo, Wendy Waldman) – 3:15
11. "A Rose Is a Rose" (Wayne Kirkpatrick) – 4:03
12. "Love Ought to Work That Way" (Annie Roboff, Waldman) – 3:03
13. "Greatest Story" (Quilico, Hart) – 3:34
14. "I Will Be Loving You" (Martin) – 3:31

== Charts ==
| Chart (1999) | Peak position |
|---|---|
| Canadian RPM Country Albums | 30 |
