= Passenger Seat (SHeDAISY song) =

2004 single by SHeDAISY

Single by SHeDAISY

from the album Sweet Right Here
- Released: February 2, 2004
- Genre: Country
- Length: 3:25
- Label: Lyric Street
- Songwriters: Kristyn Osborn; Connie Harrington
- Producers: Dann Huff; SHeDAISY

SHeDAISY singles chronology
"Mine All Mine" (2002)	"Passenger Seat" (2004)	"Come Home Soon" (2004)

Music video
- "Passenger Seat" on YouTube

"Passenger Seat" is a song by the American country music recording group SHeDAISY for their fourth studio album Sweet Right Here (2004). Written by member Kristyn Osborn and Connie Harrington and produced by Dann Huff and the group, it was released to country radio on February 2, 2004 via Lyric Street Records as the lead single to the album. It became their fifth top-twenty single, hitting number 12 on the US Billboard Hot Country Songs chart.

== Content ==
The lyrics to "Passenger Seat" describe the feelings of being in love and make reference to life being sweeter in the "passenger seat".

== Music video ==
Kristin Barlowe directed the music video for "Passenger Seat". It was shot in Fontana, California, where the members and the crew had to deal with high winds with gusts up to 50 miles per hour.

== Charts ==
"Passenger Seat" debuted at number 44 on the U.S. Billboard Hot Country Singles & Tracks for the week of February 7, 2004. The song spent 20 weeks on the U.S. Billboard Hot Country Singles & Tracks chart, reaching a peak of number 12 in June 2004.

Chart (2004)	Peak position
US Hot Country Songs (Billboard)	12
US Billboard Hot 100	66
US Country Top 50 (Radio & Records)	9

=== Year-end charts ===
Chart (2004)	Position
US Country Songs (Billboard)	57
US Country (Radio & Records)	54
