= Get Over Yourself (SHeDAISY song) =

Single by SHeDAISY

from the album Knock on the Sky
- Released: March 11, 2002
- Genre: Country
- Length: 3:24
- Label: Lyric Street
- Songwriters: Kristyn Osborn, Marcus Hummon
- Producers: Dann Huff, SHeDAISY

SHeDAISY singles chronology
"Still Holding Out for You" (2001)	"Get Over Yourself" (2002)	"Mine All Mine" (2002)

"Get Over Yourself" is a song recorded by American country music group SHeDAISY. Member Kristyn Osborn co-wrote the song with Marcus Hummon, with SHeDAISY and Dann Huff producing the song. The song was released through Lyric Street Records on March 11, 2002, as the lead single from the group's third studio album Knock on the Sky (2002).

The song had a negative reception at country radio. The song peaked at number 27 on the US Hot Country Songs chart and only spent 14 weeks in total.

== Critical reception ==
In a review for the album as a whole, Billboard gave the song a negative review by simply saying "'Get Over Yourself' is just plain annoying."

== Chart performance ==
"Get Over Yourself" debuted on the Billboard Hot Country Songs the week of March 9, 2002 at number 52, becoming the "Hot Shot Debut" of the week. The song rose to number 47 the following week. The song entered the top-forty at number 36 on March 30. The song rose to its peak position of number 27 the week of May 11, 2002, staying there for two weeks and staying 14 weeks overall on the chart. Billboard noted that the song failed at country radio due to many programmers feeling that the song was a "male-bashing anthem".

== Charts ==
Chart (2002)	Peak position
US Hot Country Songs (Billboard)	27

=== Year-end charts ===
Chart (2002)	Position
US Country (Radio & Records)	99

== Release history ==
Release dates and format(s) for "Get Over Yourself"
Region	Date	Format(s)	Label(s)	Ref.
United States	March 11, 2002	Country radio	Lyric Street	
