= Coley McCabe =

American country music singer

- Born: McConnellsburg, Pennsylvania, United States
- Genres: Country
- Occupation(s): Singer, songwriter, musician
- Instrument: Vocals
- Years active: 2000–2001
- Labels: RCA Nashville
- Spouse: Thom Shepherd

Coley McCabe Shepherd is an American country music singer. In 2000, she signed to RCA Records Nashville and released two singles. The first of these, "Grow Young with You" (a duet with labelmate Andy Griggs), was also included in the soundtrack to the 2000 film Where the Heart Is. A second single entitled "Who I Am to You" followed, but McCabe never released an album. She also co-wrote SHeDAISY's 2001 single "Lucky 4 You (Tonight I'm Just Me)."

== Biography ==
Born in McConnellsburg, Pennsylvania and raised in Hedgesville, West Virginia, McCabe frequently sang at the Jamboree USA Music Hall in Wheeling, West Virginia as a youth. According to The Tennessean newspaper, while still in junior college, "her sister and father were killed in separate car accidents, and her mother died of a pulmonary embolism, leaving her to take care of her younger sister," who later went on to attend college. By 1995, McCabe was a resident of Nashville, Tennessee, where she worked for an airline company. One of her earliest songwriting contracts was signed in 1997.

McCabe was signed by RCA Records in 2000, and has released several singles, including "Grow Young with You," which was used for the film soundtrack of Where the Heart Is. She and country music singer and composer Thom Shepherd were married in Las Vegas in 2015.

== Discography ==
=== Singles ===
Year	Single	Peak positions	Album
Year	Single	US Country	Album
2000	"Grow Young with You" (with Andy Griggs)	50	Where the Heart Is soundtrack
2001	"Who I Am to You"	56	single only

=== Music videos ===
Year	Video
2000	"Grow Young with You" (with Andy Griggs)
2011	"I'm Not Made That Way"
2011	"I Don't Love U Anymore
2011	"Sand in her shoes" (Thom Shepherd)
