= Still Holding Out for You =

Single by SHeDAISY

from the album The Whole SHeBANG
- Released: April 16, 2001
- Genre: Country
- Length: 4:21
- Label: Lyric Street
- Songwriter(s): Kristyn Osborn, Richard Marx
- Producer(s): Dann Huff

SHeDAISY singles chronology
"Lucky 4 You (Tonight I'm Just Me)" (2000)	"Still Holding Out for You" (2001)	"Get Over Yourself" (2002)

"Still Holding Out For You" is a song recorded by American country music group SHeDAISY. The song was written by member Kristyn Osborn and American singer Richard Marx. It was also produced by Dann Huff. The song was released on April 16, 2001 as the fifth and final single from the group's debut studio album The Whole SHeBANG (1999). The song appeared in two trailers for the 2001 Disney direct-to-video film Lady and the Tramp II: Scamp's Adventure.

The song peaked at number 27 on the US Hot Country Songs chart.

== Charts ==
Chart (2001)	Peak position
US Hot Country Songs (Billboard)	27

== Release history ==
Release dates and format(s) for "Still Holding Out for You"
Region	Date	Format(s)	Label(s)	Ref.
United States	April 16, 2001	Country radio	Lyric Street	
