= Tara Lyn Hart =

Canadian singer (born 1978)

- Born: Tara Lyn Mohr; April 11, 1978 (age 48)
- Origin: Roblin, Manitoba, Canada
- Genres: Country; Christian Contemporary
- Occupations: Singer, songwriter
- Instrument: Vocals
- Years active: 1999 – 2010
- Labels: Epic; Columbia Nashville; SIP Music

Tara Lyn Hart (née Mohr; born April 11, 1978) is a Canadian country music singer. She released one self-titled album for Epic Records in 1999, which charted singles on the country music charts of both Canada and the United States.

== Biography ==
Tara Lyn Mohr was born in Manitoba. She won a music contest at the age of 17, which enabled her to record demos to be distributed to Canadian country radio. Chantal Kreviazuk's manager Danny Schur passed her recordings to Sony Music Canada's Mike Roth, which led to a recording contract with Epic Records on the eve of her 18th birthday and two weeks before her wedding.

In 1998, Hart was named Billboard magazine's "Most Likely to Succeed". Her self-titled debut album was released on October 5, 1999. At the 2000 Juno Awards, she was nominated for Best Country Female Artist and the all-genre Best New Solo Artist. In April 2000, she was invited to perform at the Grand Ole Opry.

Hart won three awards at the 2000 Manitoba Association of Country Arts Awards for Female Vocalist, Song of the Year, and Video of the Year for "Stuff That Matters." On June 9, 2000, she won two awards at RPM's Big Country Awards for Outstanding New Female Artist and Canadian Country Video of the Year for "Stuff That Matters."

She was nominated for six awards at the 2000 Canadian Country Music Association (CCMA) Awards, won the FACTOR Rising Star Award at the September 11, 2000, ceremony, and picked up two more nominations at the 2000 Prairie Music Awards for Outstanding Country Recording and Outstanding Album by a Major Label.

At the 2001 Juno Awards, Hart was again nominated for Best Country Female Artist. She also picked up a nomination for Female Vocalist of the Year at the 2001 CCMA Awards, competing against Lisa Brokop, Terri Clark, Carolyn Dawn Johnson and Michelle Wright.

She began work on her second album in June 2003, and the first single, "Happiness," was released in September. Before the album was finished, Hart abandoned the project to spend more time with her husband and their three children.

She began work on a musical comedy, "Miss Kitty's Holiday Extravaganza," which ran from October to December 2004. In November 2010 she released a six-song Christmas EP, Perfect Holiday.

== Discography ==
=== Albums ===
Title	Details	Peak positions
Title	Details	CAN Country
Tara Lyn Hart	Release date: October 5, 1999; Label: Epic Records	30

=== Extended plays ===
Title	Details
Perfect Holiday	Release date: November 30, 2010; Label: Independent

=== Singles ===
Year	Single	Peak chart positions			Album
Year	Single	CAN Country	CAN AC	US Country	Album
1999	"Stuff That Matters"	6	—	67	Tara Lyn Hart
2000	"Save Me"	5	—	—	Tara Lyn Hart
2000	"Don't Ever Let Me Go"	—	—	65	—N/a
2000	"That's When You Came Along"	—	35	68	Tara Lyn Hart
2000	"I Will Be Loving You"	14	—	—	Tara Lyn Hart
2000	"What He Used to Do"	28	—	—	Tara Lyn Hart
2003	"Happiness"	—	—	—	—N/a
"—" denotes releases that did not chart

=== Music videos ===
Year	Video	Director
1999	"Stuff That Matters"	Morgan Lawley
2000	"That's When You Came Along"	chris rogers
2000	"What He Used to Do"	

== Awards and nominations ==
Year	Association	Category	Result
2000	Juno Awards of 2000	Best New Solo Artist	Nominated
2000	Juno Awards of 2000	Best Country Female Artist	Nominated
2000	Canadian Country Music Association	Female Artist of the Year	Nominated
2000	Canadian Country Music Association	FACTOR Rising Star Award	Won
2000	Canadian Country Music Association	Album of the Year – Tara Lyn Hart	Nominated
2000	Canadian Country Music Association	Single of the Year – "Stuff That Matters"	Nominated
2000	Canadian Country Music Association	Video of the Year – "Stuff That Matters"	Nominated
2001	Juno Awards of 2001	Best Country Female Artist	Nominated
2001	Canadian Country Music Association	Female Artist of the Year	Nominated
2004	Canadian Country Music Association	Independent Female Artist of the Year	Nominated
