= Jason Deere =

American singer-songwriter (born 1968)

- Born: Jason Todd Deere; December 19, 1968 (age 57); Enid, Oklahoma, United States
- Occupations: singer, songwriter, record producer

Jason Todd Deere (born December 19, 1968) is an American singer, songwriter, record producer and music executive. He has written memorable songs for acts like Lady Antebellum, Little Big Town, LeAnn Rimes, Jessica Simpson, Cory Marks, Jim Brickman, SHeDAISY, Marie Osmond, Be Be Winans, Natalie Grant, Point of Grace, Wanessa Camargo, Leonardo, Luiza Possi, The Wreckers and he has a lengthy list of film, television and production credits.

== Biography ==
Jason Deere was born on Vance Air Force Base in Enid, Oklahoma, United States. By the time he was three years old his family moved to Norman, Oklahoma where he lived until he graduated from Norman High School in 1987. His fire for music was lit the day he sang in front of his second grade class (Glen Campbell's Rhinestone Cowboy). He began writing songs in high school and played in local bands around Oklahoma. After spending a year at Brigham Young University, where he started as a freshman on BYU's rugby team, and after serving a two-year mission for his church, Deere finished his education at the University of Oklahoma in 1994 with a degree in English Literature. He then moved to Nashville, Tennessee where he has resided since.

== Success as a songwriter, producer and remixer ==
Deere has made a career out of writing hit songs and developing hit artists. He has written songs recorded by Little Big Town, LeAnn Rimes, Jessica Simpson, Jim Brickman, SHeDAISY, Olivia Newton-John, Be Be Winans, Natalie Grant, Point of Grace, Marie Osmond, Wanessa Camargo, John Rich, Leonardo, Luiza Possi, The Wreckers, Chad Brock and Due West, and he has a lengthy list of film and television credits (including Tim Allen's Santa Clause 2, The Nativity Story and Letters To God). When he's not writing, Deere is devoted to helping other artists become major label recording successes such as SHeDAISY, Due West, Ryan Shupe & the Rubberband and Little Big Town.

Deere's career had quite a springboard in 1999 when the first act that he had extensively worked with (SHeDAISY) was signed to Disney's Lyric Street Records. Deere co-wrote five songs on their platinum debut album The Whole SHeBANG, including three top ten hits. He spent more than five years working with one of the most successful songwriters of our generation, Diane Warren, producing demo recordings on her songs. He has also produced music with American Idol Season 5 Winner Taylor Hicks, Wanessa Camargo, Marie Osmond, Olivia Newton-John, John Rich, Sisqó, David Archuleta, Ryan Shupe & The Rubberband (Hey Hey Hey, 2004 Pearl Award for Contemporary Album Of The Year) and Due West. With his remixing partner Silvio Richetto, Deere had a run of hit single remixes for artists like Jamey Johnson, Joe Nichols, Lady Antebellum and the best known being Trace Adkins’ Honky Tonk Badonkadonk.

His recent efforts include working with Marie Osmond to produce her 2016 album Music Is Medicine.

== Nashville Tribute Band ==
In 2005 Deere began a religious musical group called the Nashville Tribute Band with Dan Truman (of the country group Diamond Rio). With Deere as the lead songwriter, the band has recorded seven albums including their 2014 release Redeemer: A Nashville Tribute to Jesus Christ debuted in the top 10 on Billboard's Christian Chart.

Joining Dan are Brad Hull and Tim Gates (of the country group Due West) and Ben Truman and Chad Truman (also known as the Truman Brothers). The technical side of the band is shouldered by the talents of live engineer Aaron Kopp and Grammy Award Winner Silvio Richetto as mix engineer. To date, they have performed over 1,500 shows for audiences in the U.S., Canada, Australia, China and Great Britain.

Some of the featured singers on their seven albums include Diamond Rio, John Cowan, David Archuleta, Billy Dean, Alex Boye', Nathan Pacheco, Katherine Nelson, David Osmond, & Mindy Gledhill.

== Brazil ==
In 1999 Deere produced BMG's Brazilian Recording artist Wanessa Camargo’s self-titled debut album. The success of this album led to Deere producing six consecutive albums on Camargo. Deere also wrote many of her hits over the years including O Amor Não Deixa, Tanta Saudade, Gostar de Mim, Um Dia...Meu Primeiro Amor, and Sem Querer. Deere had more than 50 songs recorded in the Brazilian market and 9 hit singles with Camargo, Leonardo and Luiza Possi.

Educator In 2021 and 2022 Deere was contracted by Southern Virginia University to write curriculum for and to expand their Music Industry Concentration. Deere taught the new curriculum for the 2021 school year as a professor.

Publisher and Music Executive Deere opened Glass Box Music Group in 2003. Deere's first signing's were Matt Lopez and Brad Hull of the band Due West and Oklahoma native Luke Dick. Deere sold the company in 2007 to Texas businessman Steve Caperton. Deere remains the President of the non-profit 501(c)(3) the Nashville Tribute Band, Inc.
