= Lyric Street Records =

American country music record label

- Parent company: Disney Music Group
- Founded: 1997
- Founder: Randy Goodman
- Defunct: 2010
- Status: Defunct
- Genre: Country
- Country of origin: U.S.
- Location: Nashville, Tennessee

Lyric Street Records was an American record label. It was Disney Music Group's division for country music, founded in 1997 by Randy Goodman. The label had its first successes in 1998 with singles by Lari White and Aaron Tippin, both formerly of RCA Records. Other artists who recorded for the label included SHeDAISY and the label's most successful act, Rascal Flatts. A subsidiary label, Carolwood Records, existed between 2008 and 2009. Lyric Street Records was closed in 2010, with most of the former acts moving to other labels or exiting music entirely.

== History ==
President Randy Goodman, formerly a general manager for RCA Records, founded the original unnamed label in June 1997 as a division of Hollywood Records and started operations on August 1. Its first act was Lari White, who was formerly signed with RCA. Aaron Tippin, also then with RCA, and Violets, originally performing as the Osborne Sisters, were also in discussions about signing with the label as of December 1997. Goodman's plan for the company includes having no in-house producers and rely on Artists and repertoire division. Lyric Street Records was incorporated on May 19, 1998.

SHeDAISY signed with the label in 1999 followed by Rascal Flatts. Rascal Flatts debuted with Lyric Street in 2000 with the single "Prayin' for Daylight" and soon replaced SheDAISY as the company's flagship act. In December 2006, Lyric Street signed Bucky Covington, an American Idol finalist.

The label launched a subsidiary label, Carolwood Records, in October 2008. Jessica Andrews was the first artist signed to this subsidiary label, followed by Trent Tomlinson (who was formerly signed to Lyric Street proper) and Love and Theft. Carolwood was shuttered in November 2009, with most of its staff being transferred back to Lyric Street. Love and Theft, Ruby Summer, Trent Tomlinson, and The Parks were moved to Lyric Street.

On April 14, 2010, Disney Music Group announced the closure of the Lyric Street label. This announcement also stated that Bucky Covington, Kevin Fowler, Tyler Dickerson, and Rascal Flatts would be transferred to other branches of Disney Music Group. Buxton, Love and Theft, and The Parks were dropped altogether with the closure of Lyric. By August, Rascal Flatts had signed with Big Machine Records. In 2011, Love and Theft signed with RCA Nashville.

== Notable artists ==
- John Berry
- Sarah Buxton
- Bucky Covington
- Billy Ray Cyrus
- Kevin Denney
- Tyler Dickerson
- Kevin Fowler
- Ashley Gearing
- Josh Gracin
- Kerry Harvick
- Sonya Isaacs
- Kortney Kayle
- Love and Theft
- Marcel
- Brian McComas
- Rascal Flatts
- Rushlow
- Deric Ruttan
- Sawyer Brown
- SHeDAISY
- Phil Stacey
- Aaron Tippin
- Trent Tomlinson
- Chuck Wagon and the Wheels
- Lari White

=== Artists on Carolwood ===
- Jessica Andrews
- Love and Theft
- Trent Tomlinson

== See also ==
- List of record labels
