= McBride & the Ride discography =

- Studio albums: 5
- Compilation albums: 1
- Singles: 17
- Music videos: 10

American country music band McBride & the Ride has released five studio albums, one compilation album, and 17 singles. The band charted 12 times on Billboard Hot Country Songs between 1991 and 2002. Their highest peak is "Sacred Ground", which went to number two in 1992. It is the title track from their second album Sacred Ground, which has been certified gold by the Recording Industry Association of America (RIAA).

== Albums ==
=== Studio albums ===
Title	Album details	Peak chart positions				Certifications (sales threshold)
Title	Album details	US Country	US	US Heat	CAN Country	Certifications (sales threshold)
Burnin' Up the Road	Release date: August 10, 1990; Label: MCA Records	27	180	—	—	
Sacred Ground	Release date: April 28, 1992; Label: MCA Records	27	144	3	15	US: Gold
Hurry Sundown	Release date: April 27, 1993; Label: MCA Records	53	—	17	—	
Terry McBride & the Ride	Release date: September 13, 1994; Label: MCA Records	53	—	17	—	
Amarillo Sky	Release date: May 21, 2002; Label: Dualtone Records	—	—	—	—	
"—" denotes releases that did not chart

=== Compilation albums ===
Title	Album details
Country's Best	Release date: October 8, 1996; Label: Universal Special Products

== Singles ==
Year	Single	Peak positions		Album
Year	Single	US Country	CAN Country	Album
1990	"Felicia"	—	74	Burnin' Up the Road
1990	"Every Step of the Way"	— (Note: "Every Step of the Way" did not chart on Hot Country Songs, but peaked at No. 5 on Hot Country Radio Breakouts.)	—	Burnin' Up the Road
1991	"Can I Count On You"	15	9	Burnin' Up the Road
1991	"Same Old Star"	28	16	Burnin' Up the Road
1992	"Sacred Ground"	2	2	Sacred Ground
1992	"Going Out of My Mind"	5	11	Sacred Ground
1992	"Just One Night"	5	6	Sacred Ground
1993	"Love on the Loose, Heart on the Run"	3	8	Hurry Sundown
1993	"Hurry Sundown"	17	8	Hurry Sundown
1994	"No More Cryin'"	26	23	8 Seconds
1994	"Been There"	45	45	Terry McBride & the Ride (as Terry McBride & the Ride)
1994	"High Hopes and Empty Pockets"	72	—	Terry McBride & the Ride (as Terry McBride & the Ride)
1995	"Somebody Will"	57	71	Terry McBride & the Ride (as Terry McBride & the Ride)
2002	"Anything That Touches You"	50	—	Amarillo Sky
2002	"Squeeze Box"	—	—	Amarillo Sky
2002	"Amarillo Sky"	—	—	Amarillo Sky
2022	"Marlboros & Avon"	—	—	Along Comes a Girl
2023	"Along Comes a Girl"	—	—	Along Comes a Girl
"—" denotes releases that did not chart

== Music videos ==
Year	Single	Director
1990	"Every Step of the Way"	Jerry Simer
1991	"Can I Count on You"	Bill Young
1991	"Same Old Star"	Bill Young
1992	"Sacred Ground"	Bill Young
1992	"Going Out of My Mind"	Sherman Halsey
1992	"Just One Night"	Tom Grubbs
1993	"Hurry Sundown"	Wayne Miller
1994	"No More Cryin'"	Charley Randazzo
1994	"Been There"	Joanne Gardner
1994	"High Hopes and Empty Pockets"	Sherman Halsey
