= List of songs written by Kostas =

This is an alphabetical list of songs written or co-written by the American songwriter Kostas that have been commercially released. According to BMI, he has written or co-written over 800 songs, many remain unrecorded.

Song (date), Writers - Artist

== A ==
- A Little Bit Of Love (Goes A Long, Long Way) (1992), Kostas/Marty Stuart - Wynonna Judd
- Ain't Found Nobody (1994), Harlan Howard/Kostas - The Mavericks
- Ain't That Lonely Yet (1993), Kostas/James House - Dwight Yoakam
- Ain't That Love (1996) - Kenny Chesney

== B ==
- Baby It's You (1994), Dave Goodwin/Howard/Kostas - Hank Flamingo
- Baby Take a Piece of My Heart (1991), Kostas/Kelly Willis - Kelly Willis
- Ball and Chain (1980) - Kostas Lazarides
- Because You Love Me (1998), Kostas/John Scott Sherrill - Jo Dee Messina
- Blame It on Your Heart (1993), Howard/Kostas - Patty Loveless

== C ==
- Call Me (1995) - Candye Kane
- Can't Stop Myself from Loving You (1991) - Patty Loveless
- Child With no Home (1980) - Kostas Lazarides

== D ==
- Don't Leave Her Lonely Too Long (1989), Kostas/Marty Stuart - Marty Stuart
- Don't Need That Heartache (1995), Kostas/Melba Montgomery - Tracy Byrd
- Don't Start a Fire (If You Can't Put It Out) (1997), Dean Folkvord/Kostas - Kostas
- Don't Threaten Me with a Good Time (1996), Bobby Boyd/Kostas/Don Mealer - Billy Dean
- Down on the River (1990), Kostas/Wayland Patton - Neal McCoy
- Dream River (1998), Kostas/Raul Malo - The Mavericks

== E ==
- Everything About You (1991), Harry Stinson/Kostas - George Fox

== F ==
- Feelings of Love (1990) - Patty Loveless
- Feels Like Mississippi (1997), Pete Anderson/Kostas - Pete Anderson
- Fools Like Me (1991), Hal Ketchum/Kostas - Trisha Yearwood
- Full Deck of Cards (1996), Kostas/Melanie Dyer - Rick Trevino

== G ==
- Geisha Girl (1980) - Kostas Lazarides
- Girls go fishin’ - co-written by Kostas Lazarides and Neil Diamond
- Going Out of My Mind (1992), Kostas/Terry McBride - McBride & the Ride
- Good Mornin' Memory (1994), Kostas/Greg Lucas - Kostas

== H ==
- Half a Heart (1991), Kostas/Marty Stuart - Marty Stuart
- Happiness (2005) - Lee Ann Womack
- Harbor for a Lonely Heart (1991), Kostas/Jenny Yates - Sammy Kershaw
- Heart Full of Love - Holly Dunn
- Heart of Stone (1995), Dwight Yoakam/Kostas - Dwight Yoakam
- The Heart That Love Forgot (1991), Kostas/Mas Palermo - Kelly Willis
- Heartaches and Dreams (1997), George Ducas/Kostas - George Ducas
- Here Comes Temptation (1993) - Trisha Yearwood
- Here Comes the Rain - The Mavericks
- High on Love - Patty Loveless
- Honky Tonk Girls (1999) - Hank Williams III

== I ==
- I Can Love You Better (1997) - The Chicks
- I Come and Go (1980) - Kostas Lazarides
- I Don't Believe That's How You Feel (1996), Kostas/Harlan Howard - Tracy Byrd
- I Never Saw Paris (1994), John Scott Sherrill/Kostas - Kostas Lazarides
- I Want a Woman (1991), Kostas/Marty Stuart - Marty Stuart
- I'll Just Pretend (1996), Richard Bennett/Kostas - Mandy Barnett
- I'm Goin' Up (1997), Kostas/Wally Wilson - Claire Lynch
- I'm Still Falling (2003) - Slow Horses
- If You Only Knew (1995), Kostas/Raul Malo - The Mavericks
- If You Think (1988) - Patty Loveless
- In His World (1990) - Kostas/Leigh Reynolds - Emmylou Harris
- In My Eyes (2014) - Kostas - The Cox Family
- Is It Love Yet (1997) - Kostas/Chely Wright - Chely Wright
- It Only Hurts When I Laugh (1994) Kostas/Marty Stuart - Rick Trevino
- It's About Me (1997) - John Bettis/Kostas - Joy Lynn White

== J ==
- Jane (1966) - Kostas Lazarides
- Just a Memory (1994), Kostas/Raul Malo - The Mavericks

== K ==
- King of Fools (1993), Dwight Yoakam/Kostas - Dwight Yoakam

== L ==
- Language of Love (1995), Bobby Carmichael/Kostas - Lisa Brokop
- Lies Like Hell (2014), Bobby Boyd/Kostas - Point Blank
- Life #9 (1993), Kostas/Tony Perez - Martina McBride
- A Little Bit of Love (Goes a Long, Long Way) (1992), Kostas/Marty Stuart - Wynonna
- The Lonely Side of Love (1988) - Patty Loveless
- Looking in the Eyes of Love (1990), Kostas/Tricia Walker - Patty Loveless
- Lord Have Mercy on the Working Man (1992) - Travis Tritt
- Love Can Die (1980) - Kostas Lazarides
- Love Don't Care (1999), Kostas/Anders Osborne - Anders Osborne
- Love Fever (2001), Kevin Bowe/Kostas - Ana Popović
- Love on the Loose, Heart on the Run (1993), Kostas/Anna Lisa Graham - McBride & the Ride

== M ==
- Mind Over Matter (1995), Kostas/Wally Wilson - Stacy Dean Campbell
- More Of Your Love (2001), Kostas/Wally Wilson - The Derailers

== N ==
- Neon Blue (1994), Pete Anderson/Kostas - The Mavericks
- Next Time I Fall in Love (2007), Kostas/Trent Summar/John Bohlinger - Ashley Ray
- No Rainbows (1980) - Kostas Lazarides
- Nobody Loves You Like I Do (1991) - Patty Loveless
- Nothin' But Good (1994), Kostas/William Soule Robinson - Dawn Sears
- Nothing (1995), Dwight Yoakam/Kostas - Dwight Yoakam
- Nothing's Changed Here (1990), Dwight Yoakam/Kostas - Dwight Yoakam
- Now That's All Right with Me, Kostas/Tony Perez - (1996) Mandy Barnett, (2008) Jypsi, (1996) Chris LeDoux

== O ==
- On Down the Line (1990) - Patty Loveless
- Out of Control Raging Fire - Patty Loveless with Travis Tritt
- On the 7th Day (2003) - Etta James
- One of You (1999) (Kostas, Jim Lauderdale) - George Strait on the Always Never the Same album.
- The One That Got Away (Got Away With My Heart) (1998) - Allison Moorer
- One Way Rider (1995), Kostas/Kevin Welch - Kevin Welch
- Overtime (1990) - Patty Loveless

== P ==
- Pizziricco (1999), Kostas/Raul Malo - The Mavericks
- Pretend (1994), Kostas/Raul Malo - The Mavericks

== R ==
- The Richest Fool Alive (2001), Bobby Boyd/Kostas/Donald Mealer - Patty Loveless
- Ridin' the Rodeo (1991) – Vince Gill, (1995) - Perfect Stranger
- Ring (2005) - Gary Allan
- Rainy Days (1996) - Mandy Barnett - Kostas/Pamela Brown Hayes

== S ==
- Send a Message to My Heart - Dwight Yoakam with Patty Loveless
- She Ain't My Baby Anymore - "Kostas/John Bohlinger (musician)" - Kostas
- She's So Lonely (1996), Kostas/Dean Miller - Scott Joss
- Shelter from the Storm (1996), Kostas/Marty Stuart - Marty Stuart
- Slave to the Habit (1999) - Kostas/Toby Keith/Chuck Cannon – Shane Minor
- Souvenirs (1996), Kostas/Kevin Welch - Scott Joss
- Starlight (1980) - Kostas Lazarides
- Sweet Miss Behavin' (1994), Kostas/Wally Wilson - Collin Raye

== T ==
- Tenderly So (1980) - Kostas Lazarides
- That Something In My Life (1997), Clint Black/Kostas - Clint Black
- That's All Right With Me (1993), Kostas/Tony Perez - Ronna Reeves Craig Sizemore (2001)
- That's What I'm Gonna Do (1994), Jodie Decker, Kostas - Kostas Lazarides
- There Goes My Heart (1994), Kostas/Malo - The Mavericks
- This Time (1993), Yoakam/Kostas - Dwight Yoakam
- Timber, I'm Falling in Love (1988) - Patty Loveless
- True Confessions (1992), Kostas/Marty Stuart - Joy Lynn White
- Try Not to Look So Pretty (1993), Yoakam/Kostas - Dwight Yoakam
- Turn It On, Turn It Up, Turn Me Loose (1990), Kostas/Patton - Dwight Yoakam
- Two Doors Down (1993), Yoakam/Kostas - Dwight Yoakam
- Two Timin' Two Stepper (1993), Bobby Boyd/Kostas - Conway Twitty

== W ==
- Walkin' In The Sunshine (1999), Jeff Hanna/Kostas - Farmer's Daughter
- What a Crying Shame (1994), Kostas/Raul Malo - The Mavericks
- What Did Love Ever Do To You (1999), Dean Miller/Kostas - Hank Williams III
- What We Do (1980) - Kostas Lazarides
- Who's Gonna Pay for This Broken Heart (1996), Kostas/Lee Roy Parnell - The Cox Family
- Would You Believe Me If I Lied (1997), Kostas/Billy Yates - Billy Yates

== Y ==
- You and Only You (1998), Kostas/Wally Wilson - Mila Mason
- You Beat All I've Ever Seen (1996), Kostas/Kathy Louvin/Melba Montgomery - Rhonda Vincent
- You Can't Stop Love (1996) - Marty Stuart
- Young Hearts Rockin' to a Country Beat (1997), Kostas/Tim Ryan Rouillier - Dallas County Line
- Your Tattoo (1995), Kostas/Jack Tempchin - Sammy Kershaw
