= Amarillo Sky =

Amarillo Sky may refer to:

- Amarillo Sky (album), a 2002 album by American country music trio McBride & the Ride
- "Amarillo Sky" (song), the album's title track, a song later recorded by Jason Aldean in 2006 and released as a single
