= Hurry Sundown =

Hurry Sundown may refer to:

- Hurry Sundown, a 1964 novel by K.B. Gilden
  - Hurry Sundown (film), a 1967 film directed by Otto Preminger, based on the novel
- "Hurry Sundown" (Peter, Paul and Mary song), a 1966 song by Earl Robinson and Yip Harburg
- Hurry Sundown (McBride & the Ride album)
  - "Hurry Sundown" (McBride & the Ride song), the title track from the album
- Hurry Sundown (Outlaws album), or the title track
