= Bill Carter (musician) =

American singer-songwriter

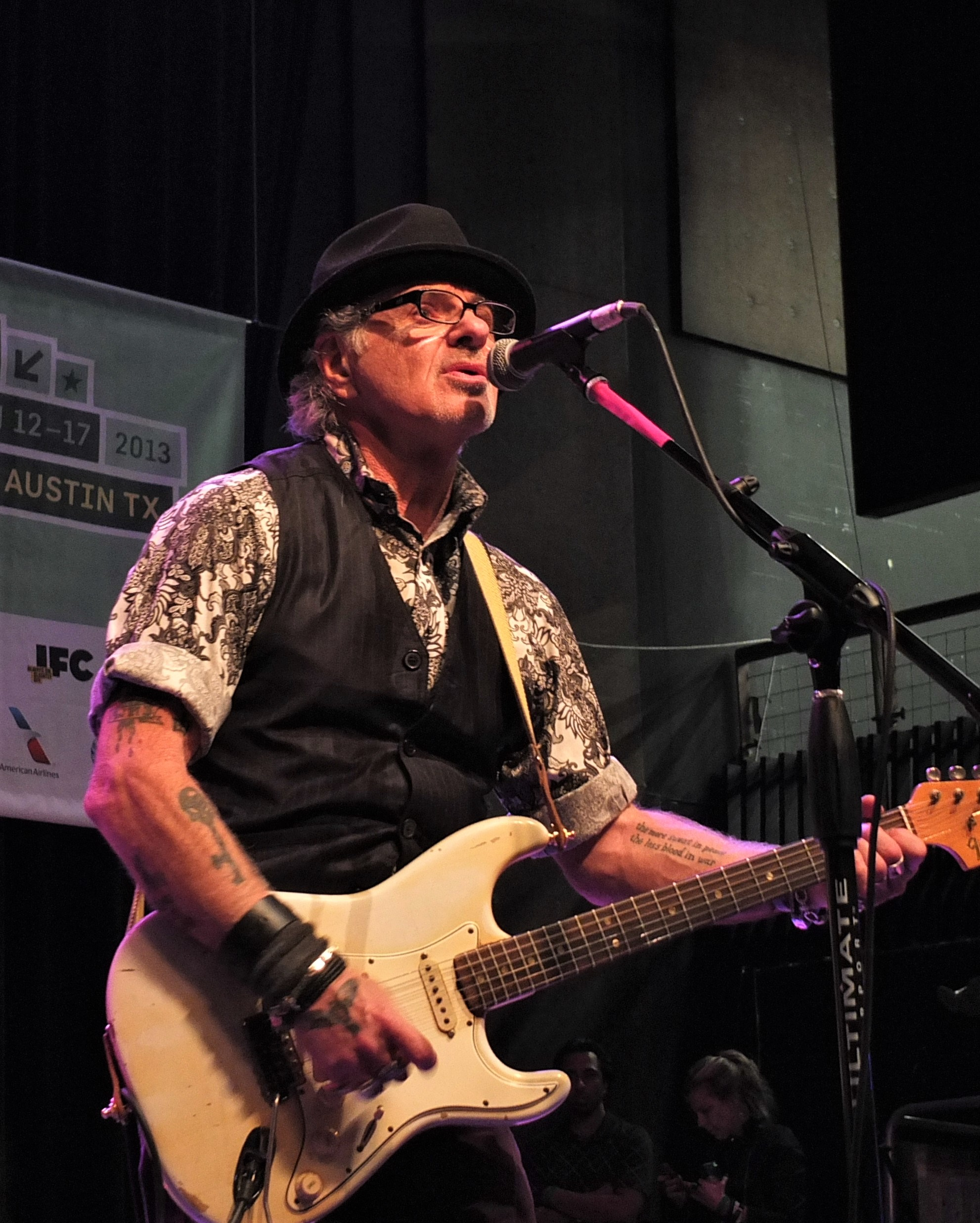
- Bill Carter - Austin Music Awards (2013)

Background information
- Also known as: Bill Carter & The Blame
- Genres: Blues rock; Texas Blues; Alternative country; Country; Folk
- Occupations: Musician; Songwriter; Singer
- Instruments: Guitar; Bass; Harmonica
- Years active: 1976-present
- Label: Forty Below Records
- Website: www.billcarterandtheblame.com

Bill Carter is an American singer, songwriter, musician, and member of the Austin Music Hall of Fame. He is best known for co-writing "Crossfire" and "Willie The Wimp", recorded by Stevie Ray Vaughan; "Why Get Up?", recorded by The Fabulous Thunderbirds; and "Jacksboro Highway", recorded by John Mayall. Carter's songs have been covered by other blues, country, and rock artists including Waylon Jennings, Robert Palmer, Ruth Brown, Stray Cats, and Counting Crows.

== Family ==
Bill Carter was born to Cash Carter, a US Navy Boatswains Mate and Francis Infantino, an Italian-American from Brooklyn. Though Carter was raised in Washington State where his father was stationed, his family roots trace back to Kentucky. Carter's paternal grandfather William Henry Carter is the first cousin of A.P. Carter, musician and founding member of The Carter Family.

== Career ==
=== Early career ===
In 1976, Carter moved to Austin, Texas to pursue his music career. He soon met a University of Texas student from Oklahoma named Ruth Ellsworth while performing at the Inner Sanctum record store. Ellsworth would become his wife and writing partner.

After hearing the Texas blues band The Fabulous Thunderbirds were heading into the studio, Carter and Ellsworth deliberately wrote songs to present to the band. One of these songs, "Why Get Up?" made it onto the album that would become Tuff Enuff. The couple was struggling financially to the point they were nearly evicted from their house just before General Mill's purchased the rights to use the song in a breakfast cereal commercial.

Carter's solo record Stompin' Grounds was released in 1985 and featured Jimmie Vaughan on lead guitar. The song "Willie the Wimp" was inspired by an article Carter read in the Austin American-Statesman about the decadent funeral of Chicago pimp and drug dealer William "Wimp" Stokes Jr., complete with Stokes propped upright in a Cadillac shaped coffin with diamond rings on his fingers and $100 bills in his hands. "'We were reading the Austin American-Statesman over breakfast one morning, and your column about Willie the Wimp was in it,'" Carter recalled to journalist Bob Greene. "'I said to Ruth, 'This isn`t a column-it's a song. We drove to the studio, and in the two miles it took us to get there we put the column to music. Stevie's brother Jimmie was at the studio, and he called Stevie and told him about it. Stevie just loved that song. He performed it on stages all over the world. The audiences knew every word-and they would sing along with Stevie. Stevie would have this evil grin on his face as he sang it.'" A live recording of the song appeared the following year on the album Live Alive by Stevie Ray Vaughan and Double Trouble.

Carter, Ellsworth, and Stevie Ray Vaughan's bandmates Chris Layton, Tommy Shannon, and Reese Wynans came up with "Crossfire" while jamming together at Double Trouble's rehearsal space. The song was recorded for In Step, the fourth studio album by Stevie Ray Vaughan and Double Trouble. The album went on to win a Grammy for Best Contemporary Blues Album in 1989, and "Crossfire" won Song of the Year at the Austin Music Awards. In 2007, the writers of "Crossfire" were honored by BMI for more than one million aired performances of the song.

Sony Music released and later shelved Carter's 1988 solo album Loaded Dice. The album was produced by Chuck Leavell and featured Stevie and Jimmie Vaughan on guitars. The song, "Na Na Ne Na Nay" was re-released on Stevie Ray Vaughan's posthumous Solos, Sessions & Encores album, a compilation of recordings where Vaughan was either a guest or a sideman.

=== P ===
Between 1993 and 1995, Carter was a member of the alternative rock band P, born out of a friendship between Carter, actor Johnny Depp, and Butthole Surfers frontman Gibby Haynes. The band performed at the Austin Music Awards and released a record on Capitol Records that featured contributions from Red Hot Chili Peppers bassist Flea and Sex Pistols guitarist Steve Jones. The song "Michael Stipe" received airplay on alternative rock radio.

=== West of Memphis: Voices For Justice ===
Bill and Ruth E. Carter began corresponding with the West Memphis Three's Damien Echols after seeing the Paradise Lost documentary film. Echols' wife Lorri Davis brought the Carters a gift of three paper roses made by Damien in prison and representing each of the West Memphis Three. In return, they wrote "Anything Made of Paper" for Echols, its title alluding to the fact, as a death row inmate, Echols could only send and receive gifts made of paper. The song was recorded with Johnny Depp on guitar for the soundtrack to West of Memphis, the documentary film written and directed by Amy Berg and produced by Peter Jackson and Fran Walsh. Carter performed the song, backed by a band that included Depp, on the Late Show with David Letterman in early 2013. At the same show Carter said that they recorded also a cover of the song "Road to Nowhere" together, which was released as a bonus track on the same album.

=== Present ===
Carter performs off-and-on with a group of veteran Austin musicians that became known as The Blame. The group has at different times featured guitarists Charlie Sexton, Will Sexton, Denny Freeman, and David Lee Holt; drummers Chris Layton and Dony Wynn; keyboardist Mike Thompson; and bassist Andy Salmon.

In 2016, Carter released his ninth solo album, Innocent Victims & Evil Companions through Forty Below Records. Writing for AllMusic, Stephen Thomas Erlewine characterized the album as a combination of two aesthetics, muscular roots-rock and dusty Americana poetry. "...the most impressive thing about Innocent Victims & Evil Companions is how Carter threads all these sounds and sensibilities to create something that's distinctively Texan and humanly idiosyncratic."

Carter toured the following two years in support of Innocent Victims & Evil Companions and opened shows around the US and Canada for English blues musician and label mate John Mayall.

On his 2017 album, Bill Carter, Carter recorded solo acoustic versions of his best known songs that were covered by other artists. Peter Blackstock wrote in the Austin American-Statesman, "The arrangements mostly are stripped down to basics of acoustic guitar and vocals, with occasional accents of rhythm and harmonica. That puts the spotlight squarely on the songwriting, and the results are a compelling reminder that Carter is one of the best American-roots tunesmiths Austin has ever produced."

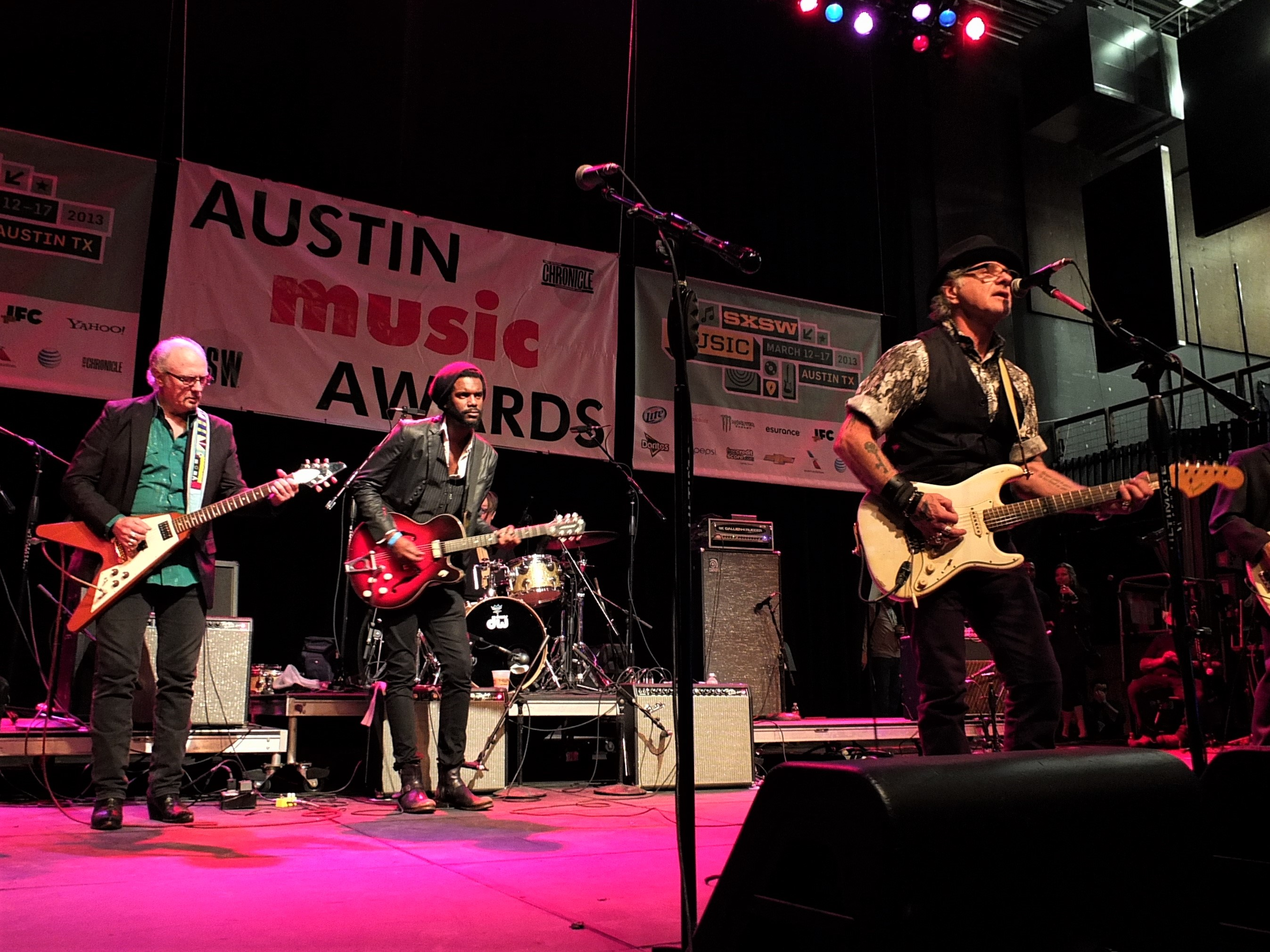
Bill Carter at Austin Music Awards (2013) with Denny Freeman and Gary Clark Jr.

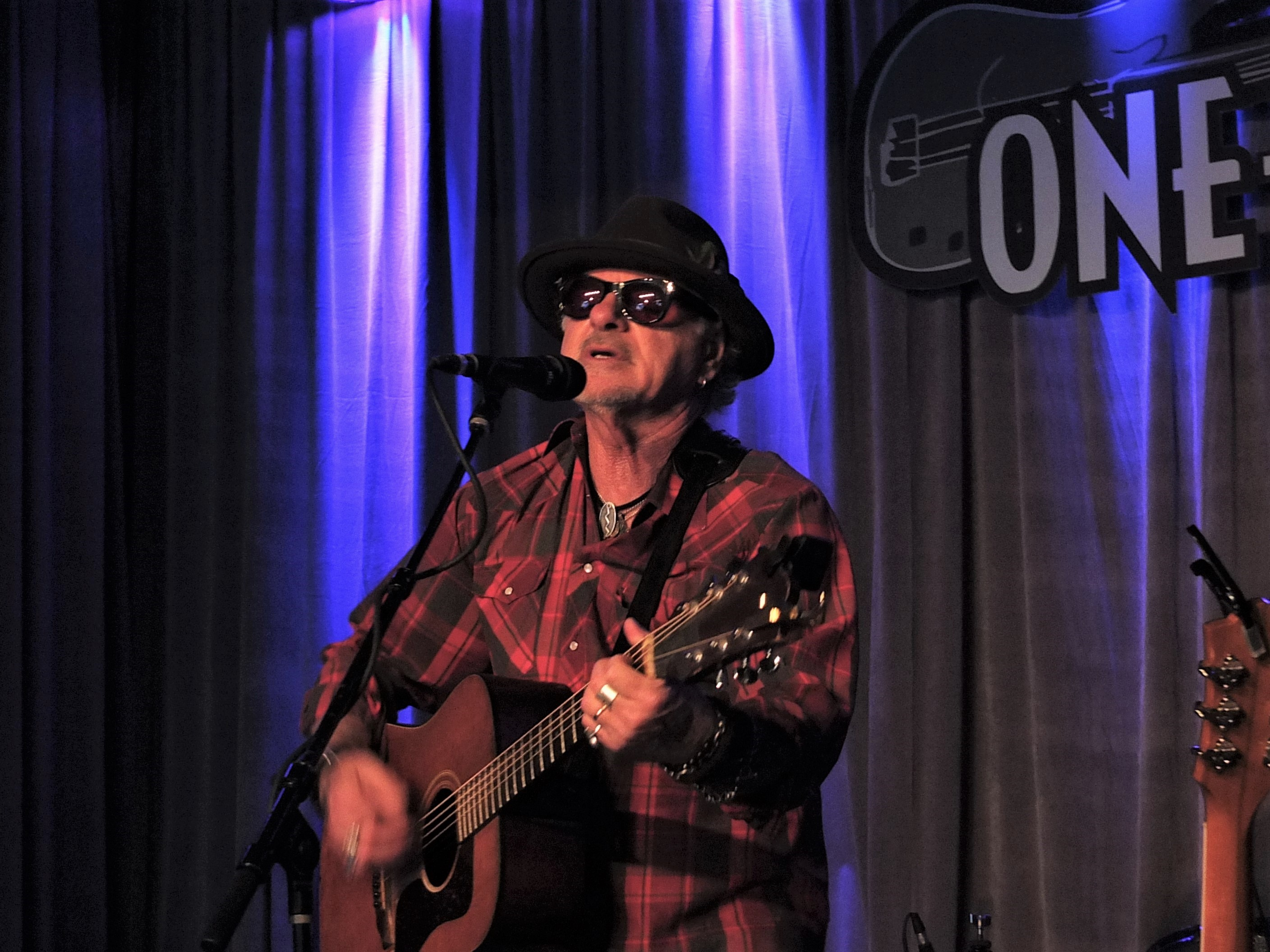
Bill Carter at One-2-One Bar in Austin, TX (2013)

== Artistry ==
Carter cites Bob Dylan, The Beatles, and songwriter Ron Davies as early influences.

== Discography ==
=== As a solo artist ===
- (1985) Stompin' Grounds (Crosscut Records)
- (1988) Loaded Dice (Sony)
- (1994) City of the Violet Crown
- (2011) Behind the Barn
- (2013) Unknown
- (2013) "Anything Made of Paper" West of Memphis Motion Picture Soundtrack
- (2016) Innocent Victims & Evil Companions (Forty Below Records)
- (2017) Bill Carter (Forty Below Records)

=== As a band member ===
- (1995) P by P (Captol Records)
- (2010) Carter Doster Sexton by Carter Doster Sexton

=== As a songwriter ===
Title	Composers	Performer	Album	Year
"Why Get Up?"	Bill Carter, Ruth Ellsworth	The Fabulous Thunderbirds	Tuff Enuff	1986
"Why Get Up?"	Bill Carter, Ruth Ellsworth	Robert Palmer	Drive	2003
"Why Get Up?"	Bill Carter, Ruth Ellsworth	Ronnie McDowell	When a Man Loves a Woman	1992
"Why Get Up?"	Bill Carter, Ruth Ellsworth	Don Williams	One Good Well	1989
"Willie The Wimp"	Bill Carter, Ruth Ellsworth	Stevie Ray Vaughan & Double Trouble	Live Alive	1986
"Willie The Wimp"	Bill Carter, Ruth Ellsworth	Stevie Ray Vaughan & Double Trouble	From Dusk Till Dawn Motion Picture Soundtrack	1996
"Willie The Wimp"	Bill Carter, Ruth Ellsworth	Stevie Ray Vaughan & Double Trouble	San Antonio Rose	2016
"Crossfire"	Bill Carter, Ruth Ellsworth, Chris Layton, Tommy Shannon, Reese Wynans	Stevie Ray Vaughan & Double Trouble	In Step	1989
"Crossfire"	Bill Carter, Ruth Ellsworth, Chris Layton, Tommy Shannon, Reese Wynans	Stevie Ray Vaughan & Double Trouble	The Fire Meets The Fury: The Radio Broadcasts 1989	2012
"Na-Na-Ne-Na-Ney"	Bill Carter	Bill Carter and Stevie Ray Vaughan	Solos, Sessions & Encores	2007
"Jacksboro Highway"	Bill Carter, Ruth Ellsworth, Gary Nicholson, Wally Wilson	John Mayall's Bluesbreakers	A Sense of Place	1990
"Jacksboro Highway"	Bill Carter, Ruth Ellsworth, Gary Nicholson, Wally Wilson	John Mayall	70th Birthday Concert	2003
"Jacksboro Highway"	Bill Carter, Ruth Ellsworth, Gary Nicholson, Wally Wilson	Waylon Jennings, Rob Roy Parnell	Jacksboro Highway	1999
"Richest Man" also "Richest One"	Bill Carter	Counting Crows		
"Richest Man" also "Richest One"	Bill Carter	Ruth Brown	A Good Day for the Blues	1999
"Richest Man" also "Richest One"	Bill Carter	C.J. Chenier	Too Much Fun	1995
"Richest Man" also "Richest One"	Bill Carter	Toni Price	Swim Away	1993
"Richest Man" also "Richest One"	Bill Carter	Jennifer Goree	Jennifer Goree	1996
"Richest Man" also "Richest One"	Bill Carter	Joanne Redding	Running Kind	2000
"Richest Man" also "Richest One"	Bill Carter	Texas Tornados	A Little Bit Is Better Than Nada	2015
"Lust 'N' Love"	Bill Carter, Ruth Ellsworth, Brian Setzer	Stray Cats	Choo Choo Hot Fish	1992
"One Rock at a Time"	Bill Carter, Ruth Ellsworth, Chris Layton, Gary Nicholson	The Nighthawks	Trouble	1991
"One Rock at a Time"	Bill Carter, Ruth Ellsworth, Chris Layton, Gary Nicholson	Storyville	Bluest Eyes	1994
"Trick Rider"	Bill Carter, Terry McBride	McBride & The Ride	Sacred Ground	1992
"Can I Count on You"	Bill Carter, Ruth Ellsworth, Terry McBride	McBride & The Ride	Burnin' up the Road	1990
"Burnin' up the Road"	Bill Carter, Ruth Ellsworth, Terry McBride	McBride & The Ride	Burnin' up the Road	1990
"Burnin' up the Road"	Bill Carter, Ruth Ellsworth, Terry McBride	John Anderson	8 Seconds Motion Picture Soundtrack	1994
"Every Step of the Way"	Bill Carter, Ruth Ellsworth, Terry McBride	McBride & The Ride	Burnin' up the Road	1990
"Every Step of the Way"	Bill Carter, Ruth Ellsworth, Terry McBride	The Oak Ridge Boys	Double Barrel Country	1999
"Pushin' Fire"	Bill Carter, Omar Dykes	Omar & The Howlers	Courts of Lulu	1992
"Jumpin' the Gun"	Bill Carter, Omar Dykes	Omar & The Howlers	Courts of Lulu	1992
"Life Is Just a Circle"	Bill Carter, Omar Dykes	Omar & The Howlers	Muddy Springs Road	1995
"Red River"	Bill Carter, Ruth Ellsworth, Omar Dykes	Omar & The Howlers	World Wide Open	1996
"Enough is Enough"	Bill Carter, Ruth Ellsworth, Omar Dykes	Omar & The Howlers	World Wide Open	1996
"A Train Runnin'"	Bill Carter, Ruth Ellsworth, Christine Albert	Christine Albert	Underneath the Lone Star Sky	1995
"The Right Place"	Bill Carter, Ruth Ellsworth, Tony Villanueva	The Derailers	Full Western Dress	1999
"Someone Else's Problem"	Bill Carter	The Derailers	Full Western Dress	1999
"Longing"	Bill Carter, Ruth Ellsworth, Brian Hofeldt	The Derailers	Full Western Dress	1999
"I Wouldn't Dare"	Bill Carter, Ruth Ellsworth	Vanessa Paradis	Best of Vanessa Paradis	2009
