= Sacred Ground (disambiguation) =

Sacred Ground may refer to:

- A sacred site, an area considered sacred or holy

== Music ==
- Sacred Ground (David Murray album), or the title song, 2007
- Sacred Ground (McBride & the Ride album), or the title song (see below), 1992
- Sacred Ground (Sweet Honey in the Rock album), 1995
- Sacred Ground (Whit Dickey album), 2006
- Sacred Ground: A Tribute to Mother Earth, a 2005 compilation album of Native American music
- "Sacred Ground" (song), a 1989 song by Kix Brooks, also covered by McBride & the Ride

== Other media ==
- Sacred Ground (film), a 1983 American Western starring Tim McIntire and Jack Elam
- Sacred Ground (novel), a 1995 novel by Mercedes Lackey
- "Sacred Ground" (Star Trek: Voyager), a 1996 episode of Star Trek: Voyager
