= New to This Town (song) =

Single by Kix Brooks featuring Joe Walsh

from the album New to This Town
- Released: March 19, 2012
- Genre: Country
- Length: 4:20
- Label: Arista Nashville
- Songwriters: Kix Brooks, Marv Green, Terry McBride
- Producers: Kix Brooks, Jay DeMarcus

Kix Brooks singles chronology
"She Does the Walk on By" (1989)	"New to This Town" (2012)	"Bring It On Home" (2012)

Joe Walsh singles chronology
"Wings" (2012)	"New to This Town" (2012)	"Analog Man" (2012)

"New to This Town" is a song co-written and recorded by American country music artist Kix Brooks. It was released in March 2012 as the first single and title track from his album of the same name, the first album released by Brooks after his departure from Brooks & Dunn. It is his first solo chart entry since "Sacred Ground" in 1989. Brooks wrote this song with Terry McBride and Marv Green.

== Content ==
The song is a mid-tempo where the narrator wishes that he were "new to this town" so that he would not have to deal with memories of a former lover. Co-writer Marv Green said that he was inspired to write the song after seeing a U-Haul truck at a café, and thinking about what it would be like to be new to a town. It features Joe Walsh on slide guitar.

== Critical reception ==
Karlie Justus Marlowe of Engine 145 gave the song a "thumbs up", saying that it was an "original take on the small town love narrative", while comparing Brooks' voice to David Nail.

== Music video ==
According to Taste of Country, "the singer happens upon a variety of circumstances, which then take place in reverse."

== Chart performance ==
Chart (2012)	Peak position
US Hot Country Songs (Billboard)	31
