= Kix Brooks (album) =

Studio album by Kix Brooks
- Released: 1989 (LP); 1993 (CD)
- Genre: Country
- Length: 37:02
- Label: Capitol Nashville, Liberty
- Producer: Rafe Van Hoy, Kix Brooks

Kix Brooks chronology
Kix Brooks (1989)	New to This Town (2012)

Alternative cover
- Liberty Records reissue

Professional ratings
Review scores
Source	Rating
AllMusic	3/5 stars

Kix Brooks is the self-titled debut solo studio album by American country music artist Kix Brooks. It was released on Capitol Nashville in 1989, a year before he joined Ronnie Dunn to form the duo Brooks & Dunn. The album was re-released in 1993 on compact disc via Liberty Records. It includes the single "Sacred Ground," which was a minor hits for Brooks on the country charts, and a new version of "Baby, When Your Heart Breaks Down", which was originally released as a single in 1983.

"Sacred Ground" was later covered by McBride & the Ride on their 1992 album Sacred Ground. McBride & the Ride's version peaked at #2 on the Billboard Hot Country Singles & Tracks (now Hot Country Songs) charts.

== Track listing ==
1. "Highways and Heartaches" (Kix Brooks, Chris Waters) - 4:05
2. "Way Up North Around Shreveport" (Brooks, Don Cook) - 2:45
3. "There's a Telephone Ringing" (Brooks, Alan Laney, Kyle Young) - 4:11
4. "She Does the Walk On By" (Brooks, Gary Nicholson) - 3:02
5. "The River" (Brooks, Russell Smith) - 3:13
6. "Baby, When Your Heart Breaks Down" (Brooks) - 3:02
7. "The Story of My Life" (Brooks, Roger Murrah) - 4:02
8. "Sacred Ground" (Brooks, Vernon Rust) - 2:51
9. "A Little Magic on My Mind" (Brooks, Lewis Anderson) - 3:07
10. "I'm On to You" (Brooks, Waters, Tom Shapiro) - 3:24
11. "The Last Rodeo" (Brooks, Wally Wilson) - 3:19

== Personnel ==
- Kix Brooks - lead vocals, background vocals
- Sam Bush - mandolin
- Pat Jacobs - drums
- Terry McMillan - harmonica, percussion
- Edgar Meyer - bowed bass
- Danny Milliner - bass guitar, background vocals
- Matt Rollings - accordion
- Brent Rowan - acoustic guitar, electric guitar
- Dan Seals - background vocals
- Hassell Teekell - piano, keyboards, Hammond B-3 organ
- Dennis Wilson - background vocals
- Wally Wilson - piano
