= Flukey Stokes =

American drug kingpin from Chicago, Illinois

- Photograph of Stokes attending his 30th wedding anniversary party (January 28, 1985).
- Born: William Morris Stokes; December 12, 1937; Chicago, Illinois, U.S.
- Died: November 19, 1986 (aged 48); Chicago, Illinois, U.S.
- Cause of death: Murder (gunshot wounds; mouth and chest)
- Resting place: Oak Woods Cemetery (Chicago, Illinois)
- Occupation: Drug Kingpin
- Children: 1
- Status: a) Completed sentence b) Died before completion
- Convictions: a) 1979 narcotics conviction b) 1985 bribery conviction
- Penalty: a) 18 months' incarceration b) 36 months' probation

William Morris "Flukey" Stokes (December 12, 1937 – November 19, 1986) was an American reputed mobster from Chicago, Illinois. Stokes was from the South Side and well known for his silk suits, diamond rings, and flamboyant lifestyle as a drug trafficking kingpin and pool hall owner. Stokes immortalized himself in Chicago by throwing a US$200,000 party on his 30th wedding anniversary in 1985 and for the decadent funeral he arranged for his murdered 28-year-old son, Willie "the Wimp" Stokes, Jr. in February 1984. The elder Stokes had his son buried in a Cadillac-style coffin with $100 bills stuffed between his diamond ring-laden fingers. Two years later in November 1986, Flukey would also be murdered, along with his chauffeur, sitting inside a 1986 Cadillac limousine while talking on his wireless telephone. Stokes was 48 years old.

== Cadillac coffin ==
Willie Stokes garnered international notoriety for the arrangements he made for his son Willie the Wimp's funeral. The younger Stokes followed his father's example trafficking narcotics and rivaled his dad's appetite for gambling. Flukey said of his son, "[he was] a fine young man; he was very well liked and did a lot of gambling." Willie the Wimp was buried in a custom-designed casket made to resemble a Cadillac Seville. At his viewing he was propped up in the coffin with his hands on the steering wheel. The casket had functioning headlights and taillights that blinked, whitewall tires, a windshield and a vanity license plate that read "Wimp", Stokes' nickname. He wore "a flaming red suit, a jaunty gray hat and diamond rings. Several $100 bills stuck out from between his fingers."

== "Willie the Wimp" ==
Bill Carter and Ruth Ellsworth, of Austin, Texas were reading the Austin American-Statesman one morning and they read the syndicated column about Willie the Wimp. Carter said, "I said to Ruth, 'This isn't a column—it's a song'." They drove to the studio, and Carter said that "in the two miles it took us to get there we put the column to music." Jimmie Vaughan was at the studio, and he called his brother, Stevie Ray Vaughan, to tell him about it. Stevie liked the song, recorded it, and performed it live for his fans around the world. Much of the song's lyrics came directly out of the column including a quote from Willie the Wimp's mother where she described her and her husband's reason for wanting an extravagant funeral for their son. She said that her son "left like he lived—in a lively manner." It was worked into a verse in the song that says, "In his Cadillac to heaven he was waving that banner; He left like he lived, in a lively manner."

Bill Carter first released the song as "Willy The Wimp (And His Cadillac Coffin)" on his 1985 album, Stompin' Grounds. Jimmie Vaughan played lead guitar on Carter's album, and his brother, Stevie Ray Vaughan, released his version, titled: "Willie the Wimp" on his Live Alive album in July 1986. The blues-rock standard begins: "Willie the Wimp was buried today, They laid him to rest in a special way" which leads into a full description of the decadence that was Willie the Wimp's funeral. The song mentions "the casketmobile, Willie the Wimp's red suit, the money between his fingers, [and] the headlights" – into the catchy refrain, "Talkin' 'bout Willie the Wimp in his Cadillac coffin." Stevie Ray Vaughan performed the song live in concert at the Midtfyns Festival in Denmark in 1988.

== Ambush and death ==
Stokes was killed by two men who lay in wait for him as he stopped to drop off his girlfriend, Diane Miller, outside her residence on 79th Street and S. Ellis Avenue. On November 19, 1986, at 12:38 a.m., a gunman armed with a 12-gauge pump shotgun, pointed at the windshield and shot out the glass. He then proceeded to fire off more shells through the vehicle's passenger side. Stokes died from gunshot wounds in his mouth and upper chest. His driver, Ronald Johnson, was killed by a second gunman; firing a 9mm semi-automatic pistol. The woman ducked the assailant's line of fire sprawling the back seat and survived the attack; uninjured.

The shooters were never found. However, Stokes's bodyguard, Earl Wilson, was later charged with arranging the murders. In December 1987, he was found guilty of two counts of first degree murder. In January 1988, he was sentenced to life in prison. On appeal, however, Wilson's sentence was reduced to 60 years. He was released from prison on October 20, 2023, and will be discharged from parole on October 20, 2026.

Stokes was described by authorities as: "the richest and most flamboyant drug dealer on [Chicago's] South Side"; further stating that "[he] was known to win or lose as much as $250,000 over a single weekend in Las Vegas" – and that he "seldom missed a night at local race tracks". Although Stokes owned a local pool hall, law enforcement officials stated that Stokes was officially listed as "unemployed"; and that he declared gambling income on his tax returns to account for his wealth.

Unbeknownst to Stokes, the Drug Enforcement Administration (DEA) was concluding an investigation and was preparing to serve him with a federal grand jury indictment for "drug racketeering, operating a continuing criminal enterprise and income tax evasion".

Garfield Hammonds, assistant special agent in charge of the Chicago Drug Enforcement Administration said, "Chicago has lost one of its biggest sources of supply for cocaine and heroin", regarding Willie Stokes. Stokes was renowned for his flamboyance: usually wearing suits of fine silk, with his "fingers weighted with diamond-cluster rings as big as silver dollars, his forearms festooned with gold bracelets, a gem-emblazoned watch on his right wrist and a gold chain with a diamond-studded 'F' for 'Flukey' around his neck." However, on the day he died he was wearing jogging clothes and no jewelry at all. The Cook County medical examiner recorded that Stokes died wearing "blue sweatpants, powder blue undershorts, a red leather jacket, a red T-shirt underneath a blue T-shirt with the word 'Michigan' written on it, white sneakers, brown socks and a black cap."

== Funeral ==
Compared to his son's funeral, "Flukey" Stokes' arrangements were considerably modest. The service was held at the A.R. Leak Funeral Home on 78th Street and S. Cottage Grove Avenue, which also conducted the ceremony for the younger Stokes. Over 7,000 people filed past Flukey's casket for a final glimpse of the slain mobster. Stokes was mostly spoken of with reverence by the crowd in attendance—one young mourner said of Flukey: "I was walking on the same street he was walking, I went up to him. I spoke to him. He spoke back. I introduced myself. He shook my hand and everything." Mothers were seen lifting their young children above the coffin so they could see Stokes; adorned for his final viewing. He was laid "in a mahogany coffin with a custom-designed powder-blue interior". Stokes wore tinted sun-glasses, "a blue suit, blue silk shirt, blue tie and handkerchief and blue python shoes" and he was holding a portable telephone. The floral arrangements that surrounded him included "cars and dice fashioned from polystyrene foam, illustrating his passion for luxury automobiles and his claim on his income tax returns that his riches came from gambling."

== See also ==
- List of homicides in Illinois

== Bibliography ==
- Tucker, Donald W. (July 19, 2010). The Two-Edged Sword. Indianapolis, IN: Dog Ear Publishing. ISBN 9781608445660.
- Deparle, Jason (August 30, 2005). American Dream: Three Women, Ten Kids, And A Nation's Drive to End Welfare. New York, NY: Viking Penguin. ISBN 9781448713073.
