= Play (David Ball album) =

Studio album by David Ball
- Released: July 13, 1999
- Genre: Country
- Length: 34:04
- Label: Warner Bros. Nashville
- Producer: David Ball; Don Cook; Ben Fowler

David Ball chronology
Starlite Lounge (1996)	Play (1999)	Amigo (2001)

Singles from Play
- 1. "Watching My Baby Not Coming Back" Released: March 1999; 2. "I Want To with You" Released: August 1999

Professional ratings
Review scores
Source	Rating
Allmusic	link

Play is the fourth studio album by American country music singer David Ball. It was released in 1999 on Warner Bros. Records. The album produced the singles "Watching My Baby Not Come Back" (which Ball co-wrote with Brad Paisley) and "I Want To with You", which respectively reached numbers 47 and 67 on the Billboard country charts. Ball produced the album with Ben Fowler, except for "Watching My Baby Not Come Back", "Hasta Luego, My Love", "For You", and "When I Get Lonely", which were produced by Don Cook.

The track "What Do You Say to That" was also recorded by George Strait on his 1999 album Always Never the Same, from which it was released as a single. McBride & the Ride later recorded "Hasta Luego, My Love" under the title "Hasta Luego" on their 2002 album Amarillo Sky.

== Track listing ==
1. "Watching My Baby Not Come Back" (David Ball, Brad Paisley) – 3:39
2. "I Want To with You" (Steve Bogard, Jeff Stevens) – 3:37
3. "What Do You Say to That" (Jim Lauderdale, Melba Montgomery) – 2:50
4. "Hasta Luego, My Love" (Tommy Lee James, Terry McBride, Jennifer Kimball) – 3:28
5. "A Grain of Salt" (Ball, Monty Criswell) – 3:11
6. "Lonely Town" (Ball) – 3:07
7. "Going Someplace to Forget" (Ball, Jim Weatherly) – 3:58
8. "For You" (Ball, George McCorkle) – 3:02
9. "I'm Just a Country Boy" (Ball, Dennis Morgan) – 4:00
10. "When I Get Lonely" (Ball, James House) – 3:12

== Personnel ==
- Al Anderson - acoustic guitar, electric guitar
- David Ball - lead vocals
- Bruce Bouton - steel guitar, lap steel guitar
- Bob Britt - electric guitar
- Chris Carmichael - fiddle, background vocals
- Glen Caruba - percussion
- Mark Casstevens - acoustic guitar
- Joe Caverlee - background vocals
- Anthony Crawford - acoustic guitar
- Larry Franklin - fiddle
- Owen Hale - drums
- Wes Hightower - background vocals
- James House - acoustic guitar
- John Barlow Jarvis - keyboards
- Wayne Killius - drums
- Liana Manis - background vocals
- Brent Mason - acoustic guitar, electric guitar, gut string guitar
- Steve Nathan - keyboards
- Al Perkins - dobro, steel guitar
- Alison Prestwood - bass guitar
- Tom Roady - percussion
- Robby Turner - steel guitar
- Pete Wasner - keyboards
- Dennis Wilson - background vocals
- Lonnie Wilson - drums
- Glenn Worf - bass guitar

== Chart performance ==
Chart (1999)	Peak position
U.S. Billboard Top Country Albums	60
Canadian RPM Country Albums	21
