= Terry McBride (musician) =

American singer-songwriter (born 1958)

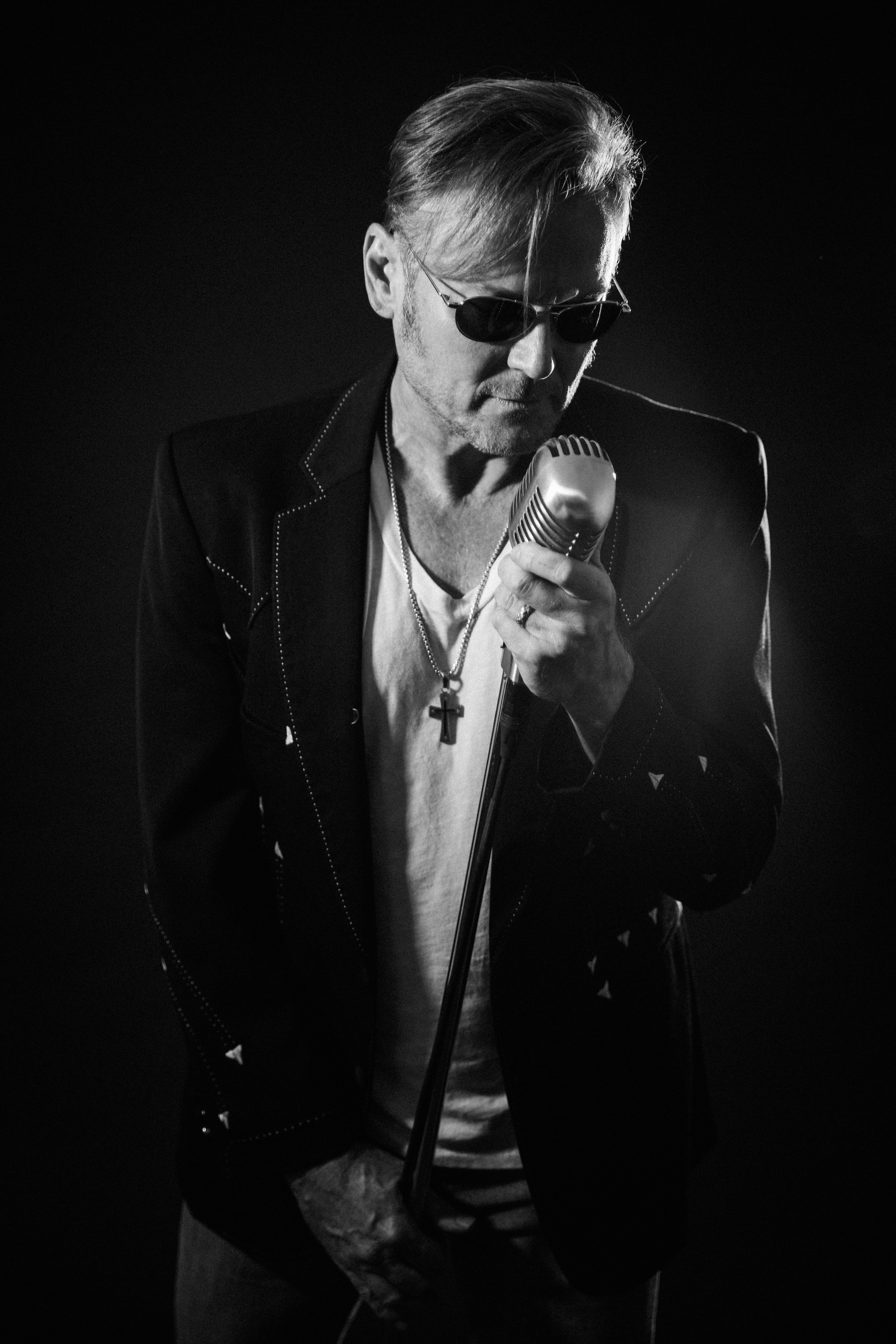
- McBride in 2015

Background information
- Born: September 16, 1958 (age 67); Taylor, Texas, U.S.
- Origin: Lampasas, Texas, U.S.
- Genres: Country
- Occupation: Singer-songwriter
- Instruments: Vocals, bass guitar
- Years active: 1989–present
- Labels: MCA; Dualtone; MV2 Entertainment
- Member of: McBride & the Ride
- Website: www.terrymcbridemusic.com

Terry McBride (born September 16, 1958) is an American country music artist. Between 1989 and 1994, and again from 2000 to 2002, McBride was the lead vocalist and bass guitarist in the band McBride & the Ride, a country music group which recorded four studio albums, received CMA and ACM Nominations for Vocal Group of the Year, and charted more than ten singles on the Billboard Hot Country Songs charts. The trio reunited a second time in 2021 and is currently touring throughout the country in support of their comeback EP, Marlboros & Avon. McBride continues to write and record solo music as well, including albums Hotels & Highways and Rebels & Angels. He is also the son of 1970s country singer Dale McBride.

== McBride & The Ride ==
In 1989, record producer Tony Brown introduced McBride to guitarist Ray Herndon and drummer Billy Thomas at CMA Fan Fair in Nashville, Tennessee. Together, the trio record McBride & The Ride's debut album Burnin' Up the Road which featured five singles including "Same Old Star" and "Can I Count On You".

Following the success of their debut record, the band went back to the studio in 1992 to record their sophomore record, Sacred Ground. It produced three singles for the trio, all of which were Top Five hits on the Billboard Hot Country Singles & Tracks (now Hot Country Songs) charts: "Just One Night", "Going out of My Mind", and "Sacred Ground", which was originally recorded by Kix Brooks (of Brooks & Dunn) on his self-titled debut album. Also included on this album is a cover of "All I Have to Offer You Is Me", originally recorded by Charley Pride. The album has also been certified gold by the RIAA.

1993 saw the release of Hurry Sundown. Released on MCA Records, it produced the hit singles "Love on the Loose, Heart on the Run" and the title track, which peaked at #3 and #17, respectively, on the Billboard Hot Country Singles & Tracks.

In 1994, the label removed Herndon and Thomas from the group, which was renamed Terry McBride & the Ride. McBride remained lead singer, while the other members were replaced with Keith Edwards (drums), Kenny Vaughan (electric guitar), Gary Morse (steel guitar), Jeff Roach (keyboards), and Randy Frazier (bass guitar). Roach and Vaughan were respectively replaced by Rick Gerken and Bob Britt shortly before their fourth album (1994's Terry McBride & the Ride), after which McBride & the Ride disbanded.

In September 2000, Herndon reunited with McBride and Thomas after meeting them at a party at the Handlebar-J Restaurant & Bar in Scottsdale, Arizona, to celebrate the club's 25th anniversary. After they performed "No More Cryin'" there, Herndon suggested that they officially reunite as McBride & the Ride. The trio recorded demo tapes and began searching for a record deal, signing to the independent Dualtone Records in 2002. Working with record producer Matt Rollings, McBride & the Ride recorded its only album for Dualtone, titled Amarillo Sky, and released it in September of that year.

McBride, Herndon, and Thomas reformed McBride & the Ride a second time in late 2021. In February 2022, the band had their first Nashville concert in 20 years. On November 4, 2022, the band released a new single titled "Marlboros & Avon". This was followed in March 2023 by a second single titled "Along Comes a Girl". Both of these songs will be included on an extended play also titled Along Comes a Girl, slated for release later in the year.

== Solo career ==
After McBride & the Ride disbanded in 1995, he found work as a songwriter, with country duo Brooks & Dunn recording more than two dozen of his songs. This figure includes the Number One hits "If You See Him/If You See Her" (recorded with Reba McEntire,) and "Play Something Country". In addition, McBride co-wrote Josh Gracin's 2005 single "Stay with Me (Brass Bed)". For his contributions as a songwriter, McBride has won 12 awards from Broadcast Music Incorporated.

McBride also co-wrote Reba McEntire's 2010 single "I Keep On Loving You", Casey James' 2011 single "Let's Don't Call It a Night" and several tracks on former Brooks & Dunn member Ronnie Dunn's debut album.

In 2017, McBride released his first solo record, an extended play titled Hotels & Highways.

In 2020, McBride released the album, Rebels & Angels, including 9 songs.

In 2021, McBride co-wrote several songs with country artist Drake Milligan, including "Sounds Like Something I'd Do", "Tipping Point", and "Cowboy Kind of Way", all of which would appear on Milligan's debut LP, Dallas/Fort Worth.

On February 24, 2024, the Texas Heritage Songwriters Association inducted McBride into the Texas Songwriters Hall of Fame alongside Eric Johnson, Jack Ingram, Jon Randall, and Ruthie Foster.

== Discography ==
=== Terry McBride ===
- Hotels & Highways (2017)
- Rebels & Angels (2020)

=== McBride & the Ride ===
- Burnin' Up the Road (1990)
- Sacred Ground (1992)
- Hurry Sundown (1993)
- Terry McBride & the Ride (1994)
- Amarillo Sky (2002)

=== Songwriting credits ===
Discography
Artist	Album	Song	Co-written with	Notes
Alan Jackson	Thirty Miles West (2012)	"Gonna Come Back as a Country Song”	Chris Stapleton	Album cut
Brooks and Dunn	Borderline (1996)	"I Am That Man"	Monty Powell	Single
Brooks and Dunn	The Greatest Hits Collection (1997)	"He's Got You"	Ronnie Dunn	Single
Brooks and Dunn	If You See Her (1998)	"I Can't Get Over You"	Ronnie Dunn	Single
Brooks and Dunn	If You See Her (1998)	"If You See Her"	Tommy Lee James, Jennifer Kimball	Single
Brooks and Dunn	If You See Her (1998)	"Your Love Don't Take a Backseat to Nothing"	Kix Brooks, Ronnie Dunn	Album cut
Brooks and Dunn	Tight Rope (1999)	"Goin' Under Gettin' Over You"	Ronnie Dunn	Album cut
Brooks and Dunn	Tight Rope (1999)	"Hurt Train"	Ronnie Dunn	Album cut
Brooks and Dunn	Tight Rope (1999)	"You'll Always Be Loved By Me"	Ronnie Dunn	Single
Brooks and Dunn	Tight Rope (1999)	"Beer Thirty"	Ronnie Dunn	Single
Brooks and Dunn	Tight Rope (1999)	"All Out of Love"	Ronnie Dunn	Album cut
Brooks and Dunn	Steers & Stripes (2001)	"Good Girls Go to Heaven"	Ronnie Dunn, Shawn Camp	Album cut
Brooks and Dunn	Steers & Stripes (2001)	"Deny, Deny, Deny"	Kix Brooks, Ronnie Dunn, Shawn Camp, Bob DiPiero	Album cut
Brooks and Dunn	Steers & Stripes (2001)	"Lucky Me, Lonely You"	Kix Brooks, Ronnie Dunn, Shawn Camp, Bob DiPiero	Album cut
Brooks and Dunn	Red Dirt Road (2003)	"That's What She Gets for Loving Me"	Ronnie Dunn	Single
Brooks and Dunn	Red Dirt Road (2003)	"Feels Good Don't It"	Ronnie Dunn	Album cut
Brooks and Dunn	Red Dirt Road (2003)	"She Was Born to Run"	Ronnie Dunn, Kenny Beard	Album cut
Brooks and Dunn	Hillbilly Deluxe (2005)	"Play Something Country"	Ronnie Dunn	Single
Brooks and Dunn	Hillbilly Deluxe (2005)	"She's About as Lonely as I'm Going to Let Her Get"	Ronnie Dunn	Album cut
Brooks and Dunn	Hillbilly Deluxe (2005)	"Whiskey Do My Talkin'"	Ronnie Dunn	Album cut
Brooks and Dunn	Hillbilly Deluxe (2005)	"Just Another Neon Night"	Ronnie Dunn	Album cut
Brooks and Dunn	Hillbilly Deluxe (2005)	"I May Never Get Over You"	Ronnie Dunn	Album cut
Brooks and Dunn	Cowboy Town (2007)	"Proud of the House We Built"	Ronnie Dunn, Marv Green	Single
Brooks and Dunn	Cowboy Town (2007)	"Cowgirls Don't Cry"	Ronnie Dunn	Single
Brooks and Dunn	Cowboy Town (2007)	"Tequila "	Ronnie Dunn	Album cut
Casey James	Casey James (2012)	"Let's Don't Call It a Night"	Casey James, Brice Long	Single
Casey James	Casey James (2012)	"Love the Way You Miss Me"	Casey James, Brice Long	Album cut
Clare Dunn	Clare Dunn	"Cowboy Side of You"	Clare Dunn, Brandon Hood	Album cut
Cody Johnson	Gotta Be Me (2016)	"Every Scar Has A Story"	Cody Johnson	Album cut
Cole Swindell	You Should Be Here	"Up"	Brad Tursi	Album cut
David Ball	Starlite Lounge	"Hangin' in and Hangin' On"	Gary Nicholson, Ray Herndon, Billy Thomas	Album cut
David Ball	Play	"Hasta Luego My Love"	Tommy Lee James, Jennifer Kimball	Album cut
Drake Milligan	Dallas/Fort Worth	"Sounds Like Something I'd Do"	Brett Beavers, Drake Milligan	Single
Drake Milligan	Dallas/Fort Worth	"Tipping Point"	Brandon Hood, Josh London, Drake Milligan	Album cut
Drake Milligan	Dallas/Fort Worth	"Cowboy Kind of Way"	Brandon Hood, Drake Milligan	Album cut
Easton Corbin	About to Get Real (2015)	"Are You With Me"	Tommy Lee James, Shane McAnally	Single
Easton Corbin	About to Get Real (2015)	"Wild Women and Whiskey”	Ronnie Dunn	Album cut
Emerson Drive	Tilt a Whirl (2015)	"Till the Summer's Gone"	Skip Black, Matt Nolen	Single (Canada)
Garth Brooks	Man Against Machine (2014)	"All-American Kid"	Craig Campbell, Brice Long	Album cut
George Canyon	I Got This (2016)	"Lifetime"	George Canyon, Brice Long	Album cut
George Ducas	George Ducas (1994)	"Teardrops"	George Ducas	Single
George Strait	Always Never the Same (1999)	"Always Never the Same"	Marv Green	Album cut
George Strait	Lead On (1994)	"Nobody Has to Get Hurt”	Jim Lauderdale	Album cut
Gord Bamford	Is It Friday Yet? (2012)	"Farm Girl Strong"	Gord Bamford, Byron Hill	Single
Gord Bamford	Is It Friday Yet? (2012)	"She Makes Me Look Good"	Gord Bamford, Byron Hill	Album cut
Gretchen Wilson	I Got Your Country Right Here (2010)	"Outlaws and Renegades"	Chris Stapleton	Album cut
Hank Williams, Jr.	It's About Time (2016)	"Those Days Are Gone"	Chris Janson, Brice Long	Album cut
Jack Ingram	Live Wherever You Are (2006)	"How Many Days?"	Jim Lauderdale	Album cut
James Otto	Shake What God Gave Ya (2010)	"She Comes To Me"	Chris Stapleton	Album cut
Jason Michael Carroll	Waitin' in the Country (2007)	"Let It Rain"	Jason Michael Carroll	Album cut
Jedd Hughes	Transcontinental (2004)	"I'm Your Man"	Jedd Hughes, Josh Leo	Album cut
Jedd Hughes	Transcontinental (2004)	"I'll Keep Movin'"	Jedd Hughes	Album cut
Jedd Hughes	Transcontinental (2004)	"Snake in the Grass"	Jedd Hughes	Album cut
Jedd Hughes	Transcontinental (2004)	"Time to Say Goodnight (Sweet Dreams Baby)"	Jedd Hughes, Tommy Lee James	Album cut
Jedd Hughes	Transcontinental (2004)	"I Don't Have a Clue"	Jedd Hughes, Al Anderson	Album cut
Jedd Hughes	Transcontinental (2004)	"Soldier for the Lonely"	Jedd Hughes	Single
Jedd Hughes	Transcontinental (2004)	"High Lonesome"	Jedd Hughes, Billy Burnette	Single
Jedd Hughes	Transcontinental (2004)	"All Mixed Up"	Jedd Hughes, Bruce Robison	Album cut
Jedd Hughes	Transcontinental (2004)	"The Only Girl in Town"	Jedd Hughes	Album cut
Jedd Hughes	Transcontinental (2004)	"Damn! You Feel Good"	Jedd Hughes	Album cut
Jim Lauderdale	This Changes Everything (2016)	"You Turn Me Around"	Jim Lauderdale	Album cut
John Anderson	8 Seconds	"Burnin' Up the Road"	Bill Carter, Ruth Ellsworth	Album cut
Josh Gracin	Josh Gracin (2004)	"Stay with Me (Brass Bed)"	Brett James, Jedd Hughes	Single
Josh Ward	More Than I Deserve (2018)	"All About Lovin'"	Chris Stapleton, Brice Long	Single
Josh Ward	More Than I Deserve (2018)	"Say Hello to Goodbye"	Marv Green	Album cut
Josh Ward	More Than I Deserve (2018)	"Another Heartache"	Brice Long, Brinley Addington	Album cut
Kix Brooks	New to This Town (2012)	"New to This Town"	Kix Brooks, Marv Green	Single
Kenny Rogers	There You Go Again (2000)	"There You Go Again"	Tommy Lee James, Jennifer Kimball	Single
Lonesome River Band	Still Learning (2010)	"High Lonesome"	Jedd Hughes, Billy Burnette	Album cut
Lost Frequencies	Less Is More	"Are You With Me"	Tommy Lee James, Jennifer Kimball	Single
McBride & The Ride	Burnin’ Up The Road (1990)	"Ain't No Big Deal"	Bill Carter, Ruth Ellsworth	Album cut
McBride & The Ride	Burnin’ Up The Road (1990)	"Felica"	Bill Carter, Ruth Ellsworth	Album cut
McBride & The Ride	Burnin’ Up The Road (1990)	"Same Old Star"	Bill Carter, Ruth Ellsworth, Gary Nicholson	Single
McBride & The Ride	Burnin’ Up The Road (1990)	"Every Step of the Way"	Bill Carter, Ruth Ellsworth	Album cut
McBride & The Ride	Burnin’ Up The Road (1990)	"Chains of Memory"	Bill Carter, Ruth Ellsworth	Album cut
McBride & The Ride	Burnin’ Up The Road (1990)	"Can I Count On You"	Bill Carter, Ruth Ellsworth	Single
McBride & The Ride	Burnin’ Up The Road (1990)	"Burnin' Up the Road"	Bill Carter, Ruth Ellsworth	Album cut
McBride & The Ride	Burnin’ Up The Road (1990)	"Nobody's Fool"	Bill Carter, Ruth Ellsworth	Album cut
McBride & The Ride	Burnin’ Up The Road (1990)	"Turn to Blue"	Rosie Flores	Album cut
McBride & The Ride	Sacred Ground	"Love's On the Line"	Gary Nicholson	Album cut
McBride & The Ride	Sacred Ground	"Makin' Real Good Time"	Allen Shamblin	Album cut
McBride & The Ride	Sacred Ground	"Going Out of My Mind"	Kostas	Single
McBride & The Ride	Sacred Ground	"Trick Rider"	Bill Carter, Ruth Ellsworth	Album cut
McBride & The Ride	Sacred Ground	"I'm the One"	Gary Nicholson	Album cut
McBride & The Ride	Sacred Ground	"Just One Night"		Single
McBride & The Ride	Hurry Sundown (1993)	"Don't Be Mean to Me"		Album cut
McBride & The Ride	Hurry Sundown (1993)	"The Promised Land"	Bob DiPiero, John Scott Sherill	Album cut
McBride & The Ride	Hurry Sundown (1993)	"Hangin' In and Hangin' On"	Billy Thomas, Ray Herndon, Gary Nicholson	Album cut
McBride & The Ride	Hurry Sundown (1993)	"Tell Me Again"	Walt Aldridge	Album cut
McBride & The Ride	Hurry Sundown (1993)	"Cream of the Crop"	Ronny Scaife	Album cut
McBride & The Ride	Hurry Sundown (1993)	"Hold Onto Me and Let Go of the Past"	Curtis Wright	Album cut
McBride & The Ride	8 Seconds	"No More Cryin'"	Josh Leo	Single
McBride & The Ride	Terry McBride & The Ride (1994)	"Teardrops"	George Ducas	Album cut
McBride & The Ride	Terry McBride & The Ride (1994)	"I'd Be Lyin'"	Josh Leo	Album cut
McBride & The Ride	Terry McBride & The Ride (1994)	"I'll See You Again Someday"	Tim Mensey	Album cut
McBride & The Ride	Terry McBride & The Ride (1994)	"He's Living in My Dreams"	Walt Aldridge	Album cut
McBride & The Ride	Amarillo Sky (2002)	"Sure Feels Like It"	Steve Bogard, Marv Green	Album cut
McBride & The Ride	Amarillo Sky (2002)	"Anything that Touches You"	Steve Bogard, Marv Green	Single
McBride & The Ride	Amarillo Sky (2002)	"You Take My Heart There"	Marv Green	Album cut
McBride & The Ride	Amarillo Sky (2002)	"Leave Her with Me"	Vicky McGehee, Wendell Mobley	Album cut
McBride & The Ride	Amarillo Sky (2002)	"Yours"	Ray Herndon, Billy Thomas, Gary Nicholson	Album cut
McBride & The Ride	Amarillo Sky (2002)	"Hasta Luego"	Tommy Lee James, Jennifer Kimball	Album cut
McBride & The Ride	Amarillo Sky (2002)	"When Somebody Loves You"	Ray Herndon, Billy Thomas, Gary Nicholson	Album cut
Reba McEntire	If You See Him (1998)	"If You See Him"	Tommy Lee James, Jennifer Kimball	Single
Reba McEntire	All the Woman I Am (2008)	"A Little Want To"	Brice Long	Album cut
Reba McEntire	Keep On Loving You (2009)	"I Keep On Loving You"	Ronnie Dunn	Single
Ricky Van Shelton	Fried Green Tomatoes	"I'm the One"	Gary Nicholson	Album cut
Ronnie Dunn
Ronnie Dunn	Ronnie Dunn (2011)	"How Far to Waco"	Ronnie Dunn	Album cut
Ronnie Dunn	Ronnie Dunn (2011)	"I Can't Help Myself"	Ronnie Dunn	Album cut
Ronnie Dunn	Ronnie Dunn (2011)	"Love Owes Me One"	Ronnie Dunn, Bobby Pinson	Album cut
Rosie Flores	Dance Hall Dreams (1999)	"Little Bit More"	Rosie Flores	Album cut
Trace Adkins	Something's Going On (2017)	"Ain't Just the Whiskey Talkin'"	Brett Beavers	Album cut
Triston Marez	That Was All Me (2019)	"Dizzy”	Brice Long, Ryan Griffin	Album cut
Wade Hayes	Highways & Heartaches (2000)	"Up and Down"	Marv Green	Album cut

== Awards and nominations ==
=== As McBride & the Ride ===
Year	Ceremony	Category	Result
1992	Academy of Country Music Awards	New Vocal Duo or Group of the Year	Nominated
1992	Country Music Association Awards	Vocal Group of the Year	Nominated
1993	Academy of Country Music Awards	Vocal Group of the Year	Nominated

=== As Terry McBride ===
Year	Ceremony	Category	Nominated work	Result
2009	BMI Awards	President's Award	"Cowgirls Don't Cry"	Won
