= New to This Town =

Album by Kix Brooks

Studio album by Kix Brooks
- Released: September 11, 2012
- Genre: Country
- Length: 42:02
- Label: Arista Nashville
- Producers: Kix Brooks, Jay DeMarcus

Kix Brooks chronology
Kix Brooks (1989)	New to This Town (2012)	Ambush at Dark Canyon (Official Motion Picture Soundtrack) (2014)

Singles from New to This Town
- 1. "New to This Town" Released: March 19, 2012; 2. "Bring It On Home" Released: September 4, 2012; 3. "Moonshine Road" Released: November 19, 2012; 4. "Complete 360" Released: 2013; 5. "There's the Sun" Released: 2013

Professional ratings
Review scores
Source	Rating
AllMusic	3.5/5 stars

New to This Town is the second solo studio album by American country music artist Kix Brooks. It was released on September 11, 2012, via Arista Nashville. It is Brooks' first album after his split as one half of Brooks & Dunn. Brooks produced the album and co-wrote nine of its twelve tracks. Its first single, the title track, features Joe Walsh on guitar and was co-produced by Jay DeMarcus, one third of Rascal Flatts. This album was followed by the soundtrack to Brooks' film Ambush at Dark Canyon, for which he composed most of the musical score and also starred in.

== Track listing ==
No.	Title	Writer(s)	Length
1.	"New to This Town" (featuring Joe Walsh)	Kix Brooks, Marv Green, Terry McBride	4:20
2.	"Moonshine Road"	Brooks, Leslie Satcher	4:20
3.	"Bring It On Home"	Brooks, Rhett Akins, Dallas Davidson	3:43
4.	"There's the Sun"	Trent Summar, Brandon Kinney	3:05
5.	"Complete 360"	Brooks, Rafe Van Hoy	3:15
6.	"My Baby"	Brian Gene White, Bruce Wallace	2:54
7.	"Tattoo"	Curly Putman, Brooks, Van Hoy	3:24
8.	"In the Right Place"	Akins, Davidson, Ben Hayslip	3:47
9.	"Next to That Woman"	Brooks, Rivers Rutherford	3:20
10.	"Let's Do This Thing"	Brooks, Satcher	2:56
11.	"Closin' Time at Home"	Bob DiPiero, Brooks, David Lee Murphy	3:36
12.	"She Knew I Was a Cowboy"	Brooks, Tony Lane, David Lee	3:22

== Personnel ==
- Eli Beaird – bass guitar
- Larry Beaird – acoustic guitar
- Kix Brooks – lead vocals
- Jim "Moose" Brown – piano
- Dennis Burnside – keyboards
- Mark Casstevens – acoustic guitar
- Perry Coleman – background vocals
- J.T. Corenflos – electric guitar
- Chad Cromwell – drums
- Howard Duck – piano, Wurlitzer
- Dan Dugmore – steel guitar
- Kenny Greenberg – electric guitar
- Rob Hajacos – fiddle
- Mark Hill – bass guitar
- John Barlow Jarvis – piano
- Troy Lancaster – electric guitar
- Greg Morrow – drums
- Gary Morse – steel guitar
- Dan Needham – drums
- Kim Parent – background vocals
- Michael Rhodes – bass guitar
- Tania Smith – organ
- Russell Terrell – background vocals
- Ilya Toshinsky – acoustic guitar
- Joe Walsh – slide guitar on "New to This Town"
- Scott Williamson – drums
- Lonnie Wilson – drums
- Jonathan Yudkin – fiddle, dobro, bouzouki, acoustic guitar, harmonica, mandolin

== Chart performance ==
=== Album ===
Chart (2012)	Peak position
US Billboard 200	53
US Billboard Top Country Albums	10

=== Singles ===
Year	Single	Peak chart positions	
Year	Single	US Country	US Country Airplay
2012	"New to This Town" (with Joe Walsh)	31	—
2012	"Bring It On Home"	39	44
2012	"Moonshine Road"	42	45
2013	"Complete 360"	—	49
2013	"There's the Sun"	—	48
"—" denotes releases that did not chart
