= Terry McBride & the Ride =

Studio album by McBride & the Ride
- Released: September 13, 1994
- Genre: Country
- Length: 32:03
- Label: MCA
- Producer: Josh Leo

McBride & the Ride chronology
| Hurry Sundown (1993) | Terry McBride & the Ride (1994) | Amarillo Sky (2002) |

Terry McBride & the Ride is the fourth studio album recorded by American country music band McBride & the Ride. It was released via MCA Records in 1994. This album features a different lineup than other McBride & the Ride albums; it is also the only album they recorded under the name "Terry McBride & the Ride". "Been There", "Somebody Will", and "High Hopes and Empty Pockets" were all released as singles from this album, although none reached Top 40.

"Teardrops" was also released by George Ducas in 1994 as his debut single, and "Somebody Will" by River Road in 1998 as the third single from their self-titled debut album.

== Track listing ==
1. "Teardrops" (George Ducas, Terry McBride) - 2:59
2. "I Can't Dance" (Andy Byrd, Jim Robinson) - 3:21
3. "Been There" (Don Schlitz, Bill Livsey) - 3:28
4. "I'd Be Lyin'" (McBride, Rick Bowles, Josh Leo) - 3:15
5. "Somebody Will" (Walt Aldridge, Brad Crisler, Steven Dale Jones) - 2:44
6. "High Hopes and Empty Pockets" (Byrd, Robinson) - 3:45
7. "Before I Fall in Love" (Dann Huff, Kurt Howell) - 3:25
8. "Nothin' Nobody Can Say" (Steve Bogard, Jeff Stevens) - 3:28
9. "He's Living My Dreams" (Aldridge, McBride) - 3:45
10. "I'll See You Again Someday" (Tim Mensy, McBride) - 3:53

== Personnel ==
- Max Carl – background vocals, keyboards
- Chad Cromwell – drums
- Bill Cuomo – keyboards
- Glen Duncan – fiddle
- Rob Hajacos – fiddle
- John Hammond – drums, percussion
- Dann Huff – electric guitar
- Brent Mason – electric guitar
- Terry McBride – lead vocals
- Gary Morse – steel guitar
- Jeffrey Roach – B-3 organ
- Timothy B. Schmit – background vocals
- Leland Sklar – bass guitar
- Harry Stinson – background vocals
- Kenny Vaughn – electric guitar
- Biff Watson – acoustic guitar
