= 8 Seconds (soundtrack) =

Soundtrack album by Various Artists
- Released: January 18, 1994
- Genre: Country
- Length: 41:11
- Label: MCA
- Producer: Various

8 Seconds is the soundtrack to the movie 8 Seconds. It was released in 1994 by MCA Records. The album peaked at no. 3 on the Billboard Top Country Albums chart.

== Content ==
Four cuts from the album made the Billboard Hot Country Songs charts: McBride & the Ride's "No More Cryin'" at no. 26, David Lee Murphy's "Just Once" at no. 36, Reba McEntire's "If I Had Only Known" at no. 72 and Brooks & Dunn's "Ride 'em High, Ride 'em Low" at no. 73. Of these songs, "If I Had Only Known" previously appeared on McEntire's 1991 album For My Broken Heart, while "Just Once" later appeared on Murphy's 1994 debut album Out with a Bang. "Burnin' Up the Road", performed here by John Anderson, was previously the title track to McBride & the Ride's 1991 debut album of the same name.

== Critical reception ==
Professional ratings
Review scores
Source	Rating
Country Weekly	favorable
New Country	2.5/5 stars

Scott Neal Wilson of Country Weekly gave the soundtrack a positive review, saying that its sound would "not only appeal to country fans[...]but also to a pop-rock audience pulled in by the movie's inspirational storyline." Giving the album 2 1/2 stars out of 5, Jim Ridley of New Country magazine wrote that "While each of the tracks is agreeable in its own right, together they're like a radio station you can't escape. When you hear a good track, you want to hear more from that artist; when you hear a dull track, you have no guarantee the next one won't be as lame." He praised the performances of John Anderson and Brooks & Dunn as the strongest.

== Track listing ==
No.	Title	Performer(s)	Writer(s)	Producer(s)	Length
1.	"Burnin' Up the Road"	John Anderson	Bill Carter; Ruth Ellsworth; Terry McBride	James Stroud	3:41
2.	"Pull Your Hat Down Tight"	Pam Tillis	Lewis Storey	Tillis	2:31
3.	"No More Cryin'"	McBride & the Ride	Josh Leo; Terry McBride	Leo	3:02
4.	"Standing Right Next to Me"	Karla Bonoff	Bonoff; Wendy Waldman	Keith Thomas	3:47
5.	"Ride 'em High, Ride 'em Low"	Brooks & Dunn	Ronnie Dunn	Dunn	3:23
6.	"Just Once"	David Lee Murphy	Murphy; Kim Tribble	Tony Brown	3:00
7.	"When Will I Be Loved"	Vince Gill; Bonoff	Phil Everly	Andrew Gold; Kenny Edwards	2:04
8.	"If I Had Only Known"	Reba McEntire	Craig Morris; Jana Stanfield	McEntire; Brown	4:01
9.	"Texas Is Bigger Than It Used to Be"	Mark Chesnutt	Ronnie Rogers; Mark Wright	Wright	4:08
10.	"You Hung the Moon"	Patty Smyth	Kevin Savigar; Smyth	Don Was	3:59
11.	"Once in a While"	Billy Dean	John Bettis; Steve Dorff	Brown	3:59
12.	"Lane's Theme"	Bill Conti	Conti	Conti	3:36

== Charts ==
=== Weekly charts ===
Chart (1994)	Peak position
Canadian Albums (RPM)	51
Canadian Country Albums (RPM)	7
US Billboard 200	33
US Top Country Albums (Billboard)	3

=== Year-end charts ===
Chart (1994)	Position
US Top Country Albums (Billboard)	38

== Certifications ==
Region	Certification	Certified units/sales
United States (RIAA)	Platinum	1,000,000^{^}
^{^} Shipments figures based on certification alone.
