= Sacred Ground (McBride & the Ride album) =

Studio album by McBride & the Ride
- Released: April 28, 1992
- Recorded: Late 1991 at Sound Stage Studio, Nashville, TN
- Genre: Country rock
- Length: 34:12
- Label: MCA
- Producers: Tony Brown; Steve Gibson

McBride & the Ride chronology
Burnin' Up the Road (1990)	Sacred Ground (1992)	Hurry Sundown (1993)

Singles from Sacred Ground
- 1. "Sacred Ground" Released: March 2, 1992; 2. "Going Out of My Mind" Released: July 13, 1992; 3. "Just One Night" Released: November 16, 1992

Professional ratings
Review scores
Source	Rating
Allmusic	4.5/5 stars
Entertainment Weekly	(C+)

Sacred Ground is the second studio album by American country music band McBride & the Ride. It produced three singles for the trio, all of which were Top Five hits on the Billboard Hot Country Singles & Tracks (now Hot Country Songs) charts: "Just One Night", "Going out of My Mind", and "Sacred Ground", which was originally recorded by Kix Brooks (of Brooks & Dunn) on his self-titled debut album. Also included on this album is a cover of "All I Have to Offer You Is Me", originally recorded by Charley Pride. The album has also been certified gold by the RIAA. "I'm the One" was later covered by Ricky Van Shelton on his 2000 album Fried Green Tomatoes, which also includes his cover of "All I Have to Offer You Is Me." "Baby, I'm Loving You Now" features lead vocals by guitarist Ray Herndon.

== Track listing ==
No.	Title	Writer(s)	Length
1.	"Love's on the Line"	Terry McBride, Gary Nicholson	3:10
2.	"Sacred Ground"	Kix Brooks, Vernon Rust	3:18
3.	"Makin' Real Good Time"	McBride, Allen Shamblin	2:47
4.	"Going Out of My Mind"	McBride, Kostas	4:01
5.	"Trick Rider"	McBride, Ruth Ellen Ellsworth, Bill Carter	3:58
6.	"All I Have to Offer You Is Me"	Dallas Frazier, A.L. "Doodle" Owens	3:09
7.	"Your One and Only"	Hillary Kanter, Even Stevens	3:21
8.	"I'm the One"	McBride, Nicholson	3:50
9.	"Baby, I'm Loving You Now"	Jackson Leap	2:54
10.	"Just One Night"	McBride	3:44
Total length:			34:12

== Charts ==
Chart (1992)	Peak position
U.S. Billboard 200	144
U.S. Billboard Top Country Albums	27
U.S. Billboard Top Heatseekers	3
Canadian RPM Country Albums	15
