= Can I Count On You =

Single by McBride & the Ride

from the album Burnin' Up the Road
- B-side: "Turn to Blue"
- Released: March 16, 1991
- Genre: Country
- Length: 3:18
- Label: MCA
- Songwriters: Terry McBride, Bill Carter, Ruth Ellsworth
- Producers: Tony Brown, Steve Fishell

McBride & the Ride singles chronology
"Every Step of the Way" (1990)	"Can I Count On You" (1991)	"Same Old Star" (1991)

"Can I Count On You" is a song written by Terry McBride, Bill Carter and Ruth Ellsworth, and recorded by American country music group McBride & the Ride. It was released in March 1991 as the third single from the album Burnin' Up the Road. The song reached number 15 on the U.S. Billboard Hot Country Singles & Tracks chart and peaked at number 9 on the RPM Country Tracks chart in Canada.

== Music video ==
The music video was directed by Bill Young and premiered in early 1991.

== Chart performance ==
Chart (1991)	Peak position
Canada Country Singles (RPM)	9
US Hot Country Songs (Billboard)	15

=== Year-end charts ===
Chart (1991)	Position
Canada Country Tracks (RPM)	99
