= Just One Night (song) =

Single by McBride & the Ride

from the album Sacred Ground
- B-side: "All I Have to Offer You (Is Me)"
- Released: November 16, 1992
- Genre: Country
- Length: 3:44
- Label: MCA
- Songwriter: Terry McBride
- Producers: Tony Brown; Steve Gibson

McBride & the Ride singles chronology
"Going Out of My Mind" (1992)	"Just One Night" (1992)	"Love on the Loose, Heart on the Run" (1993)

"Just One Night" is a song written by Terry McBride and recorded by American country music group McBride & the Ride. It was released in November 1992 as the third single from their album Sacred Ground. The song reached number 5 on the Billboard Hot Country Singles & Tracks chart.

== Critical reception ==
Lisa Smith and Cyndi Hoelzle of Gavin Report reviewed the song positively, praising McBride's lead vocals and his bandmates' harmonies.

== Music video ==
The music video was directed by Tom Grubbs and premiered in late 1992.

== Chart performance ==
"Just One Night" debuted at number 72 on the U.S. Billboard Hot Country Singles & Tracks for the week of November 14, 1992.

Chart (1992–1993)	Peak position
Canada Country Singles (RPM)	6
US Hot Country Songs (Billboard)	5

=== Year-end charts ===
Chart (1993)	Position
Canada Country Tracks (RPM)	91
