= Christine Albert =

French heritage singer-songwriter

- Born: 1955 (age 70–71); Rome, New York, U.S.
- Genres: Pop/rock, folk, country
- Occupations: Singer-songwriter, philanthropic executive
- Instruments: vocal, guitar
- Years active: 1990–present
- Labels: MoonHouse Records; Dos; Gambini Global
- Member of: Albert and Gage
- Website: Official website

Christine Albert (born 1955) is an American singer-songwriter. Her music is French bilingual, with Texas country. She is the founder of the compassionate non-profit Swan Songs, an organization that fulfills musical last wishes of individuals nearing the end of their lives. Albert serves as chair emeritus of the board of trustees for the National Academy of Recording Arts and Sciences.

== Early life ==
Born and raised in Rome, New York, at age 16 she moved to Santa Fe, New Mexico, where she began her music career, and then relocated to Austin, Texas, in 1982.

== Music career ==
Adopting Austin as her home base, she frequently played in clubs, releasing her first album in 1990. Since then she has recorded and released more than a dozen additional albums as a solo artist or as a member of Albert and Gage. Albert has also performed on three dozen other musical albums as guest artist or backup vocalist with such artists as B.W. Stevenson, Jerry Jeff Walker, Erik Moll, 8½ Souvenirs, Max Stalling, Green Carnation, Eliza Gilkyson, and Marcia Ball.

In 1994 she appeared on the PBS music television program Austin City Limits with Paul Glasse.

From 2007 to 2015 Albert served on the Board of Trustees for The National Academy of Recording Arts and Sciences, the organization that presents the Grammy Awards. During her period of service on the board, she was elected National Chairperson. In 2017 she returned to the board, serving as Chair Emeritus.

Albert co-hosts Mystery Monday, a weekly show at the South Austin's Tex-Mex restaurant, the El Mercado, featuring some of Austin's most popular musicians.

== Charitable work ==
In 2005 Albert founded Swan Songs, a charitable organization dedicated to the fulfillment of musical last wishes through private concerts in and around Austin, Texas. Concerts are held in hospitals, care facilities and private homes. Swan Songs matches the musical request with the requested musician, style of music, or a particular instrument. Patients, family or facilities are never charged for this service. In 2017 Swan Songs organized 353 concerts for terminally ill individuals, performed by 167 different musicians.

== Personal life ==
Albert lives in Austin, Texas with her music partner and husband Chris Gage.

== Discography ==
=== Solo studio albums ===
Year	Title
1990	You Are Gold
1992	Texafrance
1993	The High Road
1995	Underneath the Lone Star Sky
2003	Texafrance Encore
2008	Paris, Texasfrance
2014	Everything's Beautiful Now

=== Albums with Albert and Gage ===
Year	Title
1995	Christmas with Christine
1997	Jumpin’ Tracks
2001	Boxcars
2001	Burnin’ Moonlight
2001	One More Christmas
2003	Albert and Gage at Anderson Fair (Live)
2005	Cry Love
2009	Dakota Lullaby

=== Albert and Gage other appearances ===
Year	Title	Contribution
2000	Texas Songwriters	#6 Hey Jimmy
2002	Texas to the Bone, Vol 3	#10 Life is a Miracle
2002	Kerrville Folk Festival: Silver Wolf Years 7 discs	disc No. 6, #6 Hey Jimmy
2010	Wings of War -Single	Primary artists

== Awards ==
- Kerrville Folk Festival "1996 Female Vocalist of the Year"
- Austin Chamber of Commerce "Superstar of Austin Music"
- 2018 Inductee – Texas Music Legends Hall of Fame
