= Same Old Star =

Single by McBride & the Ride

from the album Burnin' Up the Road
- B-side: "Stone Country"
- Released: August 3, 1991
- Genre: Country
- Length: 3:34
- Label: MCA
- Songwriters: Terry McBride; Bill Carter; Ruth Ellsworth; Gary Nicholson
- Producers: Tony Brown, Steve Fishell

McBride & the Ride singles chronology
"Can I Count On You" (1991)	"Same Old Star" (1991)	"Sacred Ground" (1992)

"Same Old Star" is a song recorded by American country music group McBride & the Ride. It was released in August 1991 as the fourth single from the album Burnin' Up the Road. The song reached #28 on the Billboard Hot Country Singles & Tracks chart. The song was written by Terry McBride, Bill Carter, Ruth Ellsworth and Gary Nicholson.

== Chart performance ==
Chart (1991)	Peak position
Canada Country Singles (RPM)	17
US Hot Country Songs (Billboard)	28
