= Burnin' Up the Road =

Studio album by McBride & the Ride
- Released: August 10, 1990
- Recorded: 1990
- Studio: Sound Stage Studios, Nashville, TN
- Genre: Neotraditional country; country rock
- Length: 33:44
- Label: MCA
- Producer: Tony Brown; Steve Fishell

McBride & the Ride chronology
Burnin' Up the Road (1990)	Sacred Ground (1992)

Singles from Burnin' Up the Road
- 1. "Felicia" Released: May 1990; 2. "Every Step of the Way" Released: September 1990; 3. "Can I Count On You" Released: March 16, 1991; 4. "Same Old Star" Released: August 3, 1991

Professional ratings
Review scores
Source	Rating
AllMusic	3/5 stars
Entertainment Weekly	C+

Burnin' Up the Road is the debut studio album by American country music band McBride & the Ride. Released in 1990 on MCA Records, it was produced by Tony Brown and Steve Fishell. The lead-off single, "Felicia", peaked at No. 74 on the RPM country charts in Canada but did not chart in the US. Following this song was "Every Step of the Way" which failed to chart. The third and fourth singles, "Can I Count on You" and "Same Ol' Star", peaked at No. 15 and No. 28 respectively on the Billboard country charts in the US. "Every Step of the Way" was also made into the band's first music video.

The title track was later recorded by John Anderson on the soundtrack to the 1994 film 8 Seconds.

== Track listing ==
All songs composed by Bill Carter, Ruth Ellsworth, and Terry McBride except where noted.

No.	Title	Writer(s)	Length
1.	"Ain't No Big Deal"		2:49
2.	"Felicia"		3:12
3.	"Same Old Star"	Carter, Ellsworth, McBride, Gary Nicholson	3:34
4.	"Every Step of the Way"		3:07
5.	"Chains of Memory"		3:33
6.	"Stone Country"	Robert Byrne, Tom Brasfield	3:40
7.	"Can I Count On You"		3:18
8.	"Burnin' Up the Road"		3:31
9.	"Nobody's Fool"		4:01
10.	"Turn to Blue"	Rosie Flores, McBride	2:59

== Charts ==
=== Weekly charts ===
Chart (1991)	Peak position
US Billboard 200	180
US Top Country Albums (Billboard)	27

=== Year-end charts ===
Chart (1991)	Position
US Top Country Albums (Billboard)	65
