= Love on the Loose, Heart on the Run =

Single by McBride & the Ride

from the album Hurry Sundown
- B-side: "Hangin' In and Hangin' On"
- Released: March 15, 1993
- Genre: Country
- Length: 3:08
- Label: MCA
- Songwriters: Kostas; Anna Lisa Graham
- Producers: Tony Brown; Steve Gibson

McBride & the Ride singles chronology
"Just One Night" (1993)	"Love on the Loose, Heart on the Run" (1993)	"Hurry Sundown" (1993)

"Love on the Loose, Heart on the Run" is a song written by Kostas and Anna Lisa Graham, and recorded by American country music group McBride & the Ride. It was released in March 1993 as the first single from their album Hurry Sundown. The song reached number 3 on the Billboard Hot Country Singles & Tracks chart.

Its b-side, "Hangin' In and Hangin' On", was later recorded by David Ball, who released his version in 1996 from the album Starlite Lounge.

== Chart performance ==
Chart (1993)	Peak position
Canada Country Singles (RPM)	8
US Hot Country Songs (Billboard)	3

=== Year-end charts ===
Chart (1993)	Position
US Country Songs (Billboard)	65
