= Hurry Sundown (McBride & the Ride song) =

Single by McBride & the Ride

from the album Hurry Sundown
- B-side: "Just the Thought of Losing You"
- Released: July 19, 1993
- Genre: Country
- Length: 3:35
- Label: MCA
- Songwriters: Keith Stegall, Denny Henson, Brent Mason
- Producers: Steve Gibson, Tony Brown

McBride & the Ride singles chronology
"Love on the Loose, Heart on the Run" (1993)	"Hurry Sundown" (1993)	"No More Cryin'" (1994)

"Hurry Sundown" is a song written by Keith Stegall, Denny Henson and Brent Mason, and recorded by American country music group McBride & the Ride. It was released in July 1993 as the second single and title track from the album Hurry Sundown. The song reached No. 17 on the U.S. Billboard Hot Country Singles & Tracks chart and peaked at No. 8 on the RPM Country Tracks in Canada.

== Content ==
The song is about a loving, working-class couple who look forward to "sundown" so they can enjoy each other and forget about the stresses of the day.

== Music video ==
The music video was directed by Wayne Miller and premiered in July 1993.

== Chart performance ==
"Hurry Sundown" debuted at number 59 on the U.S. Billboard Hot Country Singles & Tracks chart for the week of July 31, 1993.

Chart (1993)	Peak position
Canada Country Singles (RPM)	8
US Hot Country Songs (Billboard)	17
