= Hurry Sundown (McBride & the Ride album) =

Studio album by McBride & the Ride
- Released: April 27, 1993
- Recorded: Late 1992 & Early 1993
- Studio: 16th Avenue Sound, Back Stage Studios, and Recording Arts Studios, Nashville, TN
- Genre: Country
- Length: 33:58
- Label: MCA
- Producer: Tony Brown; Steve Gibson

McBride & the Ride chronology
Sacred Ground (1992)	Hurry Sundown (1993)	Terry McBride & the Ride (1994)

Singles from Hurry Sundown
- 1. "Love on the Loose, Heart on the Run" Released: March 15, 1993; 2. "Hurry Sundown" Released: July 19, 1993

Professional ratings
Review scores
Source	Rating
AllMusic	4.5/5 stars
Entertainment Weekly	B

Hurry Sundown is the third studio album by American country music band McBride & the Ride. Released in 1993 on MCA Records, it produced the hit singles "Love on the Loose, Heart on the Run" and the title track, which peaked at #3 and #17, respectively, on the Billboard Hot Country Singles & Tracks (now Hot Country Songs) charts.

The track "Hangin' in and Hangin' On" was later recorded by David Ball on his 1996 album Starlite Lounge, from which it was released as a single. "Sweetwater" was later recorded by Greg Holland on his 1994 debut album Let Me Drive, and by Aaron Tippin on his 1998 album What This Country Needs.

== Track listing ==
No.	Title	Writer(s)	Length
1.	"Love on the Loose, Heart on the Run"	Kostas, Anna Lisa Graham	3:08
2.	"Hurry Sundown"	Keith Stegall, Denny Henson, Brent Mason	3:35
3.	"Don't Be Mean to Me"	Terry McBride	2:50
4.	"The Promise Land"	Bob DiPiero, John Scott Sherrill, McBride	3:49
5.	"Hangin' In and Hangin' On"	McBride, Billy Thomas, Ray Herndon, Gary Nicholson	2:49
6.	"Tell Me Again"	Walt Aldridge, McBride	3:22
7.	"Cream of the Crop"	Ronny Scaife, McBride	2:48
8.	"Hold on to Me and Let Go of the Past"	Curtis Wright, McBride	3:21
9.	"Just the Thought of Losing You"	Herndon, Skip Ewing	4:17
10.	"Sweetwater"	Jon Vezner, Allen Shamblin	4:00

== Chart performance ==
Chart (1993)	Peak position
U.S. Billboard Top Country Albums	53
U.S. Billboard Top Heatseekers	17
