= Amarillo Sky (song) =

2001 song by John Rich

Song by John Rich

from the album Rescue Me
- Released: 2001
- Genre: Country
- Songwriters: Big Kenny; Rodney Clawson; John Rich; Bart Pursley

"Amarillo Sky" is a song written by Big Kenny and John Rich (of Big & Rich), along with Rodney Clawson and Bart Pursley. It was originally recorded by Rich for his album Rescue Me in 2001. McBride & the Ride also recorded a version and released it as a single in 2002 from their album of the same name. Country music artist Jason Aldean later covered the song for his 2005 self-titled debut album, and his version was released as its third single in June 2006. It earned Aldean two nominations at the 2006 Academy of Country Music Awards for Video of the Year and Song of the Year, as well as video with the best direction at the CMT Music Awards.

== McBride & the Ride version ==
In 2002, McBride & the Ride recorded a version of the song for their comeback album of the same name and released it as a single.

"Amarillo Sky"

Single by McBride & the Ride

from the album Amarillo Sky
- Released: May 21, 2002
- Genre: Country
- Length: 3:23
- Label: Dualtone
- Songwriters: Big Kenny; Rodney Clawson; John Rich; Bart Pursley
- Producer: Matt Rollings

== Content ==
The song tells the story of a farmer who works on his family's farm near Amarillo, Texas, where co-writer John Rich is from. The farmer is enduring one of the droughts that plague the Panhandle of Texas, where co-writer Rodney Clawson grew up (as a native of Gruver, Texas). The song mentions the various hardships that the farm has faced, such as a damaging hailstorm in 1983 and an increase in the price of diesel fuel. In the chorus, the farmer prays to God that the farm will remain viable ("He says 'Lord, I never complain, I never ask why / Please don't let my dreams run dry / Underneath, underneath this Amarillo sky.'").

== Jason Aldean version ==
In 2005, country music artist Jason Aldean covered the song for his self-titled debut album and his version was released as its third single in June 2006.

"Amarillo Sky"

Single by Jason Aldean

from the album Jason Aldean
- Released: June 26, 2006
- Recorded: 2005
- Genre: Country
- Length: 3:22
- Label: Broken Bow
- Songwriters: Big Kenny; Rodney Clawson; John Rich; Bart Pursley
- Producer: Michael Knox

Jason Aldean singles chronology
"Why" (2005)	"Amarillo Sky" (2006)	"Johnny Cash" (2007)

It earned Aldean two nominations at the 2006 Academy of Country Music Awards for Video of the Year and Song of the Year as well as video with the best direction at the CMT Music Awards.

== Music video ==
The music video was directed by Wes Edwards. It features Jason Aldean and his band playing the song under an old, torn-up barn. It shows young farmers from central Illinois who help take care of their farm. At the beginning of the video (which was cut from the video at times), the young farmers tell their stories of how they grew up on their farms, and how much their farms meant to them. The video premiered on CMT's Top 20 Countdown on the week of 17 August 2006.

== Chart performance ==
"Amarillo Sky" debuted at number 52 on the U.S. Billboard Hot Country Songs for the week of July 15, 2006.

Chart (2006–2007)	Peak position
Canada Country (Billboard)	29
US Billboard Hot 100	59
US Hot Country Songs (Billboard)	4

=== Year-end charts ===
Chart (2007)	Position
US Country Songs (Billboard)	52

== Certifications ==
Region	Certification	Certified units/sales
United States (RIAA)	3× Platinum	3,000,000^{‡}
^{‡} Sales+streaming figures based on certification alone.
