= Kix Brooks =

American singer and songwriter (born 1955)

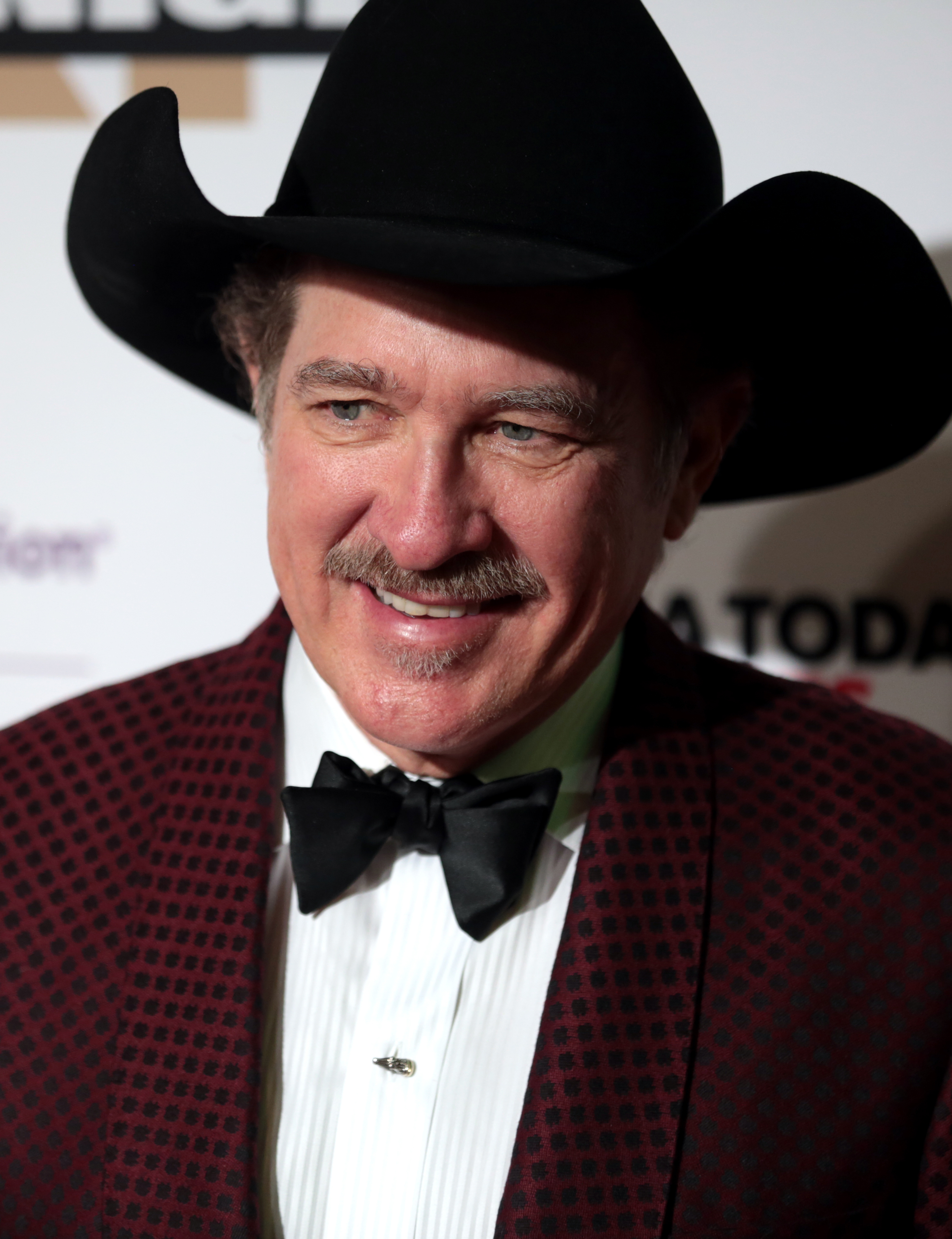
- Brooks in Phoenix, March 2018

Background information
- Born: Leon Eric Brooks III; May 12, 1955 (age 71); Shreveport, Louisiana, U.S.
- Genres: Country
- Occupations: Singer; songwriter; musician; radio personality; producer
- Instruments: Guitar; mandolin; harmonica; piano
- Years active: 1983–present
- Labels: Avion Records; Capitol Records; Arista Nashville
- Member of: Brooks & Dunn
- Website: kixbrooks.com

Leon Eric "Kix" Brooks III (born May 12, 1955) is an American country music artist, actor, and film producer best known for being one half of the duo Brooks & Dunn and host of radio's American Country Countdown. Prior to the duo's foundation, he was a singer and songwriter and had songs chart twice on Hot Country Songs and released an album on Capitol Records. Brooks and Ronnie Dunn performed as Brooks & Dunn for 20 years and then both members began solo careers. Brooks’ solo career after Brooks & Dunn includes the album New to This Town.

In 2019, Brooks was inducted into the Country Music Hall of Fame as a member of Brooks & Dunn.

== Early life ==
Brooks grew up in Shreveport, Louisiana. He has a half-sister and a half-brother; his father also adopted a son of his third wife. He had a sister, Midge, who died in 2014. After graduating from the former Sewanee Military Academy, an Episcopal school in Sewanee, Tennessee, he attended Louisiana Tech University in Ruston as a theater arts major. He moved to Alaska to work with his father on an oil pipeline for one summer, then returned to Louisiana Tech to finish his education. After graduating, he moved to Maine to write advertising for a company owned by his sister and brother-in-law.

== Musical career ==
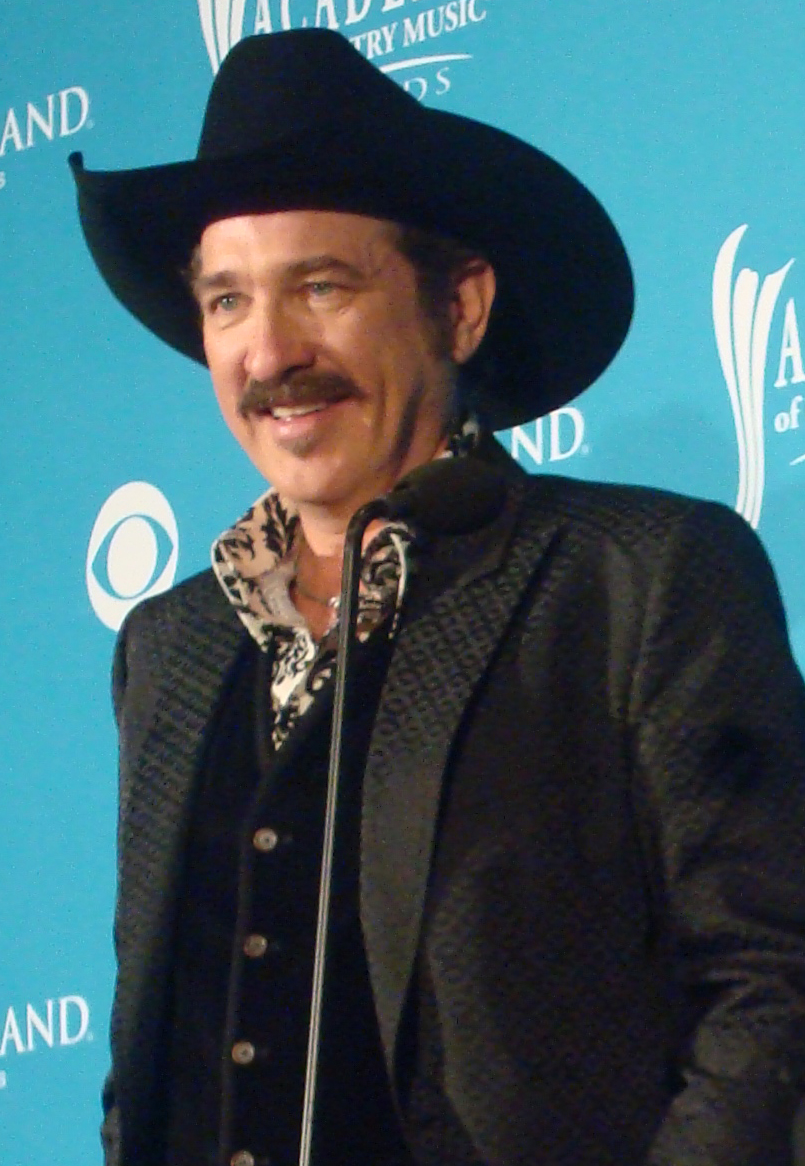
Brooks at the 2010 CMAs at the Bridgestone Arena in Nashville

Kix Brooks' father urged him to pursue his desire to become a musician, and he moved to Nashville in the early 1980s. His girlfriend (now wife Barbara) followed suit shortly thereafter. They have a son and daughter. He worked for Tree Publishing as a staff songwriter. He recorded his first solo single, "Baby, When Your Heart Breaks Down", for Avion in 1983, but returned to songwriting after it only reached No. 73 on the Hot Country Songs chart. Brooks and Dan Tyler co-wrote "Modern Day Romance", released by the Nitty Gritty Dirt Band in June 1985; it became the band's second No. 1 hit on the country chart.

Brooks released a self-titled album in 1989 on Capitol Records. The album featured the song "Sacred Ground" which became a No. 2 country hit for McBride & the Ride in 1992.

He is one half of country music duo Brooks & Dunn. Their 1991 debut album, Brand New Man, generated four number-one hit singles on the country charts. Brooks usually provided backing vocals on their songs and singles. The singles featuring Brooks on lead vocals include, "You're Gonna Miss Me When I'm Gone" (the only Brooks & Dunn single featuring Brooks on lead vocals to reach No. 1), "Lost and Found", "Rock My World (Little Country Girl)", "Mama Don't Get Dressed Up for Nothing", "South of Santa Fe", and "Why Would I Say Goodbye".

On August 10, 2009, Brooks & Dunn announced to their fans via their website that they would disband after 20 years of touring. According to the short statement released on their web site, Brooks & Dunn intended to release a greatest hits album, tour during the rest of 2009, and have a farewell tour in 2010.

Brooks resumed his solo career in 2012, releasing a new 12-track album on September 11, 2012. New to This Town features nine songs co-written by Brooks, including the album's first single, the title track. His second album followed with the soundtrack to the western film Ambush at Dark Canyon in 2014. Brooks composed the majority of the musical score as well as starring in the film.

On December 3, 2014, Brooks & Dunn reunited, and along with Reba McEntire, performed a series of concerts in Las Vegas throughout the summer and fall of 2015. Brooks performed at the 2019 Musicians Hall of Fame and Museum Concert and Induction Ceremony.

== Awards ==
In 2005, Brooks, along with timber industrialist Roy O. Martin Jr., Andrew Young as well as Paul Dietzel and Sue Gunter, sports legends from Louisiana State University in Baton Rouge were among those named a "Louisiana Legend" by Louisiana Public Broadcasting.

== Other achievements ==
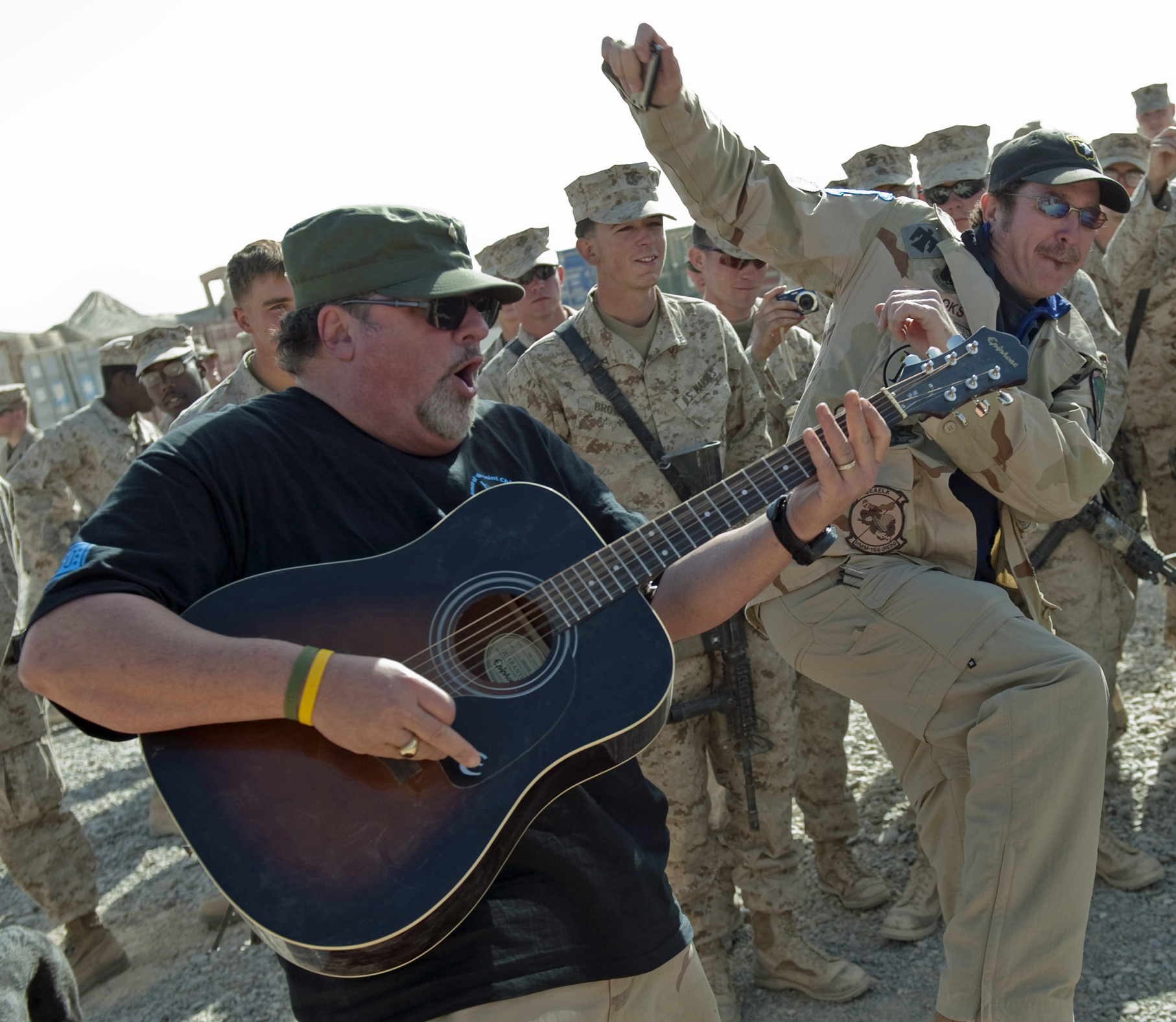
Brooks (right) performing with Bob DiPiero for U.S. troops in Afghanistan on behalf of the USO in December 2010

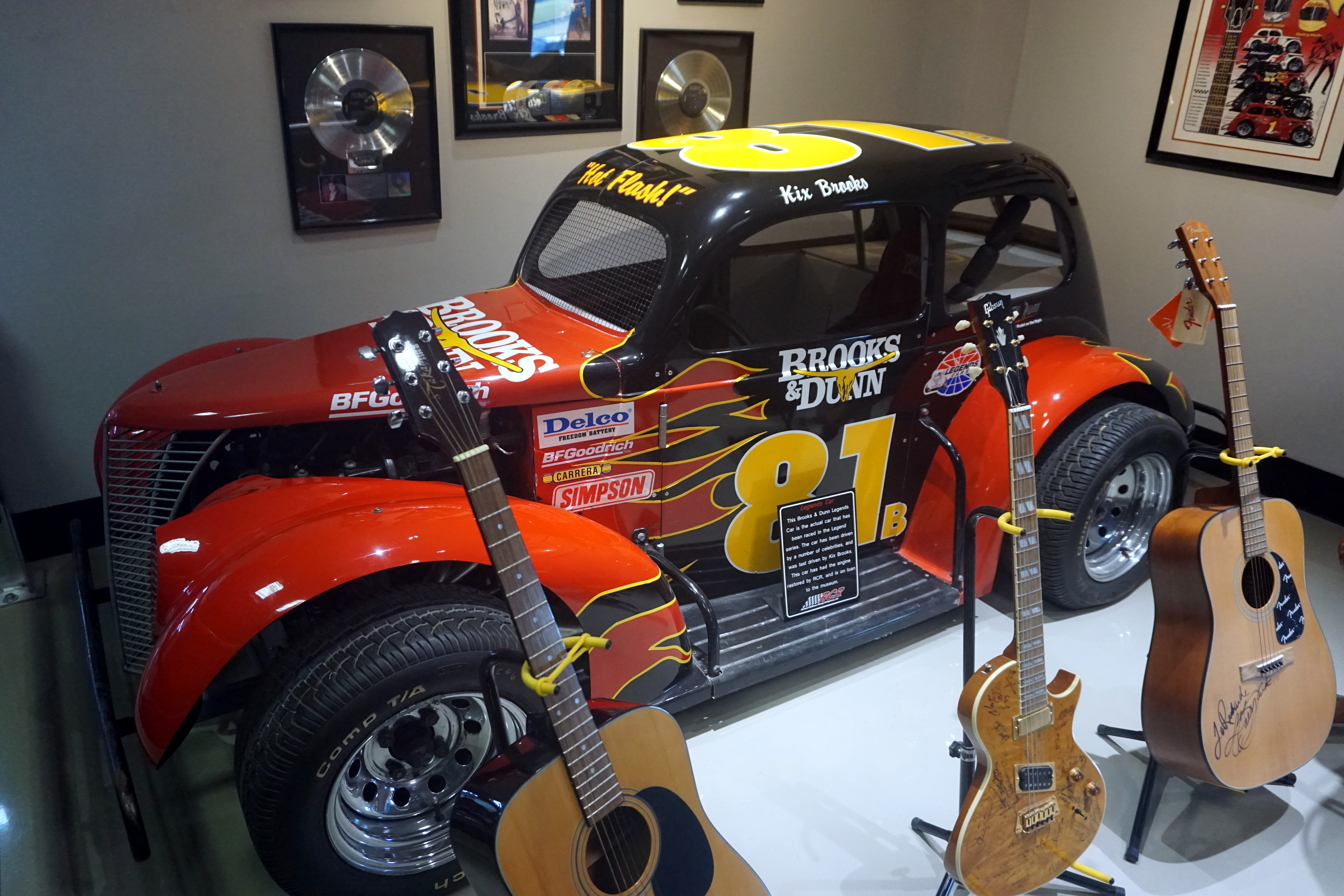
Brooks' No. 81B legends car

From January 2006 to December 2024, Brooks hosted American Country Countdown, a syndicated radio countdown show based on Mediabase (originally was BILLBOARD, from 2006 to August 2009), country charts. Brooks succeeded the show's former host, Bob Kingsley and was replaced by Ryan Fox beginning in January 2025. Brooks is the co-owner of Arrington Vineyards, a Nashville winery with winemaker Kip Summers and businessmen John Russell.

In 2013, Kix launched the film company Team Two Entertainment along with Eric Brooks. The company makes independent films Kix produces, and Kix occasionally appears as an actor. In 2015, Brooks contracted with Cooking Channel to host Steak Out with Kix Brooks, On the show, he traveled around the U.S. in search of the best steakhouses.

== Discography ==
=== Albums ===
Title	Details	Peak positions	
Title	Details	US Country	US
Kix Brooks	Release date: August 14, 1989; Label: Capitol Records; Formats: CD, LP, cassette	—	—
New to This Town	Release date: September 11, 2012; Label: Arista Nashville; Formats: CD, music download	10	53
Ambush at Dark Canyon (soundtrack)	Release date: January 14, 2014; Label: Phase 4 Films; Formats: CD (Walmart exclusive)	—	—
"—" denotes releases that did not chart

=== Singles ===
Year	Single	Peak positions		Album
Year	Single	US Country Songs	US Country Airplay	Album
1983	"Baby, When Your Heart Breaks Down"	73		Non-album single
1983	"Make a Little Hay"	—		Non-album single
1988	"I'm On to You"	—		Kix Brooks
1989	"Sacred Ground"	87		Kix Brooks
1989	"She Does the Walk On By"	—		Kix Brooks
2012	"New to This Town" (featuring Joe Walsh)	31		New to This Town
2012	"Bring It On Home"	39	44	New to This Town
2012	"Moonshine Road"	42	45	New to This Town
2013	"Complete 360"	—	49	New to This Town
2013	"There's the Sun"	—	48	New to This Town
"—" denotes releases that did not chart

==== As a featured artist ====
Year	Single	Peak positions		Album
Year	Single	US Country Songs	US Country Airplay	Album
1990	"Tomorrow's World" (Note: Multi-artist collaboration featuring Lynn Anderson, Butch Baker, Shane Barmby, Billy Hill, Suzy Bogguss, Kix Brooks, T. Graham Brown, The Burch Sisters, Holly Dunn, Foster & Lloyd, Vince Gill, William Lee Golden, Highway 101, Shelby Lynne, Johnny Rodriguez, Dan Seals, Les Taylor, Pam Tillis, Mac Wiseman, and Kevin Welch.)	74		Non-album single
2016	"Damn Drunk" (Ronnie Dunn with Kix Brooks)	42	36	Tattooed Heart

=== Music videos ===
Year	Video	Director
2012	"New to This Town"	Team Two Entertainment
2012	"Bring It On Home"	Dustin Rikert
2012	"Moonshine Road"	Aaron Thomas

== Filmography ==
=== Film ===
Year	Film	Role	Notes
1994	8 Seconds	Himself	Brooks and Dunn
2013	A Country Christmas	Duke the horse	Executive Producer/Music Producer
2013	Dug Up	Producer Only	Executive Producer
2014	Ambush at Dark Canyon	Duke Donovan	Executive Producer
2014	Born Wild	Wade Locklin	Executive Producer
2016	Timber the Treasure Dog	Timber (voice)	
2016	A Horse Story	Champion (voice)	
2016	You're Gonna Miss Me	Elmer Montana	Executive Producer
2018	Home by Spring	Arthur	Television film (Hallmark)
2020	A Nashville Christmas Carol	Spirit of Christmas Past	Television film (Hallmark)

=== Television ===
Year	Film	Role	Notes
2000	King of the Hill	Himself	Season 4, Episode 24
2015	Steak Out with Kix Brooks	Host	Also co-executive producer
