= Going Out of My Mind =

Single by McBride & the Ride

from the album Sacred Ground
- B-side: "Trick Rider"
- Released: July 13, 1992
- Genre: Country
- Length: 4:01
- Label: MCA
- Songwriters: Kostas; Terry McBride
- Producers: Tony Brown; Steve Gibson

McBride & the Ride singles chronology
"Sacred Ground" (1992)	"Going Out of My Mind" (1992)	"Just One Night" (1993)

"Going Out of My Mind" is a song written by Terry McBride and Kostas, and recorded by American country music group McBride & the Ride. It was released in July 1992 as the second single from their album Sacred Ground. The song reached number 5 on the Billboard Hot Country Singles & Tracks chart.

== Critical reception ==
Deborah Evans Price, of Billboard magazine reviewed the song favorably, saying that the song is "smoothly performed" and that it showcases the bands "sturdy harmonies." She goes on to call the production, "light and airy" and that the repetitious chorus line is difficult to forget.

== Music video ==
The music video for "Going Out of My Mind" was directed, produced, and filmed by Sherman Halsey.

== Chart performance ==
"Going Out of My Mind" debuted at number 71 on the U.S. Billboard Hot Country Singles & Tracks for the week of July 18, 1992.

Chart (1992)	Peak position
Canada Country Singles (RPM)	11
US Hot Country Songs (Billboard)	5

=== Year-end charts ===
Chart (1992)	Position
US Country Songs (Billboard)	64
