= Amarillo Sky (album) =

Studio album by McBride & the Ride
- Released: May 21, 2002
- Genre: Country
- Length: 36:19
- Label: Dualtone
- Producer: Matt Rollings; McBride & the Ride

McBride & the Ride chronology
Terry McBride & the Ride (1994)	Amarillo Sky (2002)

Professional ratings
Review scores
Source	Rating
Allmusic	3/5 stars

Amarillo Sky is the fifth studio album released by American country music trio McBride & the Ride. It was their first and only album after the reunion of the band's three original members (lead vocalist/bass guitarist Terry McBride, drummer Billy Thomas and guitarist Ray Herndon). The album produced three singles in "Anything That Touches You", "Squeeze Box" (originally recorded by The Who) and the title track. While "Anything That Touches You" peaked at #50 on the Billboard country charts, the latter two singles failed to chart.

The title track was later recorded by Jason Aldean on his self-titled debut album, from which it was released as a single in 2006. "Hasta Luego" was previously recorded by David Ball under the title "Hasta Luego, My Love" on his 1999 album Play.

== Track listing ==
1. "Amarillo Sky" (Kenny Alphin, John Rich, Rodney Clawson, Bart Pursley) – 3:23
2. "Sure Feels Like It" (Steve Bogard, Marv Green, Terry McBride) – 3:26
3. "Anything That Touches You" (Bogard, Green, McBride) – 3:59
4. "You Take My Heart There" (Green, McBride) – 3:30
5. "Leave Her With Me" (McBride, Vicky McGehee, Wendell Mobley) – 3:46
6. "Yours" (McBride, Ray Herndon, Billy Thomas, Gary Nicholson) – 3:42
7. "Squeeze Box" (Pete Townshend) – 2:57
8. "Why Not Colorado" (Monty Powell, Jimmie Lee Sloas, Anna Wilson) – 3:26
9. "Hasta Luego" (Tommy Lee James, Jennifer Kimball, McBride) – 3:14
10. "When Somebody Loves You" (Herndon, McBride, Thomas, Nicholson) – 4:56

== Personnel ==
=== McBride & the Ride ===
- Ray Herndon - acoustic guitar, electric guitar, high-strung guitar, gut string guitar, fretted Dobro, background vocals
- Terry McBride - bass guitar, lead vocals, background vocals
- Billy Thomas - drums, percussion, maracas, background vocals

=== Additional musicians ===
- David Angell - violin
- Ron Block - banjo
- John Catchings - cello
- Eric Darken - percussion
- David Davidson - violin
- Dan Dugmore - steel guitar
- Paul Franklin - steel guitar
- Jim Hoke - harmonica, Jew's harp
- Gary Morse - steel guitar
- Matt Rollings - piano, Wurlitzer, Hammond organ, Mellotron, Roland Juno-60, keyboard sitar
- Kristin Wilkinson - viola, violin
