= McBride & the Ride =

American country music band

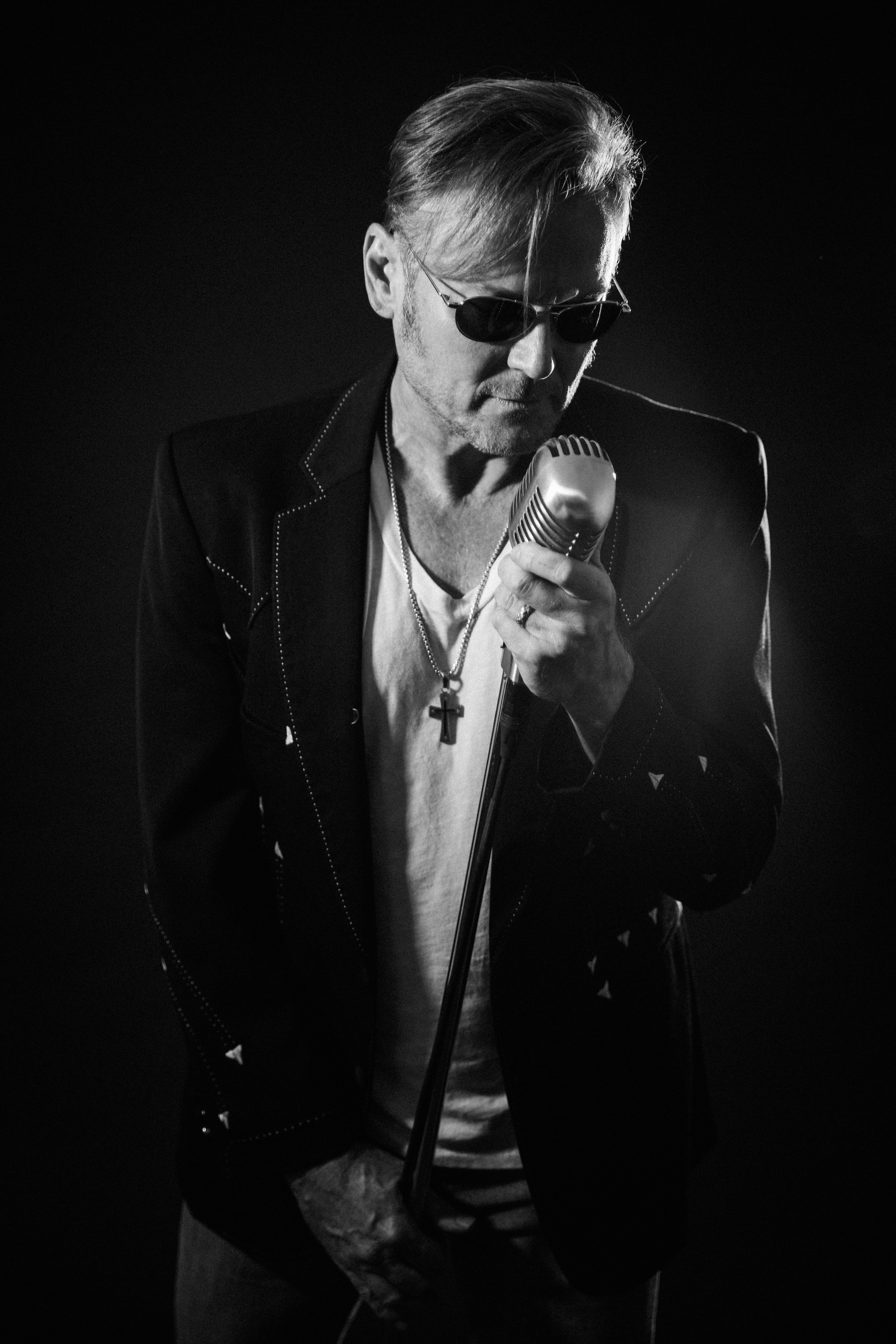
- Lead singer Terry McBride.

Background information
- Also known as: Terry McBride & the Ride
- Origin: Nashville, Tennessee, US
- Genres: Country
- Years active: 1989–1995, 2000–2002, 2021–present
- Labels: MCA Nashville; Dualtone
- Members: Terry McBride; Ray Herndon; Billy Thomas
- Past members: Keith Edwards; Randy Frazier; Gary Morse; Jeff Roach; Kenny Vaughan; Bob Britt; Rick Gerken

McBride & the Ride is an American country music band consisting of Terry McBride (lead vocals, bass guitar), Ray Herndon (background vocals, guitars), and Billy Thomas (background vocals, drums). The group was founded in 1989 through the assistance of record producer Tony Brown. McBride & the Ride's first three albums — Burnin' Up the Road, the gold-certified Sacred Ground, and Hurry Sundown, released in 1991, 1992, and 1993, respectively — were all issued on MCA Nashville. These albums also produced several hits on the Billboard country charts, including the Top 5 hits "Sacred Ground" (their highest-peaking, at No. 2), "Going Out of My Mind", "Just One Night", and "Love on the Loose, Heart on the Run".

In 1994, the label removed Herndon and Thomas from the group, which was renamed Terry McBride & the Ride. McBride remained lead singer, while the other members were replaced with Keith Edwards (drums), Kenny Vaughan (electric guitar), Gary Morse (steel guitar), Jeff Roach (keyboards), and Randy Frazier (bass guitar), formerly of the band Palomino Road. Roach and Vaughan were respectively replaced by Rick Gerken and Bob Britt shortly before their fourth album (1994's Terry McBride & the Ride), after which McBride & the Ride disbanded. During the hiatus, MCA issued a compilation called Country's Best, while McBride and Herndon wrote singles for other artists. McBride, Thomas, and Herndon reunited as McBride & the Ride in 2000, releasing Amarillo Sky on Dualtone Records in 2002 before splitting up again. McBride later joined the backing band for the duo Brooks & Dunn and continued to write singles for other artists, while Herndon self-released a solo album, and Thomas joined The Time Jumpers. McBride & the Ride re-established a second time in 2021.

== History ==
McBride & the Ride was created in 1989 when Tony Brown, then the executive vice president of MCA Records, decided to establish a new country music band in order to compete with Alabama, who he thought was falling out of favor with country radio. At the time, guitarist Ray Herndon (born July 14, 1960) was serving as a backing musician for Lyle Lovett, then a recording artist for MCA. Brown suggested that Herndon join lead vocalist Terry McBride (born September 16, 1958), whom Herndon did not yet know, in the new band that Brown had planned. McBride, a musician since childhood, had worked as a backing musician for his father, Dale McBride, and later for Delbert McClinton and Rosie Flores. At the Fan Fair (now CMA Music Festival) in Nashville, Tennessee, Brown introduced McBride and Herndon to drummer Billy Thomas (born October 24, 1953), who had previously played for Emmylou Harris and Mac Davis, and the band's lineup was in place. Brown had also chosen steel guitarist Steve Fishell to be a fourth member, but Fishell declined and chose to work as a record producer instead. The trio pitched their songs through the assistance of songwriters Bill Carter and Ruth Ellsworth, and four of those demos ended up on the band's first album.

== Musical career ==
McBride & the Ride performed its first concert in Detroit, Michigan. In 1990, the band released its debut single "Felicia", which peaked at number 74 on the RPM country charts in Canada in 1990 but did not enter the US country charts. Its followup, "Every Step of the Way", failed to chart in both countries. The band was almost dropped from MCA's roster due to poor chart performance, until the release of "Can I Count on You", which peaked at number 15 on the Billboard country charts and was made into a music video. This song's success led to the release of McBride & the Ride's 1991 debut album Burnin' Up the Road, on which McBride co-wrote all but one of the songs. The last single from this album, "Same Old Star", peaked at number 28. After the album's release, the band began touring the United States with The Judds and Highway 101.

During the band's earliest years, its members were featured prominently on other artists' albums. Thomas also played drums for The Remingtons, a country vocal group featuring former Bread member Jimmy Griffin, on its 1991 debut album Blue Frontier, while Thomas and Herndon sang background vocals on then-labelmate Marty Stuart's 1991 album Tempted. Finally, McBride and Thomas sang on the track "How Do I Break It to My Heart" on Kenny Rogers' 1991 album Back Home Again.

Sacred Ground, the band's second album, came out in 1992. This album was McBride & the Ride's most successful, with all three of its singles reaching Top 5 on the country charts: "Sacred Ground" at number 2, followed by "Going Out of My Mind" (which McBride co-wrote with Kostas) and "Just One Night," both at number 5. "Sacred Ground" was co-written by Kix Brooks, who had previously released the song in 1989 from his self-titled debut album for Capitol Records before joining Ronnie Dunn to form Brooks & Dunn in 1991. In 1992, McBride & the Ride received a Top New Vocal Group or Duo nomination from the Academy of Country Music and Vocal Group of the Year nomination from the Country Music Association. More than four years after its release, Sacred Ground was certified gold by the Recording Industry Association of America for shipping 500,000 copies. Despite these sales, McBride remarked that the band still nearly lost its recording contract, due to other artists on the label selling even more strongly.

McBride & the Ride's third album, Hurry Sundown, was released in 1993. It produced the band's fourth and final Top 5 hit in the number 3 "Love on the Loose, Heart on the Run" (which Kostas also co-wrote), as well as a Top 20 in its title track, the only other single release. "Hangin' In and Hangin' On", the B-side to "Love on the Loose, Heart on the Run", was later released by David Ball as a single from his 1996 album Starlite Lounge. In 1994, the band charted its last Top 40 hit, "No More Cryin'", which McBride and Josh Leo co-wrote for the soundtrack to the film 8 Seconds. The same album featured John Anderson's rendition of the title track to Burnin' Up the Road. Also that same year, McBride & the Ride recorded a cover version of Southern rock band Lynyrd Skynyrd's "Saturday Night Special" on the MCA compilation album Skynyrd Frynds, which featured country artists' renditions of Lynynrd Skynyrd songs.

=== Change to Terry McBride & the Ride and first disbanding ===
By March 1994, Herndon and Thomas left the group, as the label had decided to shift the band's focus to McBride, and Herndon did not want to be "push[ed] to the background." According to Herndon, the members "parted as friends." A new bass guitarist, Randy Frazier, was brought in, also as part of the label's decision to focus more on McBride. Frazier had previously been a member of Palomino Road, which recorded one album for Liberty Records in 1992. Completing the new lineup were Keith Edwards (drums), Kenny Vaughan (lead guitar), Gary Morse (steel guitar), and Jeff Roach (keyboards), who had previously played in McBride & the Ride's road band. McBride then bought the naming rights to the band and renamed it Terry McBride & the Ride. One album (also titled Terry McBride & the Ride) and three singles were released under the new name, with Josh Leo serving as producer. By the time of the album's release, Rick Gerken had replaced Roach, and Bob Britt had replaced Vaughan. Additionally, only McBride and Morse performed on it, with the rest of the instruments performed by session musicians and Roach. The album's singles, "Been There", "High Hopes and Empty Pockets", and "Somebody Will", all failed to reach Top 40, and the band broke up in 1995. River Road later released a version of "Somebody Will" from their 1997 self-titled debut album, and George Ducas released "Teardrops", a cut from Terry McBride & the Ride, on his 1994 self-titled debut album.

MCA released a compilation package entitled Country's Best in 1996, which included their first ten singles, from "Felicia" to "No More Cryin'". Herndon and McBride both worked as songwriters during McBride & the Ride's hiatus. Herndon co-wrote Kenny Chesney's 1996 single "Me and You" with Skip Ewing, while McBride co-wrote several songs for Brooks & Dunn, including the Top Five hits "I Am That Man", "He's Got You" and "I Can't Get Over You", as well as the Number One "If You See Him/If You See Her", which featured guest vocals from Reba McEntire. Thomas, meanwhile, worked as a backing musician for Vince Gill, and Vaughan went on to join Trent Summar & the New Row Mob in 2000.

=== Reunion and second disbanding ===
In September 2000, Herndon reunited with McBride and Thomas after meeting them at a party at the Handlebar-J Restaurant & Bar in Scottsdale, Arizona, to celebrate the club's 25th anniversary. After they performed "No More Cryin'" there, Herndon suggested that they officially reunite as McBride & the Ride, saying "This thing in my gut was telling me that this was the right time for this." The trio recorded demo tapes and began searching for a record deal, signing to the independent Dualtone Records in 2002. Working with pianist and record producer Matt Rollings, McBride & the Ride recorded its only album for Dualtone, titled Amarillo Sky, and released it in September of that year. Unlike previous albums, the band wrote most of the songs and played most of the instruments itself because, according to Thomas, "Terry thought this would be even more of a band-like situation if we wrote together more. It would bring us even tighter as a unit."

Lead-off single "Anything That Touches You" reached number 50 on the country charts in 2002, representing the band's final chart entry. Following it were the non-charting singles "Squeeze Box" (a cover of a song made famous by The Who) and "Amarillo Sky." The latter was co-written by Big Kenny and John Rich (who would later form the duo Big & Rich), and was later recorded by Jason Aldean on his 2005 self-titled debut album. Aldean's version was released in late 2006 and peaked at number 4 on the country charts in early 2007. Also included on Amarillo Sky was the track "Hasta Luego", co-written by McBride and previously found on David Ball's 1999 album Play.

McBride & the Ride's members disbanded a second time after the release of Amarillo Sky. After this disbanding, McBride became the bass guitarist in Brooks & Dunn's road band. He continued to co-write songs for them, including the Number One hit "Play Something Country" from 2005, as well as "Proud of the House We Built", "Cowgirls Don't Cry", and several album cuts. McBride also co-wrote Josh Gracin's 2005 single "Stay with Me (Brass Bed)" with Jedd Hughes and Brett James. McBride also produced Hughes's 2004 album Transcontinental. Herndon self-released a solo album entitled Livin' the Dream in late 2005. This album included his own rendition of "Me and You" with background vocals from Sonya Isaacs, and a duet with Clint Black on "Grain of Salt." McBride has also written for Reba McEntire and Casey James. Meanwhile, Thomas toured with the Little River Band and the Time Jumpers. In late 2017, McBride released an EP titled Hotels & Highways.

McBride, Herndon, and Thomas reformed McBride & the Ride a second time in late 2021. In February 2022, the band had their first Nashville concert in 20 years. On November 4, 2022, the band released a new single titled "Marlboros & Avon". This was followed in March 2023 by a second single titled "Along Comes a Girl". Both of these songs will be included on an extended play also titled Along Comes a Girl, slated for release later in the year.

== Musical stylings and critical reception ==
McBride & the Ride's sound was defined by close, three-part vocal harmonies. Between their vocal styles and the "crisp, gentle rockers" that the MCA albums contained, McBride & the Ride was compared to other rock-influenced country vocal bands such as Alabama and Southern Pacific. In his book The Encyclopedia of Country Music, writer Paul Kingsbury describes McBride & the Ride as having "found success with a series of middle-of-the-road singles with tight harmonies."

Ronnie Dunn, with whom McBride collaborated when he wrote songs for Brooks & Dunn, said that he was a fan of the band before McBride joined the duo's road band. In an interview with CMT, Dunn said, "They're amazingly tight as a group. I first heard them on the radio in the early '90s, shortly after their first single. I liked Terry's singing style. It had a familiar Texas twang." Dunn has also said that he enjoys writing with McBride, because both of them are Texas natives with a similar upbringing and musical influences.

The band's albums have received mixed reception from music critics. Entertainment Weekly reviewer Alanna Nash criticized the first two albums for lacking strong material outside of "Sacred Ground" (a ballad in which the male narrator tries to convince another man not to commit adultery on the narrator's wife), but gave Hurry Sundown a B rating, saying it was "filled with catchy hooks, tight hillbilly harmonies, soulful songs, and[…] a collective personality." Allmusic critic Jason Ankeny gave four-and-a-half stars out of five for both the second and third albums, noting of Hurry Sundown that it "continue[d] to hone the group's close-harmony style." Amarillo Sky received a three-star review from Allmusic critic Robert L. Doerschuk, who considered it "tight, seamless, [and] a bit impersonal", while About.com critic Matt Bjorke said it was a "wonderful collection of songs".

== Members ==
- Terry McBride – lead vocals, bass guitar (1989–1995, 2000–2002, 2021-present)
- Ray Herndon – background vocals, electric guitar (1989–1994, 2000–2002, 2021-present)
- Billy Thomas – background vocals, drums (1989–1994, 2000–2002, 2021-present)
- Keith Edwards – drums (1994–1995)
- Randy Frazier – bass guitar (1994–1995)
- Gary Morse – steel guitar (1994–1995)
- Jeff Roach – Keyboards (1994–1995)
- Kenny Vaughan – electric guitar (1994–1995)
- Bob Britt — lead guitar (1995)
- Rick Gerken — keyboards (1995)

== Discography ==
Studio albums

- Burnin' Up the Road (1990)
- Sacred Ground (1992)
- Hurry Sundown (1993)
- Terry McBride & the Ride (1994)
- Amarillo Sky (2002)

== Awards and nominations ==
=== TNN/Music City News Country Awards ===
Year	Nominee / work	Award	Result
1993	McBride & the Ride	Vocal Band of the Year	Nominated
1995	Terry McBride & the Ride	Vocal Group or Duo of Tomorrow	Nominated

=== Academy of Country Music Awards ===
Year	Nominee / work	Award	Result
1991	McBride & the Ride	Top New Vocal Group or Duet	Shortlisted
1992	McBride & the Ride	Top New Vocal Group or Duet	Nominated
1993	McBride & the Ride	Top Vocal Group of the Year	Nominated

=== Country Music Association Awards ===
Year	Nominee / work	Award	Result
1992	McBride & the Ride	Vocal Group of the Year	Nominated
