= Sacred Ground (song) =

1989 single by Kix Brooks

Single by Kix Brooks

from the album Kix Brooks
- B-side: "The Story of My Life"
- Released: 1989
- Genre: Country
- Length: 2:51
- Label: Capitol Nashville
- Songwriters: Kix Brooks, Vernon Rust
- Producers: Rafe Van Hoy; Kix Brooks

Kix Brooks singles chronology
"I'm on to You" (1988)	"Sacred Ground" (1989)	"She Does the Walk on By" (1989)

"Sacred Ground" is a country music song, co-written and originally recorded by American country music singer Kix Brooks, prior to his joining Ronnie Dunn in the duo Brooks & Dunn. Brooks' version was issued in 1989 as a single, and was included on his 1989 self-titled debut album.

A second version was recorded three years later by the American country music band McBride & the Ride. Released in 1992, that version would become the group's highest-charting hit, reaching a peak of #2 on the U.S. Billboard Hot Country Singles & Tracks (now Hot Country Songs) charts.

== Content ==
"Sacred Ground" is a mid-tempo ballad centralizing on a male narrator, who is talking to another man with whom it is implied that his wife had an emotional (and possibly physical) affair. In the first verse, the singer tells of how he married at an early age, and had to work various jobs to sustain his family. In the second chorus, he expresses his intention to reconcile with his wife and asks the other man to not interfere (possibly out of concern that the wife may continue the affair or at least not discourage his continued attention). He defends his relationship with his wife in the chorus: "We were joined in the eyes of the Lord in the eyes of our hometown / Why don't you leave her alone / You're treadin' on sacred ground".

== Kix Brooks version ==
Brooks' version was released in 1989. It was the second and final single from his debut album Kix Brooks, and it reached a peak of 87 on the Billboard Hot Country Singles charts. It was his last solo release before he founded Brooks & Dunn with Ronnie Dunn. Brooks did not chart another solo single until "New to This Town" in 2012.

=== Chart positions ===
Chart (1989)	Peak position
U.S. Billboard Hot Country Singles	87

== McBride & the Ride version ==
"Sacred Ground"

Single by McBride & the Ride

from the album Sacred Ground
- B-side: "Your One and Only"
- Released: March 2, 1992
- Genre: Country
- Length: 3:18
- Label: MCA
- Songwriters: Kix Brooks, Vernon Rust
- Producers: Steve Gibson; Tony Brown

McBride & the Ride singles chronology
"Same Old Star" (1991)	"Sacred Ground" (1992)	"Going Out of My Mind" (1992)

Three years after Brooks's version charted, McBride & the Ride recorded its own version of "Sacred Ground." It was released in March 1992 as the lead-off single to the band's second album, also titled Sacred Ground. The song reached a peak of #2 on the Billboard country charts (having been blocked from #1 by Billy Ray Cyrus' debut single "Achy Breaky Heart"), representing the band's highest chart peak.

=== Music video ===
The music video was directed by Bill Young and premiered in early 1992.

=== Chart positions ===
Chart (1992)	Peak position
Canada Country Singles (RPM)	2
US Hot Country Songs (Billboard)	2

=== Year-end charts ===
Chart (1992)	Position
Canada Country Tracks (RPM)	39
US Country Songs (Billboard)	44
