= Brooks & Dunn discography =

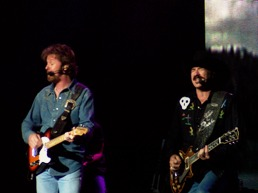
- Ronnie Dunn (left) and Kix Brooks.
- Studio albums: 13
- Extended plays: 1
- Compilation albums: 7
- Singles: 51
- Music videos: 40

Brooks & Dunn are an American country music duo composed of Kix Brooks and Ronnie Dunn. Signed to Arista Nashville, Brooks & Dunn has released 13 studio albums and seven compilation albums for the label. The duo has also charted 51 singles on the Billboard country charts, including 20 Number One hits. Two of their Number Ones have been declared by Billboard as the country single of the year: a cover of B.W. Stevenson's "My Maria" in 1996, and "Ain't Nothing 'bout You" (which is also their longest-lasting Number One, at six weeks) in 2001.

== Studio albums ==
=== 1990s ===
Title	Details	Peak positions				Certifications
Title	Details	US Country	US	CAN Country	CAN	Certifications
Brand New Man	Release date: August 13, 1991; Label: Arista Nashville; Formats: CD, cassette	3	10	5	—	RIAA: 7× Platinum; MC: 3× Platinum
Hard Workin' Man	Release date: February 23, 1993; Label: Arista Nashville; Formats: CD, cassette	2	9	1	41	RIAA: 5× Platinum; MC: 3× Platinum
Waitin' on Sundown	Release date: September 27, 1994; Label: Arista Nashville; Formats: CD, cassette	1	15	1	31	RIAA: 3× Platinum; MC: Platinum
Borderline	Release date: April 16, 1996; Label: Arista Nashville; Formats: CD, cassette	1	5	1	37	RIAA: 2× Platinum; MC: Gold
If You See Her	Release date: June 2, 1998; Label: Arista Nashville; Formats: CD, cassette	4	11	7	42	RIAA: 2× Platinum; MC: Gold
Tight Rope	Release date: September 21, 1999; Label: Arista Nashville; Formats: CD, cassette	6	31	6	—	RIAA: Gold
"—" denotes releases that did not chart

=== 2000s and 2010s ===
Title	Details	Peak positions			Certifications (sales threshold)
Title	Details	US Country	US	AUS	Certifications (sales threshold)
Steers & Stripes	Release date: April 17, 2001; Label: Arista Nashville; Formats: CD, cassette	1	4	—	RIAA: Platinum; MC: Platinum
It Won't Be Christmas Without You	Release date: October 8, 2002; Label: Arista Nashville; Formats: CD, download	12	81	—	MC: Platinum
Red Dirt Road	Release date: July 15, 2003; Label: Arista Nashville; Formats: CD, download	1	4	76	RIAA: Platinum; MC: Gold
Hillbilly Deluxe	Release date: August 30, 2005; Label: Arista Nashville; Formats: CD, download	1	3	79	RIAA: Platinum; MC: Gold
Cowboy Town	Release date: October 2, 2007; Label: Arista Nashville; Formats: CD, download	4	13	23	RIAA: Gold; ARIA: Gold
Reboot	Release date: April 5, 2019; Label: Arista Nashville; Formats: CD, vinyl, download, streaming	1	8	15	RIAA: Gold; MC: Gold
"—" denotes releases that did not chart

=== 2020s ===
Title	Details	Peak positions		
Title	Details	US	US Country	CAN
Reboot II	Release date: November 15, 2024; Label: Sony Music Nashville	25	5	61

== Compilation albums ==
Title	Details	Peak positions				Certifications
Title	Details	US Country	US	AUS	CAN	Certifications
The Greatest Hits Collection (Note: The Greatest Hits Collection peaked at number 1 on the RPM Country Albums chart in Canada.)	Release date: September 16, 1997; Label: Arista Nashville; Formats: CD, cassette	2	4	68	15	RIAA: 4× Platinum; ARIA: Platinum; MC: 2× Platinum
Super Hits	Release date: March 23, 1999; Label: Arista Nashville; Formats: CD, cassette	43	—	—	—	
The Greatest Hits Collection II	Release date: October 19, 2004; Label: Arista Nashville; Formats: CD, download	2	7	—	—	RIAA: Platinum
Playlist: The Very Best of Brooks & Dunn	Release date: December 2, 2008; Label: Arista Nashville; Formats: CD, download	48	—	—	—	ARIA: Gold
#1s… and Then Some	Release date: September 8, 2009; Label: Arista Nashville; Formats: CD, download	1	5	85	10	RIAA: Platinum
The Essential Brooks & Dunn	Release date: April 17, 2012; Label: Arista Nashville; Formats: CD, download	59	—	—	—	
	"—" denotes releases that did not chart					

== Singles ==
=== 1990s ===
Year	Single	Peak positions			Certifications	Album
Year	Single	US Country	US	CAN Country	Certifications	Album
1991	"Brand New Man"	1	—	1	RIAA: Platinum; RMNZ: Gold	Brand New Man
1991	"My Next Broken Heart"	1	—	3		Brand New Man
1992	"Neon Moon"	1	—	1	RIAA: 8× Platinum; RMNZ: 2× Platinum	Brand New Man
1992	"Boot Scootin' Boogie"	1	50	1	RIAA: 5× Platinum; MC: 4× Platinum; RMNZ: Platinum	Brand New Man
1992	"Lost and Found"	6	—	6		Brand New Man
1993	"Hard Workin' Man"	4	—	1	RIAA: Platinum	Hard Workin' Man
1993	"We'll Burn That Bridge"	2	—	1		Hard Workin' Man
1993	"She Used to Be Mine"	1	—	1	RIAA: Gold	Hard Workin' Man
1993	"Rock My World (Little Country Girl)"	2	97	1		Hard Workin' Man
1994	"That Ain't No Way to Go"	1	—	3	RIAA: Gold	Hard Workin' Man
1994	"She's Not the Cheatin' Kind"	1	—	1	RIAA: Platinum	Waitin' on Sundown
1994	"I'll Never Forgive My Heart"	6	—	2		Waitin' on Sundown
1995	"Little Miss Honky Tonk"	1	—	1		Waitin' on Sundown
1995	"You're Gonna Miss Me When I'm Gone"	1	—	1	RIAA: Platinum	Waitin' on Sundown
1995	"Whiskey Under the Bridge"	5	—	3		Waitin' on Sundown
1996	"My Maria"	1	79	1	RIAA: 3× Platinum; MC: 3× Platinum	Borderline
1996	"I Am That Man"	2	—	3		Borderline
1996	"Mama Don't Get Dressed Up for Nothing"	13	—	8		Borderline
1996	"A Man This Lonely"	1	— (Note: "A Man This Lonely" did not enter the Billboard Hot 100, but peaked at number 24 on Bubbling Under Hot 100 Singles.)	4		Borderline
1997	"Why Would I Say Goodbye"	8	—	9		Borderline
1997	"Honky Tonk Truth"	3	—	3		The Greatest Hits Collection
1997	"He's Got You"	2	—	3		The Greatest Hits Collection
1998	"If You See Him/If You See Her" (with Reba McEntire)	1	—	1	RIAA: Gold	If You See Her
1998	"How Long Gone"	1	—	1		If You See Her
1998	"Husbands and Wives"	1	36	2		If You See Her
1999	"I Can't Get Over You"	5	51	2		If You See Her
1999	"South of Santa Fe"	41	—	45		If You See Her
1999	"Missing You"	15	75	6		Tight Rope
1999	"Beer Thirty"	19	— (Note: "Beer Thirty" did not enter the Billboard Hot 100, but peaked at number 5 on Bubbling Under Hot 100 Singles.)	12		Tight Rope
"—" denotes releases that did not chart

=== 2000s-2020s ===
Year	Single	Peak positions				Certifications	Album
Year	Single	US Country	US	CAN Country (Note: Chart positions from RPM Country Tracks in 2000, Radio & Records from 2004 to 2005, and Canada Country from 2006 to present.)	CAN	Certifications	Album
2000	"You'll Always Be Loved by Me"	5	55	7	—		Tight Rope
2001	"Ain't Nothing 'bout You"	1	25	*	—	RIAA: 2× Platinum	Steers & Stripes
2001	"Only in America"	1	33	*	—	RIAA: Gold	Steers & Stripes
2001	"The Long Goodbye"	1	39	*	—		Steers & Stripes
2002	"My Heart Is Lost to You"	5	48	*	—		Steers & Stripes
2002	"Every River"	12	75	*	—		Steers & Stripes
2003	"Red Dirt Road"	1	25	*	—	RIAA: 3× Platinum; MC: 2× Platinum	Red Dirt Road
2003	"You Can't Take the Honky Tonk Out of the Girl"	3	39	*	—		Red Dirt Road
2004	"That's What She Gets for Loving Me"	6	53	2	—		Red Dirt Road
2004	"That's What It's All About"	2	38	2	—		The Greatest Hits Collection II
2004	"It's Getting Better All the Time"	1	56	3	—		The Greatest Hits Collection II
2005	"Play Something Country"	1	37	1	—	RIAA: Platinum	Hillbilly Deluxe
2005	"Believe"	8	60	21	—	RIAA: Platinum	Hillbilly Deluxe
2006	"Building Bridges" (with Sheryl Crow and Vince Gill)	4	66	2	—		Hillbilly Deluxe
2006	"Hillbilly Deluxe"	16	86	20	—	RIAA: Platinum	Hillbilly Deluxe
2007	"Proud of the House We Built"	4	57	1	60		Cowboy Town
2007	"God Must Be Busy"	11	78	11	92		Cowboy Town
2008	"Put a Girl in It"	3	54	1	62		Cowboy Town
2008	"Cowgirls Don't Cry" (with Reba McEntire) (Note: "Cowgirls Don't Cry" was re-released in November 2008 as a collaboration with Reba McEntire, and this version is only available on #1s… and Then Some.)	2	44	1	49	RIAA: 2× Platinum	Cowboy Town
2009	"Indian Summer"	16	— (Note: "Indian Summer" did not enter the Billboard Hot 100, but peaked at number 1 on Bubbling Under Hot 100 Singles.)	13	74		#1s… and Then Some
2009	"Honky Tonk Stomp" (with Billy Gibbons)	16	96	8	—		#1s… and Then Some
2019	"Brand New Man" (re-recording; with Luke Combs)	30	—	40	—	RIAA: Platinum; ARIA: Platinum; MC: 2× Platinum	Reboot
2024	"Believe" (re-recording; with Jelly Roll)	—	—	58	—		Reboot II
"—" denotes releases that did not chart "*" denotes releases where no chart existed at the time

=== As a featured artist ===
Year	Single	Peak positions					Certifications	Album
Year	Single	US Country	US Country Airplay	US	CAN Country	CAN	Certifications	Album
1994	"Corrine, Corrina" (Asleep at the Wheel with Brooks & Dunn)	73		—	—	—		Tribute to the Music of Bob Wills and the Texas Playboys
2002	"Words Are Your Wheels" (Phil Vassar with Brooks & Dunn, Kenny Chesney, Sara Evans, and Martina McBride)	—		—	—	—		—N/a
2016	"Forever Country" (as Artists of Then, Now & Forever)	1	33	21	34	25	RIAA: Gold	—N/a
"—" denotes releases that did not chart

== Other charted and certified songs ==
Year	Title	Peak positions		Certifications	Album
Year	Title	US	US Country	Certifications	Album
1994	"Ride 'Em High, Ride 'Em Low"	—	73		8 Seconds: Original Motion Picture Soundtrack
1999	"Against the Wind"	—	53		King of the Hill (soundtrack)
2000	"Goin' Under Gettin' over You"	—	60		Tight Rope
2002	"Hangin' 'Round the Mistletoe"	—	47		It Won't Be Christmas Without You
2002	"It Won't Be Christmas Without You"	—	41		It Won't Be Christmas Without You
2003	"Rockin' Little Christmas"	—	57		It Won't Be Christmas Without You
2003	"Winter Wonderland"	—	57		It Won't Be Christmas Without You
2007	"Cowboy Town"	—	56		Cowboy Town
2009	"Over the Next Hill" (with Mac Powell)	—	55		Billy: The Early Years (soundtrack)
2019	"Believe" (re-recording; with Kane Brown)	—	42		Reboot
2019	"Neon Moon" (re-recording; with Kacey Musgraves)	—	30	RIAA: Platinum; MC: 3× Platinum	Reboot
2019	"1, 2 Many" (with Luke Combs)	97	20	RIAA: 2× Platinum; ARIA: 2× Platinum; BPI: Silver; MC: Platinum; RMNZ: Platinum	What You See Is What You Get
2024	"Neon Moon" (re-recording; with Morgan Wallen)	97	24		Reboot II

== Music videos ==
Year	Title	Director
1991	"Brand New Man"	Michael Merriman
1991	"My Next Broken Heart"	Michael Merriman
1992	"Boot Scootin' Boogie"	Michael Merriman
1992	"Lost and Found"	Michael Merriman
1993	"Hard Workin' Man"	Sherman Halsey
1994	"Rock My World (Little Country Girl)"	Michael Parks
1994	"That Ain't No Way to Go"	Piers Plowden
1994	"She's Not the Cheatin' Kind"	Piers Plowden
1995	"Little Miss Honky Tonk"	Sherman Halsey
1995	"You're Gonna Miss Me When I'm Gone"	Michael Oblowitz
1996	"My Maria"	Michael Oblowitz
1996	"Mama Don't Get Dressed Up for Nothing"	Michael Oblowitz
1997	"A Man This Lonely"	Michael Oblowitz
1997	"Honky Tonk Truth"	Sherman Halsey
1997	"He's Got You"	Steven Goldmann
1998	"If You See Him/If You See Her" (with Reba McEntire)	Deaton-Flanigen
1998	"How Long Gone"	Steven Goldmann
1999	"South of Santa Fe"	Michael Merriman
1999	"Missing You"	Deaton-Flanigen
1999	"Beer Thirty"	Michael Merriman
2001	"Ain't Nothing 'bout You"	Trey Fanjoy
2001	"Only in America"	Michael Merriman
2002	"My Heart Is Lost to You"	Shaun Silva
2002	"It Won't Be Christmas Without You"	Jon Small
2003	"Red Dirt Road"	Steven Goldmann
2003	"You Can't Take the Honky Tonk Out of the Girl"	Michael Salomon
2004	"That's What It's All About"	Michael Salomon
2005	"Play Something Country"	Michael Salomon
2005	"Believe"	Deaton-Flanigen
2006	"Building Bridges"	Shaun Silva
2006	"Hillbilly Deluxe"	Michael Salomon
2007	"Proud of the House We Built"	Sam Erickson
2007	"God Must Be Busy" (Live from the 2007 CMA Awards)	Paul Miller
2008	"Put a Girl In It"	Wes Edwards
2008	"Cowgirls Don't Cry" (with Reba McEntire)	Deaton-Flanigen
2009	"Indian Summer"	Shaun Silva
2009	"Honky Tonk Stomp" (with Billy Gibbons)	Thien Phan
2016	"Forever Country" (as Artist of Then, Now & Forever)	Joseph Kahn
2019	"Brand New Man" (re-recording) (with Luke Combs)	Marty Callner
2019	"1, 2 Many" (with Luke Combs)	Dean Lent
