= Number 1s... and Then Some =

#1s... and Then Some

Compilation album by Brooks & Dunn
- Released: September 8, 2009
- Recorded: 1991–2009
- Genre: Country
- Length: Disc one: 55:54; Disc two: 56:42; Total time: 1:52:36
- Label: Arista Nashville
- Producer: Various original producers

Brooks & Dunn chronology
Playlist: The Very Best of Brooks & Dunn (2008)	#1s... and Then Some (2009)	Reboot (2019)

Singles from #1s... and Then Some
- 1. "Indian Summer" Released: May 25, 2009; 2. "Honky Tonk Stomp" Released: August 10, 2009

Professional ratings
Review scores
Source	Rating
AllMusic	4/5 stars
Country Weekly	4.5/5 stars
Roughstock	(favorable)

#1s... and Then Some is the title of a two-disc compilation album released on September 8, 2009, by country music duo Brooks & Dunn. It is the duo's fifth greatest hits package. The package contains two new tracks that were both released as singles, "Indian Summer" and a collaboration with ZZ Top lead guitarist Billy Gibbons, "Honky Tonk Stomp". It is their last release before their five-year hiatus from 2010 to 2015.

== Content ==
The album reprises 28 singles from the duo's previous studio albums, but does not contain any material from 1999's Tight Rope. It also features two new tracks, "Indian Summer" and "Honky Tonk Stomp," the latter of which features ZZ Top lead singer Billy Gibbons. Both of these new songs have been released to radio as singles.

== The Essential Brooks & Dunn ==
#1s... and Then Some was re-released and re-packaged on April 17, 2012, as The Essential Brooks & Dunn. Both albums have an identical track listing. The Essential Brooks & Dunn peaked at #59 on the U.S. Billboard Top Country Albums chart the week of May 12, 2012.

== Track listing ==
=== Disc 1 ===
1. "Honky Tonk Stomp" (Ronnie Dunn, Terry McBride, Bobby Pinson) – 3:01
  - feat. Billy Gibbons
  - previously unreleased
2. "Brand New Man" (Kix Brooks, Dunn, Don Cook) – 2:59
3. "Ain't Nothing 'bout You" (Tom Shapiro, Rivers Rutherford) – 3:22
4. "Hillbilly Deluxe" (Brad Crisler, Craig Wiseman) – 4:18
5. "How Long Gone" (Shawn Camp, John Scott Sherrill) – 3:40
6. "She's Not the Cheatin' Kind" (Dunn) – 3:27
7. "A Man This Lonely" (Dunn, Tommy Lee James) - 3:34
8. "Rock My World (Little Country Girl)" (Bill LaBounty, Steve O'Brien) – 3:42
9. "Red Dirt Road" (Brooks, Dunn) – 4:20
10. "The Long Goodbye" (Paul Brady, Ronan Keating) – 3:51
11. "You're Gonna Miss Me When I'm Gone" (Brooks, Dunn, Cook) – 4:52
12. "If You See Him/If You See Her" (McBride, James, Jennifer Kimball) – 3:58
  - feat. Reba McEntire
13. "She Used to Be Mine" (Dunn) – 3:56
14. "That Ain't No Way to Go" (Brooks, Dunn, Cook) – 3:37
15. "Boot Scootin' Boogie" (Dunn) – 3:18

=== Disc 2 ===
1. "Indian Summer" (Brooks, Dunn, Bob DiPiero) - 4:22
  - previously unreleased
2. "Play Something Country" (Dunn, McBride) – 3:14
3. "My Next Broken Heart" (Brooks, Dunn, Cook) – 2:56
4. "Cowgirls Don't Cry" (Dunn, McBride) - 3:41
  - feat. Reba McEntire
5. "Lost and Found" (Brooks, Cook) – 3:47
6. "Little Miss Honky Tonk" (Dunn) – 3:01
7. "It's Getting Better All the Time" (Cook, Ronnie Bowman)- 4:14
8. "We'll Burn That Bridge" (Dunn, Cook) – 2:56
9. "He's Got You" (Dunn, McBride) – 3:11
10. "Only in America" (Brooks, Dunn, Cook) – 4:29
11. "I Am That Man" (McBride, Monty Powell) - 4:09
12. "Husbands and Wives" (Roger Miller) – 3:10
13. "Neon Moon" (Dunn) – 4:21
14. "My Maria" (Daniel Moore, B. W. Stevenson) - 3:30
15. "Believe" (Dunn, Wiseman) – 5:39

== Personnel on new tracks ==
Brooks & Dunn

- Kix Brooks - background vocals
- Ronnie Dunn - lead vocals

Additional musicians

- Mark Casstevens - acoustic guitar
- J. T. Corenflos - electric guitar
- Shawn Fichter - drums
- Billy Gibbons - electric guitar and background vocals on "Honky Tonk Stomp"
- Kenny Greenberg - electric guitar
- Wes Hightower - background vocals
- Tim Lauer - keyboards
- Gary Morse - steel guitar
- Larry Paxton - bass guitar
- Bryan Sutton - electric guitar
- Lonnie Wilson - drums
- Glenn Worf - bass guitar

== Chart performance ==
=== Weekly charts ===
Chart (2009)	Peak position
Australian Albums (ARIA Charts)	85
Canadian Albums (Billboard)	10
US Billboard 200	5
US Top Country Albums (Billboard)	1

=== Year-end charts ===
Chart (2009)	Position
US Billboard 200	179
US Top Country Albums (Billboard)	38
Chart (2010)	Position
US Billboard 200	131
US Top Country Albums (Billboard)	20

== Certifications ==
Region	Certification	Certified units/sales
United States (RIAA)	Platinum	1,000,000^{^}
^{^} Shipments figures based on certification alone.
