= The Greatest Hits Collection (Brooks & Dunn album) =

Greatest hits album by Brooks & Dunn
- Released: September 16, 1997
- Genre: Country
- Length: 66:06
- Label: Arista Nashville
- Producer: Various

Brooks & Dunn chronology
Borderline (1996)	The Greatest Hits Collection (1997)	If You See Her (1998)

Singles from The Greatest Hits Collection
- 1. "Honky Tonk Truth" Released: August 25, 1997; 2. "He's Got You" Released: October 20, 1997

Professional ratings
Review scores
Source	Rating
AllMusic	4.5/5 stars

The Greatest Hits Collection is the first compilation album by American country music duo Brooks & Dunn. It was released in 1997 (see 1997 in country music) on Arista Nashville, and it chronicles the greatest hits from their first four studio albums: 1991's Brand New Man, 1993's Hard Workin' Man, 1994's Waitin' on Sundown, and 1996's Borderline. The album also includes three new tracks, two of which were released as singles: "Honky Tonk Truth" and "He's Got You", which respectively reached #3 and #2 on the Billboard Hot Country Singles & Tracks (now Hot Country Songs) charts. In 2004, a sequel, The Greatest Hits Collection II, was released.

The album was certified 4× Platinum by the RIAA on July 21, 2005. It has sold 4,608,400 copies in the United States as of April 2017.

== Track listing ==
No.	Title	Writer(s)	Length
1.	"My Maria"	B.W. Stevenson, Daniel Moore	3:28
2.	"Honky Tonk Truth"	Ronnie Dunn, Lonnie Wilson, Kim Williams	3:14^{A}
3.	"You're Gonna Miss Me When I'm Gone"	Kix Brooks, Don Cook, Dunn	4:52
4.	"Boot Scootin' Boogie"	Dunn	3:17
5.	"He's Got You"	Dunn, Terry McBride	3:11^{A}
6.	"Hard Workin' Man"	Dunn	2:57
7.	"That Ain't No Way to Go"	Brooks, Dunn, Cook	3:37
8.	"Rock My World (Little Country Girl)"	Steve O'Brien, Bill LaBounty	3:42
9.	"Neon Moon"	Dunn	4:21
10.	"Lost and Found"	Brooks, Cook	3:47
11.	"She's Not the Cheatin' Kind"	Dunn	3:25
12.	"Brand New Man"	Brooks, Dunn, Cook	2:59
13.	"Days of Thunder"	Brooks, Paul Nelson	3:30^{B}
14.	"We'll Burn That Bridge"	Dunn, Cook	2:56
15.	"She Used to Be Mine"	Dunn	3:55
16.	"Mama Don't Get Dressed Up for Nothing"	Brooks, Dunn, Cook	4:06
17.	"My Next Broken Heart"	Brooks, Dunn, Cook	2:55
18.	"Whiskey Under the Bridge"	Brooks, Dunn, Cook	2:53
19.	"Little Miss Honky Tonk"	Dunn	3:01

- ^{A}Newly recorded tracks.
- ^{B}Previously Unreleased

== Personnel on new tracks ==
Compiled from the liner notes.

Brooks & Dunn

- Kix Brooks – lead vocals on "Days of Thunder", background vocals
- Ronnie Dunn – lead vocals on "Honky Tonk Truth" and "He's Got You", background vocals

Additional musicians

- Bruce Bouton – steel guitar
- Dennis Burnside – Hammond organ
- Steve Gibson – acoustic guitar
- Rob Hajacos – fiddle
- Wes Hightower – background vocals
- David Hungate – bass guitar
- John Barlow Jarvis – piano
- Liana Manis – background vocals
- Brent Mason – electric guitar
- Terry McBride – background vocals
- John Wesley Ryles – background vocals
- Lonnie Wilson – drums, percussion

== Chart performance ==
=== Weekly charts ===
Chart (1997)	Peak position
Australian Albums (ARIA Charts)	68
Canadian Albums (RPM)	15
Canadian Country Albums (RPM)	1
US Billboard 200	4
US Top Country Albums (Billboard)	2
Chart (2019)	Peak position
Australian Digital Albums (ARIA)	40

=== Year-end charts ===
Chart (1997)	Position
US Billboard 200	102
US Top Country Albums (Billboard)	12
Chart (1998)	Position
US Billboard 200	54
US Top Country Albums (Billboard)	7
Chart (1999)	Position
US Top Country Albums (Billboard)	22
Chart (2001)	Position
Canadian Country Albums (Nielsen SoundScan)	33
Chart (2002)	Position
Canadian Country Albums (Nielsen SoundScan)	35
Chart (2018)	Position
US Top Country Albums (Billboard)	97
Chart (2021)	Position
US Top Country Albums (Billboard)	24
Chart (2022)	Position
US Top Country Albums (Billboard)	21
Chart (2023)	Position
US Top Country Albums (Billboard)	32
Chart (2024)	Position
US Top Country Albums (Billboard)	38
Chart (2025)	Position
US Top Country Albums (Billboard)	32

== Certifications ==
Region	Certification	Certified units/sales
Australia (ARIA)	Platinum	70,000^{^}
Canada (Music Canada)	2× Platinum	200,000^{^}
United States (RIAA)	4× Platinum	4,000,000^{^}
^{^} Shipments figures based on certification alone.
