= Playlist: The Very Best of Brooks & Dunn =

Greatest hits album by Brooks & Dunn
- Released: December 2, 2008
- Genre: Country
- Length: 57:59
- Label: Arista
- Producer: Various

Brooks & Dunn chronology
Cowboy Town (2007)	Playlist: The Very Best of Brooks & Dunn (2008)	#1s… and Then Some (2009)

Professional ratings
Review scores
Source	Rating
InMusic	3/5 stars

Playlist: The Very Best of Brooks & Dunn is a 2008 compilation album by Brooks & Dunn. It is part of a series of similar Playlist albums issued by Sony BMG, the parent company of Brooks & Dunn's label, Arista Nashville. The album features 10 of Brooks & Dunn's singles. "Best of My Love" was originally included on Common Thread: The Songs of the Eagles, "Against the Wind" on the King of the Hill soundtrack and "I Ain't Living Long Like This" on I've Always Been Crazy: A Tribute to Waylon Jennings, while "The Fightin' Side of Me" was previously unissued. "Only in America" is a live performance from Farm Aid 2003.

== Critical reception ==
Playlist: The Very Best of Brooks & Dunn received three out of five stars from InMusic. The author wrote that "this greatest hits compilation is filled with the Brooks & Dunn tracks that have made the country duo a staple among new country enthusiasts."

== Commercial performance ==
Playlist: The Very Best of Brooks & Dunn peaked at No. 48 on the U.S. Billboard Top Country Albums chart the week of January 24, 2009.

== Track listing ==
No.	Title	Writer(s)	Length
1.	"Boot Scootin' Boogie"	Ronnie Dunn	3:19
2.	"Lost and Found"	Kix Brooks, Don Cook	3:48
3.	"Hard Workin' Man"	Dunn	2:58
4.	"Best of My Love"	Glenn Frey, Don Henley, JD Souther	4:37
5.	"That Ain't No Way to Go"	Brooks, Dunn, Cook	3:37
6.	"You're Gonna Miss Me When I'm Gone"	Brooks, Dunn, Cook	4:51
7.	"My Maria"	B.W. Stevenson, Daniel Moore	3:29
8.	"Against the Wind"	Bob Seger	4:59
9.	"Ain't Nothing 'Bout You"	Tom Shapiro, Rivers Rutherford	3:37
10.	"My Heart Is Lost to You"	Brett Beavers, Connie Harrington	3:00
11.	"I Ain't Living Long Like This"	Rodney Crowell	4:27
12.	"You Can't Take the Honky Tonk Out of the Girl"	Bob DiPiero, Bart Allmand	3:43
13.	"Only in America"	Brooks, Ronnie Rogers, Cook	5:00
14.	"The Fightin' Side of Me"	Merle Haggard	4:02

== Charts ==
Chart (2008)	Peak position
US Top Country Albums (Billboard)	48

== Certifications ==
Region	Certification	Certified units/sales
Australia (ARIA)	Gold	35,000^{^}
^{^} Shipments figures based on certification alone.
