= Super Hits (Brooks & Dunn album) =

Greatest hits album by Brooks & Dunn
- Released: March 23, 1999
- Genre: Country
- Length: 35:07
- Label: Arista
- Producer: Kix Brooks; Don Cook; Ronnie Dunn; Scott Hendricks

Brooks & Dunn chronology
If You See Her (1998)	Super Hits (1999)	Tight Rope (1999)

Super Hits is a 1999 compilation album by Brooks & Dunn. It is part of a series of similar Super Hits albums issued by Sony BMG, the parent company of Brooks & Dunn's label, Arista Nashville.

It is also one of two albums not to feature the duo's signature longhorn skull emblem on the cover.

== Track listing ==
No.	Title	Writer(s)	Length
1.	"Neon Moon"	Ronnie Dunn	4:21
2.	"Rock My World (Little Country Girl)"	Steve O'Brien, Bill LaBounty	3:42
3.	"A Man This Lonely"	Dunn, Tommy Lee James	3:34
4.	"You're Gonna Miss Me When I'm Gone"	Kix Brooks, Don Cook, Dunn	4:52
5.	"If That's the Way You Want It"	Cook, Brooks, Dunn	3:43
6.	"Cool Drink of Water"	Brooks, Cook	3:05
7.	"I Can't Put Out This Fire"	Brooks, Dunn	3:38
8.	"Our Time Is Coming"	Brooks, Dunn	4:37
9.	"White Line Casanova"	Dunn	3:35

== Critical reception ==
Professional ratings
Review scores
Source	Rating
Allmusic	3/5 stars

Super Hits received three out of five stars from Stephen Thomas Erlewine of Allmusic. Erlewine concludes that the album is "entertaining," although most fans would be "better-served by the definitive Greatest Hits."

== Chart performance ==
Super Hits peaked at #43 on the U.S. Billboard Top Country Albums chart.

Chart (1999)	Peak position
U.S. Billboard Top Country Albums	43
