= Borderline (Brooks & Dunn album) =

Studio album by Brooks & Dunn
- Released: April 16, 1996
- Genre: Country
- Length: 39:37
- Label: Arista Nashville
- Producers: Kix Brooks; Don Cook; Ronnie Dunn

Brooks & Dunn chronology
Waitin' on Sundown (1994)	Borderline (1996)	The Greatest Hits Collection (1997)

Singles from Borderline
- 1. "My Maria" Released: March 24, 1996; 2. "I Am That Man" Released: June 3, 1996; 3. "Mama Don't Get Dressed Up for Nothing" Released: September 2, 1996; 4. "A Man This Lonely" Released: December 9, 1996; 5. "Why Would I Say Goodbye" Released: March 17, 1997

Professional ratings
Review scores
Source	Rating
AllMusic	2/5 stars

Borderline is the fourth studio album by American country music duo Brooks & Dunn. Released on April 16, 1996, by Arista Records, the album produced five singles on the Hot Country Songs charts for the duo: the Number One hit "My Maria" (a cover of a pop tune originally recorded by B. W. Stevenson), the #2 "I Am That Man", the #13 "Mama Don't Get Dressed Up for Nothing" (their first non-Top 10 single), another #1 in "A Man This Lonely", and finally "Why Would I Say Goodbye" at #8. Borderline was certified 2× Platinum by the RIAA.

The song "My Love Will Follow You" was originally recorded by Buddy Miller on his 1995 album Your Love and Other Lies. Borderline was nominated at the 39th Grammy Awards for Best Country Album.

== Track listing ==
No.	Title	Writer(s)	Length
1.	"My Maria"	Daniel Moore; B. W. Stevenson	3:30
2.	"A Man This Lonely"	Ronnie Dunn; Tommy Lee James	3:34
3.	"Why Would I Say Goodbye"	Kix Brooks; Chris Waters	4:18
4.	"Mama Don't Get Dressed Up for Nothing"	Brooks; Dunn; Don Cook	4:07
5.	"I Am That Man"	Terry McBride; Monty Powell	4:09
6.	"More Than a Margarita"	Brooks; Waters	3:22
7.	"Redneck Rhythm & Blues"	Dunn; Kim Williams; Lonnie Wilson	2:51
8.	"My Love Will Follow You"	Buddy Miller; Julie Miller	3:41
9.	"One Heartache at a Time"	Brooks; Tony King	3:04
10.	"Tequila Town"	Brooks; Dunn	3:13
11.	"White Line Casanova"	Dunn	3:35
Total length:			39:37

== Charts ==
=== Weekly charts ===
Chart (1996)	Peak position
Canadian Albums (RPM)	37
Canadian Country Albums (RPM)	1
US Billboard 200	5
US Top Country Albums (Billboard)	1

=== Year-end charts ===
Chart (1996)	Position
US Billboard 200	37
US Top Country Albums (Billboard)	5

Chart (1997)	Position
US Billboard 200	103
US Top Country Albums (Billboard)	11

== Certifications ==
Region	Certification	Certified units/sales
Canada (Music Canada)	Gold	50,000^{^}
United States (RIAA)	2× Platinum	2,000,000^{^}
^{^} Shipments figures based on certification alone.

== Personnel ==
Brooks & Dunn

- Kix Brooks – lead vocals, background vocals
- Ronnie Dunn – lead vocals, background vocals

Additional musicians

- Bruce Bouton – pedal steel guitar, slide guitar
- Dennis Burnside – piano, keyboards, Hammond B-3 organ
- Mark Casstevens – acoustic guitar, hi-string guitar, mandolin
- Rob Hajacos – fiddle, "assorted hoedown tools"
- David Hungate – bass guitar
- Brent Mason – electric guitar
- Michael Rhodes – bass guitar
- Tom Roady – percussion
- John Wesley Ryles – background vocals
- Dennis Wilson – background vocals
- Lonnie Wilson – drums, percussion
- Glenn Worf – bass guitar
