= Beer Thirty =

Single by Brooks & Dunn

from the album Tight Rope
- Released: October 25, 1999
- Recorded: 1999
- Genre: Country
- Length: 2:36
- Label: Arista Nashville
- Songwriters: Ronnie Dunn; Terry McBride
- Producers: Byron Gallimore; Kix Brooks; Ronnie Dunn

Brooks & Dunn singles chronology
"Missing You" (1999)	"Beer Thirty" (1999)	"You'll Always Be Loved by Me" (2000)

"Beer Thirty" is a song written by Ronnie Dunn and Terry McBride, and recorded by American country music duo Brooks & Dunn. It was released in October 1999 as the second single from the album Tight Rope. The song reached #19 on the Billboard Hot Country Singles & Tracks chart.

== Chart performance ==
Chart (1999–2000)	Peak position
Canada Country Singles (RPM)	12
US Bubbling Under Hot 100 (Billboard)	5
US Hot Country Songs (Billboard)	19
