= Cowgirls Don't Cry =

Single by Brooks & Dunn featuring Reba McEntire

from the album Cowboy Town
- Released: October 20, 2008
- Genre: Country
- Length: 3:33
- Label: Arista Nashville 88697-43591
- Songwriters: Ronnie Dunn; Terry McBride
- Producers: Kix Brooks; Tony Brown; Ronnie Dunn

Brooks & Dunn singles chronology
"Put a Girl in It" (2008)	"Cowgirls Don't Cry" (2008)	"Indian Summer" (2009)

Reba McEntire singles chronology
"Every Other Weekend" (2008)	"Cowgirls Don't Cry" (2008)	"Strange" (2009)

"Cowgirls Don't Cry" is a song written by Ronnie Dunn and Terry McBride of McBride & the Ride and recorded by American country music duo Brooks & Dunn. It was released in October 2008 as the fourth and final single on their studio album Cowboy Town. One month after its chart entry, it was re-recorded and re-released as a duet with Reba McEntire. The song is Brooks & Dunn's 41st and most recent Top 10 hit on the Billboard country charts and McEntire's 56th.

== Content ==
"Cowgirls Don't Cry" is a mid-tempo with a fiddle intro. Its lyric focuses on a female character who faces hardship. In the first verse, she is a little girl who has just been given a pony to ride, and although she repeatedly falls off, she does not cry. By the second verse, she is an adult, and her husband is having an affair, although again she does not cry. She discovers in the third verse that her father is dying, after her mother calls her and puts him on the line. He then tells her, "Cowgirl, don't cry".

== Re-release ==
An alternate version of this song that features Reba McEntire's vocals on the final chorus was released to radio after she and the duo performed the song on the Country Music Association Awards on Wednesday, November 12, 2008. In addition, a video was released that featured both the duo and McEntire. Starting with the chart week of November 29, 2008, the song was credited on the U.S. country charts as "Brooks & Dunn featuring Reba McEntire". The Reba McEntire collaboration was officially released as a digital single on February 10, 2009. The duet version features a key change in the final chorus, which is not present in the original recording. This re-release is the version that appears on the compilation album #1s… and Then Some.

== Chart performance ==
On the chart week of January 31, 2009, the song entered Top Ten on the Billboard country singles charts, giving Brooks & Dunn their forty-first Top Ten hit and breaking a record previously held by Alabama for the most Top Ten country hits by a duo or group. In addition, it became McEntire's fifty-sixth Top Ten country hit, breaking Dolly Parton's record for the most Top Ten country hits for a solo female.

Chart (2008–2009)	Peak position
US Hot Country Songs (Billboard)	2
US Billboard Hot 100	44
Canada Country (Billboard)	1
Canada Hot 100 (Billboard)	49

=== Year-end charts ===
Annual chart rankings
Chart (2009)	Position
US Country Songs (Billboard)	16
US Radio Songs (Billboard)	90

== Certifications ==
Region	Certification	Certified units/sales
United States (RIAA)	2× Platinum	2,000,000^{‡}
^{‡} Sales+streaming figures based on certification alone.
