= Brooks & Dunn =

American country music duo

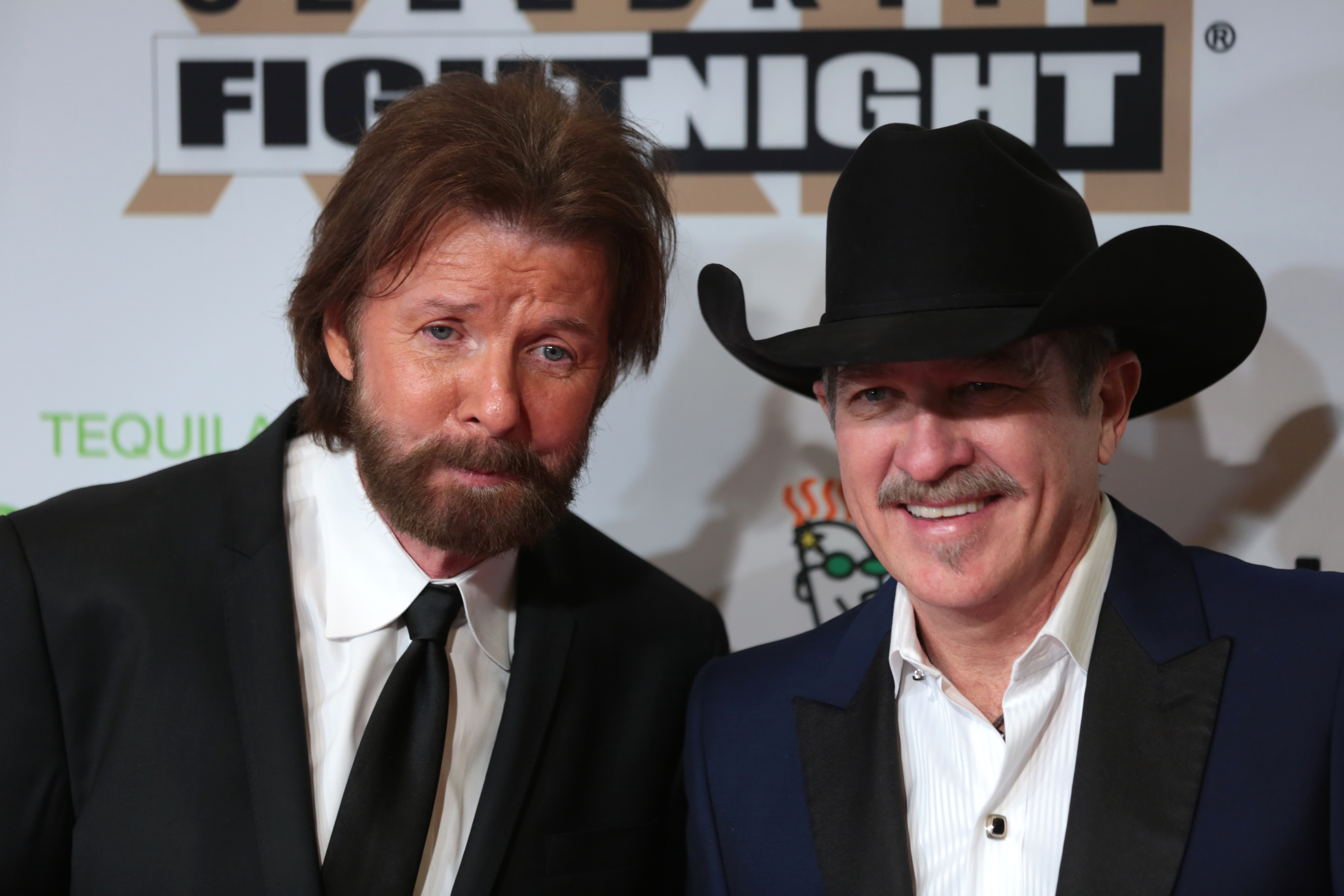
- Ronnie Dunn (left) and Kix Brooks (right) in March 2017

Background information
- Origin: Nashville, Tennessee, U.S.
- Genre: Neotraditional country
- Works: Brooks & Dunn discography
- Years active: 1988–2010; 2014–present
- Label: Arista Nashville/Sony Music Nashville
- Members: Kix Brooks; Ronnie Dunn
- Website: Brooks-Dunn.com

Brooks & Dunn are an American country music duo consisting of Kix Brooks and Ronnie Dunn, both of whom are vocalists and songwriters. The duo was founded in 1990 through the suggestion of songwriter and record producer, Tim DuBois. Before their formation, both members were solo recording artists, having each charted two solo singles in the 1980s. Kix Brooks also released an album for Capitol Records in 1989 and wrote hit singles for other artists.

The duo signed to Arista Nashville after their formation. They have recorded eleven studio albums, one Christmas album, and five compilation albums for the label. They also have released 50 singles, of which 20 went to number one on the Hot Country Songs charts and 19 more reached top 10. Two of these number-one songs, "My Maria" (a posthumous cover of the 1973 B. W. Stevenson hit) and "Ain't Nothing 'bout You", were the top country songs of 1996 and 2001, respectively, according to the Billboard Year-End charts. The latter is also the duo's longest-lasting number-one single on that chart at six weeks. Several of their songs have also reached the Billboard Hot 100, with the number-25 peaks of "Ain't Nothing 'bout You" and "Red Dirt Road" being their highest there. Brooks and Dunn also hold the record for most Country Music Association Awards wins in history, with twenty, including the top honor Entertainer of the Year in 1996. They received the Willie Nelson Lifetime Achievement Award at the ceremony in 2026. Two of their songs won the Grammy Award for Best Country Performance by a Duo or Group with Vocal: "Hard Workin' Man" in 1994 and "My Maria" in 1996. All but two of the duo's studio albums are certified platinum or higher by the Recording Industry Association of America; their highest-certified is their 1991 debut album, Brand New Man, which is certified sextuple-platinum for shipments of six million copies.

The duo's material is known for containing influences of honky-tonk, mainstream country, and rock, as well as the contrast between their singing voices and on-stage personalities, although some of their music has also been criticized as formulaic. Their 1992 single "Boot Scootin' Boogie" helped repopularize line dancing in the United States, and 2001's "Only in America" was used by both George W. Bush and Barack Obama in their respective presidential campaigns. Brooks and Dunn have collaborated with several artists, including Reba McEntire, Vince Gill, Sheryl Crow, Mac Powell, Billy Gibbons, Jerry Jeff Walker, and Luke Combs.

After announcing their retirement in August 2009, they performed their final concert on September 2, 2010, at the Bridgestone Arena in Nashville, Tennessee. Both Brooks and Dunn have continued to record for Arista Nashville as solo artists. Dunn released a self-titled album in 2011, which included the top-10 country hit "Bleed Red", while Brooks released New to This Town in September 2012. The duo reunited in 2015 for a series of concerts with Reba McEntire in Las Vegas. In 2019, the duo was inducted into the Country Music Hall of Fame.

== History ==
=== Kix Brooks ===
Leon Eric "Kix" Brooks III was born on May 12, 1955, in Shreveport, Louisiana, and before moving to Nashville, Tennessee, in 1976, he played at various venues in Maine. He was also a neighbor of country singer Johnny Horton. Brooks worked as a songwriter in the 1980s, co-writing the number-one singles "I'm Only in It for the Love" by John Conlee, "Modern Day Romance" by the Nitty Gritty Dirt Band, and "Who's Lonely Now" by Highway 101, plus The Oak Ridge Boys' Top 20 hit "You Made a Rock of a Rolling Stone", Nicolette Larson's "Let Me Be the First", and Keith Palmer's "Don't Throw Me in the Briarpatch". Brooks also released several singles through the independent Avion label, charting at No. 73 on Hot Country Songs in 1983 with "Baby, When Your Heart Breaks Down". In 1989, he released a self-titled studio album through Capitol Records. This album included "Baby, When Your Heart Breaks Down" and "Sacred Ground", which McBride & the Ride covered and took to No. 2 on the country charts in 1992. Brooks and Pam Tillis co-wrote and sang on "Tomorrow's World", a multi-artist single released on Warner Bros. Records in 1990 in honor of Earth Day. Brooks also co-produced and co-wrote "Backbone Job", a Keith Whitley outtake that appeared on his 1991 compilation album, Kentucky Bluebird.

=== Ronnie Dunn ===
Ronnie Gene Dunn was born on June 1, 1953, in Coleman, Texas. He played bass guitar in local bands during high school, and he briefly studied theology at Hardin-Simmons University with the intention of becoming a Baptist preacher. Dunn was "kicked out" of the school because he played in bars. Between 1983 and 1984, he recorded for the Churchill label, taking both "It's Written All Over Your Face" and "She Put the Sad in All His Songs" to number 59 on the country charts. In 1988, session drummer Jamie Oldaker entered Dunn in a talent contest sponsored by Marlboro, which he won. The grand prize in the competition included a recording session in Nashville, Tennessee. The producer of that session, Scott Hendricks, recommended Dunn's recordings to Tim DuBois, then an executive of Arista Nashville. DuBois paired Brooks and Dunn because he thought that they would work well together as songwriters, and after the two recorded a demo, he suggested that they form a duo. During this timespan, Dunn also wrote "Boot Scootin' Boogie", which Asleep at the Wheel recorded on their 1990 album, Keepin' Me Up Nights.

== Musical career ==
=== Brand New Man ===
Brooks and Dunn's first single, "Brand New Man", entered the Hot Country Songs charts in June 1991 and went to number one. It was the title track to the duo's debut album, Brand New Man, which was released two months later. Brooks and Dunn wrote this song and several other cuts in collaboration with songwriter Don Cook, who co-produced the album with Hendricks. It was also Cook's first credit as a producer. The next three single releases from Brand New Man ("My Next Broken Heart", "Neon Moon", and their own rendition of "Boot Scootin' Boogie") all made number one on the country music charts, as well, making for the first time in country-music history that a duo or group had sent its first four singles to the top of the charts. A fifth single, "Lost and Found", peaked at number six. "Boot Scootin' Boogie", which had previously been the B-side to "My Next Broken Heart", also made number 50 on the Billboard Hot 100, and its commercial success led to a renewed interest in line dancing throughout the United States. Brand New Man was certified platinum by the Recording Industry Association of America in August 1992 for shipments of one million copies; by 2002, the album had been certified sextuple-platinum for shipments of six million. It spent more than 190 weeks on the Top Country Albums charts. In 1992, the duo won the Duo of the Year Award from the Country Music Association, which also nominated them for that year's Album of the Year and Horizon awards. Brooks and Dunn won the association's Duo award for every year from then until 2006, except for 2000, when the award went to Montgomery Gentry. After the album's release, Brooks & Dunn began touring as well.

Brand New Man received a positive review from AllMusic, whose critic Daniel Gioffre thought that the album showed the duo's diversity of musical influences. Alanna Nash of Entertainment Weekly was less positive, criticizing the duo's sound for being "imitative".

=== Hard Workin' Man and Waitin' on Sundown ===
Hard Workin' Man was the title of Brooks and Dunn's second album, which was released in 1993. The title track, also its first single, peaked at number four on the country music charts. The album included two number-one singles in its third and fifth releases: "She Used to Be Mine" and its B-side, "That Ain't No Way to Go". "We'll Burn That Bridge" and "Rock My World (Little Country Girl)" (respectively the second and fourth releases) both made top five on Billboard, with the former reaching number one on Radio & Records. Also included on the album was a remix of "Boot Scootin' Boogie". In 1994, "Hard Workin' Man" won the duo a Grammy Award for Best Country Performance by a Duo or Group with Vocal, and the album was nominated for Best Country Album. Hard Workin' Man earned its highest RIAA certification in 2002, when it was certified quintuple platinum. Brian Mansfield gave a generally positive review in Allmusic, saying that its up-tempo songs "rocked harder" than any of the songs from the first album.

By the end of 1994, the duo released their third studio album, Waitin' on Sundown. It also produced five charting singles, three of which made number one on the country charts: "She's Not the Cheatin' Kind", "Little Miss Honky Tonk", and "You're Gonna Miss Me When I'm Gone". The other two singles, "I'll Never Forgive My Heart" and "Whiskey Under the Bridge", both made top 10. Allmusic critic Thom Owens thought that the album's singles were "solid", but that the rest of the songs were "filler". A review of the single "She's Not the Cheatin' Kind" from the same site praised it for its "hard-driving, honky-tonk spirit". Nash praised the honky-tonk sound of "I'll Never Forgive My Heart", but thought that most of the other songs relied on "contrivance". Randy Lewis of the Orlando Sentinel gave a generally positive review, saying that the "minidrama" of "A Few Good Rides Away" (which Brooks co-wrote) was the strongest track on the album.

=== Borderline ===
The first single from Brooks and Dunn's fourth album, Borderline, was a cover version of B.W. Stevenson's 1973 single "My Maria". Their version of the song spent three weeks at number one in mid-1996 and peaked at number 79 on the Billboard Hot 100; it was also that year's top country song according to the Billboard Year-End charts. Dunn said that he was initially reluctant to record "My Maria" because the duo had not previously recorded any cover songs. The song won Brooks and Dunn its second Grammy Award for Best Country Performance by a Group or Duo, and the duo won the 1996 Entertainer of the Year award from both the Country Music Association and Academy of Country Music, making them the first duo to win that award from the former. In 1997, Brooks & Dunn joined a double-headliner tour with Reba McEntire. Borderline produced another number one in "A Man This Lonely", along with the top-10 hits "I Am That Man" and "Why Would I Say Goodbye". "Mama Don't Get Dressed Up for Nothing", the third single and B-side to "My Maria", became their first release not to make the top 10.

Michael McCall of Allmusic and Alanna Nash of Entertainment Weekly both thought that the album's material was "cliché" and that "My Maria" was the strongest song on it. A more positive review came from Larry Stephens of Country Standard Time, who thought that the album had "the right mix" of songs.

=== The Greatest Hits Collection and If You See Her ===
Their first greatest hits compilation was released on September 16, 1997. It comprised most of their singles to that point and three new songs: "Honky Tonk Truth", "He's Got You", and "Days of Thunder". The first two were released as singles, with respective peaks of three and two on the country charts. The Greatest Hits Collection was certified platinum in April 1998, and double-platinum in 2001.

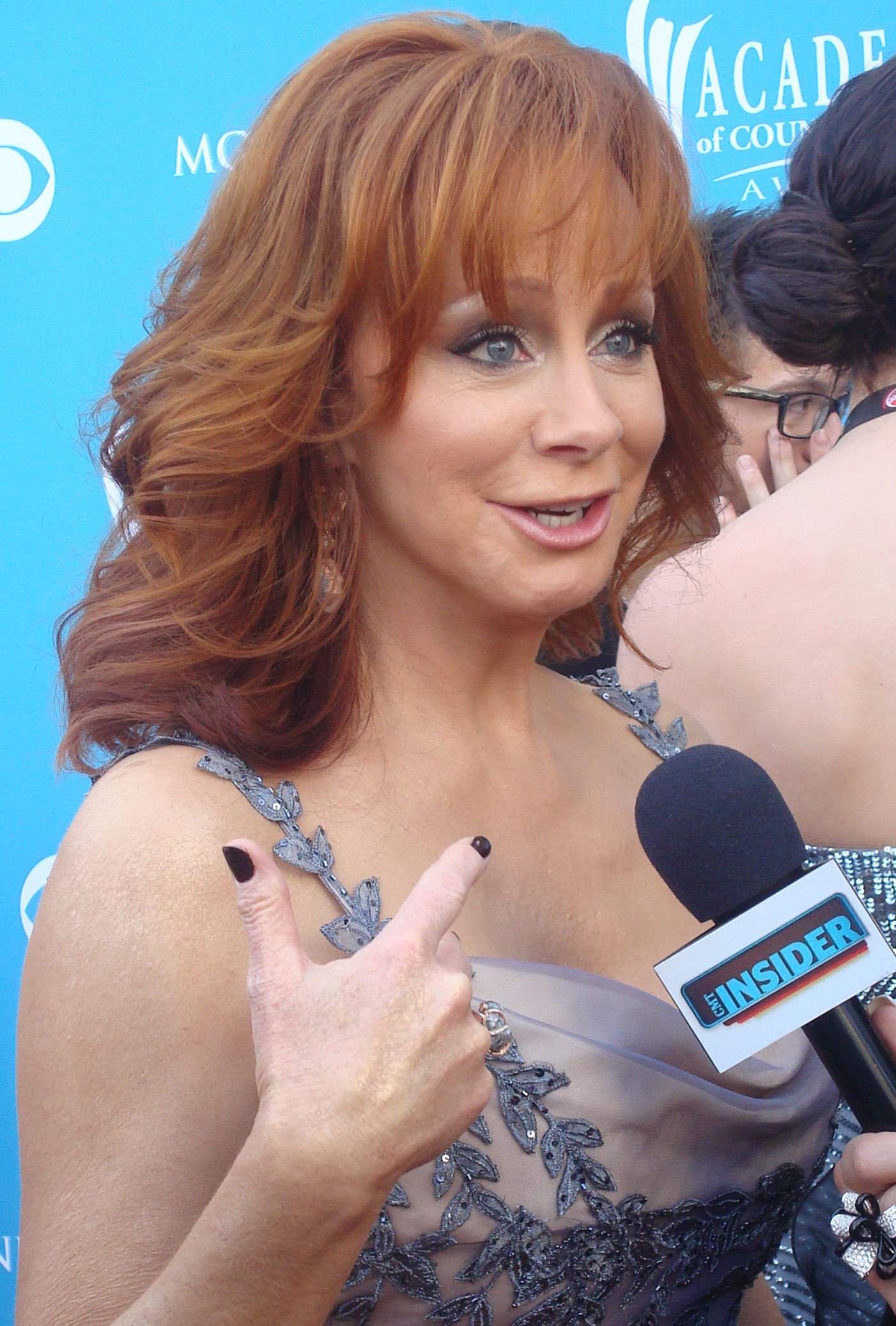
Brooks and Dunn recorded "If You See Him/If You See Her" with Reba McEntire, who later provided a guest vocal on a re-release of the duo's 2008 single "Cowgirls Don't Cry".

Brooks & Dunn collaborated with Reba McEntire to perform "If You See Him/If You See Her", which was the lead-off single to Brooks and Dunn's If You See Her and McEntire's If You See Him, both of which were released on the same day. Arista Nashville and MCA Nashville, the label to which McEntire was signed, both promoted the single. This cut went to number one, as did If You See Her's next two singles: "How Long Gone" and a cover of Roger Miller's "Husbands and Wives", which also became the duo's first top-40 hit on the Billboard Hot 100. Dunn recorded the vocals for "Husbands and Wives" in one take. Also included on the album was a cover of Mark Collie's "Born and Raised in Black and White", the first song of the duo's career in which they alternated on lead vocals. The album's fourth single was "I Can't Get Over You", which was a top-five country hit. Following it was "South of Santa Fe", which peaked at number 41 on the country charts, thus becoming the duo's lowest-peaking single there. In 2001, If You See Her reached double-platinum certification in the United States.

Jana Pendragon, in her review for Allmusic, praised Dunn's vocal performances on "Husbands and Wives" and "You're My Angel", but thought that a couple of the other cuts were "formula". Country Standard Time writer Kevin Oliver criticized the album for having "wildly uneven" material, calling the McEntire collaboration a "snoozer" and "South of Santa Fe" "wretched".

=== Tight Rope ===
Tight Rope (1999), the duo's sixth album, was also its least commercially successful release. It included three singles: a cover of John Waite's "Missing You", followed by "Beer Thirty" and "You'll Always Be Loved By Me". The former two failed to make top 10, while the latter peaked at number five in 2000. Dunn co-wrote some songs on this album with McBride & the Ride lead singer and bassist Terry McBride (who would later join Brooks & Dunn's road band), and Brooks collaborated with Bob DiPiero. The duo shared production duties with Byron Gallimore on all three singles and four other songs on the album, while retaining Cook as producer on the other six. While "Beer Thirty" was climbing, the album cut "Goin' Under Gettin' Over You" charted as high as number 60 based on unsolicited airplay. Tight Rope was certified gold for U.S. shipments of 500,000 copies, but did not receive any higher certification. Likely due to its performance, the duo has not featured any material from this album on their compilations.

Stephen Thomas Erlewine gave this album a mixed review, referring to the "Missing You" cover as a "misstep". Jon Weisberger thought that the album was "consistent" but added that it did not have any "surprises". Brooks revealed in 2015 that the album's poor performance almost led to the duo splitting up, as he felt, "We weren't really writing together anymore, and we were just kind of done", but they ultimately stayed together at the suggestion of Joe Galante, then the head of their label.

=== Steers & Stripes ===
In addition to persuading the duo to stay together, Galante suggested that they record the song "Ain't Nothing 'Bout You", because he felt it had potential as a hit. The song served as the lead single from their seventh album, 2001's Steers & Stripes. It became their longest-lasting number one, with a six-week stay at that position. This song was the second song of the duo's career to be named the top single of the year according to Billboard Year-End; it was also their highest peak on the Billboard Hot 100 at the time, peaking at number 25 there. For this album, the duo worked with producer Mark Wright, who also produced for Lee Ann Womack and Gary Allan at the time.

The next two singles from Steers & Stripes both made number one, as well: "Only in America" and "The Long Goodbye", the latter of which was written by Irish pop singers Ronan Keating and Paul Brady. After it, the duo charted at number five with "My Heart Is Lost to You" and number 12 with a cover of Kim Richey's "Every River", featuring a backing vocal from Richey. All of these other singles also made the pop charts. "Only in America" was later used by George W. Bush in his 2004 re-election campaign, and again in 2008 by Barack Obama in his campaign. In 2023, Donald Trump took the stage at a campaign rally while the lyric "One could end up going to prison" from "Only in America" played. Trump was facing multiple criminal charges at the time. Noting that the song was used by both a Republican and a Democratic candidate, Brooks (who wrote the song with Cook and Ronnie Rogers) said that it was "very flattering to know our song crossed parties and potentially inspires all Americans".

This album was generally well received, with the reviews in Allmusic and Country Standard Time noting that the album was more consistent than the previous ones. Nash was less favorable, referring to the up-tempos as "retreads", but praising Dunn's voice.

=== It Won't Be Christmas Without You and Red Dirt Road ===
Brooks and Dunn released their first Christmas album in 2002 titled It Won't Be Christmas Without You. Four of its cuts made the country music charts based on seasonal airplay: the title track, "Hangin' 'round the Mistletoe", "Rockin' Little Christmas", and a rendition of "Winter Wonderland". It was followed in early 2003 by the duo's eighth studio album, Red Dirt Road, whose title track became the duo's 18th number one on Billboard. Two more singles were released from it: "You Can't Take the Honky Tonk Out of the Girl", which spent five weeks in the number-three position, and "That's What She Gets for Loving Me" at number six. On the Hot 100, these songs respectively peaked at 25, 39, and 53. As with Steers & Stripes, Red Dirt Road was certified platinum. The album featured a rock-oriented sound compared to the duo's previous releases.

Erlewine described Red Dirt Road as a concept album in his review of it, saying that its title track and other songs offered a "tribute to their roots and upbringing". Nash gave the album an A-minus rating, saying that Brooks & Dunn "dig even deeper" on the album; she also referred to the title track as a "gutsy account of the terrible beauty of coming of age". A less favorable review came from Country Standard Time, whose critic Jeffrey B. Remz called it "satisfactory, but not much more". Both Nash and Remz compared "You Can't Take the Honky Tonk Out of the Girl" to the sound of The Rolling Stones.

=== The Greatest Hits Collection II and Hillbilly Deluxe ===
Arista Nashville released Brooks and Dunn's second greatest-hits package, The Greatest Hits Collection II, in October 2004. The album included singles from If You See Her, Steers and Stripes, Red Dirt Road, and the previously unreleased "That's What It's All About" and "It's Getting Better All the Time". Respectively, these cuts peaked at numbers two and one on the country-music charts, as well as 38 and 56 on the Hot 100. It excludes material from Tight Rope.

In August 2005, the duo released the single "Play Something Country". According to Dunn and co-writer Terry McBride, it was inspired by Gretchen Wilson, who was touring with Brooks and Dunn and Big & Rich on the Deuces Wild tour at the time. "Play Something Country" was the lead-off to their ninth studio album, Hillbilly Deluxe. Brooks & Dunn co-produced it with Tony Brown, with further production from Mark Wright on "My Heart's Not a Hotel". A month after the album's release, "Play Something Country" became the duo's twentieth and final number one on Hot Country Songs, and went to number 37 on the Billboard Hot 100. The album's second single, "Believe", peaked at number eight, also winning the next year's Single of the Year and Song of the Year awards from the Country Music Association. After it was "Building Bridges", with guest vocals from Vince Gill and Sheryl Crow, which peaked at number four. Before the duo released this song, it had been released by co-writer Larry Willoughby, a cousin of country singer Rodney Crowell, and later by Nicolette Larson. The final release from Hillbilly Deluxe was the title track, which peaked at number 16 on Hot Country Songs. Erlewine gave this album a positive review, saying that it was not "quite as ambitious" as the previous two albums, but "just as satisfying".

Brooks and Dunn began their Long Haul tour in mid-2006, which featured Sugarland and Jack Ingram as opening acts. Of this tour, Brooks said, "They've got a lot of shows under their belt, they're really good at what they do, and they are great performers[…]We want everything about this show from opening act 'til the lights go down to be first class."

=== Cowboy Town ===
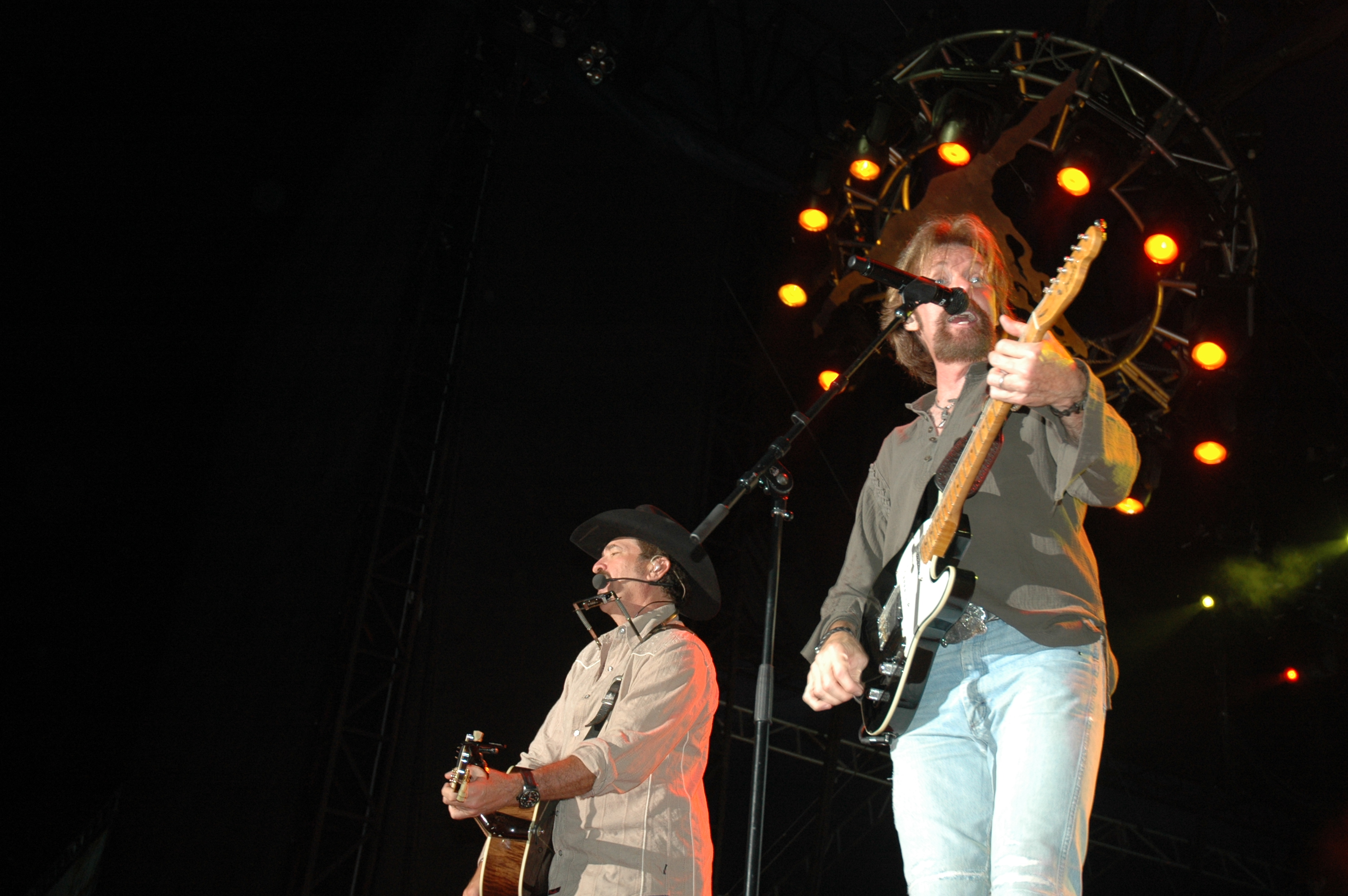
Brooks & Dunn at Aberdeen Proving Ground, August 2009

Their 10th studio album, Cowboy Town, was released on October 2, 2007. Its lead-off single "Proud of the House We Built" reached number four on the country charts and 57 on the Hot 100. Following this song were "God Must Be Busy" at number 11 and "Put a Girl in It" at number three. After this song, the duo released "Cowgirls Don't Cry", which they later performed with Reba McEntire at the Country Music Association awards. Following this performance, the song was re-released partway through its chart run with McEntire dubbed into the final chorus. In early 2009, the song peaked at number two on the country charts. Although not released as a single, the title track spent three weeks on the charts and peaked at number 56. Also included on the album is a collaboration with Jerry Jeff Walker on "The Ballad of Jerry Jeff Walker". Cowboy Town was also the name of the duo's 2009 tour, which featured Rodney Atkins and ZZ Top. The tour began on June 6 at the BamaJam festival in Enterprise, Alabama.

Stephen Thomas Erlewine wrote, "Brooks & Dunn have crafted these songs[…]with an eye on the middle of the road, and they do it well enough that this music will likely win them that audience yet again." Mikael Wood of Entertainment Weekly rated it "B+", saying that "even if the themes on their 11th studio CD are a bit predictable, their muscular riffs and handsome vocal harmonies give the material a boot-scooting vibrancy".

=== Retirement, solo careers, reunion, and Reboot ===
On August 10, 2009, Brooks and Dunn announced that they would be splitting up after a tour titled The Last Rodeo. According to Brooks, the decision to split was on good terms; he told CMT that Dunn and he are "still good friends", while Dunn said, "We've ended up more like brothers." The duo released its final compilation, #1s… and Then Some, on September 8 of the same year. The album features 28 past hits and two new songs, but again skipping material from Tight Rope. Both of these new songs, "Indian Summer" and "Honky Tonk Stomp" (featuring guest vocals from Billy Gibbons of ZZ Top), peaked at number 16 on the country-music charts. On May 23, 2010, CBS aired a tribute show presented by the Academy of Country Music titled The Last Rodeo, on which various country music stars performed Brooks & Dunn songs while the duo received a Milestone Award. The academy donated proceeds from the concert to help victims of the 2010 Tennessee floods. Brooks and Dunn performed their last concert together at the Bridgestone Arena in Nashville on September 2, 2010, with proceeds from the concert benefiting the Country Music Hall of Fame.

Both members stayed with Arista Nashville as solo artists after the split. Dunn released his self-titled solo album in June 2011, which produced the top 40 country hits "Bleed Red", "Cost of Livin'" and "Let the Cowboy Rock". Dunn announced via Facebook on June 7, 2012, that he had exited Arista Nashville. Restaurant chain Cracker Barrel reissued the album in late May with two bonus tracks; proceeds from the reissue benefit the Wounded Warrior Project. In late 2013, Dunn sang duet vocals with Kelly Clarkson on a cover of "Baby, It's Cold Outside" from her Christmas album Wrapped in Red. Dunn's second solo album, Peace, Love, and Country Music, was released in 2014, followed by Tattooed Heart in 2016 on Valory Music Group's Nash Icon label. The latter features Brooks on the single "Damn Drunk". Brooks released the solo single "New to This Town", which features Joe Walsh on slide guitar. Brooks' first Arista album, also titled New to This Town, was released in September 2012.

On December 3, 2014, Brooks & Dunn were announced to be reuniting to perform a series of concerts in Las Vegas with Reba McEntire in mid to late 2015. In 2016, they were selected as some of the 30 artists to perform on "Forever Country", a mash-up track featuring the artists performing a medley of "Take Me Home, Country Roads", "On the Road Again", and "I Will Always Love You", which was released in celebration of 50 years of the CMA Awards.

In February 2019, the duo announced a new album called Reboot, which features re-recordings of their previous singles with guest vocals from contemporary country-music artists. In advance of the album's release, they issued two of their tracks - a version of "Brand New Man" with Luke Combs, and "Believe" featuring Kane Brown. In addition, Brooks and Dunn announced a concert in Dallas, alongside their Las Vegas residency, as well as a March 2019 appearance at the Houston Livestock Show and Rodeo. Reboot was released on April 5, 2019.

In 2019, the duo featured in season 16 of The Voice as battle advisors as a part of Team Blake.

Brooks & Dunn announced a sequel album to Reboot in 2024, titled Reboot II. It includes re-recordings of their previous hit singles with other country music artists such as Jelly Roll, Lainey Wilson, and Megan Moroney. Unlike the previous project, it also includes collaborations with rock band Halestorm and blues singer Marcus King. The album was released on November 15, 2024.

== Other works ==
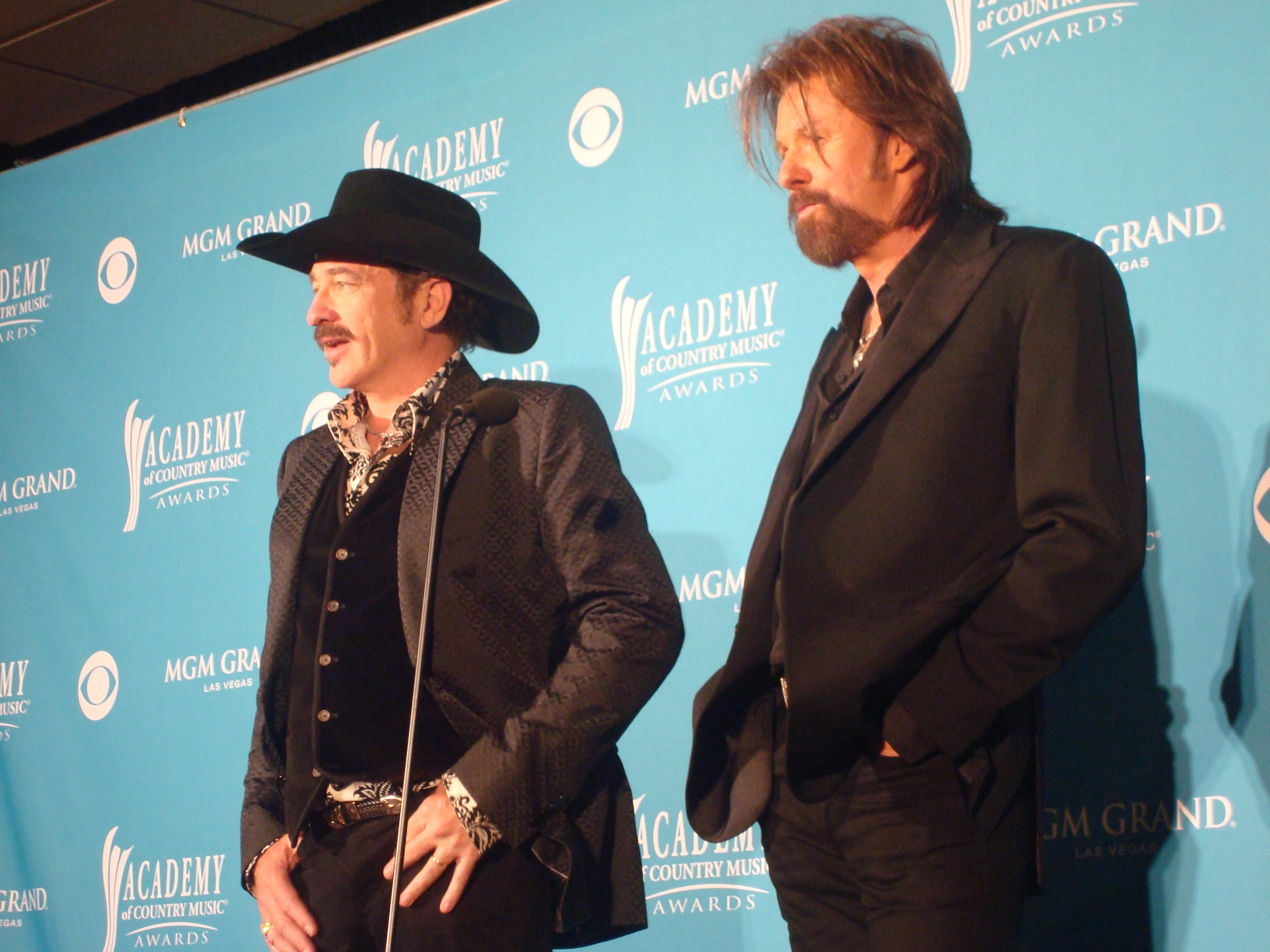
Kix Brooks (left) and Ronnie Dunn (right) at the 2010 Academy of Country Music awards

Brooks and Dunn have also contributed to several soundtracks and compilation albums. In 1994, they recorded "Ride 'em High, Ride 'em Low" for the soundtrack to the 1994 film 8 Seconds, and a cover of "Corrine, Corrina" in collaboration with Asleep at the Wheel for a tribute album to Bob Wills. Both of these cuts peaked at number 73 on the country charts, while "Rock My World" was climbing. In early September 1994, the duo collaborated with Johnny Cash on a rendition of his song "Folsom Prison Blues" for the album Red Hot + Country, a charity album made by the Red Hot Organization to benefit AIDS awareness. Also that year, they covered "Best of My Love" on the Eagles tribute album Common Thread: The Songs of the Eagles. They covered Bob Seger's "Against the Wind" for the soundtrack to the cartoon King of the Hill; this rendition charted at number 55 in late 1999 based on unsolicited airplay. They also recorded "Keep On Swinging", which Brooks wrote with Five for Fighting, for the soundtrack to the 2006 animated film Everyone's Hero. Finally, they collaborated with Mac Powell on "Over the Next Hill" from the soundtrack to the 2008 film Billy: The Early Years, and took the song to number 55 on the country charts.

Dunn has sung guest vocals on other artists' songs, including Lee Roy Parnell's mid-1994 cover of the Hank Williams song "Take These Chains from My Heart" (from Parnell's album On the Road), "Try Me" on Trisha Yearwood's 2005 album Jasper County, "Raise the Barn" on Keith Urban's 2006 album Love, Pain & the Whole Crazy Thing, and Ashley Monroe's 2006 single "I Don't Want To", which reached number 37 on the country charts. He also sang duet vocals with Carlene Carter on a cover of Johnny Cash and June Carter Cash's "Jackson" for the 2007 tribute album Anchored in Love: A Tribute to June Carter Cash. In 2011, he covered Gary Stewart's "She's Actin' Single (I'm Drinkin' Doubles)" for the soundtrack of the film Country Strong, and contributed duet vocals to Cledus T. Judd's parody of "God Must Be Busy", titled "Garth Must Be Busy".

Dunn and Dean Dillon co-wrote Shenandoah's 1994 single "Darned If I Don't (Danged If I Do)" and the track "She Wants Me to Stay" on David Kersh's debut album Goodnight Sweetheart. He also co-wrote "Don't Leave" on Toby Keith's 2003 album Shock'n Y'all with Keith, and Reba McEntire's 2010 single "I Keep On Loving You" with Terry McBride. Brooks & Dunn co-wrote "Steady as She Goes" on Wade Hayes' debut album Old Enough to Know Better and "Our Time Is Coming" (originally an album cut from Hard Workin' Man) on his second album On a Good Night, while Dunn co-produced his 2001 album Highways & Heartaches.

In January 2006, Brooks succeeded Bob Kingsley as the host of the radio countdown show American Country Countdown, while Kingsley moved to his own show, Bob Kingsley's Country Top 40. Brooks received an Academy of Country Music nomination for National On-Air Radio Personality in 2010, and again in 2011. Later that same year, he made his acting debut in an independent film called Thriftstore Cowboy. In 2011, he starred in a second film, The Last Ride.

In the liner notes to each of their studio albums, Brooks & Dunn wrote short stories about Slim & Howdy, fictionalized cowboy versions of themselves. The duo worked with Bill Fitzhugh in late 2008 to write a book titled The Adventures of Slim and Howdy.

== Musical style and artistry ==
Steve Huey of Allmusic contrasts Brooks' and Dunn's voices, saying that Dunn "was the quietly intense singer with the soulful voice, while Kix Brooks played the part of the high-energy showman". He also describes their sound as "a winning formula of rambunctious, rocked-up honky tonk with punchy, danceable beats [alternated with] smooth, pop-tinged ballads". In the book The New Generation of County Music Stars, David Dicaire describes Dunn as "possess[ing] a soulful voice with a quiet intensity" and a "traditional country singer", while calling Brooks "the opposite to Dunn's musical personality", "a high-energy showman" and "the perfect accompaniment to his partner". Brooks sang lead on "Lost and Found", "Rock My World", "You're Gonna Miss Me When I'm Gone", "Mama Don't Get Dressed Up for Nothing", "Why Would I Say Goodbye", and "South of Santa Fe".

Michael McCall of New Country magazine attributed Brooks & Dunn's success in the 1990s to a rise of upstart duos throughout the early-mid 1990s, as very few two-person acts in country music existed after the breakup of the Judds in 1991. He noted that in 1993, the Academy of Country Music had only four acts instead of five in the Vocal Duo of the Year category, and two of the four nominees were not signed to a record label at the time. By 1994, McCall stated that several more duos had been formed in response, mostly consisting of male songwriters, such as Turner Nichols, Archer/Park, and Orrall & Wright. McCall also thought the renewed interest in duos helped to draw newfound attention to the few existing duos who had lost popularity after the beginning of the 1990s, such as the Bellamy Brothers and Sweethearts of the Rodeo.

== Philanthropy ==
In 2015, Brooks received the inaugural CMA Foundation "Humanitarian Award" as a reflection of his dedication to organizations such as Monroe Carell Jr. Children's Hospital at Vanderbilt, The Monroe Harding Children's Home, and the CMA Foundation. He was pivotal in the creation of the "Keep The Music Playing" program which is funded from proceeds of the CMA Music Fest. The campaign has provided more than $11M into Tennessee schools for music education since 2006. For several years, Dunn's annual "Rock The Barn" event at his home near Nashville raised money for charities such as Gilda's Club and the St. Thomas Breast Cancer Center.

== Discography ==
=== Studio albums ===
- Brand New Man (1991)
- Hard Workin' Man (1993)
- Waitin' on Sundown (1994)
- Borderline (1996)
- If You See Her (1998)
- Tight Rope (1999)
- Steers & Stripes (2001)
- It Won't Be Christmas Without You (2002)
- Red Dirt Road (2003)
- Hillbilly Deluxe (2005)
- Cowboy Town (2007)
- Reboot (2019)
- Reboot II (2024)

=== Compilation albums ===
- The Greatest Hits Collection (1997)
- Super Hits (1999)
- The Greatest Hits Collection II (2004)
- Playlist: The Very Best of Brooks & Dunn (2008)
- #1s... and Then Some (2009)

== Awards ==
Brooks & Dunn are the winners of the most Country Music Association Awards in history with 21, including the 1996 Entertainer of the Year and 16 wins for Vocal Duo of the Year. They received the associations Lifetime Achievement Award in 2026. They have the second-most Academy of Country Music awards in history with 30, only surpassed by Miranda Lambert with 35. They have won 2 Grammy Awards, both for Best Country Vocal Performance by a Duo or Group.
