= I'll Never Forgive My Heart =

Single by Brooks & Dunn

from the album Waitin' on Sundown
- B-side: "A Few Good Rides Away"
- Released: November 7, 1994
- Genre: Country
- Length: 3:20
- Label: Arista 12779
- Songwriters: Dean Dillon; Janine Dunn; Ronnie Dunn
- Producers: Don Cook; Scott Hendricks

Brooks & Dunn singles chronology
"She's Not the Cheatin' Kind" (1994)	"I'll Never Forgive My Heart" (1994)	"Little Miss Honky Tonk" (1995)

"I'll Never Forgive My Heart" is a song written by Ronnie Dunn, his wife Janine, and Dean Dillon. It was recorded by American country music duo Brooks & Dunn that peaked at number 6 on the Billboard Hot Country Singles & Tracks chart. It was released in November 1994 as the second single from their album Waitin' on Sundown.

== Critical reception ==
Deborah Evans Price, of Billboard magazine reviewed the song favorably, calling it one of Dunn's "most effective honky-tonk vocals on this sawdust-floor slow number about an uninvited heartache."

== Chart positions ==
"I'll Never Forgive My Heart" debuted at number 58 on the U.S. Billboard Hot Country Singles & Tracks for the week of November 12, 1994.

Chart (1994–1995)	Peak position
Canada Country Singles (RPM)	2
US Hot Country Songs (Billboard)	6

=== Year-end charts ===
Chart (1995)	Position
Canada Country Tracks (RPM)	10
