= Indian Summer (Brooks & Dunn song) =

Single by Brooks & Dunn

from the album #1s… and Then Some
- Released: May 25, 2009
- Recorded: 2009
- Genre: Country
- Length: 4:22
- Label: Arista Nashville
- Songwriters: Kix Brooks; Bob DiPiero; Ronnie Dunn
- Producers: Kix Brooks, Ronnie Dunn

Brooks & Dunn singles chronology
"Cowgirls Don't Cry" (2008)	"Indian Summer" (2009)	"Honky Tonk Stomp" (2009)

"Indian Summer" is a song by the American country music duo Brooks & Dunn. It was written by the duo's members, Kix Brooks and Ronnie Dunn, along with Bob DiPiero. As Brooks & Dunn's 49th single, it was released in May 2009 and was the lead-off single to the duo's third greatest hits album #1s… and Then Some, released on September 8, 2009, via Arista Nashville.

== Content ==
The song is a mid-tempo ballad describing a couple who fall in love during an Indian summer: a star football player and a cheerleader whom he meets. They fall in love, but are separated by autumn. The girl becomes pregnant and does not want to suffer the prejudices of small-town morals (which would look down on an unmarried, single mother) and therefore decides to escape to California. The song is predominantly sung in the third person, but the final verse reveals the narrator to be the football player in the song, who seems to regret choosing his football career over his love ("I wonder where we'd be / If I'd never scored that last touchdown").

== Critical reception ==
Jim Malec of The 9513 gave the song a thumbs-down rating. Although his review makes note of the song's "ominous tone" and the "genuine longing" in Dunn's voice, he also goes on to say that he considers the lyrics uninspired as they do not flesh out any specifics on either character involved in the storyline.

== Cover versions ==
Country music singer Reba McEntire covered the song from The Last Rodeo Tour

== Music video ==
The video was released on July 24, 2009, on Country Music Television. It was directed by Shaun Silva. It was filmed in Chowchilla, California, in the local high school, home of the Chowchilla Union High School Redskins. The video was voted number 49 On GAC's Top 50 Videos of the Year list.

== Chart performance ==
"Indian Summer" debuted at number 48 on the Billboard Hot Country Songs chart dated for May 23, 2009.

Chart (2009)	Peak position
US Hot Country Songs (Billboard)	16
US Billboard Bubbling Under Hot 100	1
Canada Country (Billboard)	13
Canada Hot 100 (Billboard)	74
