= Honky Tonk Stomp =

Single by Brooks & Dunn featuring Billy Gibbons

from the album #1s… and Then Some
- Released: August 10, 2009
- Genre: Country; Country rock
- Length: 3:03
- Label: Arista Nashville
- Songwriters: Ronnie Dunn; Terry McBride; Bobby Pinson
- Producers: Ronnie Dunn; Terry McBride

Brooks & Dunn singles chronology
"Indian Summer" (2009)	"Honky Tonk Stomp" (2009)

"Honky Tonk Stomp" is a song recorded by American country music duo Brooks & Dunn. It was written by duo member Ronnie Dunn along with Terry McBride and Bobby Pinson. It is the 50th overall single for the duo, the second and final single from their compilation album #1s… and Then Some. The song features Billy Gibbons, lead singer of the band ZZ Top. The music video was voted in No. 47 on GAC's Top 50 Videos of the Year list.

== Content ==
The song is an up-tempo backed by electric guitar, with Dunn singing about being out in the country with a large party.

Billy Gibbons of the rock band ZZ Top plays guitar and sings guest vocals on the song. According to Great American Country, Bobby Pinson came up with the song's theme, with Dunn suggesting the title "Honky Tonk Stomp" after the rest of the song had been written.

== Critical reception ==
Thom Jurek of Allmusic cited the song as a standout track in his review of the album, calling it a "barroom and stadium rock killer[…]which opens the set with special guest guitar blazer Billy Gibbons of ZZ Top." Bobby Peacock of Roughstock gave the song a favorable review, saying that it was "the hardest that B&D has ever rocked in its career."

== Music video ==
The video was directed by Thien Phan. Gibbons guest stars in the video. This video shows the duo, as well as various fans stomping along to the song's beat. Outside shots were filmed at the Cadillac Ranch in Amarillo, Texas in July 2009. B&D are shown performing on the Cadillac vehicles, which have been spray painted with their names and the date. At the end of the video, the duo is seen stomping off into the sunset. One of the wheels stops and reveals the word, "Stomp."

== Chart performance ==
On the week ending October 24, 2009, "Honky Tonk Stomp" debuted on the Billboard Hot 100 at number 97. The following week, it fell to number 100, but the week after that it rebounded to number 96. The song peaked at number 16 on the Hot Country Songs chart in late October 2009.

Chart (2009)	Peak position
Canada Country (Billboard)	8
US Hot Country Songs (Billboard)	16
US Billboard Hot 100	96
