= InMusic =

Music news website

inMusic (formerly known as Sympatico/MSN Music) was a Canadian music news portal and an online music store. The music store had over 2 million tracks in English and French from various genres. Samples of 30 seconds for each song were offered at no charge. Purchases and downloads could be transferred to a CD or compatible digital music device.

== History ==
Bell Sympatico and Microsoft partnered to launch the Sympatico/MSN Music Store on July 31, 2006. Powered by Hip Digital Media Inc., the store initially offered 850,000 songs, but with ongoing support, this has risen to over 2 million.

The store was designed as MSN Music's portal in Canada, and featured various Microsoft integrations such as Bing and Hotmail. The Sympatico/MSN Music Store was tightly integrated with the Sympatico/MSN Entertainment Portal.

When initially launched, the Sympatico / MSN Music Store offered their catalogue of songs on a pay-per-download basis (similar to that of iTunes). In July, 2007 the store added a subscription service called All Access Music, allowing users unlimited access to their All Access Music Library for a monthly or an annual fee. In October 2007, the Sympatico / MSN Music Store further expanded its offerings with an MP3 catalogue, providing music in the MP3 format, thereby catering to the iPod market.

== Music store ==
The music store is discontinued. inMusic now directs visitors to purchase songs on iTunes.

=== Downloads ===
inMusic sold music by the song and by the album. While the service used a WMA format with digital rights management (DRM) during its Sympatico/MSN branding, the provider eventually discontinued such sales in favor of the MP3 format when it was rebranded as inMusic and used Puretrack's engine. Individual songs were sometimes sold at 79¢ each, although the 99¢ price point was more common.

=== Subscription ===
When the service was branded as Sympatico/MSN Music, it offered a subscription based service at launch with two plans: All Access Music and All Access Music To Go. The former plan was $14/month and only accessible from any computer, while the latter was $16/month and added the ability of transferring music to a compatible digital music device. Windows Media Audio was the file format used for the service's songs, and all such files were encrypted with Microsoft PlaysForSure DRM. This limited the playback of music to three authorized computers while offline, although music can be streamed from any computer with an active Internet connection. The DRM also prohibited the burning of song files to an audio compact disc. Bell Internet (then known as Sympatico) customers received a $4/month discount for subscribing to either plan, and the service could be charged directly on their Bell Canada monthly bill. After the Sympatico/MSN Music brand was phased out DRM-based subscriptions were no longer available.

=== Other ===
inMusic offered exclusive content to its users such as special recordings from artists at the Live @ Orange Lounge as well as articles and playlists from featured and recommended artists. Gift cards were also available.
