= It Won't Be Christmas Without You =

Studio album by Brooks & Dunn
- Released: October 8, 2002
- Genre: Country
- Length: 33:06
- Label: Arista Nashville
- Producers: Kix Brooks, Ronnie Dunn, Mark Wright, Greg Droman

Brooks & Dunn chronology
Steers & Stripes (2001)	It Won't Be Christmas Without You (2002)	Red Dirt Road (2003)

It Won't Be Christmas Without You is the eighth studio album and the first Christmas album by country music duo Brooks & Dunn released in 2002. Their first album of Christmas music, it features covers of traditional Christmas songs, as well as several newly written tunes. Four of the album's songs — "Hangin' 'Round the Mistletoe", the title track, "Rockin' Little Christmas" and "Winter Wonderland" — received enough airplay to enter the Billboard country music charts, peaking at numbers 47, 41, 57 and 57, respectively.

The album received a 3 star rating from AllMusic, with an unattributed review praising Brooks & Dunn for "wisely foregoing the drippy, synth-laden production that ruins many contemporary country Christmas albums, instead relying on the neo-honky tonk sound that made the duo famous."

== Track listing ==
1. "Winter Wonderland" (Felix Bernard, Richard B. Smith) – 3:00
2. "Hangin' 'Round the Mistletoe" (Kostas) – 2:41
3. "It Won't Be Christmas Without You" (Steven Busch, Ronnie Dunn, Jerry Lynn Williams) – 3:43
4. "Rockin' Little Christmas" (Deborah Allen, Bruce Channel) – 3:06
5. "Blue Christmas" (Billy Hayes, Jay W. Johnson)– 3:29
6. "Santa's Coming over to Your House" (Kix Brooks, Don Cook) – 2:32
7. "The Christmas Song" (Mel Tormé, Robert Wells) – 2:56
8. "Santa Claus Is Coming to Town" (John Frederick Coots, Haven Gillespie) – 2:24
9. "Who Says There Ain't No Santa" (Brooks, Larry Boone, Paul Nelson) – 3:41
10. "I'll Be Home for Christmas" (Kim Gannon, Walter Kent, Buck Ram) – 2:42
11. "White Christmas" (Irving Berlin) – 2:46

== Personnel ==
Brooks & Dunn

- Kix Brooks - lead vocals, background vocals
- Ronnie Dunn - lead vocals, background vocals

Additional Musicians

- Deborah Allen - background vocals
- Bekka Bramlett - background vocals
- David Campbell - string arrangements, conductor
- Bruce Channel - background vocals
- Lisa Cochran - background vocals
- Eric Darken - percussion
- Dan Dugmore - steel guitar
- Shannon Forrest - drums
- Paul Franklin - steel guitar
- Barry Green - trombone
- Kenny Greenberg - electric guitar
- Mike Haynes - trumpet
- Aubrey Haynie - fiddle, mandolin
- Jim Horn - baritone saxophone
- B. James Lowry - acoustic guitar
- Brent Mason - electric guitar
- The Nashville String Machine - strings
- Steve Nathan - keyboards, Hammond organ, piano
- Steve Patrick - trumpet
- Michael Rhodes - bass guitar
- Brent Rowan - electric guitar
- John Wesley Ryles - background vocals
- Denis Solee - tenor saxophone
- Harry Stinson - background vocals

== Charts ==
=== Weekly charts ===
Chart (2002)	Peak position
US Billboard 200	81
US Top Country Albums (Billboard)	12
US Top Holiday Albums (Billboard)	7

=== Year-end charts ===
Chart (2003)	Position
US Top Country Albums (Billboard)	55
