= Why Would I Say Goodbye =

Single by Brooks & Dunn

from the album Borderline
- B-side: "White Line Casanova"
- Released: March 17, 1997
- Genre: Country
- Length: 4:18 (album version); 3:53 (radio edit)
- Label: Arista 13073
- Songwriters: Kix Brooks; Chris Waters
- Producers: Kix Brooks; Don Cook; Ronnie Dunn

Brooks & Dunn singles chronology
"A Man This Lonely" (1996)	"Why Would I Say Goodbye" (1997)	"Honky Tonk Truth" (1997)

"Why Would I Say Goodbye" is a song written by Kix Brooks and Chris Waters, and recorded by American country music duo Brooks & Dunn. It was released on March 17, 1997, as the fifth and final single from their fourth studio album Borderline. The song reached a peak of number 8 on the US Country chart, and number 9 on the Canadian RPM Country Tracks chart. This is the fifth of the six Brooks & Dunn singles in which Kix Brooks sings the lead vocals instead of Ronnie Dunn.

== Chart positions ==
"Why Would I Say Goodbye" debuted at number 50 on the U.S. Billboard Hot Country Songs chart for the week of March 22, 1997.

Chart (1997)	Peak position
Canada Country Singles (RPM)	9
US Hot Country Songs (Billboard)	8

=== Year-end charts ===
Chart (1997)	Position
Canada Country Tracks (RPM)	82
US Country Songs (Billboard)	60
