= You'll Always Be Loved by Me =

Single by Brooks & Dunn

from the album Tight Rope
- B-side: "Don't Look Back Now"
- Released: March 21, 2000
- Recorded: 1999
- Genre: Country
- Length: 3:02
- Label: Arista Nashville 13198
- Songwriters: Ronnie Dunn; Terry McBride
- Producers: Kix Brooks; Ronnie Dunn; Byron Gallimore

Brooks & Dunn singles chronology
"Beer Thirty" (1999)	"You'll Always Be Loved by Me" (2000)	"Ain't Nothing 'bout You" (2001)

"You'll Always Be Loved by Me" is a song written by Ronnie Dunn and Terry McBride, and recorded by American country music duo Brooks & Dunn. It was released in March 2000 as the third and final single from their album Tight Rope. It peaked at number 5, and is the only single from the album to reach the Top 10. The title of its parent album Tight Rope is mentioned in this song.

== Chart positions ==
"You'll Always Be Loved by Me" debuted at number 69 on the U.S. Billboard Hot Country Singles & Tracks chart for the week of March 18, 2000.

Chart (2000)	Peak position
Canada Country Singles (RPM)	7
US Billboard Hot 100	55
US Hot Country Songs (Billboard)	5

=== Year-end charts ===
Chart (2000)	Position
US Country Songs (Billboard)	34
