= Honky Tonk Truth =

Single by Brooks & Dunn

from the album The Greatest Hits Collection
- B-side: "He's Got You"
- Released: August 25, 1997
- Genre: Country
- Length: 3:14
- Label: Arista Nashville 13101
- Songwriters: Ronnie Dunn; Kim Williams; Lonnie Wilson
- Producers: Kix Brooks; Don Cook; Ronnie Dunn

Brooks & Dunn singles chronology
"Why Would I Say Goodbye" (1997)	"Honky Tonk Truth" (1997)	"He's Got You" (1997)

"Honky Tonk Truth" is a song written by Ronnie Dunn, Kim Williams and Lonnie Wilson, and recorded by American country music duo Brooks & Dunn. It was released in August 1997 as the first single from their first compilation album The Greatest Hits Collection. It peaked at #3 on the US Country chart.

== Music video ==
The music video premiered on CMT in August, 1997 and featured NASCAR driver Dale Earnhardt dressed like Kix Brooks. It was directed by Sherman Halsey. It was shot in Las Vegas. Brooks & Dunn are also seen performing in Caesar's Palace casino, the top balcony of the Rio hotel overlooking the city & in front of the old Caesar's Palace sign on the Strip, displaying song related messages such as, "Liar." Ronnie Dunn was dressed in all black.

== Chart positions ==
"Honky Tonk Truth" debuted at number 41 on the U.S. Billboard Hot Country Songs chart for the week of August 30, 1997.

Chart (1997)	Peak position
Canada Country Singles (RPM)	3
US Hot Country Songs (Billboard)	3

=== Year-end charts ===
Chart (1997)	Position
Canada Country Tracks (RPM)	39
US Country Songs (Billboard)	67
