= Tight Rope (album) =

Studio album by Brooks & Dunn
- Released: September 21, 1999
- Genre: Country
- Length: 47:06
- Label: Arista Nashville
- Producers: Kix Brooks, Don Cook, Ronnie Dunn, Byron Gallimore

Brooks & Dunn chronology
Super Hits (1999)	Tight Rope (1999)	Steers & Stripes (2001)

Alternative Cover
- Re-release with title printed on cover

Singles from Tight Rope
- 1. "Missing You" Released: August 2, 1999; 2. "Beer Thirty" Released: October 25, 1999; 3. "You'll Always Be Loved by Me" Released: March 21, 2000

Professional ratings
Review scores
Source	Rating
AllMusic	3/5 stars

Tight Rope is the sixth studio album by American country music duo Brooks & Dunn, released in 1999 on Arista Nashville. Their least successful album commercially, it was the first album of their career not to receive platinum certification from the RIAA; furthermore, only one of its three singles reached the top ten on the country charts. The album's lead single was a cover of John Waite's 1984 number-one pop hit "Missing You". This cover peaked at No. 15 on the Hot Country Songs chart. Following it were "Beer Thirty" (No. 19) and "You'll Always Be Loved by Me" (No. 5). "Goin' Under Gettin' Over You" reached No. 60 from unsolicited play as an album cut.

In the years following its release, Tight Rope has been largely marginalized in Brooks & Dunn's broader legacy and performance history. The duo has performed material from the album live on only two occasions, and none of its singles featured on any subsequent retrospective or greatest hits compilation released throughout their career.

== Track listing ==
Tight Rope track listing
No.	Title	Writer(s)	Length
1.	"Goin' Under Gettin' Over You"	Ronnie Dunn, Terry McBride	2:56
2.	"Missing You"	John Waite, Mark Leonard, Charles Sandford	3:46
3.	"Temptation #9"	Kix Brooks, Bob DiPiero	3:32
4.	"Hurt Train"	Dunn, McBride	4:04
5.	"Can't Stop My Heart"	Brooks, Chris Waters, Tom Shapiro	4:19
6.	"Too Far This Time"	Dunn	3:30
7.	"You'll Always Be Loved by Me"	Dunn, McBride	3:02
8.	"I Love You More"	Brooks, DiPiero	3:21
9.	"Beer Thirty"	Dunn, McBride	2:37
10.	"Don't Look Back Now"	Brooks, Don Cook	3:52
11.	"All Out of Love"	Dunn, McBride	4:09
12.	"The Trouble with Angels"	Brooks, DiPiero	4:12
13.	"Texas and Norma Jean"	Brooks, Lewis Anderson	3:51

== Charts ==
=== Weekly charts ===
Chart (1999)	Peak position
Canadian Country Albums (RPM)	6
US Billboard 200	31
US Top Country Albums (Billboard)	6

=== Year-end charts ===
Chart (1999)	Position
US Top Country Albums (Billboard)	56
Chart (2000)	Position
US Top Country Albums (Billboard)	41

== Certifications ==
Region	Certification	Certified units/sales
United States (RIAA)	Gold	500,000^{^}
^{^} Shipments figures based on certification alone.

== Personnel ==
=== Brooks & Dunn ===
- Kix Brooks - lead vocals, background vocals
- Ronnie Dunn - lead vocals, background vocals

=== Musicians ===
- Robert Bailey - background vocals
- Bruce Bouton - lap steel guitar, pedal steel guitar
- Mike Brignardello - bass guitar
- Larry Byrom - acoustic guitar
- Mark Casstevens - acoustic guitar
- Kim Fleming - background vocals
- Larry Franklin - fiddle
- Paul Franklin - pedal steel guitar, lap steel guitar
- Rob Hajacos - fiddle, "assorted hoedown tools"
- Vicki Hampton - background vocals
- Aubrey Haynie - fiddle
- John Barlow Jarvis - piano, keyboards, Hammond B-3 organ
- B. James Lowry - electric guitar
- Brent Mason - electric guitar
- Steve Nathan - keyboards
- John Wesley Ryles - background vocals
- Dennis Wilson - background vocals
- Lonnie Wilson - drums, percussion
- Glenn Worf - bass guitar
- Curtis Young - background vocals

=== Production ===
- Kix Brooks, Ronnie Dunn, Don Cook (tracks 3, 5, 8, 10, 12, 13)
- Kix Brooks, Ronnie Dunn, Byron Gallimore (tracks 1, 2, 4, 6, 7, 9, 11)
- Doug Sax - Mastering
