= He's Got You =

Single by Brooks & Dunn

from the album The Greatest Hits Collection
- B-side: "Honky Tonk Truth"
- Released: October 20, 1997
- Genre: Country
- Length: 3:11
- Label: Arista Nashville 3105
- Songwriters: Ronnie Dunn; Terry McBride
- Producers: Kix Brooks; Don Cook; Ronnie Dunn

Brooks & Dunn singles chronology
"Honky Tonk Truth" (1997)	"He's Got You" (1997)	"If You See Him/If You See Her" (1998)

"He's Got You" is a song written by Ronnie Dunn and Terry McBride, and recorded by American country music duo Brooks & Dunn. It was released in October 1997 as the second and final single from their compilation album The Greatest Hits Collection. The song peaked at number 2 on the US Country chart for two weeks, only behind "Just to See You Smile" by Tim McGraw.

== Music video ==
The music video was directed by Steven Goldmann and premiered in December 1997. It shows the duo performing the song, intersect with a thunderstorm rolling into the sky.

== Chart positions ==
"He's Got You" debuted at number 70 on the U.S. Billboard Hot Country Songs chart for the week of October 18, 1997.

Chart (1997–1998)	Peak position
Canada Country Singles (RPM)	3
US Hot Country Songs (Billboard)	2

=== Year-end charts ===
Chart (1998)	Position
US Country Songs (Billboard)	37
