= Whiskey Under the Bridge =

"Whiskey Under The Bridge"

Single by Brooks & Dunn

from the album Waitin' on Sundown
- B-side: "My Kind of Crazy"
- Released: September 18, 1995
- Genre: Country
- Length: 2:53
- Label: Arista 12770
- Songwriters: Kix Brooks; Don Cook; Ronnie Dunn
- Producers: Don Cook; Scott Hendricks

Brooks & Dunn singles chronology
"You're Gonna Miss Me When I'm Gone" (1995)	"Whiskey Under The Bridge" (1995)	"My Maria" (1996)

"Whiskey Under The Bridge" is a song co-written and recorded by American country music duo Brooks & Dunn. It was released in September 1995 as the fifth and final single from their album Waitin' on Sundown. It peaked at number 5 on the Billboard Hot Country Singles & Tracks chart. The song was written by Kix Brooks, Don Cook and Ronnie Dunn.

== Critical reception ==
Larry Flick, of Billboard magazine reviewed the song favorably saying that Ronnie Dunn "shines on this well written tune" and that his voice "does equal justice to a heartbreaking weeper of a two-steppin' dance number."

== Chart positions ==
"Whiskey Under the Bridge" debuted at number 53 on the U.S. Billboard Hot Country Singles & Tracks for the week of September 23, 1995.

Chart (1995)	Peak position
Canada Country Singles (RPM)	3
US Hot Country Songs (Billboard)	5

=== Year-end charts ===
Chart (1995)	Position
Canada Country Tracks (RPM)	50
