= I Am That Man =

Single by Brooks & Dunn

from the album Borderline
- B-side: "More Than a Margarita"
- Released: June 3, 1996
- Genre: Country
- Length: 4:09 (album version); 3:28 (single version)
- Label: Arista 13018
- Songwriters: Terry McBride; Monty Powell
- Producers: Kix Brooks; Don Cook; Ronnie Dunn

Brooks & Dunn singles chronology
"My Maria" (1996)	"I Am That Man" (1996)	"Mama Don't Get Dressed Up for Nothing" (1996)

"I Am That Man" is a song written by Terry McBride and Monty Powell, and recorded by American country music duo Brooks & Dunn. It was released in June 1996 as the second single released from their album Borderline. The song peaked at number 2 for two weeks on the Billboard Hot Country Singles & Tracks chart.

== Critical reception ==
Deborah Evans Price, of Billboard magazine reviewed the song favorably, calling it "an earnest song of love and devotion that is marked by Ronnie Dunn's tender lead vocals." She goes on to say that the "production is gentle and understated, allowing Dunn to wrap his voice around the lyric and deliver a poignant interpretation."

== Misheard lyric ==
Many fans have misheard the title in the chorus as "I am Batman".

== Chart positions ==
"I Am That Man" debuted at number 73 on the Billboard Hot Country Songs chart for the week of April 27, 1996. It fell out and re-entered at number 71 on the June 1, 1996 chart.

Chart (1996)	Peak position
Canada Country Singles (RPM)	3
US Hot Country Songs (Billboard)	2

=== Year-end charts ===
Chart (1996)	Position
Canada Country Tracks (RPM)	39
US Country Songs (Billboard)	39
