= Waitin' on Sundown =

Studio album by Brooks & Dunn
- Released: September 27, 1994
- Recorded: 1994
- Studio: Sound Shop (Nashville, Tennessee)
- Genre: Country
- Length: 35:32
- Label: Arista
- Producer: Don Cook; Scott Hendricks

Brooks & Dunn chronology
Hard Workin' Man (1993)	Waitin' on Sundown (1994)	Borderline (1996)

Singles from Waitin' on Sundown
- 1. "She's Not the Cheatin' Kind" Released: August 16, 1994; 2. "I'll Never Forgive My Heart" Released: November 7, 1994; 3. "Little Miss Honky Tonk" Released: February 13, 1995; 4. "You're Gonna Miss Me When I'm Gone" Released: June 12, 1995; 5. "Whiskey Under the Bridge" Released: September 18, 1995

Professional ratings
Review scores
Source	Rating
AllMusic	3/5 stars
Entertainment Weekly	C+

Waitin' on Sundown is the third studio album by American country music duo Brooks & Dunn. Released in 1994 on Arista Records, it produced the hit singles "She's Not the Cheatin' Kind", "I'll Never Forgive My Heart", "Little Miss Honky Tonk", "You're Gonna Miss Me When I'm Gone", and "Whiskey Under the Bridge". Respectively, these songs peaked at #1, #6, #1, #1, and #5 on the Hot Country Songs charts.

== Track listing ==
No.	Title	Writer(s)	Lead vocals	Length
1.	"Little Miss Honky Tonk"	Ronnie Dunn	Ronnie Dunn	3:00
2.	"She's Not the Cheatin' Kind"	R. Dunn	Ronnie Dunn	3:27
3.	"Silver and Gold"	Michael Lunn; Michael Noble	Kix Brooks	4:21
4.	"I'll Never Forgive My Heart"	R. Dunn; Janine Dunn; Dean Dillon	Ronnie Dunn	3:20
5.	"You're Gonna Miss Me When I'm Gone"	Kix Brooks; R. Dunn; Don Cook	Kix Brooks	4:52
6.	"My Kind of Crazy"	Brooks; Cook; Bill LaBounty	Kix Brooks	3:05
7.	"Whiskey Under the Bridge"	Cook; Brooks; R. Dunn	Ronnie Dunn	2:53
8.	"If That's the Way You Want It"	Cook; Brooks; R. Dunn	Ronnie Dunn	3:43
9.	"She's the Kind of Trouble"	Brooks	Kix Brooks	3:00
10.	"A Few Good Rides Away"	Brooks; Chick Rains	Kix Brooks	3:49

== Charts ==
=== Weekly charts ===
Chart (1994)	Peak position
Canadian Albums (RPM)	31
Canadian Country Albums (RPM)	1
US Billboard 200	15
US Top Country Albums (Billboard)	1

=== Year-end charts ===
Chart (1994)	Position
US Top Country Albums (Billboard)	52
Chart (1995)	Position
US Billboard 200	73
US Top Country Albums (Billboard)	10
Chart (1996)	Position
US Top Country Albums (Billboard)	61

== Certifications ==
Region	Certification	Certified units/sales
Canada (Music Canada)	Platinum	100,000^{^}
United States (RIAA)	3× Platinum	3,000,000^{^}
^{^} Shipments figures based on certification alone.

== Personnel ==
Brooks & Dunn

- Kix Brooks – lead vocals on tracks 3, 5, 6, 9, 10 and background vocals
- Ronnie Dunn – lead vocals on tracks 1, 2, 4, 7, 8 and background vocals

Additional musicians

- Bruce Bouton – pedal steel guitar, lap steel guitar
- Mark Casstevens – acoustic guitar, electric guitar
- Rob Hajacos – fiddle
- John Barlow Jarvis – piano, organ
- Bill LaBounty – background vocals
- Brent Mason – electric guitar
- John Wesley Ryles – background vocals
- Harry Stinson – background vocals
- Dennis Wilson – background vocals
- Lonnie Wilson – drums, percussion
- Glenn Worf – bass guitar
