= My Maria =

1973 single by B. W. Stevenson

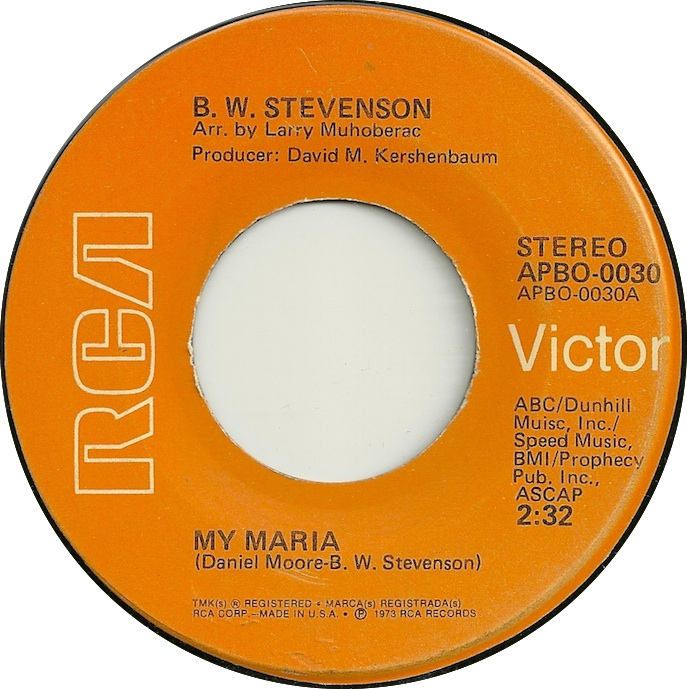
- Side A of the original US single

Single by B. W. Stevenson

from the album My Maria
- B-side: "August Evening Lady"
- Released: July 1973
- Genre: Country rock
- Length: 2:32
- Label: RCA Victor
- Songwriters: B. W. Stevenson; Daniel Moore
- Producer: David Kershenbaum

B. W. Stevenson singles chronology
"Shambala" (1973)	"My Maria" (1973)	"The River of Love" (1973)

Audio
- "My Maria" on YouTube

"My Maria" is a song co-written by B. W. Stevenson and Daniel Moore. Lindy Blaskey, a music publisher at ABC/Dunhill Records, thought Moore had a possible hit with his verse and chorus, but could not get him to finish the song, so Blaskey took what Moore had so far and asked Stevenson to finish writing it with an additional verse. David Kershenbaum, Stevenson's producer at RCA, agreed with Blaskey that it sounded like a hit and produced and released "My Maria" as a single in July 1973.

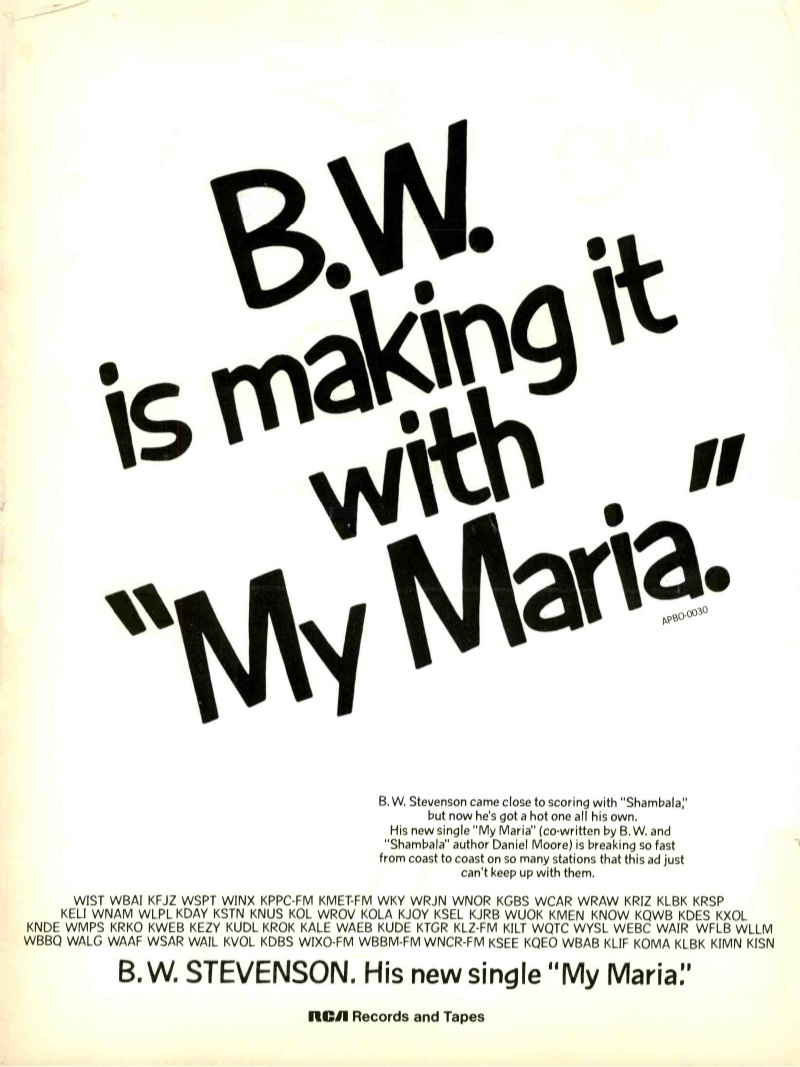
Trade ad for the single, 1973

The song became a Top 10 hit, peaking at No. 9 on the US pop chart. It remained in the Top 40 for twelve weeks. In addition, "My Maria" spent one week at No. 1 on the US adult contemporary chart. The guitar portion of the track was played by Larry Carlton. A cover version by Brooks & Dunn reached No. 1 on the US country music chart and won the 1997 Grammy for Country Performance by a Duo or Group with Vocal.

== Chart history ==
Chart (1973)	Peak position
Australia (KMR)	55
U.S. Billboard Hot 100	9
U.S. Cashbox Top 100	7
U.S. Billboard Easy Listening	1
Canada RPM Top Singles	3
Canada RPM Adult Contemporary	1

== Brooks & Dunn version ==
"My Maria"

Single by Brooks & Dunn

from the album Borderline
- B-side: "Mama Don't Get Dressed Up for Nothing"
- Released: March 24, 1996
- Recorded: 1995
- Genre: Country
- Length: 3:30
- Label: Arista
- Songwriters: B. W. Stevenson; Daniel Moore
- Producers: Kix Brooks; Don Cook; Ronnie Dunn

Brooks & Dunn singles chronology
"Whiskey Under the Bridge" (1995)	"My Maria" (1996)	"I Am That Man" (1996)

Music video
- "My Maria" on YouTube

When country music duo Brooks & Dunn released a cover version of "My Maria" in 1996, the song reached No. 1 on the US country chart. Their version of the song appears on their album Borderline, released in 1996 on Arista Records and accompanied by a music video directed by South African filmmaker Michael Oblowitz. In addition, their version was the No. 1 country song of 1996 according to Billboard, and won the duo its second Grammy Award for Best Country Performance by a Vocal Group or Duo. Dunn subsequently claimed in an interview with Billboard later that year that he was initially reluctant to record "My Maria" because the duo had not previously recorded any cover songs.

In addition, this song was performed as their last performance before their initial split at the 2010 ACM Awards on April 18, 2010, as well at the 50th anniversary of the ACM Awards on April 19, 2015.

In 2019, Brooks & Dunn re-recorded "My Maria" with American country music artist Thomas Rhett for their album Reboot.

=== Chart history ===
"My Maria" debuted at number 30 on the U.S. Billboard Hot Country Songs chart for the week of April 6, 1996.

Chart (1996)	Peak position
Canada Country Singles (RPM)	1
US Billboard Hot 100	79
US Hot Country Songs (Billboard)	1

=== Year-end charts ===
Chart (1996)	Position
Canada Country Tracks (RPM)	12
US Country Songs (Billboard)	1

=== Certifications ===
Region	Certification	Certified units/sales
Canada (Music Canada)	3× Platinum	240,000^{‡}
United States (RIAA)	3× Platinum	3,000,000^{‡}
^{‡} Sales+streaming figures based on certification alone.

== See also ==
- List of 1970s one-hit wonders in the United States
