= Little Miss Honky Tonk =

Single by Brooks & Dunn

from the album Waitin' on Sundown
- B-side: "Silver and Gold"
- Released: February 13, 1995
- Genre: Country; rock and roll
- Length: 3:00
- Label: Arista 12790
- Songwriter: Ronnie Dunn
- Producers: Don Cook; Scott Hendricks

Brooks & Dunn singles chronology
"I'll Never Forgive My Heart" (1994)	"Little Miss Honky Tonk" (1995)	"You're Gonna Miss Me When I'm Gone" (1995)

"Little Miss Honky Tonk" is a song written by Ronnie Dunn, and recorded by American country music duo Brooks & Dunn. It was released in February 1995 as the third single from their album Waitin' on Sundown. The song reached the top of the Billboard Hot Country Singles & Tracks chart.

== Critical reception ==
Deborah Evans Price, of Billboard magazine reviewed the song favorably, calling it "an ode to a barroom queen." She goes on to say that it is a nice taste of the duo's rockier side and the first use of the phrase "buckle bunny" in a country song.

== Music video ==
The music video was directed by Sherman Halsey and premiered in early 1995. It features the duo as observers as a female mechanic sets out to be crowned "little miss honky tonk". Kix Brooks magically changes her car from a rusty station wagon to a sleek black chevy pickup and her clothes from dusty old rags to a polka dot dress using his guitar. At the event, she impresses the judges and wins the contest, and is escorted out by the whole bar in the end.

== Chart positions ==
"Little Miss Honky Tonk" debuted at number 70 on the U.S. Billboard Hot Country Singles & Tracks for the week of February 18, 1995.

Chart (1995)	Peak position
Canada Country Singles (RPM)	1
US Hot Country Songs (Billboard)	1

=== Year-end charts ===
Chart (1995)	Position
Canada Country Tracks (RPM)	67
US Country Songs (Billboard)	17
