= A Man This Lonely =

Single by Brooks & Dunn

from the album Borderline
- B-side: "One Heartache at a Time"
- Released: December 9, 1996
- Genre: Country
- Length: 3:34
- Label: Arista 13066
- Songwriters: Ronnie Dunn, Tommy Lee James
- Producers: Kix Brooks, Ronnie Dunn, Don Cook

Brooks & Dunn singles chronology
| "Mama Don't Get Dressed Up for Nothing" (1996) | "A Man This Lonely" (1996) | "Why Would I Say Goodbye" (1997) |

"A Man This Lonely" is a song written by Ronnie Dunn and Tommy Lee James, and recorded by American country music duo Brooks & Dunn. Dunn and James, who played guitar in Brooks & Dunn's backing band at the time, wrote the song while on tour in Canada. It was released in December 1996 as the fourth single from Brooks & Dunn's album Borderline. It reached number 1 on Billboard magazine's Hot Country Songs chart.

== Critical reception ==
Billboard reviewed the single favorably, saying that "the song boasts a solid lyric, and as usual Dunn wrings every drop of emotion out of each line".

== Music video ==
The video was directed by Michael Oblowitz. The video takes place at the CF Ranch in Alpine, Texas.

== Chart positions ==
"A Man This Lonely" debuted at number 51 on the U.S. Billboard Hot Country Songs chart for the week of December 7, 1996.

| Chart (1996–1997) | Peak position |
|---|---|
| Canada Country Singles (RPM) | 4 |
| US Bubbling Under Hot 100 (Billboard) | 24 |
| US Hot Country Songs (Billboard) | 1 |

=== Year-end charts ===
| Chart (1997) | Position |
|---|---|
| Canada Country Tracks (RPM) | 62 |
| US Country Songs (Billboard) | 26 |
