= She's Not the Cheatin' Kind =

Single by Brooks & Dunn

from the album Waitin' on Sundown
- B-side: "She's the Kind of Trouble"
- Released: August 16, 1994
- Genre: Honky-tonk
- Length: 3:27
- Label: Arista 12740
- Songwriter: Ronnie Dunn
- Producers: Don Cook; Scott Hendricks

Brooks & Dunn singles chronology
| "That Ain't No Way to Go" (1994) | "She's Not the Cheatin' Kind" (1994) | "I'll Never Forgive My Heart" (1994) |

"She's Not the Cheatin' Kind" is a song written by Ronnie Dunn and recorded by American country music duo Brooks & Dunn. It was released in August 1994 as the lead-off single from their album Waitin' on Sundown. The song reached the top of the Billboard Hot Country Singles & Tracks (now Hot Country Songs) chart, becoming the duo's seventh Number One single.

== Music video ==
The music video is mostly in black-and-white, and was directed by Piers Plowden and premiered in mid-1994.

== Chart positions ==
| Chart (1994) | Peak position |
|---|---|
| Canada Country Singles (RPM) | 1 |
| US Hot Country Songs (Billboard) | 1 |

=== Year-end charts ===
| Chart (1994) | Position |
|---|---|
| Canada Country Tracks (RPM) | 51 |
| US Country Songs (Billboard) | 61 |

== Certifications ==
| Region | Certification | Certified units/sales |
|---|---|---|
| United States (RIAA) | Platinum | 1,000,000^{‡} |
^{‡} Sales+streaming figures based on certification alone.
