= Daniel Moore (musician) =

American musician, singer and songwriter (born 1941)

- Born: 1941 (age 84–85); Walla Walla, Washington, U.S.
- Occupations: Musician, producer, songwriter
- Years active: 1962–present
- Label: DJM www.djmrec.com
- Website: www.danielmoorepublishing.com

Daniel Moore (born 1941) is an American musician, singer and songwriter.

He co-wrote the song "My Maria" with B. W. Stevenson. Recorded by the latter, the song was a pop hit in 1973. Moore also wrote the song "Shambala", a song which was a hit for both B. W. Stevenson and Three Dog Night that same year. "My Maria" was also a country hit in 1996 when recorded by Brooks and Dunn. In addition, Moore has written songs for other artists, including Joe Cocker and Bonnie Raitt.

In late 1975, he contributed backing vocals for the tracks on Bo Diddley's The 20th Anniversary of Rock 'n' Roll all-star album.

Moore currently runs his own record label, DJM Records. djmrec.com

As a songwriter, Moore has had songs recorded by:

- Joe Cocker, multiple songs
- The Everly Brothers, "Deliver Me" 1967
- Tom Scott, "Deliver Me" 1968
- The Hughes Corporation, "One More River to Cross" 1971
- B.W. Stevenson, "My Maria" 1973
- Three Dog Night, "Shambala" 1973
- Canned Heat, "One More River to Cross" 1973
- James and Bobby Purify, "Lay Me Down Easy" 1974
- Bobby Blue Bland, "Yolanda" 1974
- Bonnie Bramlet, "How Do I Love You" 1975
- Kenny Rogers, "Oregon" (Give Me Wings) 1975
- Solomon Burke, "Shambala" 1975
- Jennifer Warnes, "Bring Ol’ Maggie Back Home" 1976
- John Hartford & The Dillards, "Join the Old Refrain" 1976
- Bonnie Raitt, "Sweet Forgiveness" 1976
- Blood, Sweat & Tears, "Somebody I Trusted" (Put Out The Light) 1977
- Levon Helm, "Driving at Night" 1978
- Waylon Jennings, "Jack-A-Diamonds" 1978
- Thelma Houston, "Lost and Found" 1979
- Jerry Jeff Walker, "Cross the Borderline" 1982
- Kim Carnes, "Take Me Home to Where My Heart Is" 1984
- Maria Muldaur, "Lean Back Hold Steady"" 1986
- Colin James, "Crazy over You" 1990
- The Band, "Shine a Light" 1993
- The Dillards, "Let It Fly" 1994
- The Association, "Dreamland" 1995
- Brooks & Dunn, "My Maria" 1996
- Marsha Ball, "So Many Rivers to Cross" 2006
- Toby Keith, "Shambala" 2011

== Discography ==
- Daniel Moore - 1970
- Yosemite Wonderland - 1997
- Riding a Horse & Holding up the World - 1998
- Martin & Daniel - 2007
- The Giveaway - 2007
- Thoughts of a TV Chair - 2007
- Limited Parking - 2008
- The Wolf and the Chicken - 2009
- Maintain - 2009
