= B. W. Stevenson =

American singer (1949–1988)

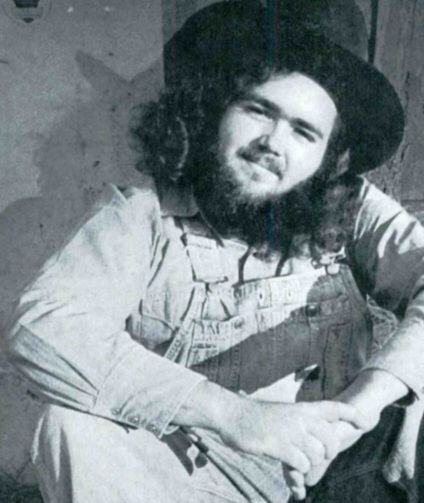
- Stevenson in 1972

Background information
- Also known as: Buckwheat Stevenson
- Born: Louis Charles Stevenson; October 5, 1949
- Origin: Dallas, Texas, U.S.
- Died: April 28, 1988 (age 38)
- Genres: Country pop; country rock
- Instruments: Vocals; guitar
- Years active: 1972–1988
- Labels: RCA Victor; Warner Bros.

Louis Charles "B. W." Stevenson (October 5, 1949 – April 28, 1988) (originally known as Buckwheat Stevenson) was an American country pop singer and musician. Stevenson was born in Dallas and attended W.H. Adamson High School with other musicians Michael Martin Murphey, Ray Wylie Hubbard, and Larry Groce.

Stevenson performed and was recorded for the intended pilot of Austin City Limits on October 13, 1974. However, the recording quality was deemed too poor to broadcast. Willie Nelson's performance taped the following night was aired as the first episode of the program.

== "My Maria" ==
Stevenson's biggest hit was "My Maria", co-written with Daniel Moore. Lindy Blaskey, Moore's music publisher at ABC/Dunhill Records heard Moore's one verse and chorus of "My Maria" but Moore thought it was too bubble-gum sounding. Blaskey gave the verse and chorus to Stevenson and asked him to write an additional verse. When finished, David Kershenbaum, Stevenson's producer at RCA Records, agreed with Blaskey that the song sounded like a hit. "My Maria" was No. 9 on the Billboard Hot 100 chart for the week ending September 29, 1973, and No. 3 in Canada. Among Stevenson's other singles are "The River of Love" (No. 53 / No. 49CAN), another Moore song; "Down to the Station" (No. 82 /No. 82CAN); and the original version of Daniel Moore's "Shambala" (No. 66). The better-known version of "Shambala" by Three Dog Night reached No. 3 and No. 4 in Canada.

Stevenson recorded a contemporary Christian album titled Lifeline, produced by Chris Christian, his neighbor in Beverly Hills, California, and it had success on Christian radio with the hit "Headin' Home". Stevenson's album Rainbow Down the Road was released posthumously and includes a duet with Willie Nelson on "Heart of the Country". Author Jan Reid devotes a chapter to Stevenson in his book The Improbable Rise of Redneck Rock, dubbing him "The Voice".

"My Maria" was posthumously re-popularized in 1996 when the song was covered by the country duo Brooks & Dunn on their fourth studio album Borderline, and reached Number 1 on the American and Canadian country charts that year, with this version winning Brooks & Dunn their second Grammy Award for Best Country Performance by a Vocal Group or Duo. Brooks & Dunn later re-recorded their version as a duet with fellow country singer Thomas Rhett on their 2019 album Reboot.

== Death ==
In April 1988, Stevenson went to the hospital to undergo heart valve surgery. He developed a staph infection and died on April 28, at 38. Since his death, Poor David's Pub in Dallas has held an annual songwriting competition in his memory.

== Discography ==
=== Albums ===
- 1972 B.W. Stevenson (RCA Victor) US 206
- 1972 Lead Free (RCA Victor)
- 1973 My Maria (RCA Victor) US 45
- 1974 Calabasas (RCA Victor) US 206
- 1975 We Be Sailin' (Warner Bros) US 201
- 1977 The Best of B.W. Stevenson (RCA Victor)
- 1977 Lost Feeling (Warner Bros)
- 1980 Lifeline (Home Sweet Home Records)
- 1990 Rainbow Down the Road (Amazing Records)
- 2000 Very Best of B.W. Stevenson (Collectables)
- 2003 Lead Free/B.W. Stevenson (Collectables)
- 2003 My Maria/Calabasas (Collectables)
- 2005 We Be Sailin'/Lost Feeling (Collectables)
- 2013 Southern Nights (Ameritz Music Ltd)
- 2018 Encore (Pedernales Records)

=== Singles ===
- 1972 Say What I Feel US 114 US AC 38
- 1973 Don't Go To Mexico US CB 118
- 1973 Shambala US 66 US AC 31
- 1973 My Maria US 9 US AC 1
- 1973 River of Love US 53 US AC 32
- 1974 Look for the Light US CB 111
- 1974 Little Bit of Understanding US CB 108 US AC 40
- 1977 Down to the Station US 82

== See also ==
- List of 1970s one-hit wonders in the United States
