= You're Gonna Miss Me When I'm Gone =

Single by Brooks & Dunn

from the album Waitin' on Sundown
- B-side: "If That's the Way You Want It"
- Released: June 12, 1995
- Genre: Country
- Length: 4:52
- Label: Arista 12831
- Songwriters: Kix Brooks; Don Cook; Ronnie Dunn
- Producers: Don Cook; Scott Hendricks

Brooks & Dunn singles chronology
"Little Miss Honky Tonk" (1995)	"You're Gonna Miss Me When I'm Gone" (1995)	"Whiskey Under the Bridge" (1995)

"You're Gonna Miss Me When I'm Gone" is a song co-written and recorded by American country music duo Brooks & Dunn. It was released in June 1995 as the fourth single from their third album Waitin' on Sundown. The song reached the top of the Billboard Hot Country Singles & Tracks chart. This is the third single to feature Kix Brooks on lead vocals instead of Ronnie Dunn, and the only single of such that was one of Brooks & Dunn's 20 Billboard No. 1 hits. The song was written by the duo along with Don Cook.

In 2019, Brooks & Dunn re-recorded "You're Gonna Miss Me When I'm Gone" with American country music artist Ashley McBryde for their album Reboot.

== Content ==
The male narrator explains to his significant other that she has constantly been mistreating him, and although he still shows great affection for her, he ultimately comes to the realization that their relationship is in serious jeopardy because of her actions and therefore contemplates ending the relationship for good. Beforehand, the narrator presents his soon-to-be former lover an opportunity to give him a farewell kiss, informing her that she will regret the mistakes that she had made and will miss him after he leaves her.

== Critical reception ==
Billboard's Eric Boehler praised the craftsmanship and production of the song, simply calling it "another welcome Brooks & Dunn outing." Deborah Evans Price, also of Billboard, reviewed the song favorably, calling it a welcome change of pace from their "typically terrific barn-burning honky-tonkers and affecting tear-in-the-beer ballads." She goes on to call it "excellent song craftsmanship with great production."

== Chart history ==
"You're Gonna Miss Me When I'm Gone" debuted at number 72 on the U.S. Billboard Hot Country Singles & Tracks for the week of June 10, 1995.

Chart (1995)	Peak position
Canada Country Singles (RPM)	1
US Hot Country Songs (Billboard)	1

=== Year-end charts ===
Chart (1995)	Position
Canada Country Tracks (RPM)	21
US Country Songs (Billboard)	13

== Certifications ==
Region	Certification	Certified units/sales
United States (RIAA)	Platinum	1,000,000^{‡}
^{‡} Sales+streaming figures based on certification alone.

== Cover versions ==
Country music singer Kenny Chesney covered the song during his Last Rodeo Tour.
