= Reboot II =

Studio album by Brooks & Dunn
- Released: November 15, 2024
- Genre: Country
- Label: Sony Nashville
- Producer: Shawn Camp; Jerry Douglas; Kristian Bush; Dann Huff; Joey Moi

Brooks & Dunn chronology
Reboot (2019)	Reboot II (2024)

Singles from Reboot II
- 1. "Believe" Released: December 9, 2024

Reboot II is the thirteenth studio album by American country music duo Brooks & Dunn. It is a follow-up to their 2019 album Reboot, featuring re-recordings of Brooks and Dunn's hit singles with guest vocals from other artists.

== History ==
In 2019, Brooks & Dunn released Reboot, which featured them re-recording existing songs of theirs with guest vocals from country music singers. Reboot II also comprises re-recordings, but unlike its predecessor, it features musicians from outside the country music genre. Among these are the Earls of Leicester on a bluegrass rendition of "How Long Gone", and rock band Halestorm on "Boot Scootin' Boogie". Dann Huff produced the album, with assistance from Joey Moi, Kristian Bush, and Jerry Douglas on some tracks. According to the duo, each collaborative artist was allowed creative input on which song they covered. The album precedes the duo's Neon Moon Tour, to begin in 2025.

== Track listing ==
No.	Title	Writer(s)	Producer(s)	Length
1.	"Play Something Country" (with Lainey Wilson)	Terry McBride; Ronnie Dunn	Dann Huff	3:48
2.	"Neon Moon" (with Morgan Wallen)	R. Dunn	Joey Moi	4:11
3.	"Rock My World (Little Country Girl)" (with Marcus King)	Bill LaBounty; Steve O'Brien	Huff	4:51
4.	"Ain't Nothing 'bout You" (with Megan Moroney)	Rivers Rutherford; Tom Shapiro	Kristian Bush	3:31
5.	"Brand New Man" (with Warren Zeiders)	Kix Brooks; R. Dunn; Don Cook	Huff	3:20
6.	"Believe" (with Jelly Roll)	R. Dunn; Craig Wiseman	Huff	4:56
7.	"She Used to Be Mine" (with Riley Green)	R. Dunn	Huff	3:41
8.	"She Likes to Get Out of Town" (with The Cadillac Three)	Brooks; Bob DiPiero	Huff	4:03
9.	"Boot Scootin' Boogie" (with Halestorm)	R. Dunn	Huff	2:56
10.	"That Ain't No Way to Go" (with Mitchell Tenpenny)	Brooks; R. Dunn; Cook	Huff	3:44
11.	"How Long Gone" (with The Earls of Leicester)	Shawn Camp; John Scott Sherrill	Camp; Jerry Douglas	3:56
12.	"I'll Never Forgive My Heart" (with Jake Worthington)	Dean Dillon; R. Dunn; Janine Dunn	Moi	3:23
13.	"She's Not the Cheatin' Kind" (with Hailey Whitters)	R. Dunn	Huff	3:55
14.	"Hard Workin' Man" (with Christone "Kingfish" Ingram)	R. Dunn	Huff	3:01
15.	"Hillbilly Deluxe" (with Hardy)	Wiseman; Brad Crisler	Moi	3:28
16.	"Indian Summer" (with Ernest)	Brooks; R. Dunn; DiPiero	Moi	4:15
17.	"Drop in the Bucket" (with A Thousand Horses)	Brooks; DiPiero	Huff	4:46
18.	"Only in America" (with Corey Kent)	Brooks; Cook; Ronnie Rogers	Huff	3:52

== Personnel ==
Brooks & Dunn

- Kix Brooks – background vocals (tracks 1–14, 16–18), harmonica (3, 8, 17), lead vocals (8)
- Ronnie Dunn – lead vocals (tracks 1, 2, 4–7, 9–12, 14–18), background vocals (1, 4–6, 9, 13)

Additional musicians

- Jimmie Lee Sloas – bass (tracks 1, 2, 10, 12, 13, 15, 16)
- Justin Niebank – programming (tracks 1, 3–10, 13, 14, 17, 18)
- Josh Reedy – background vocals (tracks 1, 3, 5, 7, 9, 10, 13, 14, 17, 18)
- Alex Wright – synthesizer (tracks 1, 5, 10, 13, 18), organ (1, 5, 10, 18), piano (1, 10, 18), keyboards (15)
- Ilya Toshinskiy – Dobro (track 1), electric guitar (5, 10), acoustic guitar (10, 13, 18), bouzouki (13), banjo (17, 18)
- Dann Huff – electric guitar (tracks 1, 6, 8–10, 14, 18); mandolin, slide guitar (10); 12-string guitar (13)
- Rob McNelley – electric guitar (tracks 1, 7, 10, 13, 18)
- Paul Franklin – steel guitar (tracks 1, 7, 13), pedal steel guitar (12, 16)
- David Huff – programming (tracks 1, 8, 10, 13)
- Aaron Sterling – drums (tracks 1, 10, 13, 18), percussion (1, 13), tambourine (10, 18)
- Stuart Duncan – fiddle (tracks 1, 13)
- Lainey Wilson – lead vocals (track 1)
- Dave Cohen – keyboards (track 2), piano (12, 16)
- Jerry Roe – drums (tracks 2, 5, 12, 15)
- Bryan Sutton – acoustic guitar (tracks 2, 12, 16)
- Wes Hightower – background vocals (tracks 2, 12, 16)
- Tom Bukovac – electric guitar (track 2)
- Morgan Wallen – lead vocals (track 2)
- Marcus King – lead vocals, electric guitar (track 3)
- Stephen Campbell – bass guitar (track 3)
- Jack Ryan – drums (track 3)
- Drew Smithers – electric guitar (track 3)
- Mike Runyon – organ, piano (track 3)
- Chris Spies – saxophone (track 3)
- Kyle Snuffer – trombone (track 3)
- Alex Bradley – trumpet (track 3)
- Megan Moroney – lead vocals, background vocals (track 4)
- Kristian Bush – acoustic guitar, mandolin (track 4)
- Brandon Bush – organ, piano, synthesizer (track 4)
- Ted Pecchio – bass guitar (track 4)
- Travis McNabb – drums (track 4)
- Justin Schipper – steel guitar (track 4)
- Mark Hill – bass (tracks 5–7, 18)
- Derek Wells – electric guitar (tracks 5, 6, 15)
- Warren Zeiders – lead vocals (track 5)
- Dan Dugmore – steel guitar (track 5)
- Chris McHugh – drums (tracks 6, 7), tambourine (7)
- Gordon Mote – organ, piano (tracks 6, 7)
- Jelly Roll – lead vocals (track 6)
- Denise Carite – background vocals (track 6)
- Everett Drake – background vocals (track 6)
- Jamar Carter – background vocals (track 6)
- Kyla Harris – background vocals (track 6)
- Michael Mishaw – background vocals (track 6)
- Robert Bailey – background vocals (track 6)
- Vicki Hampton – background vocals (track 6)
- Wendy Moten – background vocals (track 6)
- Craig Nelson – bass (track 6)
- Joel Reist – bass (track 6)
- Andrew Dunn – cello (track 6)
- Austin Hoke – cello (track 6)
- Kevin Bate – cello (track 6)
- Sari Reist – cello (track 6)
- Luke Simonson – English horn, oboe (track 6)
- Erik Gratton – flute (track 6)
- Anna Spina – French horn (track 6)
- Beth Beeson – French horn (track 6)
- Jennifer Kummer – French horn (track 6)
- Patrick Walle – French horn (track 6)
- Rachel Miller – harp (track 6)
- Kristin Wilkinson – percussion (track 6)
- Barry Green – trombone (track 6)
- Matt Jeferson – trombone (track 6)
- Roy Agee – trombone (track 6)
- Steve Patrick – trumpet (track 6)
- Neil Konouchi – tuba (track 6)
- Chris Farrell – viola (track 6)
- Elizabeth Lamb – viola (track 6)
- Monisa Angell – viola (track 6)
- Seanad Chang – viola (track 6)
- Ali Hoffman – violin (track 6)
- Annaliese Kowert – violin (track 6)
- Carrie Bailey – violin (track 6)
- David Angell – violin (track 6)
- David Davidson – violin (track 6)
- Janet Darnall – violin (track 6)
- Jenny Bifano – violin (track 6)
- Jung-Min Shin – violin (track 6)
- Karen Winkelmann – violin (track 6)
- Mary Kathryn Vanosdale – violin (track 6)
- Rachel Englander – violin (track 6)
- Wei Tsun Chang – violin (track 6)
- Todd Lombardo – acoustic guitar (track 7)
- Riley Green – lead vocals (track 7)
- Jaren Johnston – lead vocals, acoustic guitar, background vocals, banjo, programming, synthesizer (track 8)
- Neil Mason – drums, percussion (track 8)
- Kelby Ray – slide guitar, steel guitar (track 8)
- Lzzy Hale – lead vocals, electric guitar (track 9)
- Josh Smith – bass (track 9)
- Arejay Hale – drums (track 9)
- Joe Hottinger – electric guitar (track 9)
- Mitchell Tenpenny – lead vocals (track 10)
- Shawn Camp – lead vocals, electric guitar (track 11)
- Jeff White – background vocals, tenor (track 11)
- Charlie Cushman – banjo (track 11)
- Daniel Kimbro – bass (track 11)
- Jerry Douglas – Dobro (track 11)
- Johnny Warren – fiddle (track 11)
- Larry Franklin – fiddle (tracks 12, 16)
- Jake Worthington – lead vocals (track 12)
- Brent Mason – electric guitar (track 12)
- Hailey Whitters – lead vocals (track 13)
- Christone "Kingfish" Ingram – lead vocals, electric guitar (track 14)
- Deshawn Alexander – organ, piano (track 14)
- Paul Rogers – bass (track 14)
- Chris Black – drums (track 14)
- Hardy – lead vocals, background vocals (track 15)
- Ernest – lead vocals (track 16)
- Michael Hobby – lead vocals (track 17)
- Bill Satcher – acoustic guitar, electric guitar (track 17)
- Graham DeLoach – bass (track 17)
- Nathan Sexton – drums, percussion (track 17)
- Adam Browder – electric guitar (track 17)
- Jimmy Wallace – organ, piano (track 17)
- Corey Kent – lead vocals (track 18)

Technical

- Adam Ayan – mastering (tracks 1, 3–11, 13, 14, 17, 18)
- Ted Jensen – mastering (tracks 2, 12, 15, 16)
- Justin Niebank – mixing (tracks 1, 3–10, 13, 14, 17, 18), engineering (7, 9)
- Drew Bollman – mixing (tracks 1, 4–10, 13, 14, 17, 18), engineering (1, 3, 8, 10, 13, 17, 18)
- Joey Moi – mixing (tracks 2, 15), vocal engineering (2, 15, 16)
- Gary Paczosa – mixing, engineering (track 11)
- Olle Romo – mixing (track 12)
- Chuck Ainlay – mixing (track 16), vocal engineering (12)
- Josh Ditty – engineering, editing (tracks 2, 12, 15, 16)
- Buckley Miller – engineering (tracks 4, 14)
- Steve Marcantonio – engineering (track 6), overdub engineering (6, 17)
- Chip Matthews – vocal production, vocal engineering
- Mike Kyle – vocal production, vocal engineering
- Josh Reedy – overdub engineering (tracks 1, 3, 5, 7, 9, 10, 13, 14, 17, 18)
- Luke Campolieta – overdub engineering (track 4)
- Jordan Pratt – overdub engineering (track 6)
- Chris Small – editing (tracks 1, 3–9, 13, 14, 17, 18)
- David Huff – editing (tracks 1, 3–9, 13, 14, 17, 18)
- Ryan Yount – editing, engineering assistance (tracks 2, 12, 15, 16)
- Eivind Nordland – editing (tracks 2, 12, 15, 16)
- Scott Cooke – editing (tracks 2, 12, 15, 16)
- Joel McKenney – engineering assistance (tracks 1, 3, 8, 13, 17)
- Katelyn Prieboy – engineering assistance (tracks 2, 6, 16)
- Michael Walter – engineering assistance (tracks 4, 6)
- Joey Stanca – engineering assistance (tracks 5, 7, 9)
- Wolf Robinson – engineering assistance (track 12)
- Zach Kuhlman – engineering assistance (track 14)
- Seth Morton – engineering assistance (track 17)
- Sean Badum – engineering assistance (track 18)
- Kristin Wilkinson – arrangement (track 6)
- Mike "Frog" Griffith – project coordination (tracks 1, 3–10, 13, 14, 17, 18)
- Ally Gecewicz – project coordination (tracks 2, 12, 15, 16)
- Reilly O'Connell – project coordination (tracks 2, 12, 15, 16)

== Charts ==
Chart performance for Reboot II
Chart (2024)	Peak position
Australian Country Albums (ARIA)	16
Canadian Albums (Billboard)	61
UK Album Downloads (OCC)	64
UK Country Albums (OCC)	12
US Billboard 200	25
US Top Country Albums (Billboard)	5
