= 2006 Country Music Association Awards =

Annual US music awards ceremony

- Date: November 6, 2006
- Location: Gaylord Entertainment Center, Nashville, Tennessee, U.S.
- Hosted by: Brooks & Dunn

Highlights
- Most wins: Brooks & Dunn (3)
- Most nominations: Brooks & Dunn; Brad Paisley (6 each)

Television/radio coverage
- Network: ABC

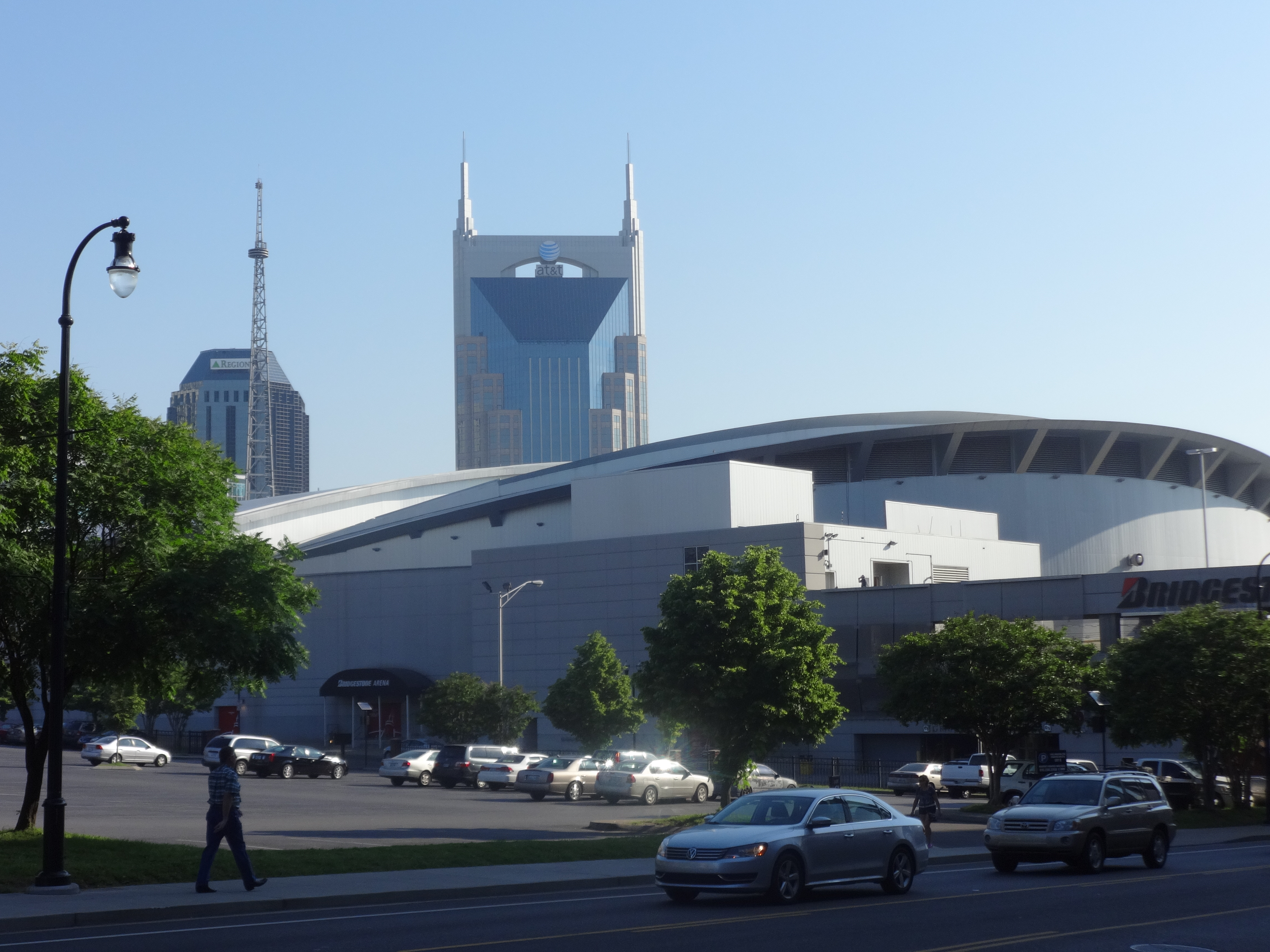
The former, Gaylord Entertainment Center in Nashville, Tennessee.

The 2006 Country Music Association Award, 40th Annual Ceremony, took place on November 6, 2006, and was the first ceremony to be held at the Gaylord Entertainment Center (later known as Bridgestone Arena) in Nashville, Tennessee. This was also the first ceremony to be broadcast live from ABC. Brooks & Dunn and Brad Paisley led with 6 nominations each including Album of the Year and Entertainer of the Year.

== Winners and Nominees ==
Entertainer of the Year	Album of the Year
Kenny Chesney; Brooks & Dunn; Rascal Flatts; Brad Paisley; Keith Urban	Time Well Wasted — Brad Paisley; Hillbilly Deluxe — Brooks & Dunn; Me and My Gang — Rascal Flatts; Precious Memories — Alan Jackson; The Road and the Radio — Kenny Chesney
Male Vocalist of the Year	Female Vocalist of the Year
Keith Urban; Dierks Bentley; Kenny Chesney; Alan Jackson; Brad Paisley	Carrie Underwood; Sara Evans; Faith Hill; Martina McBride; Gretchen Wilson
Vocal Group of the Year	Vocal Duo of the Year
Rascal Flatts; Alison Krauss & Union Station (feat. Jerry Douglas); Little Big Town; Lonestar; Sugarland	Brooks & Dunn; Big & Rich; Montgomery Gentry; Van Zant; The Wreckers
Single of the Year	Song of the Year
“Believe” — Brooks & Dunn; “Better Life” — Keith Urban; “Jesus, Take the Wheel” — Carrie Underwood; “Summertime” — Kenny Chesney; “When I Get Where I'm Going” — Brad Paisley and Dolly Parton	“Believe” — Craig Wiseman and Ronnie Dunn; “8th of November” — Big Kenny and John Rich; “Jesus, Take the Wheel” — Hillary Lindsey, Brett James, and Gordie Sampson; “Tonight I Wanna Cry” — Keith Urban and Monty Powell; “When I Get Where I’m Going” — Rivers Rutherford and George Teren
Horizon Award	Musician of the Year
Carrie Underwood; Miranda Lambert; Little Big Town; Sugarland; Josh Turner	Randy Scruggs – Guitar; Eddie Bayers – Drums; Jerry Douglas – Dobro; Paul Franklin – Steel Guitar; Dann Huff – Guitar; Brent Mason – Guitar/Electric Guitar
Music Video of the Year	Musical Event of the Year
“Believe” — Brooks & Dunn; “8th of November” — Big & Rich; “Jesus, Take the Wheel” — Carrie Underwood; “Kerosene” — Miranda Lambert; “When I Get Where I’m Going” — Brad Paisley (feat. Dolly Parton)	“When I Get Where I’m Going” — Brad Paisley and Dolly Parton; “Building Bridges” — Brooks & Dunn, Sheryl Crow and Vince Gill; “Like We Never Loved at All” — Faith Hill and Tim McGraw; “Politically Uncorrect” — Gretchen Wilson and Merle Haggard; “Who Says You Can’t Go Home” — Bon Jovi and Jennifer Nettles

== Hall of Fame ==
Country Music Hall of Fame
- George Strait
- Sonny James
- Harold Bradley

== Performers and presenters ==
Performers

Artist(s)	Song(s)
Brooks & Dunn; Vince Gill; Sheryl Crow	"Building Bridges"
Carrie Underwood	"Before He Cheats"
Brad Paisley	"She's Everything"
Sugarland	"Settlin'"
Gretchen Wilson; John Rich	"Come to Bed"
Alan Jackson	"Like Red on a Rose"
Little Big Town	"Bones"
Rascal Flatts	"My Wish"
Martina McBride	"Anyway"
George Strait	"Give It Away"
Kenny Chesney	"You Save Me"
The Wreckers	"Leave the Pieces"
Dierks Bentley	"Every Mile a Memory"
Miranda Lambert	"Crazy Ex-Girlfriend"
Faith Hill	"Stealing Kisses"
Josh Turner	"Would You Go with Me"
Jason Aldean	"Hicktown"
Sara Evans	"A Real Fine Place to Start"
Vince Gill; Sheryl Crow; Amy Grant; Jennifer Gill	"What You Give Away"

Presenters

Presenter(s)	Award
LeAnn Rimes, Jon Bon Jovi, Richie Sambora	Single of the Year
Lee Ann Womack and Cameron Mathison	Song of the Year
Gary Allan and Kimberly Williams-Paisley	Vocal Group of the Year
Kris Kristofferson	George Strait
Trisha Yearwood and James Denton	Vocal Duo of the Year
Eva Longoria	Male Vocalist of the Year
Kellie Pickler and Billy Currington	Horizon Award
Billy Ray Cyrus and Miley Cyrus	Female Vocalist of the Year
Montgomery Gentry	Album of the Year
Barbara Mandrell	Entertainer of the Year
