= Hillbilly Deluxe =

Hillbilly Deluxe may refer to:

- Hillbilly Deluxe (Dwight Yoakam album), released in 1987
- Hillbilly Deluxe (Brooks & Dunn album), released in 2005

- "Hillbilly Deluxe" (song), a single from this album

== See also ==
- Hellbilly Deluxe, a 1998 album by Rob Zombie
