= Hard Workin' Man =

Album by Brooks & Dunn

Studio album by Brooks & Dunn
- Released: February 23, 1993
- Recorded: 1992–1993
- Studios: Sound Shop (Nashville, Tennessee); The Castle (Franklin, Tennessee)
- Genre: Country
- Length: 42:47
- Label: Arista
- Producers: Don Cook; Scott Hendricks; "Boot Scootin' Boogie (Club Mix)" produced by Don Cook, Scott Hendricks, and Brian Tankersley

Brooks & Dunn chronology
Brand New Man (1991)	Hard Workin' Man (1993)	Waitin' on Sundown (1994)

Singles from Hard Workin' Man
- 1. "Hard Workin' Man" Released: February 1, 1993; 2. "We'll Burn That Bridge" Released: May 3, 1993; 3. "She Used to Be Mine" Released: August 30, 1993; 4. "Rock My World (Little Country Girl)" Released: December 6, 1993; 5. "That Ain't No Way to Go" Released: March 28, 1994

Professional ratings
Review scores
Source	Rating
Allmusic	3.5/5 stars
Entertainment Weekly	C

Hard Workin' Man is the second studio album by American country music duo Brooks & Dunn. Like its predecessor, Brand New Man, the album had a string of top 5 hits on the US Hot Country chart. Its singles were "Hard Workin' Man" (number 4), "Rock My World (Little Country Girl)" (number 2), "She Used to Be Mine" (number 1), "We'll Burn That Bridge" (number 2), and "That Ain't No Way to Go" (number 1). The album also featured a remixed dance version of the country number-one hit "Boot Scootin' Boogie", from the previous album.

== Track listing ==
No.	Title	Writer(s)	Length
1.	"Hard Workin' Man"	Ronnie Dunn	2:58
2.	"We'll Burn That Bridge"	Dunn; Don Cook	2:57
3.	"Mexican Minutes"	Jim Messina; Kent Robbins	3:40
4.	"Heartbroke Out of My Mind"	Dunn	3:25
5.	"She Used to Be Mine"	Dunn	3:56
6.	"Rock My World (Little Country Girl)"	Bill LaBounty; Steve O'Brien	3:42
7.	"That Ain't No Way to Go"	Kix Brooks; Dunn; Cook	3:37
8.	"Texas Women (Don't Stay Lonely Long)"	Brooks	3:39
9.	"Our Time Is Coming"	Brooks; Dunn	4:39
10.	"I Can't Put Out This Fire"	Brooks; Dunn	3:39
11.	"Boot Scootin' Boogie (Club Mix)"	Dunn	6:29

== Chart performance ==
=== Weekly charts ===
Chart (1993)	Peak position
Canadian Albums (RPM)	41
Canadian Country Albums (RPM)	1
US Billboard 200	9
US Top Country Albums (Billboard)	2

=== Year-end charts ===
Chart (1993)	Position
US Billboard 200	51
US Top Country Albums (Billboard)	10
Chart (1994)	Position
US Billboard 200	73
US Top Country Albums (Billboard)	9
Chart (1995)	Position
US Top Country Albums (Billboard)	50

== Certifications ==
Region	Certification	Certified units/sales
Canada (Music Canada)	3× Platinum	300,000^{^}
United States (RIAA)	5× Platinum	5,000,000^{^}
^{^} Shipments figures based on certification alone.

== Personnel ==
Brooks & Dunn

- Kix Brooks – lead vocals on tracks 3, 6, 8, 10 and backing vocals
- Ronnie Dunn – lead vocals on tracks 1, 2, 4, 5, 7, 9 and backing vocals

Additional musicians

- Arista Tabernacle Choir – choir
- Bruce Bouton – pedal steel guitar
- Mark Casstevens - acoustic guitar, mandolin
- Jimmy Gunn – cabasa
- Rob Hajacos – fiddle
- Terry McMillan – harmonica
- Scott Hendricks – cowbell
- John Barlow Jarvis – piano, organ
- Bill LaBounty – background vocals
- Dan McBride – electric guitar
- Brent Mason – electric guitar
- Jim Messina – backing vocals on "Mexican Minutes"
- Danny Parks – acoustic guitar
- John Wesley Ryles – backing vocals
- Harry Stinson – backing vocals
- Dennis Wilson – backing vocals
- Lonnie Wilson – drums
- Glenn Worf – bass guitar
