= 100 Proof Neon =

Studio album by Ronnie Dunn
- Released: July 29, 2022
- Studio: Blackbird Studio (Berry Hill, Tennessee)
- Genre: Country
- Length: 37:36
- Label: Little Will-E
- Producer: Ronnie Dunn

Ronnie Dunn chronology
| Re-Dunn (2020) | 100 Proof Neon (2022) |

Singles from 100 Proof Neon
- 1. "Broken Neon Hearts" Released: February 11, 2022

100 Proof Neon is the fifth solo studio album by American country music artist Ronnie Dunn. The album was released on July 29, 2022, via Little Will-E Records (LWR). It is the first album to be solely produced by Dunn since his 2011 self-titled debut solo album.

== Background ==
Dunn first teased the album in February 2022, Dunn said in an interview with Billboard. "They didn't care if it was the best band or not—they looked at the tab at the end of the night, and that's the band they hired back."

Dunn noted that the COVID-19 pandemic gave him the time and space to finally make the kind of record he'd always wanted to.

In May 2022, Dunn officially announced the July 29 release date via Little Will-E Records (LWR).

Dunn co-wrote seven of the album's eleven tracks. "Road to Abilene" draws heavily from Dunn's own college days in Abilene, Texas, when he attended Abilene Christian University. "We used to call it the belt buckle of the Baptist Belt of West Texas...I just got into painting this picture of the music scene in Abilene and dodging the religious, church ethos of the school I went to—and trying to paint pictures of that eternal wind that blows." Dunn also collaborated with Jake Worthington on "Honky Tonk Town", with Dunn praising Worthington's authenticity, comparing his voice to Lefty Frizzell. Dunn also covered "The Blade," the title track to Ashley Monroe's Grammy-nominated album The Blade written by Marc Beeson, Jamie Floyd, and Allen Shamblin.

== Singles ==
On February 11, 2022, Dunn released the first single, "Broken Neon Hearts." The single was described by Whiskey Riff's Casey Young as a "straight up honky tonk heater." It was written by Dunn alongside Matt Willis and Thomas Perkins. Alongside announcing the album's release date, Dunn released the promotional single "Honky Tonk Town" which featured Jake Worthington.

== Track listing ==
| No. | Title | Writer(s) | Length |
|---|---|---|---|
| 1. | "Broken Neon Hearts" | Ronnie Dunn; Thomas Perkins; Matt Willis | 3:21 |
| 2. | "Honky Tonk Town" (featuring Jake Worthington) | David Chamberlain; Dunn; Robert Howett; Jacob Lyda | 2:59 |
| 3. | "Two Steppers, Waltzes, and Shuffles" | Dunn | 3:03 |
| 4. | "She's Why I Drink Whiskey" | Shawn Camp; Dunn; Terry McBride | 3:31 |
| 5. | "Where the Neon Lies" | Chris DuBois; Lynn Hutton; Triston Marez | 3:57 |
| 6. | "The Blade" | Marc Beeson; Jamie Floyd; Allen Shamblin | 3:30 |
| 7. | "If Love Ever Comes My Way Again" | Brett Beavers; Jim Beavers; Drake Milligan | 3:10 |
| 8. | "Somethin' I Can't Have" | Dean Dillon; Dunn; Scotty Emerick | 3:42 |
| 9. | "Honk Tonk Skin" | Ira Dean; Dunn; Chris Wallin | 3:10 |
| 10. | "Road to Abilene" (featuring Parker McCollum) | Dunn | 4:00 |
| 11. | "Good Bartender" | Bob DiPiero; Lee Thomas Miller; Josh Thompson | 3:08 |
| Total length: | | | 37:36 |

== Charts ==
| Chart (2022) | Peak position |
|---|---|
| US Top Country Albums (Billboard) | 49 |
