= Brand New Man (song) =

Single by Brooks & Dunn

from the album Brand New Man
- B-side: "I'm No Good"
- Released: June 10, 1991
- Recorded: 1990
- Genre: Country
- Length: 2:59
- Label: Arista AS-2232
- Songwriters: Kix Brooks; Don Cook; Ronnie Dunn
- Producers: Don Cook; Scott Hendricks

Brooks & Dunn singles chronology
"Brand New Man" (1991)	"My Next Broken Heart" (1991)

"Brand New Man" is a song recorded by American country music duo Brooks & Dunn, written by Kix Brooks, Don Cook and Ronnie Dunn. It was released in June 1991 as their debut single, and was served as the first single and title track from their debut album of the same name, and their first Number One single on the country charts, thus making them only the second country music band in history to have its debut single reach Number One on the Billboard Hot Country Singles & Tracks chart (behind Diamond Rio's "Meet in the Middle" from three months earlier).

In 2019, Brooks & Dunn re-recorded "Brand New Man" with American country music singer Luke Combs for their album, Reboot. This version peaked at number 42 on the Billboard Country Airplay chart, and at number 30 on the Billboard Hot Country Songs chart. In 2024, they re-recorded this song with American country music singer Warren Zeiders for their album, Reboot II.

== Content ==
The song's narrator is telling his lover that he is a "brand new man" thanks to her.

== Cover versions ==
Country music singer Keith Urban covered the song from The Last Rodeo Tour.

== Music video ==
The music video for this song features Brooks & Dunn singing the song at a concert. Scenes also feature the duo singing and playing guitar in a desert, and them drinking at local bars. The video was directed by Michael Merriman. Both this and the video for "My Next Broken Heart," were shot in the same Texas town, featured the same actress, and filmed at the same time.

== Chart positions ==
"Brand New Man" debuted on the U.S. Billboard Hot Country Singles & Tracks for the week of June 22, 1991.

Chart (1991)	Peak position
Canada Country Singles (RPM)	1
US Hot Country Songs (Billboard)	1
Chart (2019)	Peak position
Canada Country (Billboard)	40
US Country Airplay (Billboard)	42
US Hot Country Songs (Billboard)	30

=== Year-end charts ===
Chart (1991)	Position
Canada Country Tracks (RPM)	63
US Country Songs (Billboard)	34

== Certifications ==
Certifications for "Brand New Man"
Region	Certification	Certified units/sales
United States (RIAA)	Platinum	1,000,000^{‡}
with Luke Combs
Australia (ARIA)	Platinum	70,000^{‡}
Canada (Music Canada)	2× Platinum	160,000^{‡}
United States (RIAA)	Platinum	1,000,000^{‡}
^{‡} Sales+streaming figures based on certification alone.
