= She Used to Be Mine (disambiguation) =

She Used to Be Mine, 2017 song by Sara Bareilles.

She Used to Be Mine may refer to:

- "She Used to Be Mine" (Brooks & Dunn song), 1993 song by Ronnie Dunn
- "My Best Friend's Girl" (song), by The Cars, from their 1978 self-titled debut album
