= Re-Dunn =

Studio album by Ronnie Dunn
- Released: January 10, 2020
- Studio: Blackbird Studio and Ro's Barn (Nashville, Tennessee); The Castle (Franklin, Tennessee)
- Genre: Country
- Length: 88:01
- Label: Little Will-E
- Producer: Ronnie Dunn

Ronnie Dunn chronology
Tattooed Heart (2016)	Re-Dunn (2020)	100 Proof Neon (2022)

Singles from Re-Dunn
- 1. "Amarillo by Morning" Released: September 6, 2019; 2. "Long Cool Woman in a Black Dress" Released: September 6, 2019

Re-Dunn is the fourth solo studio album by American country music artist Ronnie Dunn. The album was released January 10, 2020, via LWR. The album is a 24-song project that features covers that have left an impact on Dunn, with him calling it a "passion project".

Following the album's announcement in September 2019, two songs, one country and one rock, were issued each month until the release date.

== Background ==
Recording for the album began in 2018 at Dunn's home studio. The idea initially was planned as a rock covers project. Dunn had already recorded two dozen rock songs in 2018 while he was working on the Brooks & Dunn album Reboot; however, once that project was finished, he decided to throw in some country songs. Many of the musicians that worked on the album Dunn has worked with in the past and knew of their capabilities, making the recording process more of a fun jam session.

== Commercial performance ==
The album has sold 10,100 copies in the United States as of March 2020.

== Track listing ==
Re-Dunn track listing
No.	Title	Writer(s)	Length
1.	"Amarillo by Morning"	Paul Fraser, Terry Stafford	2:48
2.	"Long Cool Woman in a Black Dress"	Allan Clarke, Roger Cook, Roger Greenaway	3:36
3.	"That's How I Got to Memphis"	Tom T. Hall	3:04
4.	"It Never Rains in Southern California"	Albert Hammond, Mike Hazlewood	4:18
5.	"How Long"	Paul Carrack	3:26
6.	"Drinkin' Thing"	Wayne Carson	3:29
7.	"Together Again"	Buck Owens	2:44
8.	"Peaceful Easy Feeling"	Jack Tempchin	4:18
9.	"Against the Wind"	Bob Seger	4:26
10.	"If You Don't Know Me by Now"	Kenny Gamble, Leon Huff	3:26
11.	"I Won't Back Down"	Tom Petty, Jeff Lynne	3:03
12.	"The Cowboy Rides Away"	Sonny Throckmorton, Casey Kelly	3:24
13.	"Showdown"	Jeff Lynne	4:06
14.	"Wonderful Tonight"	Eric Clapton	3:37
15.	"Ashes by Now"	Rodney Crowell	4:17
16.	"That's the Way Love Goes"	Lefty Frizzell, Sanger D. Shafer	3:02
17.	"I'm Not in Love"	Eric Stewart, Graham Gouldman	4:45
18.	"Brown Eyed Girl"	Van Morrison	3:38
19.	"You Don't Know Me"	Eddy Arnold, Cindy Walker	4:22
20.	"Ridin' My Thumb to Mexico"	Johnny Rodriguez	3:18
21.	"A Showman's Life"	Jesse Winchester	4:45
22.	"Good Time Charlie's Got the Blues"	Danny O'Keefe	3:13
23.	"Amie"	Craig Fuller	4:10
24.	"I Can't Help It (If I'm Still in Love with You)"	Hank Williams	2:46
Total length:			88:01

== Personnel ==
Adapted from liner notes.

- Ronnie Dunn – lead vocals
- Charlie Judge – keyboards (1–3, 5–8, 10–16, 18, 20, 23, 24), synthesizers (2, 11, 17), Hammond B3 organ (3, 4, 6, 7, 9, 11, 15, 16, 20, 22, 23), Wurlitzer electric piano (4, 22), acoustic piano (9), programming (10), bass (10), drums (10), percussion (10), strings (13)
- Dwayne Rowe – keyboards (19), Hammond B3 organ (19)
- Mike "Juice" Kyle – keyboards (21), Hammond B3 organ (21)
- Jeff King – electric guitar (1, 3, 5–8, 10, 12–16, 18, 20, 23, 24)
- Brent Mason – electric guitar (1, 3, 5–8, 12–16, 18, 20, 23, 24)
- Pat McGrath – acoustic guitar (1, 3, 6, 7, 12, 15, 16, 20, 23, 24), mandolin (23)
- Kenny Greenberg – electric guitar (2, 4, 9, 11, 17, 22), acoustic guitar (11), baritone guitar (22)
- Jerry McPherson – electric guitar (2, 4, 11), acoustic guitar (9, 11, 17, 22)
- Chris Rodriguez – acoustic guitar (5, 8, 13, 14, 18), electric guitar (21)
- Lou Toomey – electric guitar (19)
- Paul Franklin – steel guitar (1, 6, 12, 16, 20, 24)
- Gary Morse – steel guitar (3–5, 7, 8, 10, 11, 13–15, 17, 18, 23)
- Dan Dugmore – steel guitar (9, 17, 22)
- Mark Hill – bass (1, 3, 5–8, 12–16, 18, 20, 23, 24)
- Glenn Worf – bass (2, 4, 9, 11, 17, 22)
- Robbie Harrington – bass (19)
- Dow Tomlin – bass (21)
- Greg Morrow – drums (1–4, 6, 7, 9, 11, 12, 15–17, 20, 22–24), percussion (1–4, 6, 7, 11, 12, 15–17, 20, 23, 24), tambourine (9, 17, 22), bongo (22), claves (22), shaker (22)
- Chad Cromwell – drums (5, 8, 13, 14, 18)
- Trey Gray – drums (19)
- Neil Kyle – drums (21)
- Perry Coleman – backing vocals (1, 3, 5, 6, 8, 12, 13, 15, 18, 20, 24)
- Tania Hancheroff – backing vocals (1, 3, 5, 6, 8, 12–16, 18, 20, 24)
- Bob Bailey – backing vocals (10)
- Kim Fleming – backing vocals (10)
- Vicki Hampton – backing vocals (10)
- Chip Davis – backing vocals (23)

== Production ==
- Ronnie Dunn – producer
- Steve Marcantonio – recording, mixing
- Seth Morton – recording
- Jordan Reed – recording
- Mike Kyle – vocal recording, vocal editing
- Melanie Robertson – production assistant
- Braden Carney – album design
- Steve Martine – photography

== Charts ==
Sales chart performance for Re-Dunn
Chart (2020)	Peak position
Australian Digital Albums (ARIA)	11
US Billboard 200	169
US Top Country Albums (Billboard)	17

== See also ==
- List of 2020 albums
