= Peace Love and Country Music =

Studio album by Ronnie Dunn
- Released: April 8, 2014
- Genre: Country; country rock
- Length: 53:06
- Label: Little Will-E
- Producer: Ronnie Dunn, Jeff Balding

Ronnie Dunn chronology
Ronnie Dunn (2011)	Peace Love and Country Music (2014)	Tattooed Heart (2016)

Singles from Peace Love and Country Music
- 1. "Kiss You There" Released: June 4, 2013; 2. "I Wish I Still Smoked Cigarettes" Released: November 19, 2013

Peace Love and Country Music is the second solo studio album by country music artist Ronnie Dunn. The album was released on April 8, 2014, via Dunn's own record label Little Will-E Records. Peace Love and Country Music is Dunn's first solo release since his 2011 self-titled album released on Arista Nashville.

The lead off single for the album was "Kiss You There". It was released to radio on June 4, 2013, though a joint effort between Dunn's Little Will-E Records and HitShop Records. The single charted #60 on the Billboards Country Airplay Charts. Following an unsuccessful radio run, LWR and HitShop parted ways. The second single from the album, "I Wish I Still Smoked Cigarettes", was released on iTunes on November 19, 2013. After the single's release, Dunn sat out on a small radio tour to promote the single.

== Background ==
Following two top 20 singles from Dunn's self-titled debut solo album, the third single, "Let the Cowboy Rock" was released in January 2012. The single stalled at #31 on the Country charts and Dunn asked his fans through Facebook what they thought the fourth single should be. After this post, Dunn was called by Sony when they informed him that his Facebook post "killed" the "Let The Cowboy Rock" single. Dunn then suggested that the fourth single from the album be "Once". The single was never released. On June 7, 2012, one year after the release of the album, Dunn announced on Facebook that he and Sony had parted ways.

On June 4, 2013, Dunn released a promo single "Country This" and the lead off single "Kiss You There" to SiriusXM radio. On June 6, 2013, Dunn performed the two songs along with "Cowgirls Rock 'N Roll" and the title track from the album "Peace, Love, And Country Music" at the 2013 CMA Music Fest following the 2013 CMT Music Awards.

On June 9, 2013, Dunn announced his new record deal with indie label HitShop Records. The deal was to be a joint effort between HitShop and Dunn's own Little Will-E Records with HitShop assisting in radio distribution. However, after an unsuccessful run with "Kiss You There", LWR and HitShop parted ways.

On November 19, 2013, the second single "I Wish I Still Smoked Cigarettes" was released. To promote the single, Dunn embarked on a small radio tour. He also performed on TV talk show such as Dr. Phil, The Doctors, and The Talk.

On January 22, 2014, another promo single "Grown Damn Man" was released through iTunes. Following the release of "Grown Damn Man" Dunn and Jeff Balding announced that the new album Peace Love and Country Music would be released on April 8, 2014, in digital through iTunes and Amazon with a physical CD being released in partnership with country western store Country Outfitter.

== Track listing ==
No.	Title	Writer(s)	Length
1.	"Grown Damn Man"	Ronnie Dunn, Nikki Shannon Fernandez	3:56
2.	"Cadillac Bound"	Travis Meadows, Josh Thompson	3:18
3.	"Cowgirls Rock 'N Roll"	Dunn, Rodney Clawson, Chris Tompkins	3:24
4.	"Heart Letting Go"	Al Anderson, Chris Stapleton	3:45
5.	"You Should See You Now"	Lee Brice, Rob Hatch	3:39
6.	"Country This"	Tim Nichols, Craig Wiseman	3:11
7.	"I Wish I Still Smoked Cigarettes"	Luke Laird, Lori McKenna, Barry Dean	4:05
8.	"Let's Get The Beer Joint Rockin'"	Dunn	4:16
9.	"You Don't Know Me"	Cindy Walker, Eddy Arnold	4:17
10.	"Romeo & Juliet"	Dunn	3:12
11.	"Kiss You There"	Don Schlitz, Josh Kear	3:49
12.	"Thou Shalt Not"	Ray Wylie Hubbard, Dunn	4:30
13.	"They Still Play Country Music In Texas"	Dunn	4:04
14.	"Peace, Love, and Country Music"	Tim James, Jameson Clark, Stapleton	3:29
