= Tyler Booth =

American country music singer-songwriter

- Born: December 15, 1996 (age 29); Campton, Kentucky, U.S.
- Genres: Country
- Occupations: Singer, songwriter
- Instruments: Vocals, guitar
- Years active: 2015–present
- Label: Sony Music Nashville
- Website: www.tylerboothmusic.com

Tyler Booth (born December 15, 1996) is an American country music singer-songwriter, signed to a joint venture between Villa40 and Sony Music Nashville.

== Background ==
Born December 15, 1996, Booth was raised in Campton, Kentucky Wolfe County, Kentucky, which is in the Eastern part of the state. He grew up listening to Black Label Society, Five Finger Death Punch, Waylon Jennings Tiny Tim, Jessco White, and his father Jason's rock band Stitch Rivet, a regional rock band fronted by Booth's uncle Gene, twin brother of father Jason, who also managed the band. He attended Morehead State University and took courses in the traditional music program before leaving after his first year. Scott Miller an adjunct instructor in the traditional music program, became an early advocate for Booth's talents. Tyler signed a major record deal with Sony Music Nashville in early 2020.

== Career ==
Booth (left) performing with Darius Rucker in 2021

By 2017, Booth's songwriting and singing was gaining attention, including from songwriter and producer Phil O'Donnell who invited Booth down to Nashville, where he had Booth sing on a number of songs he had written, while also composing additional material. Later that year, Booth self-titled six-song EP that featured the fan favorite Hank Crankin’ People.

Booth was featured on Brooks & Dunn's Reboot album from 2019, joining them on their hit "Lost and Found", and his touring commitments have intensified, including runs with Dwight Yoakam and Brantley Gilbert on his 'Kick It In The Ship Cruise':

Later in 2019, Booth released the singles "Long Comes a Girl" and "Where the Livin' Is" through Villa40/Sony Music Nashville.

== Discography ==
=== Singles ===
- "Long Comes a Girl" (Sony Nashville, 2019)
- "Where the Livin' Is" (Sony Nashville, 2019)

=== EPs ===
- Self-Titled (Independent, 2017)
- Grab the Reins (Sony Music Entertainment, 2021)
