= Reboot (Brooks & Dunn album) =

Studio album by Brooks & Dunn
- Released: April 5, 2019
- Studio: Starstruck Studios
- Genre: Country
- Length: 47:22
- Label: Arista Nashville
- Producers: Dann Huff (all tracks), Kacey Musgraves (track 4)

Brooks & Dunn chronology
#1s... and Then Some (2009)	Reboot (2019)	Reboot II (2024)

Reboot is the twelfth studio album by American country music duo Brooks & Dunn, released on April 5, 2019, through Arista Nashville. The album features re-recorded versions of 12 of the duo's songs, done as collaborations with other country music artists. Reboot was produced by Dann Huff. It debuted at number eight on the US Billboard 200.

== Content ==
The album includes twelve renditions of Brooks & Dunn's previous singles, each done with featured vocals from another country music artist. Regarding the creation of the album, duo member Kix Brooks said that "we didn't do any production meetings about how we might cut these things", while Ronnie Dunn said that "Each artist came at it from a different angle", noting that Jon Pardi in particular did not want to make any musical alterations on "My Next Broken Heart". The duo announced the track listing on February 21, after having released three of the album's tracks on social media: "My Next Broken Heart", along with "Brand New Man" with Luke Combs and "Believe" with Kane Brown. Dann Huff produced the entire album, with co-production from Kacey Musgraves on her rendition of "Neon Moon". The album is Brooks & Dunn's first studio release since 2007's Cowboy Town.

== Critical reception ==
Stephen Thomas Erlewine rated the album 3 out of 5 stars. His review praised the performances of Luke Combs, Brothers Osborne, Jon Pardi, and Midland as staying true to Brooks & Dunn's sounds, but criticized the performances of Brett Young, Kane Brown, and Thomas Rhett. He said of the latter that "These cuts aren't stumbles as much as confirmation that Brooks & Dunn may be a tad too old to learn new tricks, but the rest of Reboot proves that they're still adept at sounding big and burly nearly 30 years after their debut." Jeffrey B. Remz of Country Standard Time gave a largely positive review toward the vocal performances of both Brooks & Dunn and the featured artists, but criticized Huff's production style, stating that "Modern beats aside at times, Brooks & Dunn give a generally welcome re-introduction of their songs with help from musicians who seem to have the right interpretation." Dan McIntosh of Roughstock was largely positive toward the vocals of Brooks & Dunn, praising many of the vocal performances. His review compared Brothers Osborne's rendition of "Hard Workin' Man" to ZZ Top, while also comparing Pardi's version of "My Next Broken Heart" to Pardi's own work. He criticized the vocal performance and arrangement of "Ain't Nothing 'bout You", but thought that Cody Johnson's performance on "Red Dirt Road" was the strongest.

== Commercial performance ==
Reboot debuted at No. 1 on Billboard's Top Country Albums for the chart week of April 20, 2019. This is their first No. 1 on this chart in nearly 10 years since their greatest hits compilation Number 1s... and Then Some in 2009. It sold 21,000 in traditional album, 31,000 in equivalent album units. The album has sold 70,200 copies in the United States as of February 2020.

== Track listing ==
No.	Title	Writer(s)	Featured artist	Length
1.	"Brand New Man"	Kix Brooks; Ronnie Dunn; Don Cook	Luke Combs	3:11
2.	"Ain't Nothing 'bout You"	Rivers Rutherford; Tom Shapiro	Brett Young	4:01
3.	"My Next Broken Heart"	Brooks; Dunn; Cook	Jon Pardi	3:06
4.	"Neon Moon"	Dunn	Kacey Musgraves	4:38
5.	"Lost and Found"	Brooks; Cook	Tyler Booth	3:55
6.	"Hard Workin' Man"	Dunn	Brothers Osborne	3:59
7.	"You're Gonna Miss Me When I'm Gone"	Brooks; Dunn; Cook	Ashley McBryde	4:19
8.	"My Maria"	B. W. Stevenson; Daniel Moore	Thomas Rhett	3:30
9.	"Red Dirt Road"	Brooks; Dunn	Cody Johnson	3:56
10.	"Boot Scootin' Boogie"	Dunn	Midland	3:23
11.	"Mama Don't Get Dressed Up for Nothing"	Brooks; Dunn; Cook	LANCO	4:12
12.	"Believe"	Dunn; Craig Wiseman	Kane Brown	5:11

== Personnel ==
Adapted from AllMusic

=== Brooks & Dunn ===
- Kix Brooks - lead vocals, background vocals, harmonica
- Ronnie Dunn - lead vocals, background vocals

=== Additional Musicians ===
- Robert Bailey - background vocals
- Tyler Booth - vocals on "Lost and Found"
- Kane Brown - vocals on "Believe"
- Jess Carson - acoustic guitar and vocals on "Boot Scootin' Boogie"
- Ben Caver - background vocals
- Dave Cohen - Hammond B-3 organ
- Luke Combs - vocals on "Brand New Man"
- Robbie Crowell - piano
- Cameron Duddy - bass guitar and vocals on "Boot Scootin' Boogie"
- Dan Dugmore - steel guitar
- Stuart Duncan - fiddle
- Jason Eskridge - background vocals
- Paul Franklin - steel guitar, programming
- Jim Hoke - alto saxophone
- Dann Huff - electric slide guitar, 12-string acoustic guitar, acoustic guitar, electric guitar, resonator guitar, piano, programming, synthesizer, tambourine
- David Huff - programming
- Cody Johnson - vocals on "Red Dirt Road"
- Charlie Judge - accordion, Hammond B-3 organ, keyboards, piano, synthesizer
- Adam Keafer - bass guitar
- LANCO - vocals on "Mama Don't Get Dressed Up for Nothing"
- Ashley McBryde - vocals on "You're Gonna Miss Me When I'm Gone"
- Gordon Mote - Hammond B-3 organ, piano
- Kacey Musgraves - vocals on "Neon Moon"
- John Osborne - electric guitar on "Hard Workin' Man"
- T.J. Osborne - vocals on "Hard Workin' Man"
- Jon Pardi - vocals on "My Next Broken Heart"
- Scott M. Quintana - drums, percussion
- Brett Resnick - steel guitar
- Thomas Rhett - vocals on "My Maria"
- Kyle Ryan - electric guitar
- Jimmie Lee Sloas - bass guitar
- Nat Smith - Juno, Mellotron, Prophet synthesizer
- Aaron Sterling - drums, percussion
- Russell Terrell - background vocals
- Ilya Toshinsky - bouzouki, dobro, acoustic guitar, resonator guitar, hi-string acoustic guitar, mandola, mandolin, ukulele
- Kai Welch - Moog synthesizer, piano, vocoder
- Derek Wells - acoustic guitar, electric guitar
- Mark Wystrach - vocals on "Boot Scootin' Boogie"
- Brett Young - vocals on "Ain't Nothing 'bout You"

== Charts ==
=== Weekly charts ===
Chart (2019)	Peak position
Australian Albums (ARIA)	15
Canadian Albums (Billboard)	16
US Billboard 200	8
US Top Country Albums (Billboard)	1

=== Year-end charts ===
Chart (2019)	Position
US Top Country Albums (Billboard)	48

== Certifications ==
Region	Certification	Certified units/sales
Canada (Music Canada)	Gold	40,000^{‡}
United States (RIAA)	Gold	500,000^{‡}
^{‡} Sales+streaming figures based on certification alone.
