= Boot Scootin' Boogie =

1992 single by Brooks & Dunn

Single by Brooks & Dunn

from the album Brand New Man
- B-side: "I've Got a Lot to Learn"
- Released: May 25, 1992
- Recorded: 1991
- Genre: Country; country rock
- Length: 3:18 (album version); 6:30 (club mix)
- Label: Arista Nashville 12440
- Songwriter: Ronnie Dunn
- Producers: Don Cook; Scott Hendricks

Brooks & Dunn singles chronology
"Neon Moon" (1992)	"Boot Scootin' Boogie" (1992)	"Lost and Found" (1992)

"Boot Scootin' Boogie" is a song first recorded by the band Asleep at the Wheel for their 1990 album, Keepin' Me Up Nights. American country music duo Brooks & Dunn recorded a cover version, which was included as the eighth track on their 1991 debut album, Brand New Man. It originally served as the B-side to their second single, "My Next Broken Heart". It became the duo's fourth single release and fourth consecutive number-one single on the U.S. Billboard Hot Country Singles chart. A dance remix of the song features as the eleventh and final track on their 1993 album Hard Workin' Man.

In 2019, Brooks & Dunn re-recorded "Boot Scootin' Boogie" with American country music group Midland for their album Reboot.

In 2024, they re-recorded the song for a second time. This version features the rock band Halestorm, and was released on their album Reboot II.

== Content ==
The song is a tribute to the line dancing in a Texas-style honky-tonk. Most fans consider it to be Brooks and Dunn's signature song.

== Dance culture ==
The song's success is credited with having sparked a renewed interest in line dancing throughout the United States. The song was Brooks & Dunn's first crossover hit, reaching number 50 on the U.S. Billboard Hot 100.

== Cover versions ==
Country music singer George Strait covered the song from The Last Rodeo Tour.

== Music video ==
The music video was directed by Michael Merriman. The video was filmed at the Tulsa City Limits nightclub in Tulsa, Oklahoma.

== Chart positions ==
"Boot Scootin' Boogie" debuted at number 73 on the U.S. Billboard Hot Country Singles chart for the week of May 23, 1992.

Chart (1992)	Peak position
Canada Country Singles (RPM)	1
US Billboard Hot 100	50
US Hot Country Songs (Billboard)	1

=== Year-end charts ===
Chart (1992)	Position
Canada Country Tracks (RPM)	17
US Country Songs (Billboard)	7

== Certifications ==
Region	Certification	Certified units/sales
Canada (Music Canada)	4× Platinum	320,000^{‡}
United States (RIAA)	5× Platinum	5,000,000^{‡}
^{‡} Sales+streaming figures based on certification alone.
