= We'll Burn That Bridge =

Single by Brooks & Dunn

from the album Hard Workin' Man
- B-side: "Heartbroke Out of My Mind"
- Released: May 3, 1993
- Genre: Country
- Length: 2:57
- Label: Arista 12563
- Songwriters: Don Cook; Ronnie Dunn
- Producers: Don Cook; Scott Hendricks

Brooks & Dunn singles chronology
| "Hard Workin' Man" (1993) | "We'll Burn That Bridge" (1993) | "She Used to Be Mine" (1993) |

"We'll Burn That Bridge" is a song written by Don Cook and Ronnie Dunn and recorded by American country music duo Brooks & Dunn. Released in May 1993 as the second single from their album, Hard Workin' Man, it peaked at #2 on the country charts for two weeks, behind "Chattahoochee" by Alan Jackson.

== Content ==
The song's narrator meets a woman whose man had walked out on her. The narrator promises her that he'll take her so much higher from where the man left her down at, and tells her that if her former lover's memory comes around, that they'll burn that bridge when they get there.

== Chart positions ==
"We'll Burn That Bridge" debuted at number 70 on the U.S. Billboard Hot Country Singles & Tracks for the week of May 15, 1993.

| Chart (1993) | Peak position |
|---|---|
| Canada Country Singles (RPM) | 1 |
| US Hot Country Songs (Billboard) | 2 |

=== Year-end charts ===
| Chart (1993) | Position |
|---|---|
| Canada Country Tracks (RPM) | 30 |
| US Country Songs (Billboard) | 22 |
