= Neon Moon =

Single by Brooks & Dunn

from the album Brand New Man
- B-side: "Cheating on the Blues"
- Released: February 24, 1992
- Recorded: 1991
- Genre: Country
- Length: 4:20
- Label: Arista 12388
- Songwriter: Ronnie Dunn
- Producers: Don Cook; Scott Hendricks

Brooks & Dunn singles chronology
"My Next Broken Heart" (1991)	"Neon Moon" (1992)	"Boot Scootin' Boogie" (1992)

"Neon Moon" is a song written by Ronnie Dunn and recorded by American country music duo Brooks & Dunn. It was released in February 1992 as the third single from their debut album, Brand New Man. The song became their third consecutive number-one single on the country charts. It was also their first single not to have an accompanying music video. In 2024, Brooks and Dunn made a remix of the song with Morgan Wallen for their album, Reboot II. This version peaked at number 24 on the Hot Country Songs chart.

== Content ==
The song talks of an unnamed man at a bar feeling brokenhearted because his significant other has left, so he "spend[s] most every night beneath the light of a neon moon".

== Critical reception ==
In 2024, Rolling Stone ranked the song at number 41 on its 200 Greatest Country Songs of All Time ranking.

== Cover versions ==
Country music singer Carrie Underwood covered the song from the Last Rodeo Tour.

On December 18, 2018, American dream pop band Cigarettes After Sex released a cover version to streaming platforms.

A newly recorded version by Brooks and Dunn featuring American country singer Kacey Musgraves appeared on the duo's 2019 duet album, Reboot, released on April 5, 2019. Musgraves also performed the song on several dates of her 2018–2019 Oh, What a World: Tour.

Kelly Clarkson covered the song with Gwen Stefani, John Legend, and Blake Shelton in the first season of The Kelly Clarkson Show as a Kellyoke, which aired on November 21, 2019.

Dave Audé covered the song with Cody Belew, released on June 17, 2022.

== Chart positions ==
=== Weekly charts ===
Chart (1992)	Peak position
Canada Country Singles (RPM)	1
US Hot Country Songs (Billboard)	1
Chart (2024)	Peak position
US Billboard Hot 100	97
US Hot Country Songs (Billboard)	24

=== Year-end charts ===
Chart (1992)	Position
Canada Country Tracks (RPM)	25
US Country Songs (Billboard)	9

== Certifications ==
Region	Certification	Certified units/sales
New Zealand (RMNZ)	2× Platinum	60,000^{‡}
United States (RIAA)	8× Platinum	8,000,000^{‡}
with Kacey Musgraves
Canada (Music Canada)	3× Platinum	240,000^{‡}
United States (RIAA)	Platinum	1,000,000^{‡}
^{‡} Sales+streaming figures based on certification alone.
