= Let the Cowboy Rock =

Single by Ronnie Dunn

from the album Ronnie Dunn
- Released: January 16, 2012
- Genre: Country rock
- Length: 2:55
- Label: Arista Nashville
- Songwriters: Ronnie Dunn; Dallas Davidson
- Producer: Ronnie Dunn

Ronnie Dunn singles chronology
"Cost of Livin'" (2011)	"Let the Cowboy Rock" (2012)	"Kiss You There" (2013)

"Let the Cowboy Rock" is a song co-written and recorded by American country music artist Ronnie Dunn. It was released in January 2012 as the third single from his self-titled album. Dunn wrote this song with Dallas Davidson.

== History ==
While the song was charting, Dunn began soliciting fan suggestions for a fourth single on his Facebook page. He later posted on May 15 that Sony executives had called him and told him that the solicitations "killed the Let The Cowboy Rock single". A month later, he posted that he had exited Arista Nashville.

In September 2012, Dunn remixed the single with Jeff Balding and Terry McBride for use by Professional Bull Riders.

== Critical reception ==
Giving it 3 stars out of 5, Billy Dukes of Taste of Country said that the song was "reminiscent" of Brooks & Dunn's "Play Something Country" and "You Can't Take the Honky Tonk Out of the Girl", but thought that it would have been better suited for a younger singer. Bobby Peacock of Roughstock gave it 4 stars out of 5, saying that "At 58, Ronnie has lost none of his passion and spark".

== Music video ==
The music video features Dunn performing at the Stage bar in Nashville, Tennessee.

== Chart performance ==
Chart (2012)	Peak position
US Hot Country Songs (Billboard)	31
