= Cost of Livin' =

Single by Ronnie Dunn

from the album Ronnie Dunn
- Released: June 27, 2011
- Genre: Country
- Length: 4:10
- Label: Arista Nashville
- Songwriters: Ronnie Dunn; Phillip Coleman
- Producer: Ronnie Dunn

Ronnie Dunn singles chronology
"Bleed Red" (2011)	"Cost of Livin'" (2011)	"Let the Cowboy Rock" (2012)

"Cost of Livin'" is a song co-written and recorded by American country music singer Ronnie Dunn. It was released in June 2011 as the second single from his self-titled album, and his second release following the split of the duo Brooks & Dunn. Dunn wrote this song with Phillip Coleman.

== Background and writing ==
Dunn had first had the song on hold in 2008, during the economic recession, but decided against recording it because he thought that the economy would improve. Dunn was also told that by label executives that he was "too wealthy" for the song, a comment which Dunn said made him "furious." Phillip Coleman wrote most of the song, but Dunn changed the original chorus and hook.

== Content ==
In "Cost of Livin'", Dunn sings as a man presenting his skills and positive qualities as an employment candidate to an interviewer. The man makes reference to his military background and how he faithfully worked for his former employer before an economic downturn forced it to cease business operations. The tone of the lyrics indicate that he and his family are struggling financially, and that new employment will help their situation. The end of the song is somewhat vague as to whether the man is successful in gaining a new job or just interviewing for another position, though it is clear that the urgency of his situation is mounting.

== Critical reception ==
Giving it four-and-a-half stars out of five, Billy Dukes of Taste of Country said that it "tells a chillingly familiar story that one can’t help but stop and notice." He praised the "bare-bones production" and Dunn's "big voice". Kevin John Coyne of Country Universe gave the song an A grade, calling it "a masterpiece that is as timely as it is well written and performed." Dunn's performance of the song earned him two Grammy Award nominations, one for Best Country Song for co-writing "Cost of Livin'" and one for Best Country Solo Performance.

== Music video ==
The music video was directed by Thien Phan.

The parts with Dunn in it was shot at a closed-down gas station in Lowery, Oklahoma. Otherwise, it tells the story of the Goodyear tire manufacturer in Union City, Tennessee which was ceasing operations, and features interviews with several former workers of the plant that talk about how hard it will be now that they are unemployed.

== Chart performance ==
Chart (2011)	Peak position
US Hot Country Songs (Billboard)	19
US Billboard Hot 100	86

=== Year-end charts ===
Chart (2011)	Position
US Country Songs (Billboard)	65
