= Damn Drunk =

Single by Ronnie Dunn with Kix Brooks

from the album Tattooed Heart
- Released: August 5, 2016
- Genre: Country
- Length: 4:24
- Label: Nash Icon
- Songwriters: Liz Hengber; Alex Kline; Ben Stennis
- Producer: Jay DeMarcus

Ronnie Dunn singles chronology
"Ain't No Trucks in Texas" (2015)	"Damn Drunk" (2016)	"I Worship the Woman You Walked On" (2017)

Kix Brooks singles chronology
"There's the Sun" (2013)	"Damn Drunk" (2016)

Music video
- "Damn Drunk" on YouTube

"Damn Drunk" is a song written by Liz Hengber, Alex Kline and Ben Stennis and recorded by American country music artist Ronnie Dunn as a duet with Kix Brooks, one half of Brooks & Dunn. It was released in August 2016 as the second single from Dunn's third studio album Tattooed Heart.

Although the song is credited as Ronnie Dunn with Kix Brooks, this became the first new Brooks & Dunn song since the 2009 single "Honky Tonk Stomp".

== Chart performance ==
Chart (2016)	Peak position
US Hot Country Songs (Billboard)	42
US Country Airplay (Billboard)	36
