= That Ain't No Way to Go =

"That Ain't No Way To Go"

Single by Brooks & Dunn

from the album Hard Workin' Man
- B-side: "I Can't Put Out This Fire"
- Released: March 28, 1994
- Recorded: 1992–1993
- Genre: Country
- Length: 3:37
- Label: Arista 12669
- Songwriters: Kix Brooks; Don Cook; Ronnie Dunn
- Producers: Don Cook; Scott Hendricks

Brooks & Dunn singles chronology
"Rock My World (Little Country Girl)" (1993)	"That Ain't No Way To Go" (1994)	"She's Not the Cheatin' Kind" (1994)

"That Ain't No Way To Go" is a song co-written and recorded by American country music duo Brooks & Dunn. It was released in March 1994 the fifth and final single from their album Hard Workin' Man. The song reached number one on the Billboard Hot Country Singles & Tracks (now Hot Country Songs) chart. The duo co-wrote it with Don Cook.

== Music video ==
The music video was directed by Piers Plowden and premiered in April 1994 and was aired on CMT and GAC.

== Cover versions ==
Country music singer Tim McGraw covered the song from The Last Rodeo Tour

== Chart performance ==
The song debuted at number 55 on the Hot Country Singles & Tracks chart dated April 9, 1994. It charted for 20 weeks on that chart, and reached Number One on the chart dated June 11, 1994, holding the top spot for one week, and becoming the duo's sixth Number One single.

=== Charts ===
Chart (1994)	Peak position
Canada Country Singles (RPM)	3
US Hot Country Songs (Billboard)	1

=== Year-end charts ===
Chart (1994)	Position
Canada Country Tracks (RPM)	59
US Country Songs (Billboard)	11

== Certifications ==
Region	Certification	Certified units/sales
United States (RIAA)	Gold	500,000^{‡}
^{‡} Sales+streaming figures based on certification alone.
