= Bleed Red =

Single by Ronnie Dunn

from the album Ronnie Dunn
- Released: January 31, 2011
- Genre: Country
- Length: 3:49
- Label: Arista Nashville
- Songwriters: Tommy Lee James; Andrew Dorff
- Producer: Ronnie Dunn

Ronnie Dunn singles chronology
"Jessie" (1984)	"Bleed Red" (2011)	"Cost of Livin'" (2011)

"Bleed Red" is a song written by Tommy Lee James and Andrew Dorff, and recorded by American country music singer Ronnie Dunn. The song is Dunn's first solo release after Brooks & Dunn disbanded in 2010. "Bleed Red" was released to country radio on January 31, 2011. It is intended to be the lead-off single from Dunn's self-titled debut solo album. He had previously released three singles: "It's Written All Over Your Face", "She Put the Sad in All His Songs", and "Jessie"; with the first two singles charting to number 59 on the U.S. Billboard Hot Country Singles & Tracks (now Hot Country Songs) chart.

== Reception ==
=== Critical ===
Matt Bjorke of Roughstock reviewed the song and gave it a "4-star" rating. Bjorke stated he thought the song was a "power ballad with a message on inclusiveness and forgiveness." He also continued saying the production could have been toned down a notch.

=== Commercial ===
"Bleed Red" was released to country radio on January 31, 2011. It then debuted at number 30 on the U.S. Billboard Hot Country Songs chart for the chart week ending February 19, 2011. Its debut position matches the highest debut ever made by a Brooks & Dunn single, as "My Maria" also debuted at number 30 in 1996. In its second chart week, it debuted at number 99 on the U.S. Billboard Hot 100. It also debuted at number 99 on the Canadian Hot 100 chart for the week of March 5, 2011. It peaked at number 10 on the country chart in May 2011.

== Music video ==
The music video was directed by Thien Phan and premiered in April 2011.

== Chart performance ==
Chart (2011)	Peak position
US Hot Country Songs (Billboard)	10
US Billboard Hot 100	62
Canada Hot 100 (Billboard)	67

=== Year-end charts ===
Chart (2011)	Position
US Country Songs (Billboard)	44
