= Hard Workin' Man (song) =

Single by Brooks & Dunn

from the album Hard Workin' Man
- B-side: "Texas Women (Don't Stay Lonely Long)"
- Released: February 1, 1993
- Recorded: 1992–1993
- Genre: Country
- Length: 2:58
- Label: Arista 12513
- Songwriter: Ronnie Dunn
- Producers: Don Cook; Scott Hendricks

Brooks & Dunn singles chronology
"Lost and Found" (1992)	"Hard Workin' Man" (1993)	"We'll Burn That Bridge" (1993)

"Hard Workin' Man" is a song written by Ronnie Dunn, and recorded by American country music duo Brooks & Dunn. It peaked at number four on the US Country charts in 1993 and was released in February 1993 as the first single and title track from their second album Hard Workin' Man. It also won the duo a Grammy for the Best Country Performance by a Duo or Group with Vocals in 1994.

In 2019, Brooks & Dunn re-recorded "Hard Workin' Man" with American country music duo Brothers Osborne for their album Reboot.

== Cover versions ==
Country music singer Darius Rucker covered the song from The Last Rodeo Tour.

== Music video ==
The music video was directed by Sherman Halsey. It features the duo playing the song at Red Rock Canyon, and in front of a crowd while in two Cadillac convertibles on Fremont Street in Las Vegas. Footage of professional rodeo cowboys in competition are also seen, ending with a shot of a female horseback rider holding an American flag.

== Chart positions ==
"Hard Workin' Man" debuted at number 57 on the Hot Country Singles & Tracks chart for the week of February 6, 1993.

Chart (1993)	Peak position
Canada Country Singles (RPM)	1
US Hot Country Songs (Billboard)	4

=== Year-end charts ===
Chart (1993)	Position
Canada Country Tracks (RPM)	6
US Country Songs (Billboard)	30

== Certifications ==
Region	Certification	Certified units/sales
United States (RIAA)	Platinum	1,000,000^{‡}
^{‡} Sales+streaming figures based on certification alone.
