= Hillbilly Deluxe (Brooks & Dunn album) =

Studio album by Brooks & Dunn
- Released: August 30, 2005
- Genre: Neotraditional country
- Length: 48:34
- Label: Arista Nashville
- Producers: Kix Brooks, Tony Brown, Bob DiPiero, Ronnie Dunn, Tom Shapiro, Mark Wright

Brooks & Dunn chronology
The Greatest Hits Collection II (2004)	Hillbilly Deluxe (2005)	Cowboy Town (2007)

Singles from Hillbilly Deluxe
- 1. "Play Something Country" Released: May 23, 2005; 2. "Believe" Released: September 26, 2005; 3. "Building Bridges" Released: June 5, 2006; 4. "Hillbilly Deluxe" Released: November 6, 2006

Professional ratings
Review scores
Source	Rating
AllMusic	4/5 stars

Hillbilly Deluxe is the tenth studio album by American country music duo Brooks & Dunn, released in 2005 on Arista Nashville. Certified Platinum in the United States by the RIAA, the album produced four singles on the Billboard Hot Country Songs charts. The duo produced the majority of the album with Tony Brown.

== Content ==
Hillbilly Deluxe was led off by the single "Play Something Country." This song was co-written by Ronnie Dunn, one-half of Brooks & Dunn, along with former McBride & the Ride frontman Terry McBride, who plays bass in Brooks & Dunn's road band and co-writes several of their songs. "Play Something Country" was the duo's twentieth and final Number One hit on the Billboard country singles charts. "Believe" and "Building Bridges" (featuring guest vocals from Vince Gill and Sheryl Crow), were released as the album's second and third singles, respectively, and both were additional Top Ten hits. The title track was the final single released from the album, and it reached a peak of number 16.

== Production ==
Kix Brooks and Ronnie Dunn produced the majority of the album with Tony Brown, except for "My Heart's Not a Hotel", which Brooks, Brown and Dunn produced with Mark Wright. Brooks and Tom Shapiro co-produced the demo for "One More Roll of the Dice" (which they also co-wrote), while the demos for "Her West Was Wilder" and "She Likes to Get Out of Town" were produced by Brooks and Bob DiPiero, who also co-wrote those tracks with Brooks.

== Track listing ==
No.	Title	Writer(s)	Length
1.	"Play Something Country"	Ronnie Dunn, Terry McBride	3:14
2.	"She’s About As Lonely As I’m Going to Let Her Get"	Dunn, McBride	2:49
3.	"My Heart’s Not a Hotel"	Rob Crosby, Allen Shamblin	3:40
4.	"Whiskey Do My Talkin’"	Dunn, McBride	3:34
5.	"Hillbilly Deluxe"	Brad Crisler, Craig Wiseman	4:18
6.	"One More Roll of the Dice"	Kix Brooks, Tom Shapiro	4:05
7.	"Just Another Neon Night"	Dunn, McBride	3:16
8.	"Believe"	Dunn, Wiseman	5:38
9.	"Building Bridges" (ft. Sheryl Crow and Vince Gill)	Hank DeVito, Larry Willoughby	4:23
10.	"Her West Was Wilder"	Brooks, Bob DiPiero	3:33
11.	"I May Never Get Over You"	Dunn, McBride	2:56
12.	"She Likes to Get Out of Town"	Brooks, DiPero	3:44
13.	"Again"	Darrell Brown, Radney Foster	3:15

Best Buy Deluxe Version
No.	Title	Length
14.	"It Ain’t Me If It Ain’t You"	3:44
15.	"Sweet Mystery"	4:06
16.	"Down By the River"	3:45

== Personnel ==
Compiled from liner notes.

Musicians

- Eddie Bayers – drums
- Larry Beaird – acoustic guitar
- Mike Brignardello – bass guitar
- Kix Brooks – lead vocals, background vocals, harmonica
- Steve Bryant – bass guitar
- Tom Bukovac – acoustic guitar
- Lisa Cochran – background vocals
- Perry Coleman – background vocals
- J. T. Corenflos – acoustic guitar, electric guitar
- Sheryl Crow – background vocals on "Building Bridges"
- Eric Darken – percussion
- Chip Davis – background vocals
- Bob DiPiero – acoustic guitar
- Dan Dugmore – acoustic guitar, steel guitar
- Stuart Duncan – mandolin
- Ronnie Dunn – lead vocals, background vocals
- Shannon Forrest – drums
- Larry Franklin – mandolin
- Vince Gill – background vocals on "Building Bridges"
- Kenny Greenberg – electric guitar, National guitar
- David Grissom – electric guitar
- Tony Harrell – piano, keyboards
- Steve Herrmann – trumpet
- Wes Hightower – background vocals
- John Hobbs – piano
- Jim Horn – baritone saxophone
- Kim Keyes – background vocals
- Troy Lancaster – electric guitar
- Brent Mason – electric guitar
- Terry McBride – acoustic guitar, background vocals
- Greg Morrow – drums, percussion
- Gordon Mote – Hammond B-3 organ
- Duncan Mullins – bass guitar
- Russ Pahl – steel guitar
- Kim Parent – background vocals
- Bill Payne – piano
- Michael Rhodes – bass guitar
- Charles Rose – trombone
- John Wesley Ryles – background vocals
- Scotty Sanders – steel guitar
- Hank Singer – fiddle
- Bryan Sutton – acoustic guitar, banjo, mandolin
- Harvey Thompson – tenor saxophone
- Scott Williamson – drums
- Glenn Worf – bass guitar
- Reese Wynans – piano, keyboards, Hammond B-3 organ

Choir on "Believe" and "Again"

- Jovan E. Bender
- Ashley Cromartie
- Delva Dwana
- DaJuana R. Elder
- Danyelle Haley
- Moiro Konchella
- Erika Rowell
- Meshia Sandifer
- Chris Smith
- Andre Trice
- Raymond Williams

Production

- Brooks & Dunn – producer (all tracks)
- Tony Brown – producer
- Mark Wright – producer ("My Heart's Not a Hotel")
- Doug Sax – mastering engineer

== Chart performance ==
=== Weekly charts ===
Chart (2005)	Peak position
Australian Albums (ARIA Charts)	79
US Billboard 200	3
US Top Country Albums (Billboard)	1

=== Year-end charts ===
Chart (2005)	Position
US Top Country Albums (Billboard)	36
Chart (2006)	Position
US Billboard 200	70
US Top Country Albums (Billboard)	19

== Certifications ==
Region	Certification	Certified units/sales
Canada (Music Canada)	Gold	50,000^{^}
United States (RIAA)	Platinum	1,000,000^{^}
^{^} Shipments figures based on certification alone.
