= Brand New Man =

Studio album by Brooks & Dunn
- Released: August 13, 1991
- Recorded: 1990–1991
- Studio: Tree Studio, Midtown Tone & Volume and SoundShop Recording Studios (Nashville, Tennessee)
- Genre: Honky-tonk; neotraditional country
- Length: 32:51
- Label: Arista
- Producer: Don Cook; Scott Hendricks

Brooks & Dunn chronology
Brand New Man (1991)	Hard Workin' Man (1993)

Singles from Brand New Man
- 1. "Brand New Man" Released: June 10, 1991; 2. "My Next Broken Heart" Released: September 30, 1991; 3. "Neon Moon" Released: February 24, 1992; 4. "Boot Scootin' Boogie" Released: May 25, 1992; 5. "Lost and Found" Released: September 14, 1992

Professional ratings
Review scores
Source	Rating
AllMusic	4.5/5 stars
Entertainment Weekly	C

Brand New Man is the debut studio album by American country music duo Brooks & Dunn. It was released on August 13, 1991, by Arista Records. Produced by Don Cook and Scott Hendricks, the album spawned four consecutive Number One singles on the U.S. Billboard Hot Country Singles & Tracks (now Hot Country Songs) charts in "Brand New Man", "Boot Scootin' Boogie", "My Next Broken Heart", and "Neon Moon". Additionally, "Lost and Found" peaked at No. 6. The album was certified 7× Multi-Platinum by the RIAA for sales of seven million copies.

== Musical style and composition ==
Brand New Man has been described as a honky-tonk, neotraditional country record.

== Track listing ==
No.	Title	Writer(s)	Length
1.	"Brand New Man"	Kix Brooks; Don Cook; Ronnie Dunn	2:58
2.	"My Next Broken Heart"	Brooks; Dunn; Cook	2:55
3.	"Cool Drink of Water"	Brooks; Cook	3:05
4.	"Cheating on the Blues"	Brooks; Cook; Chick Rains	2:51
5.	"Neon Moon"	Dunn	4:20
6.	"Lost and Found"	Brooks; Cook	3:47
7.	"I've Got a Lot to Learn"	Brooks; Dunn; Cook	2:54
8.	"Boot Scootin' Boogie"	Dunn	3:17
9.	"I'm No Good"	Brooks; Cook	3:08
10.	"Still in Love with You"	Brooks; Dunn; Cook	3:35

== Charts ==
=== Weekly charts ===
Chart (1991–1992)	Peak position
Canadian Country Albums (RPM)	5
US Billboard 200	10
US Top Country Albums (Billboard)	3

=== Year-end charts ===
Chart (1992)	Position
US Billboard 200	42
US Top Country Albums (Billboard)	8
Chart (1993)	Position
US Billboard 200	34
US Top Country Albums (Billboard)	7
Chart (1994)	Position
US Top Country Albums (Billboard)	27
Chart (1995)	Position
US Top Country Albums (Billboard)	49
Chart (1996)	Position
US Top Country Albums (Billboard)	57

== Certifications ==
Region	Certification	Certified units/sales
Canada (Music Canada)	3× Platinum	300,000^{^}
United States (RIAA)	7× Platinum	7,000,000^{‡}
^{^} Shipments figures based on certification alone.^{‡} Sales+streaming figures based on certification alone.

== Personnel ==
Brooks & Dunn

- Kix Brooks – lead and backing vocals
- Ronnie Dunn – lead and backing vocals

Additional musicians

- Bruce Bouton – pedal steel guitar, lap steel guitar, slide guitar
- Mark Casstevens – acoustic guitar, mandolin
- Mike Chapman – bass guitar
- Rob Hajacos – fiddle
- John Barlow Jarvis – piano, keyboards
- Brent Mason – electric guitar
- John Wesley Ryles – backing vocals
- Harry Stinson – backing vocals
- Dennis Wilson – backing vocals
- Lonnie Wilson – drums
- Glenn Worf – bass guitar
