= My Next Broken Heart =

Single by Brooks & Dunn

from the album Brand New Man
- B-side: "Still in Love with You"
- Released: September 30, 1991
- Recorded: 1990
- Genre: Country
- Length: 2:56
- Label: Arista 12337
- Songwriters: Kix Brooks; Don Cook; Ronnie Dunn
- Producers: Don Cook; Scott Hendricks

Brooks & Dunn singles chronology
"Brand New Man" (1991)	"My Next Broken Heart" (1991)	"Neon Moon" (1992)

"My Next Broken Heart" is a song co-written and recorded by American country music duo Brooks & Dunn. It was released in September 1991 as the second single from their debut album Brand New Man. The song was their second straight Number One single on the country charts. It was written by Kix Brooks, Don Cook and Ronnie Dunn.

== Music video ==
The music video was directed by Michael Merriman and premiered in October 1991. It was filmed in the same Texas town as the video for "Brand New Man" was filmed.

== Cover versions ==
Country music singer Brad Paisley covered the song from The Last Rodeo Tour

== Chart positions ==
"My Next Broken Heart" debuted at number 63 on the U.S. Billboard Hot Country Singles & Tracks for the week of October 12, 1991.

Chart (1991)	Peak position
Canada Country Singles (RPM)	3
US Hot Country Songs (Billboard)	1

=== Year-end charts ===
Chart (1992)	Position
Canada Country Tracks (RPM)	96
US Country Songs (Billboard)	63

== Reboot version ==
In March 2019, Brooks & Dunn released a re-recorded version of "My Next Broken Heart", featuring neotraditional country artist Jon Pardi. The track was the third to be released from Brooks & Dunn's studio album, Reboot. Whereas several of the guest vocalist on Reboot worked with Brooks & Dunn to update the songs they were appearing on, Pardi was "adamant" about not changing a single thing about "My Next Broken Heart" as he was such a big fan of the original version.
