= Rock My World (Little Country Girl) =

Single by Brooks & Dunn

from the album Hard Workin' Man
- B-side: "Our Time is Coming"
- Released: December 6, 1993
- Genre: Country
- Length: 3:42
- Label: Arista
- Songwriters: Bill LaBounty; Steve O'Brien
- Producers: Don Cook; Scott Hendricks

Brooks & Dunn singles chronology
"She Used to Be Mine" (1993)	"Rock My World (Little Country Girl)" (1993)	"That Ain't No Way to Go" (1994)

"Rock My World (Little Country Girl)" is a song written by Bill LaBounty and Steve O'Brien and recorded by American country music duo Brooks & Dunn. It was released in December 1993 as the fourth single from Brooks & Dunn's album Hard Workin' Man. It is also their second single to feature Kix Brooks on lead vocals instead of Ronnie Dunn. The song peaked at number 2 on the US Billboard Hot Country Singles & Tracks (now Hot Country Songs) chart.

== Chart performance ==
The song debuted at No. 59 on the Hot Country Singles & Tracks chart dated December 18, 1993, and charted for 20 weeks on that chart. It peaked at No. 2 on the chart, as well as peaking at No. 97 on the Billboard Hot 100.

=== Charts ===
Chart (1993–1994)	Peak position
Canada Country Singles (RPM)	1
US Billboard Hot 100	97
US Hot Country Songs (Billboard)	2

=== Year-end charts ===
Chart (1994)	Position
Canada Country Tracks (RPM)	38
US Country Songs (Billboard)	17
