= Tattooed Heart =

Studio album by Ronnie Dunn
- Released: November 11, 2016
- Studio: The Grip, The Barn and Benchmark Sound (Nashville, Tennessee); Cyber Barn (Brentwood, Tennessee)
- Genre: Country
- Length: 43:02
- Label: Nash Icon
- Producer: Jay DeMarcus (tracks 1–7 & 10–12); Tommy Lee James (track 8); Ronnie Dunn (track 9)

Ronnie Dunn chronology
Peace, Love, and Country Music (2014)	Tattooed Heart (2016)	Re-Dunn (2020)

Singles from Tattooed Heart
- 1. "Ain't No Trucks in Texas" Released: July 17, 2015; 2. "Damn Drunk" Released: August 5, 2016; 3. "I Worship the Woman You Walked On" Released: 2017; 4. "That's Why They Make Jack Daniels" Released: 2017

Tattooed Heart is the third solo studio album by American country music artist Ronnie Dunn. The album was released on November 11, 2016, via Nash Icon Records. The album was originally scheduled for release on October 21, 2016.

The lead single from the album was "Ain't No Trucks in Texas". It was released to radio on July 17, 2015. The single charted at number 42 on the Billboard Country Airplay chart. The second single from the album, "Damn Drunk" (with Kix Brooks, one half of Brooks & Dunn) was released on August 5, 2016. The third single from the album, "I Worship the Woman You Walked On", was released early 2017.

The album got its title from the Ariana Grande song of the same name. After his daughter played him the song, Dunn decided to record a cover for this album and selected it as the title track.

The album has sold 40,600 copies in the United States as of March 2017.

== Track listing ==
No.	Title	Writer(s)	Length
1.	"Ain't No Trucks in Texas"	Tony Martin; Wendell Mobley; Neil Thrasher	3:22
2.	"Damn Drunk" (duet with Kix Brooks)	Liz Hengber; Alex Kline; Ben Stennis	4:24
3.	"I Worship the Woman You Walked On"	Bob DiPiero; Mitzi Dawn Jenkins; Tony Mullins	3:32
4.	"That's Why They Make Jack Daniels"	Jim Collins; Tom Hambridge; Martin	3:24
5.	"I Put That There"	Deric Ruttan; Jonathan Singleton	3:23
6.	"Young Buck"	Jaren Johnston; Jeremy Stover	3:13
7.	"I Wanna Love Like That Again"	Ronnie Dunn	3:14
8.	"Still Feels Like Mexico" (featuring Reba McEntire)	Tommy Lee James; Jon Randall	3:44
9.	"Tattooed Heart"	Antonio Dixon; Kenneth Edmonds; Sean Forman; Ariana Grande; Matt Squire; Leon Thomas; Khristopher Van Riddick-Tynes	3:22
10.	"This Old Heart"	Jim Beavers; Singleton	4:07
11.	"Only Broken Heart in San Antone"	Steve Bogard; Jeff Stevens	4:17
12.	"She Don't Honky Tonk No More"	Dunn; Nikki Fernandez; Andrew Rollins	3:08
Total length:			43:02

== Personnel ==
Adapted from liner notes.

- Ronnie Dunn – lead vocals
- Dave Cohen – keyboards (1–8, 10–12)
- Jay DeMarcus – keyboards (1, 2, 4, 5, 11), programming (1, 2, 5), string programming and arrangements (3), acoustic piano (12)
- David Huff – programming (1, 2, 10–12)
- Charlie Judge – keyboards (9), programming (9), strings (9), bass (9)
- Mike Kyle – additional keyboards (9), sounds (9)
- Ilya Toshinsky – acoustic guitars (1–8, 10–12), electric guitar (1), mandolin (1)
- Tom Bukovac – electric guitar (1)
- Rob McNelley – electric guitar (1, 3–7, 12)
- Sean Neff – electric guitar (1)
- Adam Shoenfeld – electric guitar (2, 8, 10, 11)
- Derek Wells – electric guitar (3–7, 12)
- Kenny Greenberg – electric guitar (8)
- Justin Ostrander – electric guitar (8)
- Jon Randall – electric guitar (8)
- Stuart Mathis – all guitars (9)
- Dan Dugmore – steel guitar (1, 2, 10, 11)
- Paul Franklin – steel guitar (3–7, 12)
- Gary Morse – steel guitar (9)
- Mark Hill – bass (1)
- Joey Canaday – bass (2, 10, 11)
- Jimmie Lee Sloas – bass (3–7, 12)
- David LaBruyere – bass (8)
- Dorian Crozier – drums (1)
- Evan Hutchings – drums (2–8, 10–12)
- Neil Kyle – drums (9), chimes (9)
- Jeneé Fleenor – fiddle (12)
- Russell Terrell – backing vocals (1)
- Kix Brooks – featured vocals (2)
- Chip Davis – backing vocals (2, 4–6, 10, 11)
- Perry Coleman – backing vocals (3, 12)
- Tabitha Fair – backing vocals (7)
- Vicki Hampton – backing vocals (7, 9)
- Kim Keyes – backing vocals (7)
- Reba McEntire – backing vocals (8)
- Bob Bailey – backing vocals (9)
- Gene Miller – backing vocals (10)

=== Production ===
- Allison Jones – A&R
- Jay DeMarcus – producer (1–7, 10–12)
- Tommy Lee James – producer (8)
- Ronnie Dunn – producer (9)
- Charlie Judge – co-producer (9)
- Sean Neff – recording (1–7, 10–12), digital editing (1–7, 10–12)
- Matt Coles – vocal recording (1–7, 10–12)
- Chris Utley – recording (8), digital editing (8)
- Mike Kyle – recording (9)
- Nick Lane – recording assistant (1–7, 10–12)
- David Huff – digital editing (2, 10, 11)
- Justin Niebank – mixing at Hound's Ear Studio (Franklin, Tennessee)
- Adam Ayan – mastering at Gateway Mastering (Portland, Maine)
- Mike "Frog" Griffith – production coordinator
- Laurel Kittleson – production coordinator
- Janice Soled – production coordinator
- Brianna Steintz – production coordinator
- Becky Reiser – art direction, design
- Sandi Spika Borchetta – art direction, design
- Jim Arndt – photography
- Kim Perrett – wardrobe
- Debbie Dover – hair, make-up

== Charts ==
Chart (2016)	Peak position
US Billboard 200	33
US Top Country Albums (Billboard)	3
