= Believe (Brooks & Dunn song) =

Single by Brooks & Dunn

from the album Hillbilly Deluxe
- Released: October 24, 2005
- Genre: Country; gospel
- Length: 5:39 (album version); 4:34 (radio edit)
- Label: Arista Nashville
- Songwriters: Ronnie Dunn; Craig Wiseman
- Producers: Kix Brooks; Tony Brown; Ronnie Dunn

Brooks & Dunn singles chronology
"Play Something Country" (2005)	"Believe" (2005)	"Building Bridges" (2006)

"Believe" is a song written by Ronnie Dunn and Craig Wiseman, and recorded by American country music duo Brooks & Dunn. It was released in October 2005 as the second single from their album Hillbilly Deluxe, and it won the Country Music Association's 2006 awards for Single of the Year, Song of the Year and Music Video of the Year. Rolling Stone ranked "Believe" No. 33 on its list of the 40 Saddest Country Songs of All Time in 2019.

== Content ==
The song is a largely acoustic ballad accompanied by acoustic guitar and organ. Featuring lead vocals from Ronnie Dunn, the song describes the narrator's childhood encounter with an old man whom he calls "Old Man Wrigley". He tells in the first verse of how he came to become friends with the old man after the narrator's mother would send him over to the old man's house with "things" (presumably food, groceries, newspapers, etc.). Through conversation, he discovers that Old Man Wrigley's wife and son have both died, and then asks the man how he is able to prevent himself from losing his sanity over their deaths. The old man then responds by saying that he will soon see them in Heaven when he dies because of his faith in God, to which he further explains to the narrator in the first chorus.

In the second verse, the narrator tells of how he discovered that Old Man Wrigley died shortly after he moved off to college. After discovering this, he reflects on his memories of the old man, stating that he felt that the man deserved to go to Heaven ("If there was ever anybody deserved a ticket to the other side / It'd be that sweet old man…"). The song's bridge then finds the narrator asserting his own faith as well while attending Old Man Wrigley's funeral.

== Accolades ==
Awards and nominations for "Believe"
Organization	Year	Category	Result
Academy of Country Music Awards	2006	Song of the Year	Won
Academy of Country Music Awards	2006	Single Record of the Year	Nominated
Academy of Country Music Awards	2006	Video of the Year	Nominated
CMT Music Awards	2006	Music Video of the Year	Nominated
CMT Music Awards	2006	Group or Duo Video of the Year	Nominated
CMT Music Awards	2006	Most Inspiring Video of the Year	Nominated
Country Music Association Awards	2006	Single of the Year	Won
Country Music Association Awards	2006	Music Video of the Year	Won

== Notable cover versions ==
R&B singer Jennifer Hudson performed the song on the 2010 CBS television special ACM Presents: Brooks & Dunn – The Last Rodeo. Hudson subsequently recorded the song as the final track on her second studio album, 2011's I Remember Me.

Brooks & Dunn re-recorded the song together with Kane Brown for their 2019 album Reboot. This version reached number 42 on the Billboard Hot Country Songs chart.

They also re-recorded the song together with Jelly Roll for their 2024 album Reboot II. They performed this song on the 58th Annual Country Music Association Awards. After their performance, their version impacted country radio on December 9, 2024.

== Chart performance ==
"Believe" debuted at number 49 on the U.S. Billboard Hot Country Singles & Tracks chart for the week of October 22, 2005.

Chart (2005–2006)	Peak position
Canada Country (Radio & Records)	21
US Hot Country Songs (Billboard)	8
US Billboard Hot 100	60
US Billboard Pop 100	95

=== Year-end charts ===
Chart (2006)	Position
US Country Songs (Billboard)	27

== Certifications ==
Region	Certification	Certified units/sales
United States (RIAA)	Platinum	1,000,000^{‡}
^{‡} Sales+streaming figures based on certification alone.
