= She Used to Be Mine (Brooks & Dunn song) =

"She Used To Be Mine"

Single by Brooks & Dunn

from the album Hard Workin' Man
- B-side: "Mexican Minutes"
- Released: August 30, 1993
- Genre: Country
- Length: 3:56
- Label: Arista 12602
- Songwriter: Ronnie Dunn
- Producers: Don Cook; Scott Hendricks

Brooks & Dunn singles chronology
"We'll Burn That Bridge" (1993)	"She Used To Be Mine" (1993)	"Rock My World (Little Country Girl)" (1993)

"She Used To Be Mine" is a song written by Ronnie Dunn, and recorded by American country music duo Brooks & Dunn. It was released in August 1993 as the third single from their album Hard Workin' Man. The song reached the top of the Billboard Hot Country Singles & Tracks (now Hot Country Songs) chart, becoming their fifth Number One single.

== Chart positions ==
"She Used to Be Mine" debuted at number 60 on the U.S. Billboard Hot Country Singles & Tracks for the week of September 4, 1993.

Chart (1993)	Peak position
Canada Country Singles (RPM)	1
US Hot Country Songs (Billboard)	1

=== Year-end charts ===
Chart (1993)	Position
Canada Country Tracks (RPM)	35
US Country Songs (Billboard)	69

== Certifications ==
Region	Certification	Certified units/sales
United States (RIAA)	Gold	500,000^{‡}
^{‡} Sales+streaming figures based on certification alone.
