= Larry Willoughby =

American singer-songwriter (1950–2021)

- Born: February 24, 1950; Sherman, Texas, U.S.
- Died: January 14, 2021 (aged 70); Sherman, Texas, U.S.
- Genres: Country
- Occupation: Singer-songwriter
- Instrument(s): Vocals, guitar
- Years active: 1983–2021
- Labels: Atlantic America

Larry Willoughby (February 24, 1950 – January 14, 2021) was an American country music singer-songwriter and the vice president of A&R at Capitol Records.

== Biography ==
Willoughby's debut album, Building Bridges, was released in 1984 by Atlantic America. Three singles were released from the album, including the title track, which was Willoughby's only single to reach the Top 60 of the Billboard Hot Country Singles chart. It was covered in 2006 by Brooks & Dunn, whose version peaked at No. 4. Another single from the album, "Heart on the Line (Operator, Operator)," was covered by Eddy Raven as "Operator, Operator" and reached the country Top 10 in 1985. Willoughby's songs have also been recorded by The Oak Ridge Boys, Waylon Jennings, and his cousin Rodney Crowell, who produced Willoughby's album.

Willoughby had Alzheimer's disease. He died in Sherman, Texas, at the age of 70, after contracting COVID-19 during the COVID-19 pandemic in Texas.

== Discography ==
=== Albums ===
Year	Album	US Country	Label
1984	Building Bridges	47	Atlantic America

=== Singles ===
Year	Single	US Country	Album
1983	"Heart on the Line (Operator, Operator)"	65	Building Bridges
1984	"Building Bridges"	55	Building Bridges
1984	"Angel Eyes"	82	Building Bridges

== Books ==
- Texas Rhythm, Texas Rhyme: A Pictorial History of Texas Music
- Texas, Our Texas
