= Hillbilly Deluxe (song) =

Single by Brooks & Dunn

from the album Hillbilly Deluxe
- Released: November 6, 2006
- Genre: Country
- Length: 4:18
- Label: Arista Nashville
- Songwriters: Brad Crisler; Craig Wiseman
- Producers: Kix Brooks; Tony Brown; Ronnie Dunn

Brooks & Dunn singles chronology
"Building Bridges" (2006)	"Hillbilly Deluxe" (2006)	"Proud of the House We Built" (2007)

"Hillbilly Deluxe" is a song written by Brad Crisler and Craig Wiseman, and recorded by American country music duo Brooks & Dunn. It was released in November 2006 as the fourth and final single and title track from the duo's album Hillbilly Deluxe. It peaked at number 16 on the U.S. Billboard Hot Country Songs chart and number 86 on the U.S. Billboard Hot 100 chart. The single was certified Gold in the U.S.

== Music video ==
The music video was directed by Michael Salomon and premiered in late 2006. It features the duo and their band performing the song at a huge barn party at night with many guests and events, as well as a huge bonfire. The first half of the video sees two men driving a monster truck into town to pick up several guests and then come back to set up, and the second half shows the actual party.

== Cover versions ==
Country music singer Miranda Lambert covered the song from The Last Rodeo Tour.

== Chart positions ==
"Hillbilly Deluxe" debuted at number 57 on the U.S. Billboard Hot Country Songs for the week of November 18, 2006.

Chart (2006–2007)	Peak position
Canada Country (Billboard)	20
US Hot Country Songs (Billboard)	16
US Billboard Hot 100	86

== Certifications ==
Region	Certification	Certified units/sales
United States (RIAA) Digital	Platinum	1,000,000^{‡}
United States (RIAA) Mastertone	Gold	500,000^{*}
^{*} Sales figures based on certification alone.^{‡} Sales+streaming figures based on certification alone.
