= Lost and Found (Brooks & Dunn song) =

Single by Brooks & Dunn

from the album Brand New Man
- B-side: "Cool Drink of Water"
- Released: September 14, 1992
- Recorded: 1991
- Genre: Country
- Length: 3:48
- Label: Arista 12460
- Songwriters: Kix Brooks; Don Cook
- Producers: Don Cook; Scott Hendricks

Brooks & Dunn singles chronology
"Boot Scootin' Boogie" (1992)	"Lost and Found" (1992)	"Hard Workin' Man" (1993)

"Lost and Found" is a song written by Kix Brooks and Don Cook and recorded by American country music duo Brooks & Dunn. It was released in September 1992 as the fifth and final single from their debut album, Brand New Man. It peaked at number 6 on the Billboard Hot Country Singles & Tracks chart. Additionally, it was the first single to feature Kix Brooks on lead vocals instead of Ronnie Dunn, and the first single of their career to miss the No. 1 spot.

American Aquarium covered the song on their 2021 album Slappers, Bangers, and Certified Twangers: Vol 1.

== Music video ==
The music video was directed by Michael Merriman and premiered in November 1992. The video was filmed in Tijuana, Mexico.

== Chart positions ==
"Lost and Found" debuted on the U.S. Billboard Hot Country Singles & Tracks for the week of September 19, 1992.

Chart (1992)	Peak position
Canada Country Singles (RPM)	6
US Hot Country Songs (Billboard)	6
