= Ronnie Dunn (album) =

Studio album by Ronnie Dunn
- Released: June 7, 2011
- Studios: Ocean Way Recording, Sound Emporium Studios, Sony/Tree Studios, The Cyber Ranch, Blackbird Studio, Sound Stage Studios, OpalOna Studios, Benchmark Sound and The Racket (Nashville, Tennessee); Dark Horse Recording and Sound Kitchen (Franklin, Tennessee)
- Genres: Country; Southern rock
- Length: 43:43
- Label: Arista Nashville
- Producer: Ronnie Dunn

Ronnie Dunn chronology
Ronnie Dunn (2011)	Peace, Love, and Country Music (2014)

Singles from Ronnie Dunn
- 1. "Bleed Red" Released: January 31, 2011; 2. "Cost of Livin'" Released: June 27, 2011; 3. "Let the Cowboy Rock" Released: January 16, 2012

Professional ratings
Review scores
Source	Rating
AllMusic	3/5 stars

Ronnie Dunn is the self-titled debut solo studio album by American country music artist Ronnie Dunn. It was released on June 7, 2011, by Arista Nashville. The album was Dunn's first release of solo music in nearly 25 years; he released three singles in the 1980s without issuing an album.

The album's first single, "Bleed Red", was released to country music radio on January 31, 2011, and became a top ten hit on the Billboard Hot Country Songs chart. A second single, "Cost of Livin'", was scheduled to be released to radio on June 27, 2011, but the single entered the country chart two weeks before its release, debuting at number 56.

== Background ==
Ronnie Dunn is Dunn's first solo music in 25 years and appeared less than a year after his split as one-half of Brooks & Dunn. Dunn wrote or co-wrote nine of the album's twelve tracks. "Bleed Red", the first single, was not one of them.

== Track listing ==
No.	Title	Writer(s)	Length
1.	"Singer In a Cowboy Band"	Ronnie Dunn, Craig Wiseman	3:31
2.	"I Don't Dance"	Dunn, David Lee Murphy, Wiseman	3:49
3.	"Your Kind of Love"	Maile Misajon, Jeremy Stover	3:35
4.	"How Far to Waco"	Dunn, Terry McBride	3:27
5.	"Once"	Jamie Floyd, Phillip LaRue, Pete Sallis	3:43
6.	"Cost of Livin'"	Phillip Coleman, Dunn	4:10
7.	"Bleed Red"	Andrew Dorff, Tommy Lee James	3:49
8.	"Last Love I'm Tryin'"	Dunn	4:07
9.	"Let the Cowboy Rock"	Dunn, Dallas Davidson	2:55
10.	"I Can't Help Myself"	Dunn, McBride	3:43
11.	"I Just Get Lonely"	Dunn	3:17
12.	"Love Owes Me One"	Dunn, McBride, Bobby Pinson	3:37

iTunes Deluxe Edition
No.	Title	Length
13.	"Boots And Diamonds"	3:28
14.	"King of All Things Lonesome"	3:50

Cracker Barrel Special Edition
No.	Title	Writer(s)	Length
1.	"I Love My Country" (previously unreleased)	Dunn, McBride, Pinson	3:10
2.	"Singer In a Cowboy Band"	Ronnie Dunn, Craig Wiseman	3:31
3.	"I Don't Dance"	Dunn, David Lee Murphy, Wiseman	3:49
4.	"Your Kind of Love"	Maile Misajon, Jeremy Stover	3:35
5.	"How Far to Waco"	Dunn, Terry McBride	3:27
6.	"Once"	Jamie Floyd, Philip LaRue, Pete Sallis	3:43
7.	"Cost of Livin'"	Phillip Coleman, Dunn	4:10
8.	"Bleed Red"	Andrew Dorff, Tommy Lee James	3:49
9.	"Last Love I'm Tryin'"	Dunn	4:07
10.	"Let the Cowboy Rock"	Dunn, Dallas Davidson	2:55
11.	"I Can't Help Myself"	Dunn, McBride	3:43
12.	"I Just Get Lonely"	Dunn	3:17
13.	"Love Owes Me One"	Dunn, McBride, Pinson	3:37
14.	"Keep On Lovin' You" (previously unreleased)	Dunn, McBride	3:16

== Personnel ==
- Ronnie Dunn – lead vocals
- Jim "Moose" Brown – acoustic piano
- Joe Hardy – acoustic piano
- Charles Judge – acoustic piano, keyboards, synthesizers
- Dwain Rowe – keyboards, organ
- Reese Wynans – acoustic piano, Hammond B3 organ, organ
- Tony King – acoustic guitar
- Pat McGrath – acoustic guitar
- Bryan Sutton – acoustic guitar, mandolin
- Lou Toomey – acoustic guitar, electric guitar
- John Willis – acoustic guitar
- J.T. Corenflos – electric guitar
- Mike Durham – electric guitar
- Kenny Greenberg – electric guitar
- Troy Lancaster – electric guitar
- Jerry McPherson – electric guitar
- Mike Payne – electric guitar
- Paul Franklin – steel guitar
- Gary Morse – steel guitar
- Mike Brignardello – bass
- Kevin "Swine" Grantt – bass
- Robbie Harrington – bass
- Michael Rhodes – bass
- Jimmie Lee Sloas – bass
- Glenn Worf – bass
- Chad Cromwell – drums
- Shawn Fichter – drums
- Shannon Forrest – drums, percussion
- Trey Gray – drums
- Brian Pruitt – drums
- Eric Darken – percussion
- Mike Haynes – trumpet
- Steve Patrick – trumpet
- Perry Coleman – backing vocals
- Melodie Crittenden – backing vocals
- Ashley Greenberg – backing vocals
- Wes Hightower – backing vocals
- Kim Keyes – backing vocals
- Kim Parent – backing vocals
- Judson Spence – backing vocals

The Nashville String Machine

- Bergen White – orchestrations and conductor
- Anthony LaMarchina – cello
- Carole Rabinowitz – cello
- Monisa Angell – viola
- Jim Grosjean – viola
- Betsy Lamb – viola
- Kristin Wilkinson – viola
- David Angell – violin
- David Davidson – violin
- Conni Ellisor – violin
- Carl Gorodetzky – violin
- Pamela Sixfin – violin
- Alan Umstead – violin
- Mary Kathryn Vanosdale – violin

== Production ==
- Gary Overton – A&R direction
- Ronnie Dunn – producer
- Jeff Balding – recording, mixing, additional recording, production assistant
- Ben Fowler – recording
- Jason Gantt – recording
- Ryan Gore – recording, digital editing
- Brian Kolb – recording
- Mike Kyle – recording
- Jeff Kersey – vocal recording, additional recording
- Chuck Ainlay – mixing
- Joe Hardy – mixing
- Joe Martino – additional recording
- Matt Helman – recording assistant
- Greg Lawrence – recording assistant
- John Palmeri – recording assistant
- Taylor Pollert – recording assistant
- Matt Coles – mix assistant
- Jim Cooley – mix assistant
- Jed Hackett – digital editing
- Chris Utley – digital editing
- Ted Jensen – mastering at Sterling Sound (New York, NY)
- Marne McLyman – production coordinator
- Terry McBride – production assistant (4, 8, 12)
- Tommy Lee James – production assistant (5, 7)
- Tony Brown – production assistant (10)
- Scott McDaniel – creative direction, cover design
- Tracy Baskette-Fleaner – art direction, package design
- Judy Forde-Blair – creative production, album notes
- Tammi Harris Cleek – imaging, photo shoot production
- Danny Clinch – photography
- Melissa Schleicher – grooming
- April Johnson – stylist
- Clarence Spalding with Spalding Entertainment – management

== Chart performance ==
Ronnie Dunn debuted at number 5 on the Billboard 200 and number one on the Top Country Albums, selling 45,000 copies in the U.S. Up to August 2016, the album had sold 266,000 copies in the US.

=== Weekly charts ===
Chart (2011)	Peak position
Canadian Albums (Billboard)	20
UK Country Albums (Official Charts)	9
US Billboard 200	5
US Top Country Albums (Billboard)	1

=== Year-end charts ===
Chart (2011)	Position
US Top Country Albums (Billboard)	43

=== Singles ===
Year	Single	Peak chart positions		
Year	Single	US Country	US	CAN
2011	"Bleed Red"	10	62	67
2011	"Cost of Livin'"	19	86	—
2012	"Let the Cowboy Rock"	31	—	—
"—" denotes releases that did not chart
