= Play Something Country =

Single by Brooks & Dunn

from the album Hillbilly Deluxe
- Released: June 6, 2005
- Genre: Country
- Length: 3:14
- Label: Arista Nashville 82876-69945
- Songwriters: Ronnie Dunn; Terry McBride
- Producers: Kix Brooks; Tony Brown; Ronnie Dunn

Brooks & Dunn singles chronology
"It's Getting Better All the Time" (2004)	"Play Something Country" (2005)	"Believe" (2005)

"Play Something Country" is a song recorded by American country music duo Brooks & Dunn, co-written by Ronnie Dunn and Terry McBride. It was released in June 2005, as the first single from the duo's album Hillbilly Deluxe. In September of that year, the song reached the top of the Billboard Hot Country Songs charts, becoming the twentieth and final number one hit of the duo's career to date.

In 2024, Brooks & Dunn re-recorded this song with American country singer-songwriter Lainey Wilson for their album Reboot II.

== Background and writing ==
The idea came to Dunn after a show in Minnesota. According to McBride, who played bass guitar in Brooks & Dunn's road band, Dunn "comes busting onto the bus and says, 'how about this idea?' and he howls that ah oooh, aw, play something country!" Inspired by Gretchen Wilson, with whom they had been touring, McBride and Dunn decided to base the song's central character on Wilson's image, creating a "ballsy chick that bursts into the barroom, puts her hand on her hip […] and goes, 'play something country!'" After McBride told Wilson that she was the inspiration for "Play Something Country," Wilson replied that she loved the song.

== Content ==
"Play Something Country" is an up-tempo song backed by electric guitar and a horn section. Its lyrics are the narrator's description of a female character who wants to hear country music.

== Music video ==
The music video was directed by Michael Salomon and premiered in mid-2005. It shows the duo performing the song in a bar with a full band, and Ronnie Dunn as a bar patron singing the song. It also shows a sassy country chick dancing and interacting with the bar patrons. At one point, she is seen using a lasso to grab one bar patron (played by NY actor Rob Findlay), then riding on his back as if he was a horse. Another scene shows her standing before the DJ and grabbing his record off his turntable, forcing him to "Play something country."

== Chart positions ==
"Play Something Country" debuted at number 37 on the U.S. Billboard Hot Country Singles & Tracks chart for the week of June 4, 2005. On the chart dated September 17, 2005, it became the twentieth and most recent Number One single of Brooks & Dunn's career.

Chart (2005)	Peak position
Canada Country (Radio & Records)	1
US Hot Country Songs (Billboard)	1
US Billboard Hot 100	37
US Billboard Pop 100	53

=== Year-end charts ===
Chart (2005)	Position
US Country Songs (Billboard)	22

== Certifications ==
Region	Certification	Certified units/sales
United States (RIAA)	Platinum	1,000,000^{‡}
^{‡} Sales+streaming figures based on certification alone.
