= Building Bridges (song) =

1984 single by Larry Willoughby

Single by Larry Willoughby

from the album Building Bridges
- Released: 1984
- Genre: Country
- Length: 3:32
- Label: Atlantic
- Songwriters: Hank DeVito, Larry Willoughby
- Producer: Rodney Crowell

Larry Willoughby singles chronology
"Heart on the Line (Operator, Operator)" (1983)	"Building Bridges" (1984)	"Angel Eyes" (1984)

"Building Bridges" is a song written and originally recorded by American country music singer-songwriter Larry Willoughby, co-written with Hank DeVito. Willoughby's version peaked at #55 on the Billboard Hot Country Singles chart in 1984.

== Chart performance ==
Chart (1984)	Peak position
US Hot Country Songs (Billboard)	55

== Nicolette Larson version ==
"Building Bridges"

Single by Nicolette Larson

from the album ...Say When
- Released: 1985
- Genre: Country
- Length: 3:48
- Label: MCA
- Songwriters: Hank DeVito, Larry Willoughby
- Producers: Tony Brown, Emory Gordy, Jr.

Nicolette Larson singles chronology
"When You Get a Little Lonely" (1985)	"Building Bridges" (1985)	"Let Me Be the First" (1986)

A year later, Nicolette Larson - the ex-wife of Hank DeVito - recorded the song on her album ...Say When. Her version went to #72 on the same chart.

=== Chart performance ===
Chart (1985)	Peak position
US Hot Country Songs (Billboard)	72

== Brooks & Dunn/Sheryl Crow/Vince Gill version ==
"Building Bridges"

Single by Brooks & Dunn featuring Sheryl Crow and Vince Gill

from the album Hillbilly Deluxe
- Released: June 5, 2006
- Studio: Ocean Way Nashville (Nashville, TN); Emerald Entertainment's tracking room (Nashville, TN); The Sound Kitchen (Nashville, TN); Starstruck Studios (Nashville, TN); Talent Shop Studios
- Genre: Country
- Length: 4:23 (album version)
- Label: Arista Nashville
- Songwriters: Hank DeVito; Larry Willoughby
- Producers: Kix Brooks; Tony Brown; Ronnie Dunn

Brooks & Dunn singles chronology
"Believe" (2005)	"Building Bridges" (2006)	"Hillbilly Deluxe" (2006)

Sheryl Crow singles chronology
"Always on Your Side" (2006)	"Building Bridges" (2006)	"Real Gone" (2006)

Vince Gill singles chronology
"The Reason Why" (2006)	"Building Bridges" (2006)	"What You Give Away" (2007)

Music video
- "Building Bridges ((Guest Vocals by Sheryl Crow and Vince Gill) Single Edit)" on YouTube

"Building Bridges" was covered by country music duo Brooks & Dunn and released as the third single released from their 2005 album Hillbilly Deluxe. It features Sheryl Crow and Vince Gill on background vocals. The song peaked at number four on the country music charts and was nominated for the Country Music Association Award for Musical Event of the Year.

=== Critical reception ===
Deborah Evans Price of Billboard described the single favorably, saying that Dunn's "lead vocal is as compelling as always." She also thought that Gill's and Crow's voices made the song "distinctive".

=== Music video ===
The music video takes place in the desert with the band and the duo singing in front of big screens at dusk. The music video was directed by Shaun Silva.

=== Chart performance ===
Chart (2006)	Peak position
Canada Country (Billboard)	2
US Hot Country Songs (Billboard)	4
US Billboard Hot 100	66

==== Year-end charts ====
Chart (2006)	Position
US Country Songs (Billboard)	29

== Other versions ==
The song was sung by Steve Sanders as a member of The Mighty Oaks Band (the stage band for The Oak Ridge Boys) as a band feature from 1982-1986. The Mighty Oaks Band also recorded the song, but the recording was never commercially released. Their rendition can be heard on various live concert radio broadcasts from that time period.
