= Ronnie Dunn =

American singer-songwriter (born 1953)

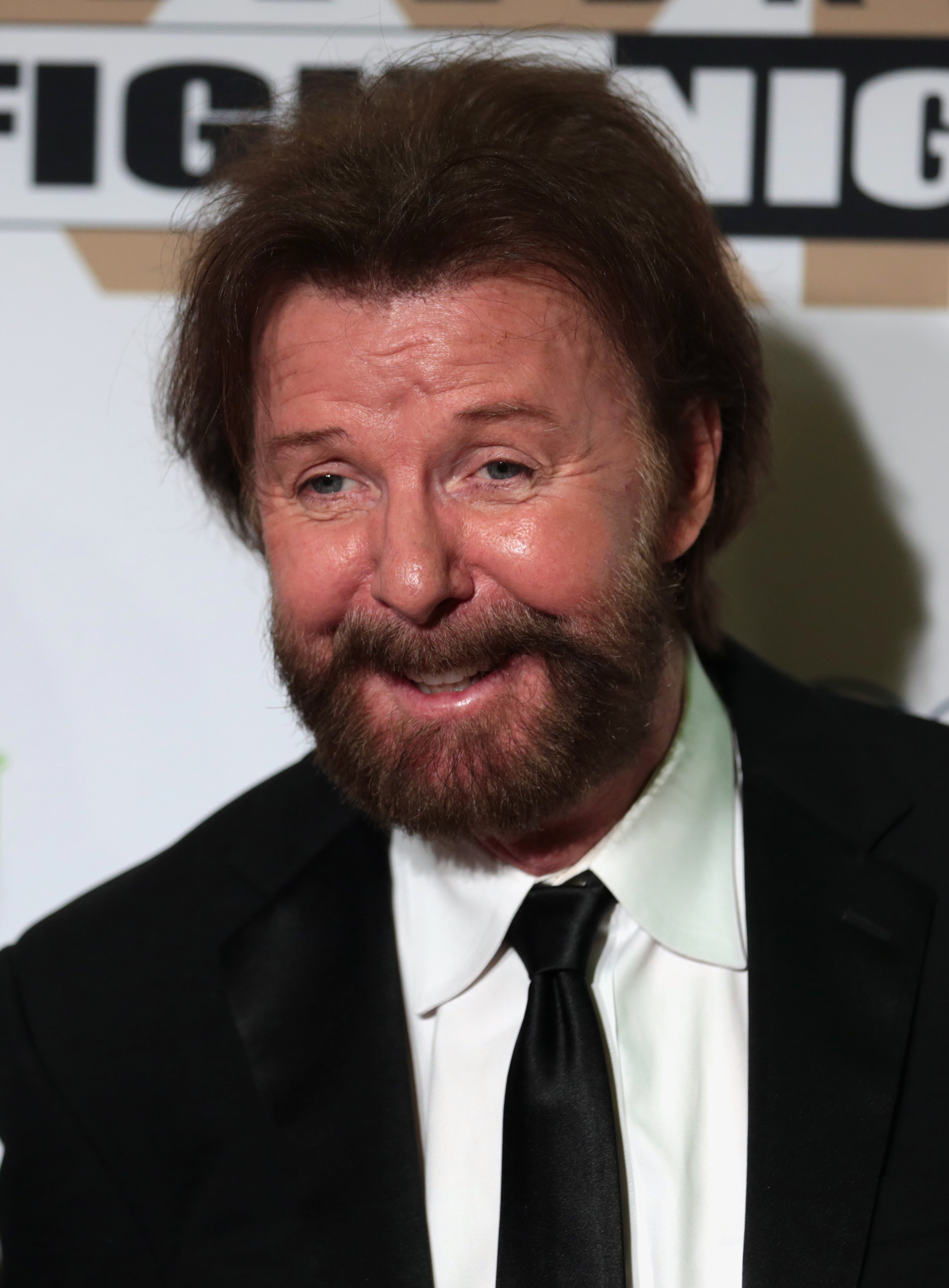
- Dunn in 2017

Background information
- Born: Ronald Gene Dunn; June 1, 1953 (age 73); Coleman, Texas, U.S.
- Origin: Tulsa, Oklahoma, U.S.
- Genre: Country
- Occupations: Singer; songwriter; musician
- Instruments: Vocals; guitar
- Years active: 1983–present
- Labels: MCA/Churchill; Arista Nashville; Little Will-E; NASH Icon; Big Machine
- Member of: Brooks & Dunn
- Spouse: Janine Dunn (m. 1990)
- Website: ronniedunn.com

Ronald Gene Dunn (born June 1, 1953) is an American country music singer-songwriter and record executive. Starting in 2011, Dunn has worked as a solo artist following the temporary dissolution of Brooks & Dunn. He released his self-titled debut album for Arista Nashville on June 7, 2011, reaching the Top 10 with its lead-off single, "Bleed Red". After leaving Arista Nashville in 2012, Dunn founded Little Will-E Records. On April 8, 2014, Ronnie Dunn released his second solo album, Peace, Love, and Country Music through Little Will-E Records. On November 11, 2016, he released his third album Tattooed Heart on NASH Icon label. His fourth album Re-Dunn was released on January 10, 2020.

In 2019, Dunn was inducted into the Country Music Hall of Fame as a member of Brooks & Dunn.

== Early life ==
Dunn was born in Coleman, Texas, and attended 13 schools in his first 12 years of school. He began school in New Mexico, and finished his formal education at Abilene Christian University in 1975 as a psychology major. While playing bass guitar and singing with bands in clubs in the Abilene, Texas, area, the university gave him the choice of either quitting the band or the university. He left the university, then moved to Tulsa, Oklahoma, for a chance at the country music scene. He lived there for many years while drawing much inspiration from local honky tonks such as Tulsa City Limits, prominently featured in the music video for Brooks & Dunn's hit "Boot Scootin' Boogie". While in college, he served as a music and youth minister at Avoca Baptist Church in Avoca, Texas.

== Musical career ==
=== Brooks & Dunn ===
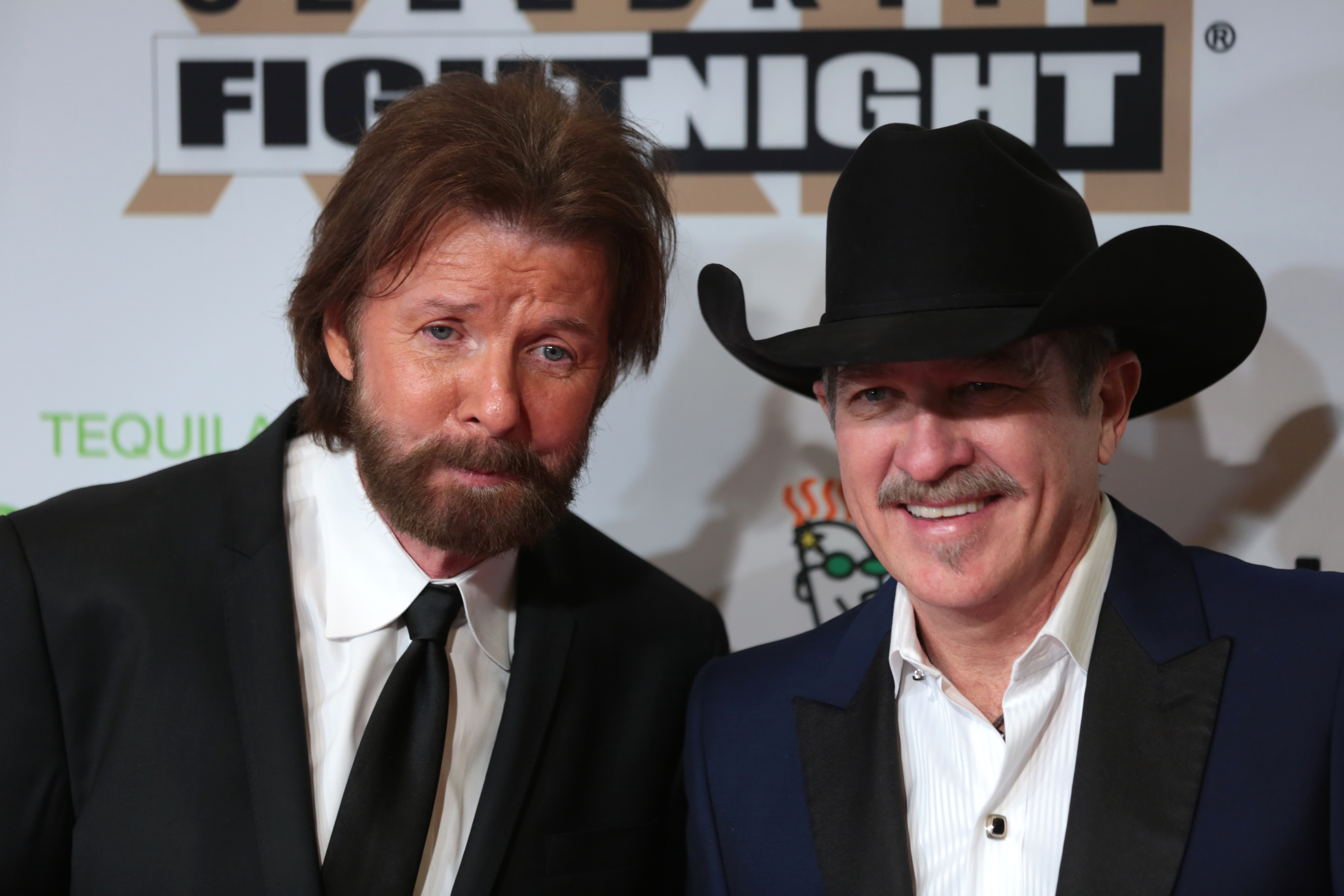
Dunn and Kix Brooks in 2017

Dunn began his musical career as a solo artist. He charted two minor singles with Churchill/MCA Records: in 1983, he released "It's Written All Over Your Face", and in 1984, "She Put the Sad in All His Songs". In 1990, Kix Brooks and he formed Brooks & Dunn. In 1991, they released their first album, Brand New Man, certified six-times platinum by the RIAA. Brooks & Dunn released 12 studio albums, two greatest-hits albums, and a Christmas album.

Brooks & Dunn sold over 30 million albums, had 20 number-one singles on Billboard, and were one of the most consistently successful acts on the concert circuit. In 2009, they announced they were temporarily disbanding in 2010. On December 3, 2014, Brooks & Dunn reunited, and along with Reba McEntire, performed a series of concerts throughout the summer and fall of 2015.

=== 2011–2012: Debut solo album and departure from Sony ===
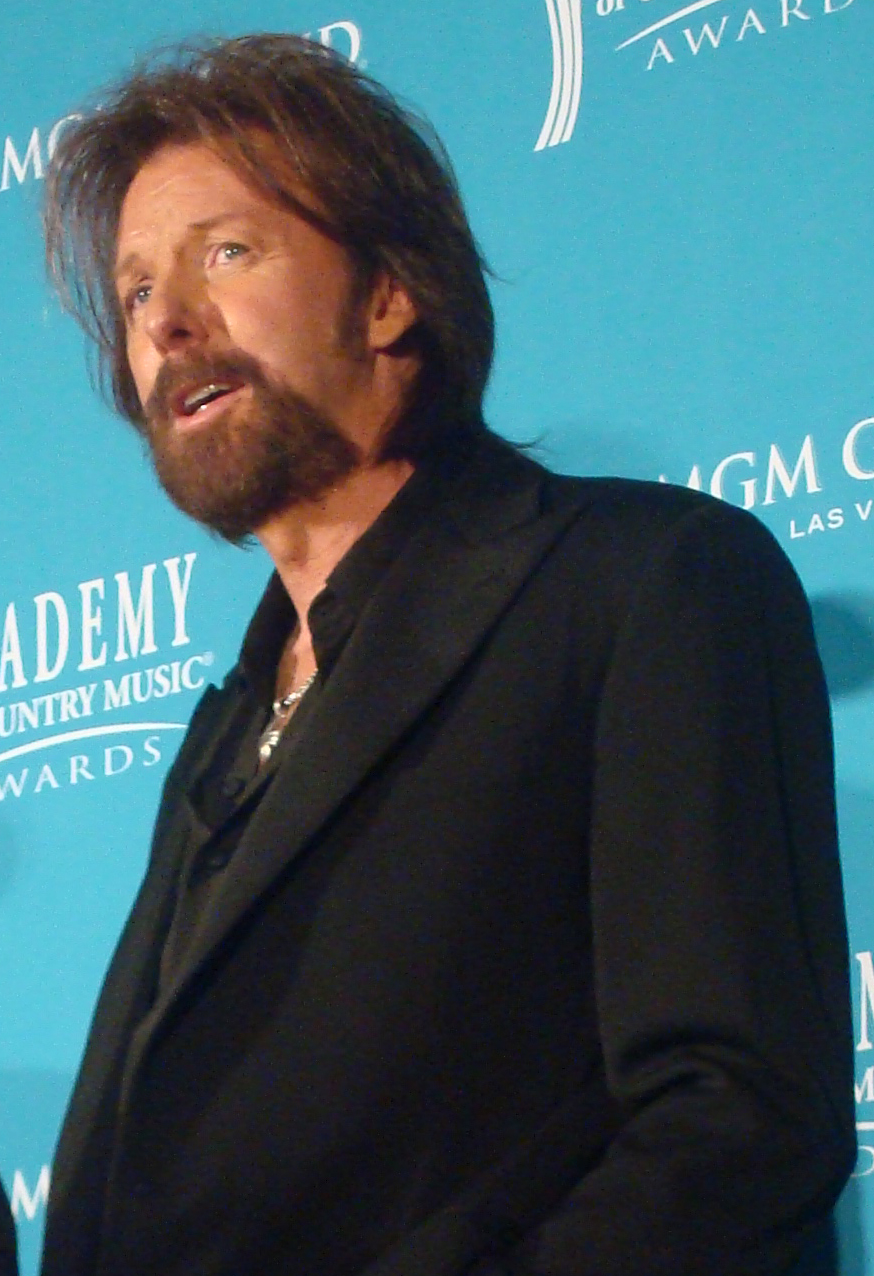
Dunn in April 2010

In late 2010, Dunn announced that he was working on a solo album. The album's first single, "Bleed Red", was released to country radio on January 29, 2011, and debuted at number 30 on the Billboard Hot Country Songs chart for the week ending February 19, 2011, and ended as a top 10, his first of his solo career. Dunn's self-titled album Ronnie Dunn was released on June 7, 2011. The second single from the album, "Cost of Livin'", was released on June 6, 2011, and debuted at number 56 on the country chart. It peaked at number 19, followed by "Let the Cowboy Rock" at number 31. The album debuted at number one on the Billboard Top Country Albums, as well as number five on the Billboard 200, selling 45,000 copies in its first week in the US.

In June 2012, Ronnie Dunn took to social media to ask his fans what the fourth single on the album should be. Shortly after, Ronnie got a call from the executives at Sony Music saying that his "fb post killed the 'Let the Cowboy Rock' single". He then requested for radio to start playing "Once" as the next single. Before the song could be released to radio as a single, he was released from the label.

=== 2013–2014: Little Will-E Records and Peace, Love, and Country Music ===
In March 2013, Ronnie Dunn previewed the song "Country This" on SoundCloud. On June 4, 2013, Ronnie released the two new tracks, "Country This" and "Kiss You There", exclusively on iTunes. The songs were each previewed for a month on The Highway on Sirius XM.

On July 9, 2013, Dunn announced his new record deal, a joint effort between HitShop Records and his own label Little Will-E Records with HitShop executing radio promotion while Dunn retains personal brand control. The lead-off single for his second solo album, "Kiss You There", was released to country radio on July 29, 2013. After an unsuccessful run with it, Dunn and HitShop Records parted ways.

On November 19, 2013, Dunn released the second single from the forthcoming album, "Wish I Still Smoked Cigarettes". In January 2014, Dunn also released "Grown Damn Man" as a promotional single from the second solo album. The album, Peace, Love and Country Music, was released on April 8, 2014.

=== 2014–2018: Nash Icon record deal and Tattooed Heart ===
On December 1, 2014, Ronnie Dunn began to speculate on his Facebook page that he had signed with the newest imprint of Big Machine Label Group, NASH Icon, but the label never confirmed nor denied it. On January 12, 2015, the president of Big Machine, Scott Borchetta, officially announced that Dunn had joined Reba McEntire and Martina McBride, making him the third artist to join the roster. Borchetta stated in a press release, "Ronnie Dunn has one of the smoothest, most-recognized, and most-popular voices of the last 25 years in country music. I'm truly honored to have him join us and take his rightful place as an icon. Great music is on the way." Dunn also commented in the article, saying, "This is the best possible scenario that I can imagine. The Big Machine and Cumulus combination is a force, and I am proud to be included in this innovative venture." The press release went on to announce Ronnie Dunn was about to hit the studio to record what is now his third solo album and that the lead-off single of the album was released in early spring of 2015.

The lead single from Dunn's third solo album, "Ain't No Trucks in Texas", was released on July 17, 2015. On April 22, 2016, Dunn announced the second single, "Damn Drunk", on his Facebook page. The song was released August 5, 2016. On August 22, 2016, Dunn announced that the title of his third solo album was Tattooed Heart; it was released on November 11, 2016.

=== 2019–present: Reboot and Re-Dunn ===
In 2019, Brooks & Dunn returned to the studio for the first time since the release of their 2009 compilation, #1s... and Then Some. The result was a new album, Reboot, a collection of some of Brooks & Dunn's greatest hits re-recorded as duets between the duo and up-and-coming country music stars. The album was released on April 5, 2019. It debuted at number one on Billboard's Top Country Albums chart.

Dunn performed at the 2019 Musicians Hall of Fame and Museum Concert and Induction Ceremony.

Dunn announced in 2019 that he would be releasing a covers album in January 2020. Titled Re-Dunn, the album is a collection of 24 classic rock and country covers. A cover of "Amarillo by Morning" was released on September 6, 2019.

== Personal life ==
Dunn married his wife, Janine, on May 19, 1990; they have three children.

== Awards ==
As a member of Brooks and Dunn, Dunn has 30 ACM awards, winning Top Vocal Duo every year since 1991, except for 2000 (the honor went to Montgomery Gentry) and 2008 (in which Sugarland won), before winning the award for the last time in 2009. The duo also won three Entertainer of the Year awards and Vocal Event of the Year in 2005, for their hit "Building Bridges" with Vince Gill and Sheryl Crow's background vocals, along with Single of the Year for the gospel song "Believe." That same year, Brooks and Dunn were part of a group of country artists presented with the new Triple Crown Award by the Academy of Country Music, which recognized the amazing feat of winning Top New Artist (or Duo/Group), Top Vocalist (or Duo/Group), and Entertainer of the Year. He is a member of the Texas, Oklahoma and Arkansas Music Halls of Fame. With 18 won, Brooks and Dunn are tied for the most Country Music Association awards wins, sharing the honor with Vince Gill. They have the second-most Academy of Country Music awards with 30, surpassed only by Miranda Lambert with 35. Dunn was also the National Anthem singer before Game 3 of the 2011 World Series in Arlington, Texas. As a solo artist, Dunn has two Grammy nominations and over 23 Broadcast Music Incorporated (BMI) Million-Airplay awards. He was the BMI Country Music Songwriter of the Year in 1996 and 2001.

Year	Association	Category	Result
2011	Inspirational Country Music Awards	Mainstream Inspirational Country Song - "Bleed Red"	Nominated
2013	55th Grammy Awards	Best Country Song- "Cost of Livin'"	Nominated
2013	55th Grammy Awards	Best Country Solo Performance- "Cost of Livin'"	Nominated

== Discography ==
=== Studio albums ===
Title	Details	Peak chart positions				Title
Title	Details	US Country	US	CAN	UK Country	Title
Ronnie Dunn	Release date: June 7, 2011; Label: Arista Nashville; Formats: CD, music download	1	5	20	9	US: 266,000
Peace, Love, and Country Music	Release date: April 8, 2014; Label: Little Will-E Records; Formats: CD, music download	—	—	—	—	
Tattooed Heart	Release date: November 11, 2016; Label: Nash Icon; Formats: CD, music download	3	33	90	—	US: 40,600
Re-Dunn	Release date: January 10, 2020; Label: Little Will-E Records; Formats: CD, music download	17	169	—	—	US: 10,100
100 Proof Neon	Release date: July 29, 2022; Label: Little Will-E Records; Formats: CD, music download	49	—	—	—	
"—" denotes releases that did not chart

=== Singles ===
Year	Single	Peak chart positions				Album
Year	Single	US Country	US Country Airplay	US	CAN	Album
1983	"It's Written All Over Your Face"	59	—	—	—	—N/a
1984	"She Put the Sad in All His Songs"	59	—	—	—	—N/a
1984	"Jessie"	—	—	—	—	—N/a
2011	"Bleed Red"	10	—	62	78	Ronnie Dunn
2011	"Cost of Livin'"	19	—	86	—	Ronnie Dunn
2012	"Let the Cowboy Rock"	31	—	—	—	Ronnie Dunn
2013	"Kiss You There"	—	60	—	—	Peace, Love, and Country Music
2013	"I Wish I Still Smoked Cigarettes"	—	—	—	—	Peace, Love, and Country Music
2015	"Ain't No Trucks in Texas"	—	42	—	—	Tattooed Heart
2016	"Damn Drunk" (featuring Kix Brooks)	42	36	—	—	Tattooed Heart
2017	"I Worship the Woman You Walked On"	—	46	—	—	Tattooed Heart
2017	"That's Why They Make Jack Daniels"	—	51	—	—	Tattooed Heart
2022	"Broken Neon Hearts"	—	—	—	—	100 Proof Neon
"—" denotes releases that did not chart

=== Featured singles ===
Year	Single	Artist	Peak positions			Album
Year	Single	Artist	US Country	US Country Airplay	CAN Country	Album
1994	"Take These Chains from My Heart"	Lee Roy Parnell	17		21	On the Road
2007	"I Don't Want To"	Ashley Monroe	37		—	Satisfied
2009	"Garth Must Be Busy"	Cledus T. Judd	—		—	Polyrically Uncorrect
2014	"Pray for Peace"	Reba McEntire	—	—	—	Love Somebody
2023	"Rodeo Man"	Garth Brooks	—	25	—	Time Traveler
"—" denotes releases that did not chart

=== Other appearances ===
Year	Song	Album
2013	"Baby, It's Cold Outside" (Kelly Clarkson featuring Ronnie Dunn)	Wrapped in Red
2018	"The Crossing" (feat. The Blind Boys of Alabama)	King of the Road: A Tribute to Roger Miller

=== Music videos ===
Year	Video	Director
2011	"Bleed Red"	Thien Phan
2011	"Love Owes Me One"	Thien Phan
2011	"I Can't Help Myself"	Thien Phan
2011	"How Far to Waco"	Thien Phan
2011	"Cost of Livin'"	Thien Phan
2012	"Let the Cowboy Rock"	Thien Phan
2013	"Kiss You There"	Sherman Halsey
2014	"You Don't Know Me"	
2015	"Ain't No Trucks In Texas"	Peter Zavadil
2016	"Damn Drunk"	TK McKamy
