= Keep On Loving You =

Keep On Loving You may refer to:

- "Keep On Loving You" (song), a song by REO Speedwagon from the album Hi Infidelity
- "Keep On Lovin' You", a song by Steel Magnolia from the album Steel Magnolia
- Keep On Loving You (album), a 2009 album by Reba McEntire
  - "I Keep On Loving You", a single from this album
