= Until They Don't Love You =

Single by Reba

from the album Love Somebody
- Released: August 7, 2015
- Genre: Country; contemporary country
- Length: 3:05
- Label: Big Machine; Nash Icon
- Songwriters: Shane McAnally; Lori McKenna; Josh Osborne
- Producers: Tony Brown; Reba McEntire

Reba singles chronology
"Going Out Like That" (2015)	"Until They Don't Love You" (2015)	"Just Like Them Horses" (2016)

"Until They Don't Love You" is a song recorded by American country artist Reba. It was composed by Shane McAnally, Lori McKenna and Josh Osborne. The song was released as a single via Nash Icon Records in 2015 and was the second single spawned from Reba's 2015 album Love Somebody. "Until They Don't Love You" was generally met with favorable reviews and charted on the American country songs survey in 2015.

== Background and content ==
Following a brief stint on the television sitcom Malibu Country, Reba signed a recording contract with Nash Icon Records, an imprint label of Big Machine Records. The label focused on promoting and releasing new music by veteran country recording artists. Her first album with Nash Icon was 2015's Love Somebody and featured the track "Until They Don't Love You". The song was written by Shane McAnally, Lori McKenna and Josh Osborne. Both McAnally and Osborne contributed to additional tracks on Love Somebody. The publication Sounds Like Nashville described "Until They Don't Love You" as "a self-reflective look at regret over ending a relationship." "The energy and sass of ‘Until They Don’t Love You’ mimics ‘Going Out Like That’ but takes it up another notch," Reba commented in an announcement.

== Critical reception ==
"Until They Don't Love You" mostly received favorable reviews. In his review of Love Somebody, Stephen Thomas Erlewine of AllMusic named the track an "album pick". Taste of Country called the recording "an all-out jam that turns the bucket seats of any car or truck into the front row of McEntire’s concert." In another review, Rolling Stone called it a "bluesy new breakup tune". In a separate review, Jewly Hight of Billboard found the song to be among one of Love Somebody's unfavorable tunes, calling it an "overcooked blues-rocker".

== Release and chart performance ==
"Until They Don't Love You" was first released to radio on August 7, 2015, as the second single from Love Somebody. The track had originally been released on the disc in April 2015 and was preceded by its first single titled "Going Out Like That". Reba promoted the single on an episode of The Tonight Show Starring Jimmy Fallon also in August 2015. The song spent a total of nine weeks on the Billboard Country Airplay chart, peaking at number 48 in September 2015. It was McEntire's third single to miss the Billboard country top 40 since 1977, with her last to reach such a position was in 2011 with "Somebody's Chelsea".

== Track listing ==
Digital single

- "Until They Don't Love You" – 3:05

== Charts ==
Chart performance for "Until They Don't Love You"
Chart (2015)	Peak position
US Hot Country Songs (Billboard)	48
