= Turn On the Radio =

Single by Reba

from the album All the Women I Am
- Released: July 19, 2010
- Genre: Country
- Length: 3:35
- Label: Starstruck/Valory
- Songwriters: Cherie Oakley; Mark Oakley; Bobby Huff
- Producer: Dann Huff

Reba singles chronology
"I Keep On Loving You" (2010)	"Turn On the Radio" (2010)	"If I Were a Boy" (2011)

"Turn On the Radio" is a song written by Mark Oakley, Cherie Oakley and J. P. Twang, and recorded by American country music singer Reba McEntire to serve as the lead single for her 34th career album, All the Women I Am, which was released on November 9, 2010. It was released to country radio on July 7, 2010, and debuted at number 54 on the U.S. Billboard Hot Country Songs chart for the week of July 24, 2010. It was released as a digital download in the U.S. on August 3, 2010.

== Content ==
Mark and Cherie Oakley wrote the song with Bobby Huff, who used the pseudonym "J.P. Twang". Cherie said in an interview with the blog The Boot, "The song started with just a simple idea: a strong woman who had been done wrong by her man, and now he wants to get back in touch. We all sat down one morning in May in our home studio, and Mark began playing a riff on his guitar. This really set the stage for the entire attitude of the song. With that and the basic idea, it just all started flowing out of us. Different melody ideas and lyrics just came pouring out."

== Critical reception ==
The song has received mixed reviews from music critics. Kevin John Coyne of Country Universe rated the song a D, stating until McEntire put out something better, he would keep listening to "Consider Me Gone." Matt Bjorke of Roughstock gave the song 4 and a 1/2 stars out of 5, stating that "in the hands of a less-seasoned vocalist this song could’ve been something horribly lacking but in Reba’s hand’s it’s a remarkable success."

== Promotion ==
McEntire performed the song thus-far on three occasions. First, being on the release date of her new album All The Women I Am (November 9, 2010), was on Good Morning America. The second was November 12, 2010 on the Late Show with David Letterman. And the third on the first annual American Country Awards.

== Music video ==
The video for the song was directed by Randee St. Nicholas, and was released in August 2010. Filmed over 2 days in a warehouse in Nashville (a lightning storm and tornado warning pushed shooting an extra day), the video begins with Reba wearing a black hooded cloak humming the song to herself while entering the warehouse as a train passes by. She is then seen in a dimly lit hallway with swinging lights hanging above her. After taking her things off, she takes out a box-cutter and opens boxes containing radios, which she puts on a rack filled with other radios. She then proceeds to sing the song into a microphone to a guy sitting in a chair, who just stares into space and remains blank-faced. Reba then turns on every radio on the rack behind her as she continues singing to the guy. As the final chorus hits, she ties the man up with her microphone cord, puts on her things, and leaves. As Reba gets into her car, the tied up guy finally realizes how he treated Reba, and opens his iPhone to see multiple text messages sent to him by Reba that read "Turn On The RADIO!!!!!!"

== Chart performance ==
"Turn On the Radio" debuted at number 54 on the Billboard Hot Country Songs chart for the week of July 24, 2010. The single is McEntire's 60th Top 10 single on the country charts, making her the first female country artist in history to achieve that many top 10 hits. The song peaked at number one on the Billboard Hot Country Songs chart for the week of January 1, 2011, making it McEntire's 25th and final number 1 song on the chart as of 2024, tying Dolly Parton for most number 1 songs by a female country artist.

Chart (2010–2011)	Peak position
Canada Hot 100 (Billboard)	67
Canada Country (Billboard)	1
US Billboard Hot 100	53
US Hot Country Songs (Billboard)	1

=== Year-end charts ===
Chart (2010)	Position
US Country Songs (Billboard)	56
Chart (2011)	Position
US Country Songs (Billboard)	61

== Certifications ==
Region	Certification	Certified units/sales
United States (RIAA)	Gold	500,000^{‡}
^{‡} Sales+streaming figures based on certification alone.
