= Just Like Them Horses =

Single by Reba

from the album Love Somebody
- Released: January 19, 2016
- Genre: Country
- Length: 4:28
- Label: Big Machine; Nash Icon
- Songwriter(s): Liz Hengber; Tommy Lee James
- Producer(s): Tony Brown; Reba McEntire

Reba singles chronology
| "Until They Don't Love You" (2015) | "Just Like Them Horses" (2016) | "Softly and Tenderly" (2016) |

"Just Like Them Horses" is a song recorded by American country artist Reba. It was composed by Liz Hengber and Tommy Lee James. The song was issued as a single via Nash Icon Records in 2016. The song was the third release spawned from Reba's 2015 album Love Somebody. "Just Like Them Horses" was generally met with favorable reviews and charted on the American country songs survey in 2016.

== Background and content ==
"Just Like Them Horses" was first penned by Liz Hengber, who had written the song in response to her friend dying of cancer. Because she could not finish the track, she had Tommy Lee James help her finish it. Reba chose to record the song because it reminded her of her father. She had intended to record an acoustic version for her father's funeral, knowing that he was coming to the end of his life. However, Reba ultimately recorded the song for her 2015 album upon the encouragement of producer Tony Brown. Reba also served as co-producer on the recording, credited under her full name "Reba McEntire".

== Critical reception ==
"Just Like Them Horses" received a favorable response from reviewers. Taste of Country praised its traditional production arrangement and Reba's vocals in their review of the song: "Brown's arrangement is still simple and vulnerable. Fiddle and piano drive the song, but it's McEntire's fragile performance — especially during and after the second-to-last chorus — that makes the song so memorable." The Oklahoman described the song as a "poignant tribute to her late father", further calling it an "achingly lovely ballad". Country Living commented, "For Reba McEntire, 'Just Like Them Horses,' is so much more than a track off of her latest album, Love Somebody—it's an emotional tribute to her father, who passed away just after she recorded the song in October 2014."

== Release, chart performance and music video ==
"Just Like Them Horses" was originally released on Reba's 2015 studio album titled Love Somebody. It was later released as a single on January 19, 2016, becoming the third single issued from the album. "Just Like Them Horses" spent one week on the Billboard Hot Country Songs chart, peaking at number 37 in February 2016. A black and white music video was released at the same time of the single's announcement. The video's concept was created by Reba herself, who filmed it using drones at a ranch in Chockie, Oklahoma. Also featured in the video is Reba's mother, Jacqueline McEntire.

== Track listing ==
Digital single

- "Just Like Them Horses" – 4:28

== Charts ==
Chart performance for "Just Like Them Horses"
| Chart (2016) | Peak position |
|---|---|
| US Hot Country Songs (Billboard) | 37 |
