= All the Women I Am =

Studio album by Reba McEntire
- Released: November 9, 2010
- Recorded: 2010
- Studios: Starstruck Studios and Blackbird Studio (Nashville, Tennessee)
- Genre: Country
- Length: 37:56
- Label: Starstruck/Valory
- Producer: Dann Huff

Reba McEntire chronology
Keep On Loving You (2009)	All the Women I Am (2010)	Love Somebody (2015)

Singles from All the Women I Am
- 1. "Turn On the Radio" Released: July 19, 2010; 2. "If I Were a Boy" Released: January 24, 2011; 3. "When Love Gets a Hold of You" Released: April 11, 2011; 4. "Somebody's Chelsea" Released: August 29, 2011

All the Women I Am is the twenty-eighth studio album by American country music singer Reba McEntire. It was released November 9, 2010, through the Valory Music Group, a division of Big Machine Records. Its first single is "Turn On the Radio", which was released in July and debuted at #54 and peaked at #1 in January 2011. The second single "If I Were a Boy" and was released in January 2011 and re-entered the Billboard Country Charts at #60, peaking at #22 in April 2011. The third single, "When Love Gets a Hold of You", was released on April 11, 2011, peaking at #40 in six weeks. McEntire's fourth single from the album was "Somebody's Chelsea," which peaked at #44. The album was produced by Dann Huff. As of 2012 it is her 1st studio album since 1984's Just a Little Love not to be certified.

== Background ==
The title of the album relates to the many roles that McEntire plays in her life. Asked once in an interview for a ranking, McEntire responded, "Mother first, wife second, and the rest just follow." The album features a cover of American recording artist Beyoncé's single "If I Were a Boy". McEntire's version became a viral video when she first performed the song on CMT's Unplugged earlier in 2010. Reba's next album was supposed to be a Christmas album but the song 'If I Were a Boy' changed McEntire's mind.

== Critical reception ==
Professional ratings
Review scores
Source	Rating
Allmusic	2.5/5 stars
Associated Press	mixed
Billboard	favorable
The Boston Globe	(Positive)
Country Weekly	4/5 stars
Roughstock	3.5/5 stars
USA Today	3/4 stars
The Washington Post	mixed
Engine 145	3.5/5 stars

Upon its release, All the Women I Am received generally positive reviews from most music critics. At Metacritic, which assigns a normalized rating out of 100 to reviews from mainstream critics, the album received an average score of 74, based on 5 reviews, which indicates "generally favorable reviews".

Michael McCall with the Associated Press gave it a mixed review, saying "at age 55, McEntire remains a powerhouse who tends to err by trying harder than necessary to show her range". Jessica Phillips of Country Weekly gave the album four star rating, calling the release "[an] emotionally charged set of songs" and commended her cover of "If I Were A Boy", calling it a "soulful, countrified look at love from a male perspective".

Giving the release a 3½ star rating, Matt Bjorke of Roughstock, saying "All The Woman I Am had the potential to be a missed-opportunity after the first two tracks on the record but the album is saved by a meaty collection of songs that hopefully will find Reba retaining her current resurgence at radio". Allison Stewart with The Washington Post'' compared the album to its predecessor, Keep On Loving You, saying that the album "tries harder, with worse results; McEntire and her collaborators aim for Carrie Underwood and too often wind up with warmed-over Shania Twain". On a positive note, she called her version of "If I Were a Boy" "fantastic". Thom Jurek with Allmusic gave the release a 2½ rating, saying "Everything, from songs and arrangements to production tries hard to sound on the contemporary edge, but comes off as underscoring that Underwood has the corner on this sound [...] ultimately, All the Women I Am falls flat; it feels awkward in its stylistic mimicry, and has no center".

Steve Morse with The Boston Globe called it "one of her best effort", saying "It blends hard-edged, modern country-rock with some profoundly tender ballad singing". Blake Boldt with "Engine 145" gave it a 3½ star rating, saying "Women is a crash course in dealing with emotional hurdles. There’s a great deal of value when McEntire sings about volatile emotions, and she builds a rapport with female listeners by admitting her own frailties".

== Commercial performance ==
The album debuted at number seven on the U.S. Billboard 200, and at number three on the Top Country Albums chart, selling 64,174 copies in its first week of release. The album has sold 347,000 copies in the US as of April 2015.

== Track listing ==
No.	Title	Writer(s)	Length
1.	"Turn On the Radio"	Cherie Oakley, Mark Oakley, Bobby Huff	3:35
2.	"If I Were a Boy"	BC Jean, Toby Gad	3:52
3.	"The Bridge You Burn"	Tony Martin, Wendell Mobley, Neil Thrasher	3:34
4.	"Cry"	Brandy Clark, Shane McAnally	3:25
5.	"When Love Gets a Hold of You"	Jessi Alexander, Gary Nicholson, Jon Randall	3:34
6.	"Somebody's Chelsea"	Reba McEntire, Liz Hengber, Will Robinson	4:33
7.	"All the Women I Am"	Kent Blazy, Marv Green, McAnally	4:35
8.	"The Day She Got Divorced"	Clark, McAnally, Mark D. Sanders	3:32
9.	"A Little Want To"	Brice Long, Terry McBride	3:07
10.	"When You Have a Child"	Tom Douglas	4:09
Total length:			37:56

Deluxe Edition Bonus Track
No.	Title	Writer(s)	Length
11.	"I Want a Cowboy" (Dance remix)	Katrina Elam, David Davidson, Wayne Kirkpatrick, Jimmie Lee Sloas	3:49

Deluxe Edition DVD
No.	Title	Length
1.	"AOL Sessions Consider Me Gone"
2.	"AOL Sessions Strange"
3.	"AOL Sessions Eight Crazy Hours (In The Story of Love)"
4.	"AOL Sessions I Want A Cowboy"
5.	"AOL Sessions Interview"
6.	"CMT Unplugged If I Were A Boy"
7.	"Behind The Scenes: Reba "Turn On The Radio" music video shoot"
8.	"Turn On The Radio" music video"

== Personnel ==
Adapted from the album's liner notes.

=== Musicians ===
- Reba McEntire – lead vocals
- Charlie Judge – keyboards, synthesizers, strings, horns, Rhodes electric piano, clavinet, Hammond B3 organ, loop programming
- Gordon Mote – acoustic piano
- Steve Nathan – acoustic piano, Hammond B3 organ
- Jimmy Nichols – acoustic piano, Wurlitzer electric piano
- Tom Bukovac – electric guitar
- J.T. Corenflos – electric guitar
- Dann Huff – electric guitar, acoustic guitar, banjo
- Jerry McPherson – acoustic guitar, electric guitar
- Ilya Toshinsky – acoustic guitar, electric guitar, banjo, mandolin
- Bruce Bouton – steel guitar
- Paul Franklin – steel guitar, dobro
- Jimmie Lee Sloas – bass
- Shannon Forrest – drums
- Scott Williamson – drums
- David Huff – percussion, programming
- Eric Darken – percussion
- Mark Douthit – saxophone
- Stuart Duncan – fiddle
- Jonathan Yudkin – fiddle
- Vicki Hampton – backing vocals
- Joanna Janét – backing vocals
- Cherie Oakley – backing vocals
- Angela Primm – backing vocals
- Russell Terrell – backing vocals
- Jenifer Wrinkle – backing vocals

The Nashville String Machine (Tracks 8 & 10)

- Charlie Judge – string arrangements and conductor
- Carl Gorodetzky – string contractor
- Anthony LaMarchina and Carole Rabinowitz – cello
- Jim Grosjean, Betty Lamb and Kristin Wilkinson – viola
- Janet Darnall, Conni Ellisor, Stefan Petrescu, Pamela Sixfin, Alan Umstead, Cathy Umstead and Karen Winklemann – violin

=== Production ===
- Allison Jones – A&R
- Velvet Reid – A&R
- Dann Huff – producer
- Brent King – recording
- Steve Marcantonio – recording, mixing (3–10)
- Justin Niebank – recording, mixing (1, 2)
- Mark Hagen – additional recording
- Seth Morton – additional recording
- Drew Bollman – recording assistant, mix assistant (1, 2)
- Tristan Brock-Jones – recording assistant
- Steve Blackmon – mix assistant (3–10)
- David Huff – digital editing
- Christopher Rowe – digital editing
- Adam Ayan – mastering (1) at Gateway Mastering (Portland, Maine)
- Hank Williams – mastering (2–10) at MasterMix (Nashville, Tennessee)
- Mike "Frog" Griffith – production coordinator
- Whitney Sutton – copy coordinator
- Austin Hale – package design
- Aaron Rayburn – package design
- Josh Shearon – package design
- Russ Harrington – photography
- Justin Nolan Key – photography
- Brett Freedman – hair stylist, make-up
- Terry Gordon – wardrobe stylist

== Charts ==
=== Weekly charts ===
Chart (2010)	Peak position
Canadian Albums (Billboard)	14
UK Country Albums (Official Charts)	3
US Billboard 200	7
US Top Country Albums (Billboard)	3

=== Year-end charts ===
Chart (2010)	Position
US Top Country Albums (Billboard)	72
Chart (2011)	Position
US Billboard 200	167
US Top Country Albums (Billboard)	31

=== Singles ===
Year	Single	Peak chart positions		
Year	Single	US Country	US	CAN
2010	"Turn On the Radio"	1	53	67
2011	"If I Were a Boy"	22	123	—
2011	"When Love Gets a Hold of You"	40	—	—
2011	"Somebody's Chelsea"	44	—	—
"—" denotes releases that did not chart

== Release history ==
Country	Date
United States	November 9, 2010
Canada	November 9, 2010
Australia	November 12, 2010
United Kingdom	February 20, 2012
