= Strange (Reba McEntire song) =

Single by Reba

from the album Keep On Loving You
- Released: April 6, 2009
- Genre: Country
- Length: 2:59
- Label: Starstruck Records/Valory Music Co.
- Songwriters: Wendell Mobley; Jason Sellers; Neil Thrasher
- Producers: Mark Bright; Reba McEntire

Reba singles chronology
"Cowgirls Don't Cry" (2008)	"Strange" (2009)	"Consider Me Gone" (2009)

"Strange" is a song written by Wendell Mobley, Jason Sellers and Neil Thrasher, and recorded by American country music artist Reba McEntire as her first release for the Valory label, a sister label of Big Machine Records. McEntire debuted the song on the Academy of Country Music awards the week before its release to country radio. It is the first single from her twenty-fifth studio album, Keep On Loving You, released on August 18, 2009.

== Content ==
"Strange" is a moderate up-tempo in which the narrator says that she has just ended a relationship, and that she finds it "strange" that she is not upset over its ending. McEntire described the song as "tongue-in-cheek. It's a little bit about, you know, 'I'm supposed to be in love with this guy and really heartbroken, but I'm not.' So, it's a tough-woman song."

== Critical reception ==
Matt Bjorke of Roughstock gave the song a favorable review, saying that McEntire sang the song strongly, and by doing so, sounded "renewed, refreshed and ready to conquer the charts once again." Billboard also gave the song a positive review, with critic Deborah Evans Price saying McEntire delivers "the ultimate sassy anthem about a woman's resilience" and calling it a "delicious performance from one of country music's most gifted divas." Entertainment Weekly called the song the best on the album, by saying "Reba McEntire leads off her 31st album with 'Strange', an addictively sinister kiss-off that the next 12 tracks struggle to match".

== Music video ==
A music video, directed by Trey Fanjoy, premiered on CMT on May 28, 2009. In the video, McEntire is shown in bed, surrounded by used tissues and chocolates while she talks on the phone. Later, she is shown looking through a rack of strapless black dresses. Throughout the video, scenes of her performing with her band and in front of a kaleidoscope background are included. This is also the first music video in which her road band appears. It is also her first music video where she's credited as just Reba.

== Chart performance ==
"Strange" was released to radio on April 6, 2009, one day after McEntire performed the song on the Academy of Country Music awards show. On the Billboard Hot Country Songs chart dated for April 25, 2009, the song debuted at number 39, the highest solo chart debut of her career.

Chart (2009)	Peak position
US Hot Country Songs (Billboard)	11
US Billboard Hot 100	76
Canada Hot 100 (Billboard)	92

=== Year-end charts ===
Chart (2009)	Position
US Country Songs (Billboard)	53
