= Love Somebody (album) =

Studio album by Reba McEntire
- Released: April 14, 2015
- Studios: Starstruck Studios and Blackbird Studio (Nashville, Tennessee); Mix LA (Los Angeles, California)
- Genre: Country
- Length: 44:13
- Labels: Nash Icon; Starstruck
- Producers: Tony Brown; Reba McEntire; Doug Sisemore; James Stroud

Reba McEntire chronology
All the Women I Am (2010)	Love Somebody (2015)	My Kind of Christmas (2016)

Singles from Love Somebody
- 1. "Going Out Like That" Released: January 6, 2015; 2. "Until They Don't Love You" Released: August 7, 2015; 3. "Just Like Them Horses" Released: January 19, 2016

Love Somebody is the twenty-ninth studio album from American country music singer Reba McEntire. It was released on April 14, 2015, by Nash Icon. This is McEntire's first studio album since the 2010 release of All the Women I Am. "Going Out Like That" was released as the album's first single on January 6, 2015, and it has charted within the top 30 of Country Airplay. McEntire produced the album with Tony Brown, James Stroud, and Doug Sisemore. The album has also been released on LP.

== Background ==
In October 2014, when it was announced that McEntire had signed with Nash Icon, it was revealed that McEntire had begun working a new album. Eleven tracks had already been produced. When the album's first single "Going Out Like That" debuted on the Hot Country Songs chart, it was said that the album would be released in April 2015. On February 13, 2015, the album's release date, title and track listing were announced. McEntire's wrote on her website, "We've been working on it a long time and we can't wait to hear what you think about it. As you all know, I love looking for songs to record. I've said that many times. Getting to work again with Allison Jones over at Nash Icon Records (part of the Big Machine Label group) was a blast! We listened to thousands of songs to find just the right ones for this album. The album has 12 songs and there will be a Target exclusive version with two extra tracks." The album will also be available on vinyl LP through McEntire's web page. Over 25,000 copies of the album were pre-ordered before the actual release date.

In October 2016, the LP was made available in store at Cracker Barrel locations across the country in special promotion with her new Christmas CD.

== Commercial performance ==
Love Somebody debuted at number one on the Billboard Top Country Albums chart, her twelfth number one album on the chart, and number three on the US Billboard 200, selling 62,469 copies in the US. The album has sold 307,800 copies in the US as of March 2018. This is McEntire's fifteenth album to achieve a #1 chart slot.

== Track listing ==
Love Somebody – Standard edition
No.	Title	Writer(s)	Producer(s)	Length
1.	"Going Out Like That"	Rhett Akins; Ben Hayslip; Jason Sellers	Reba McEntire; Tony Brown	3:42
2.	"Enough" (featuring Jennifer Nettles)	Kelly Archer; Aaron Scherz; Emily Shackleton	McEntire; James Stroud	4:07
3.	"She Got Drunk Last Night"	Brandy Clark; Shane McAnally	McEntire; Brown	3:03
4.	"Livin' Ain't Killed Me Yet"	Tommy Lee James; Laura Veltz	McEntire; Brown	3:01
5.	"That’s When I Knew"	Jim Collins; Ashley Gorley	McEnitre; Stroud	4:03
6.	"I'll Go On"	James; Ella Mae Bowen	McEntire; Stroud	3:32
7.	"Until They Don't Love You"	McAnally; Lori McKenna; Josh Osborne	McEntire; Brown	3:06
8.	"Promise Me Love"	Nicole Fernandez; Jason Miller; Susan Ruth	McEntire; Brown	4:07
9.	"Just Like Them Horses"	James; Liz Hengber	McEntire; Brown	4:30
10.	"Love Somebody"	McAnally; Osborne; Sam Hunt	McEntire; Brown	3:15
11.	"Love Land"	Tom Douglas; Rachel Thibodeau	McEntire; Brown	3:58
12.	"Pray for Peace"	Reba McEntire	McEntire; Doug Sisemore	3:49

Love Somebody – Target / International deluxe edition
No.	Title	Writer(s)	Producer(s)	Length
13.	"Whatever Way It Hurts the Least"	Clark; James; Osborne	McEntire; Stroud	3:15
14.	"More Than Just Her Last Name"	Clark; McAnally; Osborne	McEntire; Brown	3:44

- "Pray for Peace" was not included in the LP version of the album.

== Personnel ==
Adapted from the liner notes.

Musicians

- Reba McEntire – lead vocals
- Jennifer Nettles – lead vocals (2)
- Gordon Mote – acoustic piano, keyboards
- Steve Nathan – acoustic piano, keyboards, synthesizers, Hammond B3 organ
- Jimmy Nichols – keyboards
- Doug Sisemore – keyboards, programming, acoustic guitar, electric guitar, percussion
- Ilya Toshinsky – acoustic guitar, electric guitar, banjo, bouzouki
- Biff Watson – acoustic guitar
- Kenny Greenberg – electric guitar
- Brent Mason – electric guitar
- Paul Franklin – steel guitar
- Aubrey Haynie – fiddle, mandolin
- Jimmy Mattingly – fiddle, mandolin
- Mike Brignardello – bass
- Mark Hill – bass
- Michael Rhodes – bass
- Tommy Harden – drums, percussion
- Greg Morrow – drums, percussion, programming
- Lonnie Wilson – drums
- Jay Dawson – bagpipes
- Ethan Mattingly – French horn
- Jonathan Yudkin – cello

Background vocals

- Bob Bailey
- Kelly Clarkson
- Perry Coleman
- Ronnie Dunn
- Reba McEntire
- Kim Fleming
- Vicki Hampton
- Tania Hancheroff
- Tommy Harden
- Wes Hightower
- Caroline Kole
- Gary Oliver
- Doug Sisemore
- Jenifer Wrinkle

Choir

- Gary Oliver – choir director
- Shawnel Corley
- Shawn Davis
- Melinda Doolittle
- Hope Loftis
- Gale Mayes
- Kimberly Mont
- Royce Mosley
- Angela Primm
- Debi Selby

=== Production ===
- Allison Jones – A&R
- Reba McEntire – producer
- Tony Brown – producer (1, 3, 4, 7–11, 14)
- James Stroud – producer (2, 5, 6, 13)
- Doug Sisemore – producer (12)
- Amy Garges – production coordinator (1, 3, 4, 7–11, 14)
- Tammy Luker – production coordinator (2, 5, 6, 13)
- Doug Rich – production coordinator (2, 5, 6, 13)
- Justin McIntosh – art direction, graphic design
- Sandi Spika Borchetta – art direction
- Jeremy Cowart – photography
- Terry Gordon – wardrobe
- Brett Freedman – hair, make-up

Technical credits

- Andrew Mendelson – mastering at Georgetown Masters (Nashville, Tennessee)
- Natthaphol Abhigantaphand – mastering assistant
- Andrew Darby – mastering assistant
- Steve Dewey – mastering assistant
- Adam Grover – mastering assistant
- Chuck Ainlay – recording (1, 3, 4, 7–11), mixing (3, 6, 8, 11, 12)
- Chris Lord-Alge – mixing (1, 2, 4, 5, 7, 10)
- Julian King – recording (2, 5, 6)
- Derek Bason – mixing (9)
- Todd Tidwell – additional recording (1, 3, 4, 7, 8, 10), recording assistant (1–11), mix assistant (3, 6, 8, 11, 12), recording (12)
- Chris Ashburn – additional recording assistant (1, 3, 4, 7, 8, 10), recording assistant (2, 5, 6, 12)
- Shawn Daugherty – additional recording assistant (1, 3, 8, 10), recording assistant (12)
- Keith Armstrong – mix assistant (1, 2, 4, 5, 7, 10)
- Nik Karpen – mix assistant (1, 2, 4, 5, 7, 10)
- Sean Badum – recording assistant (4, 7)
- Zach Reynolds – mix assistant (8)
- Chris Small – mix assistant (9)

== Chart performance ==
=== Album ===
Weekly

Chart (2015)	Peak position
Australian Albums (ARIA)	51
Canadian Albums (Billboard)	6
UK Country Albums (Official Charts)	2
US Billboard 200	3
US Top Country Albums (Billboard)	1

Year-end

Chart (2015)	Position
US Billboard 200	193
US Top Country Albums (Billboard)	21

=== Singles ===
Single	Year	Peak chart positions				
Single	Year	US Country	US Country Airplay	US	CAN Country	CAN
"Going Out Like That"	2015	23	28	102	37	85
"Until They Don't Love You"	2015	—	48	—	—	—
"Just Like Them Horses"	2016	37	—	—	—	—
"—" denotes releases that did not chart

== Release history ==
List of release dates, showing region, label, format, edition(s) and catalog number
Region	Date	Label	Format(s)	Edition(s)
United States	April 14, 2015	Nash Icon	CD; digital download; LP	Standard; Target Edition
