= Going Out Like That =

Single by Reba

from the album Love Somebody
- Released: January 6, 2015
- Recorded: 2014
- Genre: Country
- Length: 3:42
- Label: Nash Icon
- Songwriter(s): Rhett Akins; Ben Hayslip; Jason Sellers
- Producer(s): Tony Brown

Reba singles chronology
| "Somebody's Chelsea" (2011) | "Going Out Like That" (2015) | "Until They Don't Love You" (2015) |

"Going Out Like That" is a song recorded by American country music singer Reba McEntire for her twenty-seventh studio album, Love Somebody, which was released on April 14, 2015. It was released on January 6, 2015, as the lead single. "Going Out Like That" is McEntire's first single for Nash Icon as well as her first single since "Somebody's Chelsea" in 2011. The song was written by Rhett Akins, Ben Hayslip and Jason Sellers, and produced by Tony Brown.

== History ==
The song was originally recorded by Love and Theft for an album on RCA Records Nashville which was never released.

== Critical reception ==
Reviews have been positive for "Going Out Like That". One Stop Country states, “While ‘Going Out Like That’ carries a familiarity with it that recalls one of Reba’s own recent hits “Turn On The Radio,” the third person perspective on this song adds a different element and depth to it that makes this relatable to today’s younger country listening audience, while still being 100% Reba.” Country Music Chat also gave the single a positive review, "Reba’s first single since 2011’s trifecta off All the Woman I Am, “Going Out Like That” serves as an anthem of self-assurance, courageousness, and healing for anybody hurting due to love lost. With relatable lyrics, a catchy melody, and Reba’s uniquely identifiable and legendary vocals, this new single should have a hand in swaying the country music pendulum back toward gender neutral ground." Country Weekly gave the song an "A" stating, "The song rocks, with the drumming especially prominent and notable, but it never overwhelms your senses. This deserves to be all over radio, and we’re sure it will be."

== Music video ==
The music video was directed by TK McKamy and premiered in March 2015.

== Chart performance ==
Upon being released on iTunes, the song shot to number one on the Country iTunes Charts. The song debuted on the Hot Country Songs chart at number 28, and on the Country Digital Songs chart at number 13, selling 21,000 copies in its first week. The song has sold 207,000 copies in the US as of July 22, 2015.

| Chart (2015) | Peak position |
|---|---|
| Canada (Canadian Hot 100) | 85 |
| Canada Country (Billboard) | 37 |
| US Bubbling Under Hot 100 (Billboard) | 2 |
| US Country Airplay (Billboard) | 28 |
| US Hot Country Songs (Billboard) | 23 |

=== Year-end charts ===
| Chart (2015) | Position |
|---|---|
| US Country Airplay (Billboard) | 82 |
| US Hot Country Songs (Billboard) | 80 |

== Certifications ==
Certifications for Going Out Like That
| Region | Certification | Certified units/sales |
|---|---|---|
| United States (RIAA) | Gold | 500,000^{‡} |
^{‡} Sales+streaming figures based on certification alone.
