= When Love Gets a Hold of You =

Single by Reba

from the album All the Women I Am
- Released: April 11, 2011
- Recorded: 2010
- Genre: Country
- Length: 3:34
- Label: Starstruck/Valory
- Songwriter(s): Jessi Alexander; Gary Nicholson; Jon Randall
- Producer(s): Dann Huff

Reba singles chronology
"If I Were a Boy" (2011)	"When Love Gets a Hold of You" (2011)	"Somebody's Chelsea" (2011)

"When Love Gets a Hold of You" is a song written by Jon Randall, Jessi Alexander and Gary Nicholson, and recorded by American country music singer Reba McEntire. It was released in April 2011 as the third single from her album All the Women I Am.

== Critical reception ==
The song has received positive reviews from critics. Blake Boldt from Engine 145 gave the song a "thumbs up," saying the "spaghetti Western-meets-Pulp Fiction vibe, will likely stand out in the crowd of loud summertime anthems" and calling the song "a solid base hit for the Hall of Famer." Bobby Peacock from Roughstock gave the song 4 out of 5 stars, calling it "unmistakably Reba and unmistakably a hit," and telling fans to "look for this one to bring (Reba) back into the single digits once more."

== Promotion ==
McEntire performed the song on the 46th Academy of Country Music Awards, after which she received a long standing ovation from the crowd. McEntire was also hosting the awards show with Blake Shelton. This performance is used as the song's music video.

== Chart performance ==
Chart (2011)	Peak position
Canada Country (Billboard)	45
US Hot Country Songs (Billboard)	40
