= Keep On Loving You (album) =

Studio album by Reba McEntire
- Released: August 18, 2009
- Recorded: 2009
- Studio: Starstruck Studios (Nashville, Tennessee)
- Genre: Country
- Length: 48:28
- Label: Starstruck/Valory
- Producers: Tony Brown; Mark Bright; Reba McEntire

Reba McEntire chronology
50 Greatest Hits (2008)	Keep On Loving You (2009)	All the Women I Am (2010)

Singles from Keep on Loving You
- 1. "Strange" Released: April 6, 2009; 2. "Consider Me Gone" Released: August 10, 2009; 3. "I Keep On Loving You" Released: February 1, 2010

Keep On Loving You is the twenty-seventh studio album by American country music singer Reba McEntire. It was released on August 18, 2009 on Starstruck/Valory and on Humphead Records in the UK, and was produced by Tony Brown, Mark Bright, and McEntire.

Keep On Loving You was McEntire's first solo studio album in six years, since the release of 2003's Room to Breathe, and her first for the Valory label (in conjunction with her company, Starstruck Entertainment). In 2008, she exited her label of twenty-five years, MCA Nashville, after the release of Reba: Duets (2007).

The album contains "Strange," is the highest-debuting single of McEntire's career, as well as the hit single "Consider Me Gone," McEntire's first number-one hit since "Somebody" in August 2004. The song went on to become the biggest hit of her career, topping the charts for four weeks. The album's third single, the Ronnie Dunn co-written title track, was released in February 2010 and has become a top ten hit on the country charts.

Despite changing labels, McEntire remains with Universal Music Group (which controls her entire catalog including her Mercury Nashville years), as Valory's parent label, Big Machine Records, is distributed by Universal.

== Background ==
Keep On Loving You was recorded in Nashville, Tennessee in early 2009, and consists of thirteen tracks. The eighth track, "She's Turning 50 Today", was co-written by McEntire, as well as Liz Hengber and Tommy Lee James. Many of the album's songs had previously been recorded by other country music artists. "I Want a Cowboy" was originally recorded by Katrina Elam on her self-titled debut album, and "Pink Guitar" was recorded by Jasmine Rae on her debut album, Look It Up. "Eight Crazy Hours" was recorded by Shelly Fairchild on her debut album, Ride, and "Nothing to Lose" was recorded by Trisha Yearwood in 2007 on her Greatest Hits release. The title track was later recorded by co-writer Ronnie Dunn on the Cracker Barrel edition of his self-titled debut album in 2012.

== Critical reception ==
Professional ratings
Review scores
Source	Rating
AllMusic	3/5 stars
Slant Magazine	3/5 stars
Los Angeles Times	(Positive)
Entertainment Weekly	(B−)
The New York Times	(Positive)
The Boston Globe	(Positive)

Thom Jurek of AllMusic praised the album's production, saying, "Despite its release on an indie, the production and approach are anything but, with the album being produced by Tony Brown and Mark Bright. The cream of country music's current chart crop wrote its 13 songs; it is certainly a radio-friendly collection that is supposed to showcase McEntire's adaptability and that she's still "got it," and can still score in the contemporary marketplace." He also found Keep On Loving You to be radio-friendly, calling the title track, "I'll Keep on Lovin' You", "a midtempo ballad that is saturated in compressed guitars and Hammond B-3, big repetitive choruses, and a chorus of fiddles and backing vocals. McEntire's voice hasn't lost even a touch of its range and power; she's a belter who can hang with the best of them." He felt the opening track, "Strange", followed the same format. He gave Keep On Loving You three out of five stars. In concluding his review, Jurek said; "The bottom line here is that Keep on Loving You may jar some longtime Reba fans on first listen, but despite the record's sound it's all her in this mix, and they will more than likely celebrate this. As far as the new fans this set clearly hopes to gain, it's got the right elements; if country music's finicky youth-obsessed radio and video machine can hear this set for what it is, listeners will connect in droves."

Bobby Peacock of Roughstock also gave a generally positive review, saying that some songs such as "Consider Me Gone", the second single, recalled McEntire's early-1990s work. He criticized the lyrics and "sometimes-sterile production" of some songs, but added, "Despite the flaws, the album has more than enough redeeming qualities, and with any luck, the right single choices should reverse the long, slow decline that her musical career has been on since the beginning of the decade, and prove that age should not be a factor in an artist's success."

Whitney Pastorek of Entertainment Weekly gave Keep On Loving You a "B−" rating, stating, "Though her voice has aged well, few of these tunes provide it enough of a challenge, and the ones that do often sound like something she's already done better."

== Commercial performance ==
The album's lead single, "Strange", was released on April 6, 2009 to radio, and was first performed at the Academy of Country Music Awards a few days before. The song became McEntire's highest-debuting single of her career, debuting at #39 on the Billboard Hot Country Songs chart. Within a week, the song rose eleven spaces to #28, eventually peaking at #11 on the chart by summer 2009, while also reaching #10 on the Mediabase country chart around the same time.

McEntire released the album's second single, "Consider Me Gone," to radio on the day of the album's official release.

Keep On Loving You was released on August 18, 2009, becoming McEntire's second album to debut at #1 on both the Billboard Top Country Albums and Billboard 200 charts, with 96,000 copies sold in its first week. This is lower than the 300,000 first-week sales for her album Reba: Duets. With the release, McEntire currently holds the record for being the female country artist with the most Billboard #1 albums. This record had previously been held by Loretta Lynn. The album was certified Gold by the Recording Industry Association of America.

Worldwide, the album was fairly successful, peaking at #16 on the ARIA, #5 on the UK Country Album Charts, and #98 on the Japan Oricon Top 100.

== Track listing ==
No.	Title	Writer(s)	Length
1.	"Strange"	Wendell Mobley, Jason Sellers, Neil Thrasher	3:00
2.	"Just When I Thought I'd Stopped Lovin' You"	Mark Nesler, Rivers Rutherford	3:50
3.	"I Keep On Loving You"	Ronnie Dunn, Terry McBride	3:13
4.	"I Want a Cowboy"	David Davidson, Katrina Elam, Wayne Kirkpatrick, Jimmie Lee Sloas	3:39
5.	"Consider Me Gone"	Steve Diamond, Marv Green	3:38
6.	"But Why"	Sellers, Thrasher	3:28
7.	"Pink Guitar"	Jamie O'Neal, Ed Hill, Shaye Smith	2:53
8.	"She's Turning 50 Today"	Liz Hengber, Tommy Lee James, Reba McEntire	4:05
9.	"Eight Crazy Hours (In the Story of Love)"	Leslie Satcher, Darrell Scott	4:04
10.	"Nothing to Lose"	Kim Fox	4:47
11.	"Over You"	Michael Dulaney, Steven Dale Jones, Sellers	3:56
12.	"Maggie Creek Road"	Karyn Rochelle, James T. Slater	4:50
13.	"I'll Have What She's Having"	Jimmy Melton, Georgia Middleman	2:59

Enhanced content
No.	Title	Writer(s)	Length
1.	"Strange" (music video)	Mobley, Sellers, Thrasher	2:57
2.	"Consider Me Gone" (CMT Invitation Only Live Performance)	Diamond, Green	3:38

Rhapsody bonus track
No.	Title	Writer(s)	Length
1.	"I Want a Cowboy" (Dance remix)	Elam, Davidson, Kirkpatrick, Sloas	3:49

Target exclusive DVD
No.	Title	Length
1.	"Strange" (making of the music video)	22:27
2.	"Strangest "Strange" Questions"	5:00
3.	"Reba, Day of Stardom Behind the Scenes!"	4:00

== Personnel ==
=== Musicians ===
- Reba McEntire – lead vocals
- Charlie Judge – keyboards (1, 2, 5, 7–9, 11), strings (9)
- Gordon Mote – acoustic piano (1, 2, 5, 7–9, 11)
- Steve Nathan – Hammond B3 organ (3, 4, 12), acoustic piano (6, 12), keyboards (6, 12)
- Matt Rollings – acoustic piano (3, 4, 10, 12, 13), Hammond B3 organ (6)
- Tom Bukovac – electric guitar (1, 2, 5, 7–9, 11)
- Ilya Toshinsky – acoustic guitar (1, 2, 5, 7–9, 11), banjo (1)
- Brent Mason – electric guitar (3, 4, 6, 10, 12, 13)
- Bryan Sutton – acoustic guitar (3, 6, 10, 12, 13), banjo (4, 10)
- Kenny Greenberg – electric guitar (5–7, 10)
- Mike Johnson – steel guitar (1, 2, 5, 7–9, 11), dobro (9)
- Paul Franklin – steel guitar (3, 4, 6, 10, 13), dobro (12)
- Aubrey Haynie – fiddle (1, 3–8, 10, 12, 13), mandolin (1, 9, 10)
- Jimmie Lee Sloas – bass (1, 2, 5, 7–9, 11), acoustic guitar (4)
- Glenn Worf – bass (3, 4, 6, 10, 12, 13)
- Shannon Forrest – drums (1, 2, 5, 7–9, 11)
- Eddie Bayers – drums (3, 4, 6, 10, 12, 13)
- Wes Hightower – backing vocals (1–5, 7, 8, 10, 12)
- Jenifer Wrinkle – backing vocals (1, 2, 4, 5, 7, 8, 10, 12, 13)
- Ashley Cleveland – backing vocals (3)
- Perry Coleman – backing vocals (3)
- Kim Keyes – backing vocals (3)
- Judson Spence – backing vocals (3)
- Katrina Elam – backing vocals (4)
- Wayne Kirkpatrick – backing vocals (4)
- Jason Sellers – backing vocals (6)

=== Production ===
- Reba McEntire – producer
- Mark Bright – producer (1, 2, 5, 7–9, 11)
- Tony Brown – producer (3, 4, 6, 10, 12, 13)
- Derek Bason – recording, mixing
- Chris Ashburn – assistant engineer
- Tristan Brock-Jones – assistant engineer
- Nathan Dickinson – digital editing (1, 2, 5, 7–9, 11)
- Steve Marcantionio – additional engineer (3, 4, 6, 10, 12, 13)
- Todd Tidwell – additional engineer (3, 4, 6, 10, 12, 13)
- Hank Williams – mastering at MasterMix (Nashville, Tennessee)
- Mike "Frog" Griffith – production coordinator (1, 2, 5, 7–9, 11)
- Kirsten Wines – production assistant (1, 2, 5, 7–9, 11)
- Erin McAnally – production coordinator (3, 4, 6, 10, 12, 13)
- Whitney Sutton – copy coordination
- Sandi Spika Borchetta – creative direction
- LeeAnn Ramey – package design
- Russ Harrington – photography
- Terry Gordon – stylist
- Brett Freedman – hair, make-up

Enhanced content

- Trey Fanjoy – music video director ("Strange")
- Todd Cassetty – content menu design, director (The making of the video "Strange")
- Paul Cain – editor (The making of the video "Strange")
- Justin Nolan Key – editor (Reba: Behind The Scenes)

== Charts and certifications ==
=== Weekly charts ===
Chart (2009)	Peak position
Australian Albums (ARIA)	174
Canadian Albums (Billboard)	5
UK Country Albums (Official Charts)	2
US Billboard 200	1
US Top Country Albums (Billboard)	1

=== Year-end charts ===
Chart (2009)	Position
US Billboard 200	115
US Top Country Albums (Billboard)	24
Chart (2010)	Position
US Billboard 200	142
US Top Country Albums (Billboard)	24

=== Singles ===
Year	Song	Chart positions		
Year	Song	US Country	US	CAN
2009	"Strange"	11	76	94
2009	"Consider Me Gone"	1	38	52
2010	"I Keep On Loving You"	7	78	97

== Release history ==
Country	Date
United States	August 18, 2009
Canada	August 18, 2009
Australia	August 20, 2009
United Kingdom	August 31, 2009
Japan	August 31, 2009
