= Somebody's Chelsea =

Single by Reba

from the album All the Women I Am
- Released: August 29, 2011
- Genre: Country
- Length: 4:33
- Label: Valory/Starstruck
- Songwriters: Reba McEntire; Liz Hengber; Will Robinson
- Producer: Dann Huff

Reba singles chronology
"When Love Gets a Hold of You" (2011)	"Somebody's Chelsea" (2011)	"Going Out Like That" (2015)

"Somebody's Chelsea" is a song co-written and recorded by American country music singer Reba McEntire. It is the fourth single from her 2010 album All the Women I Am.

== Content ==
McEntire told Taste of Country that the inspiration for the song came from a line of dialogue in the film P.S. I Love You, in which Hilary Swank's character describes her loving, deceased husband named Gerry to Harry Connick, Jr.'s character, and Connick's character says that he "wants to be somebody's Gerry". McEntire then e-mailed the idea to songwriter Liz Hengber. The song is the first time since "Only in My Mind" in 1985 that McEntire co-wrote one of her own singles.

The song focuses on the narrator, who converses with an elderly man (played by Ed Asner in the music video) on an airplane. The man then tells her of how much he loved his wife, Chelsea, who has died. In the chorus, the narrator sings that she "wants to be somebody's Chelsea." McEntire chose the name Chelsea because it is her granddaughter's name.

== Critical reception ==
Thom Jurek of Allmusic thought that the song was "more natural-sounding balladry" in comparison to the rest of the album, which he called "contrived". It received a five-star rating from Bobby Peacock of Roughstock, who said, "Underneath a radio-friendly, slick exterior, the song reveals a powerful, moving story." Andrew Greenhalgh of Country Standard Time wrote that the song "is out for tears".

== Chart performance ==
Chart (2011)	Peak position
US Hot Country Songs (Billboard)	44
