= BC Jean =

- Born: Brittany Jean Carlson; April 22, 1987 (age 39)
- Origin: San Diego, California, U.S.
- Genres: Pop rock, soul, dance-pop, Europop
- Years active: 2005–present
- Label: J Records (formerly)
- Spouse: Mark Ballas (m. 2016)

Brittany Jean Carlson (born April 22, 1987), better known by her stage name BC Jean, is an American singer-songwriter, best known for writing and singing the song "If I Were a Boy", later recorded by Beyoncé.

== Early life ==
Jean was born in Mercy Hospital, San Diego to mother Lori Carlson, a talent manager, and a stockbroker father who played trumpet and piano. She has lived in Ramona, Valley Center, and Carmel Valley, California. She plays piano and began songwriting at 14 inspired by the works of performers including Queen, Rod Stewart, and Aerosmith. Jean later became part of a cover band in high school. Her first performance with the band was at the Sahara Casino on the Las Vegas Strip when she was 15.

== Musical career ==
Jean was signed to J Records while working on a debut album with Dallas Austin, The Matrix, Max Martin and others. After signing with J, Clive Davis, the CEO of Sony Music Entertainment said, "You eagerly wait for a multi-talented new artist to come along like BC Jean. We're all really delighted that BC has chosen us as her musical home." It was later announced on October 7, 2011, that the RCA Music Group was disbanding a dozen labels including J Records. All of the artists from those labels, including Jean would move and release future material through RCA Records.

Jean released her debut single, "Just a Guy", on September 14, 2010. She also starred in the web-series Talent produced by Alloy TV on YouTube as Harper, a musician who travels to Los Angeles in search of fame. Two seasons have aired.

=== Alexander Jean ===
Alexander Jean is a duo with BC Jean & Mark Ballas. They began performing as a pop rock duo in 2015. Their debut single was "Roses and Violets", which reached the Top 20 on Billboard's Hot 100 "Bubbling Under" chart. They had success with "Waiting for You" and were nominated to be Elvis Duran's Artist of the Month in November 2018.

== Personal life ==
Jean currently lives in Los Angeles. Her grandparents, who were also music artists, were signed to RCA Records for more than 30 years. Her grandfather performed with Perry Como and both grandparents with Fred Waring. Since 2012, she has been in a relationship with Dancing with the Stars professional dancer Mark Ballas. They were engaged on November 25, 2015. Exactly a year later, on November 25, 2016, the couple married in Malibu, California. They welcomed a son on November 5, 2023.

== Discography ==
(For discography as part of duo with Mark Ballas, see Alexander Jean)

=== Singles ===
- "If I Were A Boy" (2009) by Beyoncé
- "Just a Guy" (2010) by BC Jean
- "Are You Ready" (2010) by Miley Cyrus as Hannah Montana
- "Que Será" (2010) by Miley Cyrus as Hannah Montana
- "Stamp of Love" (2010) by Jessica Lowdnes
- "If I Were A Boy" (2010) by Reba McEntire
- "Love Me Love Body” (2010) Hitomi - Japan
- "I'll Survive You" (2011) by BC Jean
- "Anyone" (2011) by BC Jean
- "Put Your Hearts Up" (2011) by Ariana Grande
- "Naked" (2011) by Kimberly Caldwell
- "Desperate Girls & Stupid Guys" (2011) by Kimberly Caldwell
- "Stand Up" (2011) by BC Jean
- "Outlaws of Love" (2012) by Adam Lambert
- "Don’t Dumb Me Down" (2012) by Mika Newton, UK

Featured Songs:

- "Stop Draggin' My Heart Around" (2011) (with Puddle of Mudd)
- "Not My Revolution" (2014) (with Itch)
- "Happy Holidaze" (2014) (with Astro Safari USA)
- "Torn In Two" (2012) (with It Boys!)
