= Consider Me Gone =

Single by Reba

from the album Keep On Loving You
- Released: July 29, 2009
- Genre: Country
- Length: 3:38
- Label: Starstruck Records/Valory Music Co.
- Songwriters: Steve Diamond; Marv Green
- Producers: Mark Bright; Reba McEntire

Reba singles chronology
"Strange" (2009)	"Consider Me Gone" (2009)	"I Keep On Loving You" (2010)

"Consider Me Gone" is a song written by Steve Diamond and Marv Green. It was recorded by American country music artist Reba McEntire as her second release for the Valory label, a sister label of Big Machine Records. It is also the second single from her twenty-seventh studio album Keep On Loving You, which was released on August 18, 2009. On the Billboard country singles charts dated for the week of January 2, 2010, the song became McEntire's twenty-fourth number-one single. It is also her longest-lasting number one at four weeks.

An acoustic version of the song was released ahead of McEntire's 2021 album Reba: Revived, Remixed, Revisited.

== Content ==
"Consider Me Gone" is a moderate up-tempo, featuring electric guitar and steel guitar fills, and fiddle. The narrator describes her lover as not being satisfied with her, but she decides to carry on without him and tells him to "consider [her] gone."

== Critical reception ==
Jim Malec of "The 9513" gave the song a thumbs-down, saying that it "is a perfectly fine tune, unobjectionable but seemingly a better fit for a new artist who perhaps doesn’t have access to Music City’s best material. Reba, of course, could have the pick of the litter."

Bobby Peacock, in his review of the album for Roughstock, compared the song's sound to McEntire's 1990s material, describing it as "an easy-going mid-tempo which focuses on the tail end of a fading relationship. The melody and production are a bit more stripped-down than most mainstream country radio, so this should do well as the second single."

== Music video ==
The music video was directed by Trey Fanjoy. It was a 2010 nominee for the CMT Music Awards' Female Video of the Year.

The video depicts Reba as a fashion designer working in a studio one night, while another woman is seen getting ready to go out. As she sings the song while working and on a spiral staircase, a storyline is interwoven, which depicts the woman and her husband having an argument. She seems to have had enough of his laziness (as he is on his phone watching TV and clearly not paying attention to her), and walks out on him. He seems to not be able to get over her leaving, and everything belonging to her disappears before his eyes, including her face in pictures of the two of them.

As this is going on, the woman is seen driving through the city in a convertible. She arrives at Reba's studio, and tells her that she has broken up, sobbing. The man knocks and comes in, embarrassing the woman in disbelief. He apologizes to her, and they make up and leave together. Reba walks them out, then turns out the lights to her shop and goes to look at a new dress she made.

== Chart performance ==
"Consider Me Gone" debuted at number 51 on the U.S. Billboard Hot Country Songs chart for the week of August 22, 2009. It was McEntire's 58th Top 10 hit and her first solo Top 10 since "He Gets That From Me" in 2005. It became her 24th number-one hit on the chart in the week of January 2, 2010 and her first number one in the United States since "Somebody" in August 2004. It also debuted at number 96 on the Billboard Hot 100 on the week ending October 17, 2009 and peaked at number 38, becoming her third top 40 hit on that chart. The song has become McEntire's longest-running number-one single, with four weeks at number one on the Billboard Hot Country Songs chart.

Chart (2009–2010)	Peak position
Canada Hot 100 (Billboard)	52
Canada Country (Billboard)	1
US Billboard Hot 100	38
US Hot Country Songs (Billboard)	1

=== Year-end charts ===
Chart (2010)	Position
US Country Songs (Billboard)	42

== Certifications ==
Region	Certification	Certified units/sales
United States (RIAA)	Platinum	1,000,000^{‡}
^{‡} Sales+streaming figures based on certification alone.
