= I Keep On Loving You =

Single by Reba

from the album Keep On Loving You
- Released: February 1, 2010
- Genre: Country
- Length: 3:13
- Label: Starstruck/Valory
- Songwriter(s): Ronnie Dunn, Terry McBride
- Producer(s): Tony Brown, Reba McEntire

Reba singles chronology
"Consider Me Gone" (2009)	"I Keep On Loving You" (2010)	"Turn On the Radio" (2010)

"I Keep On Loving You" is a song recorded by American country music singer Reba McEntire. Written by Ronnie Dunn and Terry McBride, it is the third single from McEntire's studio album Keep On Loving You. The song was released to radio in February 2010 as her eighty-fourth chart single.

== History ==
"I Keep On Loving You" was written by Ronnie Dunn of Brooks & Dunn, along with his frequent co-writing partner, former McBride & the Ride lead singer Terry McBride. In the song, the female narrator expresses patience with her partner after he has made mistakes, telling him that she "keep[s] on loving" him.

McEntire told The Boot that she identified with the song because of her long marriage to her manager, Narvel Blackstock, as well as Dunn's long marriage to his wife, Janine: "We have been through rough times and tough times and arguments, but we made up over and over again." Reba also performed this song on the Faith Hill special: Home for the Holidays, for people giving their love to tell their adopted kids to show how much they mean to them.

She performed the song at the 2010 ACM Awards. Dunn recorded his version of the song for the Cracker Barrel edition of his self-titled debut album in 2012.

== Music video ==
The music video was directed by Michael Salomon and premiered on CMT & GAC in March 2010. Mostly shot in black-and-white plus color shots of Reba singing, the video depicts a young bride and groom's wedding. She also portrays the bride's aunt. The bride's parents are played by Christian LeBlanc and Tracey E. Bregman (Michael and Lauren Baldwin from the CBS soap The Young & The Restless).

== Critical reception ==
The song has been met with generally favorable reviews. Mikael Wood and Randy Lewis of the Los Angeles Times thought that the song was an example of "mixed messages" on the album, saying that its theme of "patience and forgiveness for a partner who missteps time after time" was in contradiction to "Consider Me Gone."

Blake Boldt of Engine 145 gave the song a thumbs-up, saying that it "becomes something special on the strength of her performance." Bobby Peacock of Roughstock also commended McEntire's performance, but thought that the second verse was weakly written and that the song was overproduced.

== Chart performance ==
"I Keep On Loving You" debuted at number 57 on the U.S. Billboard Hot Country Songs chart for the week of February 6, 2010. It also debuted number 90 on the U.S. Billboard Hot 100 for the week of May 8, 2010, and at number 98 on the Canadian Hot 100 for the week of June 12, 2010. It entered the Top 10 on the Hot Country Songs chart for the week of June 19, 2010 becoming her 58th Top 10 hit on that chart, with a peak of number 7 on the chart dated July 3, 2010.

Chart (2010)	Peak position
Canada (Canadian Hot 100)	97
Canada Country (Billboard)	6
US Billboard Hot 100	78
US Hot Country Songs (Billboard)	7

=== Year-end charts ===
Chart (2010)	Position
US Country Songs (Billboard)	53
