= Nash Icon Records =

American record label

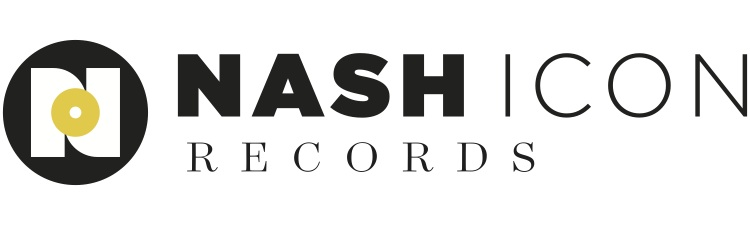
- Parent company: Big Machine Label Group
- Founded: May 13, 2014
- Genre: Country
- Country of origin: United States
- Location: Nashville, Tennessee
- Official website: Nash Icon Records

Nash Icon Records is an American country music record label established in 2014 by Big Machine Label Group and Cumulus Media. Nash Icon Records is located on Music Row in Nashville, Tennessee. The label launched with country music icon Reba McEntire.

== History ==
The idea for Nash Icon Records was forged between Scott Borchetta of Big Machine Label Group and John Dickey of Cumulus Media. On May 13, 2014, the record company was announced, and on June 18, 2014, Jim Weatherson was hired as the General Manager.

The label is a strategic partnership with Nash Icon, a spin-off of Nash FM owned by Cumulus Media, and was designed to feature well-known country artists from the last 25 years. It produces and distributes content for a wide range of country music fans.

Reba McEntire released her single "Going Out Like That" through the label on January 6, 2015. By March, it had broken into the Billboard Top 40 Country chart. On April 14, 2015, McEntire released her new studio album Love Somebody. It debuted at number 3 on the Billboard Top 200 and became the top-selling country album within a week.

On December 29, 2014, Martina McBride announced her signing. Ronnie Dunn signed with Nash Icon on January 12, 2015. In April 2015, Hank Williams, Jr. announced his signing.

== Discography ==
- Reba McEntire - Love Somebody (2015), Sing It Now: Songs of Faith & Hope (2017)
- Martina McBride - Reckless (2016)
- Ronnie Dunn - Tattooed Heart (2016)
- Hank Williams Jr. - It's About Time (2016)
