= David Cook discography =

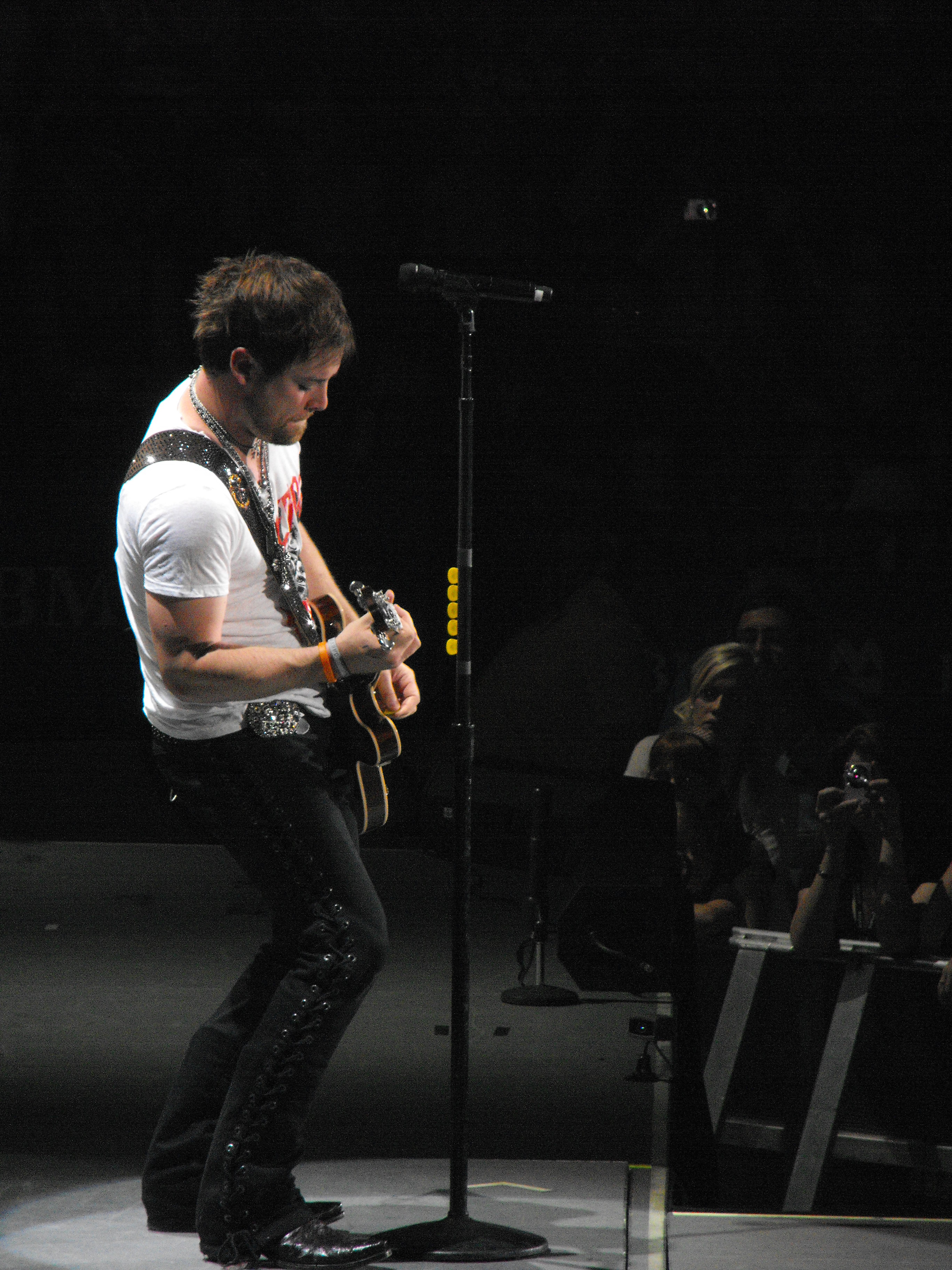
- Studio albums: 4
- Extended plays: 4
- Singles: 20
- Music videos: 8
- Other charted songs: 18

American singer David Cook has released four albums, 3 EPs, and 17 singles. Before appearing on American Idol, Cook self-released an album Analog Heart in 2006. During his run on the show, it was removed from sale. As of 2009, the album has sold fewer than 5,000 units in the United States.

He released his first single "The Time of My Life" after his win, followed by the lead single "Light On" from his first major-label album, the eponymous David Cook. Both "The Time of My Life" and "Light On" have each sold over a million copies, while his second single from the album "Come Back to Me" sold over 500,000. His self-titled album was released on November 18, 2008, via RCA Records. The album debuted at number three on the Billboard 200 chart, and was certified Platinum by the Recording Industry Association of America on January 22, 2009. The album was also certified Gold by the Canadian Recording Industry Association.

Cook's second major label album This Loud Morning was released on June 28, 2011, and debuted at number seven in the Billboard 200. The lead single from the album was "The Last Goodbye". His fourth studio album Digital Vein was released on September 18, 2015.

== Studio albums ==
Title	Details	Peak chart positions							Sales	Certifications
Title	Details	US	US Indie	US Rock	CAN	FIN	JPN	KOR	Sales	Certifications
Analog Heart	Release date: May 6, 2006; Label: self-released; Formats: CD	—	—	—	—	—	—	—	US: 1,800	
David Cook	Release date: November 18, 2008; Label: RCA Records/19; Formats: CD, music download	3	—	2	11	15	130	—	US: 1,500,000	RIAA: Platinum; MC: Gold
This Loud Morning	Release date: June 28, 2011; Label: RCA Records/19; Formats: CD, music download, vinyl	7	—	—	23	—	—	22		
Digital Vein	Release date: September 18, 2015; Label: Analog Heart Music; Formats: CD, music download, vinyl	35	8	—	—	—	—	—		
"—" denotes a record that failed to chart or was not released to that territory.

== Extended plays ==
List of EPs with relevant details
Title	Details	Peak chart positions		Sales
Title	Details	US	US Indie	Sales
This Quiet Night	Released: June 28, 2011; Label: RCA; Format: CD, digital download	—	—	US: 4,000
Chromance	Released: February 16, 2018; Label: Analog Heart Music; Formats: CD, digital download, vinyl	173	5	
The Looking Glass	Released: April 16, 2021; Label: Analog Heart Music; Format: CD, digital download, vinyl	—	—	
The Hero	Released: June 20, 2025; Label: Analog Heart Music; Format: CD	—	—	

== Singles ==
Year	Title	Peak chart positions										Certifications	Album
Year	Title	US	US AC	US Adult	US Pop	CAN	CAN AC	CAN HAC	FIN	NZ	UK	Certifications	Album
2008	"The Time of My Life"	3	1	7	28	2	5	23	10	29	61	RIAA: Platinum	Non-album single
2008	"Light On"	17	10	4	20	27	50	5	8	—	—	RIAA: Platinum	David Cook
2009	"Come Back to Me" / "Bar-ba-sol"	63 —	15 —	6 —	— —	— —	— —	39 —	— —	— —	— —		David Cook
2009	"Permanent" (Note: "Permanent" is also included on David Cook, but was released separately as a charity single.)	24	—	—	—	26	—	—	—	—	—		Charity single
2011	"The Last Goodbye"	— (Note: "The Last Goodbye" did not enter the Billboard Hot 100, but peaked at number 5 on the Bubbling Under Hot 100 Singles chart.)	17	29	—	—	—	—	—	—	—		This Loud Morning
2011	"Fade into Me"	—	—	33	—	—	—	—	—	—	—		This Loud Morning
2012	"The Last Song I'll Write for You" (Note: "The Last Song I'll Write for You" did not enter any formally-recognized Billboard chart, but did reach number 45 on the Billboard Pop Digital Songs chart.)	—	—	—	—	—	—	—	—	—	—		Non-album singles
2013	"Laying Me Low" (Note: "Laying Me Low" did not enter any formally-recognized Billboard chart, but did reach number 36 on the Billboard Pop Digital Songs chart.)	—	—	—	—	—	—	—	—	—	—		Non-album singles
2014	"Wait for Me"	—	—	—	—	—	—	—	—	—	—		Non-album singles
2015	"Criminals"	—	—	—	—	—	—	—	—	—	—		Digital Vein
2016	"Broken Windows"	—	—	—	—	—	—	—	—	—	—		Digital Vein
2016	"Heartbeat"	—	—	—	—	—	—	—	—	—	—		Digital Vein
2017	"Gimme Heartbreak"	—	—	—	—	—	—	—	—	—	—		Chromance
2018	"Death of Me"	—	—	—	—	—	—	—	—	—	—		Non-album single
2020	"Reds Turn Blue"	—	—	—	—	—	—	—	—	—	—		The Looking Glass
2020	"Strange World"	—	—	—	—	—	—	—	—	—	—		The Looking Glass
2021	"Fire"	—	—	—	—	—	—	—	—	—	—		The Looking Glass
2022	"TABOS"	—	—	—	—	—	—	—	—	—	—		Non-album single
2024	"Dead Weight"	—	—	—	—	—	—	—	—	—	—		The Hero
2024	"This Time Tomorrow 16"	—	—	—	—	—	—	—	—	—	—		Non-album single
"—" denotes releases that did not chart or were not released to that country.

== Other charted songs ==
Year	Title	Peak positions					Album
Year	Title	US	US Bub.	US Pop 100	US Digital	CAN	Album
2008	"Dream Big"	15	—	17	7	21	Non-album songs performed on American Idol
2008	"I Still Haven't Found What I'm Looking For" (Originally by U2)	22	—	24	9	17	Non-album songs performed on American Idol
2008	"The World I Know" (Originally by Collective Soul)	28	—	31	14	24	Non-album songs performed on American Idol
2008	"I Don't Want to Miss a Thing" (Originally by Aerosmith)	42	—	38	21	43	Non-album songs performed on American Idol
2008	"Shout to the Lord" (amongst American Idol Top 8)	43	—	—	15	57	Non-album songs performed on American Idol
2008	"Billie Jean" (Originally by Michael Jackson)	47	—	39	24	41	Non-album songs performed on American Idol
2008	"Always Be My Baby" (Originally by Mariah Carey)	67	—	46	29	59	Non-album songs performed on American Idol
2008	"Hello" (Originally by Lionel Richie)	73	—	48	32	57	Non-album songs performed on American Idol
2008	"The Music of the Night" (Song from The Phantom of the Opera)	77	—	54	41	73	Non-album songs performed on American Idol
2008	"Eleanor Rigby" (Originally by The Beatles)	92	—	62	51	83	Non-album songs performed on American Idol
2008	"I'm Alive" (Originally by Neil Diamond)	99	—	73	60	—	Non-album songs performed on American Idol
2008	"Little Sparrow" (Originally by Dolly Parton)	—	1	79	66	96	Non-album songs performed on American Idol
2008	"Hungry Like the Wolf" (Originally by Duran Duran)	—	3	81	68	—	Non-album songs performed on American Idol
2008	"Innocent" (Originally by Our Lady Peace)	—	4	82	69	—	Non-album songs performed on American Idol
2008	"Day Tripper" (Originally by The Beatles)	—	14	95	—	—	Non-album songs performed on American Idol
2008	"All Right Now" (Originally by Free)	—	18	—	—	—	Non-album songs performed on American Idol
2008	"Happy Together" (Originally by The Turtles)	—	25	—	—	—	Non-album songs performed on American Idol
2008	"Declaration"	—	13	—	75	—	David Cook
"—" denotes releases that did not chart or were not released to that country.

== Videography ==
=== Music videos ===
Year	Song	Director
2008	"Light On"	Wayne Isham
2009	"Come Back to Me"	Gavin Bowden
2011	"The Last Goodbye"	Nigel Dick
2011	"Fade Into Me"	Christopher Sims
2015	"Criminals"	Patrick Kiely
2020	"Reds Turn Blue"	Justin A. Nixon
2024	"Dead Weight"	
2024	"This Time Tomorrow 16"	Cory Zimmermann
