= The Declaration Tour =

2009 concert tour by David Cook

- Tour by David Cook
- Promotional poster for the tour
- Location: North America • Asia
- Associated album: David Cook
- Start date: February 13, 2009
- End date: December 1, 2009
- Legs: 2
- No. of shows: 152

David Cook concert chronology
- American Idols Live! Tour 2008 (2008); The Declaration Tour (2009); This Loud Tour (2011)

The Declaration Tour was the first headlining concert tour of the American rock singer-songwriter David Cook, who rose to fame after winning the seventh season of American Idol. The tour, spanning 152 shows across North America, earned an average gross of $46,263 per show.

== Background ==
The tour supported Cook's platinum self-titled album. The tour is named after "Declaration", the first track from the album and started on February 13, 2009, in Tallahassee, Florida, following Cook's appearance at Walt Disney World Resort's The American Idol Experience attraction. The tour was originally due to end on April 25, 2009, but had since been extended twice to finish until the end of year.

"I’m more than excited to hop on the road and support this record. This tour represents both a new beginning and a return to form for me," David says. "It's our first full tour, and we’re all ready to pour whatever blood, sweat, and tears that we can muster into making this show, and every show from here on out, an experience. Part of that experience is bringing back this college tour idea. There's something inherently nostalgic about playing college shows. So many amazing acts used to do it, so it's nice to be able to bring that ideal back, in some small way. And besides, touring on a bus beats what we used to do, which was cram five guys into a seven passenger van for one show, 13 hours away..."

Cook was originally supported on the tour with musicians Neal Tiemann (lead guitar, backing vocals), Andy Skib (rhythm guitar, keyboards, backing vocals), Kyle Peek (drums, backing vocals), and Joey Clement (bass guitar). Clement however was replaced by Monty Anderson on July 27, 2009, for the rest of the tour.

== Opening acts ==
- Ryan Star
- Needtobreathe
- Green River Ordinance
- Matt Nathanson
- Gin Blossoms
- Crash Kings
- Tonic
- The Script
- Hot Chelle Rae

Others who opened for David Cook include his friends from Tulsa; Bryan Jewett and Phil Marshall.

== Set list ==
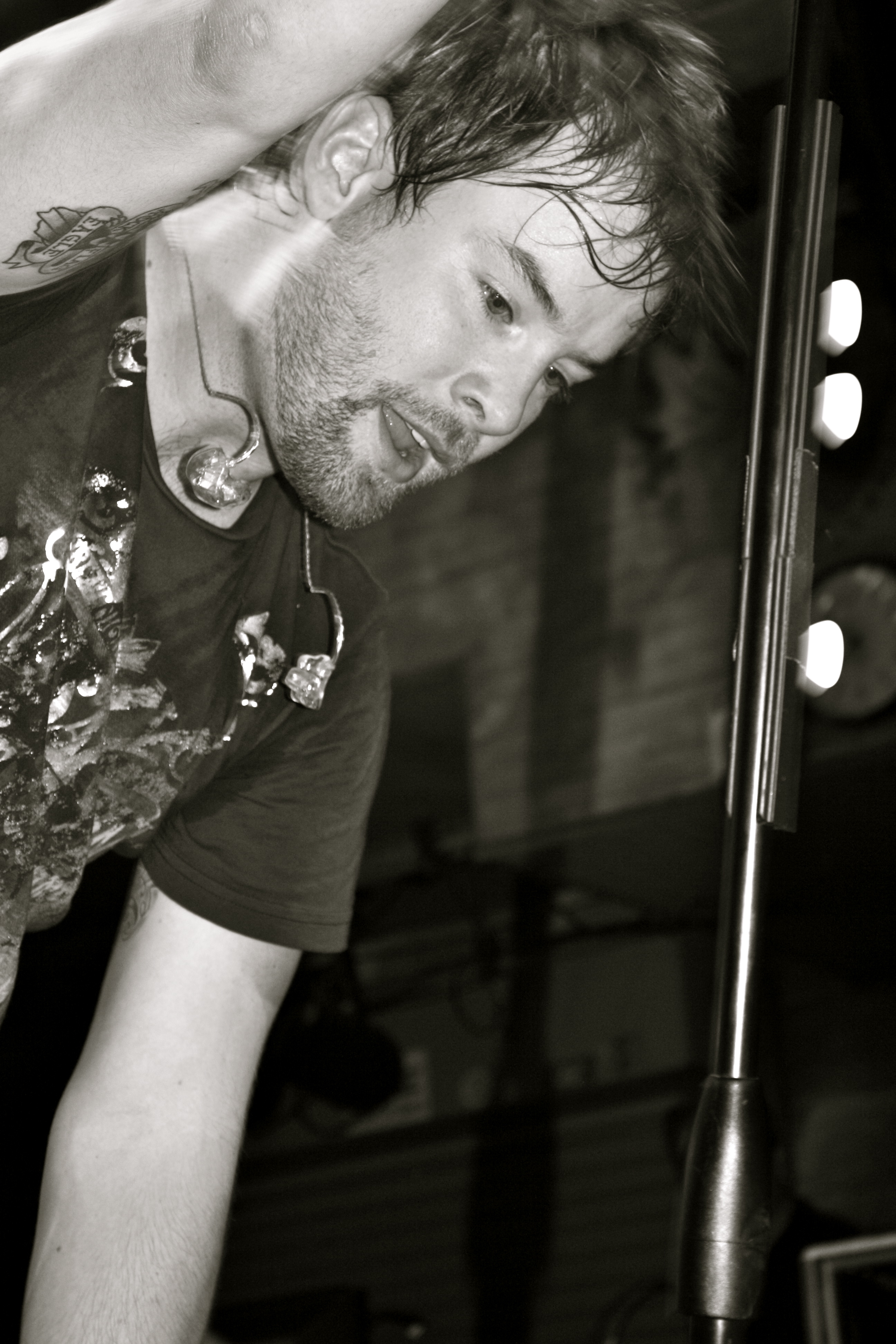
David Cook at the House of Blues, New Orleans on July 7, 2009

(Songs varied between shows and selected from the following list)

1. "Heroes"
2. "We're Only Honest When We're Sleeping"
3. "Mr. Sensitive"
4. "Breathe Tonight"
5. "Little Lies" (Fleetwood Mac cover)
6. "Lie"
7. "Declaration"
8. "My Last Request"
9. "Permanent"
10. "Make Me"
11. "Kiss on the Neck" (sometimes w/"Hotel California" (Eagles cover)
12. "Straight Ahead"
13. "I Did It for You"
14. "Billie Jean" (Michael Jackson cover)
15. "Avalanche" (sometimes acoustic)
16. "Come Back To Me"
17. "Life on the Moon" (sometimes acoustic)
18. "Hot for Teacher" (Van Halen cover)
19. "Livin' on a Prayer" (Bon Jovi cover, sometimes acoustic)
20. "Anodyne" (Midwest Kings cover)
21. "Light On"
22. "Hunger Strike" (Temple of the Dog cover)
23. "Man in the Box" (Alice in Chains cover, sometimes acoustic)
24. "The Truth"
25. "The World I Know" (Collective Soul cover)
26. "Souvenir"
27. "Always Be My Baby" (Mariah Carey cover)
28. "Silver"
29. Bar-ba-sol"
30. "A Daily AntheM"
31. "Last Train Home"
32. "Shattered Dreams" (Johnny Hates Jazz cover)
33. "Til I'm Blue" (Midwest Kings cover)
34. "(I Just) Died in Your Arms" (Cutting Crew cover)
35. "Make Believe"
36. "My Hero" (Foo Fighters cover)
37. "Every Day Is Exactly the Same" (Nine Inch Nails cover)

== Tour dates ==
Date	City	Country	Venue
February 13, 2009	Tallahassee	United States	Club Downunder at Florida State University
February 14, 2009	Biloxi	United States	Beau Rivage
February 15, 2009	Oxford	United States	University of Mississippi
February 18, 2009	Eau Claire	United States	University of Wisconsin–Eau Claire
February 19, 2009	Cedar Falls	United States	University of Northern Iowa
February 20, 2009	Green Bay	United States	University of Wisconsin–Green Bay
February 21, 2009	Valparaiso	United States	Valparaiso University
February 23, 2009	Waverly	United States	Wartburg College
February 24, 2009	Fulton	United States	Westminster College
February 25, 2009	Conway	United States	University of Central Arkansas
February 27, 2009	Portsmouth	United States	Shawnee State University
March 1, 2009	Newburgh	United States	Mount Saint Mary College
March 2, 2009	Brookville	United States	CW Post – LIU; Open to students only
March 3, 2009	Carlisle	United States	Dickinson College
March 6, 2009	Morgantown	United States	West Virginia University
March 7, 2009	Glassboro	United States	Rowan University; Open to students only
March 8, 2009	Willimantic	United States	Eastern Connecticut State University; Open to students only
March 10, 2009	Poughkeepsie	United States	Marist College
March 11, 2009	Brockport	United States	State University of New York at Brockport; Open to students only
March 13, 2009	Niagara Falls	United States	Seneca Niagara Casino
March 14, 2009	Elkins	United States	Davis & Elkins College
March 16, 2009	Bloomsburg	United States	Bloomsburg University
March 19, 2009	Mansifield	United States	Mansfield University of Pennsylvania
March 20, 2009	Atlantic City	United States	The Borgata
March 21, 2009	Atlantic City	United States	The Borgata
March 23, 2009	Selinsgrove	United States	Susquehanna University; Open to students only
March 24, 2009	York	United States	Penn State York
March 26, 2009	Buies Creek	United States	Campbell University
March 27, 2009	Pemberton	United States	Burlington County College
March 28, 2009	Williamsburg	United States	College of William & Mary; Open to students only
March 30, 2009	New London	United States	~~Colby–Sawyer College~~ Cancelled
March 31, 2009	New Haven	United States	~~Southern Connecticut State University~~ Cancelled
April 2, 2009	Wilmington	United States	Azalea Fest at UNC Wilmington
April 3, 2009	Townson	United States	Towson University; Open to students only
April 4, 2009	Lewisburg	United States	Bucknell University
April 5, 2009	Radford	United States	Radford University
April 7, 2009	Columbia	United States	University of South Carolina; Open to students only
April 8, 2009	Macon	United States	Mercer University
April 10, 2009	Knoxville	United States	The Square Room
April 11, 2009	Memphis	United States	Minglewood Hall
April 13, 2009	Joliet	United States	University of St. Francis; Open to students only
April 14, 2009	Macomb	United States	Western Illinois University
April 20, 2009	Tyler	United States	University of Texas at Tyler; Open to students only
April 21, 2009	Searcy	United States	Harding University
April 22, 2009	Kansas City	United States	Ameristar Casino Kansas City
April 24, 2009	Omaha	United States	Creighton University; Open to students only
April 25, 2009	Tulsa	United States	University of Tulsa
April 27, 2009	Rolla	United States	Missouri S&T
April 28, 2009	Warrensburg	United States	University of Central Missouri
April 29, 2009	Little Rock	United States	Revolution Music Room
May 1, 2009	Gainesville	United States	Common Grounds
May 2, 2009	West Palm Beach	United States	Sunfest
May 4, 2009	Athens	United States	Georgia Theatre
May 5, 2009	Louisville	United States	Headliners Music Club
May 6, 2009	Perrysburg	United States	Owens Community College; Rescheduled for September 9, 2009
May 8, 2009	Akron	United States	Musica
May 16, 2009	Pasay	Philippines	Mall of Asia Concert Grounds with David Archuleta
May 22, 2009	New York City	United States	New York University
May 23, 2009	Northampton	United States	Pearl Street Night Club
May 24, 2009	New Haven	United States	Toad's Place
May 26, 2009	Elyria	United States	Lorain County Community College
May 27, 2009	Springfield	United States	Clark State Community College
May 28, 2009	Newark	United States	Ohio State University at Newark
May 30, 2009	Virginia Beach	United States	The Patriotic Festival
May 31, 2009	Carrboro	United States	Cat's Cradle
June 18, 2009	Del Mar	United States	San Diego County Fair
June 20, 2009	Bonner Springs	United States	Capitol Federal Park at Sandstone
June 21, 2009	Wichita	United States	Cotillion Ballroom
June 23, 2009	Tulsa	United States	Cain's Ballroom
June 24, 2009	Oklahoma City	United States	Diamond Ballroom
June 26, 2009	Denver	United States	Ogden Theatre
June 27, 2009	Aspen	United States	Belly Up
June 28, 2009	Beaver Creek	United States	Vilar Center for the Arts
June 30, 2009	Santa Fe	United States	Lensic Theater
July 1, 2009	Amarillo	United States	Midnight Rodeo & Piranha Room
July 3, 2009	Thackerville	United States	WinStar World Casino
July 4, 2009	Baton Rouge	United States	Blue Bayou and Dixie Landin'
July 5, 2009	Galveston	United States	Moody Gardens
July 7, 2009	New Orleans	United States	House of Blues
July 8, 2009	Chattanooga	United States	Chattanooga Convention Center
July 10, 2009	Lansing	United States	Common Ground Music Festival
July 11, 2009	Chesaning	United States	Chesaning Showboat Music Festival
July 12, 2009	Chicago	United States	House of Blues
July 15, 2009	Duluth	United States	Duluth Entertainment Convention Center
July 16, 2009	Des Moines	United States	Simon Estes Amphitheater
July 17, 2009	Sioux City	United States	Orpheum Theatre
July 19, 2009	Indianapolis	United States	The Egyptian Room
July 20, 2009	Covington	United States	Madison Theater
July 22, 2009	Mahnomen	United States	Shooting Star Casino
July 23, 2009	West Bend	United States	Washington County Fair
July 24, 2009	Prior Lake	United States	Mystic Lake Casino
July 25, 2009	Monticello	United States	Great Jones County Fair
July 27, 2009	Harrington	United States	Delaware State Fair
July 29, 2009	Alexandria	United States	Birchmere Theater
July 30, 2009	Sayreville	United States	Starland Ballroom
July 31, 2009	Glenside	United States	Keswick Theatre
August 1, 2009	Ledyard	United States	MGM Grand at Foxwoods
August 3, 2009	Bethlehem	United States	Musikfest
August 4, 2009	Millvale	United States	Mr. Smalls Theater
August 6, 2009	New York City	United States	Nokia Theater
August 8, 2009	Columbus	United States	Ohio State Fair
August 9, 2009	Perrysburg	United States	Owens Community College
August 12, 2009	Ventura	United States	Ventura County Fair
August 14, 2009	Knoxville	United States	Tennessee Theatre
August 15, 2009	Lewisburg	United States	State Fair of West Virginia
August 20, 2009	Lancaster	United States	Antelope Valley Fair
August 21, 2009	Sacramento	United States	California State Fair
August 23, 2009	Yakima	United States	Capitol Theatre
August 24, 2009	Seattle	United States	Showbox SoDo
August 25, 2009	Spokane	United States	Knitting Factory
August 27, 2009	Casper	United States	Casper Events Center
August 29, 2009	Mitchell	United States	Corn Palace
August 30, 2009	Fargo	United States	The Venue at the Hub
September 1, 2009	Billings	United States	Shrine Auditorium
September 2, 2009	Idaho Fallas	United States	Civic Auditorium
September 3, 2009	Missoula	United States	Wilma Theatre
September 5, 2009	Salem	United States	Oregon State Fair
September 8, 2009	San Francisco	United States	The Fillmore
September 9, 2009	Los Angeles	United States	Henry Fonda Theatre
September 10, 2009	San Diego	United States	Spreckels Theater
September 15, 2009	Allegan	United States	Allegan County Fair
September 17, 2009	Cleveland	United States	House of Blues
September 18, 2009	York	United States	York Fair
September 20, 2009	Newport Beach	United States	Taste of Newport
September 26, 2009	Atlantic City	United States	Borgata Hotel Casino
September 27, 2009	Union	United States	Wilkins Theater, Kean University
September 28, 2009	Bloomsburg	United States	Bloomsburg Fair
October 2, 2009	Montreal	Canada	Metropolis
October 3, 2009	Ottawa	Canada	Ritual Nightclub
October 9, 2009	Clifton Park	United States	Northern Lights
October 10, 2009	Providence	United States	Lupo's Heartbreak Hotel
October 11, 2009	Charlottesville	United States	Paramount Theater
October 13, 2009	Richmond	United States	The National
October 15, 2009	North Myrtle Beach	United States	House of Blues
October 16, 2009	Greensboro	United States	N Club
October 17, 2009	Columbia	United States	South Carolina State Fair
October 18, 2009	Perry	United States	Georgia National Fair
November 3, 2009	Phoenix	United States	Arizona State Fair
November 4, 2009	El Paso	United States	Club 101
November 6, 2009	Shawnee	United States	Firelake Grand Casino
November 7, 2009	Houston	United States	Warehouse Live
November 8, 2009	Dallas	United States	Palladium Ballroom
November 10, 2009	St. Louis	United States	The Pageant
November 11, 2009	Milwaukee	United States	Riverside Theater
November 12, 2009	Friant	United States	Table Mountain Casino
November 14, 2009	Windsor	Canada	Caesars Windsor Casino
November 16, 2009	Orillia	Canada	Casino Rama
November 18, 2009	Hammond	United States	The Venue at Horseshoe
November 19, 2009	Peoria	United States	Peoria Civic Center
November 20, 2009	Elizabeth	United States	Horseshoe Southern Indiana
November 23, 2009	Atlanta	United States	The Tabernacle
November 24, 2009	Mobile	United States	Saenger Theatre
November 27, 2009	St. Petersburg	United States	Mahaffey Theater
November 28, 2009	Orlando	United States	Hard Rock Live
November 29, 2009	Davie	United States	Arena at D. Taft University Center
December 1, 2009	Charlotte	United States	The Fillmore
December 2, 2009	Norfolk	United States	~~Ted Constant Convocation Center~~ Cancelled

== Band ==
- Neal Tiemann: Lead guitar, backing vocals
- Andy Skib: Rhythm guitar, keyboards, backing vocals
- Joey Clement: Bass guitar (Left tour midway, replaced by Monty Anderson)
- Monty Anderson: Bass guitar (replaced Clement on July 27, 2009, for the rest of the tour)
- Kyle Peek: Drums, backing vocals
