= Neal Tiemann =

American guitarist

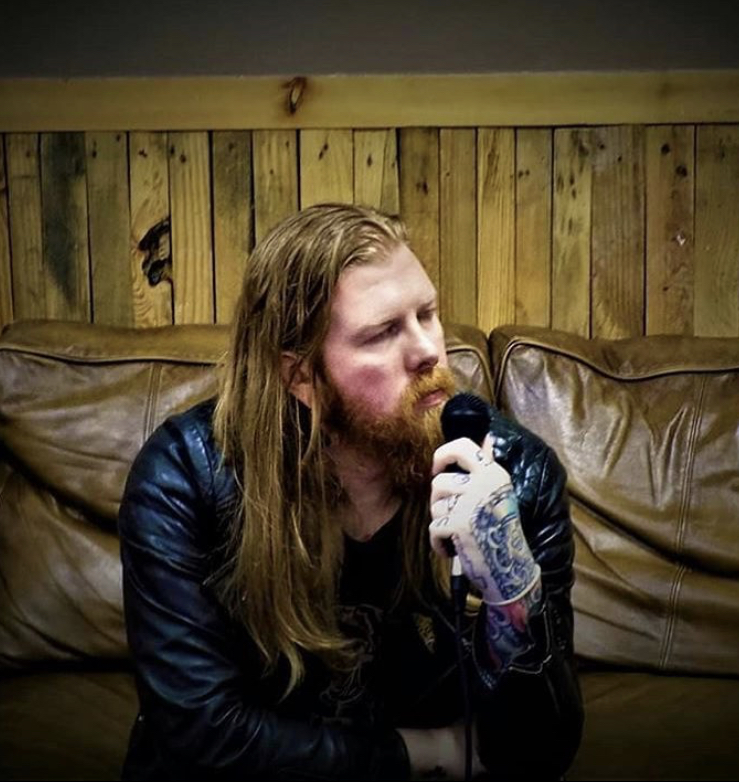
- Tiemann in 2018

Background information
- Also known as: Dr (the Doctor); NFT
- Born: Neal Andrew Tiemann; December 22, 1982 (age 43); Dallas, Texas, U.S.
- Genres: Alternative rock; post-grunge; hard rock; groove metal; melodic death metal; deathcore
- Occupations: Musician; songwriter
- Instrument: Guitar
- Years active: 2001–present
- Website: nftmusic.com

Neal Tiemann (born December 22, 1982) is an American musician, currently the lead guitarist and songwriter of the rock band the Midwest Kings (MWK). He is a former rhythm guitarist for heavy metal band DevilDriver, and served as the lead guitarist for David Cook's band, The Anthemic, from 2008 to 2011. He spent most of 2009 on the Declaration Tour with Cook and served as the tour's music director. Tiemann played guitar on Cook's major label debut album, David Cook (2008), as well as his independently released, Analog Heart (2006). Tiemann also played on Burn Halo's 2009 self-titled album and Bryan Jewett's album A Brief Look at the New You. Tiemann and the rest of The Anthemic worked on Cook's second album, This Loud Morning (2011). In January 2020, he was recruited as a touring lead guitarist for premiere deathcore band, Carnifex, later officially joining in 2022.

== Early career: 2001–2008 ==
- Midwest Kings
- David Cook – Analog Heart
- Bryan Jewett – A Brief Look at the New You

== 2008–present ==
- Midwest Kings
- To Have Heroes
- Caroline's Spine – Work It Out
- David Cook – David Cook, This Loud Morning
- Burn Halo – Burn Halo
- Uncle Kracker – Happy Hour
- Carnifex – Necromanteum

== Equipment ==
Tiemann is seen playing Gibson guitars exclusively. He can be seen playing Gibson RD guitars such as an ebony with EMG pickups, a natural, and a silverburst. He also uses Gibson Les Paul guitars such as a sunburst and an ebony with 3 pickups and with gold hardware. He can also be seen with a black Gibson Explorer with EMG pickups and a Gibson Hummingbird in heritage cherry sunburst finish.

== Appearances ==
=== On Tour ===
From January 18 to 25, 2009, Tiemann traveled with bandmates David Cook (guitar and lead vocals), Andy Skib (rhythm guitar, keyboards, backup vocals), Kyle Peek (drums, backing vocals), and Joey Clement (bass guitar) to the Middle East to complete a USO tour. The band visited seven bases on their trip to Kuwait and Iraq and played songs from David Cook as well as crowd-pleasing covers including Tenacious D's Fuck Her Gently and Van Halen's "Hot for Teacher".

In mid-February 2009, Tiemann embarked on a nationwide tour serving as musical director and lead guitarist for The Declaration Tour to support the platinum-selling, major-label debut David Cook. The tour began at Club Downunder in Tallahassee, Florida, on February 13, 2009, and was originally set to end in Tulsa, Oklahoma on April 25, 2009. The tour was extended through the fall and came to a close on December 1, 2009, at The Fillmore in Charlotte, North Carolina after 154 shows.

In mid-May 2009, Tiemann and bandmates took a short break from the North American leg of the Declaration Tour to travel to Manila in the Philippines. Tiemann made numerous appearances on Filipino television with David Cook leading up to a one night concert playing to upwards of 40,000 attendees at the SM Mall of Asia in Manila on May 16, 2009.

=== Music videos ===
Year	Song	Capacity	Performer	Director
2008	"Light On"	Lead guitar	David Cook	Wayne Isham
2009	"Come Back To Me"	Lead guitar	David Cook	Gavin Bowden
2011	"The Last Goodbye"	Lead guitar	David Cook	Nigel Dick

== Discography ==
=== Studio albums ===
Year	Album details / Artist	Capacity	Peak chart positions					Certifications (sales threshold)
Year	Album details / Artist	Capacity	US	US Heat	US Rock	CAN	FIN	Certifications (sales threshold)
----	Winds of Change: The Acoustics (MWK): Released: Unknown; Label: self-released	Producer, lead guitar, songwriter	–	–	–	–	–	US Sales: Unknown
2003	Midwest Kings (MWK): Released: June 6, 2003; Label: self-released	Producer, lead guitar, songwriter	–	–	–	–	–	US sales: Unknown
2004	The Story Thus Far (Axium): Released: July 16, 2004; Label: self-released	Bass	–	–	–	–	–	US sales: Unknown
2004	Judging A Bullet (MWK): Released: September 25, 2004; Label: self-released	Producer, lead guitar, songwriter	–	–	–	–	–	US sales: Unknown
2006	Analog Heart (David Cook): Released: May 6, 2006; Label: self-released	Guitar (Tracks 4, 5, 8)	–	–	–	–	–	US sales: 1,595
2006	Incoherent With Desire To Move On (MWK): Released: December 1, 2006; Label: self-released	Producer, lead guitar, songwriter	–	–	–	–	–	US sales: Unknown
2007	A Brief Look at the New You (Bryan Jewett): Released: April 20, 2007; Label: self-released	Producer, guitar, trombone	–	–	–	–	–	US sales: Unknown
2008	Luna Despierta EP – Digital Release (MWK): Released: June 18, 2008; Label: self-released	Producer, lead guitar, songwriter	–	–	–	–	–	US sales: Unknown
2008	Work It Out (Caroline's Spine): Released: September 16, 2008; Label: 7th Kid Entertainment	Co-producer	–	–	–	–	–	US sales: Unknown
2008	David Cook (David Cook): Released: November 18, 2008; Label: RCA Records/19	Lead guitar, songwriter	3	2	–	11	15	US sales: 1,300,000; RIAA: Platinum; CRIA: Gold
2009	Burn Halo (Burn Halo): Released: March 31, 2009; Label: Rawkhead Rekords	Lead guitar, songwriter	129	2	22	–	–	US sales: Unknown
2009	Happy Hour (Uncle Kracker): Released: September 15, 2009; Label: Atlantic Records	Guest musician	38	–	13	–	–	US Sales: Unknown
2010	Luna Despierta EP (MWK): Released: February 18, 2010; Label: self-released	Lead guitar, producer, songwriter	–	–	–	–	–	US sales: Unknown
2016	Trust No One (DevilDriver): Released: May 13, 2016; Label: Napalm Records	Rhythm guitar	–	–	–	–	–	US sales: Unknown
2023	Necromanteum (Carnifex): Released: October 6, 2023; Label: Nuclear Blast	Lead guitar	–	–	–	–	–	US sales: unknown
"—" denotes the album failed to chart or not released

=== Singles ===
Year	Single	Peak chart positions								Artist	Album	Capacity
Year	Single	US	US Pop	US AC	US Adult	US Rock	CAN	UK	NZ	Artist	Album	Capacity
2008	Light On	17	20	10	4	—	27	184	8	David Cook	David Cook	Lead guitarist
2009	"Bar-ba-sol"	—	—	—	—	—	—	—	—	David Cook	David Cook	Lead guitarist
2009	"Come Back to Me"	63	49	15	9	—	—	—	—	David Cook	David Cook	Lead guitarist
2009	"Dirty Little Girl"	—	—	—	—	19	—	—	—	Burn Halo	Burn Halo	Lead guitarist
2009	"Permanent" (charity single)	24	34	—	—	—	26	—	—	David Cook	Live	Lead guitarist
"—" denotes the single failed to chart, not released, or not certified

=== Songwriting ===
Year	Song	Album	Performer	Extra notes
2003	"Godspeed"	Midwest Kings	Midwest Kings	—
2003	"Room for Two"	Midwest Kings	Midwest Kings	—
2003	"Fairweather Friend"	Midwest Kings	Midwest Kings	—
2003	"Lemmings"	Midwest Kings	Midwest Kings	—
2003	"Undertow"*	Midwest Kings	Midwest Kings	—
2003	"Waterside"**	Midwest Kings	Midwest Kings	—
2003	"Thrill of It All"	Midwest Kings	Midwest Kings	—
2003	"Forever Fall"	Midwest Kings	Midwest Kings	—
2005	"Waiting Room"	Judging A Bullet	Midwest Kings	—
2005	"Call To Arms"	Judging A Bullet	Midwest Kings	—
2005	"Railway Reality"	Judging A Bullet	Midwest Kings	—
2005	"Judging A Bullet"***	Judging A Bullet	Midwest Kings	—
2005	"'Til I'm Blue"	Judging A Bullet	Midwest Kings	
2005	"Passenger"	Judging A Bullet	Midwest Kings	
2005	"Roses & Cyanide"	Judging A Bullet	Midwest Kings	
2005	"8 Ways to Decay"	Judging A Bullet	Midwest Kings	
2005	"Drone"	Judging A Bullet	Midwest Kings	
2005	"By Accident"	Judging A Bullet	Midwest Kings	
2005	"Splinter"	Judging A Bullet	Midwest Kings	
2006	"Circle's Anthem"	Incoherent With Desire to Move On	Midwest Kings	
2006	"Killing More Than Time"	Incoherent With Desire to Move On	Midwest Kings	
2006	"Make Me"	Incoherent With Desire to Move On	Midwest Kings	
2006	"One True Thing"	Incoherent With Desire to Move On	Midwest Kings	
2006	"Rearview"	Incoherent With Desire to Move On	Midwest Kings	
2006	"Song To Me"	Incoherent With Desire to Move On	Midwest Kings	
2008	"Anodyne"^	Luna Despierta EP	Midwest Kings	
2008	"A Scarlet Letters"	Luna Despierta EP	Midwest Kings	
2008	"Stuck Under Wheels"	Luna Despierta EP	Midwest Kings	
2008	"Vera"	Luna Despierta EP	Midwest Kings	
2008	"Fairweather Friend"***	To Have Heroes EP	To Have Heroes	
2008	"Reasons"* ***	To Have Heroes EP	To Have Heroes	
2008	"Kiss on the Neck"^	David Cook	David Cook	Hidden Track
2009	"Dirty Little Girl"*** ^^	Burn Halo	Burn Halo	Peak: #19 Mainstream Rock Tracks
2009	"Save Me"*** ^^	Burn Halo	Burn Halo	Featured in the video game WWE SmackDown vs. Raw 2009
2009	"Dead End Roads and Lost Highways"*** ^^	Burn Halo	Burn Halo	
—N/a	"All You Could Not See"	–	Midwest Kings	
—N/a	"Dear Heaven"	–	David Cook	
—N/a	"Not Me"	–	David Cook	
—N/a	"Shades of Red"	–	Midwest Kings	
—N/a	"Until Dawn"	–	Midwest Kings	

- *Co-Written with Andy Skib
- **Co-Written with Justin Briggs
- ***Co-Written with Zac Maloy
- ^ Co-Written with David Cook
- ^^ Co-Written with James Hart
