= Andy Skib =

American singer-songwriter

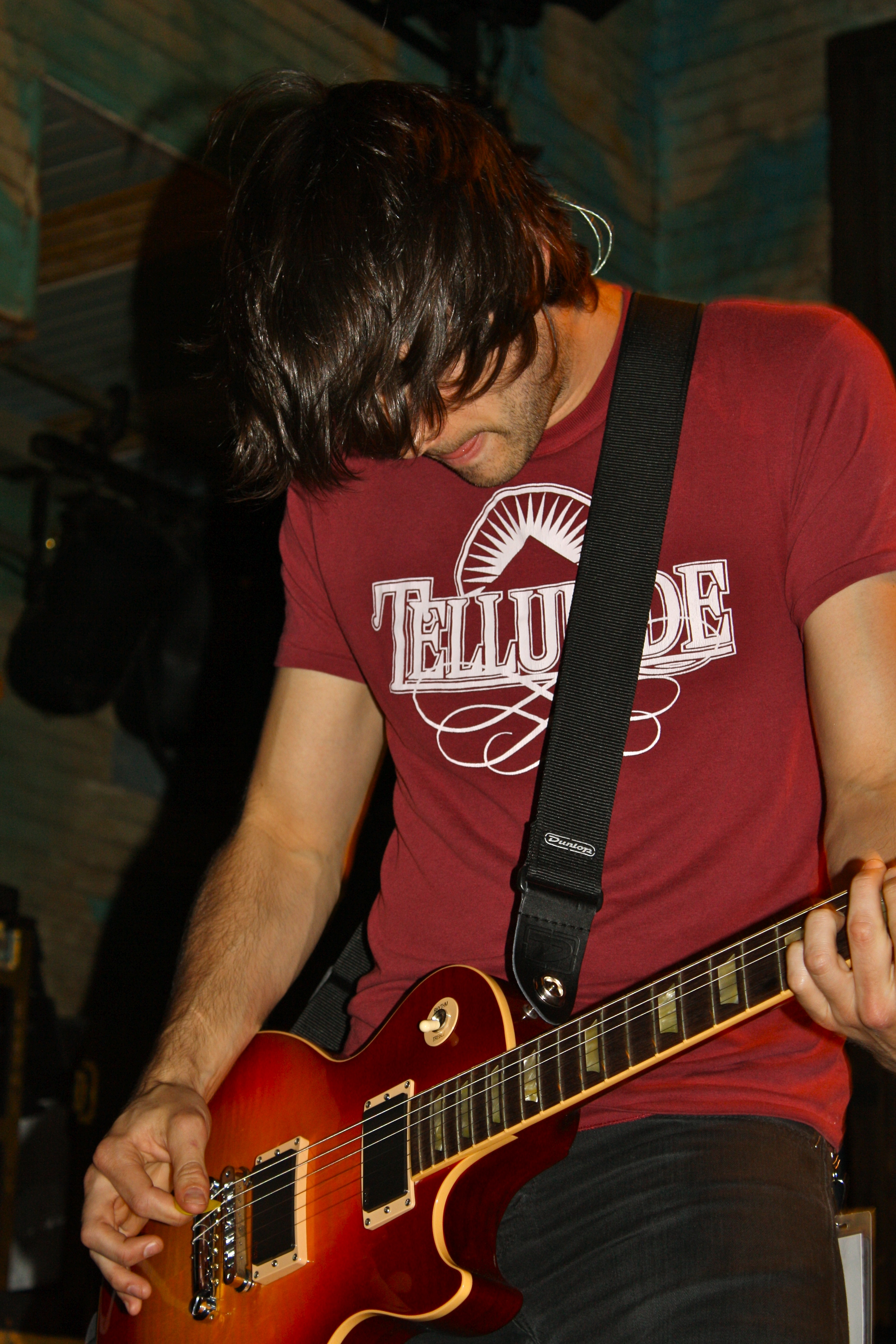
- Andy Skib at the House of Blues, New Orleans, LA (performing with David Cook) – July 7, 2009

Background information
- Born: Andrew Powers Skib; November 9, 1985 (age 40); San Diego, California, U.S.
- Genres: Alternative rock; pop rock
- Occupations: Singer; musician; songwriter
- Instruments: Guitar; keyboard; piano; vocals
- Years active: 2002–present
- Website: To Have Heroes Official MySpace

Andy Skib (born November 9, 1985, San Diego, California) is the lead singer of the rock band Midwest Kings (MWK). He spent most of 2009 on the Declaration Tour with American Idol season seven winner David Cook. Skib has previously co-written songs with former David Cook bandmate, Neal Tiemann, who also served as lead guitarist for their band, Midwest Kings (MWK). Additionally, he has co-written songs with artists Zac Maloy (The Nixons), Hanson, Graham Colton, and Jaret Reddick (Bowling for Soup). Skib is also known for his most recent solo project, To Have Heroes. Skib was a member of David Cook's band, The Anthemic, providing rhythm guitar, keyboards and backup vocals. Skib and the rest of The Anthemic worked on Cook's second album for RCA Records. The album, entitled This Loud Morning, was released on June 28, 2011.

== Musical background ==
Skibb's musical influences are Sting and Jason Mraz.

== Early career: 2002–2008 ==
- Midwest Kings
- The Pearls
- David Cook – Analog Heart
- Bryan Jewett

== 2008–present ==
- To Have Heroes
- Midwest Kings
- David Cook – David Cook
- David Cook – This Loud Morning
- David Cook - Digital Vein

== Appearances ==
=== On tour ===
From January 18–25, 2009, Skib traveled with bandmates David Cook(guitar and lead vocals), Neal Tiemann (music director, lead guitar), Kyle Peek (drums, backing vocals), and Joey Clement (bass guitar) to the Middle East to complete a USO Tour. The band visited seven bases on their trip to Kuwait and Iraq and played songs from David Cook as well as crowd-pleasing covers including Tenacious D's Fuck Her Gently and Van Halen's Hot for Teacher.

In mid-February 2009, Skib embarked on a nationwide tour serving as rhythm guitarist and keyboardist in addition to singing backup vocals for Cook's The Declaration Tour to support his platinum-selling self-titled major-label debut. Skib has had the opportunity to perform lead vocals on "Make Me" and "'Til I'm Blue" (Midwest Kings songs) more than once during the run of the tour. The tour on February 13, 2009, and was originally set to end on April 25, 2009. The tour was extended through the fall and came to a close on December 1, 2009, after 154 shows.

In mid-May 2009, Skib and bandmates took a short break from the North American leg of the tour to travel to Manila in the Philippines. The band played a one night concert playing to upwards of 40,000 attendees at the SM Mall of Asia in Manila on May 16, 2009.

In mid-October 2011, Skib embarked on his second nationwide tour with David Cook, this time to support Cook's second major-label album This Loud Morning. The tour, which was co-headlined by Gavin DeGraw, began on October 9, 2011, and finished on November 11, 2011.

=== Music videos ===
Year	Song	Capacity	Performer	Director
2008	"Light On"	Guitar, keyboard	David Cook	Wayne Isham
2009	"Come Back To Me"	Guitar	David Cook	Gavin Bowden
2011	"The Last Goodbye"	—N/a	David Cook	Nigel Dick
2011	"Fade into Me"	Guitar	David Cook	Christopher Sims

== Discography ==
=== Songs written ===
Year	Artist	Album	Song	Written with
2011	David Cook	This Loud Morning	"Goodbye to the Girl"	David Cook, Neal Tiemann
2015	David Cook	Digital Vein	"Kiss & Tell"	David Cook, Andy Waldeck
2015	David Cook	Digital Vein	"I'm Gonna Love You"	David Cook, Andy Waldeck
2015	David Cook	Digital Vein	"Where Do You Go"	David Cook, Andy Waldeck
2015	David Cook	Digital Vein	"But You Won't"	David Cook
2015	David Cook	Digital Vein	"We're Not In This Alone"	David Cook, Bronson
2020	Caylee Hammack	If It Wasn't for You	"Forged in the Fire"	Caylee Hammack, Thomas Finchum
2021	Mickey Guyton	Remember Her Name	"Do You Really Wanna Know"	Mickey Guyton, Melissa Fuller

=== Songs produced ===
Year	Artist	Song	Album	Produced with
2017	Brett Eldredge	"Somethin' I'm Good At"	Brett Eldredge	Brett Eldredge, Ross Copperman, Scott Johnson
2021	Mickey Guyton	Remember Her Name	"Do You Really Wanna Know"	

=== Studio albums ===
Year	Album details / Artist	Capacity	Notes
2003	Midwest Kings (MWK): Released: June 6, 2003; Label: self-released	Lead vocals	—N/a
2004	Judging A Bullet (MWK): Released: September 25, 2004; Label: self-released	Lead vocals	—N/a
2006	The Great Burrito Extortion Case (Bowling for Soup): Released: November 7, 2006; Label: Jive, Zomba	Whistle	
2006	Analog Heart (David Cook): Released: May 6, 2006; Label: self-released	Engineer (Tracks 4, 5, 8); Backing vocals (Track 10)	—N/a
2006	Incoherent With Desire To Move On (MWK): Released: December 1, 2006; Label: self-released	Lead vocals	—N/a
2007	A Brief Look at the New You (Bryan Jewett): Released: April 20, 2007; Label: self-released	Engineer, guitar, keyboards, backing vocals	—N/a
2008	Luna Despierta EP (MWK): Released: June 18, 2008; Label: self-released	Lead vocals	—N/a
2008	To Have Heroes EP (To Have Heroes): Released: July 19, 2008; Label: self-released	Co-Producer, lead vocals	—N/a
2010	Wake the Dead (Mike Kelly): Released: August 24, 2010; Label: self-released	Backing vocals, piano	—N/a
2010	The Sanctuary Live Sessions (MWK): Released: October 31, 2010; Label: self-released	Engineer, lead vocals, keyboards, guitar	—N/a
2011	Lost in America EP (To Have Heroes): Released: May 10, 2011; Label: self-released	Lead vocals, piano, guitar	—N/a
2011	This Loud Morning (David Cook): Released: June 28, 2011; Label: RCA	Backing vocals, piano, guitar, composer	*US peak; 7; *CAN peak; 23; *US sales: 89,000
2011	Luna Espera EP (MWK): Released: November 8, 2011; Label: self-released	Lead Vocals, guitar	—N/a
2012	Luna Se Hunde EP (MWK): Released: June 12, 2012; Label: self-released	Lead vocals, guitar	—N/a
2015	Digital Vein (David Cook): Released September 18, 2015; Label: Analog Heart, INgrooves	Composer, engineer, guitar, programming, vocals	—N/a
2017	Brett Eldredge (Brett Eldredge): Released: August 4, 2017; Label: Atlantic Nashville	Guitar, keyboard, producer, background vocals, programmer	—N/a
2020	Here and Now (Kenny Chesney): Released: May 1, 2020; Label: Blue Chair, Warner Nashville	Assistant engineer, background vocals, electric guitar, engineer	*US peak; 2; *US Top Country Albums peak; 1; *US sales: 500,000
2020	If It Wasn't for You (Caylee Hammack): Released: August 14, 2020; Label: Capitol Nashville	Composer, electric guitar, programming	
2021	Remember Her Name (Mickey Guyton): Released: September 24, 2021; Label: Capitol Nashville	Composer, background vocals, electric guitar	*US Heatseekers Albums peak; 7; *US Top Country Albums peak; 47

=== Single(s) ===
Year	Single	Peak chart positions								Artist	Album	Capacity
Year	Single	US	US Pop	US AC	US Adult	US Rock	CAN	UK	Digital	Artist	Album	Capacity
2009	"Permanent" (charity single)	24	34	—	—	—	26	—	10	David Cook	Live	Pianist
2011	"The Last Goodbye"	105	—	20	29	—	72	—	—	David Cook	This Loud Morning	Backing vocals, electric guitar, piano
2011	"Fade into Me"	–	–	–	–	–	–	–	-	David Cook	This Loud Morning	Backing vocals, electric guitar
"—" denotes the single failed to chart, not released, or not certified
