= Blindsided (album) =

Studio album by Axium
- Released: 2003
- Genre: Hard rock Post-grunge
- Label: Hello Klameleon Records
- Producer: Paul Johnson, Tom Basile, and Axium

Axium chronology
Matter of Time (2002)	Blindsided (2003)	Alive in Tulsa (2004)

Blindsided is the second studio album by the band Axium, and the first to be released with a label. It features David Cook (vocals, guitar); Bobby Kerr (drums); Jerron Nichols (bass); Tom Basile (bass); and Jeff Shrout (guitar); with guest vocals on ‘Hold’ by Andy Skib (Midwest Kings (MWK)) and Mikey J (Mad Verb, New Science). The album was produced by Paul Johnson, Tom Basile, and Axium; recorded at “In The Can Mobile Studios” by Paul Johnson; and mixed and mastered by Tom Basile at Holy Toledo.

== Track listing ==
All tracks are written by David Cook and Jeff Shrout, except "Still" by David Cook.

No.	Title	Length
1.	"Feed Your Ego"	4:04
2.	"Hold"	5:00
3.	"Testament"	4:40
4.	"Just in Case"	4:45
5.	"Clean Break"	4:33
6.	"Thought You Knew"	4:17
7.	"Leave Behind"	6:59
8.	"Truth Is a Gun"	5:06
9.	"Therapy"	3:59
10.	"Still" (Bonus track from Blindsided: Limited Edition)	3:19

== Notes ==
"Hold," was picked up by AMC Theatres Movie Tunes and was played before previews on over 20,000 screens nationwide.

The band distributed a Blindsided Limited Edition CD at live shows in Warrensburg, MO and Kansas City, MO September 12 & 13, 2003. This limited edition included the 9 tracks of the original "Blindsided" album, plus a Bonus Track "Still" (3:19) written by David Cook.
