= The Last Song I'll Write for You =

Single by David Cook
- Released: May 4, 2012
- Recorded: 2012
- Genre: Pop rock; alternative rock
- Length: 3:31
- Label: Analog Heart Music
- Songwriter(s): David Cook; Andy Skib; Daniel James
- Producer(s): John Fields

David Cook singles chronology
"Fade into Me" (2011)	"The Last Song I'll Write for You" (2012)	"Laying Me Low" (2013)

"The Last Song I'll Write for You" is a song recorded by American Idol season 7 winner and singer-songwriter David Cook. It was released independently as a single through Cook's imprint Analog Heart Music on May 4, 2012, following his departure from RCA Records.

== Content ==
"The Last Song I'll Write for You" is a mid-tempo rock ballad that draws on elements of both pop rock and alternative rock. Kevin Rutherford of Billboard described the song's style as "adult alternative." Its lyrics describe a breakup and moving on from a relationship that is no longer healthy, which, given the timing of its release, has led critics to speculate that the song refers to Cook's split from his record label. Cook, however, has dismissed this theory, explaining to Yahoo! Music that the ballad was inspired by "an ex from long, long, long ago."

== Background and release ==
"The Last Song I'll Write for You" was written by Cook, Andy Skib, and Daniel James, and was produced by John Fields. It was released to digital retailers on May 4, 2012 before Cook premiered the song on the May 10, 2012 episode of the eleventh season of American Idol.

== Reception ==
=== Commercial performance ===
The single sold 15,000 copies in its first week of release, debuting and peaking at number 45 on the Billboard Pop Digital Songs chart.

=== Critical reception ===
Grady Smith of Entertainment Weekly says "the slow-burn hook on this self-released breakup ballad is earnestly catchy."

== Chart performance ==
Chart (2012)	Peak position
US Pop Digital Songs (Billboard)	45
