= This Loud Morning =

2011 album by David Cook

Studio album by David Cook
- Released: June 28, 2011
- Recorded: 2010–2011
- Genres: Rock; alternative rock; pop rock
- Length: 48:20 (Standard Edition); 56:14 (Deluxe Edition)
- Labels: RCA; 19
- Producer: Matt Serletic

David Cook chronology
David Cook (2008)	This Loud Morning (2011)	Digital Vein (2015)

Deluxe Edition
- Deluxe edition cover

Singles from This Loud Morning
- 1. "The Last Goodbye" Released: April 19, 2011; 2. "Fade into Me" Released: October 10, 2011

This Loud Morning is the second major-label studio album, third overall by American singer-songwriter David Cook. It was released on June 28, 2011, by RCA Records. Executive produced by Matt Serletic, the album featured tracks written and co-written by Cook along with many acclaimed songwriters, including Johnny Rzeznik, David Hodges, Ryan Tedder, Kevin Griffin, Scott Stevens and Marti Frederiksen.

== Background ==
Cook began to concentrate working on this his second album after his first major tour, the Declaration Tour, concluded in December 2009. While on the tour, he put down some riffs and lyrical ideas, and started song-writing as a band towards the end of the tour. He collaborated with a number of songwriters, early collaborators on his song-writing included Matt Squire, Brian Howes, Claude Kelly, Max Martin, Raine Maida, Scott Stevens and John Rzeznik. More than 80 songs were written for the album, and 14 were tracked. He had hoped initially that a single would be ready for release in April 2010 and the album that summer. However, a producer for the album was not announced until May, and recording started in June that year with producer Matt Serletic at the helm.

Before recording, he said he has "lofty ideas" for his second album and described early songs written with Julian Emery and Jim Irvin as having "massive choruses" and "very U2-esque". At the beginning his goal was to make an album that "really, really pushed the concept of dynamic".

=== Theme ===
Cook wanted the album to have a loose theme within the record that is open to interpretation by the listener. He described the opening song "Circadian" as being about "falling asleep and escaping the day, and using sleep as a reprieve", the middle of the album being "the gestation cycle of a relationship from start to finish", and the ending track "Rapid Eye Movement" being about waking up from a dream and having to face actual reality.

Cook revealed "Rapid Eye Movement" was written early on in the writing process, and the song "opened up [his] thought process to the rest of this record". On using sleep and dream as a narrative theme, he added, "I like that romantic idea of living an entire life for yourself while you’re asleep".

== Album title ==
The title of the album is from a line in lyrics from a song on the album called "Rapid Eye Movement" – "Give me one more quiet night, 'fore this loud morning gets it right and does me in."

== Critical reception ==
Professional ratings
Review scores
Source	Rating
Allmusic	3/5 stars
American Songwriter	3/5 stars
Blinded by Sound	Mixed
Entertainment Weekly	(B−)

AllMusic gave the album 3 out of 5 stars stating that "This Loud Morning winds up as an album that's primarily textural mood music for the morning, and one that's not all that loud either". American Songwriter also gave the album 3 out of 5 stars stating that "This Loud Morning has a much more artistic vibe combined with a rawness evident in Cook's vocal performances not found on his previous Rob Cavallo produced release. This is refreshing considering Serletic's meticulous production style often results in songs becoming trapped in immense layers of over produced schlock. The album includes balanced amounts of strings, piano, and crunchy guitar, which all suit this more mature sounding material. Cook's more developed lyrics, melodic structures (he co-wrote all 12 tracks), and grittier vocal performances throughout the album abundantly display his overall growth as an artist." Entertainment Weekly also gave the album a positive review. Entertainment Weekly stated that This Loud Morning, uses closing-credits-of-a-Michael-Bay-movie bombast too often to suffocate otherwise sweet, sometimes whimsical experiments like the album-opening Circadian.

== Singles ==
"The Last Goodbye" was the first official single from the album and was released on April 19, 2011. The song made its debut live on the American Idol (season 10) top 7 results show on April 21, 2011. "The Last Goodbye" sold 22,000 copies in its first week and entered the Bubbling Under Hot 100 chart at number five.

"Fade into Me" is the second single from the album. It was released on October 10, 2011.

== Track listing ==
No.	Title	Writer(s)	Length
1.	"Circadian"	David Cook; David Hodges; Neal Tiemann	4:53
2.	"Right Here, with You"	Cook; Johnny Rzeznik; Ryan Star; Gregg Wattenberg	3:18
3.	"We Believe"	Cook; Julian Emery; Jim Irvin	4:22
4.	"Fade into Me"	Cook; Kevin Griffin; Jamie Houston	4:06
5.	"Hard to Believe"	Cook; Hodges; Jess Cates; Lindy Robbins	3:52
6.	"Take Me as I Am"	Cook; Marti Frederiksen; Scott Stevens	4:06
7.	"Time Marches On"	Cook; Frederiksen	3:42
8.	"The Last Goodbye"	Cook; Ryan Tedder	3:00
9.	"Paper Heart"	Cook; Emery; Irvin	3:36
10.	"4 Letter Word"	Cook; Claude Kelly; Matt Squire	3:09
11.	"Goodbye to the Girl"	Cook, Tiemann; Andy Skib	4:18
12.	"Rapid Eye Movement"	Cook; Hodges	5:57

Deluxe edition
No.	Title	Writer(s)	Length
13.	"This Is Not the Last Time"	Cook; Hodges; Chris DeStefano	3:47
14.	"Let Me Fall for You"	Cook; Rune Westberg	3:51

Japanese edition
No.	Title	Length
15.	"The Last Goodbye" (acoustic)
16.	"Right Here, with You" (acoustic)
17.	"Take Me as I Am" (acoustic)
18.	"Goodbye to the Girl" (acoustic)
19.	"Paper Heart" (acoustic)

== Chart performance and sales ==
This Loud Morning debuted at number 7 on the Billboard 200 selling 46,000 copies in the United States. and at number 23 on the Canadian Albums Chart. As of August 2015 the album has sold 133,000 copies.

Chart (2011)	Peak Position
US Billboard 200	7
US Billboard Top Digital Albums	6
US Billboard Top Internet Albums	1
Canadian Albums Chart	23
South Korean International Albums Chart	22

== This Quiet Night EP ==
This Quiet Night

EP by David Cook
- Released: June 28, 2011 (Pre-order) February 7, 2012 (Walmart Exclusive)
- Recorded: May 2011
- Genre: Acoustic rock
- Length: 17:55
- Label: RCA

This Quiet Night, is an EP packaged with This Loud Morning fan editions available exclusively via Cook's official music store and consists of acoustic performances of select album tracks. The CD version became available when it was released as a Walmart exclusive on February 7, 2012.

=== Track listing ===
No.	Title	Length
1.	"The Last Goodbye"	3:05
2.	"Right Here, With You"	3:13
3.	"Take Me As I Am"	4:00
4.	"Goodbye to the Girl"	4:13
5.	"Paper Heart"	3:22

== Personnel ==
Band members

- David Cook – lead and backing vocals, rhythm guitar
- Monty Anderson – bass guitar
- Kyle Peek – drums, backing vocals
- Andy Skib – rhythm guitar, background vocals, piano
- Neal Tiemann – lead guitar, acoustic baritone guitar

Musicians

- Mark Castrillon – background vocals
- Chris Chaney – bass guitar
- Dorian Crozier – drums
- Kaare Kabel Mai – drums
- Jamie Muhoberac – keyboards
- Tim Pierce – acoustic guitar, rhythm guitar
- Joel Shearer – acoustic guitar, rhythm guitar
- Rune Westberg – guitar
- Phil X – acoustic guitar, rhythm guitar

German Pops Orchestra

- Christiane Alber – violoncello
- Betty Bachofer – viola
- Lisa Barry – violin 1
- Monika Beck – violin 2
- Felix Brade – violoncello
- Alexander Brutsch – viola
- Kathrin Bscheidl – violin
- Friederike Faust – viola
- Natascha Klotschkoff – viola
- Johannes Krampen – violin 1
- Klaus Kulling – violin 1
- Klaus Marquardt – violin 2
- Constantin Meier – violoncello
- Marcin Niziol – viola
- Claudiu Rupa – violin 2
- Bernd Ruf – orchestra music director
- Michael Speth – violin 1
- Alex Uhl – double basso
- Ariane Volm – violin 2
- Ulrich Zimmer – orchestra contractor & leader

Children Choir

- Julian Babad
- Christopher James
- Michael O'Brien
- Victor Pineschi
- Jasper Randall – choir contractor
- Hale Thornhill-Wilson

Production

- Alex Arias – 2nd engineer, engineer
- Bettina Bertok – assistant
- Andrew Bollman – assistant mixing engineer
- Mark Dobson – pro tools editor, recording engineer
- Kevin Estrada – 2nd engineer
- Travis Kennedy – assistant mixing engineer
- Ryan Kern – 2nd engineer
- Mike Leisz – 2nd engineer, engineer
- Bob Ludwig – mastering
- Seth Morton – assistant mixing engineer
- Kelle Musgrove – production coordinator
- Justin Niebank – mixing engineer
- Tim Palmer – mixing engineer
- Cindi Peters – mix coordinator
- Matt Serletic – arranger, keyboards, piano, producer, programmer
- Doug Trantow – pro tools editor, programmer, recording engineer
- Adrian von Ripka – tonmeister
- Rune Westberg – producer (bonus track 14), recording engineer

Rokulus Strings

- Mojca Arnold – violin
- Ziga Cerar – violin
- Marijana Gregoric – violin
- Rok Golob – conductor and orchestrator
- Ursula Ivanus – acoustic cello
- Ajda Kralj – violin
- Marija Naversnik – violin
- Pavel Rakar – acoustic cello
- Marjeta Skrjanc – viola
- Tomaz Stular – contrabass
- Tamar Tasev – viola
- Nastja Znideric – violin
- Andreja Zupanc – violin

== Release history ==
List of release dates, showing region, formats, label, editions and reference
Region	Date	Format(s)	Label	Edition(s)	Ref.
Australia	June 24, 2011	CD; digital download	Sony Music Entertainment	Standard; deluxe	
United Kingdom	June 28, 2011	CD; digital download	RCA; 19	Standard; deluxe	
United States	June 28, 2011	CD; digital download	RCA; 19	Standard; deluxe	
