= Analog Heart =

Studio album by David Cook
- Released: May 6, 2006
- Genre: Alternative rock; post-grunge
- Length: 40:47
- Label: Self-released independently
- Producer: David Cook

David Cook chronology
Analog Heart (2006)	David Cook (2008)

Analog Heart is the debut solo studio album by American singer-songwriter David Cook. All songs on the album were written by him. Though originally released as an independent record on May 6, 2006, Analog Heart sales jumped during Cook's appearance on the seventh season of American Idol.

Analog Heart won the Urban Tulsa Weekly's "Absolute Best of Tulsa" award for "Best Locally Produced, Independent Album" in 2007. The album was chosen as the fourth-best CD released in 2006 by website Music Equals Life.

On April 18, 2008, Analog Heart was listed as the number one album for "Today's Top MP3 Albums" on Amazon.com, and David Cook was listed as number one for "Today's Top MP3 Artists". Soon thereafter, the album was removed from Amazon. The album sold 900 copies in its last week before being removed, and 300 the week before that. Prior to those two weeks, according to Nielsen SoundScan data, the album had not sold more than 5 copies in a single week.

In an article published on USAToday.com on May 23, 2008, Cook explained to reporters in a conference call why Analog Heart had to be removed from Amazon: "About midway through the season, I had to have the record pulled, obviously, for fairness issues on the show. And I got it pulled offline. But somebody, I have no idea who, reposted it on Amazon, so while that was going on, I was kind of at a loss. I talked to Amazon about getting it pulled, and there was a bunch of mass confusion about it. I'm extremely appreciative at how well it did. But I was kind of a pawn in that whole game." Nonetheless, other pre-Idol albums from Brooke White, Carly Smithson and Kristy Lee Cook remained on the market.

== Track listing ==
All songs written by David Cook

No.	Title	Length
1.	"Straight Ahead"	4:14
2.	"Don't Say a Word"	4:38
3.	"Fall Back Into Me"	3:36
4.	"The Truth"	4:48
5.	"Searchlights"	4:29
6.	"Porcelain"	3:38
7.	"Stitches"	4:04
8.	"Let Go"	3:20
9.	"Makeover"	3:38
10.	"Silver"	4:22

== Personnel ==
- David Cook - vocals, guitar, piano
- Josh Center - drums
- Neal Tiemann - guitar (Tracks 4, 5, 8)
- DTMB (Monty Anderson) - bass guitar (Tracks 3, 4, 5, 8, 10)
- Ben Hosterman - bass guitar (Tracks 2, 7)
- Andy Skib - backing vocals on "Silver" (Track 10)

=== Production personnel ===
- Produced by David Cook
- Engineered by Ben Hosterman (Tracks 1, 2, 4–10)
- Engineered by Andy Skib (Tracks 4, 5, 8)
- Engineered by Paul Johnson (Tracks 3, 10)
- Recorded at Powerstudio (Tulsa, OK), Rosewater Studios (Tulsa, OK), and Yellow Dog Studios (Austin, Texas)
- Photography by Wayne Hutcherson
- Art Concept, Design, and Layout by David Cook
