= David Cook (singer) =

American rock singer-songwriter

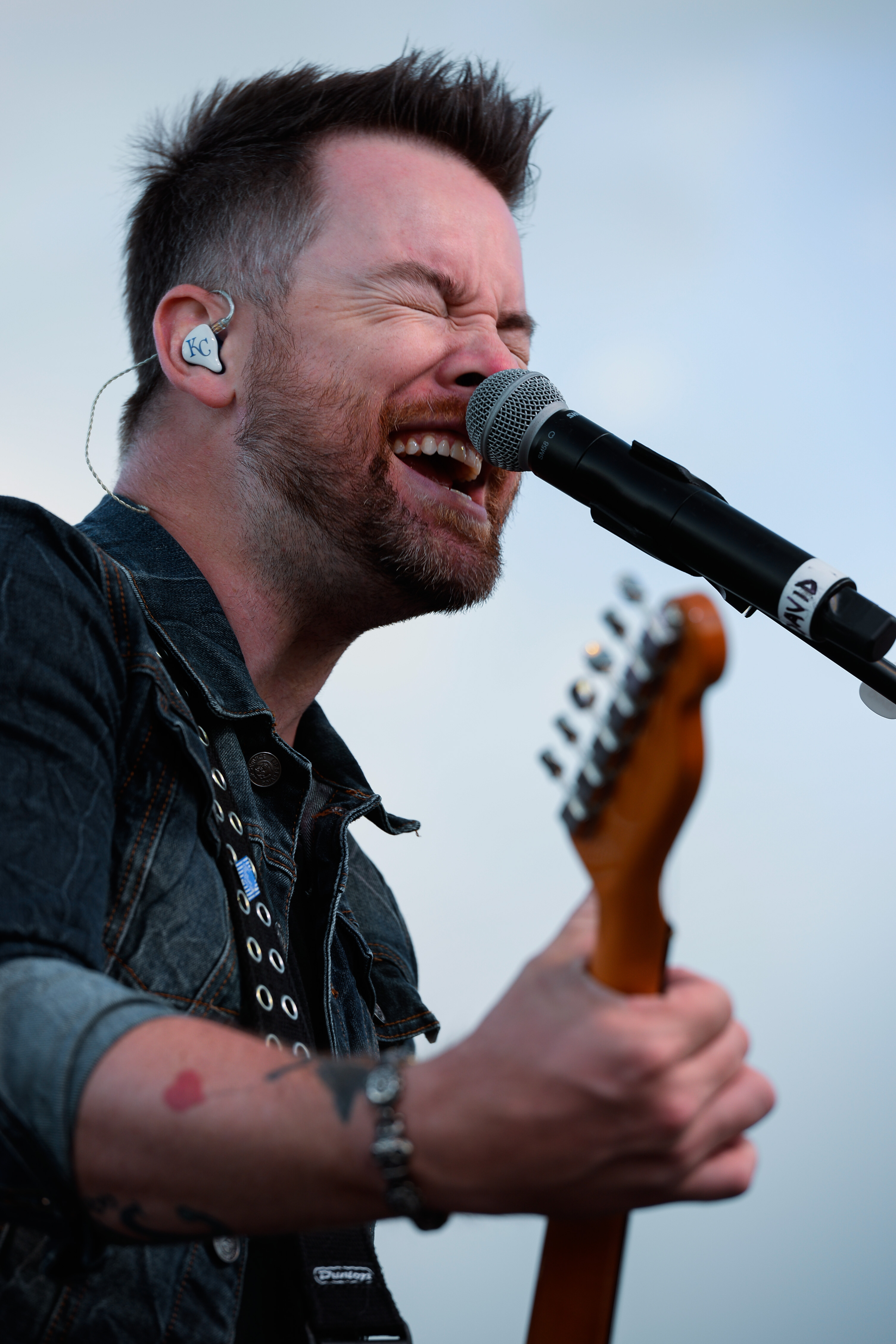
- Cook performing at Schriever Air Force Base in September 2016

Background information
- Born: David Roland Cook; December 20, 1982 (age 43); Houston, Texas, U.S.
- Origin: Blue Springs, Missouri, U.S.
- Genres: Rock; alternative rock; post-grunge; pop
- Occupations: Singer; songwriter; musician; actor
- Instruments: Vocals; guitar; bass; piano; drums
- Years active: 2001–present
- Labels: RCA; 19; XIX Recordings; Analog Heart Music
- Formerly of: Axium; Midwest Kings
- Spouse: Racheal Stump (m. 2015)
- Website: davidcookofficial.com

David Roland Cook (born December 20, 1982) is an American rock singer-songwriter. Cook rose to fame after winning the seventh season of American Idol in 2008.

Prior to Idol, Cook performed with multiple bands, releasing three studio albums and four live albums before releasing his first solo independent album, Analog Heart. After winning American Idol, he released his debut single "The Time of My Life", which entered the Billboard Hot 100 chart at number three and at number two on the Billboard Canadian Hot 100, selling over 1.4 million copies and being certified platinum by the RIAA. His major-label self-titled debut album was released on November 18, 2008, and has also since been certified platinum by the RIAA. The album produced two top twenty singles; "Light On" and "Come Back to Me". His second major album This Loud Morning was released on June 28, 2011. The album produced two singles; "The Last Goodbye" and "Fade into Me". This Quiet Night, Cook's first EP, was also released on June 28, 2011 and featured acoustic performances of select This Loud Morning album tracks.

After departing from RCA and releasing three stand-alone singles, Cook became an independent artist and released his first single "Criminals" for his fourth studio album Digital Vein, which was released on September 18, 2015, with the latter two ("Laying Me Low" and "Wait For Me") being featured on the album. The album produced two more singles: "Broken Windows" and "Heartbeat".

Cook released his second EP, Chromance, featuring a more pop-driven sound. Its lead single, "Gimme Heartbreak," was released to promote the EP. The EP entered the US Indie charts at number five. His third EP, The Looking Glass, was released on April 16, 2021.

== Early life ==
Cook was born in Houston, Texas, and raised in Blue Springs, Missouri. His parents are Beth Foraker and Stanley Cook. He is the middle of three brothers – the late Adam Cook being older and Andrew younger. He is of German, Irish, and English descent.

Cook's interest in music began at a young age. He began singing in second grade, when his elementary school music teacher, Mrs. Gentry, gave him a part in a school Christmas performance. He proceeded to perform in virtually every Christmas and PTA program. He received his first guitar, a Fender Stratocaster, at the age of 13. He also participated in choir and drama programs in middle school and high school. At Blue Springs South High School, he performed in musicals, including The Music Man, West Side Story, and Singin' in the Rain. In addition to this, he was an active member in the Blue Springs South High School National Forensics League (or NFL), where he qualified for the national tournament twice for Duo Interpretation, an event that relies on performance and interpretation of a literary work. He graduated from Blue Springs South High School in 2001.

He was also an avid baseball player (pitcher) during high school and once gave up a home run to Albert Pujols in an American Legion Baseball game. After an injury, he focused more on music. He earned a theater scholarship to the University of Central Missouri, but he abandoned theater after two semesters, graduating from the school in 2006 with a Bachelor of Fine Arts in graphic design. While in college, he was a member of Phi Sigma Kappa. After his college graduation, he relocated to Tulsa, Oklahoma, to pursue a career in music, telling his mother, "I just want to give myself until I'm 26 years old to get a job."

== Early music career ==
David Cook formed a band with his friend Bobby Kerr while at high school. The band was initially named Red Eye, later changed to Axium. He wrote his first song, "Red Hot", when he was fifteen. He was encouraged by Evan Sula-Goff of 8stops7 to make an album when he went to Cook's school to judge a contest, Mr. Jaguar, where David Cook and his band performed Guns N' Roses' "Paradise City". The band had some success when one of their songs, "Hold", was selected to be played in movie theaters across the country, and they were named one of the top 15 independent bands in the country by "Got Milk?" contest as well as the best Kansas City band in 2004. The band produced three studio albums – Matter of Time, Blindsided, and The Story Thus Far, as well as a number of live albums including Alive in Tulsa.

Axium, however, broke up in 2006 and David Cook moved to Tulsa where he joined Midwest Kings, a band he once opened for. He was the bassist for their EP Incoherent With Desire to Move On. Members of that band Andy Skib and Neal Tiemann later became part of David Cook's post-Idol band The Anthemic. He recorded and self-released a solo album Analog Heart in 2006. He had also recorded his second solo album (unreleased) prior to appearing on Idol, and was working as a bartender to support himself.

== American Idol ==
Cook originally did not plan to try out for the show. He went to the auditions in Omaha, Nebraska, initially to support his younger brother (who did not make it to Hollywood) and then, prompted by mother and brother when a show producer noticed him, David auditioned himself. He performed Bon Jovi's "Livin' On a Prayer" for his audition. For his first Hollywood audition, Cook performed "(Everything I Do) I Do It for You" by Bryan Adams, accompanying himself on acoustic guitar. On the second song in Hollywood, he sang "I'll Be" by Edwin McCain. Cook took advantage of the decision to allow contestants to play musical instruments. Besides his Hollywood audition, he also accompanied himself on electric guitar for his performances of "All Right Now", "Hello", "Day Tripper", "I'm Alive", "Baba O'Riley", "Dare You to Move", and "Dream Big", and on acoustic guitar for "Little Sparrow", "All I Really Need Is You", and "The World I Know". His white, left-handed Gibson Les Paul electric guitar has the letters "AC" on it; as Cook told TV Guide, "I have two brothers, Adam and Andrew. So, because of superstition, I put their initials on everything growing up." Starting from the Top 12-week, he also wore (and continued to wear throughout competition) an orange wristband to support a then-7-year-old fan, Lindsey Rose, with leukemia. Lindsey Rose is now many years recovered and perfectly healthy.

Another of Cook's performances, The Beatles' "Day Tripper", was credited to Whitesnake. Seattle-based band Doxology has claimed that Cook's performance of The Beatles' "Eleanor Rigby" was based on a version the band recorded over a year ago. On April 1, before performing his self-arranged rendition of Dolly Parton's "Little Sparrow" on American Idol, Cook told Ryan Seacrest in the interview session that his performance of "Eleanor Rigby" was based on Neil Zaza's and Doxology's versions. He also reiterated the credits of Whitesnake and Chris Cornell. Despite the controversy, critics praised Cook for choosing versions of songs that fit his vocal style. Cook's arrangements of "Happy Together", "Hello", "Little Sparrow", "Always Be My Baby", "All I Really Need Is You", "Baba O'Riley", "I Don't Want to Miss a Thing", "Dream Big" and "The World I Know" were original arrangements.

Cook won the seventh season of American Idol on May 21, 2008, receiving 56 percent of the votes, with 12 million votes over David Archuleta, the runner-up. Cook then sang "The Time of My Life", the winning song of the 2008 American Idol Songwriter's Competition. During the final show, identical commercials promoting Guitar Hero featured Cook and fellow finalist Archuleta mimicked the Tom Cruise scene from Risky Business where he dances in his underwear playing an air guitar.

=== Performances ===
American Idol season 7 performances and results
Week #	Theme	Song choice	Original artist	Order #	Result
Audition	N/A	"Livin' on a Prayer"	Bon Jovi	N/A	Advanced
Hollywood	N/A	"(Everything I Do) I Do It for You"	Bryan Adams	N/A	Advanced
Top 50	N/A	"I'll Be"	Edwin McCain	N/A	Advanced
Top 24 (12 Men)	1960s	"Happy Together"	The Turtles	3	Safe
Top 20 (10 Men)	1970s	"All Right Now"	Free	9	Safe
Top 16 (8 Men)	1980s	"Hello"	Lionel Richie	6	Safe
Top 12	Lennon-McCartney	"Eleanor Rigby"	The Beatles	6	Safe
Top 11	The Beatles	"Day Tripper"	The Beatles	6	Safe
Top 10	Year They Were Born	"Billie Jean"	Michael Jackson	10	Safe
Top 9	Dolly Parton	"Little Sparrow"	Dolly Parton	2	Safe
Top 8	Inspirational Songs	"Innocent"	Our Lady Peace	5	Safe
Top 7	Mariah Carey	"Always Be My Baby"	Mariah Carey	6	Safe
Top 6	Andrew Lloyd Webber	"The Music of the Night"	Michael Crawford	6	Safe
Top 5	Neil Diamond	"I'm Alive" "All I Really Need Is You"	Neil Diamond	2; 7	Safe
Top 4	Rock and Roll Hall of Fame	"Hungry Like the Wolf" "Baba O'Riley"	Duran Duran; The Who	1; 5	Safe
Top 3	Judge's Choice (Simon Cowell); Contestant's Choice; Producer's Choice	"The First Time Ever I Saw Your Face" "Dare You to Move" "I Don't Want to Miss a Thing"	Peggy Seeger; Switchfoot; Aerosmith	3; 6; 9	Safe
Finale	Clive Davis's Choice; New Song; Contestant's Choice	"I Still Haven't Found What I'm Looking For" "Dream Big" "The World I Know"	U2; David Cook; Collective Soul	1; 3; 5	Winner

== Post-Idol career ==
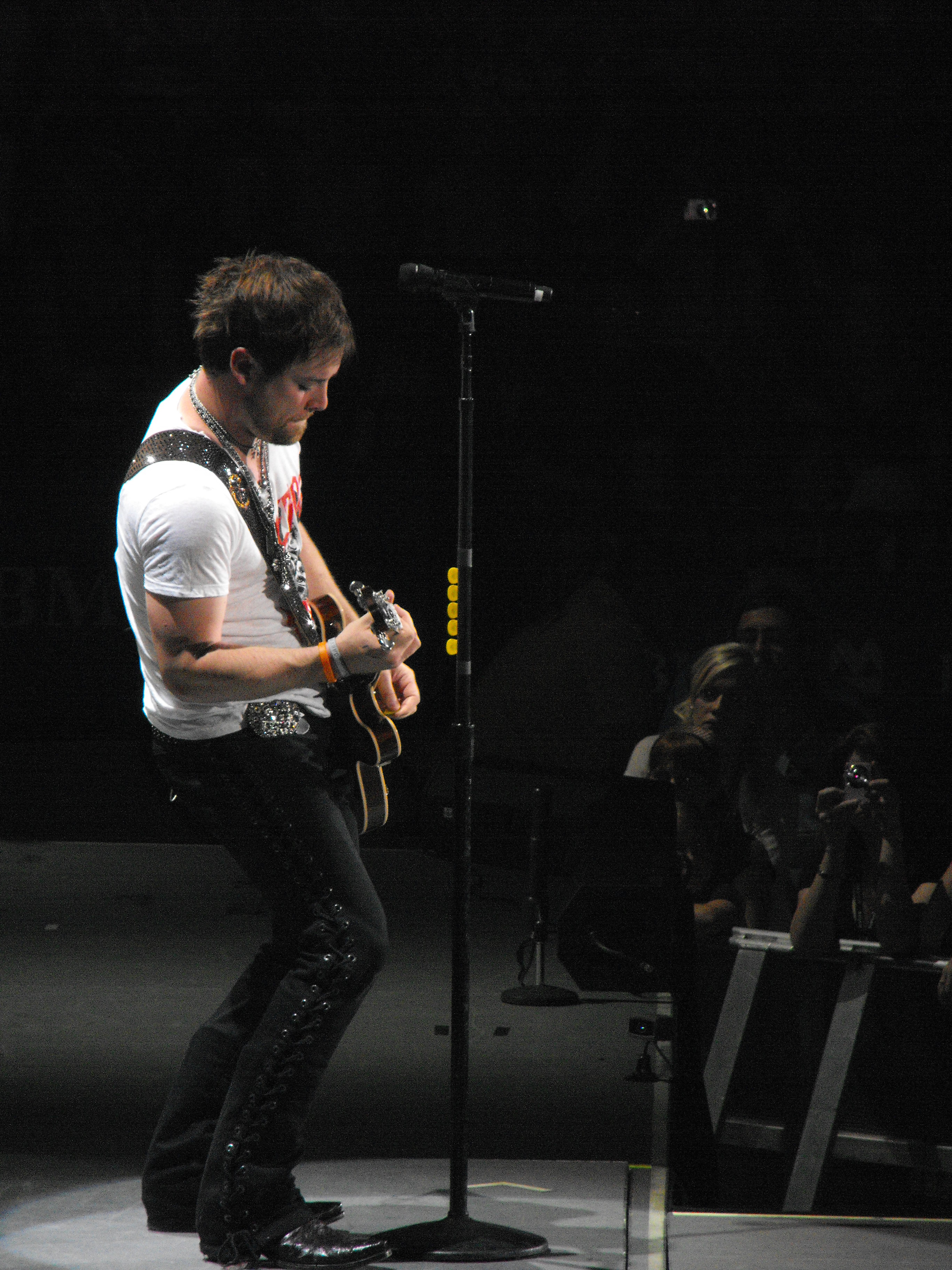
Cook performing during the American Idols Live! Tour 2008

A week following Cook's American Idol victory, in the Billboard chart week ending May 25, 2008, Cook broke several Billboard chart records. Most notable was his record-shattering feat of having 11 songs debut on the Hot 100 that week, beating the previous record set by Miley Cyrus (Hannah Montana) in 2006 when she had six songs debut on the chart. Cook's first single, "The Time of My Life" led the pack, debuting at number three on the Hot 100. Cook's eleven charting songs also gave him the most songs by one artist on the Hot 100 of any week in the Nielsen SoundScan era (which began in 1991), and the most of any era since The Beatles placed 14 songs on the chart the week of April 11, 1964. In addition, that same week Cook also broke the record for the most debuts on Billboard's Hot Digital Songs chart, where he placed 14 debut entries, the record for which was previously six, set by Bon Jovi in 2007. Cook's 17 entries had a combined total of 944,000 digital downloads in the first week of selling.

Cook also signed an endorsement deal with Skechers that ran through December 2009.

Cook's photo was also featured on the cover of The World Almanac and Book of Facts 2009, along with President Barack Obama and Senator John McCain.

=== 2008–2009: Major label debut and David Cook ===
Cook worked with Espionage, Ed Roland (Collective Soul), Zac Maloy (The Nixons), Jason Wade (Lifehouse), Neal Tiemann (the Midwest Kings), Kevin Griffin (Better Than Ezra), Chantal Kreviazuk, and Raine Maida (Our Lady Peace) on his self-titled, major label debut album. The album was produced by Rob Cavallo. On Ryan Seacrest's morning show, On Air, of KIIS-FM on September 5, 2008, the singer revealed that the CD release date would be November 18, 2008.

The first single released from the album, "Light On," premiered as an AOL Exclusive on September 23, 2008, and debuted at No. 17 on the Billboard Hot 100 for the week of October 18, 2008. The single was certified platinum on January 20, 2010. This was followed by a dual release of "Come Back to Me" and "Bar-ba-sol," with "Come Back to Me" being released to HAC radio stations and "Bar-ba-sol" to rock radio. The music video for "Come Back to Me" was released on April 4, 2009. His debut album was certified platinum by the Recording Industry Association for America (RIAA) for sales exceeding one-million units in January 2009. He was presented with his plaque while recording a performance that was aired during the April 1, 2009, episode of American Idol.

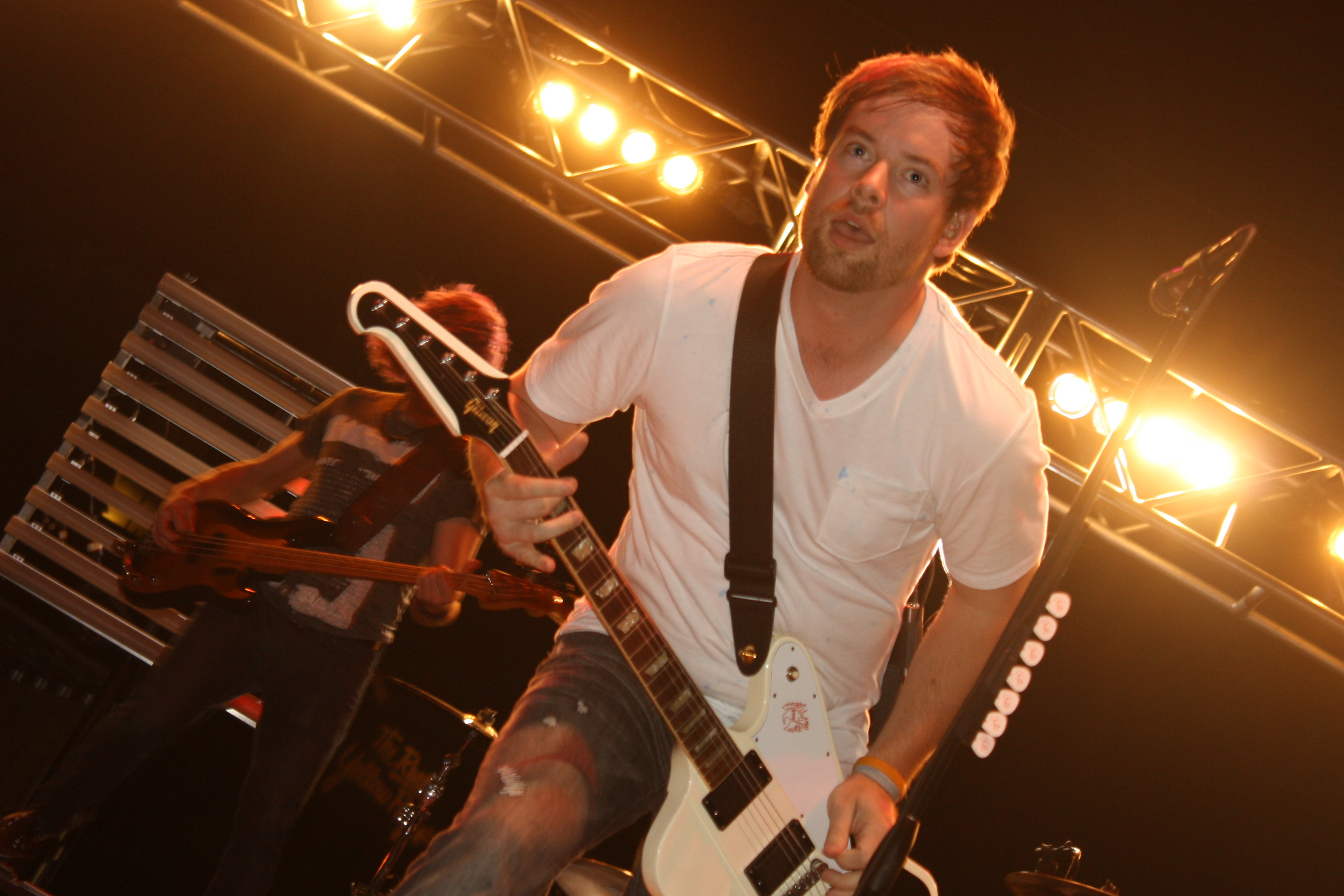
David Cook at Moody Gardens in Galveston, Texas, as part of the Declaration tour

Cook had earlier announced via his myspace blog that two former bandmates from Midwest Kings (MWK) would join his band: Neal Tiemann as the lead guitar player, and Andy Skib on rhythm guitar and keyboard. Other members who joined later were Joey Clement (replaced later by Monty Anderson) on bass guitar, and Kyle Peek on drums and backing vocals. The Declaration Tour began on February 13, 2009, in Tallahassee, Florida, and was originally set to end in Tulsa, Oklahoma, on April 25, 2009. The tour however was extended twice – the first time through May 31, 2009, and then again starting from June 18, 2009, in Del Mar, California, and finally ending December 1, 2009, in Charlotte, North Carolina, after a total of 153 shows. On August 23, 2009, in an interview and at his concert in Yakima, Washington, Cook announced that the band would be known as The Anthemic.

=== 2010–2011: This Loud Morning ===
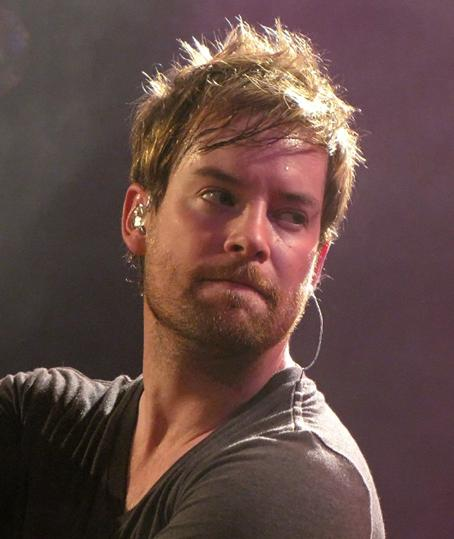
Cook performing at Toad's Place, New Haven, Connecticut in September 2010

Cook began to concentrate working on this his second album after his first major tour, The Declaration Tour, concluded in December 2009. While on the tour, he put down some riffs and lyrical ideas, and started song-writing as a band towards the end of the tour. In an interview with Idolatry's Michael Slezak on February 8, 2010, Cook revealed that he was hard at work on his second album. He had been collaborating with Raine Maida and Chantal Kreviazuk, Matt Squire, Gregg Wattenberg, John Rzeznik, Sam Hollander and Dave Katz, Claude Kelly, Brian Howes, David Hodges, Tommy Henriksen, Steven Van Zandt, Kevin Griffin, Zac Maloy, Ryan Tedder, Jim Irvin, Jamie Houston, Ryan Star & Julian Emery and Max Martin. Besides that, he also collaborated with members of his band, The Anthemic – Neal Tiemann and Andy Skib. In an April interview with HitQuarters – recorded in March – the producer-songwriter Steve Mac said that Cook had recently visited his Rokstone Studios in London where together with Mac he had also been writing with Savan Kotecha and Andrew Frampton. He had hoped initially that a single would be ready for release in April 2010 and the album that summer. However, a producer for the album was not announced until May, and recording started in June that year with producer Matt Serletic at the helm. On March 31, 2011, Cook tweeted that the title of his new single would be The Last Goodbye and debuted on April 19, 2011. This Loud Morning was released on June 28, 2011. He has also stated that at the beginning his goal was to make an album that "really, really pushed the concept of dynamic".

Cook toured in support of This Loud Morning with a 2011 Fall Tour, co-headlining with Gavin DeGraw and with Carolina Liar in support, for 22 shows across 15 states beginning October 9, 2011, in State College, Pennsylvania, and ending November 10, 2011, in Athens, Georgia. Cook's second single, "Fade into Me", was released to coincide with the tour. Cook tweeted that there would be "more dates/info to come" In this tour, Devin Bronson replaced Neal Tiemann as the lead guitarist.

=== 2012–2016: Label change, independent, and Digital Vein ===
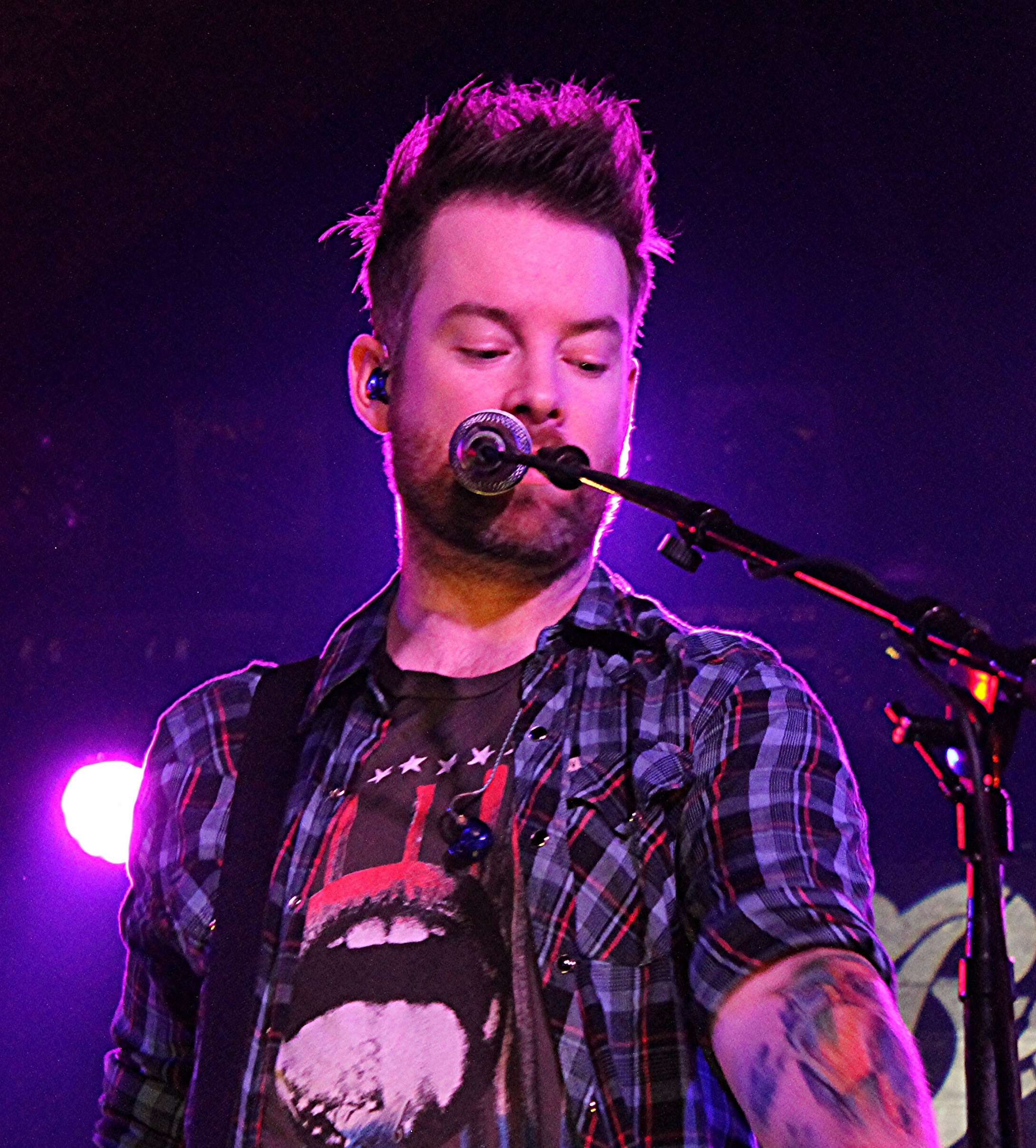
David Cook at Belly Up Tavern in San Diego, California in 2015.

On May 10, 2012, Cook performed a new song, "The Last Song I'll Write for You" on the eleventh season of American Idol. Before the performance, Cook confirmed to Shirley Halperin of the Hollywood Reporter that he was without a recording contract, having departed from RCA, and was self-releasing "The Last Song I'll Write for You". On April 30, 2013, Cook released a new single, "Laying Me Low", through XIX Recordings, the record label of American Idol creator Simon Fuller, although Cook shortly departed from Fuller's label.

Cook co-penned country music singer David Nail's 2014 single, "Kiss You Tonight" from his album I'm a Fire. On March 24, 2015, Cook signed a publishing deal with Warner/Chappell Music.

Cook's move to Nashville saw his newfound role as producer of his fourth album, often citing his move as the source of creativity. He worked with previous songwriters like Zac Maloy, Kevin Griffin, David Hodges, and Andy Skib (who also contributed as engineer). Cook also collaborated with Jerry Flowers, Earth to Andy members Andy Waldeck and Chris Reardon (with Reardon also serving as co-producer on one track – "Laying Me Low"), local Nashville writers Blair Daly and Chad Carlson, former bandmate Devin Bronson, and Steven Miller. "Criminals" was the first official single from the album released on July 31, 2015. Digital Vein was released on September 18, 2015, through Cook's own independent label, Analog Heart Music.

Cook promoted the album on the Digital Vein Tour throughout late 2015 and early 2016. The first half of the tour, with opening act Andrew Ripp, consisted of 33 shows in 24 states, beginning on September 30, 2015, in Phoenix, Arizona, and ending on November 21, 2015, in Tulsa, Oklahoma. In this tour, Daniel Damico replaced Andy Skib and Devin Bronson as the lead guitarist and keyboardist, drummer Adam Reidelbach replaced Nick Adams, and Andy Wildrick replaced Monty Anderson as the bass guitarist.

His second single "Broken Windows" was released on February 22, 2016, and coincided with the second half of the tour. Featuring opening act Tony Lucca, the run consisted of 18 shows in 14 states, beginning on February 23, 2016, in Chattanooga, Tennessee, and ending on March 19, 2016, in Oklahoma City, Oklahoma.

=== 2017–2021: Chromance and The Looking Glass ===
Following his independent album Digital Vein, Cook began work on new material, shifting towards a more pop-oriented sound while maintaining rock elements. On March 27, 2017, Cook teased a thirty-second clip on social media with the quote "#gimmeheartbreak", indicating his new single, "Gimme Heartbreak" would be released on June 23, 2017.

On November 13, 2017, Cook announced the EP Chromance through a PledgeMusic campaign, which funded its production and allowed fans to access exclusive updates and pre-order content. A day prior to the EP's release, Cook held a special release event at The Basement East in Nashville, Tennessee.

Chromance was released independently on February 16, 2018, featuring five tracks co-written with collaborators including Tim Bruns, Steve Rusch, and Nathan Paul Chapman, and a cover of "Another Day in Paradise" by Phil Collins. It entered at number 173 in the Billboard 200 chart, and at number 5 in the US Indie chart. The second single, "Ghost Magnetic", was released on March 1, 2018, along with an official lyric video.

From October 25 to November 20, 2018, Cook embarked on Acoustic Tour.

On October 26, 2018, Cook released his stand-alone single, "Death of Me."

On June 26, 2020, he released his single, "Reds Turn Blue," from The Looking Glass. In an interview with People, Cook explains that the title is a reference to the manic highs and lows of anxiety and states that the song is "kind of a letter from my anxiety to me," after publicly announcing that he had been diagnosed with an anxiety disorder two years after winning American Idol. On December 4, 2020, he released the second single, "Strange World", from the EP. Cook released his third single, "Fire", from the EP on March 19, 2021. Cook released his third EP, The Looking Glass, on April 16, 2021.

=== 2022–present: Upcoming EPs ===
On April 29, 2022, Cook released his stand-alone single, "TABOS," (an acronym for "This'll all be over soon" from the song's chorus).

On July 19, 2024, Cook released a new single, "Dead Weight". On November 22, 2024 he released a charity single, "This Time Tomorrow 16".

On February 18, 2025, Cook announced that he would release multiple EPs. The first EP, The Hero, was released on September 19, 2025, and included the single "Dead Weight", and two new songs; "Rendezvous" and "Disappear".

== Other activities ==
=== Acting career ===
Cook made his Broadway debut playing Charlie Price, in Kinky Boots on April 3, 2018, and would play a limited run through May 5. Cook returned to Kinky Boots for a second limited run starting July 17 to September 9, 2018.

=== Philanthropy ===
People reported on March 31, 2009, that David was canceling dates on his current tour due to "family matters". Cook's elder brother, Adam, had been diagnosed with brain cancer since 1998 and died on May 2, 2009. On May 3, 2009, at the "Race for Hope" in Washington, D.C., Cook announced the death of his brother during the awards speech, and stated that he "couldn't imagine being anywhere else right now." He finished the 5k with a time of 28 minutes. His team raised $136,376.16 for the cause. Donations were accepted through September 30, 2009. On the finale of the 8th season of American Idol, Cook sang his song "Permanent" in honor of his brother. Audio of the performance was made available on iTunes, and the proceeds from the sale of it were put toward brain cancer research.

=== Other performances ===
Cook appeared at the 2008 Glamour magazine Women of the Year Awards as a guest of Mary Steenburgen to surprise honoree Hillary Clinton, a fan of American Idol. He sang one of Clinton's favorite songs, "The First Time Ever I Saw Your Face", which he also sang during the Top 3-week on Idol.

Cook appeared in several promotions for the November 1, 2008, episode of Saturday Night Live, hosted by Ben Affleck. Cook performed two songs on the program, the first "Light On" and the second "Declaration".

In 2009, Cook performed songs from his debut album for the troops during a USO tour, where he was able to visit seven bases (including Camp Liberty, Camp Phoenix, and Camp Taji in Iraq). Cook has since had the honor of performing for military personnel and their families at more than 40 military installations around the world with the USO, Armed Forces Entertainment, Navy Entertainment, and Air Force Entertainment.

On August 11, 2009, Cook performed "Starseed" with Canadian alternative rock band, Our Lady Peace at the House of Blues in Dallas, Texas.

On February 18, 2010, Cook performed with the original line-up of his band, Midwest Kings (which included Neal Tiemann and Andy Skib), in Tulsa, Oklahoma, performing songs from the band's discography.

Since his American Idol win, Cook attended many of the show's promotional events. On February 12, 2009, Cook appeared on the morning news program, Good Morning America and talked about Walt Disney World Resort's new attraction, The American Idol Experience, where he performed "Light On" and covered "Go Your Own Way" with fellow winner Carrie Underwood. He and all the other six winners received a mic-shaped statue from the creator of the franchise, Simon Fuller to honor them for winning the competition. On August 7, 2009, Cook performed the Fleetwood Mac hit "Little Lies" with American Idol season 8 winner Kris Allen and runner-up Adam Lambert on ABC's Good Morning America's Summer Concert Series in Central Park. Cook performed "Lie" in a Christmas TV variety special hosted by Carrie Underwood.

Cook also made numerous returns to American Idol. On April 1, 2009, Cook performed "Come Back To Me" and was presented with his Platinum Album for David Cook (album). On May 20, 2009, Cook performed "Permanent" during the finale of eighth season in honor of his late brother Adam, where proceeds from the live single went to Accelerate Brain Cancer Cure (ABC2). During the March 17, 2010, episode of American Idol, Cook sang the Rolling Stones song "Jumpin' Jack Flash". On April 21, 2010, Cook made an appearance on Idol Gives Back. On March 7, 2011, Cook released the send-off song for the tenth season, the Simple Minds song "Don't You (Forget About Me)", played upon elimination and returned on May 24, 2011, to perform the song live. He later performed "The Last Goodbye" on the stage on April 21, 2011. He returned in the eleventh season to perform "The Last Song I'll Write for You" and once more in the twelfth season to sing "Laying Me Low". Cook mentored the top 8 finalists during "Songs from the 1980s" week in the thirteenth season. He mentored once more with two semi-finalists during the fifteenth season, dueting with C.J. Johnson on "The World I Know" and Olivia Rox on his own song "Light On". On April 7, 2016, he returned again, performing a David Bowie medley in tribute with fellow winners Kris Allen, Lee DeWyze, Phillip Phillips, and Nick Fradiani. During Hollywood Week of twentieth season, Cook returned to mentor contestants in the rock genre and later returned to duet with Kris Allen as part of that seasons "The Great Idol Reunion" special, which aired on May 2, 2022.

== Personal life ==
In May 2008, Cook asked Season 2 American Idol alum and TV Guide Network correspondent Kimberly Caldwell for a dinner date while on the red carpet before the show's seventh-season finale. During a radio interview with XL 106.7 on October 13, 2008, Cook revealed that he and Caldwell were "still seeing each other." In a November 2008 interview with People magazine, Cook said his relationship with Caldwell was a "nice break from the chaos" of post-Idol fame. They ended their relationship in December 2008.

Cook married longtime girlfriend, Racheal Stump, in a private ceremony in Nashville on June 20, 2015.

== Influences ==
His musical influences include Our Lady Peace, Alice in Chains, Big Wreck, Pearl Jam, Bon Jovi, Chris Cornell, The Goo Goo Dolls, Switchfoot, Collective Soul, and Michael Jackson. Immediately after winning American Idol, Cook was asked backstage by Entertainment Weekly who his top five favorite bands were. Our Lady Peace and Big Wreck were on this short list, as well as the Foo Fighters, Jimmy Eat World and 8stops7.

== Backing band ==
Current members

- Jeffrey B. Scott – lead guitar, keyboards, backing vocals (2016–present)
- Thomas Branch – drums / percussion (2019–present)
- Mike Ball – bass guitar (2017–2022, 2023–present)

Former members

- Joey Clement – bass guitar (2008–2009)
- Neal Tiemann – lead guitar (2008–2011)
- Kyle Peek – drums, backing vocals (2008–2011)
- Andy Skib – rhythm guitar, keyboards, backing vocals (2008–2014)
- Devin Bronson – lead guitar (2011–2014)
- Monty Anderson – bass guitar (2009–2015)
- Nick Adams – drums (2012–2015)
- Daniel Damico – lead guitar, keyboards (2014–2016)
- Andy Wildrick – bass guitar (2015–2016)
- Joshua Zarbo – bass guitar (2016)
- Adam Reidelbach – drums (2015–2016)
- Donovan White - bass guitar (2022-2023)
- Jack Ivins - drums, bass guitar (2023-2024)

== Discography ==
Studio albums

- Analog Heart (2006)
- David Cook (2008)
- This Loud Morning (2011)
- Digital Vein (2015)

EPs

- This Quiet Night (2011)
- Chromance (2018)
- The Looking Glass (2021)
- The Hero (2025)

== Tours ==
Headlining

- The Declaration Tour (2009)
- This Loud Tour (2011)
- Fall Tour (2013)
- Navy Entertainment/AFE Tour (2013–2014)
- Winter Tour (2015)
- Digital Vein Tour (2015–2016)
- Summer Tour (2017)
- Acoustic Tour (2018)
- Summer Sessions/Fall Sounds Tour (2019)
- The Looking Glass Tour (2021)
- Summer/Fall Tour (2022)
- Summer/Fall Tour (2023)
- Scars Open, Eyes Shut Tour (2024)

Co-headlining

- American Idols LIVE! Tour 2008
- 2011 Tour with Gavin DeGraw
- Dave & Kris Go To Europe Acoustic Tour (2021) with Kris Allen

== Theatre ==
Year	Production	Role	Dates	Location	Category
2018	Kinky Boots	Charlie Price	April 3 – May 5, 2018	Al Hirschfeld Theatre	Broadway
2018	Kinky Boots	Charlie Price	July 17 – September 9, 2018	Al Hirschfeld Theatre	Broadway

== Awards and nominations ==
Year	Presenter	Award	Result
2006	URBY Awards	Best Independent Album - "Analog Heart"	Won
2008	Teen Choice Awards	Choice TV: Male Reality/Variety Star	Won
2008	Teen Choice Awards	Best Presenter (Post Show)	Nominated
2008	The New Music Awards	Top 40 Male Artist of the Year	Won
2009	Teen Choice Awards	Breakout Artist	Nominated
2009	Teen Choice Awards	Album (Male Artist)	Nominated
2009	Nashville Music Awards	Song of the Year – "Time of My Life"	Won
2009	The New Music Awards	Top 40 Male Artist of the Year	Won
2013	Dahsyatnya Awards	Outstanding Guest Star	Nominated

== See also ==
- List of Idols winners
