= Axium =

American rock band

- Also known as: Red Eye
- Origin: Kansas City, Missouri, United States
- Genres: Hard rock, post-grunge
- Years active: 1999–2006
- Past members: David Cook; Bobby Kerr; Jeff Shrout; Travis Grogan; Nathan Russell; Keith Crawford; Ryan Butler; Jerron Nichols; Matt McLaughlin; Drew Foss; Anthony Mazzarella

Axium was a Missouri-based band once headed by American Idol season 7 winner David Cook. Their sound was described as Alice in Chains meets Tantric.

== History ==
David Cook formed Axium in his junior year of high school alongside drummer Bobby Kerr. The band was originally called Red Eye, but they changed it because it sounded too much like Pink Eye. The first performance as Axium (actually spelled Axiom at the time) consisted of Cook, Kerr, as well as Matt McLaughlin on guitar and Drew Foss on bass. Foss was soon replaced by Anthony Mazzarella, and this lineup recorded an unnamed 5 song demo. Cook and Kerr then went through a few bass players in search of the perfect band, but these two always stuck together. It was in May 2001 that Cook and Kerr finally found Jeff Shrout. In June 2004 they recruited Travis Grogan on bass in support of their final studio album, The Story Thus Far. Since then, Bobby Kerr left the band in 2005, followed by David Cook a little over a year later when Axium mutually disbanded in 2006. They performed their last show in Kansas City.

Today, Jeff Shrout is playing lead guitar and writing songs for his band, Sleep Another Year. On bass guitar, is Travis Grogan (former bassist for Axium.) They recently released the EP "We Won't Ask." Bobby Kerr has recorded two Rat Pack inspired albums since 2006.

== Success ==
Axium played with notable acts like 8Stops7, Caroline's Spine, Maroon 5, Fountains of Wayne, and Smash Mouth.

One of the band's songs, "Hold," was picked up by AMC Theatres Movie Tunes and was played before previews on over 20,000 screens nationwide. Axium was also named one of the top 15 independent bands in the country in the "Got Milk?" independent band contest, and it was chosen as the best band in Kansas City in 2004.

== Discography ==
=== Studio albums ===
- Matter of Time (2002)
- Blindsided (2003)
- The Story Thus Far (2004)

=== Live albums ===
- Alive in Tulsa (2004)
- Cain's Ballroom Recordings (2003)

Personnel: David Cook (vocals, guitar); Bobby Kerr (drums); Jerron Nichols (bass); Jeff Shrout (guitar); guest vocals on ‘Feed Your Ego’ – remix by: Lyrycyst and Godz Disciple
Track list

1. Feed Your Ego – (Cook/Shrout)
2. Hold – (Cook/Shrout)
3. Testament – (Cook/Shrout)
4. Leave Behind – (Cook/Shrout)
5. Thought You Knew – (Cook/Shrout)
6. Just in Case – (Cook/Shrout)
7. Feed Your Ego (remix) – (Cook/Shrout)
8. Why Do You Care? (hidden track) – (Cook/Shrout)
- Live @ Fishbonz (2004)

Personnel: David Cook (vocals, guitar); Bobby Kerr (drums); Ryan Butler (bass); Jeff Shrout (guitar)
Track list

1. Testament – (Cook/Shrout)
2. Clean Break – (Cook/Shrout)
3. Begin the End – (Butler/Cook)
4. Whipped – (Butler/Cook)
5. Rate (Something I'm Not) – (Butler/Cook)
6. Hold – (Cook/Shrout)
7. Holding Court – (Cook/Shrout)
8. Creep (Radiohead cover)
9. Thought You Knew – (Cook/Shrout)
10. Freak of the Week (cover)
11. Somber – (Cook/McLaughlin)
12. Truth is a Gun – (Cook/Shrout)
13. Uncovered – (Cook/Shrout)
- Welcome to the Funeral (live at The Hurricane) (2006)

Last show performed by the band in Kansas City and the recordings not officially released.
Personnel: David Cook (vocals, guitar); Travis Grogan (bass); Nathan Russell (drums); Jeff Shrout (guitar)
Track list

1. Welcome to the Funeral – (Cook)
2. Clean Break – (Cook/Shrout)
3. Uncovered – (Cook/Shrout)
4. AC – (Cook/Shrout)
5. Merch for Sale – (Cook)
6. Pecking Order – (Cook/Shrout)
7. Creep (Radiohead cover)
8. Wavelength (Cook)
9. Hold – (Cook/Shrout)
10. Callout – (Cook/Shrout)
11. Truth is a Gun – (Cook/Shrout)
