= Digital Vein =

Studio album by David Cook
- Released: September 18, 2015
- Recorded: 2013–15
- Genre: Rock; pop rock
- Length: 45:03 (Standard Edition); 57:04 (Deluxe Edition)
- Label: Analog Heart · INgrooves
- Producer: David Cook; Chris Reardon

David Cook chronology
This Loud Morning (2011)	Digital Vein (2015)	Chromance (2018)

Singles from David Cook
- 1. "Criminals" Released: July 31, 2015; 2. "Broken Windows" Released: February 22, 2016; 3. "Heartbeat" Released: March 25, 2016

Digital Vein is the fourth studio album by American singer-songwriter David Cook. It was released on September 18, 2015, through Cook's Analog Heart Music. The album features tracks co-written by Cook along with well-known songwriters such as Blair Daly, Zac Maloy, Kevin Griffin, Chad Carlson and David Hodges. Digital Vein is Cook's first studio album since he parted ways with RCA Records in 2012. The album was distributed through a deal with INgrooves Music Group.

Professional ratings
Review scores
Source	Rating
Allmusic	3.5/5 stars

== Background ==
Cook began work on his third post-American Idol album in 2012 after parting ways with RCA and relocating to Nashville, Tennessee. Cook stated that working in Nashville opened him up creatively to trying different things and was unsure about whether he would make another record but he decided to write songs, have fun and to see what happens. Digital Vein was recorded in Cook's home studio, where he worked with his longtime friend Andy Skib, who engineered, and the rhythm section from his touring band, playing the bulk of the parts himself. Cook stated that “The whole thing was an experiment to see if (A) I could make a record this way, and (B) if I could enjoy doing it this way. I’m a control freak, and to have this level of control has been empowering. It was definitely a different process for me, but I can’t recall ever having more fun making a record.”

On October 25, 2014, Cook tweeted a photo of himself in the studio and on October 27, 2014, Cook tweeted "So stoked to be sharing this new music with you. Here we go!" along with a link to a new song snippet with the words coming soon.

On May 20, 2015, Cook announced that his upcoming studio album would be made available for pre-order on PledgeMusic. Cook stated that he was "beyond excited" to be working with PledgeMusic and was "intrigued by the opportunity that Pledge offers in bringing fans into the process and partnering with them to bring this record to life."

The album's name, Digital Vein, and the track list for the standard edition were revealed on June 23, 2015. On June 26, 2015, the track list for the deluxe edition was released.

== Album title ==
The album initially had the working title, Mirror Mirror. On the decision to name the album Digital Vein, Cook said, "My last independent record, back in 2006, was Analog Heart, and after my major-label journey, with circumstances being what they are, this record is certainly a progression. I don’t think it’s very much like Analog Heart at all, but the process of putting it together was similar in the sense that I worked with a very small team, and I put a lot of myself into every aspect of it. It felt like a throwback in that regard, so I wanted the two records to be connected, if only in name.”

== Reception ==
=== Critical ===
Stephen Thomas Erlewine of AllMusic gave the album 3.5 out of 5 stars stating that "if it's unlikely Cook could bring this brand of mid-2000s mainstream rock into the Top 40 in 2015, he at least delivers an album that satisfies." Markos Papadatos of Digital Journal gave the album an 'A' rating, stating that "he is able to convey a wide spectrum of raw emotions with ease through his sincere storytelling."

=== Commercial ===
The album debuted at No. 35 on Billboard 200, No. 22 on Top Album Sales, No. 8 on Independent Albums and No. 7 on Internet Albums, with 11,000 sold on its debut week.

== Promotion ==
To promote the album, Cook posted video updates, sneak peaks of the new music, photos and other things on his PledgeMusic page.

== Singles ==
"Criminals" was released on July 31, 2015 and serves as the lead single from the album. Cook described the song as "lyrically ... a modern-day Bonnie and Clyde, young love against the world," and that it serves as a good synopsis for the record. The song was serviced to American hot adult contemporary radio on September 21, 2015.

"Broken Windows" was released and serviced to American hot adult contemporary radio on February 22, 2016 as the album's second single.

"Heartbeat" was released as a single on March 25, 2016. He performed the song on the fifteenth season finale of American Idol.

=== Other songs ===
"Laying Me Low" was released on April 30, 2013 through XIX Recordings, the record label of American Idol creator Simon Fuller. The song charted at number 36 on the Billboard Pop Digital Songs sales chart.

"Wait for Me" was released independently through Cook's label imprint Analog Heart Music on November 17, 2014.

An acoustic version of "Carry You" was released as a digital single from an acoustic EP that's only available on PledgeMusic. It was used as the season premiere of A&E’s Intervention on March 6, 2016.

== Track listing ==
No.	Title	Writer(s)	Length
1.	"Heartbeat"	David Cook; Andy Waldeck; Chris Reardon	3:36
2.	"Criminals"	Cook; Blair Daly	3:38
3.	"Broken Windows"	Cook; Zac Maloy; Jerry Flowers	3:03
4.	"Laying Me Low"	Cook; Reardon; Waldeck	3:39
5.	"Better Than Me"	Chase Foster	3:47
6.	"Carry You"	Cook; Daly	4:27
7.	"From Here to Zero"	Cook; Maloy	3:43
8.	"Kiss & Tell"	Cook; Waldedck; Andy Skib	3:24
9.	"Wait for Me"	Cook; Chad Carlson	3:49
10.	"I'm Gonna Love You"	Cook; Waldeck; Skib	4:17
11.	"Wicked Game"	Chris Isaak	3:45
12.	"Home Movies (Over Your Shoulder)"	Cook; Kevin Griffin	3:55

Deluxe edition
No.	Title	Writer(s)	Length
13.	"Where Do We Go"	Cook; Waldeck; Skib	4:01
14.	"Firing Squad"	Cook; David Hodges; Steven Miller	3:55
15.	"But You Won’t"	Cook; Skib	4:25

Walmart Exclusive
No.	Title	Writer(s)	Length
13.	"We're Not In This Alone"	Cook; Skib; Bronson	4:36
14.	"Secret Garden"	Bruce Springsteen	4:04
15.	"Eyes on You"	Cook; Waldeck; Reardon	3:30

== Personnel ==
Credits from AllMusic.

Vocals

- David Cook – primary artist
- Nick Gibson – vocals
- Andy Skib – vocals
- Jennie Skib – vocals

Production

- Chad Carlson – composer
- David Cook – composer, producer, programming
- Blair Daly – composer
- Jerry Flowers – composer
- Chase Foster – composer
- Nick Gibson – technician
- Kevin Griffin – composer
- Chris Isaak – composer
- David Hodges – composer
- Zac Maloy – composer
- Steven Miller – composer
- Joe Palmaccio – mastering
- Chris Reardon – composer, producer, programming
- Andy Skib – composer, engineer, programming
- Greg Strizek – mixing
- Bruce Springsteen – composer
- Andy Waldeck – composer

Instruments

- Nick Adams – drums
- Monty Anderson – bass guitar
- David Cook – guitar
- Andy Skib – guitar

Imagery

- David Cook – art direction, design
- Rob Thacker – photography
- Dale Voelker – art direction, design

== Charts ==
Chart (2015)	Peak position
US Billboard 200	35
US Billboard Pop Albums Chart	4
US Independent Albums (Billboard)	8

== Release history ==
List of release dates, showing region, label, format, edition(s) and catalog number
Region	Date	Label	Format(s)	Edition(s)	Catalog
Australia	September 18, 2015	Analog Heart Music, Inc.	CD; digital download; vinyl	Standard; deluxe	
Canada	September 18, 2015	Analog Heart Music, Inc.	CD; digital download; vinyl	Standard; deluxe	
United Kingdom	September 18, 2015	Analog Heart Music, Inc.	CD; digital download; vinyl	Standard; deluxe	
United States	September 18, 2015	Analog Heart Music, Inc.	CD; digital download; vinyl	Standard; deluxe; Walmart Exclusive bonus tracks	
