= Laying Me Low =

Single by David Cook

from the album Digital Vein
- Released: April 30, 2013
- Recorded: 2013
- Genre: Pop rock
- Length: 3:39
- Label: XIX Recordings; Analog Heart
- Songwriter(s): David Cook; Andrew Waldeck; Chris Reardon
- Producer(s): David Cook

David Cook singles chronology
"The Last Song I'll Write for You" (2012)	"Laying Me Low" (2013)	"Wait for Me" (2014)

"Laying Me Low" is a song recorded by American recording artist David Cook. It was released as a single on April 30, 2013 through XIX Recordings and Cook's imprint Analog Heart Music. The song is also included on Cook's fourth studio album, Digital Vein (2015).

== Background ==
In 2012, Cook parted ways his post-Idol record label RCA Records in search of more creative control over his career. He self-released a new song, "The Last Song I'll Write for You", later that year before moving to Nashville, Tennessee to begin work on a new album. Cook co-wrote "Laying Me Low" with Andrew Waldeck and Chris Reardon and explained in an interview with The Hollywood Reporter that he was "refocusing on enjoying the creative process" of songwriting. The single was announced on April 21, 2013 before being released to digital retailers on April 30.

== Live performances ==
Cook performed the song during the Top 4 redux results show of the twelfth season of American Idol on May 2, 2013.

== Commercial reception ==
The single sold 14,000 copies in its first week of release, and resultantly debuted at number 36 on the Billboard Pop Digital Songs component chart.

== Chart performance ==
Chart (2013)	Peak position
US Pop Digital Songs (Billboard)	36

== Release history ==
Country	Date	Format	Label
United States	April 30, 2013	Digital download	XIX Recordings; Analog Heart
