= Dream Big (David Cook song) =

Song performed by David Cook

Song by David Cook
- Released: May 21, 2008
- Recorded: 2008
- Genre: Rock
- Label: 19
- Songwriter(s): Emily Shackleton
- Producer(s): David Cook

"Dream Big" is a rock song performed by David Cook on season 7 of American Idol, of which he won. It was written by Emily Shackelton as an entry for the American Idol Songwriting Contest 2008. Cook chose the song to perform and the song was one of the top 10 finalists to be his debut single, losing to "The Time of My Life".

His performance received positive reviews from Randy Jackson and Paula Abdul on the performance night. However, Simon Cowell criticized it saying that the song "didn't really sound like a winning song."

After the season ended, the song debuted at number fifteen on the Billboard Hot 100, the highest of Cook's performances on American Idol.

== Charts ==
Chart (2008)	Peak position
Canadian Hot 100	21
U.S. Billboard Hot 100	15
U.S. Billboard Pop 100	17
