= The Last Goodbye (David Cook song) =

Single by David Cook

from the album This Loud Morning
- Released: April 19, 2011
- Recorded: 2011
- Genre: Pop rock
- Length: 3:00
- Label: RCA
- Songwriter(s): David Cook; Ryan Tedder
- Producer(s): Matt Serletic

David Cook singles chronology
"Permanent" (2009)	"The Last Goodbye" (2011)	"Fade into Me" (2011)

"The Last Goodbye" is a song by American singer David Cook from his second major studio album This Loud Morning. It was released as the lead single on April 19, 2011, through RCA Records. It was written by Cook and Ryan Tedder with production by Matt Serletic.

== Song information ==
On March 31, 2011, Cook tweeted that the first single of his upcoming album would be called "The Last Goodbye" and it would be released on April 19. Lyrics of the chorus were soon released afterwards. "The Last Goodbye" was co-written by Cook and OneRepublic frontman Ryan Tedder.

== Release ==
The single was released on April 19, 2011.

== Music video ==
The music video premiered on May 23, 2011, on iTunes. It was directed by Nigel Dick who is famous for directing music videos for the likes of Britney Spears, Oasis and Nickelback and shot in Malibu on May 7, 2011. The plot of the video revolves around Cook's visit to the beach to write a few songs and get over the loss of his girl. He then arrives at a beach and after paying the taxi driver, he drops his wallet. After writing some songs, he takes off his jacket and starts walking along the beach. A woman walks by and sees his belongings and footsteps that led out to the sea. Fearing that Cook had drowned, she calls the police and explains everything. Meanwhile, Cook returns to his room solving a crossword puzzle and playing the guitar and has no idea what is going on. A police border was made around the beach and some of Cook's band members tells their bandmate Neal Tiemann about the news which was printed on the front page of the newspaper bearing the caption 'David Cook, Feared Drowned'. They then watch the news where the news caption says 'Singer left note'. Cook who has no idea what is going on, then leaves his room and sees his band members outside looking sad. Oblivious to his presence, he asks them "What are you looking at?". Then his drummer faints.

== Chart performance ==
"The Last Goodbye" sold 22,000 copies in its first week of release and entered the Bubbling Under Hot 100 chart at number five.

=== Charts ===
Chart	Peak position
US Bubbling Under Hot 100 (Billboard)	5
US Adult Contemporary (Billboard)	17
US Adult Pop Airplay (Billboard)	29

== Sales ==
As of August 3, 2011, the single has sold 45,000 units (not inclusive of free downloads from pre-orders)
