= Fade into Me =

Single by David Cook

from the album This Loud Morning
- Released: October 11, 2011
- Recorded: 2011
- Genre: Pop rock
- Length: 4:07 (Album Version); 3:40 (Radio Edit)
- Label: RCA
- Songwriter(s): David Cook; Kevin Griffin; Jamie Houston
- Producer(s): Matt Serletic

David Cook singles chronology
"The Last Goodbye" (2011)	"Fade into Me" (2011)	"The Last Song I'll Write for You" (2012)

"Fade into Me" is the second single from American rock singer David Cook's second major label studio album, This Loud Morning. It was written by Cook along with Kevin Griffin, and Jamie Houston and produced by Matt Serletic. This is Cook's last single released by RCA Records.

== Background and composition ==
On October 6, 2011, Cook announced on his website that "Fade into Me" would be the second single from This Loud Morning. It was written by Cook, Kevin Griffin, and Jamie Houston with production by Matt Serletic.

== Release ==
It was released on October 11, 2011, by RCA Records.

== Music video ==
In an interview published October 19, 2011, Cook discussed the planned video treatment for "Fade into Me," stating: "The content of the video, I wanted to showcase how we are live. I feel like it’s really easy sometimes to throw a tie on, and comb your hair, and put together this really sweet storyline; and I think “Fade into Me” could have definitely taken that angle and it would have worked. I wanted this video to be kind of a no frills, no pretense kind of look at us on the road. It’s a lot of live footage, really just for lack of a better way to phrase it, it’s more of a day in the life kind of thing.". The video (directed by Christopher Sims) debuted November 1, 2011, on VEVO.

== Critical reception ==
Scott Shelter of Popcrush wrote that the song "is not the most imaginative song we've ever heard, but its honest, sincere message should resonate with listeners."

== Uses in media ==
On the June 22, 2011, episode of So You Think You Can Dance, Jordan Casanova and Tadd Gadduang danced the Viennese waltz to the song.

== Charts ==
Chart (2011)	Peak position
US Adult Pop Songs (Billboard)	33
