= Midwest Kings =

American band

Midwest Kings (MWK)

Background information
- Origin: Tulsa, Oklahoma, United States
- Genres: Alternative rock, post-grunge, hard rock
- Years active: 2001–present
- Members: Andy Skib (lead vocals, guitar); Neal Tiemann (lead guitar, backing vocals); David Cook (guitar, backing vocals); Kyle Peek (drums); Joey Clement (bass)
- Past members: Josh Center (drums); Robby Merrick (drums); Justin Briggs (bass); Bryan Jewett (bass)

Midwest Kings (aka MWK) is a touring band based in Tulsa, Oklahoma, whose most notable member is David Cook, winner of the seventh season of American Idol. Described as a "regional touring band", the Midwest Kings play throughout the midwest, including gigs in states ranging from their home base of Oklahoma, through Kansas, Missouri, Nebraska, and Wisconsin.

== Discography ==
=== Albums ===
- Song for a King
- Winds of Change: The Acoustics
- Midwest Kings (2003)
- Judging a Bullet (2005)
- Incoherent With Desire to Move On (2006)
- Luna Despierta (2008)
- The Sanctuary Live Sessions (2010)
- Luna Espera (2011)
- Luna Se Hunde (2012)
