= David Cook (album) =

Studio album by David Cook
- Released: November 18, 2008
- Recorded: June – August 2008
- Genres: Pop rock; alternative rock; post-grunge
- Length: 52:40; 55:43 (Wal-Mart Bonus Track)
- Labels: RCA; 19
- Producer: Rob Cavallo

David Cook chronology
Analog Heart (2006)	David Cook (2008)	This Loud Morning (2011)

Singles from David Cook
- 1. "Light On" Released: September 30, 2008; 2. "Permanent" Released: March 23, 2009; 3. "Come Back to Me / Bar-ba-sol" Released: May 18, 2009

David Cook is the second studio album from seventh season American Idol winner David Cook, released on November 18, 2008, in the United States by RCA Records. It was certified platinum and has sold over one million copies in the United States. It has produced two top twenty singles, "Light On" and "Come Back To Me". The single "The Time of My Life" has also been certified platinum by the RIAA. "Light On" was certified platinum in January 2010.

== Singles ==
The first single, "Light On", was released to U.S. radio on September 30, 2008. The song sold 109,000 digital downloads in its first week of availability, leading to a number seventeen debut on the Billboard Hot 100 and number eight on the Hot Digital Songs chart. "Light On" was certified platinum in January 2010.

"Come Back to Me" and "Bar-ba-sol" were released as a dual A-side single in March 2009 as the second and third singles, respectively. The video for "Come Back to Me" premiered on American Idol on April 1.

On May 20, 2009, Cook performed the song "Permanent" on the finale of American Idol Season 8. This version was released as a digital single, independent of the album promotion, with the proceeds from the song and the video of his performance going to charity. The single version of the song is longer than the version on his album.

"The Time of My Life" (his first feature single as the winner of American Idol) is also featured as a bonus track on the album.

== Critical reception ==
Professional ratings
Aggregate scores
Source	Rating
Metacritic	61/100
Review scores
Source	Rating
AllMusic	3.5/5 stars
Artistdirect	link
Blender	1.5/5 stars
Entertainment Weekly	B
Newsday	B+
Rolling Stone	2.5/5 stars
Us Weekly	link
USA Today	2.5/4 stars
TuneLab Music	link

The album's reception has been generally mixed to positive. Entertainment Weekly gave the album a positive review saying, "They give David Cook's clutch of bombastic verse-chorus- verse rockers an impressive melodic sheen, one well suited to Cook's husky, expressive vocals. If anything, the series of booming midtempo anthems (most notable among them "Bar-ba-sol" and "Mr. Sensitive") could use a little sandpapering around the edges." AllMusic concurred writing, "He not only is a star thanks to AmIdol, but he's always been ready to do big, happy, crowd-pleasing grunge-pop, as his self-released 2006 debut, Analog Heart, proved. David Cook is remarkably similar to that now-suppressed effort, heavy on crawling, melodic midtempo rockers and power ballads, only given more gloss in its production and writing."

Billboard said of the album, "Much like his predecessors' quick-turnaround debuts, Cook's is fairly generic, but its rock edge is dirtied up with crunching guitars and the artist's tuneful growl. There are a host of big, anthemic choruses that highlight the power of Cook's voice, namely the soaring "Declaration" and Chris Cornell/Brian Howes-penned "Light On." Elsewhere, Cook exercises his right to rawk with the swaggering, gritty "Bar-ba-sol" and bares his soul alongside a delicate piano and string arrangement on "Permanent." There are some lyrical missteps ("Life on the Moon," which marvels at the titular concept), but as the lone rocker winner of "Idol" to date, Cook stands apart from cookie-cutter pop."

Rolling Stone gave the album an average review commenting on its lack of "out-of-the-box songwriting". Meanwhile, Ken Barnes of USA Today was also subdued in his review, particularly criticizing the production team and the song choices made on the album. Of it, he wrote, "they did him a disservice ... [Cook] has a more supple, versatile voice than Daughtry, and he demonstrated vastly more musical originality than most Idol finalists, but you'd never know it from this collection of formulaic, tune-averse tracks."

== Track listing ==
No.	Title	Writer(s)	Length
1.	"Declaration"	David Cook; Johnny Rzeznik; Gregg Wattenberg	3:13
2.	"Heroes"	Cook; Cathy Dennis; Raine Maida	3:27
3.	"Light On"	Chris Cornell; Brian Howes	3:49
4.	"Come Back to Me"	Amund Bjørklund; Espen Lind; Zac Maloy	4:07
5.	"Life on the Moon"	Cook; Bjørklund; Lind; Maloy	3:38
6.	"Bar-ba-sol"	Cook; Danny Grady; Dan Dixon; Steve Slovisky; Chris Wojtal; Jade Lemons	4:27
7.	"Mr. Sensitive"	Cook; Maida	3:37
8.	"Lie"	Cook; Bjørklund; Lind; Maloy	3:49
9.	"I Did It for You"	Cook; Maida	3:49
10.	"Avalanche"	Cook; Kevin Griffin	4:32
11.	"Permanent"	Cook; Maida; Chantal Kreviazuk	2:56
12.	"A Daily AntheM" "Kiss on the Neck" (hidden track after 7:36 of silence, beginning at 12:00; full track is 15:24. Included on all hard copies of the CD)	Cook: Cook; Neal Tiemann	4:23; 3:17
13.	"The Time of My Life" (Bonus Track)	Regie Hamm	3:36
14.	"My Last Request" (iTunes pre-order Bonus track)	Cook; Jess Cates; David Hodges	3:30
15.	"Breathe Tonight" (Japanese edition and Walmart Bonus track)	Cook; Sam Hollander; Dave Katz	3:03

== Personnel ==
Adapted credits from the album's liner notes and AllMusic.

Vocals

- David Cook – vocals

Musicians

- Paul Bushnell – bass
- David Campbell – strings arrangement
- Rob Cavallo – additional guitars, keyboard, piano
- David Cook — guitar
- Dorian Crozier – drums
- Jamie Muhoberac – keyboard, organ, piano
- Tim Pierce – gitars
- Neal Tiemann – guitars

Production

- Keith Armstrong – additional Pro Tools, assistant engineer
- Rob Cavallo – producer
- Dorian Crozier – audio production, programming
- Tyler Dragness – guitar tech
- Mike Fansano – drum tech
- Lars Fox – additional Pro Tools
- Simon Fuller – manager
- Ted Jensen – mastering
- Cheryl Jenets – production coordination

- Nik Karpen – additional Pro Tools, assistant engineer
- Chris Lord – mixing
- Doug McKean – engineer
- Jamie Neely – production assistant
- Steve Rea – assistant engineer
- Steve Salas – musical direction
- Emerson Wahl – studio assistant
- Seth Waldmann – audio engineer, assistant engineer
- Russ Waugh – studio assistant

Imagery

- Art Conn – styling
- David Cook – art direction
- Chris Feldmann — art direction, design
- Erwin Gorostiza – art direction
- Frank Ockenfels – photographer
- Roxanne Staffaie – make-up

== Release history ==
List of release dates, showing region, and label
Region	Date	Label
United States	November 18, 2008	RCA; 19
Brazil	March 11, 2009	Sony Music Entertainment
United Kingdom	April 5, 2009	RCA; 19
Japan	July 7, 2009	Sony Music Japan

== Chart performance ==
The album debuted at the number-three spot on the Billboard 200 chart with sales of 280,000 copies in the United States. In the beginning of February 2009, it was announced that the album had been certified platinum by RIAA for shipment of 1,000,000 copies. The album also broke digital sales records for a debut artist, selling 59,000 electronic copies. The album has sold over 1,500,000 copies worldwide.

Chart (2008–2009)	Peak position
Finnish Albums Chart	15
U.S. Billboard 200	3
U.S. Billboard Top Rock Albums	2
Canadian Albums Chart	11
Japanese Albums Chart	130

Year-end chart (2009)	Rank
U.S. Billboard 200	13
U.S. Billboard Top Rock Albums	4
U.S. Billboard Top Internet Albums	9

== Sales and certifications ==
Country	Total sales	Digital sales	Certification
United States	1,500,000	158,000	Platinum
Canada	50,000		Gold

== Notes ==
- The song "A Daily AntheM" was featured on the eighth season of American Idol during the audition episodes.
- The song "Heroes" was featured on the commercial for the FIFA World Cup and when he was on Extreme Makeover: Home Edition while he was coming off the bus. It was also used as the soundtrack for NBC Sports Championship Season promos in 2010 for: The Kentucky Derby (May), The Players (May), The Preakness Stakes (May), The French Open (June), the Stanley Cup Final (June), US Open (June), and Wimbledon (July).
