= Light On =

Single by David Cook

from the album David Cook
- Released: September 30, 2008 (iTunes); October 13, 2008 (Radio)
- Recorded: 2008
- Genre: Alternative rock
- Length: 3:46
- Label: RCA
- Songwriters: Chris Cornell, Brian Howes
- Producer: Rob Cavallo

David Cook singles chronology
"The Time of My Life" (2008)	"Light On" (2008)	"Come Back to Me / Bar-ba-sol" (2009)

"Light On" is the first official single released from American Idol season 7 winner David Cook's major label debut studio album, David Cook (2008). It was released through RCA Records on September 30, 2008. The song reached No. 17 on the Billboard Hot 100 and was certified Platinum by the RIAA.

== Song information ==
"Light On" was co-written by Soundgarden and Audioslave front man Chris Cornell, as well as producer/songwriter Brian Howes. The song was produced by Grammy-winning producer Rob Cavallo, who has produced hits for Green Day and Kid Rock. The song also displays Cook's upper register, with the singer hitting a high C at the end of each verse.

== Release ==
The song's lyrics were posted on Cook's official website on September 22, 2008. "Light On" officially debuted on AOL Music's PopEater section on September 23, 2008. It became available for radio airplay later the same day, but officially went for adds on Mainstream Top 40, AC, and Rock radio on October 13, 2008. It was released via iTunes and Amazon on September 30, 2008.

== Reception ==
Reception of "Light On" was generally positive to mixed. Billboard's Chuck Taylor said that "melodically, there's no question that this bullet is heading right for the brain, where the only thing stickier than the chorus is Cook's appreciably sweaty performance". He predicted success for Cook, stating "Like Chris Daughtry before him, here's an Idol who is bound for true rock cred", summing it up with "Light On" is right on."

Todd Martens of the Los Angeles Times predicted chart success by saying the song was "sure to be inescapable this holiday season". He called it "full-on, cellphone-waving arena rock schmaltz, with husky, slow-moving guitars and a wallop of meaninglessly earnest vocals".

Michael Slezak of Entertainment Weekly said that Cook "is poised to be part of a balanced, mainstream rock diet alongside artists like 3 Doors Down, Nickelback, and Staind". He also called the song catchy, saying, "After two listens, the 'Light On' chorus got caught in my head like butter in the crannies of an English muffin". Though unimpressed with the song's lyrics, claiming they "feel more like a logjam of carefully focus-grouped words than anything deeply meaningful", he concluded that "the bottom line is: 'Light On' is probably going to be a major hit".

Ken Barnes of USA Today, however, was unimpressed with the single, despite being a fervent supporter of Cook on American Idol. Barnes called the song "Daughtry lite" as well as "a paint-by-numbers rock-ballad tune". Los Angeles Times writer, Ann Powers, also appeared unimpressed with the single, referring to it as a "banger in the worst sense of the word".

=== Acclaims ===
- Apr 21, 2010 - Honored at ASCAP's 27th Annual Pop Music Awards as Most Performed Song
- May 18, 2010 - BMI Pop Awards, Award-Winning Song

== Music video ==
The music video for "Light On" was shot on October 21 and 22 at the Los Angeles Valley College football stadium with Wayne Isham as the director. The video was debuted on November 3 shortly after midnight. The video is a performance video of Cook and his band singing on a stage in the football stadium, and also features a plot of a teenage boy working at a diner. A teenage girl, portrayed by Mika Boorem, walks into the diner and he watches her, becoming jealous when her boyfriend comes to the diner. Near the end, the girl fights with her boyfriend in his car, after he hit on some girls at the diner before her eyes, and gets out of the car, but he drives away and leaves her stranded there, late at night. The boy from the diner shows up on his bike and gives her a ride home on the handlebars of the bike.

== Chart performance ==
"Light On" sold 109,000 digital downloads in its first week of availability, leading to a number seventeen debut on the Billboard Hot 100. It is Cook's second top twenty hit on the chart and second top forty hit. On February 1, 2009, "Light On" reached number twenty on Mainstream Top 40 radio, becoming Cook's first top twenty hit in that format. It has become his second, consecutive top ten hit on the Adult Top 40, reaching number four. It has sold more than 1 million downloads in the U.S. to date. The single would later receive its RIAA Gold and Platinum certifications on January 20, 2010. In Canada, it debuted at number 61 on the Canadian Hot 100 based on downloads, but then fell off the chart the next week. A few weeks later it made a re-entry on the chart, finally peaking at number 27.

== Charts and certifications ==
=== Weekly charts ===
Chart (2008–2009)	Peak position
Canada (Canadian Hot 100)	27
Canada AC (Billboard)	50
Canada CHR/Top 40 (Billboard)	34
Canada Hot AC (Billboard)	5
Finland (Suomen virallinen lista)	8
US Billboard Hot 100	17
US Adult Contemporary (Billboard)	10
US Adult Pop Airplay (Billboard)	4
US Pop Airplay (Billboard)	20

=== Year-end charts ===
Chart (2009)	Peak position
US Adult Contemporary (Billboard)	24
US Adult Pop Songs (Billboard)	18

=== Certifications ===
Region	Certification	Certified units/sales
United States (RIAA)	Platinum	1,166,000
