= Permanent (song) =

Single by David Cook
- Released: May 18, 2009 (U.S.)
- Recorded: 2008
- Genre: Alternative rock
- Length: 2:57 (album version); 3:23 (single version)
- Label: RCA/19 Records
- Songwriter(s): David Cook, Chantal Kreviazuk, Raine Maida
- Producer(s): Rob Cavallo

David Cook singles chronology
"Come Back to Me / Bar-ba-sol" (2009)	"Permanent" (2009)	"The Last Goodbye" (2010)

"'Permanent" is a song recorded by American rock singer David Cook. Written by Cook, Chantal Kreviazuk, and Raine Maida, its lyrics make allusions to Cook's late brother, Adam, who had battled with brain cancer before his death from this disease. The song was performed on the finale of season 8 of the TV show American Idol, and the performance then released onto iTunes as a charity single via RCA Records on May 18, 2009. It also appears on his debut studio album, David Cook (2008).

All proceeds from iTunes sales of the American Idol finale performance of the song will go to ABC^{2} (Accelerate Brain Cancer Cure).

== Commercial reception ==
"Permanent" debuted at number 24 on the U.S. Billboard Hot 100 chart for the chart week of May 29, 2009, and number 10 on the Digital Songs component chart, selling 103,000 downloads. It also debuted at number 26 on the Billboard Canadian Hot 100 and number 7 on the Canadian Digital Songs component chart. As of June 2009, the song has sold 159,000 units, of which 98,000 are of the version on David Cook and 61,000 are from the AI Charity Version.

== Charts ==
Chart (2009)	Peak position
Canada (Canadian Hot 100)	26
US Billboard Hot 100	24
US Billboard Pop 100	34
