= Come Back to Me (David Cook song) =

2009 single by David Cook

Single by David Cook

from the album David Cook
- B-side: "Bar-ba-sol"
- Released: March 23, 2009 (iTunes); April 6, 2009 (Radio)
- Recorded: 2008
- Genre: Pop rock
- Length: 4:07
- Label: RCA
- Songwriters: Amund Bjørklund, Espen Lind, Zac Maloy
- Producer: Rob Cavallo

David Cook singles chronology
"Light On" (2008)	"Come Back to Me" (2009)	"Permanent" (2009)

"Come Back to Me" is the second official single released from American Idol season 7 winner David Cook's major label debut studio album, David Cook (2008). It was released as a joint double-A single with "Bar-ba-sol".

== Song information ==
"Come Back to Me" was written by Espionage, the Norwegian songwriting and music production team consisting of Amund Bjørklund and Espen Lind, along with Zac Maloy. The song was produced by Grammy winning producer Rob Cavallo. Cook described the song as being about "loving someone you can't be near."

== Release ==
"Come Back to Me" was confirmed as a joint single with "Bar-ba-sol" to be released in March 2009 in an Entertainment Weekly piece on February 27, 2009. Cook publicly debuted the song through a performance on American Idol on April 1, 2009.

== Reception ==
Billboard's Chris Williams review stated that "Cook gives an earnest, restrained vocal performance, reflective of the pensive lyric about letting a loved one go so that person can grow."

=== Acclaims ===
- May 18, 2010 - 2010 BMI Pop Awards Award-Winning Song
- Oct 5, 2010 - 2010 BMI London Pop Awards Award-Winning Song

== Music video ==
The "Come Back to Me" music video was filmed at Los Angeles International Airport on March 5, 2009 and was directed by Gavin Bowden. In the video, Sarah Roemer plays Cook's girlfriend. After a bulletin sent by David Cook's official fan page, the video was released on April 1, 2009. First, it was released as a sneak peek on American Idol prior to Cook's performance of "Come Back to Me" and then it was released through AT&T later the same day. Cook stated that he had to learn to sing the song backwards.

It was similar to many past music videos, which were also shot backwards. Popular "The Scientist" by Coldplay has been a big comparison. Many similarities such as Cook jumping over the wall is seen in The Scientist as well, the main difference is when the music video ends with everything reversing and starts to move forward again, where this is not seen in The Scientist. Both singers had to learn the song backwards for the music videos.

The video was shot in a backward motion. It starts with Cook washing his face and singing to himself while looking into the mirror. He then walks backwards and enters a room where he plays the piano with his band. He then gets up and walks backwards through a parking lot and a forest, where he enters a taxi. He is then exits the taxi and walks backwards through the airport, where couples are embracing. He gets onto an escalator and heads to the terminal where he meets his love interest. They hug and kiss, and as they kiss, time stops and everyone is frozen except the two of them. As they finish their kiss, a tear is shown rolling into the girl's eye. At this point everything begins moving forward again. She walks away from Cook to her plane and he stares after her.

== Chart performance ==
"Come Back to Me" debuted at number 49 on the Billboard Pop 100 chart issued April 9, 2009. It also debuted and peaked at number 63 on the Billboard Hot 100 for the chart dated April 18, 2009 due to high digital downloads and airplay after David Cook performed the song on season 8 of American Idol. The song has also reached number six on the Billboard Hot Adult Top 40 Tracks and number eleven on the Billboard Hot Adult Contemporary Tracks charts.

== Charts ==
=== Weekly charts ===
Chart (2009)	Peak Position
Canada Hot AC (Billboard)	39
US Billboard Hot 100	63
US Billboard Pop 100	49
US Adult Pop Airplay (Billboard)	6
US Adult Contemporary (Billboard)	15

=== Year-end charts ===
Chart (2009)	Peak position
US Adult Contemporary (Billboard)	34
US Adult Pop Songs (Billboard)	16

== Sales and certifications ==
Region	Certification	Certified units/sales
United States	—	514,000

== Release history ==
Country	Date	Format	Label	Ref.
United States	March 23, 2009	Digital download	RCA Records / 19 Records	
United States	March 30, 2009	Hot adult contemporary	RCA Records / 19 Records	
United States	April 6, 2009	Contemporary hit radio	RCA Records / 19 Records	

== Covers ==
- Tim Urban covered the song with an acoustic guitar as his first solo performance in Hollywood Week on the ninth season of American Idol.
- Daniel Evans, a finalist on The X Factor (UK) released a piano acoustic ballad version on his YouTube channel and subsequently included it on his self produced "Storm" EP.

== Bar-ba-sol ==
"Bar-ba-sol"

Single by David Cook

from the album David Cook
- A-side: "Come Back to Me"
- Released: March 23, 2009
- Genre: Hard rock, post-grunge
- Length: 4:27
- Label: RCA/19 Records
- Songwriters: David Cook, Danny Grady, Jade Lemons, Steve Slovisky, Chris Wojtal
- Producer: Rob Cavallo

David Cook singles chronology
"Light On" (2008)	"Bar-ba-sol" (2009)	"Permanent" (2009)

"Spun Again" is a song written and recorded by American hard rock band Injected. David Cook recorded a cover version, titled "Bar-ba-sol", for his eponymous debut studio album (2008). He is credited as a co-writer for the changes he made to the song. "Bar-ba-sol" was released in conjunction with "Come Back to Me" in March 2009 as the album's second single.

=== Release ===
"Bar-ba-sol" was released as a dual-A-side single with "Come Back to Me", being promoted to mainstream rock and modern rock radio while the latter impacted the mainstream, hot adult contemporary, and adult contemporary formats.

=== Reception ===
Reception of "Bar-ba-sol" was generally positive.

Entertainment Weekly's Leah Greenblatt called "Bar-ba-sol" one of the more notable anthems on the album.

Allmusic's Stephen Thomas Erlewine called "Bar-ba-sol" the hardest-rocking (and best) song of the album.

Blender magazine's Chuck Eddy, despite giving the full album a negative review, wrote that the "power-chorded "Bar-ba-Sol," ... is the only place Cook flexes any muscle"

Newsday magazine's Glenn Gamboa wrote that "He stretches boundaries creatively with the metallic, grinding "Bar-Ba-Sol" - part Pearl Jam fist-pumper, part Alice in Chains slither."

=== Release history ===
Country	Date	Format	Label	Ref.
United States	March 23, 2009	Digital download	RCA Records / 19 Records	
United States	March 30, 2009	Mainstream rock	RCA Records / 19 Records	
United States	March 30, 2009	Modern rock	RCA Records / 19 Records	
