= Carnival Music =

Carnival Music Company
- Founded: 1997
- Founder: Frank Liddell; Travis Hill
- Country of origin: United States
- Location: Nashville, Tennessee
- Official website: http://www.carnivalmusic.net

Carnival Music Company is an independent music publishing company located in Nashville, Tennessee, United States. Carnival was founded in 1997 by Travis Hill and Frank Liddell (Liddell produced albums for Miranda Lambert, David Nail, Lee Ann Womack, Brandi Carlile, Charlie Worsham, Jack Ingram, the Eli Young Band, and Kellie Pickler). Carnival celebrated its fifteenth #1 song in 2017 with Darius Rucker's For The First Time. Carnival Music is the parent company to the record label, Carnival Recording Company.

== Current writers ==
- Adam Wright
- Aubrie Sellers
- Brent Cobb
- David Nail
- Derik Hultquist
- Dustin Christensen
- Gretchen Peters
- Jedd Hughes
- Marla Cannon-Goodman
- Waylon Payne

== Number one songs ==
| Year | Song | Artist | Writer(s) |
|---|---|---|---|
| 2017 | For The First Time | Darius Rucker | Scooter Carusoe, Derek George, Darius Rucker |
| 2016 | Wanna Be That Song | Brett Eldredge | Scooter Carusoe Brett Eldredge and Ross Copperman |
| 2015 | Mean To Me | Brett Eldredge | Scooter Carusoe and Brett Eldredge |
| 2011 | Let It Rain | David Nail | David Nail and Jonathan Singleton |
| 2010 | Pretty Good at Drinkin' Beer | Billy Currington | Troy Jones |
| 2009 | People Are Crazy | Billy Currington | Troy Jones and Bobby Braddock |
| 2009 | White Liar | Miranda Lambert | Natalie Hemby and Miranda Lambert |
| 2008 | Better as a Memory | Kenny Chesney | Scooter Carusoe and Lady Goodman |
| 2007 | Moments | Emerson Drive | Annie Tate, Sam Tate and Dave Berg |
| 2007 | Wrapped | George Strait | Bruce Robison |
| 2006 | If You're Going Through Hell (Before the Devil Even Knows) | Rodney Atkins | Annie Tate, Sam Tate and Dave Berg |
| 2005 | Anything But Mine | Kenny Chesney | Scooter Carusoe |
| 2004 | Somebody | Reba McEntire | Annie Tate, Sam Tate and Dave Berg |
| 2002 | Travelin' Soldier | The Dixie Chicks | Bruce Robison |
| 2001 | Angry All the Time | Tim McGraw | Bruce Robison |

== Other hits ==
| Year | Song | Artist | Writer(s) |
|---|---|---|---|
| 2017 | Drunk Girl | Chris Janson | Scooter Carusoe, Tom Douglas, and Chris Janson |
| 2016 | Rock On | Tucker Beathard | Marla Cannon-Goodman, Tucker Beathard, and Casey Beathard |
| 2013 | All Kinds of Kinds | Miranda Lambert | Phillip Coleman and Don Henry |
| 2012 | The Sound of a Million Dreams | David Nail | Scooter Carusoe and Phil Vassar |
| 2011 | Tailgate Blues | Luke Bryan | Brent Cobb and Neil Medley |
| 2011 | Put You in a Song | Keith Urban | Jedd Hughes, Sarah Buxton, and Keith Urban |
| 2010 | Turning Home | David Nail | Scooter Carusoe and Kenny Chesney |
| 2008 | Baggage Claim | Miranda Lambert | Natalie Hemby, Miranda Lambert, and Luke Laird |
| 2008 | Gunpowder & Lead | Miranda Lambert | Heather Little and Miranda Lambert |
| 2007 | Shiftwork (song) | Kenny Chesney with George Strait | Troy Jones |
| 2004 | Desperately | George Strait | Bruce Robison and Monte Warden |
| 2004 | Me and Charlie Talkin’ | Miranda Lambert | Heather Little and Miranda Lambert |
| 2001 | Downtime | Jo Dee Messina | Phillip Coleman and Carolyn Dawn Johnson |

== Other notable cuts ==
| Song | Artist | Writer(s) |
|---|---|---|
| Love Me or Leave Me Alone | Dustin Lynch | Dustin Christensen and Chris Gelbuda |
| The Older I Get | Alan Jackson | Adam Wright, Hailey Whitters, and Sarah Allison Turner |
| Ain't A Road Too Long | Brent Cobb | Brent Cobb |
| All The Trouble | Lee Ann Womack | Adam Wright, Waylon Payne, and Lee Ann Womack |
| The Lonely, The Lonesome & The Gone | Lee Ann Womack | Adam Wright and Jay Knowles |
| Hollywood | Lee Ann Womack | Adam Wright, Waylon Payne, Mando Saenz, and Lee Ann Womack |
| End Of The End Of The World | Lee Ann Womack | Adam Wright |
| Bottom of The Barrel | Lee Ann Womack | Brent Cobb and Jason Saenz |
| Shine On Rainy Day | Lee Ann Womack | Brent Cobb and Andrew Combs |
| Mama Lost Her Smile | Lee Ann Womack | Adam Wright, Waylon Payne, and Lee Ann Womack |
| Wicked | Lee Ann Womack | Adam Wright and Lee Ann Womack |
| Someone Else's Heartache Now | Lee Ann Womack | Dani Flowers, Dale Dodson, and Lee Ann Womack |
| Sunday | Lee Ann Womack | Waylon Payne |
| Faithful | Tucker Beathard | Marla Cannon-Goodman and Tucker Beathard |
| Stupid | Levi Hummon | Scooter Carusoe, Chris DeStefano, and Levi Hummon |
| Happy People | Little Big Town | Hailey Whitters and Lori McKenna |
| All The Way To Me | Dierks Bentley | Scooter Carusoe, Luke Dick, and Dierks Bentley |
| Sometimes I Cry | Chris Stapleton | Clint Ingersoll and Chris Stapleton |
| To Learn Her | Miranda Lambert | Waylon Payne, Ashley Monroe, and Miranda Lambert |
| Use My Heart | Miranda Lambert | Waylon Payne, Ashley Monroe, and Miranda Lambert |
| Good Ol' Days | Miranda Lambert | Brent Cobb, Adam Hood, and Miranda Lambert |
| Bad Boy | Miranda Lambert | Mando Saenz and Miranda Lambert |
| You Could've Loved Me | Frankie Ballard | Dustin Christensen and Chris Gelbuda |
| Good As Gold | Frankie Ballard | Mando Saenz and Justin Bogart |
| Panama City | Lee Brice | Mark Irwin, Chris Thompkins, and Josh Kear |
| Carolina Can | Chase Rice | Scooter Carusoe and Chase Rice |
| Stay All Night | Little Big Town | Brent Cobb, Jim Westbrook, Phillip Sweet, and Jason Saenz |
| When I Come Around | Lee Ann Womack | Mando Saenz |
| One Way Ticket | Billy Currington | Troy Jones and Greg Becker |
| When God Paints | Alan Jackson | Troy Jones and Greg Becker |
| The One You're Waiting On | Alan Jackson | Adam Wright and Shannon Wright |
| Stop and Drink | George Strait | Dale Dodson and Troy Jones |
| Wrong About You | Garth Brooks | Adam Wright |
| Don't It | Kenny Chesney | Brent Cobb and Chase McGill |
| Old Sh!t | Miranda Lambert | Brent Cobb and Neil Medley |
| Pavement Ends | Little Big Town | Brent Cobb and Jason Saenz |
| Airstream Song | Miranda Lambert | Natalie Hemby and Miranda Lambert |
| The Bees | Lee Ann Womack | Natalie Hemby and Daniel Tashian |
| Blame It On Me | Lee Ann Womack | Bruce Robison |
| Fall Into Me | Sugarland | Scooter Carusoe, Jennifer Nettles, and Kristian Bush |
| Get in the Car and Drive | Eli Young Band | Blu Sanders |
| Guinevere | Eli Young Band | Scooter Carusoe and Mike Eli |
| Heart Of The World | Lady Antebellum | Scooter Carusoe and Tom Douglas |
| Hold On | Jack Ingram | Blu Sanders |
| Jet Black and Jealous | Eli Young Band | Scooter Carusoe and Paul Sanchez |
| Like Me | Kenny Chesney | Troy Jones |
| Love Alone | Trisha Yearwood | Dan Colehour and David Grissom |
| Never Gonna Feel Like That Again | Kenny Chesney | Phillip Coleman and Paul Overstreet |
| Old Town New | Tim McGraw | Bruce Robison and Darrell Scott |
| Only Prettier | Miranda Lambert | Natalie Hemby and Miranda Lambert |
| Play On | Carrie Underwood | Natalie Hemby, Luke Laird, and Carrie Underwood |
| Radio Waves | Eli Young Band | Blu Sanders and Mike Eli |
| Solitary Thinkin' | Lee Ann Womack | Waylon Payne |
| Stubborn (Psalm 151) | Lee Ann Womack | Don Schlitz and Brett James |
| Timing Is Everything | Trace Adkins | Natalie Hemby and Troy Jones |
| Timing Is Everything | Garrett Hedlund | Natalie Hemby and Troy Jones |
| Virginia Bluebell | Miranda Lambert | Natalie Hemby, Jennifer Kennard, and Miranda Lambert |
| We Run | Sugarland | Scooter Carusoe, Jennifer Nettles, and Kristian Bush |
| Wishing | Sugarland | Scooter Carusoe, Jennifer Nettles, and Kristian Bush |
| Where Are We Goin' | Luke Bryan | Luke Bryan, and Brent Cobb |
| Forever | Keith Urban | Brent Cobb and Jaren Johnston |
| Only | Tucker Beathard | Marla Cannon-Goodman and Tucker Beathard |
| Faithful | Tucker Beathard | Marla Cannon-Goodman and Tucker Beathard |
| You Don't Get To | Kenny Chesney | Josh Kerr, Dustin Christensen, and Barry Dean |
| Someone To Fix | Kenny Chesney | Scooter Carusoe and Jon Nite |
| Same Devil | Brandy Clark | Marla Cannon-Goodman, Hailey Whitters, and Brandy Clark |
| I Kept The Roses | Tenille Townes | Chris Gelbuda, Dustin Christensen, and Tenille Townes |
| Desperately | Josh Turner | Bruce Robison and Monte Warden |
| High Note | Brothers Osborne | T.J. Osborne, John Osborne, Dustin Christensen, and Casey Beathard |
| Whiskey Sunrise | Chris Stapleton | Tim Krekel and Chris Stapleton |
| Way Back | Everette | Anthony Olympia, Brent Rupard, and Brent Cobb |
| Six Feet Apart | Luke Combs | Rob Snyder, Brent Cobb, and Luke Combs |
| Beer's Better Cold | Travis Denning | Cole Taylor, Travis Denning, and Scooter Carusoe |

== Past writers ==
- Adam Hood
- Annie Tate
- Blu Sanders
- Brent Rodgers
- Bruce Robison
- Carter Wood
- Charlie Pate
- Clint Ingersoll
- Craig Dillingham
- Dan Colehour
- David Grissom
- Eric Wilson
- Hailey Whitters
- Heather Little
- Luke Reed
- Mando Saenz
- Mark Irwin
- Natalie Hemby
- Phillip Coleman
- Rick Brantley
- Roman Candle
- Sam Tate
- Scooter Carusoe
- Shane Stockton
- Stephanie Lambring
- Madeleine Slate
- Rob Baird
- Troy Jones
