= List of songs written and performed by David Cook =

The list of songs written and performed by David Cook comprises original songs recorded by American singer-songwriter David Cook for his studio albums, cover versions of songs by other artists performed by Cook, and original songs written by Cook that were recorded and released by other artists.

== Original songs ==
David Cook's original songs include those written and/or recorded by Cook and released on a studio album or on a single album. Cook has released four studio albums and 14 singles.

Key
†	Denotes a single release
‡	Denotes a B-side

Song	Performer(s)	Writer(s)	Album(s)	Year	Ref.
"4 Letter Word"	David Cook	David Cook; Claude Kelly; Matt Squire	This Loud Morning	2011	
"A Daily AntheM"	David Cook	David Cook	David Cook	2008	
"Avalanche"	David Cook	David Cook; Kevin Griffin	David Cook	2008	
"Bar-ba-sol"	David Cook	David Cook; Danny Grady; Dan Dixon; Steve Slovisky; Chris Wojtal; Jade Lemons	David Cook	2008	
"Better Than Me"	David Cook	Chase Foster	Digital Vein	2015	
"Breathe Tonight"	David Cook	David Cook; Sam Hollander; Dave Katz	David Cook	2008	
"Broken Windows"	David Cook	David Cook; Zac Maloy; Jerry Flowers	Digital Vein	2015	
"But You Wont"	David Cook	David Cook; Andy Skib	Digital Vein	2015	
"Carry You"	David Cook	David Cook; Blair Daly	Digital Vein	2015	
"Champion"	David Cook	David Cook	The Looking Glass	2021	
"Circadian"	David Cook	David Cook; David Hodges; Neal Tiemann	This Loud Morning	2011	
"Circles"	David Cook	David Cook	Chromance	2018	
"Come Back to Me"	David Cook	Amund Bjørklund; Espen Lind; Zac Maloy	David Cook	2008	
"Criminals"	David Cook	David Cook; Blair Daly	Digital Vein	2015	
"Death of Me"	David Cook	David Cook	Non-album single	2019	
"Declaration"	David Cook	David Cook; Johnny Rzeznik; Gregg Wattenberg	David Cook	2008	
"Don't Say a Word"	David Cook	David Cook	Analog Heart	2006	
"Eyes on You"	David Cook	David Cook; Andy Waldeck; Chris Reardon	Digital Vein	2015	
"Fade into Me"	David Cook	David Cook; Kevin Griffin; Jamie Houston	This Loud Morning	2011	
"Fall Back into Me"	David Cook	David Cook	Analog Heart	2006	
"Fire"	David Cook	David Cook	The Looking Glass	2021	
"Firing Squad"	David Cook	David Cook; David Hodges; Steven Miller	Digital Vein	2015	
"From Here to Zero"	David Cook	David Cook; Zac Maloy	Digital Vein	2015	
"Ghost Magnetic"	David Cook	David Cook; Ryan Star	Chromance	2018	
"Gimme Heartbreak"	David Cook	David Cook; Steve Rusch	Chromance	2018	
"Going Back"	David Cook	David Cook	The Looking Glass	2021	
"Goodbye to the Girl"	David Cook	David Cook; Neal Tiemann; Andy Skib	This Loud Morning	2011	
"Hard to Believe"	David Cook	David Cook; David Hodges; Jess Cates; Lindy Robbins	This Loud Morning	2011	
"Heartbeat"	David Cook	David Cook; Andy Waldeck; Chris Reardon	Digital Vein	2015	
"Heroes"	David Cook	David Cook; Cathy Dennis; Raine Maida	David Cook	2008	
"Home Movies (Over Your Shoulder)"	David Cook	David Cook; Kevin Griffin	Digital Vein	2015	
"I'm Gonna Love You"	David Cook	David Cook; Andy Waldeck; Andy Skib	Digital Vein	2015	
"I Did It For You"	David Cook	David Cook; Raine Maida	David Cook	2008	
"Kiss & Tell"	David Cook	David Cook; Andy Skib; Andy Waldeck	Digital Vein	2015	
"Kiss on the Neck"	David Cook	David Cook; Neal Tiemann	David Cook	2008	
"Laying Me Low"	David Cook	David Cook; Chris Reardon; Andy Waldeck	Digital Vein	2015	
"Let Go"	David Cook	David Cook	Analog Heart	2006	
"Let Me Fall for You"	David Cook	David Cook; Rune Westberg	This Loud Morning	2011	
"Lie"	David Cook	David Cook; Amund Bjørklund; Espen Lind; Zac Maloy	David Cook	2008	
"Life on the Moon"	David Cook	David Cook; Amund Bjørklund; Espen Lind; Zac Maloy	David Cook	2008	
"Light On"	David Cook	Chris Cornell; Brian Howes	David Cook	2008	
"Make A Move"	David Cook	David Cook	The Looking Glass	2021	
"Makeover"	David Cook	David Cook	Analog Heart	2006	
"Mr. Sensitive"	David Cook	David Cook; Raine Maida	David Cook	2008	
"My Last Request"	David Cook	David Cook; Jess Cates; David Hodges	David Cook	2008	
"Paper Heart"	David Cook	David Cook; Julian Emery; Jim Irvin	This Loud Morning	2011	
"Permanent	David Cook	David Cook; Raine Maida; Chantal Kreviazuk	David Cook	2008	
"Porcelain"	David Cook	David Cook	Analog Heart	2006	
"Rapid Eye Movement"	David Cook	David Cook; David Hodges	This Loud Morning	2011	
"Reds Turn Blue"	David Cook	David Cook	The Looking Glass	2020	
"Right Here, With You"	David Cook	David Cook; Johnny Rzeznik; Ryan Star; Gregg Wattenberg	This Loud Morning	2011	
"Searchlights"	David Cook	David Cook	Analog Heart	2006	
"Silver"	David Cook	David Cook	Analog Heart	2006	
"Stitches"	David Cook	David Cook	Analog Heart	2006	
"Straight Ahead"	David Cook	David Cook	Analog Heart	2006	
"Strange World"	David Cook	David Cook	The Looking Glass	2020	
"TABOS"	David Cook	David Cook	Non-album single	2022	
"Take Me as I Am"	David Cook	David Cook; Marti Frederiksen; Scott Stevens	This Loud Morning	2011	
"The Last Goodbye"	David Cook	David Cook; Ryan Tedder	This Loud Morning	2011	
"The Last Song I'll Write for You"	David Cook	David Cook; Andy Skib; Daniel James	Non-album single	2012	
"The Lucky Ones"	David Cook	David Cook; Tim Bruns	Chromance	2018	
"The Time of My Life	David Cook	Regie Hamm	David Cook	2008	
"The Truth"	David Cook	David Cook	Analog Heart	2006	
"This Is Not the Last Time"	David Cook	David Cook; David Hodges; Chris DeStefano	This Loud Morning	2011	
"Time Marches On"	David Cook	David Cook; Marti Frederiksen	This Loud Morning	2011	
"Wait for Me"	David Cook	David Cook; Chad Carlson	Digital Vein	2015	
"Warfare"	David Cook	David Cook; Nathan Chapman	Chromance	2018	
"We're Not in This Alone"	David Cook	David Cook; Andy Skib; Devin Bronson	Digital Vein	2015	
"We Believe"	David Cook	David Cook; Julian Emery; Jim Irvin	This Loud Morning	2011	
"Where Do We Go"	David Cook	David Cook; Andy Skib; Andy Waldeck	Digital Vein	2015	

== Unreleased original songs ==
Many songs written, recorded, and performed by David Cook have never been released. Many of these have been registered with professional music and copyright bodies, including the American Society of Composers, Authors and Publishers (ASCAP), the Broadcast Music Incorporated (BMI) and Warner/Chappell Music. Several have also been acknowledged and discussed by Cook in interviews, or by other sources.

Key
Denotes a leaked song

Song	Writers(s)	Ref.
"A Little Is Enough"	David Cook; Kevin Griffin; David Hodges	
"After Forever"	Chris Caminti; David Cook; Melissa Faye Pierce; Driver Williams	
"After Glow"	David Cook; Steve McEwan	
"Again"	David Cook; Ryan Lafferty	
"Ain't It Good to Be Young"	David Cook; Russell Patrick Davis; Jerry Flowers	
"Alibi"	David Cook; Julian Emery; James Lawrence Irvin	
"Best of Me"	David Cook; Austin Jenckes	
"Boomerang"	David Cook; Brian Howes	
"Break My Heart"	David Cook; Brandon Lancaster	
"Broken Bridges"	David Cook; Andrew Frampton; Savan Kotecha; Steve Mac	
"Broken Me/Broken You"	Tim Bruns; David Cook	
"Bumpersticker"	David Cook; Michael Pollack	
"Closer to Me"	David Cook	
"Comin' Home to You"	David Cook; Brandon Lay	
"Don't Want to Wait for Tonight"	David Cook; Andy Skib	
"Dream Big"	Emily Shackleton	
"Excite"	David Cook; Edmond Gerald Prevost; Raymond	
"Faster Horses"	Bonnie Baker; David Cook; Ryan Peterson	
"Fire"	David Cook; Sacha Skarbek; Martin Terefe	
"Four Walls"	David Cook; Cathy Dennis; Raine Maida	
"Freedom Gets You Lonely"	David Cook; Luke Sheets; Harry Walker; Mark Trussell	
"Get a Little on Ya'"	David Cook; Shane Minor	
"Give You Love"	David Cook; Emerson Hart; Boots Ottestad	
"Green Lights"	David Cook; Aaron Eshuis	
"Heartbreaker"	David Cook	
"Hellalujah"	David Cook; Aaron Raitiere	
"Hey Honey"	Rick Beato; David Cook; Dan Hannon	
"How We Got Here"	Relli Barber; David Cook	
"I Don't Wanna Be Like You"	Tim Bruns; David Cook	
"I Got Mine"	David Cook; Russell Patrick Davis; Bobby Huff	
"I Love You The End"	David Cook; Sacha Skarbek; Martin Terefe	
"I Wish You Were Here With Me"	David Cook; Tony Martin; Wendell Mobley	
"Impossible You"	David Cook; Hailey Steele	
"I've Said Love"	David Cook; Jerry Flowers; Tom Shapiro	
"Isn't It Enough"	David Cook; Zac Maloy; Tommy Henriksen	
"Let Love In"	David Cook; Brian Howes	
"Lie to Me"	David Cook; Matthew McGinn; Chord Overstreet	
"Little Black Suitcase"	David Cook; Corey Crowder; Rich Redmond	
"Little Goes a Long Way"	David Cook; Kyle Cook; Corey Crowder; Josh Hoge	
"Long Way Home"	Robert Matthew Campbell; David Cook; Justin Haplin	
"Love Is a Liar"	David Cook; David Hodges; Martin Johnson	
"Make Believe"	David Cook	
"Maybe Tonight"	Jude Cole; David Cook; Jason Wade	
"Mouth Breathers"	David Cook; Tommy Henriksen; Cathy Dennis	
"No Reply"	David Cook; Kara DioGuardi; John Fields	
"Now"	David Cook; Chris DeStefano; David Hodges	
"One Second to Change Your Life"	David Cook; Zac Maloy	
"Out of the Shadows"	David Cook; Steven Van Zandt	
"Please Remember Me"	David Cook; Emerson Hart	
"Praying for Redlights"	David Cook; Corey Crowder	
"Remedy"	David Cook; Matthew Bair; Tobias Gad	
"Remember This"	David Cook; Steve McEwan	
"Remembering the Days"	David Cook; Zac Maloy	
"Remind Me"	Jude Cole; David Cook; Jason Wade	
"Rings"	Robert Berryhill; David Cook; Connor Pledger	
"Screaming"	David Cook; Robert Alt; James Durbin; Ryan Star; Gregg Wattenberg	
"Simplicity"	David Cook; Rob Graves; Bobby Hamrick	
"Something Good"	David Cook; Tom Douglas; Zac Maloy	
"Souvenir"	David Cook	
"Stars"	David Cook; Samuel Endicott; David Hodges	
"Start Again"	David Cook; Kevin Griffin; James Moore	
"Stay Awhile"	David Cook; Jarod Cale Dodds	
"Strange and Beautiful"	David Cook; Raine Maide	
"Sunlight"	David Cook; Chris DeStefano; David Hodges	
"Take a Shot"	David Cook; Aaron Eshuis; Bobby Huff	
"Thanks for Everything (It's So Sad)"	David Cook; Kara DioGuardi; John Fields	
"Thanks to You"	David Cook; Kara DioGuardi; John Fields	
"That's All"	David Cook; Ed Roland	
"The Remedy"	Matthew Bair; David Cook; Toby Gad	
"This Year"	David Cook; Jess Cates; David Hodges	
"Tonight is on Our Side"	David Cook; David Hodges	
"True Love"	David Cook; Neil Mason; Steven McMorran	
"U and I"	David Cook; David Hodges	
"Unstoppable"	David Cook	
"Wanted Man"	David Cook; Danny Orton; Jennifer Schott	
"We Are Alive"	David Cook; Chris Lindsey; Aimee Mayo	
"We're Only Honest When We're Sleeping"	David Cook	
"We Had It All"	David Cook; Chantal Kreviazuk; Raine Maida	
"Whatever It Takes"	David Cook; Chantal Kreviazuk; Raine Maida	
"Whatever Takes Tonight"	David Cook; Russell Patrick Davis; Jamie Moore	
"With Me Empty"	David Cook; Neal Tiemann; Andy Skib	
"Wreckless"	David Cook	
"Your Light"	David Cook; Jay Knowles; Trent Summer	

== Cover songs and featured performances ==
David Cook has covered a number of songs during his career. Because Cook has performed some of the covers several times, the year listed for each is the year in which he first performed or released it.

Song	Original Artist(s)	Year	Notes	Ref.
"4am"	Our Lady Peace	2020		
"9 to 5"	Dolly Parton			
"A Long December"	Counting Crows	2014		
"All I Really Need Is You"	Neil Diamond	2008	Performed live in the Top 5 in American Idol	
"All Right Now"	Free	2008	Performed in the Top 20-week in American Idol	
"Always Be My Baby"	Mariah Carey			
"Another Day in Paradise"	Phil Collins	2017	Performed live in Cincinnati, Ohio at The Ludlow Garage. The cover is later recorded and featured as a track on the EP Chromance.	
"Baba O'Riley"	The Who			
"Barracuda"	Heart	2010		
"Billie Jean"	Michael Jackson			
"Bitch"	Meredith Brooks			
"Breathe"	Ryan Starr	2009		
"bury a friend"	Billie Eilish	2020		
"Champagne Supernova"	Oasis			
"Christmas Time Is Here"	Vince Guaraldi Trio	2019		
"Clocks"	Coldplay	2014		
"Colorblind"	Counting Crows			
"Counting Blue Cars"	Dishwalla	2020		
"Creep"	Radiohead	2004	Performed live in Tulsa at The Venue. The live recording is featured in the live album Alive in Tulsa by his rock band Axium.	
"Cult of Personality"	Living Colour	2019		
"Dancing in the Dark"	Bruce Springsteen	2020		
"Danger Zone"	Kenny Loggins	2022		
"Dare You to Move"	Switchfoot			
"Day Is Gone"	Noah Gunderson	2018		
"Day Tripper"	The Beatles			
"Dogman"	King's X		Performed live at Irving Plaza with drummer Jerry Gaskill	
"Don't Give Up"	Ryan Starr	2021		
"Don't Stop Believin'"	Journey	2017		
"Don't You (Forget About Me)"	Duran Duran			
"Dreams"	The Cranberries	2018		
"Eight Days a Week"	The Beatles	2011		
"Eleanor Rigby"	The Beatles			
"Everybody Wants to Rule the World"	Tears for Fears	2014		
"Everyday Is Exactly the Same"	Nine Inch Nails	2009		
"Everlong"	Foo Fighters	2022		
"Fake Plastic Trees"	Radiohead	2021		
"Feliz Navidad"	José Feliciano	2021		
"Fix You"	Coldplay	2019	Performed live at Big Slick in Kansas City with Chris Daughtry	
"Follow You Down"	Gin Blossoms	2022		
"For the First Time"	The Script	2022		
"Free Bird"	Lynyrd Synkyrd	2009		
"Friends in Low Places"	Dewayne Blackwell	2015		
"Grow Old With You"	Adam Sandler	2021		
"Happy Together"	The Turtles			
"Have Yourself a Merry Little Christmas"	Hugh Martin	2021		
"Hello"	Lionel Richie			
"Here I Go Again"	Whitesnake	2011		
"Heroes"	David Bowie	2018		
"Hey Ya!"	Outkast	2020		
"High & Dry"	Radiohead			
"Hold Back the River"	James Bay	2017		
"Hot for Teacher"	Van Halen	2009	Performed live at Biloxi, Mississippi	
"Hunger Strike"	Temple of the Dog	2009		
"Hungry Like the Wolf"	Duran Duran			
"I Can't Make You Love Me"	Bonnie Raitt	2019		
"I Don't Want to Miss a Thing"	Aerosmith			
"I Still Haven't Found What I'm Looking For"	U2			
"I Want It That Way"	Backstreet Boys	2022		
"I'll Be"	Edwin McCain			
"If I Ever Lose My Faith in You"	Sting	2016	Performed live at the Epcot International Food & Wine Festival.	
"In the Meantime"	Spacehog	2011		
"In Your Eyes"	Peter Gabriels	2019	Performed live in Nashville with Kris Allen	
"Innocent"	Our Lady Peace			
"Into the Mystic"	Van Morrison	2022		
"Kansas City"	Wilbert Harrison	2012		
"Kiss You Tonight"	David Nail	2014		
"Last Train Home"	Ryan Star	2009		
"Linger"	The Cranberries	2022		
"Little Lies"	Fleetwood Mac	2008	Performed at the Hard Rock Café in New York.	
"Little Sparrow"	Dolly Parton			
"Livin' on a Prayer"	Bon Jovi			
"Livin' on the Edge"	Aerosmith	2019		
"Love Stinks"	The J. Geils Band	2021		
"Love Will Keep Us Alive"	Eagles	2021		
"Man in the Box"	Alice in Chains	2009		
"Movin' Out (Anthony's Song)"	Billy Joel	2011		
"My Hero"	Foo Fighters	2008		
"O Holy Night"	Adolphe Adam	2021		
"Ode to My Family"	The Cranberries	2022		
"Outnumbered"	Dermot Kennedy	2022		
"Panama"	Van Halen	2015		
"Pride and Joy"	Stevie Ray Vaughan and Double Trouble	2016		
"Purple Rain"	Prince	2016		
"Right Now"	Van Halen	2018		
"Rock and Roll"	Led Zeppelin	2011		
"Rolling in the Deep"	Adele	2011		
"Runnin' Down a Dream"	Tom Petty	2014		
"Secret Garden"	Bruce Springsteen	2015		
"Separate Ways (Worlds Apart)"	Journey			
"Shattered Dreams"	Johnny Hates Jazz	2009	Performed live at the San Diego County Fair.	
"Sledgehammer"	Peter Gabriel	2022		
"Slow Ride Take It Easy"	Foghat	2011		
"Somewhere Only We Know"	Keane	2020		
"Starman"	David Bowie	2016		
"Stockholm Syndrome"	Muse	2011		
"Sweet Home Alabama"	Lynyrd Synkyrd	2014		
"The Blower's Daughter"	Damien Rice	2021		
"The Chain"	Fleetwood Mac	2017	Performed live at Jammin' Java in Vienna, Virginia.	
"The Dance"	Tony Arata	2016		
"The First Time Ever I Saw Your Face"	Peggy Seeger			
"The Freshmen"	The Verve Pipe	2020		
"The Hand That Feeds"	Nine Inch Nails	2011		
"The Heart of the Matter"	Don Henley	2019		
"The Man Who Sold the World"	David Bowie	2021		
"The Middle"	Jimmy Eat World	2020		
"The Music of the Night"	Michael Crawford			
"The Night Santa Went Crazy"	Weird Al Yankovic	2020		
"The Pretender"	Foo Fighters	2017		
"The World I Know"	Collective Soul	2009		
"This Is How We Do It"	Montell Jordan	2017		
"To Be With You"	Mr. Big			
"Tonight You Belong to Me"	Irving Kaufman	2020		
"Twelve Days of Christmas"	Bob and Doug McKenzie	2020		
"Uninvited"	Alanis Morissette	2020		
"Wake Me Up When September Ends"	Green Day	2020		
"Whole Lotta Love"	Led Zeppelin			
"Wicked Game"	Chris Isaak			
"With or Without You"	U2	2021		
"You're Still the One"	Shania Twain	2021		

== Original songs performed by other artists ==
Cook has written several songs, but only a few are recorded by other artists. The track "No Reply" was written and originally intended to be featured in Cook's self-titled debut album, but the track was later sent to Frankie Negrón and was recorded and released as a single in 2010, where the track was later included in the album Independence Day.

In 2014, Cook wrote the track "Kiss You Tonight", along with writers Jay Knowles and Trent Summer, for country artist David Nail, which was released as the second single for the album I'm a Fire. This was the third song Cook wrote for himself after relocating to Nashville in 2012, but he felt that the song didn't suit him. Summer recorded the demo and was sent to Joe Fisher at UMG who put it on hold for David Nail.

Song	Performer(s)	Writer(s)	Album	Year
"No Reply"	Frankie Negrón	David Cook; Kara DioGuardi; John Fields	Independence Day (Deluxe Edition)	2010
"Screaming"	James Durbin	James Durbin; David Cook; Bobby Alt; Gregg Wattenberg; Ryan Star	Memories of a Beautiful Disaster	2011
"Stars"	Arrows to Athens	David Cook; Samuel Endicott; David Hodges	Kings & Thieves	2011
"Kiss You Tonight"	David Nail	David Cook; Jay Knowles; Trent Summar	I'm a Fire	2014
"Firing Squad"	Arrows to Athens	David Cook; David Hodges; Steven Miller	Exile – EP	2016
