= Logan Brill =

American singer-songwriter

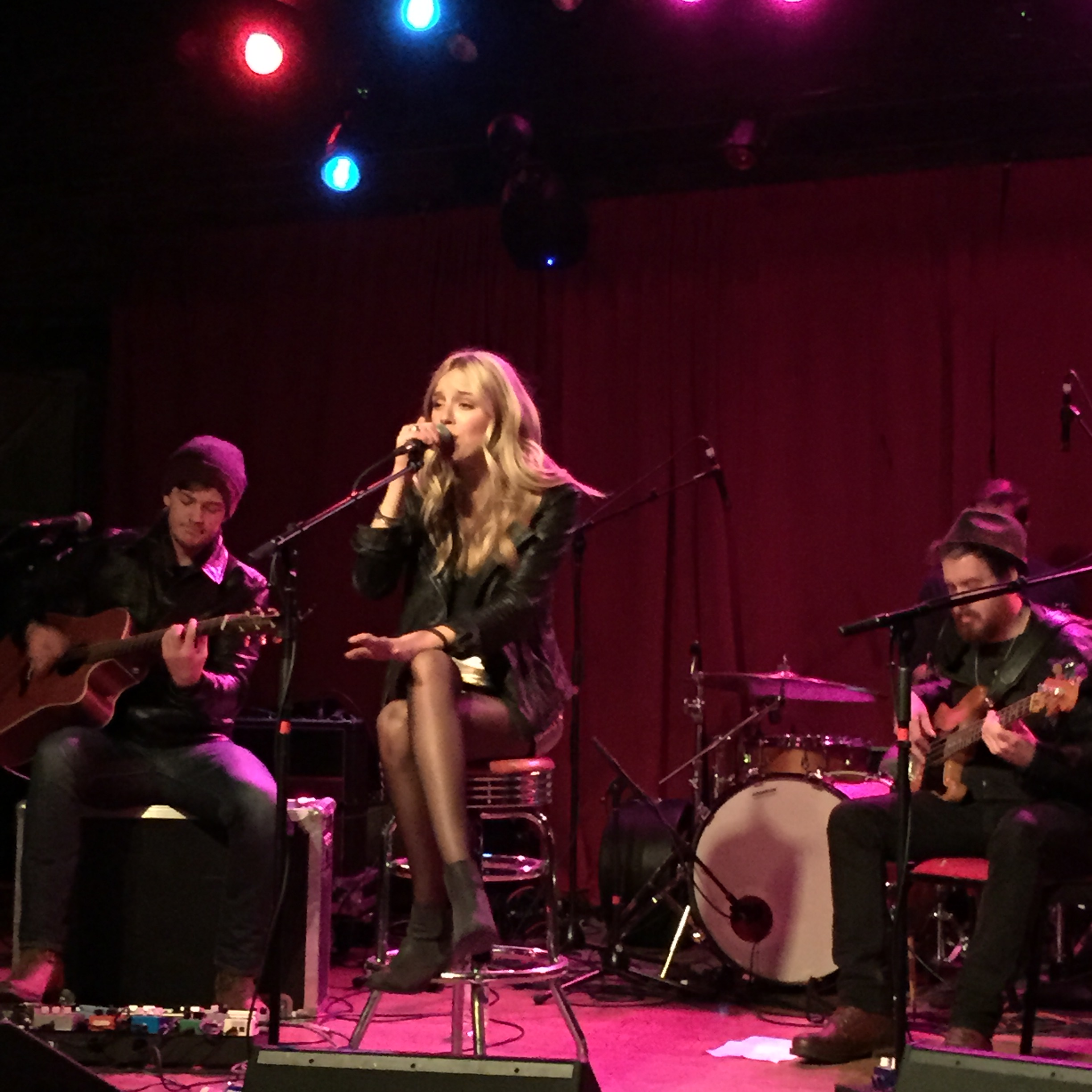

Background information
- Birth name: Katherine Logan Brill
- Born: Knoxville, Tennessee, U.S.
- Occupation(s): Singer, songwriter
- Labels: Carnival Music
- Website: loganbrill.com Logan Brill discography at MusicBrainz

Katherine Logan Brill is an American singer and songwriter from Knoxville, Tennessee. She currently writes for Carnival Music and released her debut album, Walking Wires (Carnival Recording Company), in October 2013. Her musical style has been described as a combination of country, roots, blues, and Americana.

== Biography ==
Born in Knoxville, Tennessee, Brill was exposed to a variety of music growing up: artists such as Jackson Browne, the Grateful Dead, Stevie Ray Vaughan, and Patty Griffin. While none of her family were professional musicians, they were all music lovers. After dinner they would frequently have family "jam sessions." In her teens, Brill continued to expand musically by playing in her brother's jazz band.

At 18, she moved to Nashville, Tennessee, to pursue an education at Belmont University. Not wanting to limit herself to music, she earned a degree in French with a minor in vocal performance. After a friend introduced her to workers at Carnival Music, Brill signed with the label in early 2012.

Brill's debut album, Walking Wires, was released on October 15, 2013. It features ten tracks and was produced by Oran Thorton and Matthew Miller.

Two of her songs have been featured on the VH1 reality show, Couples Therapy. "Scars" was featured on season four (episode six), "Rewind" was featured on season 4 (episode 3). Both are included on Walking Wires. She also recorded and a released the single, "Wailing Wall", in a partnership with Massachusetts-based charity organization, Montachusett Veterans' Outreach Center, drawing attention to women Veterans' issues with proceeds of sales benefiting MVOC.

Logan has appeared since her release on sold-out bills in markets from Nashville to Chicago to Washington, DC, including acoustic opening spots with artists like Steve Earle, Josh Turner, Jerry Douglas, Leon Russell, Ashley Monroe, Gary Allan, and Todd Snider, as well as with her band at national concert events like Virginia Beach's Patriotic Festival with The Band Perry and Cincinnati's first annual Buckle Up Festival with headliners Alison Krauss, Willie Nelson, & David Nail.

Brill released her second album, Shuteye, on June 2, 2015, and it sold 1,100 copies on its debut week. She also performed at North Carolina's famed roots festival, Merlefest, California's largest Country Music Festival, Stagecoach, making her Grand Ole Opry debut, and touring appearances with icons Merle Haggard and Dwight Yoakam.

== Critical reception ==
The Nashville Sound rated Walking Wires as its 6th best album of the year. They added "The minute the album starts out with the outstanding track,'There's No Such Things As Ghosts,' the listener recognizes the power in the album. The sound is fresh and the lyrics are poignant. At only 22, her storytelling belies her age. The depth of the emotions conveyed through the performances relate well to her soulful voice, particularly when singing of loss and heartache."

CMA Close Up Magazine featured Brill in its "debut spotlight" section in November 2013. They said Brill "mixes earthy and ethereal narratives with sharp storytelling. Edge and energy frame her elegant sense of lyric."

Country Weekly advised its readers to "Check out this premiere of the melancholy 'Rewind'".

== Discography ==
=== Albums ===
Title	Album details	Peak chart positions	
Title	Album details	US Country	US Heat
Walking Wires	Release date: October 15, 2013; Label: Carnival Recording Company	—	—
Shuteye	Release date: June 2, 2015; Label: Carnival Recording Company	37	19
"—" denotes releases that did not chart

=== Music videos ===
Year	Video	Director
2015	"World Still Round"	Preston Leatherman
2016	"Shuteye"	Preston Leatherman
