= Room to Breathe (Reba McEntire album) =

Studio album by Reba McEntire
- Released: November 18, 2003
- Studios: Starstruck Studios (Nashville, Tennessee)
- Genre: Country
- Length: 44:31
- Label: MCA Nashville
- Producers: Buddy Cannon; Reba McEntire; Norro Wilson

Reba McEntire chronology
20th Century Masters – The Christmas Collection: The Best of Reba (2003)	Room to Breathe (2003)	Reba #1's (2005)

Singles from Room to Breathe
- 1. "I'm Gonna Take That Mountain" Released: August 25, 2003; 2. "Somebody" Released: January 17, 2004; 3. "He Gets That from Me" Released: September 4, 2004; 4. "My Sister" Released: March 19, 2005

Room to Breathe is the twenty-fifth studio album by American country music singer Reba McEntire. It was released on November 18, 2003, by MCA Nashville Records. It was produced by Buddy Cannon, McEntire, and Norro Wilson.

Room to Breathe was McEntire's first album of new recordings since 1999's So Good Together and her first studio album of the new millennium. McEntire had previously branched into theater and television, starring in a television sitcom, Reba, and had decided to temporarily leave the recording industry at the start of the new millennium. The release contained McEntire's first number one single in six years with "Somebody", while also hosting three additional singles between 2003 and 2005.

== Background ==
Room to Breathe was recorded in Nashville Tennessee in 2003 and consists of twelve tracks. About.com album reviewer, Matt Bjorke referred to the album as "a competent collection of well written, fun and emotional tunes. In essence, it's a return to form for Reba and should prove to be a critical and commercial success." Marshall Bowden of PopMatters considered McEntire's release to contain "more traditional-sounding material", exemplifying tracks such as "I'm Gonna Take My Mountain" and "Love Revival" to evoke this sound. The album was goaled to mainly showcase the different musical styles McEntire had utilized. For this, Bowden praised McEntire and producers, stating that, "McEntire, together with producers Buddy Cannon and Norro Wilson, has done a good job of presenting a variety of sounds. For some, the result will be too diverse and lack focus, but if McEntire can do all of these styles convincingly, why shouldn’t she?"

Some of the material on Room to Breathe included "story songs", such as "He Gets That from Me", which was recorded in memory of individuals who lost family members in the 2001 September 11 Attacks. Another track, "Moving Oleta" explains how an elderly man is forced to move his wife to a nursing home. Certain tracks included background vocals from country artist, Linda Davis. McEntire also collaborated with another country artist, Vince Gill for the closing track, "It Just Has to Be This Way", whom AllMusic reviewer, Maria Konicki Dinoia compared to McEntire's and Gill's number one duet single, "The Heart Won't Lie."

== Critical reception ==
Professional ratings
Review scores
Source	Rating
About.com	5/5 stars
AllMusic	3/5 stars

Matt Bjorke of About.com gave Room to Breathe five out of five stars, saying, "When you add up the performances throughout the duration of Room To Breathe, Reba has created her best and most personal album yet. With truly something for every country fan, the album is sure to become a big hit with old and new fans alike." Allmusic's Maria Konicki Dinoia gave the album three out of five stars. Even though she gave the album a lower rating, she gave much praise to effort, calling the album to sound, "revitalizing" and show a "cool Reba." Dinoia gave praise to the traditional sound of the album, saying, "On her first studio album in four years, she resurrects her passion for country music that seemed to have been missing on her previous album." Marshall Bowden of PopMatters also found Room to Breathe to also have a more traditional approach to it, comparing it to the sound of country music in the 1970s.

== Commercial performance ==
The lead single from the album, "I'm Gonna Take That Mountain", was released in summer 2003 and peaked in the Hot Country Songs Top 20 at #14. Room to Breathe was officially released November 18, 2003, reaching #4 on the Billboard Top Country Albums chart and peaking at #25 on the Billboard 200 all-genres list with first week sales of 72,297, spending four weeks on the chart, making its last appearance there in January 2004. The album's second single was released in 2004; "Somebody" reached #1 on the Hot Country Songs chart and #35 on the Billboard Hot 100. It was followed by "He Gets That from Me" later in the year, which reached a peak of #7 and the fourth single, "My Sister", reached #16. In August 2005, Room to Breathe was certified platinum by the Recording Industry Association of America.

== Track listing ==
No.	Title	Writer(s)	Length
1.	"Secret"	Lisa Brokop; Ron Harbin; Cyril Rawson	3:22
2.	"If I Had Any Sense Left at All"	Hank Cochran; Dale Dodson; Red Lane	4:00
3.	"My Sister"	Bonnie Baker; Amy Dalley; Roxie Dean	3:59
4.	"Once You've Learned to Be Lonely"	Candy Cameron; Chip Davis; Sharon Vaughn	4:28
5.	"Moving Oleta"	Barry Dean	3:27
6.	"Love Revival"	Marc Harris; Leslie Satcher	4:07
7.	"He Gets That from Me"	Steven Dale Jones; Phillip White	3:38
8.	"I'm Gonna Take That Mountain"	Melissa Peirce; Jerry Salley	3:24
9.	"Room to Breathe"	D. Vincent Williams; Vicky McGehee	3:31
10.	"Sky Full of Angels"	Burton Banks Collins; Clay Mills; Lisa Stewart	2:51
11.	"Somebody"	Dave Berg; Annie Tate; Sam Tate	3:50
12.	"It Just Has to Be This Way" (with Vince Gill)	Liz Hengber; James Dean Hicks; Anthony L. Smith	3:48

== Personnel ==
=== Musicians ===
- Reba McEntire – vocals
- John Hobbs – acoustic piano (1, 3–6, 8, 9), synthesizers (2, 7), Hammond B3 organ (11)
- Randy McCormick – synthesizers (1, 4, 9), acoustic piano (2, 7, 11), Hammond B3 organ (3, 6, 8, 12)
- Gary Prim – keyboards (2, 9)
- Steve Nathan – acoustic piano (12)
- J.T. Corenflos – electric guitar (1, 3, 4)
- B. James Lowry – acoustic guitar (1–4, 6–12), nylon string guitar (2, 5)
- Gregg Galbraith – electric guitar (2), nylon string guitar (7)
- John Jorgenson – electric guitar (2, 5–10, 12), mandolin (11)
- Dann Huff – electric guitar (3, 12)
- Dan Tyminski – acoustic guitar (8), mandolin (8)
- Dan Dugmore – lap steel guitar (1, 6), steel guitar (2–4, 7, 9, 12), acoustic guitar (10), dobro (10, 11)
- David Talbot – banjo (8)
- Rob Ickes – dobro (8)
- Larry Paxton – bass guitar, string arrangements (5)
- Paul Leim – drums, percussion (1, 3, 4, 6–8, 10, 11)
- Alison Krauss – fiddle (3)
- Larry Franklin – fiddle (8)
- Kristin Wilkinson – string arrangements (5)
- The Nashville String Machine – strings (5)
- Eberhard Ramm – music copyist (5)

Background and Guest vocalists

- Chip Davis – backing vocals (1, 9)
- Linda Davis – backing vocals (1–3, 7, 11)
- Lisa Cochran – backing vocals (2)
- Marabeth Jordan – backing vocals (2)
- Louis Nunley – backing vocals (2, 10)
- Bergen White – backing vocals (2)
- Curtis Wright – backing vocals (2, 8, 11)
- Reba McEntire – backing vocals (3)
- Alison Krauss – backing vocals (4)
- Dan Tyminski – backing vocals (4)
- Bob Bailey – backing vocals (6, 10)
- Kim Fleming – backing vocals (6)
- Vicki Hampton – backing vocals (6)
- Sonya Isaacs – backing vocals (8)
- Dennis Wilson – backing vocals (10)
- Vince Gill – vocals (12)

=== Production and Technical ===
- Buddy Cannon – producer
- Reba McEntire – producer
- Norro Wilson – producer
- Billy Sherrill – recording
- John Guess – mixing
- J.R. Rodriguez – recording assistant, mix assistant
- Todd Tidwell – recording assistant
- Patrick Murphy – mix assistant
- Tony Castle – additional engineer
- Hank Williams – mastering at MasterMix (Nashville, Tennessee)
- Shannon Finnegan – project coordinator
- Bethany Newman – art direction, design
- Ron Davis – photography
- Michelle Moder – wardrobe
- Brett Freedman – hair stylist
- Terri Apanasewicz – make-up
- Narvel Blackstock for Starstruck Entertainment – representation

== Charts ==
=== Weekly charts ===
Chart (2003)	Peak position
Australian Albums (ARIA)	176
US Billboard 200	25
US Top Country Albums (Billboard)	4

=== Year-end charts ===
Chart (2004)	Position
US Top Country Albums (Billboard)	23
Chart (2005)	Position
US Top Country Albums (Billboard)	39

=== Singles ===
Year	Song	Chart positions	
Year	Song	US Country	US
2003	"I'm Gonna Take That Mountain"	14	103
2004	"Somebody"	1	35
2004	"He Gets That from Me"	7	59
2005	"My Sister"	16	93
"—" denotes releases that did not chart.

== Certifications and sales ==
Region	Certification	Certified units/sales
United States (RIAA)	Platinum	1,000,000^{^}
^{^} Shipments figures based on certification alone.
