= Hultquist =

Hultquist is a surname. Notable people with the surname include:

- Derik Hultquist, American singer-songwriter
- Gordon Hultquist (1904–1941), New Zealand politician
- Ian Hultquist (born 1985), American composer and musician
- Sofia Hultquist (born 1986), Italian composer and musician

== See also ==
- John Hultquist House
