= Melissa Peirce =

American songwriter (born 1975)

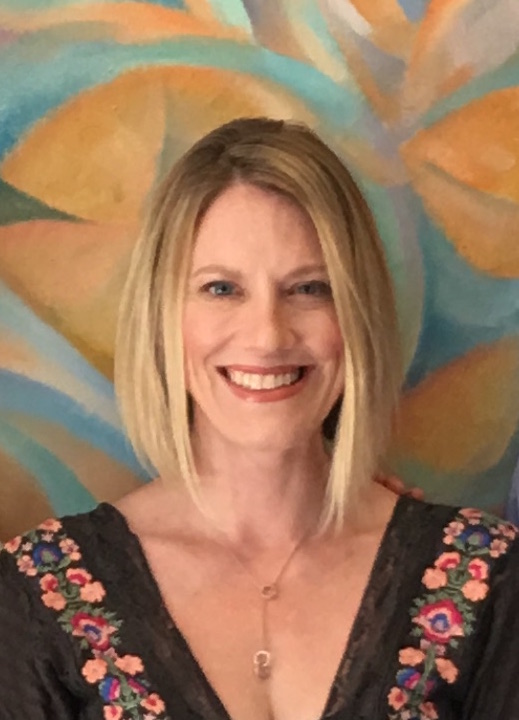
- Peirce in 2017

Background information
- Born: Melissa Ann Peirce; 1975 (age 50–51); Bucks County, Pennsylvania, United States
- Genres: Country and Pop
- Occupations: Singer; songwriter
- Instruments: Vocals, piano
- Years active: 2003–present
- Label: Disney Music

Melissa Peirce (born 1975) is an American country and pop music songwriter based in Nashville, Tennessee.

== Early life and education ==
Peirce was born and raised in Bucks County, Pennsylvania. She moved to Nashville at age 18, and enrolled in Belmont University. She worked at Giant Records as an A&R assistant while writing songs at night, before joining Malaco Music Group as a songwriter.

== Career ==
In 2004, Peirce won an ASCAP Award for writing Reba McEntire's "I'm Gonna Take That Mountain", launching her career. She co-wrote the Tyler Farr song "A Guy Walks Into a Bar", which reached number 1 on the Billboard Country Airplay chart. The song also reached number 7 on the Billboard Hot Country Songs chart, number 51 on the Billboard Hot 100, and was named one of 11 Songs I Wish I'd Written at the 2015 Nashville Songwriters Hall of Fame ceremony. She has written singles including David Nail's "Red Light", which reached number 7 on the Billboard Country Airplay chart, Eli Young Band's "Say Goodnight" and Lady Antebellum's "Hurt". Her songs have also been recorded by Garth Brooks, Carrie Underwood, LeAnn Rimes, Joss Stone, Keith Urban and Olivia Holt.

Since 2012, she has been signed to Disney Music Publishing.

== Personal life ==
Peirce is married to Your Guitar Sage Course Teacher Erich Andreas.

== Awards ==
- ASCAP Country Music Award for "I'm Gonna Take That Mountain", 2004
- BMI Country Music Award for "Red Light", 2010
- NSAI Award for 10 Songs I Wish I Had Written, "A Guy Walks Into a Bar", 2015
- BMI Country Music Award for "A Guy Walks Into a Bar", 2016

== Discography ==
=== Albums ===
Title	Album details
Lonesome Lullaby	Released: July 30, 2008; Formats: CD, digital download
Blend (EP)	Released: 2010; Formats: Digital download

=== As songwriter ===
Year	Artist	Album	Song	Credit
2003	Chalee Tennison	Parading In the Rain	"Lonesome Road"	Writer
2003	Doc Walker	Everyone Aboard	"I Am Ready"	Writer
2003	Reba McEntire	Room to Breathe	"I'm Gonna Take That Mountain"	Writer
2003	Bella	Tumblin' Down	"Tumblin' Down"	Writer
2004	Malibu Storm	Malibu Storm	"Long Way to Fall"	Writer
2005	LeAnn Rimes	This Woman	"Won't Be Lonely Long"	Writer
2005	Carrie Underwood	Some Hearts	"That's Where It Is"	Writer
2006	Maia Sharp	Eve and the Red Delicious	"The Edge"	Writer
2007	Travis Meadows	My Life 101	"Don't Wanna Let You Down"	Writer
2008	Phil Stacey	Phil Stacey	"You Are Mine"	Writer
2008	John Paul White	The Long Goodbye	"Come Over"	Writer
2008	John Paul White	The Long Goodbye	"Over My Head"	Writer
2008	John Paul White	The Long Goodbye	"Losing Me"	Writer
2009	David Nail	I'm About to Come Alive	"Red Light"	Writer
2010	Jonathan Singleton & the Grove	Jonathan Singleton & the Grove	"Probably Just Time"	Writer
2010	Richard Page	Peculiar Life	"You Are Mine"	Writer
2010	Mindy McCready	I'm Still Here	"Fades"	Writer
2011	Jeff Bates	One Day Closer	"The Rapture"	Writer
2011	Shelly Fairchild	Ruby's Money	"Try the Truth"	Writer
2011	Shelly Fairchild	Ruby's Money	"Love Everybody"	Writer
2011	Travis Meadows	Killing Uncle Buzzy	"Pray For Jungleland"	Writer
2011	Joss Stone	LP1	"Don't Start Lyin' to Me Now"	Writer
2011	Randy Montana	Randy Montana	"Goodbye Rain"	Writer
2011	Eli Young Band	Life at Best	"Say Goodnight"	Writer
2012	Marty Raybon		"Dirt Road Heartache"	Writer
2012	Chris Cagle	Back in the Saddle	"Probably Just Time"	Writer
2013	Travis Meadows	Old Ghosts and Unfinished Business	"Good Girl"	Writer
2013	Michelle Wright	Strong	"Strong"	Writer
2013	Matt Wertz	Heatwave	"Get to You"	Writer
2013	Felicia Barton		"The Real Thing (Kiss the Girl)"	Writer
2014	Emerson Hart	Beauty in Disrepair	"Don't Forget Yourself"	Writer
2014	Hunter Hayes	Storyline	"Still Fallin"	Writer
2014	Bea Miller		"Open Your Eyes"	Writer
2014	Lucy Hale	Road Between	"Goodbye Gone"	Writer
2014	Lucy Hale	Road Between	"Lie a Little Better"	Writer
2014	Lucy Hale	Road Between	"Road Between"	Writer
2014	Emily West	I Hate You I Love You	"My Story"	Writer
2014	Neal Carpenter	Good Guys	"Lonely is a Hell of a Drug"	Writer
2014	Neal Carpenter	Good Guys	"Borrowed Things"	Writer
2014	Lucy Hale		"Mistletoe"	Writer
2014	Garth Brooks	Man Against Machine	"Midnight Train"	Writer
2014	Garth Brooks	Man Against Machine	"Cold Like That"	Writer
2014	Olivia Holt	Bears soundtrack	"Carry On"	Writer
2015	Elenowen	For the Taking	"For the Taking"	Writer
2015	Rachel Potter	Not So Black and White	"Tail Lights"	Writer
2015	Striking Matches	Nothing But the Silence	"Miss Me More"	Writer
2015	Tyler Farr	Suffer in Peace	"A Guy Walks Into a Bar"	Writer
2015	Star Darlings		"Wish Now"	Writer
2015	Jason Blaine	Country Side	"Back to You"	Writer
2017	Jerry Salley	New Songs, Old Friends	"I'm Gonna Take That Mountain"	Writer
2017	Lindsey Ell	Standing Here	"Worth the Wait"	Writer
2017	Jordan Fisher and Angie Keilhauer		"Happily Ever After"	Writer
2017	Lady Antebellum	Heart Break	"Hurt"	Writer
