= Fighter (David Nail album) =

Studio album by David Nail
- Released: July 15, 2016
- Studio: Back Stage Studio, The House, The Q Room, Sputnik Sound and The Casino (Nashville, Tennessee); Plantation Studios (Charleston, South Carolina); Stonehurst Studio (Bowling Green, Kentucky)
- Genre: Country
- Length: 42:46
- Label: MCA Nashville
- Producer: Chuck Ainlay; Frank Liddell; Glenn Worf

David Nail chronology
I'm a Fire (2014)	Fighter (2016)

Singles from Fighter
- 1. "Night's on Fire" Released: July 20, 2015; 2. "Good at Tonight" Released: September 12, 2016

Fighter is the fourth studio album by American country music artist David Nail. It was released on July 15, 2016, via MCA Nashville. It includes the singles "Night's on Fire" and "Good at Tonight", a duet with Brothers Osborne.

== Track listing ==
No.	Title	Writer(s)	Length
1.	"Good at Tonight" (featuring Brothers Osborne)	TJ Osborne; John Osborne; Troy Verges; Barry Dean	3:30
2.	"Night's on Fire"	Jonathan Singleton; Deric Ruttan	3:10
3.	"Ease Your Pain"	Chris Stapleton; Lee Thomas Miller; Jesse Frasure	2:59
4.	"Home" (featuring Lori McKenna)	David Nail; Lori McKenna	5:56
5.	"Lie with Me"	Abe Stoklasa; Marc Beeson	2:50
6.	"I Won't Let You Go" (featuring Vince Gill)	Nail	5:32
7.	"Fighter"	Nail; Scooter Carusoe; Troy Verges	4:36
8.	"Babies"	Nail; Carusoe; Miller	3:25
9.	"Got Me Gone"	Nail; Dave Barnes; Singleton	3:12
10.	"Champagne Promise" (featuring Logan Brill)	Nail; Miller	3:54
11.	"Old Man's Symphony" (featuring Bear Rinehart and Bo Rinehart of Needtobreathe)	Nail	3:42
Total length:			42:46

== Reception ==
The album debuted on Billboard 200 at No. 26 on its release, as well as No. 3 on the Top Country Albums, selling 12,200 copies in its first week. It has sold 20,100 copies in the US as of September 2016.

== Personnel ==
Musicians

- David Nail – lead vocals
- Mike Rojas – accordion (1), synthesizers (1, 7, 10), acoustic piano (6, 7, 10), keyboards (9)
- Reed Pittman – acoustic piano (4)
- Jerry McPherson – electric guitars (1, 2, 4, 6, 7, 9, 10)
- Ilya Toshinsky – acoustic guitars (1, 2, 4), mandolin (1), banjo (2), electric guitars (6, 7, 9, 10)
- Jonathan Singleton – acoustic guitars (2), backing vocals (2)
- Chris Coleman – electric guitars (3, 5), drums (3, 5), percussion (3, 5, 11), backing vocals (3), keyboards (5), bass (5), Wurlitzer electric piano (8), trumpet (8)
- Todd Lombardo – acoustic guitars (3, 5, 8, 11), electric guitars (3, 5, 8, 11)
- Derek Wells – acoustic guitars (3, 5, 8, 11), electric guitars (3, 5, 8, 11)
- Paul Franklin – steel guitar (4)
- Glenn Worf – bass (1, 2, 4, 6, 7, 9, 10)
- Jerry Roe – bass (3, 8, 11)
- Chris McHugh – drums (1, 2, 4, 6–11), percussion (2, 8–10)
- Sam Levine – saxophones (6)
- Bill Woodworth – oboe (7)
- Roy Agee – trombone (6)
- Mike Haynes – trumpet (6)
- Chris Carmichael – strings (11), string arrangements (11)
- John Osborne – handclaps (1), backing vocals (1)
- T.J. Osborne – handclaps (1), backing vocals (1)
- Lori McKenna – backing vocals (4)
- Abe Stoklasa – backing vocals (5)
- Vince Gill – backing vocals (6)
- Gene Miller – backing vocals (7)
- Sarah Buxton – backing vocals (9)
- Logan Brill – backing vocals (10)
- Bear Rinehart – backing vocals (11)
- Bo Rinehart – backing vocals (11)

Production

- Brian Wright – A&R
- Frank Liddell – producer
- Glenn Worf – producer (1, 2, 4, 6, 7, 9, 10)
- Chuck Ainlay – producer (1, 2, 4, 6, 7, 9, 10), recording (1, 2, 4, 6, 7, 9, 10), mixing (1, 2, 4, 6, 7, 9, 10)
- Eric Masse – recording (3, 5, 8, 11), mixing (3, 5, 8, 11)
- Mike McCarthy – recording (3, 5, 8, 11)
- Kam Luchterhand – assistant engineer (1, 2, 4, 6, 7, 9, 10)
- Matt Rausch – assistant engineer (1, 2, 4, 6, 7, 9, 10)
- Brandon Schexnayder – assistant engineer (1, 2, 4, 6, 7, 9, 10)
- Kohen Terry – recording assistant (3, 5, 8, 11)
- Neil B. Young – additional recording (3, 5, 8, 11)
- Chris McHugh – digital editing and programming at Boom4Real (Nashville, Tennessee)
- Bob Ludwig – mastering (1, 2, 4, 6, 7, 9, 10)
- Adam Ayan – mastering (3, 5, 8, 11)
- Gateway Mastering (Portland, Maine) – mastering location
- Brittany Hamlin – production coordinator
- David Nail – art direction
- Karen Naff – art direction
- Craig Allen – design
- Jim Wright – photography
- Lindsay Doyle – grooming
- Anna Redmon – wardrobe stylist
- Brian Wolf for Maverick – management

== Chart performance ==
=== Album ===
Chart (2016)	Peak position
US Billboard 200	26
US Top Country Albums (Billboard)	3

=== Singles ===
Year	Single	Peak chart positions			
Year	Single	US Country	US Country Airplay	US	CAN Country
2015	"Night's on Fire"	17	14	81	39
2016	"Good at Tonight"	—	52	—	—
