= Mando Saenz =

American singer

- Occupation: Singer-songwriter
- Labels: Carnival Recording Company
- Website: mandosaenzmusic.com

Mando Saenz is an American singer-songwriter living in Nashville, Tennessee. He has released four albums, all on the Carnival Music label: Watertown (2005), Bucket (2008), Studebaker (2013) and All My Shame (2021). Saenz's songs have been recorded by a wide range of artists, including Miranda Lambert, Midland, The Oak Ridge Boys, Jim Lauderdale Eli Young Band, Whiskey Myers, Stoney LaRue, Wade Bowen, Lee Ann Womack, Aubrie Sellers, Jack Ingram, Kim Richey, and Shelly Colvin.

== Biography ==
Saenz was born in San Luis Potosí, Mexico, but was moved to Fort Bragg, North Carolina at three months old. By the time Mando reached the fourth grade, his family would move to San Francisco, a little town in Oklahoma, and finally to Corpus Christi, Texas, where his father, recently retired from the U.S. Army, set up a medical practice. His family was very musical and his parents encouraged him to play, exposing him to a wide range of musical styles. As a result, he began taking guitar lessons in his early teens.

After graduation, Saenz enrolled at Texas Tech and later earned an MBA while living in San Antonio. Degree in hand, Saenz found the call to create music too strong to ignore. When he chose a move to Houston over Austin because his brother set up a studio in the former, he was exposed to another world. "It was a good time to be a musician in Houston. A lot of us, like Hayes Carll and John Evans, were there together. I was in inner-city Houston, and it was just so cool—huge and unlike anywhere I’d ever lived." In Houston, Saenz began playing local open mic nights and cutting his teeth with other up and coming musicians like Hayes Carll, Slaid Cleaves, and John Evans. His biggest break came when he was discovered by award-winning country music producer Frank Liddell (Miranda Lambert, Eli Young Band, David Nail, Stoney LaRue). Liddell signed Saenz as one of the founding artists to his company and the first to be signed to both a publishing contract (Carnival Music) and record deal (Carnival Recording Company) in Nashville, Tennessee.

After moving to Nashville in 2006, Saenz released three albums with Carnival Recording Company, Watertown in 2005, Bucket in 2008, and 2013's Studebaker. Studebaker, released June 4, 2013, was produced by Mark Nevers (Lambchop, Bobby Bare, Jr., Andrew Bird). Kenny Vaughan, Pete Finney, Jedd Hughes, Kim Richey, and Bobby Bare, Jr., all made cameo appearances on the record.

Saenz also has written songs with and for a large number of artists. Saenz co-wrote every track save one on Stoney LaRue’s 2011 album Velvet—which scored three No. 1 singles on the Texas Music Chart—along with all of the songs on Shelly Colvin's Up the Hickory, Down the Pine, which features her recording of "Pocket Change". Wade Bowen's recording of "Bottle into Gold", which he wrote with Saenz, hit No. 1 on the Texas Music Chart. Miranda Lambert, Midland (band), Lee Ann Womack Eli Young Band, Whiskey Myers, and more also joined Saenz's growing list of collaborators, while others such as The Oak Ridge Boys have rediscovered and recorded his work.

Saenz has also done background vocals for a number of artists including Miranda Lambert, Stoney LaRue, and Kim Richey.

== Critical reception ==
Roughstock Country gave Studebaker 4 out of 5 stars, calling it an "intoxicating slew of tracks." They added "Mando Saenz is a troubadour in the best sense of the word and throughout Studebaker he showcases everything we've come to love about strong songwriting and melody-rich Country/Roots music."

PopMatters.com gave Studebaker a 7 out of 10, calling it a "blend of Texas and Nashville...that upholds the troubadour tradition in fine fashion"

Saenz was featured in Country Weekly's "On The Edge" August 2013 edition.

== Discography ==
=== Albums ===
| Year | Title | Label |
|---|---|---|
| 2005 | Watertown | Carnival Recording Company |
| 2008 | Bucket | Carnival Recording Company |
| 2013 | Studebaker | Carnival Recording Company |
| 2021 | All My Shame | Carnival Recording Company |

=== Music videos ===
| Year | Video | Director |
|---|---|---|
| 2014 | "Pocket Change" | Steve Condon |
