= Whatever She's Got =

Single by David Nail

from the album I'm a Fire
- Released: May 28, 2013
- Recorded: 2013
- Genre: Country, country pop
- Length: 3:57
- Label: MCA Nashville
- Songwriters: Jimmy Robbins; Jon Nite
- Producers: Chuck Ainlay; Frank Liddell; Glenn Worf

David Nail singles chronology
"Someone Like You" (2012)	"Whatever She's Got" (2013)	"Kiss You Tonight" (2014)

Music video
- "Whatever She's Got" on YouTube

"Whatever She's Got" is a song recorded by American country music artist David Nail. It was released in May 2013 as the first single from Nail's third studio album, I'm a Fire. The album was released on March 4, 2014. The song was written by Jimmy Robbins and Jon Nite.

The song was popular for its catchy lyrics. "Whatever She's Got" peaked at number one on the US Billboard Country Airplay chart, giving Nail his second number-one country hit overall. It also charted at numbers 2 and 35 on the Hot Country Songs and Hot 100 charts respectively. The song was certified triple Platinum by the Recording Industry Association of America (RIAA), denoting sales of over three million units in that country. The song also charted in Canada at number 4 on the Country chart and number 34 on the Canadian Hot 100.

The accompanying music video was directed by Chris Hicky and follows a couple's romantic escapade with Nail performing at a rooftop party with his band.

== Critical reception ==
Billy Dukes of Taste of Country gave the song two and half stars out of five. Dukes called the song "pop-friendly and not nearly as deep" compared to Nail's previous singles and wrote that "banjo and electric guitar noodling keep flashbacks of 'N Sync out of one's head, but the there [sic] are few lyrics that deliver a punch to remember." Matt Bjorke of Roughstock gave the song four stars out of five, saying that "the production is contemporary as the melody and lyric warrant but for as country/pop [as] 'Whatever She's Got' feels, it isn't so 'pop' as to think it wouldn't play well within country radio." Bjorke also stated that "the lyrics, the melody and David Nail's vocal all work together to make the song a memorable song."

== Chart and sales performance ==
"Whatever She's Got" debuted at number 51 on the U.S. Billboard Country Airplay chart for the week of June 15, 2013. It also debuted at number 43 on the U.S. Billboard Hot Country Songs chart for the week of July 6, 2013 where it peaked at No. 2 on chart dated February 8, 2014. It also debuted at number 91 on the U.S. Billboard Hot 100 chart for the week of October 19, 2013, and peaked on this chart at No. 35 for the chart dated February 22, 2014. The song was certified triple Platinum by the RIAA on May 26, 2026, and has sold 1,157,000 copies in the U.S. as of June 2014.

The song also debuted at number 95 on the Canadian Hot 100 chart for the week of November 30, 2013, and peaked at No. 34 for the chart dated March 1, 2014.

== Music video ==
The music video was directed by Chris Hicky and premiered in July 2013. The girlfriend in the video is played by American model and actress Nancy Catherine Weaver with The Block Agency in Nashville, Tennessee.

== Charts ==
=== Weekly charts ===
Chart (2013–2014)	Peak position
Canada Hot 100 (Billboard)	34
Canada Country (Billboard)	4
US Billboard Hot 100	35
US Country Airplay (Billboard)	1
US Hot Country Songs (Billboard)	2

=== Year-end charts ===
Chart (2013)	Position
US Country Airplay (Billboard)	82
US Hot Country Songs (Billboard)	66

Chart (2014)	Position
US Country Airplay (Billboard)	45
US Hot Country Songs (Billboard)	38

|}

== Certifications ==
Certifications for Whatever She's Got
Region	Certification	Certified units/sales
United States (RIAA)	3× Platinum	1,157,000
^{‡} Sales+streaming figures based on certification alone.
