= The Sound of a Million Dreams =

Studio album by David Nail
- Released: November 15, 2011
- Studio: Ben's Studio, Front Stage Studio and Back Stage Studio (Nashville, Tennessee)
- Genre: Country
- Length: 48:41
- Label: MCA Nashville
- Producer: Chuck Ainlay Frank Liddell Glenn Worf

David Nail chronology
I'm About to Come Alive (2009)	The Sound of a Million Dreams (2011)	I'm a Fire (2014)

Singles from The Sound of a Million Dreams
- 1. "Let It Rain" Released: February 7, 2011; 2. "The Sound of a Million Dreams" Released: March 5, 2012

The Sound of a Million Dreams is the second studio album by American country music artist David Nail. It was released on November 15, 2011, via MCA Nashville.

== Content ==
The album includes the number one single "Let It Rain", which features Sarah Buxton on backing vocals, and the title track, which peaked at number 38 on the country music charts.

"Grandpa's Farm" was also recorded by Frankie Ballard on his 2011 self-titled album, and "Desiree" by The Ranch, a band fronted by Keith Urban, on their 1997 self-titled debut. Dave Haywood and Charles Kelley of Lady Antebellum co-wrote the track "I Thought You Knew".

== Critical reception ==
Professional ratings
Review scores
Source	Rating
Allmusic	3.5/5 stars

Thom Jurek of Allmusic rated the album 3.5 out of 5 stars, saying that "Musically and sonically it's well above average, even if there are three generic cuts in the middle that keep it from rising to the next level."

== Track listing ==
No.	Title	Writer(s)	Length
1.	"Grandpa's Farm"	Brent Cobb, Adam Hood, Jason Saenz	4:20
2.	"Songs for Sale" (featuring Lee Ann Womack)	Scooter Carusoe, Billy Montana	3:44
3.	"Desiree"	Keith Urban, Vernon Rust	4:52
4.	"She Rides Away"	Eric Paslay, Phil Barton	4:36
5.	"Let It Rain" (featuring Sarah Buxton)	David Nail, Jonathan Singleton	4:59
6.	"I Thought You Knew"	Nail, Dave Haywood, Charles Kelley, Monty Powell	3:42
7.	"Catch You While I Can"	Carusoe, Jedd Hughes	4:23
8.	"Half Mile Hill"	Rick Brantley, Tia Sillers, Mark Selby	4:19
9.	"That's How I'll Remember You"	Brandy Clark, Shane McAnally, Madeleine Slate	4:58
10.	"The Sound of a Million Dreams"	Carusoe, Phil Vassar	3:55
11.	"Catherine" (featuring Will Hoge)	David Nail	4:53

== Personnel ==
- David Nail – lead vocals
- Chuck Leavell – acoustic piano (1–4, 6, 7, 10, 11), Wurlitzer electric piano (2, 5), Hammond B3 organ (5, 9)
- Jeff Roach – Hammond B3 organ (2, 11), keyboards (4), synthesizer piano (9), Mellotron (9), synthesizers (10)
- George Marinelli – electric guitars (1–8)
- Doug Pettibone – electric guitars
- Ilya Toshinsky – acoustic guitars (1–6, 8, 9, 11), electric guitars (5, 7, 9), bouzouki (5, 7), National guitar (10)
- Dan Dugmore – steel guitar (1–5, 8–11), electric guitars (6), acoustic guitars (7)
- Randy Leago – sitar (7)
- Glenn Worf – bass
- Fred Eltringham – drums, percussion (1)
- Chris Carmichael – strings (6)
- Joanna Cotten – backing vocals (1)
- Kim Parent – backing vocals (1)
- Lee Ann Womack – backing vocals (2)
- Sarah Buxton – backing vocals (3–5)
- Chris Rodriguez – backing vocals (3)
- Hillary Lindsey – backing vocals (6)
- Jon Randall – backing vocals (6, 7, 9)
- Daniel Tashian – backing vocals (7)
- Mike Henderson – backing vocals (8)
- Madison Cain – backing vocals (9)
- Will Hoge – backing vocals (11)

== Production ==
- Joe Fisher – A&R
- Frank Liddell – producer
- Glenn Worf – producer (1–4, 8, 11)
- Chuck Ainlay – producer, recording, mixing
- Brandon Schexnayder – additional recording, additional overdubs, additional BGV recording, recording assistant, mix assistant
- Shawn Daugherty – recording assistant
- Ryan Krieg – recording assistant
- Sorrell Lavigne – recording assistant
- Leslie Richter – recording assistant
- Justin Francis – mix assistant
- Kam Luchterhand – mix assistant
- Stewart Whitmore – digital editing
- Stephen Marcussen – mastering
- Marcussen Mastering (Hollywood, California) – editing and mastering location
- Brittany Hamlin – production coordinator
- Craig Allen – design
- David McClister – photography
- Brian Wolf for Red Stick Management – management

== Chart performance ==
The album debuted at No. 50 on the Billboard 200 (No. 44 on the Top Current Albums chart), and No. 8 on the Top Country Albums chart with 13,000 copies sold for the week.

=== Weekly charts ===
Chart (2011)	Peak position
US Billboard 200	50
US Top Country Albums (Billboard)	8

=== Year-end charts ===
Chart (2012)	Position
US Top Country Albums (Billboard)	68

=== Singles ===
Year	Single	Peak chart positions	
Year	Single	US Country	US
2011	"Let It Rain" (featuring Sarah Buxton)	1	51
2012	"The Sound of a Million Dreams"	38	—
"—" denotes releases that did not chart
