= Red Light (David Nail song) =

Single by David Nail

from the album I'm About to Come Alive
- Released: February 2, 2009
- Genre: Country
- Length: 4:06
- Label: MCA Nashville
- Songwriters: Dennis Matkosky; Melissa Peirce; Jonathan Singleton
- Producers: Frank Liddell; Mike Wrucke

David Nail singles chronology
"I'm About to Come Alive" (2008)	"Red Light" (2009)	"Turning Home" (2010)

Music video
- "Red Light" at CMT.com

"Red Light" is a song written by Jonathan Singleton, Melissa Peirce and Dennis Matkosky, and recorded by American country music artist David Nail. It was released in February 2009 as the second single from his album I'm About to Come Alive, and the third single of his career. It has become Nail's first Top 10 country hit on the U.S. Billboard Hot Country Songs chart. "Red Light" was Nail's highest-charting song on the Hot Country Songs chart for two years until "Let It Rain" went to number-one on January 21, 2012.

== Content ==
In the song, the male narrator's lover has announced her breakup from him. The narrator is expecting a different setting for his breakup, but instead is with her in the car at a "red light in the sunshine on a Sunday."

== Critical reception ==
Dan Milliken of Country Universe gave the song a C− rating, and said in his review of the song that it had an interesting story but did not expand on it: "the guy has taken this time to tell us about it because he’s flabbergasted that she would let their relationship end under such ordinary circumstances[…]It’s an OK start, and one could see how that might make for an interesting song." Chris Neal of Country Weekly described the song as "slow-rolling melancholy", calling it a "perfect introduction" to Nail's album.

== Music video ==
A music video for the song premiered on CMT on July 16, 2009. It was directed by Roman White, who also directed David Nail's previous video "I'm About to Come Alive". The video shows Nail driving through the countryside in a convertible. Flashback scenes of his girlfriend getting out of his car at a gas station and arguing with him. The video couple have clearly argued, even though the lyrics express the singer's surprise that his departed lover didn't even "try to pick a fight." He is then shown driving through the city, as well as scenes of him walking down the middle of the street. According to a 2009 interview, the girlfriend is played by his wife. The video was shot in downtown Nashville.

Matt Pfingsten directed an alternate video for the song, released one month later, which uses an acoustic version of the song.

== Chart performance ==
"Red Light" debuted at number 58 on the U.S. Billboard Hot Country Songs chart in March 2009. The song became Nail's first Top Ten hit in November 2009 and peaked at number 7 in December 2009. On the week ending October 10, 2009, the song debuted at number 95 on the U.S. Billboard Hot 100.

=== Weekly charts ===
Chart (2009–2010)	Peak position
Canada Country (Billboard)	38
US Hot Country Songs (Billboard)	7
US Billboard Hot 100	54

=== Year-end charts ===
Chart (2009)	Position
US Country Songs (Billboard)	49

== Certifications ==
Region	Certification	Certified units/sales
United States (RIAA)	Platinum	1,000,000^{‡}
^{^} Shipments figures based on certification alone.
