= I'm About to Come Alive =

Studio album by David Nail
- Released: August 18, 2009
- Recorded: 2007–2009
- Studio: Blackbird Studio, OmniSound Studios, Sound Emporium Studios, Jane's Place and Wrucke's House (Nashville, Tennessee)
- Genre: Country
- Length: 47:17
- Label: MCA Nashville
- Producer: Frank Liddell Mike Wrucke

David Nail chronology
I'm About to Come Alive (2009)	The Sound of a Million Dreams (2011)

Singles from I'm About to Come Alive
- 1. "I'm About to Come Alive" Released: April 22, 2008; 2. "Red Light" Released: February 2, 2009; 3. "Turning Home" Released: January 25, 2010

Professional ratings
Review scores
Source	Rating
AllMusic	3.5/5 stars
Country Weekly	3.5/5 stars

I'm About to Come Alive is the debut studio album by American country music singer David Nail. It was released on August 18, 2009, via MCA Nashville. The album, produced by Frank Liddell and Mike Wrucke, includes the singles "I'm About to Come Alive," "Red Light" and "Turning Home." Nail wrote or co-wrote four of the songs on the album.

== Background ==
Prior to signing with MCA Nashville in 2009, Nail recorded a self-titled album in 2002 for Mercury Nashville, which is also a division of Universal Music Group Nashville. This album, despite producing a #52-peaking country single in "Memphis," was not released due to staff changes at the label.

=== Singles ===
The lead-off single is the title track, which was originally recorded by the alternative rock band Train on its 2003 album My Private Nation. Nail's rendition peaked at number 47 on Hot Country Songs in 2008. Followup "Red Light" (which was co-written by Jonathan Singleton) was released in early 2009, and in May it became Nail's first Top 40 country hit, peaking at number 7 in December 2009. "Turning Home" was released in late January 2010 as the third single. This song was co-written by Kenny Chesney, who gave the song to Nail after deciding not to record it for himself.

Frank Liddell and Mike Wrucke, the same producers who work for Miranda Lambert, produced the album. Lambert performs background vocals on the track "Strangers on a Train." Nail wrote or co-wrote four of the album's songs.

== Critical reception ==
Chris Neal of Country Weekly magazine gave the album three-and-a-half stars out of five. He said that "Red Light" set the album's tone, which he described as "the same sort of dusky midtempo groove." The album also received a three-and-a-half star rating from Allmusic critic Thom Jurek, who said that the songs were "free of clichés" and that Nail had "so much soul in his voice that you believe every word."

== Track listing ==
No.	Title	Writer(s)	Length
1.	"Mississippi"	Scooter Carusoe, Dan Colehour, Chuck Leavell	4:36
2.	"I'm About to Come Alive"	Charlie Colin, Rob Hotchkiss, Patrick Monahan, Jimmy Stafford, Scott Underwood, Clint Bennett	4:28
3.	"Red Light"	Jonathan Singleton, Dennis Matkosky, Melissa Peirce	4:06
4.	"Again"	Carusoe, David Nail	4:21
5.	"Clouds"	Carusoe, Nail	3:53
6.	"Summer Job Days"	Gary LeVox, Neil Thrasher, Michael Dulaney	4:11
7.	"Strangers on a Train" (featuring Miranda Lambert)	Carusoe, Aimee Mayo	4:08
8.	"Looking for a Good Time"	Sean McConnell	5:12
9.	"This Time Around"	Nail, Lee Thomas Miller	3:25
10.	"Turning Home"	Carusoe, Kenny Chesney	4:59
11.	"Missouri"	Nail	4:02

== Personnel ==
- David Nail – vocals
- Chuck Leavell – acoustic piano (1, 2, 5, 7, 10), Hammond B3 organ (4, 8, 9, 11)
- Jeff Roach – keyboards (3, 6)
- Waddy Wachtel – electric guitars (1, 2, 4, 5, 7–10), acoustic guitars (11)
- Mike Wrucke – electric guitars, backing vocals (1, 3, 4, 6, 8–11), acoustic guitars (3, 7–9), steel guitar (5, 8)
- Kenny Greenberg – electric guitars (3, 6)
- Randy Scruggs – acoustic guitars (3, 6)
- Jay Joyce – electric guitars (5, 9)
- Dan Dugmore – steel guitar (1–5, 7–10), dobro (11)
- Russ Pahl – steel guitar (3)
- Glenn Worf – bass
- Nir Z – drums (1, 2, 4, 5, 8–11)
- Fred Eltringham – drums (3, 6)
- Eric Darken – percussion (4, 7–9)
- Chris Carmichael – strings (1, 11)
- Jim Hoke – harmonica (4, 7)
- Natalie Hemby – backing vocals (1, 2, 5, 10, 11)
- Miranda Lambert – backing vocals (7)
- Stoney LaRue – backing vocals (8)

== Production ==
- Joe Fisher – A&R
- Brian Wright – A&R, management
- Stephanie Wright – A&R
- Frank Liddell – producer
- Mike Wrucke – producer, recording, mixing
- Eric Tonkin – recording assistant, mix assistant (3, 6)
- Mark Pettacia – recording assistant (3, 6)
- Oran Thornton – additional recording (3, 6), mix assistant (3, 6)
- Stewart Whitmore – digital editing
- Stephen Marcussen – mastering
- Marcussen Mastering (Hollywood, California) – editing and mastering location
- Brittany Hamlin – production coordinator
- Craig Allen – design
- Andrew Southam – photography
- Clint Higham – management

== Chart performance ==
=== Album ===
Chart (2009)	Peak position
U.S. Billboard Top Country Albums	19
U.S. Billboard Top 200	71

=== End of year charts ===
Chart (2010)	Year-end 2010
US Billboard Top Country Albums	73

=== Singles ===
Year	Single	Peak chart positions	
Year	Single	US Country	US
2008	"I'm About to Come Alive"	47	—
2009	"Red Light"	7	54
2010	"Turning Home"	20	117
"—" denotes releases that did not chart
