= Night's on Fire =

Single by David Nail

from the album Fighter
- Released: July 20, 2015
- Genre: Country; country pop
- Length: 3:09
- Label: MCA Nashville
- Songwriters: Jonathan Singleton; Deric Ruttan
- Producers: Chuck Ainlay; Frank Liddell; Glenn Worf

David Nail singles chronology
| "Kiss You Tonight" (2014) | "Night's on Fire" (2015) | "Good at Tonight" (2016) |

"Night's on Fire" is a song recorded by American country music artist David Nail. It was released to radio on July 20, 2015 as the lead single to his fourth studio album Fighter. The song was written by Jonathan Singleton and Deric Ruttan.

== Critical reception ==
An uncredited Taste of Country review stated that the song "borrows from Arcade Fire for a pop-rock-infused story about two lovers enjoying the moonlight like country kids do. It hits you across the face from the very first note. Sonically, it’s a very thick track. Italian magazine "Vanity Fair.it" praised the song in its review, saying that "Night's on Fire's country atmospheres will carry the listener in the USA in the blink of an eye". The magazine also rated the song number 11 on its list of the 24 Greatest Italian Summer Hits.

== Personnel ==
- Chris McHugh - drums, percussion
- Jerry McPherson - electric guitar
- David Nail - lead vocals
- Jonathan Singleton - acoustic guitar, background vocals
- Ilya Toshinsky - banjo, acoustic guitar
- Glenn Worf - bass guitar

== Commercial performance ==
The song debuted on the Hot Country Songs chart at No. 43 on its release, and No. 40 on the Country Digital Songs chart with 6,200 copies sold. It debuted on the Country Airplay chart at No. 53 the following week. The song peaked at No. 14 on Country Airplay on chart dated July 23, 2016, and No. 17 on Hot Country Songs a week later. The song has sold 198,000 copies in the US as of August 2016. The song also charted on Billboard's 2016 Year-End Country Airplay Songs chart at No. 52.

== Music video ==
The music video was directed by Justin Key and premiered in November 2015. It consists of footage from Nail's 2016 tour.

== Chart performance ==
=== Weekly charts ===
| Chart (2015–2016) | Peak position |
|---|---|
| Canada Country (Billboard) | 32 |
| US Billboard Hot 100 | 81 |
| US Country Airplay (Billboard) | 14 |
| US Hot Country Songs (Billboard) | 17 |

=== Year end charts ===
| Chart (2016) | Position |
|---|---|
| US Country Airplay (Billboard) | 52 |
| US Hot Country Songs (Billboard) | 47 |

== Certifications ==
Certifications for Night's on Fire
| Region | Certification | Certified units/sales |
|---|---|---|
| United States (RIAA) | Platinum | 1,000,000^{‡} |
^{‡} Sales+streaming figures based on certification alone.
