= I'm Gonna Take That Mountain =

Single by Reba

from the album Room to Breathe
- Released: August 25, 2003
- Recorded: 2003
- Genre: Country
- Length: 3:25
- Label: MCA Nashville
- Songwriters: Jerry Salley, Melissa Peirce
- Producers: Buddy Cannon, Reba McEntire, Norro Wilson

Reba singles chronology
"Sweet Music Man" (2002)	"I'm Gonna Take That Mountain" (2003)	"Somebody" (2004)

"I'm Gonna Take That Mountain" is a song by American country music artist Reba McEntire. The song was released on August 25, 2003 by MCA Nashville as the lead single from her 25th studio album Room to Breathe (2003). The song was written by Jerry Salley and Melissa Peirce and produced by McEntire, Buddy Cannon, and Norro Wilson. The song is about being confident and overcoming any challenges.

The song reached number 14 on the Billboard Hot Country Songs chart. The song's co-writer, Jerry Salley, won the SESAC Songwriter Award in 2003.

== Music video ==
The video for this song was directed by Nancy Bardawil, and was filmed in a rural area of Gatlinburg, TN. The video features McEntire performing the song against a mountain backdrop, and rodeo performers showing off rope and horse tricks. She is also seen singing and dancing on a wood dance floor with a cactus prop, accompanied by four dancers.

The video debuted on Country Music Television on October 25, 2003. The music video was the third-most played video on CMT for three consecutive weeks.

== Chart performance ==
"I'm Gonna Take That Mountain" debuted on the Billboard Hot Country Songs chart (then known as "Hot Country Singles & Tracks") the week of August 30, 2003, at number 55. The song rose to its peak position of number 14 on November 1, 2003.

== Charts ==
Chart (2003)	Peak position
US Bubbling Under Hot 100 (Billboard)	3
US Hot Country Songs (Billboard)	14

== Release history ==
Release dates and format(s) for "I'm Gonna Take That Mountain"
Region	Date	Format(s)	Label(s)	Ref.
United States	August 25, 2003	Country radio	MCA Nashville	
