= Men Don't Change =

Single by Amy Dalley
- Released: February 2, 2004
- Genre: Country
- Length: 3:03
- Label: Curb
- Songwriters: Amy Dalley; Lee Thomas Miller
- Producer: Lee Thomas Miller

Amy Dalley singles chronology
"I Think You're Beautiful" (2003)	"Men Don't Change" (2004)	"I Would Cry" (2004)

"Men Don't Change" is a song recorded by American country music singer-songwriter Amy Dalley. Dalley wrote the song with Lee Thomas Miller, who also produced the track under the name Lee Miller. It was released as the third single from Dalley's unreleased debut studio album on February 2, 2004, by Curb Records.

It is her most successful single, peaking at number 23 on the US Hot Country Songs chart. In a 2009 interview, Dalley questioned why her label did not release her album following the success of the single. That same year, she would re-record the song for her officially released debut album It's Time, with the version included on that album being produced by Dalley and her husband Jack Sizemore.

== Content ==
Dalley said in the booklet of her officially released debut album It's Time (2009): "It's true. Men don't change. And I guess we don't really want them too. But girls, when he tells you who he is in those subtle (and not so subtle) ways he has...BELIEVE him! Don't try to change him. Just accept that that is who he is. Believe him. It's up to you to decide if that's what you want or not..."

== Music video ==
Michael Salomon directed the video for "Men Don't Change". It debuted on Country Music Television (CMT) on April 25, 2004.

== Commercial performance ==
"Men Don't Change" debuted on the US Hot Country Songs chart the week of February 14, 2004, at number 51, becoming the second highest debut of the week. It was Dalley's third entry on the chart following "Love's Got an Attitude (It Is What It Is)" and "I Think You're Beautiful". It reached the top-forty the week of March 20, her second following "Love's Got an Attitude". It reached a peak position of number 23 on the chart the week of August 14, 2004. The song spent 27 weeks in total on the chart.

== Charts ==
=== Weekly charts ===
Weekly chart performance for "Men Don't Change"
Chart (2004)	Peak position
US Hot Country Songs (Billboard)	23

=== Year-end charts ===
Year-end chart performance for "Men Don't Change"
Chart (2004)	Position
US Hot Country Singles & Tracks (Billboard)	75
