= Holly Gleason =

American music critic and consultant

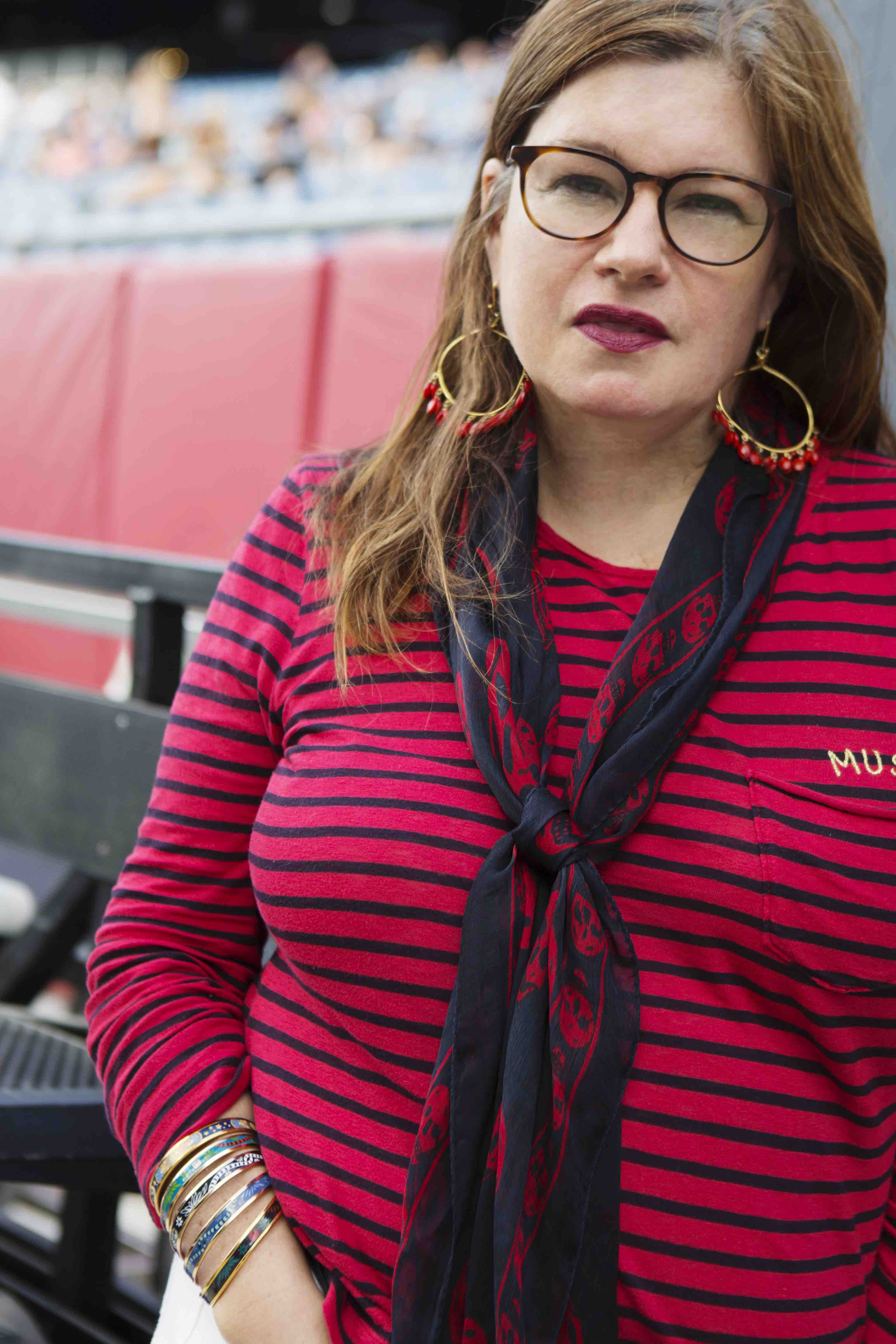
- Photo by Allistar Ann
- Born: December 31; Shaker Heights, Ohio, U.S.
- Education: University of Miami; Spalding University
- Occupations: Music journalist, songwriter, music industry consultant
- Writing career
- Period: 1991- present
- Website: hollygleason.com

Holly Gleason (December 31) is an American music critic, songwriter, and music industry consultant. Focused primarily on country and roots music, she has written for Rolling Stone, the New York Times, and Spin, among others. As a publicist, Gleason has worked with artists including Kenny Chesney, Brooks & Dunn, Emmylou Harris, John Prine, and Rodney Crowell. Under the name Lady Goodman, she co-wrote "Better as a Memory," a #1 hit on the Billboard Hot Country charts for Chesney in 2008.

== Early life and education ==
Gleason grew up in Shaker Heights, Ohio. She earned a BA in communications from the University of Miami and an MFA in writing from Spalding University. In 2016, she received the Distinguished Alumnae Award from Laurel in recognition of her career in the music business,

== Career ==
=== Music critic, publicist ===
While still in college, Gleason began her career as a music critic for the Miami Herald. From 1990 through 1993, she worked as a publicist for Sony Music Nashville, and subsequently founded Joe's Garage, a Nashville-based public relations and artist development agency. While the company was active (1993–2008), she additionally served as the features editor for Hits (1998–2000), and founded a blog, The Yummy List.

Gleason has freelanced as a music critic and journalist since 1993. She was nominated for Best Cultural Reporting for her 2015 essay, “The Impossible Lightness of Being Taylor Swift,” by the International Network of Street Papers. In 2016, she was awarded a fellowship by the Rock and Roll Hall of Fame’s CWRU Center for Pop Music Studies.

Gleason edited Woman Walk the Line: How the Women in Country Music Changed Our Lives, a collection of essays by female music writers on the artists that inspired them. It was published in September 2017 by the University of Texas Press as part of their American Music Series. The book received the 2018 Belmont Book Award, presented for the best book on country music that year at the International Country Music Conference, considered to be "the foremost academic gathering devoted to country, roots and bluegrass music in the nation." Gleason made appearances for the book at the Southern Festival of Books, Miami Book Fair, South by Southwest, Country Music Hall of Fame and Rock & Roll Hall of Fame.

=== Lady Goodman ===
Gleason writes songs under the pen name Lady Goodman, a character in the film Almost Famous. She has collaborated with Guy Clark, Rodney Crowell, Bill Deasy, Matchbox 20's Kyle Cook, Restless Heart's Larry Stewart, Marc Lee Shannon and Andrea Zonn. After working as Chesney's publicist, she co-wrote "Better as a Memory" with Travis Hill (credited as Scooter Carusoe). Chesney recorded the song unaware that Gleason had written it, and included it on his 2007 album Just Who I Am: Poets and Pirates.

=== Y'ALL EAT YET? Welcome to the Pretty B*tchin' Kitchen ===
Having interviewed Miranda Lambert extensively, when the Texas songwriter signed a book deal with HarperCollins to create a lifestyle/entertaining book. she enlisted Gleason as collaborator. It debuted at #3 on The New York Times Bestseller List, and appeared on Amazon's Country, Celebrity Cookbooks. It was #2 on Amazon's overall best sellers list upon release.

A hybrid take on music, memoir, cooking, and female friends, Y'ALL EAT YET? was nominated for Best Book, Non-Fiction at the National Arts & Entertainment Journalism Awards. It also received an ANDY Nomination for Best Memoir and Narrative Nonfiction at the 2024 Gathering of the Ghosts.

== Additional awards ==
In 2018, Brenda Lee and Jeannie Seely inducted Gleason into the SOURCE Hall of Fame. Created in 1991, it's the longest running organization dedicated to recognizing women in the music industry. Held at the Musicians Hall of Fame and Museum at Nashville's Municipal Auditorium, the class included mentors Ronna Rubin, Cathy Gurley, JoAnne Berry, along with Anita Hogan, Tammy Genovese, and Barbara Baker.

In 2019, Miranda Lambert presented Gleason the Country Music Association's Media Achievement Award, recognizing impact beyond the mere execution of covering the genre. Among the stories Gleason, who's written extensively about women in country, was recognized for was her cover package for POLLSTAR that included the cover profile of Underwood, Miranda Lambert's All-Female our and an overview of A Woman's Place is on the Road.

In 2023, Gleason won Entertainment Journalist of the Year by the Los Angeles Press Club at the Southern California Media Awards. The committee wrote of their decision: “With her experience in writing about the music industry, particularly country music, Gleason combines that vast knowledge with incisive interview questions and revealing profiles of musicians." She also won the top award for music criticism for her essay on why Dolly Parton belongs in the Rock and Roll Hall of Fame.
