= Turning Home =

Single by David Nail

from the album I'm About to Come Alive
- Released: January 25, 2010
- Recorded: 2009
- Genre: Country
- Length: 4:15 (radio edit); 4:59 (album version)
- Label: MCA Nashville
- Songwriters: Kenny Chesney; Scooter Carusoe
- Producers: Frank Liddell; Mike Wrucke

David Nail singles chronology
"Red Light" (2009)	"Turning Home" (2010)	"Let It Rain" (2011)

"Turning Home" is a song written by Kenny Chesney and Scooter Carusoe, and recorded by American country music singer David Nail. It was released in January 2010 as the third single from Nail's debut album I'm About to Come Alive, as well as his fourth single release overall.

The song was nominated in the Best Male Country Vocal Performance category at the 53rd Grammy Awards, however, it lost to "'Til Summer Comes Around" by Keith Urban.

== Production and writing ==
The song was written by Kenny Chesney and Scooter Carusoe, who wrote Chesney's singles "Anything but Mine" and "Better as a Memory." Chesney had originally planned to record it himself.

In "Turning Home," the narrator recalls events from his high school days, referring to that time of his life as his "glory days." It includes a prominent piano section, because Nail wanted a strong piano player for the album. Nail told The Tennessean that he identified with the song's theme: "I just knew that this was that song that I had been searching for[…]Being from a small town in southeast Missouri, all the imagery in the song was something that I could really relate to."

== Critical reception ==
Bobby Peacock of Roughstock gave a mostly favorable review, considering the song "a bit overproduced" but saying that Nail "delivers the song powerfully." Juli Thanki of Engine 145 gave the song a thumbs-down, saying that she considered the song's production "overblown" in its latter half. She thought that it was one of the weakest-written tracks on the album, but praised Nail's "strong, pleasant voice."

== Music video ==
The video was directed by Stephen Shepherd and premiered on CMT on March 12, 2010. It was shot in black-and-white and on location in his hometown of Kennett, Missouri. It shows Nail giving an impromptu performance in two costumes. He first sings with a hat, wristwatch, and short-sleeved shirt, making him completely unrecognizable. The second & third verses and choruses feature him singing in a black shirt, no hat, and bracelet. Scenes also feature him singing on the bleachers of his high school football field. During the performance, his band also appears.

== Chart performance ==
"Turning Home" debuted at number 49 on the Billboard Hot Country Songs charts dated for the week ending February 13, 2010. The song entered that chart's Top 40 at number 39 on the chart dated for March 6, 2010, becoming Nail's second Top 40 hit on that chart. In August, it peaked at number 20 on the country chart.

Chart (2010)	Peak position
US Hot Country Songs (Billboard)	20
US Billboard Bubbling Under Hot 100	17
