= My Sister (Reba McEntire song) =

Single by Reba

from the album Room to Breathe
- Released: March 14, 2005
- Recorded: 2003
- Genre: Country
- Length: 3:59
- Label: MCA Nashville
- Songwriters: Amy Dalley, Bonnie Baker, Roxie Dean
- Producers: Buddy Cannon, Reba McEntire, Norro Wilson

Reba singles chronology
"He Gets That from Me" (2004)	"My Sister" (2005)	"You're Gonna Be (Always Loved by Me)" (2005)

"My Sister" is a song written by Amy Dalley, Bonnie Baker and Roxie Dean, and recorded by American country music artist Reba McEntire. It was released in March 2005 as the fourth single from the album Room to Breathe. The song reached #16 on the Billboard Hot Country Singles & Tracks chart.

== Chart performance ==
Chart (2005)	Peak position
US Hot Country Songs (Billboard)	16
US Billboard Hot 100	93

== Release history ==
Release dates and format(s) for "My Sister"
Region	Date	Format(s)	Label(s)	Ref.
United States	March 14, 2005	Country radio	MCA Nashville	
