= Crazy (2007 film) =

Film by Rick Bieber

- Film poster
- Directed by: Rick Bieber
- Written by: Rick Bieber; Jason Ehlers; Brent Boyd
- Produced by: Rick Bieber
- Starring: Waylon Payne; Ali Larter; Lane Garrison; Scott Michael Campbell; David Conrad
- Cinematography: Craig Haagensen
- Edited by: Tom Rolf
- Music by: Larry Klein
- Distributed by: FN Crazy Film LLC
- Release date: December 10, 2007
- Running time: 106 minutes
- Country: United States
- Language: English

Crazy is a 2007 American biographical musical drama film co-written and directed by Rick Bieber, starring Waylon Payne and Ali Larter.

Inspired by the life of Nashville guitarist Hank Garland, the film was shot from January 13 to February 12, 2005, in Los Angeles.

== Plot ==
Crazy is the story of a legendary guitar player who emerged from Nashville in the 1950s. Blessed with incomparable natural talent, Hank Garland quickly established his reputation as the finest sessions player in Nashville. Artists such as Roy Orbison, Patsy Cline, The Everly Brothers, and Elvis Presley all sought Hank’s brilliant playing for their recordings. Moving effortlessly from country to rockabilly to jazz, Hank was also quickly recognized by the likes of Dave Brubeck, Gary Burton, Joe Morello, and Joe Benjamin.

The Nashville scene was a unique place in the 1950s – dominated by a small group of executives and musicians who controlled the studios, labels and unions. Hank, in his arrogance and pursuit of musical excellence, often came into conflict with the business, social and racial culture he found both restrictive and frequently frustrating.

Some people say that a near-fatal car accident, which Hank suffered, was a result of tragic response to dreams unfulfilled. Others will say that the subsequent electro-shock therapy, which was ordered by his doctors, may have contributed to ending Hank’s playing career at the age of thirty-one. Four years later his wife dies in her own car accident.

Historians have questioned the accuracy of some of the movie's points, noting that Garland was a member of Nashville's fabled "A-Team" of session players, with whom he socialized in the 1950s, and who rallied around him in the wake of his accident.

== Cast ==
- Waylon Payne as Hank Garland
- Ali Larter as Evelyn Garland, Hank's wife
- Lane Garrison as Billy Garland, Hank's brother
- Scott Michael Campbell as Billy Byrd
- John Fleck as Lloyd Copas
- Timothy Omundson as Paul Howard
- David Conrad as Ryan Bradford
- Silas Weir Mitchell as Neal, studio manager
- Eden Rountree as Thelma
- Raymond O'Connor as Jimmy
- Beau Baxter as Jerry, record producer
- Brent Briscoe as Doug Johnson, head musician's union
- Ryan Cross as Joe Benjamin, bass player

== Awards ==
Crazy won the Best of Fest award at the Real to Reel International Film Festival in 2008.
