= The Sound of a Million Dreams (song) =

Single by David Nail

from the album The Sound of a Million Dreams
- Released: March 24, 2012
- Genre: Country
- Length: 3:55
- Label: MCA Nashville
- Songwriters: Phil Vassar, Scooter Carusoe
- Producers: Chuck Ainlay, Frank Liddell

David Nail singles chronology
"Let It Rain" (2011)	"The Sound of a Million Dreams" (2012)	"Someone Like You" (2012)

"The Sound of a Million Dreams" is a song recorded by American country music artist David Nail. It was released in March 2012 as the second single and title track from the album The Sound of a Million Dreams. The song reached #38 on the Billboard Hot Country Songs chart. The song was written by Phil Vassar and Scooter Carusoe.

== Content ==
The song is a nostalgic look at music by which the narrator was inspired. It contains lyrical references to "Mainstreet" by Bob Seger, "Born to Run" by Bruce Springsteen, and "Mama Tried" by Merle Haggard. It is a piano ballad in the key of E major with a slow tempo of 60 beats per minute in 4/4 time signature. The song features a primary chord pattern of A^{2}-B^{7}-C♯m three times, followed by A-B^{sus}-E-A/E-E.

According to co-writer Phil Vassar, the idea came during a writing session with Scooter Carusoe when the latter presented the phrase "the sound of a million dreams". This phrase inspired the two to begin talking about songs that had been inspirational to them. Vassar complimented Nail's recording of the song, saying that "it's so simple, they didn't overproduce it. It's just him singing a song."

== Chart performance ==
Chart (2012)	Peak position
US Hot Country Songs (Billboard)	38
