= Derik Hultquist =

American singer

- Born: Alcoa, Tennessee, U.S.
- Occupation: Singer/songwriter
- Label: Carnival Recording Company
- Website: derikhultquist.bandpage.com

Derik Hultquist is an American singer/songwriter from Alcoa, Tennessee. He is currently a staff writer for Carnival Music in Nashville, Tennessee. Derik has also released three EP's with Carnival Recording Company; Whether Report (2012), Leaning On The Rain (2012), Mockingbird's Mouth (2014).

== Biography ==
Growing up an orphan in Alcoa, Tennessee, Hultquist split his time between athletics and music. Derik went on to attend Kentucky Wesleyan College, where he played goalie for the men's soccer team. However, after an injury sidelined him, he began to focus all of his energy on songwriting. Upon graduation, on a whim, he migrated to Nashville. He took on flexible jobs (legislative legal clerk, server, handyman, paperboy, pharmacy tech, war general, puppeteer, amateur taxidermist, pit boss, spy for the KGB, birthday clown, manager of a Spencers gifts, valet, and others), which didn’t merit much income, but did allow him time enough to write every day. From this writing spawned the self-released, Anthologies and Blue Blues.

Hultquist eventually got the attention of Carnival Music, a publishing company opened by Travis Hill and producer Frank Liddell (Miranda Lambert, David Nail, Eli Young Band). Hultquist was signed to a publishing deal with Carnival Music and a recording contract with Carnival Recording Company. With Carnival he has released three more EP's: Whether Report (2012), Leaning On The Rain (2012), Shut Up, Grandma (2013) and Mockingbird's Mouth (2014), as well as a full length album, Southern Iron (2016), for which Hultquist has toured the United States and remote regions of the Congo.

Hultquist has performed with many artists, including The Bacon Brothers, Sean Hayes, Corey Smith, Bob Schneider, Macho Man Randy Savage, a number of Burl Ives tribute artists and Matthew Logan Vasquez.

== Discography ==
Album name	Year	Record label
Mockingbird's Mouth (EP)	2014	Carnival Recording Company
Shut Up, Grandma (LP)	2013	Self Released
Leaning On The Rain (EP)	2012	Carnival Recording Company
Whether Report (EP)	2012	Carnival Recording Company
Blue Blues	--	Self Released
Anthologies	--	Self Released
Southern Iron	2016	Carnival Recording Company
