= He Gets That from Me =

Single by Reba

from the album Room to Breathe
- Released: August 15, 2004
- Recorded: 2003
- Genre: Country
- Length: 3:38
- Label: MCA Nashville
- Songwriters: Steven Dale Jones; Phillip White
- Producers: Reba McEntire; Buddy Cannon; Norro Wilson

Reba singles chronology
"Somebody" (2004)	"He Gets That from Me" (2004)	"My Sister" (2005)

"He Gets That from Me" is a song recorded by American country music artist Reba McEntire. The song was written by Phillip White and Steven Dale Jones, and produced by McEntire, Buddy Cannon, and Norro Wilson. It was released on August 15, 2004 as the third single from her 25th studio album Room to Breathe (2003).

The song became a decent commercial success, peaking at number seven on the Billboard Hot Country Songs and number 59 on the Billboard Hot 100.

== Content ==
In "He Gets That from Me", the narrator is a mother describing things that her son "gets from her", such as waking up with an attitude and having freckles. Later, it describes things the son gets from his father, like playing guitar and cracking jokes. It is later revealed in the final verse that the son's father has died, with the son praying to the Lord for him and his mother to make it through and to make sure to tell his father they are okay.

== Chart performance ==
"He Gets That from Me" debuted on the Billboard Hot Country Songs (then titled "Hot Country Singles & Tracks") the week of September 4, 2004, at number 50, the third-highest debut of the week. The song entered the top-40 the next week at number 39. On January 29, 2005, "He Gets That from Me" rose to number ten on the Hot Country Songs chart, becoming her 54th top ten hit. It also marked 25 years since her first country top ten hit, 1981's "(You Lift Me) Up to Heaven", which peaked at number eight. The song gave McEntire the record for the longest span of top ten hits. "He Gets That from Me" would later rise to a peak position of number seven the week of February 19, 2005; the song would go on to spend 30 weeks on the chart, tying with her 2010 single "Turn On the Radio" for being her second longest run on the country chart.

== Charts ==
=== Weekly charts ===
Weekly chart performance for "He Gets That from Me"
Chart (2004–2005)	Peak position
Canada Country (Radio & Records)	12
US Billboard Hot 100	59
US Hot Country Songs (Billboard)	7

=== Year-end charts ===
Year-end chart performance for "He Gets That from Me"
Chart (2005)	Position
US Country Songs (Billboard)	49
