= Waylon Payne =

American singer-songwriter

Waylon Malloy Payne (born April 5, 1972) is an American country singer, songwriter, musician and actor. He is the son of the country singer Sammi Smith and guitarist Jody Payne.

== Early life ==
Payne was born in Nashville, Tennessee, the son of guitarist Jody Payne and Grammy Award-winning country singer Sammi Smith. His father became a longtime picker for Willie Nelson; his mother toured with Waylon Jennings. Payne is named after Jennings, who is his godfather. Due to the divorce of his parents and their heavy touring schedules, when he was about four months old Payne's mother placed him with her brother and sister-in-law, Bob and Yvonne, in Vidor, Texas. Although he spent summers out on the road with his mother, he lived with his uncle and aunt, who were strict Christians, until he was 18. Payne, who is gay, revealed in an interview with CBS This Morning that his uncle had sexually abused him and that he disclosed the abuse when he came out as gay. His extended family did not believe him and they ostracized and disowned him entirely.

After high school, Payne enrolled in a seminary to become a minister. Payne had also acquired a taste for beer, marijuana, and popular music, which made his downfall complete in the eyes of his aunt and uncle. "I haven't seen them since," he has said. "I was branded a sinner and basically disowned."

== Music ==
Payne's music industry career began to take shape in the clubs of Los Angeles. He was part of the popular Eastbound and Down country night at the King King Club in Hollywood, which featured musicians playing pure, uncompromising roots music and appealed to such artists as Lucinda Williams and Dwight Yoakam. Prohibited was the playing of anything but traditional classics by Hank Williams, George Jones and other performers of true country.

While in L.A., Payne wrote and recorded some songs with the help of his group of musical friends, which included producer Keith Gattis. With the record completed, but no deal to market it, Payne was playing New York with Willie Nelson and Pat Green when Green suggested he play the album for his label, Republic/Universal. Payne was signed with the label and his début album, "The Drifter," was released June 22, 2004.

Payne is signed with Carnival Music and since returning to Nashville has had two cuts with Miranda Lambert and has been back writing with Lee Ann Womack which resulted in multiple writing credits on her new album. Womack has previously received a Grammy nomination for Payne's "Solitary Thinkin" in 2010 for Best Female Country Vocal Performance.

Since 2010 Waylon has received album credits for Cory Morrow's Brand New Me, Charlie Robison's Live at Billy Bob's Texas and Deep in the Heart: Big Songs for Little Texans Everywhere, Lee Ann Womack's Hollywood and The Lonely, the Lonesome & the Gone, Ashley Monroe's Sparrow, Wade Bowen's Solid Ground, and Aaron Lewis's State I'm In.

== Acting ==
Payne was featured in the role of fellow country music artist Jerry Lee Lewis in the hit 20th Century Fox movie Walk the Line (2005), which stars Joaquin Phoenix as Johnny Cash and Reese Witherspoon as June Carter, and did all his own singing. Payne's feature on the soundtrack album allowed him to share the Grammy Award won. Payne then starred as Hank Garland in an independent feature about the legendary guitarist's life titled Crazy (2007).

Waylon Payne has also made guest appearances on television, including the series CSI: Crime Scene Investigation.

Waylon Payne also stars in Monte Hellman's thriller Road to Nowhere.

Waylon Payne was also featured in the role as Tony Nash in the 2014 film The Identical.

== Discography ==
- The Drifter (2004)
- Blue Eyes, The Harlot, The Queer, The Pusher & Me (2020)
- Wayward (2026)
