= I'm About to Come Alive (song) =

Single by David Nail

from the album I'm About to Come Alive
- Released: April 22, 2008
- Genre: Country
- Length: 4:28
- Label: MCA Nashville
- Songwriters: Charlie Colin; Rob Hotchkiss; Patrick Monahan; Jimmy Stafford; Scott Underwood; Clint Bennett
- Producers: Frank Liddell; Mike Wrucke

David Nail singles chronology
"Memphis" (2002)	"I'm About to Come Alive" (2008)	"Red Light" (2009)

"I'm About to Come Alive" is a song written by Charlie Colin, Rob Hotchkiss, Patrick Monahan, Jimmy Stafford, Scott Underwood and Clint Bennett, and originally recorded by American rock band Train for their 2003 album My Private Nation. It was later covered by American country music artist David Nail and was released in April 2008 as the first single from his album of the same name, and the second single of his career.

== Music video ==
A music video for the song premiered on CMT in 2008. It was directed by Roman White. Filmed in Chicago, it starts off in black-and-white (gradually changing to color throughout the clip) with Nail's girlfriend leaving him alone in a cold loft, and Nail walking through the cold, snowy scenery trying to find her. She is also seen walking alone in the snow, possibly feeling contempt that she left him. Flashbacks of the couple in happier times are also shown. Nail is seen performing the song while standing in the loft and walking in the bitter cold, air clearly visible coming out his mouth as he sings. The two eventually meet up in Millennium Park, and reconcile.

== Chart performance ==
Chart (2008)	Peak position
US Hot Country Songs (Billboard)	47
