= Adam Hood =

American singer-songwriter

Adam Hood is a singer-songwriter from Opelika, Alabama.

== Career ==
Hood's 2007 album Different Groove was produced with Pete Anderson. In 2007, Hood opened for Taylor Hicks, performed at Diversafest in Tulsa and at the Austin City Limits Music Festival, and was seen in a segment of We're An American Band on the Documentary Channel. Hood's music video for "Hell of a Fight" ranked No. 5 on the CMT front page main category "Todays Top Videos" on February 18, 2012. Hood has toured with artists such as Pat Green, Todd Snider, Miranda Lambert, Leon Russell and Ian Moore.

He was on the Willie Nelson Throwdown Tour for the summer of 2011 as part of the Bluebird Cafe singer-songwriter group.

Hood was signed with Carnival Records and was a songwriter for Carnival Music Publishing for 6 years.

In January 2015, Rolling Stone mentioned Hood as a top 10 country artists listeners should know.

Hood is in a co-publishing deal with Low Country Sound & Warner/Chappell Music.

== Discography ==
- 21 to Enter (2002), Adam Hood Music
- 6th Street (EP) (2004)
- Different Groove (2007), Little Dog Records
- Different Groove (2009), with 3 bonus tracks, Saguaro Road Records
- Adam Hood (EP) (2011)
- The Shape of Things (2011), Carnival Records
- Welcome to the Big World (2014), Adam Hood Music
- Somewhere in Between (2018), Adam Hood Music
- Bad Days Better (2022), Southern Songs

=== Music videos ===
Year	Video	Director
2007	"22 Days too Long"	Brennan Reed
2008	"Different Groove"	Pete Anderson
2012	"Hell of a Fight"	Andi Zack
2015	"Way Too Long"	Josh Newcom
2015	"Bar Band"	Josh Newcom
2018	"She Don't Love Me"	
2018	"Downturn"	Steven Wesley Miller
