= Kiss You Tonight =

Single by David Nail

from the album I'm a Fire
- Released: March 3, 2014
- Genre: Country
- Length: 3:51
- Label: MCA Nashville
- Songwriters: David Cook; Jay Knowles; Trent Summar
- Producers: Frank Liddell; Chuck Ainlay; Glenn Worf

David Nail singles chronology
"Whatever She's Got" (2013)	"Kiss You Tonight" (2014)	"Night's on Fire" (2015)

"Kiss You Tonight" is a song recorded by American country music artist David Nail. It was released as the second single from Nail's third studio album I'm a Fire. The song was written by David Cook, Jay Knowles, and Trent Summar, and was released on March 3, 2014 in advance of the album release.

== Background ==
The song was written by David Cook together with Jay Knowles and Trent Summar. It was the third song Cook wrote after he moved to Nashville in 2012. Although Cook went into the writing session intending to write for himself, he felt the song didn't fit him. Trent Summar sang in the demo, and Ron Stuve pitched the song to Joe Fisher at UMG who put it on hold for David Nail.

According to Nail, "Kiss You Tonight" had the impact on him similar to what "Need You Now" by Lady Antebellum had. He said that it "was a song that the first time I heard it I knew I was going to record it. There was just something about it that made me remember so many songs from the past that, you know there’s not a specific thing that jumps out at you the first time you hear it you just know, 'Hey, I wanna hear that again.'"

The song is a track from the album I'm a Fire produced by Frank Liddell, Chuck Ainlay and Glenn Worf. On February 18, 2014, Nail announced that the song would be his second single from the album. It was released to radio with an add date of March 3, 2014.

== Critical reception ==
The song was largely well received by the critics. Matt Bjorke of Roughstock rated the song four stars out of five and described it as "a song that’s both contemporary and traditional sounding in melody", and has a "relatable "I messed up" message" about someone "wanting redemption with the lost girl of his dreams." He also called David Nail's vocal delivery on the song "stellar", while Markos Papadatos of Digital Journal described his vocal as "infectious" and "captivating". Billy Dukes of Taste of Country considered the song to be "a rare song that’s easily accessible, yet still has great emotional depth". He also said that the song "should become Nail’s biggest hit to date." Think Country however demurred, and thought the song may struggle on the chart as "it is less distinctive than "Whatever She's Got"", the reviewer also added that the song is "not mind-blowing, but it's heartfelt".

== Music video ==
The music video was directed by Chris Hicky and released via Esquire on May 15, 2014. The video was shot in Las Vegas.

== Chart performance ==
"Kiss You Tonight" debuted at No. 54 on the U.S. Billboard Country Airplay for the chart dated March 29, 2014. It peaked at No. 17 on the Country Airplay chart dated January 3, 2015, its 41st week on that chart. It entered at No. 45 on the U.S. Billboard Hot Country Songs chart for the week of April 26, 2014, and peaked at No. 25 for the chart dated October 25, 2014. As of December 2014, the song has sold 178,900 copies in the United States.

Chart (2014–2015)	Peak position
US Bubbling Under Hot 100 (Billboard)	3
US Country Airplay (Billboard)	17
US Hot Country Songs (Billboard)	25

=== Year-end charts ===
Chart (2014)	Position
US Country Airplay (Billboard)	71
US Hot Country Songs (Billboard)	77

Chart (2015)	Position
US Country Airplay (Billboard)	83
US Hot Country Songs (Billboard)	100

== Certifications ==
Certifications for Kiss You Tonight
Region	Certification	Certified units/sales
United States (RIAA)	Gold	500,000^{‡}
^{‡} Sales+streaming figures based on certification alone.
