= Better as a Memory =

Single by Kenny Chesney

from the album Just Who I Am: Poets & Pirates
- Released: March 31, 2008
- Recorded: 2007
- Genre: Country
- Length: 4:12
- Label: BNA
- Songwriters: Scooter Carusoe; Lady Goodman
- Producers: Buddy Cannon; Kenny Chesney

Kenny Chesney singles chronology
"Every Other Weekend" (2008)	"Better as a Memory" (2008)	"Everybody Wants to Go to Heaven" (2008)

"Better as a Memory" is a song written by Scooter Carusoe and Holly Gleason using the pseudonym Lady Goodman and recorded by American country music artist Kenny Chesney. It was released in March 2008 as the fourth and final single from Chesney's 2007 album Just Who I Am: Poets & Pirates. With a two-week stay, it became Chesney's fourteenth number one hit on the US Billboard Hot Country Songs chart for the week of June 28, 2008.

== Content ==
The song is a ballad in which the narrator addresses a lover with whom he is splitting with, but most likely warning her he is not the kind to get deeply involved with. He then lists a series of similes regarding himself (such as "built to fade like your favorite song", and "always sure until I doubt"), ultimately telling her that he is "better as a memory / than as [her] man".

The co-writers of the song are both pseudonymous: Scooter Carusoe is a pseudonym for Travis Hill, founder of Carnival Music, and Lady Goodman is a pseudonym of Holly Gleason, Chesney's publicist and a music critic.

== Critical reception ==
Noted Nashville critic Robert K Oermann of Music Row Magazine wrote that "['Better as a Memory'] could be the performance of [Chesney's] life, [and] perhaps his career."

Leeann Ward of Country Universe gave the song a B− grade. She stated that the lyrics seem to be somewhat "self-indulgent" but then said that "the production is nice and Kenny’s vocals are spot on."

== Notable Performances ==
The song was performed with a string quartet on the 2009 Grammy Awards, where Chesney was introduced by Morgan Freeman. Later, it became the final performance in his Sony/Hot Ticket theatrical film "Kenny Chesney: Summer in 3-D."

== Popular culture ==
The tune was voted one of NSAI’s “Ten Songs I Wish I’d Written” in November 2008.

== Chart performance ==
Chart (2008)	Peak position
US Hot Country Songs (Billboard)	1
US Billboard Hot 100	46
US Billboard Pop 100	100
Canada Country (Billboard)	2
Canada Hot 100 (Billboard)	61

=== Year-end charts ===
Chart (2008)	Position
US Country Songs (Billboard)	23
Canada Country (Billboard)	15

== Certifications ==
Certifications for Better as a Memory
Region	Certification	Certified units/sales
United States (RIAA)	Gold	500,000^{‡}
^{‡} Sales+streaming figures based on certification alone.
