= I'm a Fire (album) =

Studio album by David Nail
- Released: March 4, 2014
- Recorded: 2013
- Studios: Ronnie's Place Studio, Sound Stage Studios, Jane's Place, Starstruck Studios, Ben's Studio, House of Blues, Noisy Neighbors and Jaren Johnston Studio (Nashville, Tennessee)
- Genre: Country
- Length: 40:56
- Label: MCA Nashville
- Producers: Chuck Ainlay Frank Liddell Glenn Worf

David Nail chronology
The Sound of a Million Dreams (2011)	I'm a Fire (2014)	Fighter (2016)

Singles from I'm a Fire
- 1. "Whatever She's Got" Released: May 28, 2013; 2. "Kiss You Tonight" Released: March 3, 2014

I'm a Fire is the third studio album by American country music artist David Nail. It was released on March 4, 2014 via MCA Nashville. The album garnered a positive reception from critics praising the production and lyrical content synchronizing with Nail's vocal delivery. I'm a Fire debuted at numbers 3 and 13 on both the Top Country Albums and Billboard 200 charts respectively and spawned two singles: "Whatever She's Got" and "Kiss You Tonight".

== Content ==
Nail co-wrote four of the album's eleven tracks. The album's final track is a cover of Glen Campbell's "Galveston," which Nail performs as a duet with Lee Ann Womack, "When They're Gone (Lyle County)" features harmony vocals from Little Big Town and "Brand New Day" features harmony vocals from Aubrie Sellers, Womack and Jason Sellers' daughter.

"Whatever She's Got" was released as the album's lead-off single on May 28, 2013. It became Nail's second number one single on the Billboard Country Airplay chart in February 2014, as well as his first Top 40 hit on the Billboard Hot 100. In addition, it has received a Platinum certification in the U.S. "Kiss You Tonight" was released as the second single from the album on March 3, 2014.

== Critical reception ==
Professional ratings
Review scores
Source	Rating
AllMusic	3/5 stars
Country Weekly	A−
Roughstock	4.5/5 stars
Taste of Country	Positive

I'm a Fire received mostly positive reviews from music critics. At AllMusic, Stephen Thomas Erlewine rated the album three out of five stars, saying that "I'm a Fire [is] insinuating, not insistent. It may not deliver a knockout punch but it's not intended to be powerful; it's a grower, sounding better with repeated exposure, repeated listens revealing the craft in the songs and the subtlety in Nail's execution." Jon Freeman of Country Weekly graded the album an A−, writing that "Golden-voiced David Nail is one of those rare singers who sounds comfortable singing just about anything, so it’s to his credit that he deals in more hefty material on his third album, I’m a Fire." At Roughstock, Matt Bjorke rated the album four-and-a-half stars out of five, favorably describing the "more ‘upbeat’ and less ‘downtempo’" nature of the record. He praised album track "The Secret" as one of Nail's best songs. Taste of Country highlighted the album as a Critic's Pick and Billy Dukes complimented the lyricism, production, and Nail's ability to do heavy heartache. He listed "Burnin' Bed," "Brand New Day," and "The Secret" as the standout tracks.

== Commercial performance ==
The album debuted at number 3 on the Top Country Albums chart and number 13 on the Billboard 200, with 23,000 copies sold in the United States, making it Nail's highest-charting album on both charts. As of June 2016, the album has sold 91,000 copies in the US.

== Track listing ==
No.	Title	Writer(s)	Length
1.	"Whatever She's Got"	Jimmy Robbins, Jon Nite	3:55
2.	"Broke My Heart"	Scooter Carusoe, David Nail, Jonathan Singleton	3:16
3.	"Burnin' Bed"	Brandy Clark, Bob DiPiero, Shane McAnally	3:38
4.	"When They're Gone (Lyle County)" (featuring Little Big Town)	Carusoe, Brett Eldredge	3:42
5.	"Brand New Day"	Carusoe, McAnally, Nail	4:44
6.	"Kiss You Tonight"	David Cook, Jay Knowles, Trent Summar	3:51
7.	"The Secret"	Carusoe, Nail	4:21
8.	"Countin' Cars"	Michael Dulaney, Lee Thomas Miller, Neil Thrasher	2:52
9.	"Easy Love"	Miller, Nail	3:21
10.	"I'm a Fire"	Tom Douglas, Jaren Johnston	4:05
11.	"Galveston" (duet with Lee Ann Womack)	Jimmy Webb	3:11

== Personnel ==
- Sarah Buxton – background vocals
- Matt Chamberlain – drums, percussion
- Eric Darken – percussion
- Jerry Douglas – dobro
- Karen Fairchild – background vocals on "When They're Gone (Lyle County)"
- Paul Franklin – steel guitar
- Jaren Johnston – background vocals
- Chris McHugh – drums, percussion
- Jerry McPherson – acoustic guitar, baritone guitar, electric guitar
- George Marinelli Jr. – electric slide guitar, acoustic guitar, electric guitar
- Gene Miller – background vocals
- David Nail – lead vocals
- Jeff Roach – keyboards
- Chris Rodriguez – background vocals
- Mike Rojas – Hammond B-3 organ, piano
- Kimberly Schlapman – background vocals on "When They're Gone (Lyle County)"
- Aubrie Sellers – background vocals on "Brand New Day"
- Jonathan Singleton – background vocals
- Phillip Sweet – background vocals on "When They're Gone (Lyle County)"
- Neil Thrasher – background vocals
- Ilya Toshinsky – banjo, bouzouki, acoustic guitar, electric guitar, mandolin
- Jimi Westbrook – background vocals on "When They're Gone (Lyle County)"
- Micah Wilshire – background vocals
- Lee Ann Womack – background vocals on "Galveston"
- Glenn Worf – bass guitar

== Charts ==
=== Weekly charts ===
Chart (2014)	Peak position
US Billboard 200	13
US Top Country Albums (Billboard)	3

=== Year-end charts ===
Chart (2014)	Position
US Top Country Albums (Billboard)	61

=== Singles ===
Year	Single	Peak chart positions				
Year	Single	US Country	US Country Airplay	US	CAN Country	CAN
2013	"Whatever She's Got"	2	1	35	4	34
2014	"Kiss You Tonight"	25	17	103	—	—
"—" denotes releases that did not chart
