= Amy Dalley =

American singer-songwriter

- Origin: Kingsport, Tennessee, United States
- Genres: Country
- Occupation: Singer-songwriter
- Instrument: Vocals
- Years active: 2003–present
- Labels: Curb, Mad Jack

Amy Dalley is an American country music artist. Signed to Curb Records in 2003, she left the label in 2008. Dalley has released seven singles, of which five have entered the U.S. Billboard Hot Country Songs charts despite never releasing an album. Her highest-peaking single is "Men Don't Change", which reached a peak of number 23 in 2004. In addition to her own music, Dalley co-wrote Reba McEntire's single "My Sister". Her album, It's Time, was issued independently via digital retailers and as well as a physical copy in 2009.

== Biography ==
Dalley's first musical performance was at a talent show at her high school. She continued to perform around her hometown of Kingsport, Tennessee. After briefly attending East Tennessee State University, she went on to perform at the Dollywood amusement park. In 1994, she moved to Nashville, Tennessee and formed a band called the Gypsy Hillbillies, which toured nationally. She was later signed to a publishing deal at Hamstein Music. One of her songs, "Dream Too Small", was featured in an episode of Dawson's Creek.

Dalley's first single, "Love's Got an Attitude (It Is What It Is)", was released in 2003, peaking at No. 27 on the country charts. It was followed by "I Think You're Beautiful" at No. 43 and her highest-charting single, "Men Don't Change" at No. 23. Her fourth single, the No. 29 "I Would Cry", charted in 2005, and her album was delayed again. Later that same year, Reba McEntire charted the single "My Sister", which Dalley co-wrote with Roxie Dean.

In 2006, Dalley released "Good Kind of Crazy", which spent one week at No. 60 on the charts, and "Let's Try Goodbye", which did not chart either. She left Curb in 2008. She finally released her album It's Time through her label Mad Jack Records, on January 19, 2009, through online musical vendors. The album was produced by Dalley and Jack Sizemore and included re-recordings of her singles "I Think You're Beautiful", "Let's Try Goodbye", and "Men Don't Change".

Dalley released her second album Coming Out of the Pain on her label Mad Jack Records in 2011. It was re-released in 2012 on Rock Ridge Records.

== Discography ==
=== Albums ===
Title	Album details
It's Time	Release date: January 20, 2009; Label: Mad Jack Records
Coming Out of the Pain	Release date: August 30, 2011; March 27, 2012 (re-issue); Label: Mad Jack Records; Rock Ridge Music (re-issue)
Best Of	Release date: May 26, 2023; Label: Curb Records

=== Singles ===
Year	Single	Peak positions
Year	Single	US Country
2003	"Love's Got an Attitude (It Is What It Is)"	27
2003	"I Think You're Beautiful"	43
2004	"Men Don't Change"	23
2004	"I Would Cry"	29
2006	"Everybody's Got a Vice"	—
2007	"Good Kind of Crazy"	60
2007	"Let's Try Goodbye"	—
"—" denotes releases that did not chart

=== Music videos ===
Year	Video	Director
2003	"I Think You're Beautiful"	Roman White
2004	"Men Don't Change"	Michael Salomon
2005	"I Would Cry"	Michael Salomon
