= Somebody (Mark Wills song) =

2001 song by Mark Wills

Song by Mark Wills

from the album Loving Every Minute
- Released: August 21, 2001
- Recorded: 2001
- Genre: Country
- Length: 3:50
- Label: Mercury Nashville
- Songwriters: Dave Berg; Annie Tate; Sam Tate
- Producers: Carson Chamberlain, Keith Stegall

"Somebody"

Single by Reba McEntire

from the album Room to Breathe
- B-side: "Moving Oleta"
- Released: December 22, 2003
- Recorded: 2003
- Genre: Country
- Length: 3:50
- Label: MCA Nashville
- Songwriters: Dave Berg; Annie Tate; Sam Tate
- Producers: Buddy Cannon; Reba McEntire; Norro Wilson

Reba McEntire singles chronology
| "I'm Gonna Take That Mountain" (2003) | "Somebody" (2003) | "He Gets That from Me" (2004) |

"Somebody" is a country music song written by Dave Berg, Sam Tate, and Annie Tate. The song was originally recorded by American country music artist Mark Wills for his fourth studio album Loving Every Minute (2001). The song was later recorded by Reba McEntire as the second single from her 25th studio album Room to Breathe (2003) on December 22, 2003. The song was released rather quickly due to the underperformance of the album's lead single "I'm Gonna Take That Mountain", which had only reached number 14 on the country charts.

On the issue dated August 7, 2004, "Somebody" topped the Billboard Hot Country Singles & Tracks chart (now known as the Hot Country Songs chart) for one week, becoming McEntire's 22nd number one hit and her first since "If You See Him/If You See Her", her duet with Brooks & Dunn in 1998. It also became her 53rd top ten hit. "Somebody" would be McEntire's only country number one single of the 2000s decade, although her 2009 single, "Consider Me Gone", would top the country charts for four weeks in January 2010.

== Content ==
The protagonist, a male patron at a diner, vents to the waitress serving him about his so far unfruitful love life. The waitress reminds him to pay attention to the people around him because he'd never know where he might find the one for him, so he tries this in the elevator at his workplace. In the last verse, it is revealed that the protagonist and waitress ended up falling in love.

== Music video ==
A music video directed by Trey Fanjoy was released in February 2004. Reba mostly plays as a third party observer to the man in the lyrics while singing some of the verses in an empty diner. One day, Reba is saying goodbye to the waitress on her way out of the diner. The waitress does not see her usual client walk right into her, spilling two trays of food, and they bond while wiping each other off. Reba then greets another young man on the sidewalk, temporarily distracting him enough to run into a woman carrying groceries and possibly triggering another instant connection.

== Chart performance ==
The song debuted at number 55 on the U.S. Billboard Hot Country Singles & Tracks for the week ending January 17, 2004. The song reached No. 1 on the chart dated August 7, 2004, at which point a column in the magazine noted that the song's increase in airplay to the top position was likely due to stations being sponsored to play the song very heavily during the nighttime. As a result, it was only the fourth song since 1993, when the charts were first tabulated by counting spins, to gain by more than 1,000 spins in a week in its ascent to No. 1.

| Chart (2003–2004) | Peak position |
|---|---|
| US Hot Country Songs (Billboard) | 1 |
| US Billboard Hot 100 | 35 |

=== Year-end charts ===
| Chart (2004) | Position |
|---|---|
| US Country Songs (Billboard) | 16 |
