= Let It Rain (David Nail song) =

Single by David Nail featuring Sarah Buxton

from the album The Sound of a Million Dreams
- Released: February 7, 2011
- Genre: Country
- Length: 4:59 (album version); 3:42 (radio edit)
- Label: MCA Nashville
- Songwriter: David Nail; Jonathan Singleton
- Producer: Chuck Ainlay; Frank Liddell

David Nail singles chronology
"Turning Home" (2010)	"Let It Rain" (2011)	"The Sound of a Million Dreams" (2012)

"Let It Rain" is a song co-written and recorded by American country music singer David Nail. Sarah Buxton sings backing vocals on the song. It was released in February 2011 as the first single from his album The Sound of a Million Dreams, which was released in November 2011. It is his third Top 20, second Top 10 and first Top 5 hit on Hot Country Songs. On the chart week of January 21, 2012, it became both Nail's and Buxton's first Number One hit.

== Content ==
Co-writer Jonathan Singleton, who also co-wrote Nail's 2009 single "Red Light", told the website Taste of Country that they came up with the idea for the song while talking about movies that they enjoyed. They recalled the film The Last Kiss where "this guy cheats on his girlfriend, and he goes to her house and decides he’s going to sit on her porch until she lets him in." They said that they did not find the situation plausible and Singleton added, "If it was a southern girl or [David's wife] or my wife, the first thing they’d do is throw all our stuff on the porch with us." Instead of having the male narrator say "I deserve whatever I get, if she never talks to me again", Nail decided to have the character say "that I’m human just like everyone else and you mess up".

In May 2011, Taylor Swift posted on Twitter that she liked the song.

== Critical reception ==
Sam Gazdziak of Engine 145 gave the song a "thumbs up". He did not think that the song had "anything here to distinguish it as a country song" and thought that the song "does fall victim to the bombast", but praised Nail's voice and the details in the lyrics. Bobby Peacock of Roughstock rated it three-and-a-half stars out of five, also saying that the lyrics had "interesting details" and describing Nail as "strong [and] soulful", although he thought that the song's hook did not work because "there's no other 'rain' motif anywhere else".

== Music video ==
It debuted in April 2011; Stephen Shepherd directed. It features David singing while the woman he was with the night before showers and changes. He looks around and it appears he feels guilty.

== Chart performance ==
"Let It Rain" reached number one on its forty-ninth week on the Hot Country Songs chart, setting a new record for the slowest uninterrupted climb to the top in the chart's history.

=== Weekly charts ===
Chart (2011–2012)	Peak position
Canada Country (Billboard)	13
US Hot Country Songs (Billboard)	1
US Billboard Hot 100	51

=== Year-end charts ===
Chart (2011)	Position
US Country Songs (Billboard)	51

Chart (2012)	Position
US Country Songs (Billboard)	50

=== Decade-end charts ===
Chart (2010–2019)	Position
US Hot Country Songs (Billboard)	37

== Certifications ==
Region	Certification	Certified units/sales
United States (RIAA)	Platinum	1,000,000^{‡}
^{^} Shipments figures based on certification alone.
