= David Nail =

American country singer (born 1979)

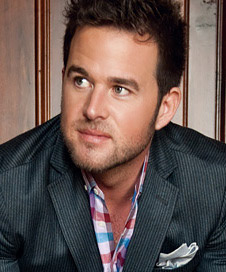
- Nail in 2011

Background information
- Born: David Brent Nail; May 18, 1979 (age 47); Kennett, Missouri, U.S.
- Genres: Country; Americana music
- Occupation: Singer-songwriter
- Instruments: Vocals, guitar
- Years active: 2001–2002; 2007–present
- Labels: Mercury Nashville; MCA Nashville; One Five Sound
- Website: davidnail.com

David Brent Nail (born May 18, 1979) is an American singer/songwriter and country music artist. In 2002, he debuted the single "Memphis" from an unreleased album for Mercury Records Nashville. Five years later, he signed with MCA Nashville, for which he has released four studio albums: I'm About to Come Alive, The Sound of a Million Dreams, I'm a Fire, and Fighter plus two extended plays, 1979 and Uncovered. The albums have produced seven chart entries on Hot Country Songs and Country Airplay, including two that have reached No. 1: "Let It Rain" (featuring Sarah Buxton) and "Whatever She's Got", plus the top 10 hit "Red Light".

== Career ==
David Nail's first recording contract was with Mercury Records Nashville, a division of Universal Music Group Nashville. While there, he recorded a self-titled debut album, which was produced by Keith Stegall and John Kelton. The lead-off single, "Memphis", reached number 52 on the Billboard Hot Country Singles & Tracks (now Hot Country Songs) charts. Deborah Evans Price gave the song a mostly-positive review, calling it a "solid performance" but saying that she considered its storyline implausible. Advance copies of the album were sent to radio stations, but it was not commercially released. He also sang backing vocals on the track "But I Can't Let You Go" on then-labelmate Meredith Edwards' 2001 album Reach.

=== I'm About to Come Alive and The Sound of a Million Dreams (2007–2012) ===
Nail signed to MCA Records Nashville, also a division of Universal Music Group Nashville, in April 2007. His debut album for the label, I'm About to Come Alive, was produced by Frank Liddell and Mike Wrucke, the same producers who work with Miranda Lambert. The album includes a duet with Lambert, co-writes with Kenny Chesney and Rascal Flatts' lead singer Gary LeVox, and five songs that Nail co-wrote.

The first single was "I'm About to Come Alive", originally recorded by Train on their 2003 album My Private Nation. Nail's version peaked at number 47 on the country chart. The second single, "Red Light," entered Top 40 in May 2009 and peaked at number 7. "Turning Home", which Chesney co-wrote with Scooter Carusoe, was the album's third single, reaching a peak of number 20.

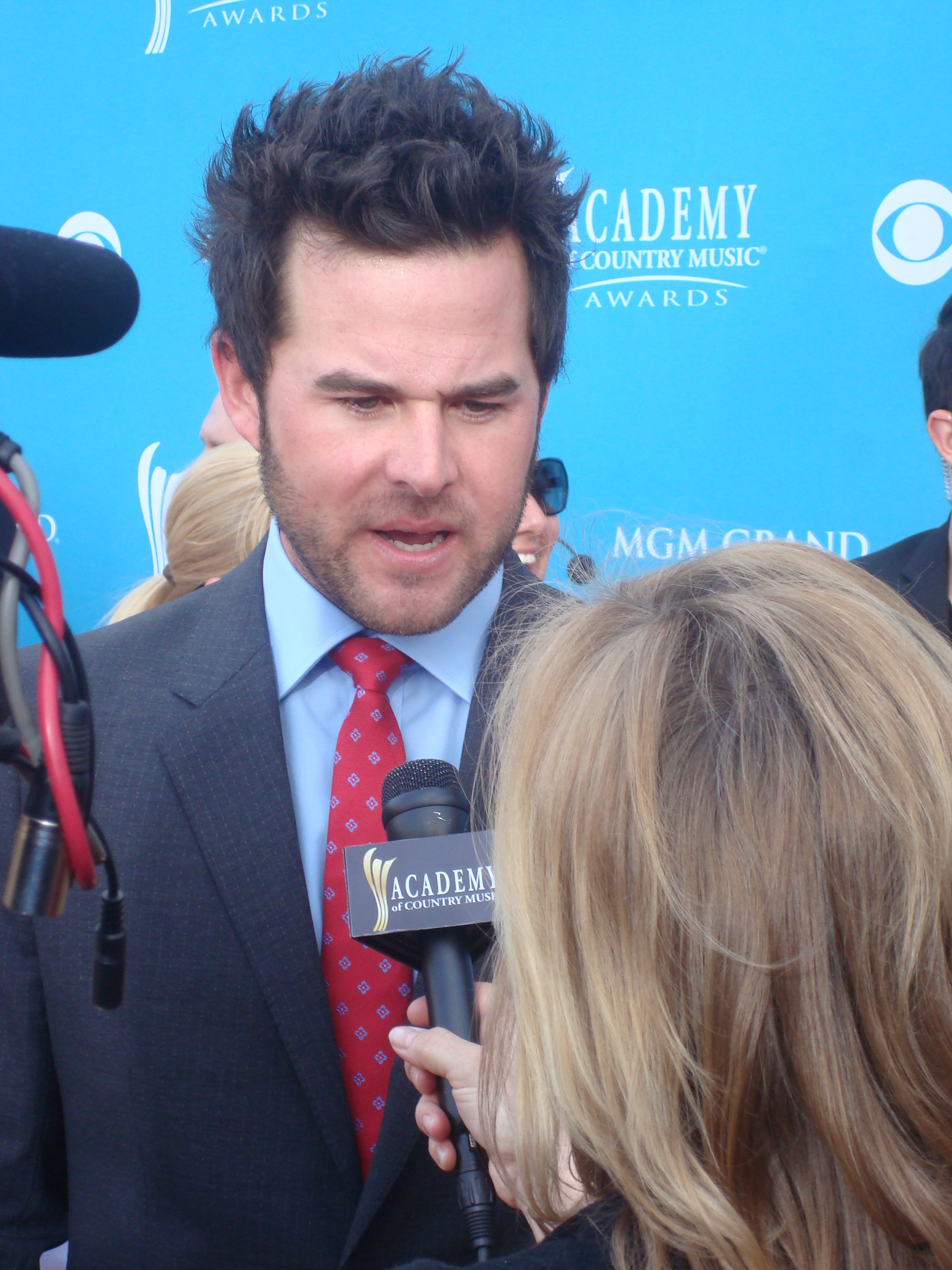
Nail being interviewed in 2010

In February 2011, Nail released his fifth single, "Let It Rain", which featured Sarah Buxton on guest vocals. It served as the lead-off single to his second studio album, The Sound of a Million Dreams, which was released on November 15, 2011. In January 2012, "Let It Rain" became Nail's first No. 1 hit. The title track was released as the album's second and final single, and reached a peak of number 38 on the Hot Country Songs chart.

Nail released a three-track digital EP titled 1979 on July 17, 2012. The EP includes a cover of Adele's "Someone like You".

=== I'm a Fire and Fighter (2013–2017) ===
A new single, "Whatever She's Got", was released to country radio on May 28, 2013. It served as the lead-off single to his third studio album, I'm a Fire, which was released on March 4, 2014. It reached number one on the Country Airplay chart in February 2014. The second single from the album was announced to be "Kiss You Tonight", co-written by David Cook, an American Idol winner.

On July 20, 2015, David Nail released a new single entitled "Night's on Fire." The song peaked at No. 14 on Country Airplay in July 2016, and served as the lead-off single to his fourth studio album Fighter.

In May 2016 he released an EP of covers titled "Uncovered." It included "In the Ghetto", "Can't Feel My Face", "In the Air Tonight", and "Send My Love (To Your New Lover)".

In September 2016, the album's second single, "Good at Tonight" featuring Brothers Osborne, was released to country radio. It failed to reach the Top 50 of the country charts and it was announced in early 2017 that David Nail had parted ways with MCA Nashville after 10 years with the label.

=== David Nail and The Well Ravens (2018) ===
In July 2018, Nail announced a new project as the frontman of the band David Nail & The Well Ravens. The band's first album titled Only This And Nothing More, was independently released on September 14, 2018.

Since the release of Only This And Nothing More, Nail has independently released five EPs and three stand-alone singles. He has consistently toured North America playing for tens of thousands of fans. In March 2025, he joined Vanity Fair to premiere their film Take No Prisoners which he recorded a cover of Bruce Cockburn's "Pacing The Cage" especially for. He announced in late 2025 that he is working with Anderson East who will produce his first full-length album since 2016, Fighter.

== Personal life ==
Nail was born and grew up in Kennett, Missouri, where his father was a high school band director. He married longtime girlfriend Catherine Werne on June 6, 2009, in Franklin, Tennessee. On December 12, 2015, Nail and Werne welcomed twins, son Lawson Brent Nail and daughter Lillian Catherine Nail. Their third child, daughter Ellie Britton, was born on October 19, 2020.

Nail participated in the 2010 Taco Bell All-Star Legends and Celebrity Softball Game, hitting a home run past the right-field fence in Angel Stadium.

He attended Arkansas State University where he was a member of Pi Kappa Alpha.

== Discography ==
=== Studio albums ===
Title	Album details	Peak chart positions		Sales
Title	Album details	US Country	US	Sales
I'm About to Come Alive	Release date: August 18, 2009; Label: MCA Nashville; Formats: CD, music download	19	71	
The Sound of a Million Dreams	Release date: November 15, 2011; Label: MCA Nashville; Formats: CD, music download	8	50	US: 75,000
I'm a Fire	Release date: March 4, 2014; Label: MCA Nashville; Formats: CD, music download	3	13	US: 91,000
Fighter	Release date: July 15, 2016; Label: MCA Nashville; Formats: CD, music download	3	26	US: 20,100
Flowers	Release date: 2026; Label: Independent; Formats: CD, music download			US:

=== Extended plays ===
Title	Album details	Peak chart positions		Sales
Title	Album details	US	US Independent	Sales
1979	Release date: July 17, 2012; Label: MCA Nashville; Formats: Digital download	—	—	
Uncovered	Release date: May 20, 2016; Label: MCA Nashville; Formats: Digital download	—	—	
Only This and Nothing More (as David Nail and The Well Ravens)	Release date: September 14, 2018; Label: One Five Sound; Formats: Digital download	86	29	US: 1,500
Oh, Mother	Release date: November 1, 2019; Label: One Five Sound; Formats: Digital download	—	—	
Bootheel 2020	Release date: December 11, 2021; Label: One Five Sound; Formats: Digital download	—	—	
Bootheel 2021	Release date: November 6, 2021; Label: One Five Sound; Formats: Digital download	—	—	
Best of Me	Release date: June 30, 2023; Label: One Five Sound; Formats: Digital download	—	—	
A Campfire Christmas	Release date: November 1, 2024; Label: One Five Sound; Formats: Digital download	—	—	

=== Singles ===
Year	Single	Peak chart positions					Certifications (sales threshold)	Album
Year	Single	US Country	US Country Airplay	US	CAN Country	CAN	Certifications (sales threshold)	Album
2002	"Memphis"	52		—	—	—		David Nail (unreleased)
2008	"I'm About to Come Alive"	47		—	—	—		I'm About to Come Alive
2009	"Red Light"	7		54	38	—	US: Platinum	I'm About to Come Alive
2010	"Turning Home"	20		—^{A}	—	—		I'm About to Come Alive
2011	"Let It Rain" (featuring Sarah Buxton)	1		51	13	—	US: Platinum	The Sound of a Million Dreams
2012	"The Sound of a Million Dreams"	38		—	—	—		The Sound of a Million Dreams
2013	"Whatever She's Got"	2	1	35	4	34	US: 3× Platinum	I'm a Fire
2014	"Kiss You Tonight"	25	17	—^{B}	—	—	US: Gold	I'm a Fire
2015	"Night's on Fire"	17	14	81	32	—	US: Platinum	Fighter
2016	"Good at Tonight" (featuring Brothers Osborne)	—	52	—	—	—		Fighter

- ^{A}"Turning Home" did not enter the Hot 100, but peaked at number 17 on Bubbling Under Hot 100 Singles.
- ^{B}"Kiss You Tonight" did not enter the Hot 100, but peaked at number 3 on Bubbling Under Hot 100 Singles.

=== Other charted songs ===
Year	Single	Peak chart positions		Album
Year	Single	US Country	US Country Airplay	Album
2012	"Someone like You"	52	49	1979
2015	"Broke My Heart"	46	—	I'm a Fire
"—" denotes releases that did not chart

=== Music videos ===
Year	Video	Director
2008	"I'm About to Come Alive"	Roman White
2009	"Red Light"	Roman White
2009	"Red Light" (acoustic version)	Matt Pfingsten
2010	"Turning Home"	Stephen Shepherd
2011	"Let It Rain"	Stephen Shepherd/David Nail
2012	"The Sound of a Million Dreams" (acoustic version)	Stephen Shepherd
2012	"Half Mile Hill"	Stephen Shepherd
2012	"The Sound of a Million Dreams"	Stephen Shepherd
2012	"Someone Like You"	Stephen Shepherd
2013	"Whatever She's Got"	Chris Hicky
2014	"Kiss You Tonight"	Chris Hicky
2015	"Night's on Fire"	Justin Key
2018	"Heavy"	—N/a
2023	"Best of Me"	Wales Toney
2024	"If I Could Call"	Wales Toney

== Awards and nominations ==
Year	Association	Category	Result
2010	Academy of Country Music	Single Record of the Year — "Red Light"	Nominated
2011	Grammy Awards	Male Country Vocal Performance — "Turning Home"	Nominated
2013	Academy of Country Music	Vocal Event of the Year — "Let It Rain" (with Sarah Buxton)	Nominated
