= Eighteen Visions discography =

- Studio albums: 8
- Extended plays: 3
- Singles: 10
- Music videos: 6

The discography of Eighteen Visions, an American metalcore band, consists of eight studio albums, three extended plays, seven singles and six music videos.

== Albums ==
=== Studio albums ===
List of studio albums, with selected chart positions
Title	Album details	Peak chart positions	
Title	Album details	US	US Ind.
Yesterday Is Time Killed	Released: March 1999; Label: Cedargate; Formats: CD	—	—
Until the Ink Runs Out	Released: August 8, 2000; Label: Trustkill; Formats: CD, LP, digital download	—	—
The Best of Eighteen Visions	Released: June 12, 2001; Label: Trustkill; Formats: CD, LP	—	—
Vanity	Released: May 14, 2002; Label: Trustkill; Formats: CD, digital download	—	—
Obsession	Released: June 15, 2004; Label: Trustkill; Formats: CD, digital download	147	7
Eighteen Visions	Released: July 18, 2006; Label: Trustkill, Epic; Formats: CD, digital download	74	—
XVIII	Released: June 2, 2017; Label: Rise; Formats: CD, LP, digital download	—	—
1996	Released: July 9, 2021; Label: Independent; Formats: Digital download	—	—
"—" denotes a recording that did not chart or was not released in that territory.

== Extended plays ==
List of extended plays
Title	EP details
Lifeless	Released: 1997; Label: Life Sentence; Formats: CD
No Time for Love	Released: 1999; Label: Trustkill; Formats: 7"
Inferno	Released: October 2, 2020; Label: Unsigned; Formats: Vinyl, digital download
Purgatorio	Released: November 2, 2023; Label: Unsigned; Formats: Vinyl, digital download

== Singles ==
List of singles, with selected chart positions, showing year released and album name
Title	Year	Peak chart positions		Album
Title	Year	US Main. Rock	UK	Album
"Vanity"	2002	—	—	Vanity
"You Broke Like Glass"	2003	—	—	Vanity
"Waiting for the Heavens"	2004	—	—	Obsession
"Tower of Snakes"	2004	—	—	Obsession
"I Let Go"	2005	—	83	Obsession
"Tonightless"	2006	38	—	Eighteen Visions
"Victim"	2006	15	—	Eighteen Visions
"Broken Hearted"	2006	38	—	Eighteen Visions
"Oath"	2017	—	—	XVIII
"Crucified"	2017	—	—	XVIII
"The Disease, the Decline, and Wasted Time"	2017	—	—	XVIII
"—" denotes a recording that did not chart or was not released in that territory.

== Other appearances ==
List of non-single guest appearances, showing year released and album name
Title	Year	Album
"Paradise City"	2004	Bring You to Your Knees: A Tribute to Guns N' Roses
"Quiet"	2005	The Killer in You: A Tribute to Smashing Pumpkins
"Champagne and Sleeping Pills"	2006	Threat: Music That Inspired the Movie
"The Beautiful People"	2006	Punk Goes '90s

== Music videos ==
List of music videos, showing year released and director
Title	Year	Director(s)
"You Broke Like Glass"	2003	Christopher Sims
"Waiting for the Heavens"	2004	Christopher Sims
"Tower of Snakes"	2004	Christopher Sims
"I Let Go"	2005	Zachary Merck
"Tonightless"	2006	—N/a
"Victim"	2006	Scott Duncan
