= Motionless and White =

Single by Eighteen Visions

from the album The Best of Eighteen Visions
- Released: 2002
- Recorded: March 2001
- Genre: Metalcore
- Length: 5:16
- Label: Trustkill Records
- Songwriter(s): Keith Barney, Ken Floyd, James Hart, Mick Morris, Brandan Schieppati
- Producer(s): Jeff Forrest

Eighteen Visions singles chronology
| "An Old Wyoming Song" (2001) | "Motionless and White" (2002) | "Gorgeous" (2002) |

"Motionless and White" is a song by Eighteen Visions. It is the only new song from the re-recording album The Best of Eighteen Visions. "Motionless and White" became a popular underground hit in parts of the UK and Western Australia, but undoubtedly the most successful in California, it ended up peaking #98 on the US Mainstream Rock Charting System. The song addresses the theme of drug use and reads as someone attempting to persuade a heavy user to break the addiction. "Motionless and White" was often the closing song of Eighteen Visions' sets, up until the release of their album Obsession.

The title of the song inspired the name of the band, Motionless in White.
