= Tonightless =

Single by Eighteen Visions

from the album Eighteen Visions
- Released: May 2, 2006
- Genre: Hard rock
- Length: 3:59
- Label: Trustkill Records; Epic Records
- Songwriter(s): Keith Barney, Ken Floyd, Trevor Friedrich, James Hart, Mick Morris
- Producer(s): Machine

Eighteen Visions singles chronology
"Obsession/Lost In A Dream" (2005)	"Tonightless" (2006)	"Victim" (2006)

"Tonightless" is the first single from Eighteen Visions' self-titled album. The CD was not released as a single, but rather as a promo, for radio, and collectors, along with an accompanying music video.

== Charts ==
Chart (2006)	Peak position
US Mainstream Rock (Billboard)	38

== Track listing ==
1. "Tonightless (Single Version)" (3:59)
