= XVIII (album) =

Studio album by Eighteen Visions
- Released: June 2, 2017
- Genres: Metalcore; post-hardcore
- Length: 35:23
- Label: Rise
- Producer: Mick Kenney

Eighteen Visions chronology
Eighteen Visions (2006)	XVIII (2017)	1996 (2021)

Singles from XVIII
- 1. "Oath" Released: April 20, 2017; 2. "Crucified" Released: May 9, 2017; 3. "The Disease, The Decline, and Wasted Time" Released: May 25, 2017

Professional ratings
Review scores
Source	Rating
Lambgoat	8/10 stars
Kill Your Stereo	(80/100)
Louder Sound	3.5/5 stars

XVIII (18 in Roman numerals) is the seventh studio album by Eighteen Visions. It was released on June 2, 2017. It is the band's first album in 11 years, following its breakup in 2007. It is also the band's first release on Rise Records. According to Metal Insider, the album sold 3,525 units in its first week. The album peaked at number 49 on the Billboard Top Current Albums chart. In a 2017 interview with LouderSound, James Hart stated that XVIII was the record he wanted to be remembered for, adding that the record really spoke for who the band is and who they always have been, and encompassed the sound that the band liked the most from each of its prior albums.

== Background ==
In a 2021 interview on the podcast "Chattin' With Captain", James Hart explained that the band had attempted to reform twice before 2017: once in 2012 and once in 2014. Keith Barney and Hart had written a few songs together during this time. In 2016 Keith had approached Hart and asked if he'd like to finish the songs. Hart agreed and reached out to Trevor Friedrich and Ken Floyd to include them in the writing process. Floyd would decline based on his workload, but the trio got together and started to record some of the old and new songs. Originally reluctant to use the name Eighteen Visions for their new endeavor (as Floyd was not involved), they ultimately decided they'd like to play Eighteen Visions songs live, and that their new material sounded like Eighteen Visions, so they might as well use the name. The trio originally set out to create new a new album that would sound like a combination of their first five releases, but as the recording process continued they decided that they wanted their new effort to be heavy, as that was what they felt the band was.

Announcing its reunion, the band launched an official Instagram account on February 9, 2017. The account's first post featured the message "the countdown begins..." as well as the text "XVIII". Tagged in the account's first post were James Hart, Keith Barney, and Trevor Friedrich. All three members uploaded the same picture onto their respective private accounts as well.

On April 20, 2017, exactly ten years from the day of its farewell live performance, the band announced its sixth studio album, "XVIII", which would be released on June 2, 2017 via its new label Rise Records. The band also announced that it would perform its first show in ten years on June 2 at The Observatory in Santa Ana, California to celebrate the release of the record. Alongside this announcement was the band's first new song in 11 years, and the debut single for the album, "Oath". MetalSucks noted the song sounded like a more polished version of something that would be found on Until the Ink Runs Out, and was heavier than anticipated.

On May 9, 2017, the band released the second single from the album, "Crucified", via Loudwire. The song included a lyric video on YouTube. Similar to "Oath", the song was under two minutes in length and marked the return of heavy screaming as a prominent element of the band's sound. In an interview with Loudwire, guitarist Keith Barney noted the band felt they needed something fast, and the band hadn't written anything as fast as "Crucified" since Vanity. He also added that the breakdown in "Crucified" ended up being the first teaser for the album on the band's Instagram and "everyone lost their s--t" so the band were happy to be fully releasing the song as a single.

On May 25, 2017, the third and final single from the album, "The Disease, The Decline, and Wasted Time" was released.

On June 2, 2017, the band released a music video for the track "Live Again", which Barney noted in an interview with Loudwire was a tribute to the late Mick Morris, the band's former bassist.

In a June 2017 interview with Exclaim!, Barney revealed that founding member, guitarist Ken Floyd, could not take part in the reunion due to his full-time job as a tour manager for Zedd. He also reported that the band decided not to replace the late Mick Morris with any other bass players, primarily out of respect for him. Instead, his bass tracks will be used at live shows for the songs released prior to 2017. Barney noted that discussion of a reunion began in 2012 but dissolved due to Barney's blossoming career as a graphic designer. Discussion began again a few years later when Mick Kenney heard a demo of "The Disease, The Decline, and Wasted Time" in the car of Trevor Friedrich, who was also his roommate. Kenny convinced Friedrich to let him record the song and things snowballed into an EP, and then an album, from there.

On August 28, 2017, the band announced via its Instagram that Stick to Your Guns guitarist Josh James would become an official member of the band. James, formerly of Evergreen Terrace and Casey Jones, had supported the group as a live guitarist and had appeared in the music video for "Oath".

In a September 4, 2017, interview with the Lead Singer Syndrome podcast, Hart revealed that the band contemplated reunion as early as 2010 and, later on, in 2013. However, the idea was eventually called off due to various reasons. It was also stated that the track "The Disease, the Decline, and Wasted Time" was written back then.

On October 18, 2017, the band released a music video for the song "Underneath My Gun". The video features Every Time I Die guitarist and professional wrestler Andy Williams. The video takes inspiration from the John Carpenter film They Live, with Andy assuming the role of Roddy Piper and the band portraying the alien scum. The song itself opens with a quotation from the movie.

== Track listing ==
No.	Title	Length
1.	"Crucified"	2:02
2.	"The Disease, The Decline, And Wasted Time"	4:49
3.	"Underneath My Gun"	3:47
4.	"Live Again"	3:51
5.	"Laid To Waste In The Shit Of Man"	4:05
6.	"Oath"	2:00
7.	"Spit"	4:26
8.	"Picture Perfect"	2:36
9.	"Fake Leather Jacket"	4:05
10.	"For This I Sacrifice"	3:39
Total length:		35:23

== Personnel ==
- James Hart - lead vocals, lyrics
- Keith Barney - lead guitar, rhythm guitar, bass, piano, keyboards, backing vocals
- Trevor Friedrich - drums, percussion

== Charts ==
Chart (2017)	Peak position
US Top Hard Rock Albums (Billboard)	14
US Top Album Sales (Billboard)	58
US Independent Albums (Billboard)	9
