= Broken Hearted =

Single by Eighteen Visions

from the album Eighteen Visions
- Released: 2006
- Genre: Alternative rock, hard rock
- Length: 3:40
- Label: Trustkill Records; Epic Records
- Songwriters: Keith Barney, Ken Floyd, Trevor Friedrich, James Hart, Mick Morris
- Producer: Machine

Eighteen Visions singles chronology
"Victim" (2006)	"Broken Hearted" (2006)	"Our Darkest Days" (2007)

"Broken Hearted" was the third single from Eighteen Visions self-titled album. The song was released as a radio single, with no music video as of now. The CD was not released as a single, but rather as a promo, for radio, and collectors.

== Charts ==
Chart (2007)	Peak position
US Mainstream Rock (Billboard)	38

== Track listing ==
1. "Broken Hearted" (3:40)
