= Victim (Eighteen Visions song) =

Single by Eighteen Visions

from the album Eighteen Visions
- Released: August 8, 2006
- Length: 2:58
- Label: Trustkill Records; Epic Records
- Songwriter(s): Keith Barney, Ken Floyd, Trevor Friedrich, James Hart, Mick Morris,
- Producer(s): Machine

Eighteen Visions singles chronology
| "Tonightless" (2006) | "Victim" (2006) | "Broken Hearted" (2007) |

"Victim" was the second single from Eighteen Visions self-titled album. The song was featured as the theme song to WWE Vengeance in 2006, in the 2006 video game ATV Offroad Fury 4, and has had much airplay on the radio stations. The CD was not released as a single, but rather as a promo, for radio, and collectors.

== Charts ==
| Chart (2006) | Peak position |
|---|---|
| US Mainstream Rock (Billboard) | 15 |

== Featured on ==
"Victim" was featured on the popular sportbike freestyle video "Mass Mayhem 3". The song was originally in the Saw III soundtrack but it was instead replaced with "Your Nightmare".

== Track listing ==
1. "Victim" (2:58)

== Video ==
- The song's music video was shot in the Hewitt residence from The Texas Chainsaw Massacre film.
- The Victim video is also featured on the WWE Vengeance DVD.
