= The Best of Eighteen Visions =

The Best Of Eighteen Visions

Studio album by Eighteen Visions
- Released: June 12, 2001
- Recorded: March 2001
- Genre: Metalcore
- Length: 42:53
- Label: Trustkill, Sober Mind
- Producer: Jeff Forrest

Eighteen Visions chronology
Until the Ink Runs Out (2000)	The Best Of Eighteen Visions (2001)	Vanity (2002)

Professional ratings
Review scores
Source	Rating
AllMusic	3/5 stars

The Best of Eighteen Visions is the third full-length album by American metalcore band Eighteen Visions. It was released on compact disc and compact cassette on June 12, 2001, through American record label Trustkill Records, and on 12-inch vinyl through Belgian record label Sobermind Records.

Despite its title, it is not a compilation of previously released material; all of the material was newly recorded especially for this release. Its title hints to the fact that for this release, the band chose the best material from their prior out-of-print releases and re-recorded these songs to create a new album. It also includes the newly-written song "Motionless and White", from which American metalcore band Motionless in White derived its name.

The release was in planning since 1999, when the band first signed with Trustkill Records. It was originally planned to simply re-package the songs from Lifeless and Yesterday Is Time Killed on a single eighteen-song release, before it was decided that all of the material should be re-recorded with its new members. The material was recorded between February and March 2001, with producer Jeff Forest at Doubletime Studios in Santee, California.

Two songs were re-recorded from their debut EP Lifeless: "Slipping Through the Hands of God" and "Life's Blood." Five songs were re-recorded from their first full-length album Yesterday Is Time Killed: "The Psychotic Thought," "An Old Wyoming Song," "Raping, Laughing, Tasting, Temptation," "Five 'O Six A.M. Three/Fifteen," and "Dead Rose." And all three songs from their second EP No Time for Love were re-recorded: "Russian Roulette with a Trigger Happy Manic Depressive," "Isola in the Rain," and "Diana Gone Wrong."

== Track listing ==
No.	Title	Original release	Length
1.	"Motionless and White"	Previously unreleased	5:16
2.	"Russian Roulette with a Trigger Happy Manic Depressive"	No Time for Love	3:13
3.	"The Psychotic Thought"	Yesterday Is Time Killed	4:17
4.	"An Old Wyoming Song"	Yesterday Is Time Killed	3:49
5.	"Slipping Through the Hands of God"	Lifeless	3:17
6.	"Diana Gone Wrong"	No Time for Love	3:56
7.	"Raping, Laughing, Tasting, Temptation"	Yesterday Is Time Killed	4:33
8.	"Five 'O Six A.M. Three/Fifteen"	Yesterday Is Time Killed	4:51
9.	"Life's Blood"	Lifeless	2:51
10.	"Isola in the Rain"	No Time for Love	1:23
11.	"Dead Rose"	Yesterday Is Time Killed	5:23
Total length:			42:53

== Personnel ==
- James Hart – lead vocals
- Brandan Schieppati – guitar, backing vocals
- Keith Barney – guitar, artwork, layout
- Mick Morris – bass
- Ken Floyd – drums
