= Dirty Little Girl =

Dirty Little Girl may refer to:

- "Dirty Little Girl", a 1973 song by Elton John from Goodbye Yellow Brick Road
- "Dirty Little Girl", a 2009 song by Burn Halo from their self-titled debut
