= Lifeless =

Lifeless may refer to:

- Dead, having lost life
- Lifeless (EP), the first release by Eighteen Visions
- Lifeless (Mark Billingham novel), BCA 2006 crime thriller of the year nominee
- Lifeless Planet, a 2014 video game

== See also ==
- Deathless (disambiguation)
