= Until the Ink Runs Out =

Studio album by Eighteen Visions
- Released: March 1, 2000
- Studios: Doubletime Studios, San Diego, California
- Genre: Metalcore
- Length: 43:40
- Labels: Trustkill, Goodlife
- Producer: Jeff Forrest

Eighteen Visions chronology
No Time for Love (1999)	Until the Ink Runs Out (2000)	The Best of Eighteen Visions (2001)

2025 re-recorded cover
- Until The Ink Runs Out 2025 re-recorded cover.

Professional ratings
Review scores
Source	Rating
AllMusic	2/5 stars

Until The Ink Runs Out is the second full-length album released by metalcore band Eighteen Visions. It is often considered to be the bands' finest release by much of the older fans, as well as the record that gathered national attention for the band, due to the rising of Trustkill Records.

The album was recorded in a four-day session at Doubletime Studios, where they had previously recorded twice (once for a demo sometime in 1999, and once for the No Time for Love session) for a budget of just over one grand. This was the band's first release to feature Keith Barney on guitar, and would ultimately be the last to feature Javier van Huss on bass.

Good Life Recordings 12" vinyl came out first. The vinyl had the words "Hair Dressers of the World" on side A and "Unite!" on side B on the matrix runout. It was limited to a pressing of 1000 on black and 200 on pink. Trustkill then released the CD version which first came in digipaks, but in pressings after 2002 it was released in jewel case. The CD version listed "Elevator Music" and "The Nothing" as combined songs, while on the vinyl they are actually on different sides of the record). The CD omits "Elevator Music", which is a dark ambient interlude intended to split the album in half (finish the A side in the case of the vinyl). "Prelude to an Epic" was combined with "Flowers for Ingrid" on the CD, though this time the songs are both intact.

The album featured a multitude of film references, including the intro from "She's a Movie Produced Masterpiece" being taken from Back to the Future (1985) and an intro and outro for "Champagne and Sleeping Pills" from The Shining (1980). The intro from "That ain't Elvis playing Piano" is from The Dorsey Brothers "Stage Show" recorded in 1956. The ending from "The Nothing" is taken from the closing scene of The Elephant Man (1980).

It is during this era and touring that the band defined themselves and created the style of "fashioncore", which at the time was simply to be different from the over done dressing of the metalcore scene (sports jersey and baggy jeans). For the tour, the band painted the amps and mic stands of gold paint and set up various doll heads around the stage, which were written and drawn on by James and Javier, who were finishing up beauty school. The tour proved to be somewhat disastrous for the band at this time, first missing a total of 9 shows within a month, mostly due to van problems, and the cold fronts building up between Javier and the rest of the band. In fact, directly after the return home from the 18 Visions/Throwdown tour, Javier was told by a friend of the band that he was being replaced by Mick Morris of the band xClearx, which the band had played some shows with earlier.

"Prelude to an Epic" was later re-recorded as "The Epic" for a bonus track on their self-titled album.

On 30 May 2025, the 25th anniversary of the album's release, a fully re-recorded version of the album was released featuring redone cover art. This version of the album removed "The Elevator" and split "Prelude to an Epic" and "Flowers for Ingrid" into separate tracks.

Loudwire named the album 21st on their list of "25 Best Metalcore Albums of All Time".

== Track listing ==
1. "She Looks Good in Velvet" - 3:35
2. "She's a Movie Produced Masterpiece" - 5:10
3. "Champagne and Sleeping Pills" - 6:14
4. "Who the Fuck Killed John Lennon?" / "Elevator Music" - 5:24
5. "The Nothing" - 5:29
6. "Wine 'Em, Dine 'Em, Sixty-Nine 'Em" - 3:47
7. "That Ain't Elvis Playing Piano" - 3:48
8. "Revolutionizing the Sound of Music" - 3:46
9. "Prelude to an Epic" / "Flowers for Ingrid" - 6:27

== Credits ==
Eighteen Visions

- James Hart – lead vocals
- Keith Barney – lead guitar
- Brandan Schieppati – rhythm guitar, vocals
- Javier van Huss – bass, piano, keyboards
- Ken Floyd – drums, percussion, programming, guitars, cowbell, album layout

Additional

- Jeff Forrest – producer, keyboards
- Troy Peace – artwork and logos
- John Golden – mastering
