= Deathless =

Deathless may refer to:

Religion

- Immortal, having eternal life
- Amrita, concept in Hinduism and Buddhism

Arts

- Deathless (Throwdown album), 2009
- Deathless (Revocation album), 2014
- Deathless (Miss May I album), 2015
- Deathless (novel), a fantasy novel by Catherynne M. Valente

== See also ==
- Lifeless (disambiguation)
