= Haymaker (album) =

Studio album by Throwdown
- Released: July 1, 2003
- Genre: Metalcore, hardcore punk
- Length: 57:55
- Label: Trustkill, Pit Viper Records (2023 re-release)
- Producer: Dave Peters, Dom Macaluso, Greg Koller

Throwdown chronology
You Don't Have to Be Blood to Be Family (2001)	Haymaker (2003)	Vendetta (2005)

Professional ratings
Review scores
Source	Rating
AllMusic	3/5 stars

Haymaker is the third full-length release by American band Throwdown. The album involves guest vocals from Scott Vogel from Terror and Chad Gilbert from New Found Glory.

In 2023, Haymaker was re-mastered by Zeuss and re-released on vinyl, cassette and compact disc, celebrating its 20th anniversary.

== Track listing ==
All lyrics are written by Dave Peters, Keith Barney, Tommy Love, Dom Macaluso, Jarrod Alexander; all music is composed by Dave Peters, Keith Barney, Tommy Love, Dom Macaluso, Jarrod Alexander.

No.	Title	Length
1.	"Intro (Never Back Down)"	2:20
2.	"Walk Away"	3:01
3.	"Nothing Left" (featuring Scott Vogel)	3:02
4.	"You Can't Kill Integrity"	3:51
5.	"Forever"	3:38
6.	"Hopeless"	2:53
7.	"Declare Your War"	2:27
8.	"False Idols"	2:59
9.	"Slip"	3:03
10.	"Hate for the Weak"	2:48
11.	"The Only Thing" (featuring Chad Gilbert)	2:00
12.	"Step It Up"	2:39
13.	"Face the Mirror"	3:30
14.	"Raise Your Fist" (The song "Raise Your Fist" ends at minute 3:20. It is followed by 12:30 of silence [3:20 – 15:50]. After the silence begins a hidden dialogue.)	19:38
Total length:		57:55

== Personnel ==
Throwdown

- Dave Peters – vocals, assistant producer
- Keith Barney – guitar
- Tommy Love – guitar
- Dom Macaluso – bass, assistant producer
- Jarrod Alexander – drums

Guest artists and collaborations

- Chad Gilbert – guest vocals (New Found Glory and Shai Hulud)
- Scott Vogel – guest vocals (Terror and Buried Alive)
- Scott Bradford – legal advisor
- Kirk Catlin – lyric adaptations
- Three Daves and a Kirk (Three channels of Dave Peters and one of Kirk Catlin) – backing vocals

Image and layout

- Jeff Gros – photography
- Dave McDermott – booking (New Zealand For Dynamo Productions)
- Graham Nixon – booking (Australia For Resist Booking)
- Matt Pike – booking (U.S. For The Kenmore Agency)

Production

- Gene Grimaldi – mastering
- Greg Koller – producer, engineer
- Dave Peters – producer (assistant producer)
- Dom Macaluso – producer (assistant producer)

== Vinyl ==
Haymaker was pressed on vinyl in 2003 by Trustkill Records and re-pressed in 2008 as a double LP with Vendetta. It was re-mastered and re-released in 2023 via Pit Viper Records.

Copies (2003)	Color
850 copies	Blood Red & White
550 copies	Blood Red
350 copies	Camo
250 copies	Clear Black
Copies (2008)	Color
600 copies	Blue & Orange
332 copies	Brown & Red
4 copies	Test Press
Copies (2023)	Color
219 copies	Black
219 copies	Blood Splatter
199 copies	Red/Black Galaxy
225 copies	Gray/Black Marble
