= Vanity (Eighteen Visions album) =

Studio album by Eighteen Visions
- Released: August 13, 2002 (original); January 25, 2005 (re-issue)
- Recorded: Dec. 2001 – Jan. 2002
- Studio: F1 Studios
- Genres: Metalcore; hardcore punk
- Length: 60:00
- Labels: Trustkill (TK0038)
- Producer: Greg Koller

Eighteen Visions chronology
The Best of Eighteen Visions (2001)	Vanity (2002)	Obsession (2004)

2005 reissue cover
- Vanity 2005 reissue cover.

2020 re-recorded cover
- Vanity 2020 re-recorded cover.

2022 re-recorded cover
- Vanity 2022 re-recorded cover.

Professional ratings
Review scores
Source	Rating
AllMusic	3/5 stars
Lambgoat	7/10 stars
Punknews.org	.5/5 stars

Vanity is the fourth full-length studio album, and seventh overall release, by American metalcore band Eighteen Visions. It was their first album to feature a music video, which was for "You Broke Like Glass". It was the last album to feature guitarist Brandan Schieppati as he left immediately after the recording of the album to focus on Bleeding Through. The band toured for the album with a single guitarist, Keith Barney. As of 2007, the album has sold over 100,000 copies in the United States.

Most critics and fans consider Vanity to be their final metalcore album, the band moving towards a more melodic and accessible sound after this. It should however be noted that the band considered this change to have begun prior to this album, with the recording of "Motionless and White" which was featured on The Best of Eighteen Visions the year before. Hart's improved vocal style led the band to write more melodic song structure rather than their previous technical metalcore compositions.

== Background ==
During the summer of 2001, Eighteen Visions toured alongside Bleeding Through as well as Spitfire. In November of 2001, Vanity was announced with a March release date. The album was set to include 12 new tracks including "A Short Walk Down a Long Hallway" and "So Low." The band then toured in the winter of 2002 alongside Mushroomhead, Five Pointe O, and Lamb of God. Additionally in the winter of 2001–2002, Eighteen Visions recorded and mixed Vanity with Greg Koller at F1 Studios. It was shared that the album would feature 13 tracks, be about 55 minutes in length, and feature guest vocals from Howard Jones, Ryan Downey, Alex Vaz, and Nikki Bevier. the band would also launch a new website to coincide with the album's release, now expected for April or May of 2002. In May of 2002, the layout for the album was completed by John LaCroix and The Plan Design, a shop belonging to guitairist Keith Barney. The album's artwork was shared via the band's new website. Although recording was finished in February, delays in design due to touring pushed the album's release date back to August. the band would then tour alongside Martyr A.D., Hopesfall, and Every Time I Die. In June, it was announced that the album would debut on August 13. It was also shared that fans would be able to hear some of the album in advance via a free two-song CD sampler, available at festivals like Hellfest, Furnace Fest, and Warped Tour. In July of 2002, Brandan Scheippati would depart the band to focus on Bleeding Through.

== Album versions ==
To promote the release of the album, Trustkill also issued a 7" single, which included the title track, "Vanity", and the then considered single "I Don't Mind". The 7" was pressed in quantities of 1,000 each on red and white, and 200 on pink. Good Life Recordings also released a 12" pictured vinyl limited to 1,000 copies.

The album was re-issued on January 25, 2005 as part of Trustkill Records re-issue calendar (which also saw Bleeding Through's This Is Love, This Is Murderous get the same treatment simultaneously). It featured new artwork and the album now had an enhanced video section which included the music video for "You Broke Like Glass," the only single from the album. This also provided a chance for the track listing to be fixed, as the song "There is Always" was left off on the original CD covers of the album. It should, however, be noted that the picture LP released by Good Life does not feature the listing of either "interludes" on the album, "The Notes of My Reflection" and "There is Always". The possibilities that "The Notes of My Reflection" was actually mistakenly left on the track listing is often wondered. Nevertheless, both interludes are listed on the reissues' track listing.

In February of 2020, the band shared that the album would once again be re-issued, alongside digital downloads of the title-track "Vanity" and "You Broke Like Glass." The 2020 re-release consisted of a hot pink/baby pink pressing limited to 100 copies and a hot-pink/transparent pressing limited to 200. At the same time they released re-recorded versions of "Vanity" and "You Broke Like Glass". These re-issues sold out in only a few hours, leading the band to do two more pressings, one being a splattered hot pink and blue/transparent, which was limited to 100 pressings, and a baby-blue/baby-pink pressing that was limited to 150 pressings.

On July 5, 2022, the band released a new recording of Vanity in support of the 20th anniversary of the original album. The 2022 version is noted for being played one full step down, in drop A tuning instead of drop B. The new recordings of "Vanity" and "You Broke Like Glass" are different from those of 2020.

== Film references ==
As with most records by Eighteen Visions, there are a multitude of film quotes and references within the album. Until the band's comeback release XVIII, Vanity was the final album to feature audio samples from films, possibly due to the fact that the band's following two albums would be co-distributed by Sony.

- The sample in the intro from "One Hell of a Prize Fighter" is taken from the 1985 film River's Edge.
- The sample in the intro from "The Critic" is taken from the 1982 film Fast Times At Ridgemont High.
- The song title "Sonic Death Monkey" is taken from a fictitious band in the 2000 film High Fidelity.
- The entire sample throughout "There is Always" is actually the theme song from the 1962 film The Manchurian Candidate, although original composer David Amram is uncredited, and the band members claimed songwriting credits on their ASCAP publishing registration.

== Track listing ==
1. "Vanity" – 5:46
2. "Fashion Show" – 4:13
3. "One Hell of a Prize Fighter" – 5:14
4. "I Don't Mind" – 4:38
5. "The Notes of My Reflection" – 1:36
6. "A Short Walk Down a Long Hallway" – 4:17
7. "The Critic" – 4:19
8. "Gorgeous" – 2:52
9. "You Broke Like Glass" – 3:08
10. "In the Closet" – 3:16
11. "Sonic Death Monkey" – 5:21
12. "There is Always" – 1:41
13. "Love in Autumn" – 13:33

"Love in Autumn" ends at 5:10 followed by silence until 12:23, at which point a phone conversation fades in which leads to the end of the track.

"Gorgeous", "There is Always", and "Love in Autumn" are not included in the 2022 re-recording.

The track listing on the 2002 CD omits "The Notes of My Reflection" and incorrectly places "The Critic" after "You Broke You Glass".

== Personnel ==
Credits are adapted from the album's liner notes.

Eighteen Visions

- James Hart – lead vocals
- Keith Barney – guitar, backing vocals
- Brandan Schieppati – guitar
- Mick Morris – bass guitar
- Ken Floyd – drums; guitar and vocals on "Gorgeous"

Guest musicians

- Howard Jones – additional vocals on "One Hell of a Prize Fighter"
- Corey Darst – additional vocals on "A Short Walk Down a Long Hallway"
- Alex Vaz – additional vocals on "The Critic"
- Ryan J. Downey – additional vocals on "Sonic Death Monkey"

Production

- John Lacroix – design and layout
- Greg Koller – recording engineer and producer at F1 Studios
