= Jason Shrout =

American drummer (born 1980)

- Also known as: Shrout
- Born: Jason Shrout; October 31, 1980
- Origin: Kansas City, Missouri
- Genres: Hardcore punk Punk rock Metalcore; Hardcore; Rock
- Occupation: Musician
- Instrument: Drums
- Years active: 1995–present
- Labels: Recorse; Trustkill; Epic; Hardware; Disgorge Media; Cowabunga; Sorry State

Jason Shrout (born October 31, 1980) is an American drummer from Kansas City, Missouri. He played drums for Orange County, California's Eighteen Visions (2003–2004), as well as Kansas City metalcore band Saved by Grace (1999–2003), and Kansas City hardcore punk bands Nervous Wreck (2005–2007), and Black Mark (2008). He also did some time filling in on tour with Love Is Red in 2002.

Prior to forming Saved By Grace, Shrout also played in some other lesser-known bands in the mid to late 90's, and also had a couple side projects in the early 2000s that kept him busy when Saved By Grace wasn't on the road. He is artist endorser with Kansas City Drum Company, a custom company he has been with since 2004. As of early 2010, Shrout joined Kansas City hardcore punk band Dark Ages. In 2011, Dark Ages released their first LP, titled "Can America Survive?", on Sorry State Records. According to Sorry State in 2014, the band has a second LP that will be coming out TBA.

While still playing in Dark Ages, Jason Shrout was seen playing drums for the reunited 1990s Seattle band Trial on a west coast tour in the spring of 2012. It is not known if Shrout will do any future dates with them.

In early 2013, Shrout joined Kansas City metallic hardcore band Renouncer. Also, Nervous Wreck reunited and played one show in May 2014. It is unknown if they are still active or planning anything further.
