= Eighteen Visions (album) =

Studio album by Eighteen Visions
- Released: July 18, 2006
- Genres: Heavy metal; hard rock; nu metal
- Length: 46:33
- Labels: Epic, Trustkill
- Producer: Machine

Eighteen Visions chronology
| Obsession (2004) | Eighteen Visions (2006) | XVIII (2017) |

Singles from Eighteen Visions
- 1. "Tonightless" Released: May 2, 2006; 2. "Victim" Released: August 8, 2006; 3. "Broken Hearted" Released: 2006

Professional ratings
Review scores
| Source | Rating |
|---|---|
| AllMusic | 4/5 stars |
| TuneLab Music | (7.9/10) |
| Rocklouder | (4.4/5) |
| Melodic | 4.5/5 stars |
| Punknews.org | 2/5 stars |

Eighteen Visions is the sixth studio album by Eighteen Visions, released on July 18, 2006. It was the band's only album released on Epic Records. This album saw the band take a step away from its metalcore roots in favor of a new, more melodic tone and featuring "deep-throated, group-oriented arena styled rock vocals." Some countries have added two bonus tracks. One is taken from a Truskill records compilation called "Trustkill Takeover Volume II". The second is a re-recorded version of the track "Prelude to an Epic" from their album Until the Ink Runs Out. The album has sold around 100,000+ copies in the U.S. The album peaked at #74 in the U.S. Billboard chart.

== Background ==
Following the release of Obsession in June 2004, Eighteen Visions embarked on a number of tours alongside acts including Killswitch Engage, From Autumn To Ashes, 36 Crazyfists, Lostprophets, Misery Signals, Remembering Never, and He Is Legend.

In October 2005, the band shared that they were busy writing material for their upcoming Epic Records debut. The band shared that they had enough material for a double LP but were looking to pair down to 12-13 songs. They additionally shared that pre-production would officially begin on November 7th, and that the album would be available for purchase in June 2006. In December 2005, the band entered the studio with producer Machine to begin recording. In an interview with MTV.com, vocalist James Hart compared the record's sound to a mix between Def Leppard and Stone Temple Pilots, likening the shift in the band's musical direction to what fellow Orange County metalcore outfit Avenged Sevenfold did with their release City of Evil.

The band posted a music video for the track "Victim" in late June 2006 via the Trustkill Records website. The video for the track was directed by Scott Duncan, and was shot at the same location as the basement fight scenes featured in the movie "Fight Club." The video debuted on MTV2's Headbangers Ball on July 15.

The band announced their break-up in 2007.

== Track listing ==
All tracks written by Eighteen Visions.

1. "Our Darkest Days" – 2:52
2. "Victim" – 3:00
3. "Truth or Consequence" – 4:15
4. "Burned us Alive" – 3:43
5. "Black and Bruised" – 3:21
6. "Broken Hearted" – 4:06
7. "Pretty Suicide" – 4:16
8. "Coma" – 3:36
9. "The Sweetest Memory" – 4:10
10. "Last Night" – 3:38
11. "Your Nightmare" – 3:30
12. "Tonightless" – 5:40

Bonus tracks
13. "All We've Got" – 3:39
14. "The Epic" (re-recording of "Prelude to an Epic") – 2:29

== Featured in ==
- Both "Victim" and "Black and Bruised" were featured in the sportbike freestyle DVD, Mass Mayhem 3, produced by Evil Twins Productions.
- "Victim" was chosen as the theme song for World Wrestling Entertainment's 2006 pay per view event "Vengeance."

== Personnel ==
- James Hart – lead vocals, lyrics
- Kenneth Floyd – rhythm guitar, lead guitar, piano, keyboards, backing vocals, drum tech
- Keith Barney – lead guitar, rhythm guitar, piano, keyboards, backing vocals
- Mick Morris – bass, backing vocals
- Trevor Friedrich – drums, percussion

Production

- Machine – producer, mixing
- Chris Fasulo – engineering
- Ben Grosse – mixing
- Ted Jensen – mastering
- P.R. Brown – design, photography
- Vinny Caruso – A&R
- Pete Giberga – A&R

Additional musicians

- Machine – additional backing vocals
- Brandon Saller – additional backing vocals
- Clinton Bradley – keyboards, programming, sound design
