= Venom & Tears =

Studio album by Throwdown
- Released: August 7, 2007
- Recorded: April–May 2007
- Genre: Groove metal
- Length: 61:14
- Label: Trustkill
- Producer: Mudrock

Throwdown chronology
Vendetta (2005)	Venom & Tears (2007)	Deathless (2009)

Singles from Venom & Tears
- 1. "Holy Roller" Released: December 4, 2007

Professional ratings
Review scores
Source	Rating
Punknews.org	3.5/5 stars
Live-metal.net	9.5/10 stars
Lordsofmetal.nl	8.4/10 stars

Venom & Tears is the fifth studio album by American metal band Throwdown, released on August 7, 2007. The album was featured in Best Buy's weekly circular prior to its release. The track "Holy Roller" was released as a single.

The album insert has two holes on the neck of the pictured female in the place of the two fang wounds on the album cover.

== Track listing ==
All lyrics written by Dave Peters and all music composed by Throwdown.

1. "Holy Roller" – 4:48
2. "Day of the Dog" – 5:07
3. "S.C.U.M." – 3:21
4. "Americana" – 4:33
5. "Weight of the World" – 2:46
6. "Cancer" – 2:03 (instrumental)
7. "Hellbent (On War)" – 2:39
8. "No Love" – 4:31
9. "Venom & Tears" – 5:03
10. "I'll Never Die a Poisoned Death" – 4:29
11. "I, Suicide" – 3:37
12. "Godspeed" – 5:58
13. "Propaganda" – 3:35 (Sepultura cover)
- Track 13 is only available on the Japanese, European, Australian, New Zealand and iTunes editions.

== Track appearances ==
- "Americana" was released with a cover of Crowbar's "Planets Collide" as a digital EP exclusive to iTunes prior to the album's release.
- "I, Suicide" appears on the soundtrack to the film Resident Evil: Extinction.

== Personnel ==
- Dave Peters – vocals
- Mark Choiniere – guitar
- Matt Mentley – bass
- Ben Dussault – drums
- Ryan Clark – design
- Al Fujisaki – engineer, mixing
- Josh Grabelle – A&R
- Jeff Gros – photography
- Jim Miner – tattoo art
- Dave Schultz – mastering
