= Up from the Ashes (Burn Halo album) =

Studio album by Burn Halo
- Released: June 28, 2011
- Genre: Hard rock, alternative metal, post-grunge
- Length: 49:51
- Label: Rawkhead
- Producer: Colby Wedgeworth

Burn Halo chronology
| Burn Halo (2009) | Up from the Ashes (2011) |

Singles from Up from the Ashes
- 1. "Tear It Down" Released: April 19, 2011

Up from the Ashes is the second album by American hard rock band Burn Halo, released on June 28, 2011, through Rawkhead Records.

Frontman James Hart has commented that this is the band's first effort written and recorded as a band, as the band's previous album was all written by Hart himself with outside writers, and recorded by Hart with session musicians.

The first single, "Tear It Down" was released on iTunes on April 19, 2011. On June 16, 2011, the band streamed "Dakota", another new song from the upcoming album, on Revolver Magazine's website, as well as on their Facebook page. On July 7, 2011, the music video for "Tear It Down" made its debut.

== Track listing ==
| No. | Title | Writer(s) | Length |
|---|---|---|---|
| 1. | "Tear It Down" | James Hart, Brandon Lynn, Aaron Boehler | 5:24 |
| 2. | "Up from the Ashes" | Hart, David Bassett | 3:44 |
| 3. | "Stranded" | Hart | 3:30 |
| 4. | "Threw It All Away" | Hart, Joey Roxx | 4:52 |
| 5. | "Alone" | Hart, Lynn, Boehler, Roxx | 3:38 |
| 6. | "Stuck in a Rut" | Hart, Roxx | 4:09 |
| 7. | "Give Me a Sign" | Hart, Lynn | 3:45 |
| 8. | "Dakota" | Hart, Lynn, Boehler | 4:38 |
| 9. | "Rest My Soul" | Hart, Roxx | 3:36 |
| 10. | "I Won't Back Down" | Hart, Roxx, Boehler | 4:53 |
| 11. | "Shine" | Hart, Lynn, Boehler | 4:07 |
| 12. | "We Won't Live Forever" (Bonus Track) | Hart, Lynn, Boehler | 3:35 |
| 13. | "Get It On" (Itunes Bonus Track) | Hart, Lynn, Boehler | 3:48 |
| 14. | "Tear It Down (Radio Edit)" (Deluxe Edition Bonus Track) | Hart, Lynn, Boehler | 3:54 |

== Personnel ==
- James Hart – lead vocals
- Joey Roxx – lead guitar
- Brandon Lynn – rhythm guitar
- Aaron Boehler – bass
- Dillon Ray – drums, percussion
