= Vendetta (Throwdown album) =

Studio album by Throwdown
- Released: June 28, 2005
- Recorded: February 7 – March 5, 2005
- Genre: Metalcore
- Length: 39:32
- Label: Trustkill
- Producer: Zeuss

Throwdown chronology
Haymaker (2003)	Vendetta (2005)	Venom and Tears (2007)

Professional ratings
Review scores
Source	Rating
AllMusic	4/5 stars
Blabbermouth	7.5/10 stars

Vendetta is the fourth album by American band Throwdown. This album marks the group's initial shift from hardcore punk to metal. "Burn" was the album's lead single.

== Track listing ==
All lyrics written by Dave Peters, all music composed by Throwdown.

1. "We Will Rise" – 3:24
2. "Speak the Truth" – 3:16
3. "Vendetta" – 2:50
4. "Burn" – 3:10
5. "Discipline" – 3:20
6. "To Live Is to Sacrifice" – 3:48
7. "Give My Life" – 4:07
8. "The World Behind" (featuring Howard Jones of Killswitch Engage) – 4:03
9. "Shut You Down" (featuring Sean Martin of Hatebreed) – 3:56
10. "Annihilation (N.W.D.)" – 5:47
11. "This Is Where It Ends" – 1:45

== Personnel ==
- Dave Peters – vocals, co-production
- Matt Mentley – guitars
- Ben Dussault – drums
- Dom Macaluso – bass, co-production
- Alan Douches – mastering
- Rob Gil – digital editing
- Zeuss – producer, mixing, engineering
- Jeff Gros – photography
- Ryan J. Downey – manager
