= 1996 (Eighteen Visions album) =

Studio album by Eighteen Visions
- Released: July 9, 2021
- Genre: Metalcore; hard rock
- Length: 40:30
- Label: Independent
- Producer: Keith Barney

Eighteen Visions chronology
XVIII (2017)	1996 (2021)

Singles from 1996
- 1. "Them Bones" Released: June 18, 2021; 2. "D.T.O." Released: June 25, 2021; 3. "1996" Released: July 2, 2021

1996 is the eighth studio album by Eighteen Visions. It is a covers album surprise-released on July 9, 2021, and the band's first album in four years following XVIII (2017). According to frontman James Hart, the album is a "collection of 90s hardcore and hard rock songs from bands that helped shape Eighteen Visions and our style".

== Track listing ==
No.	Title	Original artist (year)	Length
1.	"1996"		3:25
2.	"D.T.O."	Vision of Disorder (1996)	4:10
3.	"The Hangedman"	Damnation A.D. (1995)	6:47
4.	"Born from Pain"	Earth Crisis (1995)	3:25
5.	"Blanket"	Unbroken (1994)	2:39
6.	"Them Bones"	Alice in Chains (1992)	2:42
7.	"Scentless Apprentice"	Nirvana (1993)	4:00
8.	"Sad but True"	Metallica (1991)	5:25
9.	"Terrible Lie"	Nine Inch Nails (1989)	4:05
10.	"Down"	Stone Temple Pilots (1999)	3:52
Total length:			40:30

== Personnel ==
- James Hart – lead vocals, lyrics on "1996"
- Keith Barney – guitars, piano, keyboards, backing vocals
- Josh James – guitars, bass, backing vocals
- Trevor Friedrich – drums, percussion
