= Burn Halo =

American rock band

- Origin: Orange County, California / Tulsa, Oklahoma, U.S.
- Genres: Hard rock; alternative metal; post-grunge
- Years active: 2007–present
- Labels: Epochal/Caroline/Universal; Rawkhead; Warner; eOne
- Members: TJ Chopelas; Joey Roxx; Ryan Frost; John Duarte; Travis Presley
- Past members: Aaron Boehler; Ryan Folden; Allen Wheeler; Brandon Lynn; Timmy Russell; Dillon Ray; Sonny Tremblay; Chris Paterson; James Hart

Burn Halo is an American hard rock band originating from Orange County, California and Tulsa, Oklahoma. It was formed by James Hart, lead singer of Orange County metalcore band Eighteen Visions although he left in 2016 and rejoined Eighteen Visions in 2017.

== History ==
=== Formation and self-titled debut album (2007–2010) ===
James Hart spent nearly a decade recording and touring as the frontman of Orange County band Eighteen Visions. After their breakup in early 2007, He landed a label deal with Island/Def Jam and began working almost immediately with songwriter Zac Maloy on what would become Burn Halo's self-titled debut.

Between May and October 2007, Hart made week-long treks to Tulsa, Oklahoma to write and demo with Maloy. "I knew that I wanted a clear-cut rock 'n' roll band, which is something I had not had in the past", Hart says of the music. "My vision and my brand of rock 'n' roll without having to compromise on any of the songs or any of the material. I wanted to make a very straightforward rock album. Something that had commercial appeal, but also something that had a classic, vintage mid-'80s throwback vibe to it."

Hart recorded the album between October and November 2007 with Maloy as producer, laying down the tracks with studio musicians, including Nickelback drummer Daniel Adair, former Jane's Addiction bassist Chris Chaney, and guitarist Neal Tiemann who now tours with American Idol winner David Cook. Speaking of Maloy, Hart said: "I really felt like he was able to grasp what I wanted to do and where I wanted to take this. From a producer standpoint I feel like he really knocked it out of the park. As a vocalist he was able to bring a lot out of me instead of having me go through the motions and just get the part right. Emoting a little more than I have in the past. He was really able to pull a lot of character out of my voice."

Two singles were released from the album: "Save Me", which Hart described as the heaviest track on the record, and "Dirty Little Girl", which features Avenged Sevenfold guitarist Synyster Gates. Other tracks include "Here With Me", an emotive throwback ballad. "I wanted to touch more on real life situations and real life stories", Hart says. "I wanted to paint a real life picture. I started listening to country and a lot of those songs are very real and down to earth. They are songs about real life, about situations you would come across with a lover or the loss of a friend or heading down a dark path in life. I wanted it to be really simple and easy to digest. I wanted there to be no question about what I was singing about."

After the album was completed, in early 2008, Island elected not to release Burn Halo's debut, leaving Hart with the tough job of finding a new home for his project. Nothing felt quite right, though, so Burn Halo's manager Bret Bair formed his own label Rawkhead Rekords through Warner Music Group to release the record. Hart spent much of 2008 finalizing the lineup of his touring band, with Aaron Boehler on bass, Joey Cunha (formerly of Die Trying) on lead guitar, Allen Wheeler on rhythm guitar, and Ryan Folden on drums. Drummer Timmy Russell joined the band in March 2009, and soon after that Brandon Lynn on rhythm guitar.

The self-titled album was finally released on March 31, 2009, and the band went on tour in support of the album, going on tour with many high-profile bands all around the US. Starting with a supporting slot on Escape the Fate's tour of February–March 2009, then supporting Avenged Sevenfold with Papa Roach and Buckcherry through the rest of March, and in April–May 2009, a slot playing on the SnowCore tour with Static-X and Saliva. In June–July 2009, the band on their first ever headlining tour of the US with supporting bands New Medicine and Track Fighter.

Touring continued through 2010, with a tour supporting Puddle of Mudd with The Veer Union in April 2010, and a tour supporting Tantric and Adema, through July–September 2010.

=== Up from the Ashes (2010–2013) ===
In late 2010, the Burn Halo confirmed that they were going into the studio to record a follow-up to their self-titled debut album, with a hopeful release before summer of 2011. On October 4, 2010, the band went on to say, "Next album will be even more rockin' than the first. Heavier, faster, more metal and more in your face".

On March 30, 2011, Burn Halo streamed the new song "Tear It Down" on Noisecreep, and confirmed the name of the new album, as being on Up from the Ashes. On April 14, 2011, the band stated on Facebook that a music video for the first single "Tear It Down" would be released soon. "Tear It Down" was released as an official single on iTunes on April 19, 2011. On June 16, 2011, the band streamed "Dakota", another new song from the upcoming album, on Revolver Magazine's website, as well as on their Facebook page.

On January 1, 2012, frontman James Hart announced that due to some unforeseen circumstances, personal decisions, Brandon Lynn, Aaron Boehler, and Dillon Ray had left the band. Hart would continue touring with the other remaining member Joey Roxx, along with some new touring members that may become part of the permanent line-up of the band.

On January 2, 2012, it was announced that Sonny Tremblay would be the touring, and possibly become the permanent drummer for Burn Halo.

On January 3, 2012, the band announced that the new bass player was to be Ryan Frost, and the new Rhythm guitar player was to be Chris Paterson.

On February 14 In an interview with Hails and Horns Magazine, James answered questions regarding the lineup change, management frustrations, and the next Burn Halo album, stating:

"Before this last album had been released, our management had made some decisions for the band that we did not agree with. Those decisions turned out to be game changers for the band and this album, and not in a good way. Our touring, promotion and marketing was not half as strong as it was on the first album. It's like no one wanted to work for us. Things got tough on the road and 3 of our members decided to take on their personal lives at home and leave the touring behind ... Let's just say that the current lineup consists of just myself and Roxx. The other guys need to prove themselves before they are listed as members ... I've put my head down and decided to move forward. We've started writing some new stuff in preparations for a new Burn Halo album."

In February 2013, James, Joey, & Ryan began writing sessions for the band's third album. On August 5, pre-production on the third Burn Halo album officially began. In an interview with The Vinnie Langdon Show at the 2013 Aftershock Festival, Joey Roxx provided an update on the band's new album saying that it, should be released in January and that a new single could possibly be released around October or November. Joey also went on to say that they were working with producer Fred Archambault, who had previously worked with Eighteen Visions and Avenged Sevenfold.

=== Wolves of War (2014–present) ===
On January 1, 2014, the band released "Wolves of War", from their new and upcoming album. The song was available for free on their Facebook page and also released on Burn Halo's SoundCloud page later that day. On May 13, a new song called "Fuck You" was played for the first time on KRXQ.net to promote the band's show at Concerts In The Park, which the band also played several new songs at, one being called "Until The End" by the band. On June 1, 2014, the band began filming a new music video for an unknown song. On June 19 the band released the official lyric video for the song Wolves of War on Revolver Magazine's website as well as the name of the new album and a release date of September 23 However, as of September 15 there has been no further information released and no online retailers have placed the album in their system for preordering. On September 23 the band announced that their label Epochal Artist Records had folded and the album would be delayed even further as they look for a new home for the band and the upcoming album, as well as saying a free download of a new song would happen in the coming days. However the free download has yet to be made available.

On March 4, 2015, it was announced via a press release that the band had signed with eOne Music.

On July 17, 2015, the band released their new single, "Dying Without You", via Alternative Press, and also announcing their new album, "Wolves of War", will be released via eOne Music on September 4, 2015. Fred Archambault was brought on board to produce, engineer and mix "Wolves of War". The band released the official music video for the song "Fuck You" on August 3, 2015.

On June 7, 2016, it was announced that James had left the band and was replaced by TJ Chopelas (formerly of Track Fighter).

== Band members ==
Current

- TJ Chopelas – lead vocals (2016–present)
- Joey Roxx – lead guitar (2007–present)
- Ryan Frost – rhythm guitar, backing vocals (2013–present), bass guitar (2012-2013)
- Travis Presley – bass guitar (2015–present)
- John Duarte – drums (2013–present)

Touring and session musicians

- Neal Tiemann – guitars (2007)
- Chris Chaney – bass (2007)
- Daniel Adair – drums (2007)
- Chris Paterson – rhythm guitar, backing vocals (2012)
- Sonny Tremblay – drums (2012)

Former

- James Hart – lead vocals (2007–2016)
- Allen Wheeler – rhythm guitar (2007–2009)
- Brandon Lynn – rhythm guitar (2009–2011)
- Aaron Boehler – bass (2007–2011)
- Ryan Folden – drums (2007–2009)
- Timmy Russell – drums (2009–2010)
- Dillon Ray – drums (2010–2011)
- Chris Bishop – bass (2013–2015)

Timeline

== Discography ==
=== Studio albums ===
Year	Album details	Peak chart positions		
Year	Album details	US	US Heat.	US Ind.
2009	Burn Halo: Released: March 31, 2009; Label: Rawkhead/Warner; Format: CD	129	2	13
2011	Up from the Ashes: Released: June 28, 2011; Label: Rawkhead; Format: CD	—	12	—
2015	Wolves of War: Released: September 4, 2015; Label: eOne Music; Format: CD, digital download	—	—	—

=== Singles ===
Year	Song	Peak chart positions	Album
Year	Song	US Main.	Album
2009	"Dirty Little Girl"	19	Burn Halo
2010	"Save Me"	36	Burn Halo
2011	"Tear It Down"	35	Up from the Ashes
2014	"Wolves of War"	—	Wolves of War
2015	"Dying Without You"	—	Wolves of War
