= Obsession (Eighteen Visions album) =

Studio album by Eighteen Visions
- Released: June 15, 2004
- Recorded: Maple St. Studio in Santa Ana, California
- Genres: Metalcore; alternative metal
- Length: 35:47
- Label: Trustkill Records
- Producers: Andrew Murdock, Scott Gilman, Fred Archambault

Eighteen Visions chronology
Vanity (2002)	Obsession (2004)	Eighteen Visions (2006)

Singles from Obsession
- 1. "Waiting for the Heavens" Released: August 10, 2004; 2. "I Let Go" Released: September 8, 2004; 3. "Tower of Snakes" Released: April 12, 2005

2024 re-recorded cover
- Obsession 2024 re-recorded cover.

Professional ratings
Review scores
Source	Rating
AllMusic	3/5 stars
Exclaim!	Favorable
PopMatters	Unfavorable
Lollipop Magazine	Unfavorable

Obsession is the fifth album by Eighteen Visions. The album was their most commercially successful to date, and featured three music videos.

== Background ==
Following the release of Vanity in August of 2002, guitarist Brandan Schieppati would depart Eighteen Visions to focus on his band Bleeding Through. Eighteen Visions would then tour alongside a number of acts to promote Vanity, including: Every Time I Die, Hopesfall, Norma Jean, Throwdown, Terror, Kittie, Sworn Enemy, and Underoath.

In March 2003, the band announced that they had finished recording ten songs, with the exception of vocals, for an upcoming release. On March 19 the band announced that they would be recording a video for the track "You Broke Like Glass" with Timecode Entertainment, shot on location at Paul Frank Industries.

On October 24, Eighteen Visions announced they were preparing pre-production for their upcoming third release, and that they had enlisted Andrew Murdock to assist with production. In January 2004, the band announced they had completed work on their upcoming full-length, "Obsession." They also shared that drummer Ken Floyd officially moved to guitar, and that former Saved By Grace member Jason Shrout would take his place on drums. Shrout would depart the band in July of 2004, following Obsession's release. In March, the band shared that they were in the process of remixing the album with assistance from Ben Grosse. Upon completion of mixing, the band would be sending the album to Brian Gardner for mastering. They also shared that they had plans to shoot a video for the track "Waiting for the Heavens," which would be directed by Chris Sims and Timecode Entertainment. The video debuted in late May of 2004 via RED Music.

The album was officially released on June 15, 2004, but was re-released later in the year via Epic Records.

Some editions of this album come with a DVD that features a 'making of' the album. The album has sold over 200,000 copies in the US. The album peaked at #4 on the Heatseekers chart in the US. On July 3, 2004, the album peaked at #147 on the Billboard 200. The song "Guilty Pleasures," seemingly only available on the UK Pressing of Obsession, was confirmed by singer James Hart on Twitter to actually be "The Sun Falls Down." The title is incorrect on the Japan pressings and the single for "I Let Go."

The album was noted to be a starkly different sonic approach by comparison to the sound found on their earlier work, noted by AllMusic as "[a] shadowy realm [...] where the iron poles of heavy metal beat against hardcore spines, and hammer the resulting screams into melodies lanced with pain."

In January 2005, the band shared that they would be recording a music video for the track "I Let Go," the third video from the album. The video would be directed by Zach Merck.

On 15 June, 2024, the 20th anniversary of the album's release, a fully re-recorded version of the album was released with accompanying reworked cover art. While "Said and Done", the closing song of the original record, is the only that does not appear on the 2024 version of the album, previously unreleased demos had been finished and released as new songs "Ghost Like Swayze" and "Monster". Additionally, two bonus tracks from the original record's limited release, "Sun Falls Down" and "The World Is Mine", were also included.

== Track listings ==
=== US pressing ===
1. "Obsession" (2:03)
2. "I Let Go" (3:23)
3. "Crushed" (3:00)
4. "This Time" (3:05)
5. "Tower of Snakes" (3:41)
6. "I Should Tell You" (3:47)
7. "Waiting for the Heavens" (3:43)
8. "Lost in a Dream" (3:07)
9. "Bleed by Yourself" (3:20)
10. "A Long Way Home" (2:34)
11. "Said and Done" (4:00)

=== UK pressing ===
1. "Obsession" (2:03)
2. "I Let Go" (3:23)
3. "Crushed" (3:00)
4. "This Time" (3:05)
5. "Tower of Snakes" (3:38)
6. "I Should Tell You" (3:45)
7. "Waiting for the Heavens" (3:41)
8. "A Pretty Blue (Lost in a Dream)" (3:07)
9. "Guilty Pleasures (The Sun Falls Down)" (3:15)
10. "Bleed by Yourself" (3:18)
11. "The World Is Mine" (2:57)
12. "A Long Way Home" (2:34)
13. "Said and Done" (3:58)

=== Japanese pressing ===
1. "Obsession" (2:03)
2. "I Let Go" (3:23)
3. "Crushed" (3:00)
4. "This Time" (3:05)
5. "Tower of Snakes" (3:38)
6. "I Should Tell You" (3:45)
7. "Waiting for the Heavens" (3:41)
8. "Lost in a Dream" (3:07)
9. "Bleed by Yourself" (3:18)
10. "A Long Way Home" (2:34)
11. "Said and Done" (3:58)
12. "The World Is Mine" (2:57)
13. "Guilty Pleasures (The Sun Falls Down)" (3:15)

=== 2024 re-recording ===
1. "Obsession" (2:29)
2. "I Let Go" (3:18)
3. "Crushed" (3:18)
4. "This Time" (3:11)
5. "Tower of Snakes" (4:10)
6. "I Should Tell You" (3:38)
7. "Waiting for the Heavens" (3:54)
8. "Lost in a Dream" (3:06)
9. "Bleed by Yourself" (3:15)
10. "A Long Way Home" (2:32)
11. "Ghost Like Swayze" (3:11)
12. "Monster" (3:05)
13. "Sun Falls Down" (3:16)
14. "The World Is Mine" (2:55)

== Personnel ==
- James Hart – lead vocals
- Keith Barney – guitars, piano, lap steel, vocals
- Mick Morris – bass
- Ken Floyd – drums, percussion, keyboard, programming, guitars, vocals

Production

- Andrew Murdock – producer, engineering
- Fred Archambault – producer, engineering
- Scott Gliman – producer, engineering
- Ben Grosse – mixing
- Brian Gardner – mastering
- Mark Wess – photography
