= Clear (hardcore band) =

American hardcore band (1995–2000)

- Origin: Salt Lake City, Utah, United States
- Genres: Metalcore
- Years active: 1995–2000
- Labels: Life Sentence; Stillborn
- Past members: See "Members"

Clear (stylized as xClearx) was a straight edge metalcore group from Utah in the mid-late 1990s, known for its sound similar to Culture and Morning Again. The band broke up in 2000. Mick Morris went on to Eighteen Visions, and other members Jason Knott, Levi Lebo, and Josh Asher to The Kill. Levi and Mick previously also played in Decontaminate. Sean and Tyler went on to form Hammergun. xclearx played one reunion show on February 16, 2007. In 2013 Mick Morris died prompting Clear to do a memorial show for his son. Clear played a benefit show a couple years later. Currently 2017 Jason Knott is a singer/guitarist for Motherkilljoy, Levi Lebo plays guitar for Exes, Tyler Smith drums for Eagle Twin. Other bands associated with the dis-banning of Clear are The New Transit Direction, Form of Rocket, and Light/Black.

== Members ==
Final lineup

- Jason Knott - Vocals
- Mick Morris - Guitar (died 2013)
- Josh Asher - Guitar
- Sean McClaugherty - Bass
- Tyler Smith - Drums

Previous members

- Dave Anderson - Guitar
- Levi Lebo - Guitar
- Julie Jensen - Guitar
- Jim Dieckman - Guitar

== Discography ==
- The Sickness Must End - Life Sentence Records (1996)
- Deeper Than Blood - Stillborn Records (1999)
