= Burn Halo (album) =

Studio album by Burn Halo
- Released: March 31, 2009
- Recorded: October–November 2007
- Genre: Hard rock, alternative metal, post-grunge
- Length: 46:28
- Label: Rawkhead
- Producer: Zac Maloy

Burn Halo chronology
Burn Halo (2009)	Up from the Ashes (2011)

Singles from Burn Halo
- 1. "Dirty Little Girl" Released: November 25, 2008; 2. "Save Me" Released: January 12, 2010

Professional ratings
Review scores
Source	Rating
The Interlude	2.5/5 stars
ARTISTdirect	3.5/5 stars
Dangerdog Music Reviews	3.5/5 stars
Hard Rock Hideout	8.5/10 stars
Pure Grain Audio	(9.6/10)
TuneLab Music	5.5/10 stars
Type 3 Media	4/10 stars

Burn Halo is the debut album by American rock band Burn Halo. The album was set for release in 2008 through Island Records, but after the album was completed Island elected not to release it. It was released on March 31, 2009, through Rawkhead Rekords. It entered at #129 at the Billboard 200, selling 4,800 copies.

== Track listing ==
No.	Title	Composers	Length
1.	"Dirty Little Girl" (feat. Synyster Gates)	James Hart, Brian Haner, Jr., Zac Maloy	3:48
2.	"Save Me"	Neal Tiemann, Hart, Maloy	4.01
3.	"Here With Me"	Hart, Maloy	4:33
4.	"Too Late To Tell You Now"	Hart, Maloy	3:50
5.	"So Addicted"	Hart, Maloy	3:17
6.	"Dead End Roads & Lost Highways"	Hart, Maloy	3:18
7.	"Saloon Song"	Hart, Maloy	3:43
8.	"Our House"	Hart, Maloy	3:28
9.	"Fallin' Faster"	Dave Buckner, Keith Barney, Hart	3:32
10.	"Anejo" (feat. Synyster Gates)	Hart, Haner, Maloy	3:50
11.	"Back to the Start"	Hart, Maloy	3:41
12.	"Gasoline"	Hart, Maloy	5:25

== Singles ==
=== Dirty Little Girl ===
The album's first single "Dirty Little Girl" was released on November 25, 2008, and features Avenged Sevenfold guitarist Synyster Gates. The song has peaked at #19 on the Billboard Mainstream Rock charts.

The music video for "Dirty Little Girl" premiered on MTV on February 25, 2009. It was filmed on November 19, 2008, at The Slide Bar in Fullerton, California.

=== Save Me ===
"Save Me" was the 2nd single. It was released on radio on January 12, 2010. The song was used in the soundtrack for the WWE videogame WWE SmackDown vs. Raw 2009.

== Chart performance ==
=== Album ===
Year	Chart	Position
2009	US Billboard 200	129
2009	US Heatseekers Albums (Billboard)	2

=== Singles ===
Year	Single	Chart	Position
2009	"Dirty Little Girl"	US Mainstream Rock Tracks	19
2010	"Save Me"	US Mainstream Rock Tracks	39

== Personnel ==
- James Hart – lead vocals
- Neal Tiemann – lead guitar
- Chris Chaney – bass
- Ryan Folden - drums
- Daniel Adair – drums, percussion
- Allen Snake Jones Wheeler – rhythm guitar

Additional musicians

- Synyster Gates – lead guitar/solo on "Dirty Little Girl" and "Anejo"
- Joey Cunha – additional guitar on "So Addicted"
- Brian LeBarton – piano on "Too Late to Tell You Now"
- Keith Barney – strings on "Fallin' Faster"
- Stevie Blacke – strings on "Too Late to Tell You Now" and "Back to the Start"
- Zac Maloy – percussion, additional guitar on "Too Late to Tell You Now" and "Saloon Song", acoustic guitar on "Gasoline", additional vocals on "Dead End Roads & Lost Highways" and "Gasoline"
