= Dave Peters =

American vocalist and guitarist

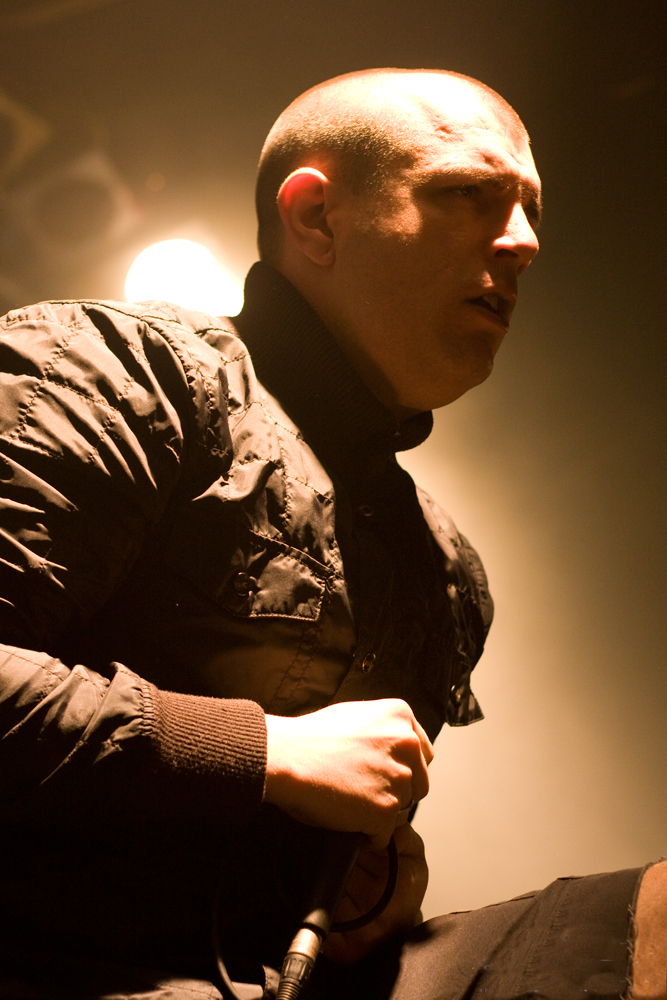
- Peters performing in 2009

Background information
- Birth name: David Peters
- Genres: Metalcore; hardcore punk; groove metal
- Occupations: Musician; songwriter
- Instruments: Vocals; guitar
- Years active: 1995–present
- Member of: Throwdown
- Formerly of: Eighteen Visions; Bleeding Through

David Peters is an American musician. He was the original guitarist for the metal band Eighteen Visions, guitarist for Throwdown, and, since 2002, the vocalist for Throwdown. He has also provided guest vocals for the song "Unleash" by Soulfly, "Feel as Though You Could" by Demon Hunter, and "Despair" by Living Sacrifice. He follows a straight edge lifestyle.

== Discography ==
Eighteen Visions

- Lifeless (1997)

Throwdown

As guitarist

- Drive Me Dead (EP, 2000)
- You Don't Have to Be Blood to Be Family (2001)
- Throwdown / Good Clean Fun (EP, 2001)
- Face the Mirror (EP, 2002)

As vocalist

- Haymaker (2003)
- Vendetta (2005)
- Americana / Planets Collide (EP, 2007)
- Venom & Tears (2007)
- Covered with Venom (EP, 2007)
- Deathless (2009)
- Intolerance (2014)
- Take Cover (EP, 2020)

Guest vocals

- "Unleash" by Soulfly
- "Feel As Though You Could" by Demon Hunter
- "Despair" by Living Sacrifice
- "Cannibal" by Kublai Khan TX
