= Deathless (Throwdown album) =

Studio album by Throwdown
- Released: November 10, 2009
- Genre: Groove metal
- Length: 54:26
- Label: eOne, Nuclear Blast (Europe/UK)
- Producer: Mudrock, Al Fujisaki

Throwdown chronology
| Venom & Tears (2007) | Deathless (2009) | Intolerance (2014) |

Deathless is the sixth studio album by American metal band Throwdown. The album was released on November 10, 2009 in the US through E1 Music, January 22, 2010 through Nuclear Blast Records in Europe, and January 25, 2010 in the UK, also through Nuclear Blast Records. Deathless is the first album by Throwdown released through E1 (formerly Koch Records) and Nuclear Blast since the band switched from Trustkill Records at the end of 2008.

== Reception ==
=== Commercial performance ===
Deathless reached No. 26 on Billboard's Independent Albums chart on November 28, 2009, and stayed on the chart for one week.

=== Critical response ===
Professional ratings
Review scores
| Source | Rating |
|---|---|
| AllMusic | 3/5 stars |
| AllSounds | 8/10 stars |
| Rock Sound | 8/10 stars |
| Metal Storm | 7/10 stars |
| Braingell Radio | 8/10 stars |
| Alternative Press | 2.5/5 stars |
| Blabbermouth | 4/10 stars |

Deathless received mixed to positive reviews from critics. Some critics praised Throwdown for changing the sound from their previous hardcore punk sound, other critics did not like their decision to change their sound to a more groove metal sound. Most critics agreed that Throwdown had moved to a more Pantera-sounding style. Some, however, even likened the band's new sound to groups including Down, Godsmack and Mudvayne.

== Track listing ==
All songs were written by Dave Peters and Mark Choiniere.

1. "The Scythe" – 4:00
2. "This Continuum" – 3:45
3. "Tombs" – 4:05
4. "The Blinding Light" – 6:12
5. "Widowed" – 5:51
6. "Headed South" – 5:20
7. "Serpent Noose" – 4:12
8. "Ouroboros Rising" – 4:24
9. "Skeleton Vanguard" – 4:24
10. "Pyre & Procession" – 4:07
11. "Black Vatican" – 3:22
12. "Burial at Sea" – 5:31

== Personnel ==
Throwdown

- Dave Peters – vocals
- Mark Choiniere – guitars
- Mark Mitchell – bass
- Jarrod Alexander – drums

Production and art

- Mudrock – producer
- Al Fujisaki – producer, digital editing
- Chris "Zeuss" Harris – mixer
- Alan Douches – mastering
- Ryan Clark – art design
- Jerad Knudson – cover photo
