= Yesterday Is Time Killed =

Yesterday Time Is Killed

Studio album by Eighteen Visions
- Released: March 1999
- Genre: Metalcore; deathcore
- Length: 49:02
- Label: Cedargate
- Producer: Jeff Forrest

Eighteen Visions chronology
Lifeless (1997)	Yesterday Time Is Killed (1999)	No Time for Love (1999)

Yesterday Is Time Killed is the debut studio album by Eighteen Visions. It was released in March 1999 through Huntington Beach, California-based record label Cedargate Records.

Five songs were later re-recorded for the band's third album, The Best of Eighteen Visions. The last untitled song is actually split into 8 tracks, for each "part" of the song.

== Track listing ==
No.	Title	Length
1.	"The Psychotic Thought that Satan Gave Jesus"	4:09
2.	"Raping.Laughing.Tasting.Temptation"	4:30
3.	"Dead Rose"	5:10
4.	"Untitled"	0:09
5.	"The Art of Lust"	3:54
6.	"An Old Wyoming Song"	4:03
7.	"Whore for the Sacred"	5:26
8.	"Death with a Kiss"	6:04
9.	"Overdose"	5:05
10.	"Five 'O Six A.M. Three/Fifteen"	4:46
11.	"Untitled"	0:30
12.	"Untitled"	0:24
13.	"Untitled"	0:30
14.	"Untitled"	0:27
15.	"Untitled"	0:29
16.	"Untitled"	1:02
17.	"Untitled"	1:17
18.	"Untitled"	2:02

== Personnel ==
Eighteen Visions

- James Hart – vocals, layout
- Brandan Schieppati – guitar
- Javier Van Huss – bass
- Ken Floyd – drums

Additional

- Produced by Jeff Forrest
- Artwork by Troy Peace
- Photography by Greg Young and Jeffrey Morse
- Layout by Paul Miner
