= Throwdown (band) =

American hardcore/metal band

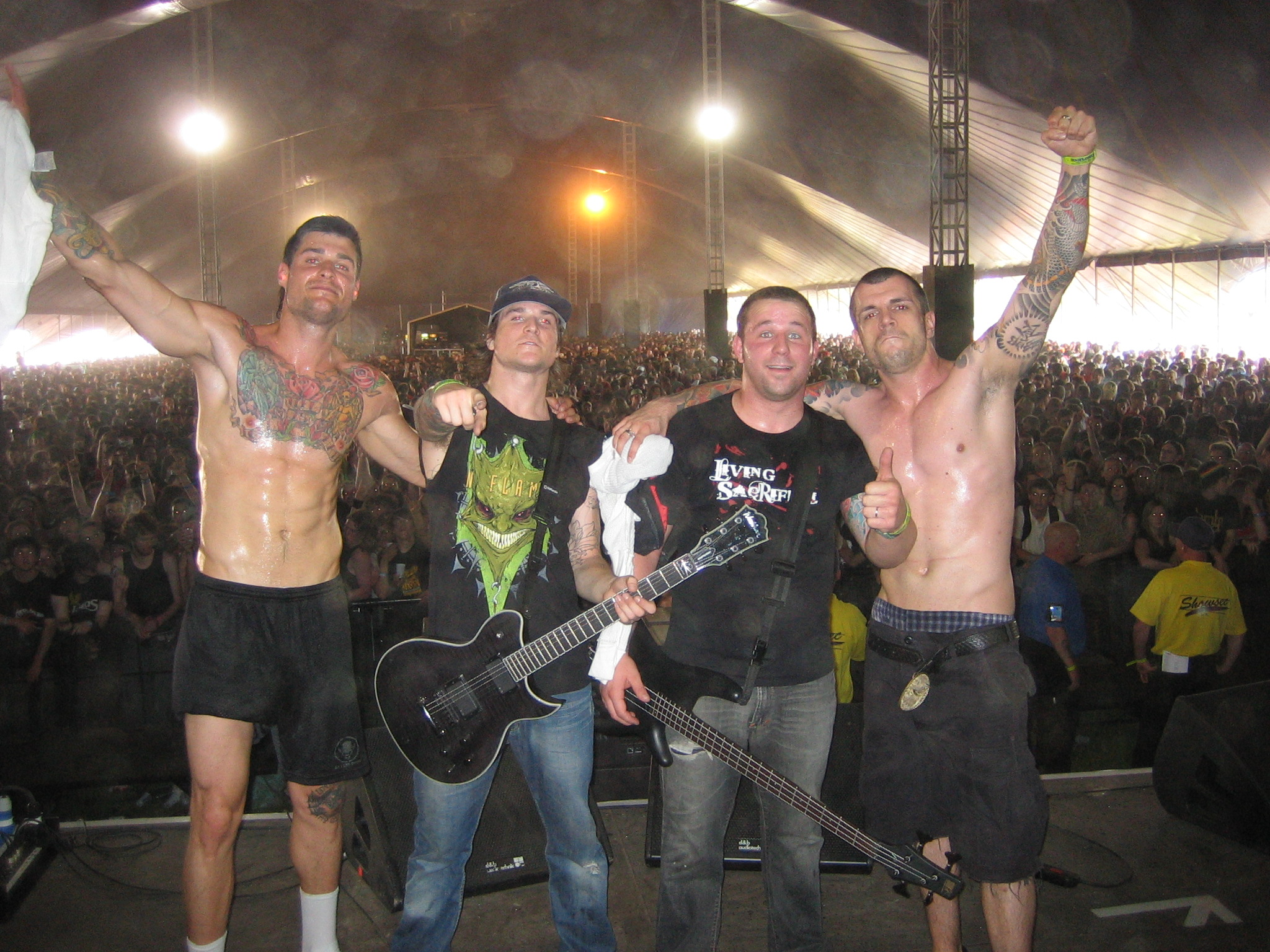
- Throwdown at Download Festival 2006 (Donington Park, UK)

Background information
- Origin: Orange County, California, U.S.
- Genres: Hardcore punk; beatdown hardcore; metalcore; groove metal
- Years active: 1997–present
- Labels: Indecision; Prime Directive; Trustkill; Koch; Nuclear Blast; eOne; Pit Viper
- Spinoffs: Bleeding Through
- Members: Dave Peters; Matt Mentley; Ben Dussault; Mark Choiniere
- Past members: Keith Barney; Tommy Love; Dom Macaluso; Brandan Schieppati; Javier Van Huss; Marc Jackson; Mark Mitchell
- Website: throwdownoc.com

Throwdown is an American hardcore and metal band from Orange County, California. Formed in 1997, the band has endured numerous lineup changes such that no original members remain. Throwdown has toured as part of Ozzfest, Sounds of the Underground, Hellfest, and Warped Tour, as well as with bands such as In Flames, Lamb of God, As I Lay Dying, Killswitch Engage, Korn and Cavalera Conspiracy. The songs "Forever" and "Burn" were staples on MTV2's Headbangers Ball and Revolver Magazine called them part of "The Future of Metal" after hearing the album Vendetta. Initially branded a hardcore punk band, albums like Venom and Tears and Deathless took a sharp turn towards metal, with critics likening the band's sound to that of Pantera and Sepultura. The band members are straight edge.

== History ==
=== Early years (1997–2002) ===
Throwdown was formed in 1997 by vocalist Keith Barney, an active member of both Adamantium and Eighteen Visions, guitarists Tommy Love and Javier Van Huss, bassist Dom Macaluso, and drummer Marc Jackson. The group took on the title Throwdown as a "wry irony on their collective stature", at the time no band member being more than 5 feet 8 inches (1.73 m). The band released their debut, self-titled 7-inch single that same year through Prime Directive Records. Van Huss left the band and was replaced by Brandan Schieppati. After signing a recording contract with Indecision Records, they released their first studio album Beyond Repair the following year. Schieppati was replaced by Dave Peters. The following year, the new line-up released the Drive Me Dead EP.

In 2001, Throwdown was scheduled to release a split 7-inch vinyl with Poison the Well through Surprise Attack Records. Instead, the band released their second studio album, You Don't Have to Be Blood to Be Family. Not long afterward, Jackson left the band, who, lacking a permanent replacement, recruited Barney's 18 Visions bandmate Ken Floyd to fill-in. Floyd appeared on their self-released 2002 EP Face the Mirror. The same year, Barney told the band he'd like to switch from vocals to guitar, as he would often lose his voice on tour, so Peters took over on vocals. Barney would often miss shows due to his commitments to 18 Visions; Matt Mentley was drafted to fill in for him.

=== Haymaker (2003–2004) ===
In 2003, Throwdown recorded and released Haymaker, featuring the Peters-penned straight-edge anthem "Forever", on Trustkill Records. The lineup was Peters on vocals, Macaluso on bass, Love & Barney on guitars, and session drummer Jarred Alexander. A tour with Hatebreed followed in support of the album's release.

As Barney stayed busy with 18 Visions, Macaluso and Love started the band The Lost, who released an EP with Indecision very reminiscent of the group HIM.

Mentley officially replaced Barney in 2004. The band played Japan, with a fill in drummer, and embarked on a short tour of Europe with new drummer Ben Dussault. Former drummer Jackson filled in for Love, on guitar. Peters, Mentley, Dussault, Macaluso, and Love spent the summer of 2004 on Ozzfest's second stage.

=== Vendetta (2005–2006) ===
Throwdown spent the early part of the year recording Vendetta, made at Planet Z Studios with producer Zeuss. Mark Choiniere joined the band shortly before the album was recorded, although he does not appear in the music video for "Burn". Peters, Dussault, Choiniere, Mentley and Macaluso hit the inaugural Sounds of the Underground tour that summer.

In the fall, they headlined a US tour sponsored by To Die for Clothing with Sinai Beach as support. Following this tour, Macaluso, the band's only remaining original member, exited Throwdown. Mentley switched to bass, with Mark Choiniere covering all guitar duties in the live setting. Throwdown has remained a four-piece ever since.

=== Venom & Tears (2007–2008) ===
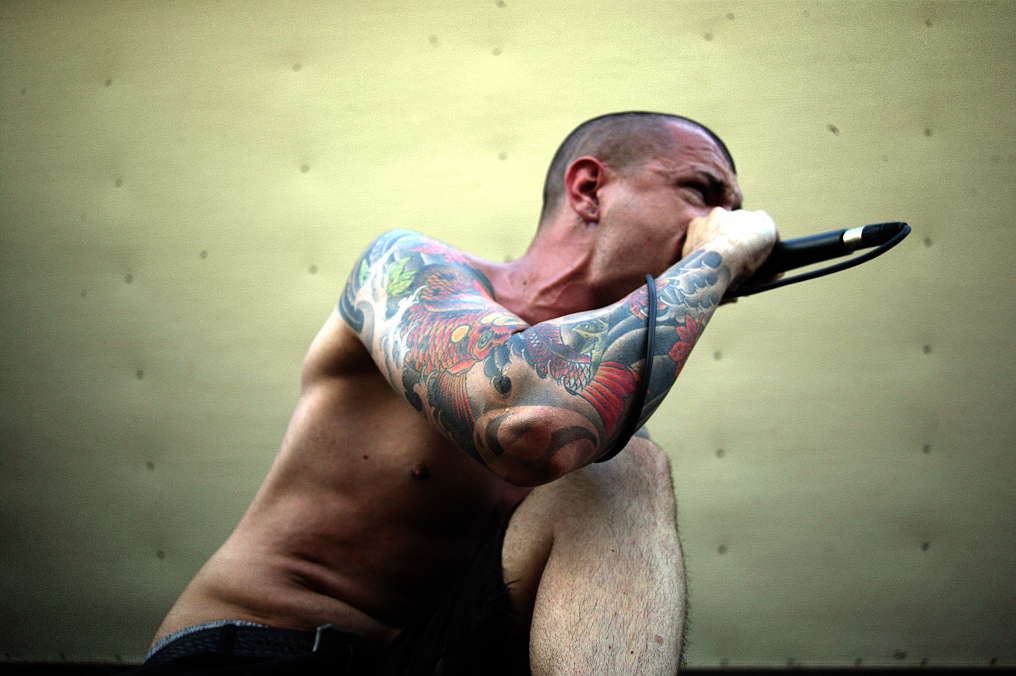
Dave Peters performing at the Warped Tour 2007

Throwdown recorded Venom & Tears with producer Mudrock in Los Angeles.

They spent the summer headlining the Ernie Ball stage on the Vans Warped Tour. After the tour, they filmed a video for "Holy Roller" with director Andy Reale. In the fall, they supported Machine Head on a US tour. Mentley left the band afterward. His replacement, Mark Mitchell, made his live debut in South America in December 2007. Mitchell had previously been the vocalist for the Florida vegan straight edge metalcore band Culture (1993–1994, 1995–1996), and guitarist in Red Roses for a Blue Lady (1998–2001), Until the End (2001–2002) and The Mistake (2004–2007).

In March 2008, Throwdown announced that they had fulfilled their contractual obligations and were no longer signed to Trustkill Records. In December 2008, the band signed to Koch Records and began working on their sixth album. In the same announcement, it was stated that Jarrod Alexander, who worked with the band on Haymaker, would return for the new album.

=== Deathless (2009–2013) ===
In February 2009, the band played at the second annual MusInk festival in Orange County, supporting Danzig and The Used.

In the Spring, Throwdown began recording with Mudrock (who previously recorded Venom & Tears) in Los Angeles. The new album featured Peters, Choiniere, Mitchell, and session drummer Alexander. The album was mixed by Zeuss, who had produced and mixed Vendetta.

They spent September and October touring Europe with Chimaira and Unearth, with Living Sacrifice drummer Lance Garvin behind the kit.

On November 10, 2009, Throwdown released Deathless in North America via Koch (later called eOne Music, and now called MNRK Music Group).

In November and December, they headlined the Deathless Tour across America, with support from Bury Your Dead, For Today, ABACABB, and The World We Knew, again with the lineup of Peters, Choiniere, Mitchell, and Garvin.

In December, the band announced they would join Five Finger Death Punch and Shadows Fall on a lengthy U.S. tour set for January and February 2010. However, without a permanent replacement for Dussault, Choiniere opted to bow out of Throwdown roughly two weeks before the start of the tour. Throwdown dropped out of the tour and was replaced on the bill by the band God Forbid.

Deathless was released in Europe on January 25, 2010, via Nuclear Blast Records.

In October 2011, Throwdown headlined a short West Coast trek dubbed "Brawloween". The lineup was Peters and Mitchell with Demon Hunter drummer Tim "Yogi" Watts and then-Bleeding Through guitarist Dave Nassie filling in. Support for the shows included Carnifex, First Blood, and Suffokate.

=== Intolerance & Take Cover (2014–2022) ===
Throwdown released the Intolerance album on January 21, 2014, via eOne Music. It was produced by Peters with Davey Worsop and mixed/mastered by Zeuss. Peters performed everything on the album, save for drums (handled by longtime session player Alexander) and guitar solos, which were tracked by Nassie.

The band performed at Canada's Amnesia Rockfest in 2014 and Belgium's Groezrock festival in 2015. Both shows featured Peters on vocals and the return of Mentley on bass, with Alexander and Nassie filling in.

In April 2020, Throwdown released a surprise EP, Take Cover, collecting cover songs from over the years. The EP was issued by the band's own label, Pit Viper Records. Throwdown's Trustkill-era albums are now on all digital services via Pit Viper Records, as well.

=== Haymaker XX (2023–Present) ===
Beyond Repair (a new band featuring Barney, Love, and Jackson) performed Indecision-era Throwdown songs at the Indecision Records 30th-anniversary show in July 2023.

In September 2023, Throwdown appeared at Furnace Fest. It was the first Throwdown show with the lineup of Peters, Mentley, Choiniere, and Dussault since 2007. A 20th anniversary edition of Haymaker dubbed Haymaker XX arrived via Pit Viper in late 2023.

Throwdown performed at 2024's Big Texas Metal Fest and New England Metal and Hardcore Festival.

== Members ==
Current

- Dave Peters – lead vocals (2002–present), guitar (1999–2002)
- Matt Mentley – bass (2005–2007, 2014–present), guitar (2004–2005; touring 2001–2004)
- Ben Dussault – drums, percussion (2004–2008, 2023–present)
- Mark Choiniere – guitar (2005–2011, 2023–present)

Touring musicians

- Nick Jett – drums (2003)
- Lance Garvin – drums (2009–2011)
- Timothy "Yogi" Watts – drums (2011)
- Dave Nassie – guitar (2011–2015)

Former

- Tommy Love – guitar (1997–2004)
- Dom Macaluso – bass (1997–2005)
- Keith Barney – lead vocals (1997–2002), guitar (2002–2004)
- Javier Van Huss – guitar (1997–1998)
- Marc Jackson – drums, percussion (1998–2002), guitar (2004)
- Brandan Schieppati – guitar (1998–1999)
- Ken Floyd – drums (2002)
- Jarrod Alexander – drums, percussion (2002-2004, 2008-2009, touring 2014–2015)
- Mark Mitchell – bass (2007–2014)

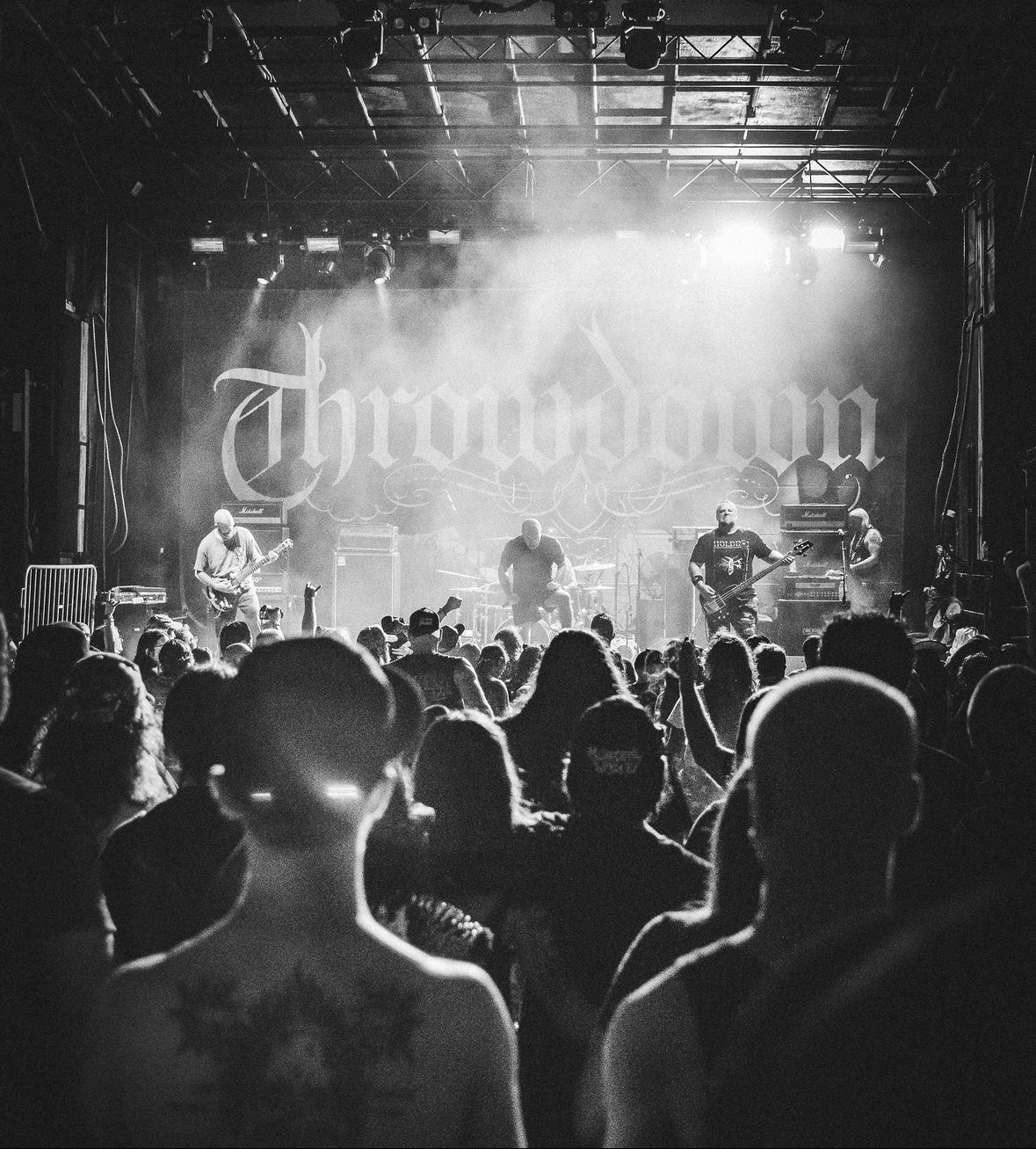
Throwdown at Big Texas Metal Fest 2024 (The Far Out Lounge in Austin, TX)

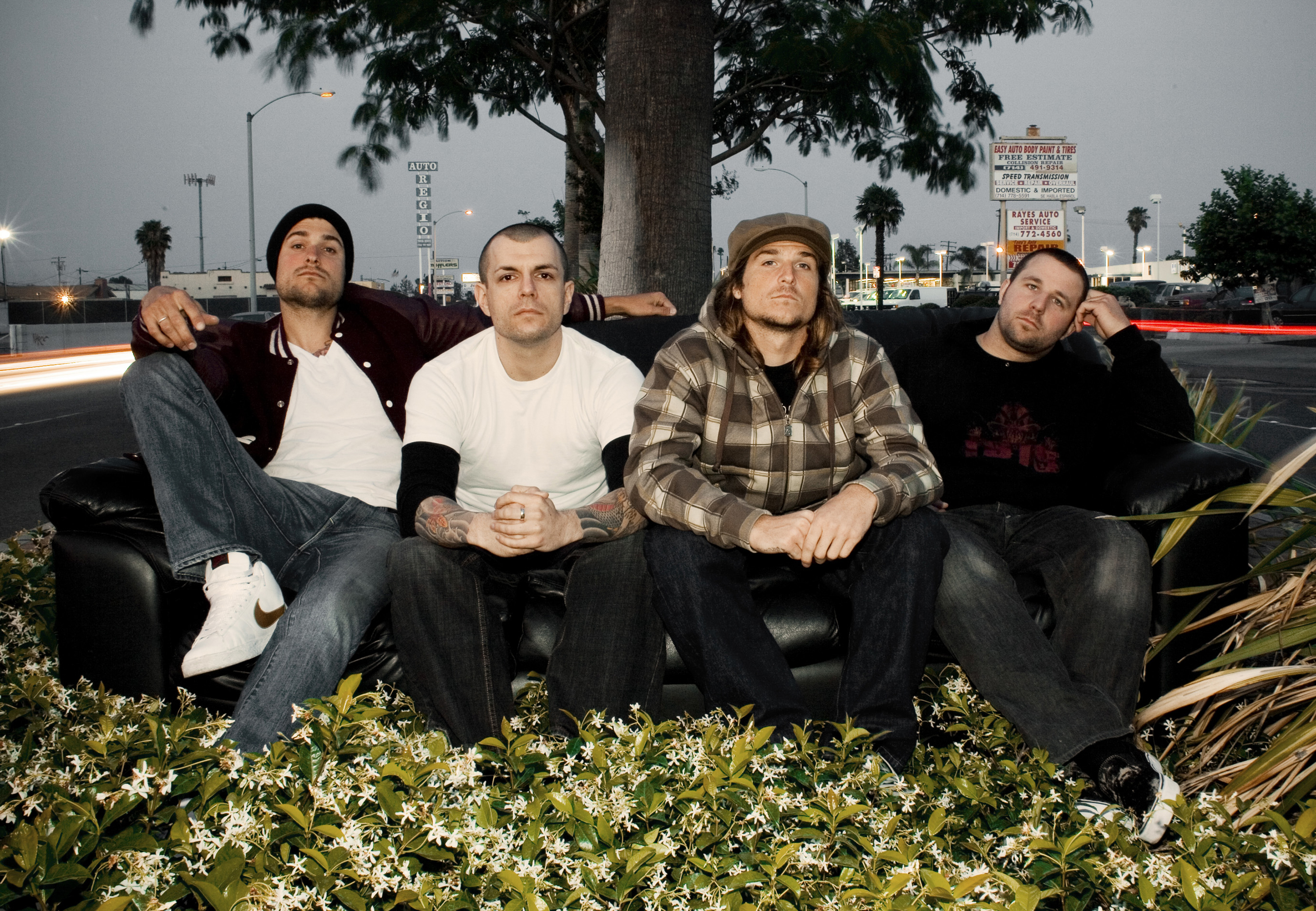
Press shot from V&T era (in the middle of the road across from Chain Reaction)

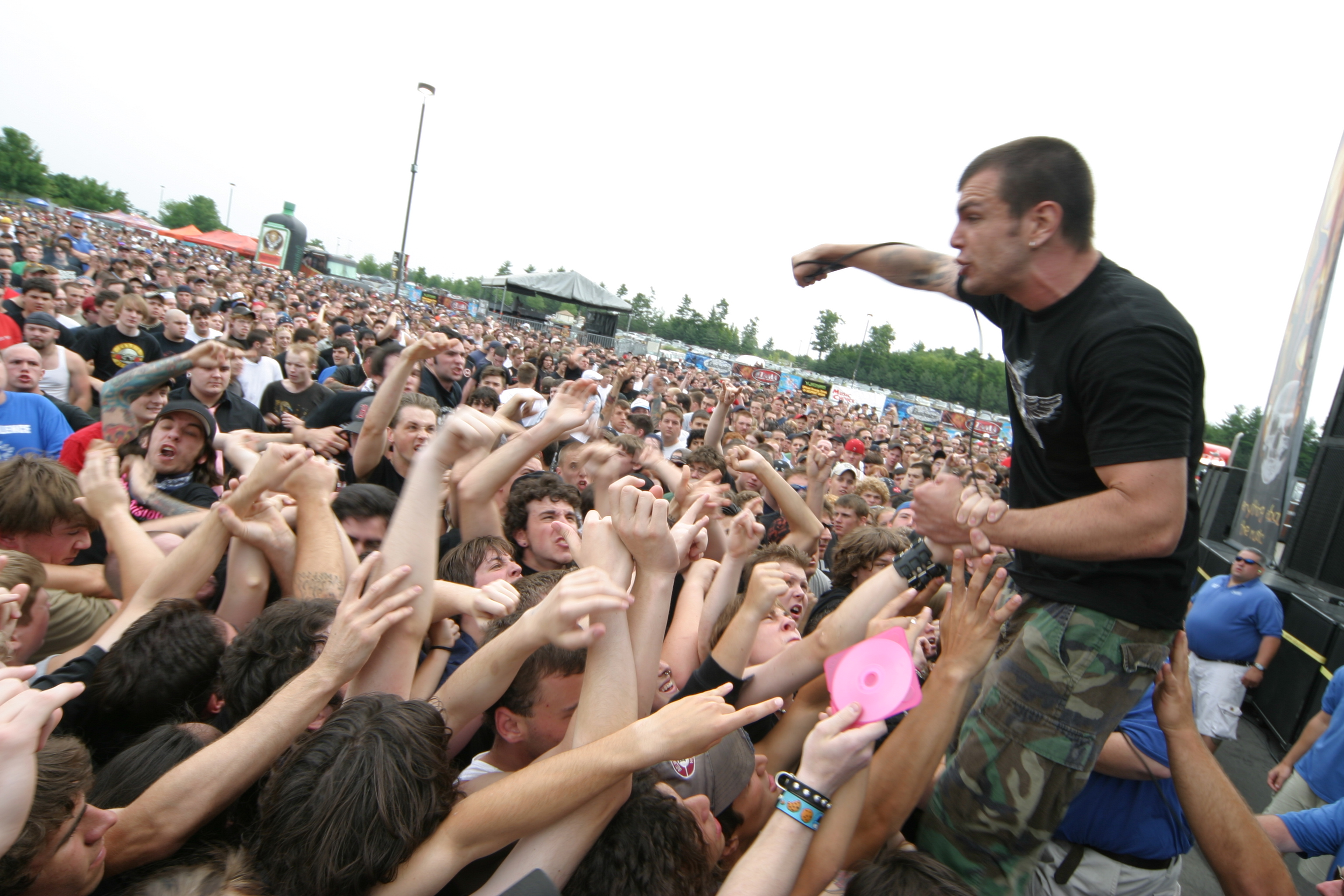
Throwdown Live at Ozzfest 2004

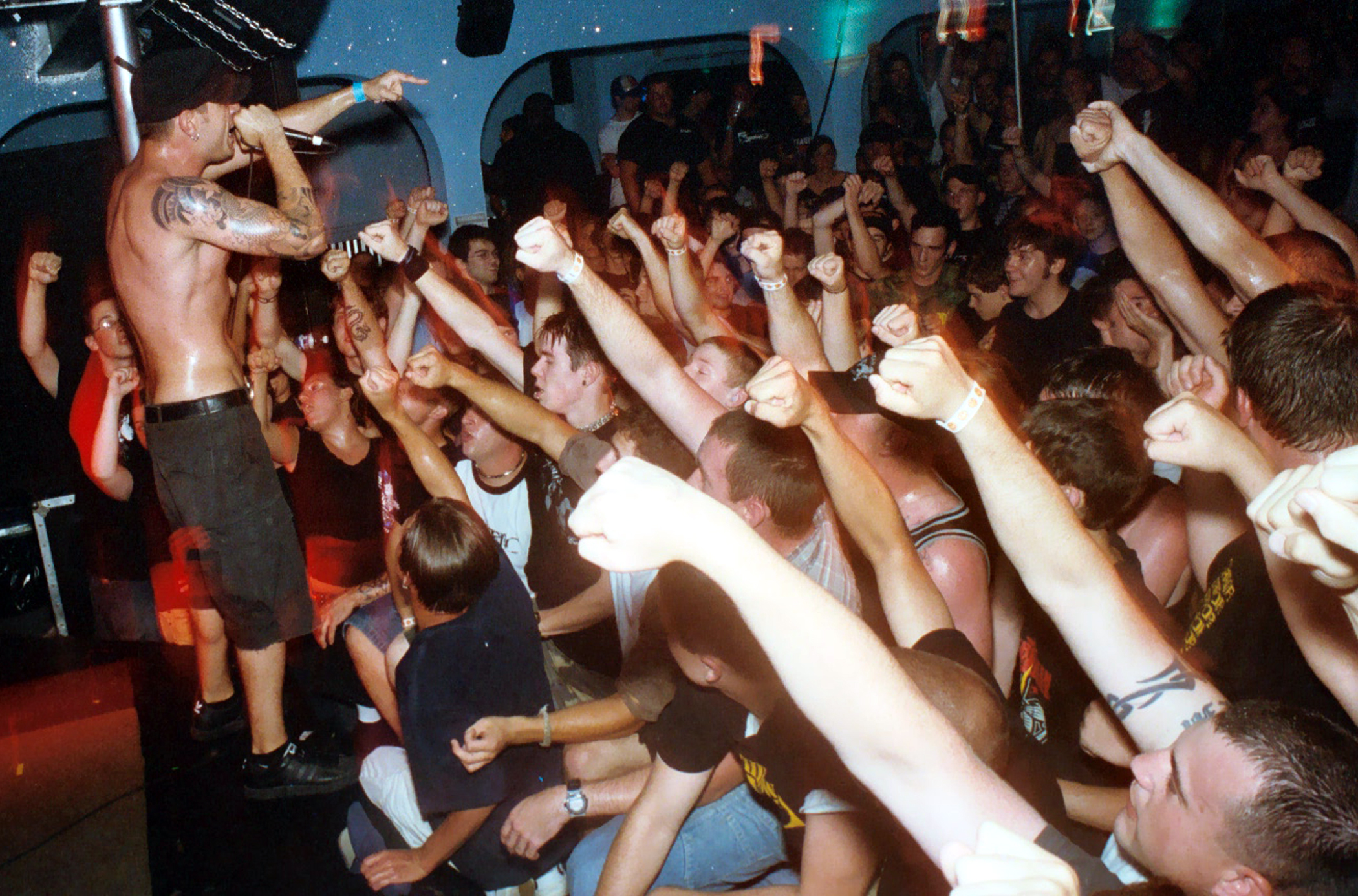
Throwdown Live in Syracuse, NY

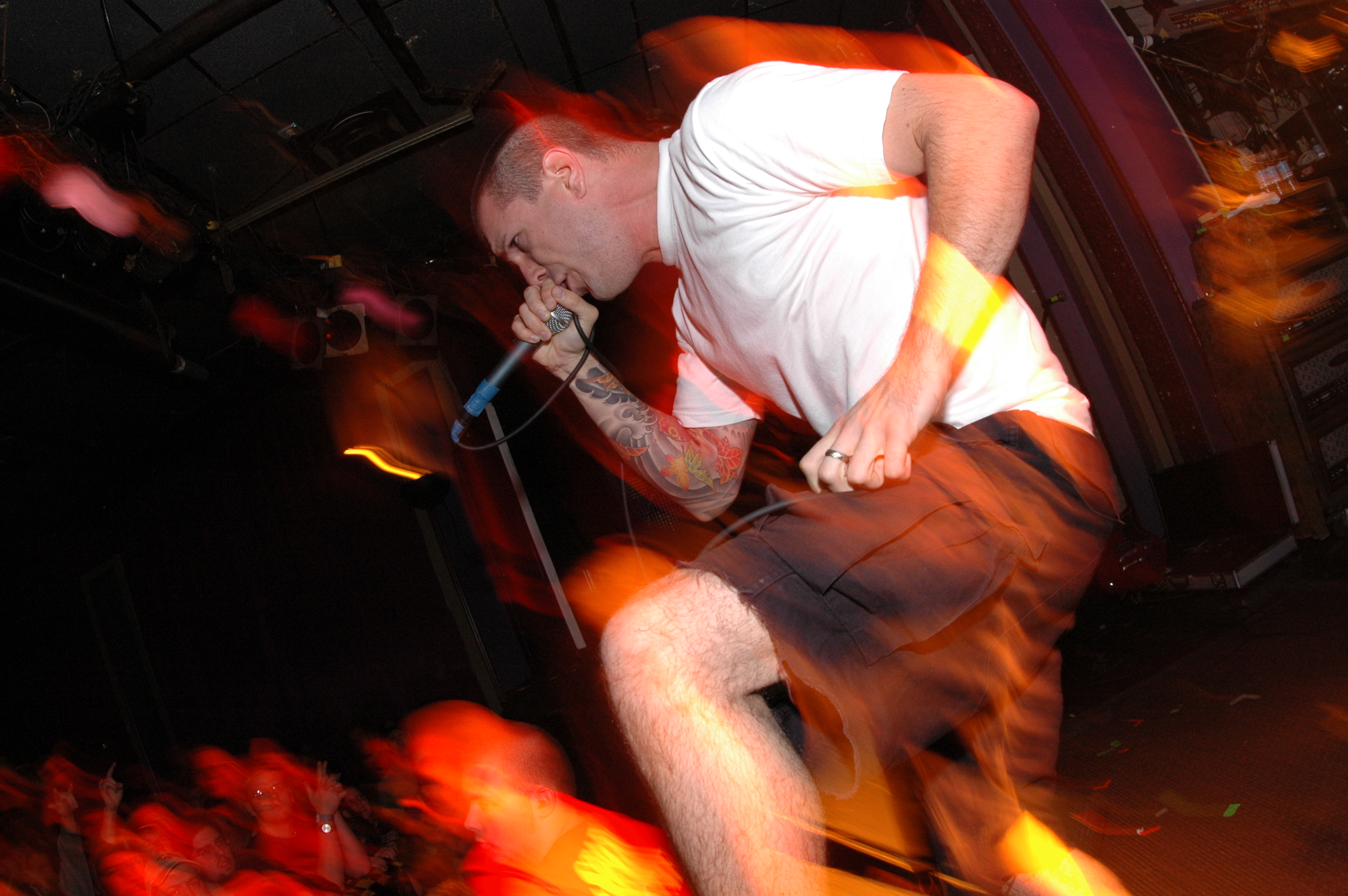
Dave Peters

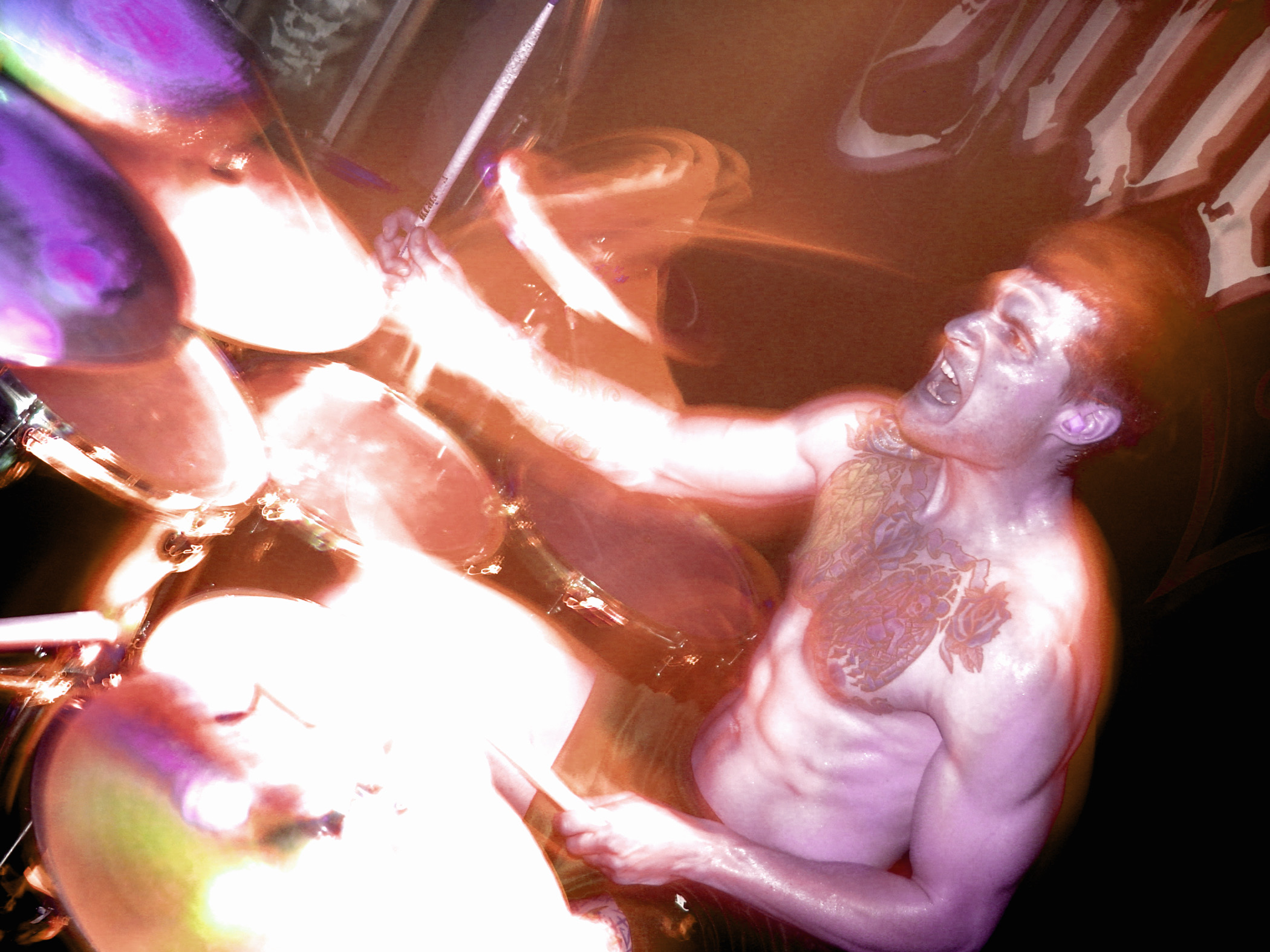
Ben Dussault

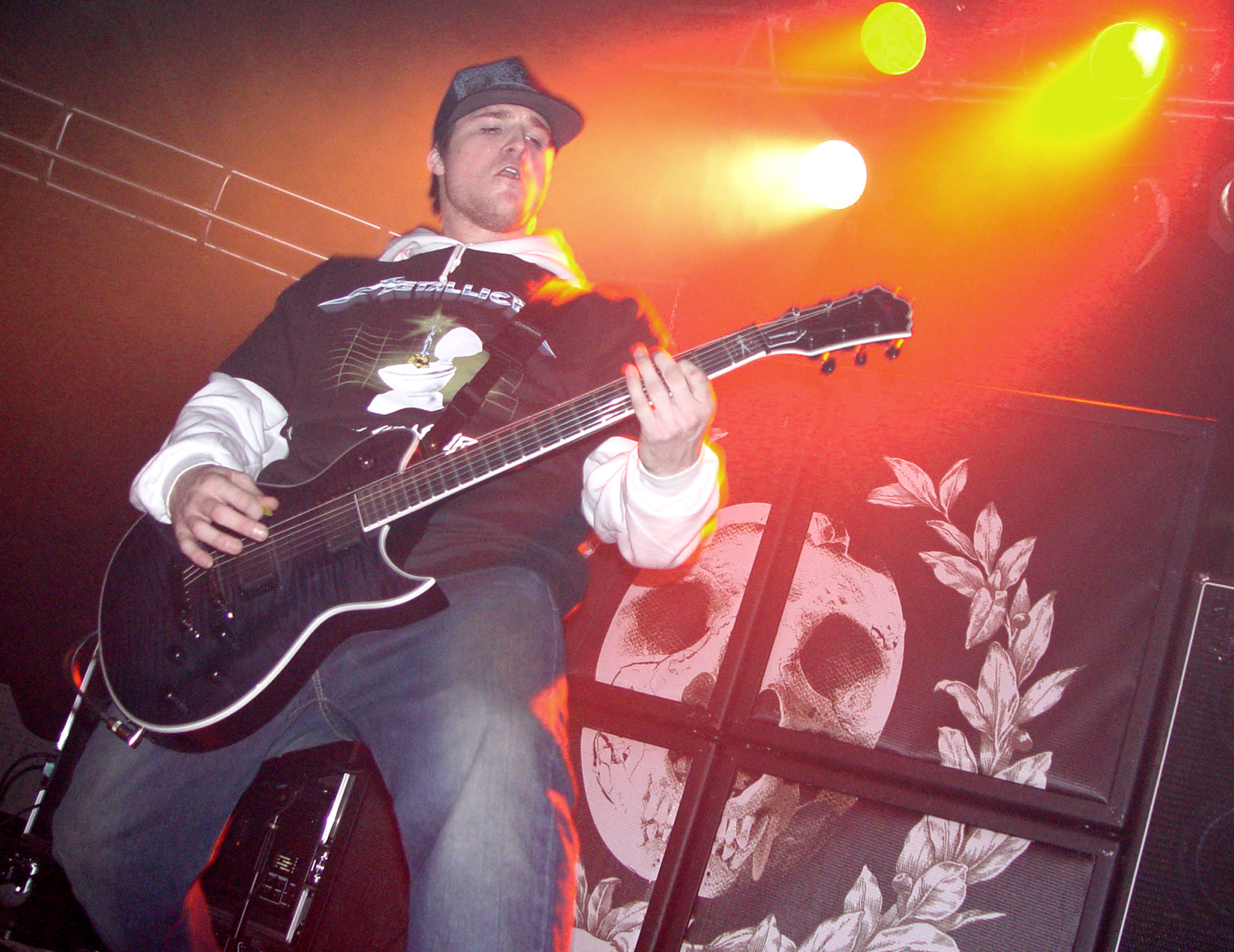
Mark Choiniere

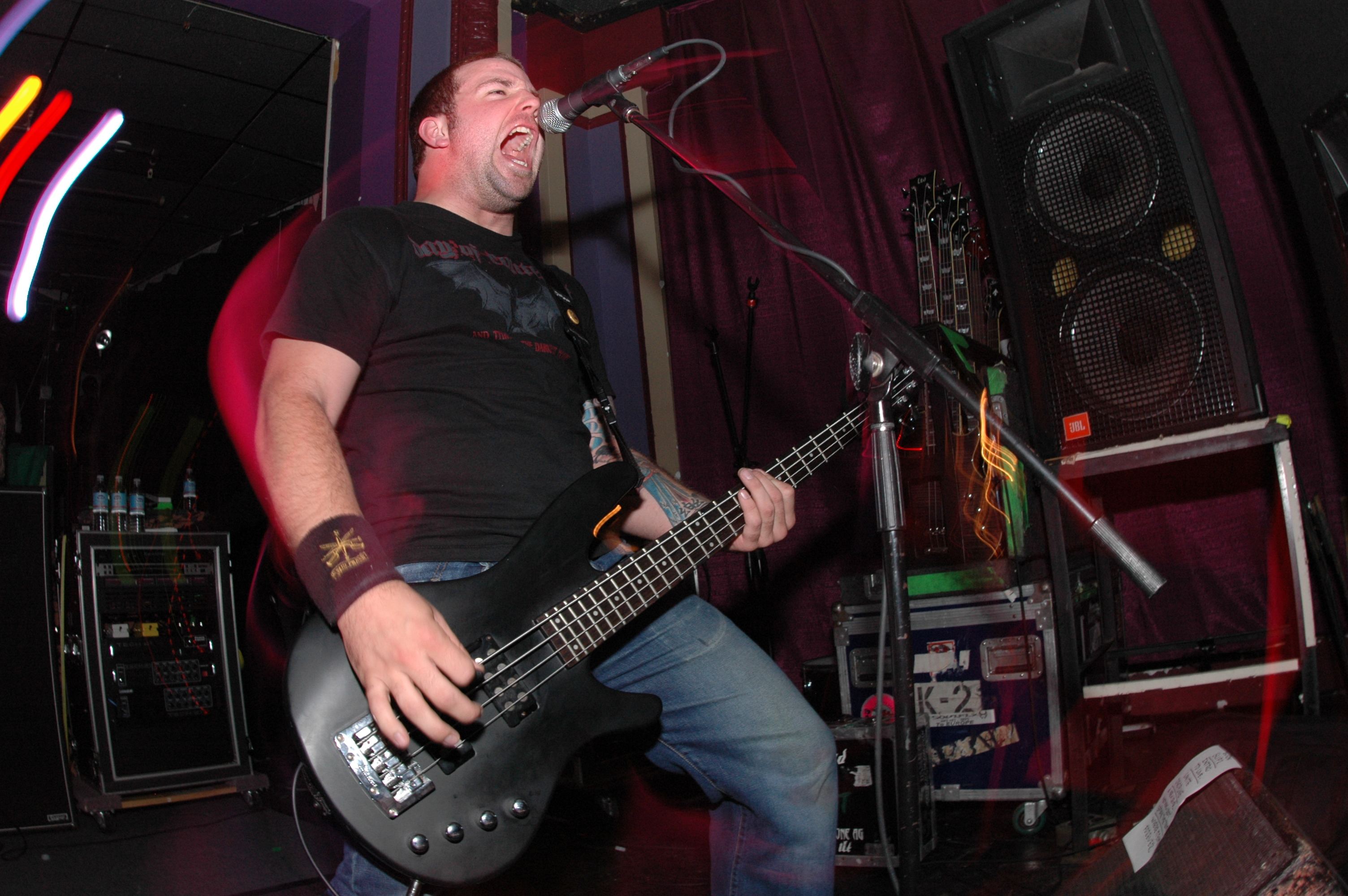
Matt Mentley

Timeline

== Discography ==
=== Studio albums ===
- Beyond Repair (1999)
- You Don't Have to Be Blood to Be Family (2001)
- Haymaker (2003)
- Vendetta (2005)
- Venom & Tears (2007)
- Deathless (2009)
- Intolerance (2014)

=== Extended plays ===
- Throwdown (1998)
- Drive Me Dead (2000)
- Throwdown / Good Clean Fun (2001)
- Face the Mirror (2002)
- Take Cover (2020) (covers EP)

=== DVDs ===
- Together. Forever. United. (2004)

=== Music videos ===
- "Forever" (2004), directed by Chris Sims
- "Burn" (2005), directed by Chris Sims
- "Holy Roller" (2007), directed by Andy Reale
- "The Scythe" (2010), directed by Cale Glendening
- "This Continuum" (2010), directed by Cale Glendening
- "Tombs" (2010), directed by Cale Glendening
- "The Blinding Light" (2010), directed by Cale Glendening
