= Eighteen Visions =

American metalcore band

- Eighteen Visions poster, mid-2000s

Background information
- Origin: Orange County, California, U.S.
- Genres: Metalcore; post-hardcore; alternative metal; hardcore punk
- Years active: 1995–2007; 2017–present
- Labels: Cedargate; Epic; Good Life; Life Sentence; Trustkill; Rise; Sober Mind; Undecided
- Spinoffs: Bleeding Through, Burn Halo
- Members: James Hart; Keith Barney; Josh James; Matt Horwitz; Dan Smith
- Past members: Ken Floyd; Dave Peters; Billy Sisler; Jeff Boullt; Richie Taylor; Javier Van Huss; Brandan Schieppati; Steve Parilla; Tyler Snider; Zachary Phelps; Mick Morris; Jason Shrout; Trevor Friedrich

Eighteen Visions is an American metalcore band from Orange County, California, formed in October 1995. The band broke up in April 2007, less than a year after their major label debut was released through Epic and Trustkill Records. After over a decade of absence, the band reformed in 2017. They announced their sixth album, XVIII, would be released via their new label home at Rise Records.

== History ==
=== Beginnings, Yesterday Is Time Killed and Until the Ink Runs Out (1995–2000) ===
Eighteen Visions was founded in October 1995 by James Hart, Dave Peters, Billy Sisler, and Kenneth Floyd under the name Macabre. The band wrote a bit of material and started to play shows, beginning at the Koo's Cafe in early 1996, in their local area. Soon after, Excessive Force's Jeff Boullt was added to the mix as a second guitarist, and in March, Sisler left the group and was replaced by Richie Taylor. Taylor only lasted a short while, and Javier Van Huss soon took over the bass duties. Later in the year, Boullt also left the band, and Brandan Schieppati was added to complete the group's first stable line-up.

In a 2017 interview, Hart explained that the band got the name Eighteen Visions from a lyric off the song "Slipping Through the Hands of God", though he could not recall the name of the song. The lyric stated "I depict eighteen visions for its demise". Hart explained that the number eighteen came from the number of the beast, as 6+6+6 = 18. Hart elaborated that at the time he was anti-religion and anti-Christianity, and as a 16 year old metalhead, was trying to write the most evil thing he could think of. He stated that the name holds no weight or depth towards the band or any of its members, but was "something that sounded super cool back in 1996."

Their debut release, Lifeless was released on Life Sentence Records in 1997. Shortly after, Peters left the band to focus on playing with Throwdown (which Schieppati also played with), and Steve Parilla replaced him for the EP's tour. The first full-length album, Yesterday Is Time Killed was released by Cedargate Records (the label of Zac Phelps, who was at the time a temporary bassist in the band) in March 1999. The band was brought to the attention Trustkill Records, which was still in its early beginnings. The label released the No Time for Love 7-inch in October 1999. Keith Barney, Schieppati's bandmate in Throwdown, then joined the band to replace Parilla. Ten months after the 7-inch, their second full-length Until the Ink Runs Out was released. It became one of the label's best-selling albums, which led to a lot of the band's earlier material getting bought out and going out of print.

In November 2000, it was announced that Eighteen Visions would be doing a split 7-inch vinyl with Poison the Well for Undecided Records. The split for Undecided Records was to feature a Metallica cover from each of the bands as part of the record label's Crush 'Em All series, which had already seen a split by Shai Hulud and BoySetsFire released as Volume 1 in March 2000. Poison the Well and Eighteen Visions were to be the third release in the series with a tentative release date for the summer of 2001. In January 2001, the Crush 'Em All series switched from 7-inch vinyl to compact discs. Due to complications with Trustkill Records the two bands were unable to recorded their songs and the split was shelved. Javier was asked to leave the band after touring for Until the Ink Runs Out, and was told he would be replaced by Mick Morris of the band xClearx. Javier played two remaining shows with the band and went on to tour for Poison the Well.

=== The Best of and Vanity (2000–2004) ===
For their next album, The Best of Eighteen Visions, the band re-recorded some of their earlier material, some of which was out of print, with the addition of a new song, "Motionless and White". Trustkill and the band felt it would feel much more like a new record, rather than re-releasing the two previous albums on the label. The vinyl version was released in Europe through Sober Mind Records. Despite raw production where mistakes weren't always edited, the album was a vast improvement in production values. This would mark the beginning of the band's tentative approach to more melodic hardcore, rather than their older metalcore approach.

They went on to record Vanity in 2002, which, while still containing heavy breakdowns, metal riffs and odd time signatures, featured better production work, and bits of melodic vocals in nearly all of the songs, complete with hints at balladry with the songs "Gorgeous", an acoustic piece written and performed by then-drummer Ken Floyd, and "Love in Autumn", the album's closer. While the fanbase grew after this release, this was the last album to feature guitarist Brandan Schieppati, who left the band in order to handle full-time vocal duties in metalcore OC band Bleeding Through. Eighteen Visions went on to tour for Vanity as a four-piece. A video was made for "You Broke Like Glass", which played in heavy rotation on MTV2's Headbangers Ball.

=== Obsession (2004–2006) ===
After touring, they went into the studio to record Obsession with producer Mudrock. Material was equally written by Keith Barney and Ken Floyd, who not only played drums, but also played guitar on a fair number of songs. Dramatically changing styles, the album showcased a new sound that was much more accessible to a wider audience, featuring hard rock riffs, but also an arena rock feel to it, with less complex song structures and a much more diverse and melodic range of vocals.

The band then went on a worldwide tour as a supporting act for bands like HIM, Lostprophets and Killswitch Engage, with Ken Floyd switching to second guitar, and Jason Shrout (later replaced by Trevor Friedrich) being added to the band's line-up for all drumming duties. The songs "Waiting for the Heavens", "Tower of Snakes", and "I Let Go" were released as singles on United States and UK pressing and had videos made for them. The album went on to sell a disappointing 200,000 copies, which is twice what the previous record had sold, but was still not enough to break the band into the mainstream.

Obsession went on to be the band's last album for Trustkill Records, after they signed a contract with major label Epic Records for their next effort. Obsession would become Eighteen Visions's most successful album and would give them their new sort of depressive/apathetic image, which would prove hard to be rid of. Around that time, they also recorded a cover of Marilyn Manson’s “The Beautiful People” for the compilation album Punk Goes 90's.

=== Eighteen Visions and mainstream success (2006–2007) ===
Now a solidified five-piece band, Eighteen Visions went into pre-production with producer Machine and 32 demos to work on. On July 18, 2006, they released their self-titled major label debut, which featured slick production, anthemic choruses à la Def Leppard, dark industrial electronic programming and all-melodic vocals reminiscent of the then-current hard rock trend successfully embraced by fellow OC band Avenged Sevenfold. Although a video and a promotional ad campaign had been made for the radio friendly song "Tonightless" (which was a leftover from the previous album writing session), the band decided to scrap it all in order to go with the more hard-rocking "Victim", supposedly against the record label's will. Still, a video was made for "Victim", with little effort from Epic to promote it, even though the song was featured in the WWE Vengeance (2006) pay-per-view event.

Witnessing album sales not taking off and dropping off the Billboard 200 after only one week, the band embarked a variety of tours to promote the record, as a supporting act again. They played opening slots for Avenged Sevenfold, Coheed and Cambria, Hinder, and Bullet for My Valentine, among others.

Even though the catchy power ballad "Broken Hearted" was released to radio stations and managed to get some airplay, no video was made, and the album ended up as a commercial flop. Even though the number of total sales has not been made official, it is widely rumored to have ended below the 100k bar.

=== Break-up (2007) ===
In 2007, while still playing a few shows in Australia and posting daily MySpace bulletins asking fans to request "Broken Hearted" on the radio, band coverage, press and blog updates started decreasing considerably, leading fans to believe the band had been dropped by Epic Records, though no official word on that has been released. This also led to break-up rumors, which were soon confirmed. On April 9, 2007, bassist Mick Morris confirmed the band's breakup on MySpace through this statement:

"After several years of touring and quite a few album releases we have decided that it is time to go our separate ways. We have been a band for a very long time and feel good about everything we were able to accomplish. At this point in our lives and our careers we feel its time to move on to something fresh and new. Whether it be music, touring or just being at home to live and enjoy life. We would like to thank all of our fans, friends and families for all of the great support over the years. We would also like to thank all of the bands we have shared the stage with and everyone who has ever worked with the band, opened a door or reached out a hand. We will be playing our final two shows in April. One in San Diego and one in Orange County. Come rock with us one more time."

While the break-up might have appeared somewhat abrupt, frontman James Hart stated on his MySpace blog that this was not the case on July 13, 2007: "18V had been a band for 10+ years, [...] it just got to the point where we all had different goals and ideas for the band on a musical and touring basis. We all felt it was time to move on to something fresh and new."

=== Post-breakup (2007–2017) ===
Trevor Friedrich was hired by Eleven Seven recording artist Sixx:A.M. for the "Accidents Can Happen" video. He is now the drummer in the band Never Enough with Eighteen Visions' Keith Barney on guitar. He also drums for the industrial acts Imperative Reaction and Combichrist. He is currently the singer of The Witch Was Right. He also formed a band called Monkeys Are Machine Guns. Trevor was also the drummer for Suffer Well with Bleeding Through's Brandan Schieppati on vocals.

Keith Barney also recently joined hardcore band Monument to Thieves. He also joined California hardcore band Love Thyne just before they officially disbanded. He is currently working as a graphic designer.

Ken Floyd is currently working on a new wave band called Hi-Deaf. He was touring guitarist for Saosin in 2010.

Mick Morris joined Hatebreed on tour, doing tech work. He also launched Dethless Clothing, held a popular weekly updated eBay store, and modeled for several clothing lines. Morris stated that he would be willing to have an Eighteen Visions reunion if the other members were willing to. This never came to fruition, however, as Morris died on June 3, 2013, almost four years before the actual reunion he wished for.

Hart has been working with former Nixons frontman Zac Maloy on a project named Burn Halo. Maloy's previous collaborations include songwriting credits for Chris Daughtry and Bowling for Soup, among others. Keith Barney and Avenged Sevenfold lead guitarist Synyster Gates appear to have also contributed to the project, which has evolved from a solo project into a full band. Burn Halo signed to Island Records, but after the album was completed in early 2008, Island elected not to release Burn Halos debut, leaving Hart with the tough job of finding a new home for his project. Burn Halo's manager, Bret Bair, formed his own label through Warner Music Group, Rawkhead Rekords, to release the record. Burn Halo played their first ever live show, opening for Avenged Sevenfold on December 9, 2008, at Ram's Head Live in Baltimore, Maryland. The band released their debut record on March 31, 2009. It also released full-length albums in 2011 and 2015 before amicably parting ways with Hart who allowed the other members to use the band's name and the entire music catalog for live shows.

=== Reunion, XVIII, and other releases (2017–present) ===
On February 9, 2017, an official Instagram account of the band was launched, with James Hart, Keith Barney, and Trevor Friedrich being tagged on the first picture that contained the message "the countdown begins...". All three members uploaded the same picture onto their respective private accounts as well. The band have since shared some footage of them working in the studio, along with a 15-second long clip of a new song. Mick Kenney was chosen by the band to do production, mixing, and mastering of the comeback record.

On April 20, 2017, ten years from the day of the farewell live performance, the band confirmed the details surrounding their new album, XVIII, which would be released on June 2, 2017, via their new label home at Rise Records, and released a full stream and music video for the album's first single, "Oath". On May 9, 2017, "Crucified", the second single off the new record, was released as a lyric video on YouTube. Both songs were under two minutes in length and marked the return of heavy screaming as a prominent element of the band's sound. The band also confirmed that one of the album's tracks, "Live Again", is a tribute to Mick Morris. On May 25, 2017, "The Disease, the Decline, and Wasted Time", the third single off XVIII, was released.

In June 2017, it was revealed that a founding member, guitarist Ken Floyd, could not take part in the reunion due to his full-time job as a tour manager for Zedd. It was also reported that the band decided not to replace the late Mick Morris with any other bass players, primarily out of respect for him. Instead, his bass tracks will be used at live shows for the songs released prior to 2017. Keith Barney, however, ruled out the possibility of an extensive touring in the near future due to full-time jobs that band members have.

XVIII was released as planned on June 2, 2017. It is the first album since 2002's Vanity to feature movie quotes at the beginning of some songs. A music video for the song "Live Again" was also released on the same day.

On August 28, 2017, Josh James was announced as an official member of the band.

In September 2017, it was revealed that the band contemplated reunion as early as 2010 and, later on, in 2013. However, the idea was eventually called off due to various reasons. It was also stated that the track "The Disease, the Decline, and Wasted Time" was written back then.

On July 10, 2019, The band posted a new photo from a recording studio, leading many to believe a new album was being worked on. On January 29, 2020, the band was announced as one of the performers for Furnace Fest 2020. On September 8, 2020, the band announced their new EP "Inferno", and debuted their new song "Sink". The new album is said to be inspired by Dante Alighieri's Divine Comedy.

In June 2021, Eighteen Visions put out two covers; "Them Bones" by Alice In Chains and "D.T.O." by Vision of Disorder. Those covers are part of a 90s rock cover album, 1996, surprise-released on July 9, 2021.

On July 5, 2022, the band released a new recording of their album Vanity in support of the 20th anniversary of the original album.

On June 1, 2023, the band released a new single, "Rot of Humanity", and noted on social media there was "so much more to come...". They released another single, "Reality Killer", on July 1, 2023. Both songs would appear on their EP Purgatorio, released on November 1, 2023.

On 15 June, 2024, a fully re-recorded version of the album Obsession was released for the 20th anniversary of the original album.

On 30 May, 2025, a fully re-recorded version of their second album Until the Ink Runs Out was released to celebrate the 25th anniversary of the original album.

== Legacy and impact ==
In 2011, in an article, "Stealing 18 Visions' ideas: A Book by the 2011 Metalcore Scene", MetalSucks praised the band as pioneers of the metalcore and deathcore sound, as well as one of, if not the first, metalcore band to incorporate clean vocals. The article concluded, "without them, there would be no keyboards in metalcore, no screaming mixed with clean vocals, no tights pants, and no fancy hair in hardcore. There would be no Rise Records, no Attack Attack! and certainly no Avenged Sevenfold or Escape the Fate." Other sources have regarded as being influential on the development of the metalcore genre as well as on contemporary metalcore bands. In 2020, Loudwire ranked the band's 2000 release, Until the Ink Runs Out, at 21 on its list of the 25 best metalcore albums of all time.

In addition to establishing a unique sound, the band was also one of the first metalcore bands to establish a unique image. They broke from mid-1990s hardcore trends by donning high-end attire and styled hair on stage.

Loudwire called them "fashioncore", while admitting that the term "actually isn’t really a subgenre of hardcore at all" and that it "was coined as an insult to hardcore kids who started caring more about how they dyed their hair than the actual music." As a result of this the term "fashioncore" was often applied to band in a derogatory manner (Hart noted that he found this comical). Hart explained the band sought to differentiate itself via its appearance to stand out and leave an impression on fans. Before the band started touring, Floyd and Hart worked at Banana Republic, allowing them to acquire luxury clothing at a discount price. Hart's exposure to fashion was furthered by his employment as a hair stylist (former bassist Javier Van Huss had also gone through the hair academy with Hart). This allowed the band to adopt a high-end look not present in the scene at the time.

== Band members ==
Current members

- James Hart – lead vocals (1995–2007, 2017–present)
- Keith Barney – guitars, keyboards, programming, backing vocals (2000–2007, 2017–present), bass (2017–2023)
- Josh James – guitars, backing vocals (2017–present; touring 2017), bass (2017–2023; touring 2017)
- Matt Horwitz – drums (2023–present; touring 2022)
- Dan Smith – bass (2023–present)

Touring musicians

- Scott Danough – guitar (2001)

Former members

- Ken Floyd – drums, percussion (1995–2003); guitars (2003–2007), keyboards, programming, backing vocals (1995–2007)
- Dave Peters – guitars, vocals (1995–1998)
- Steve Parilla – guitars, backing vocals (1998–1999)
- Jeff Boullt – guitars, backing vocals (1996–1997)
- Brandan Schieppati – guitars, vocals (1997–2002)
- Billy Sisler – bass, backing vocals (1995–1996)
- Richie Taylor – bass, backing vocals (1996)
- Javier Van Huss – bass, keyboards, programming, backing vocals (1996–1997, 1997–2000)
- Zachary Phelps – bass, backing vocals (1997)
- Mick Morris – bass, backing vocals (2000–2007; died 2013)
- Jason Shrout – drums, percussion, backing vocals (2003–2004)
- Trevor Friedrich – drums, percussion, backing vocals (2004–2007, 2017–2022)

Timeline

== Discography ==
Studio albums

- Yesterday Is Time Killed (1999)
- Until the Ink Runs Out (2000)
- The Best of Eighteen Visions (2001)
- Vanity (2002)
- Obsession (2004)
- Eighteen Visions (2006)
- XVIII (2017)
- 1996 (2021)
