= No Time for Love (EP) =

EP by Eighteen Visions
- Released: October 1, 1999
- Genre: Metalcore
- Length: 7:50
- Label: Trustkill (TK0024)

Eighteen Visions chronology
Yesterday Is Time Killed (1998)	No Time for Love (1999)	Until the Ink Runs Out (2000)

No Time for Love is the first release on Truskill Records by Eighteen Visions.

Vinyl releases were as follows:

- 5 Test Press
- 100 Black/Yellow Swirl
- 100 Translucent Yellow
- 1795 Black

Each had a gold sticker representing its press number (2000 in total).

== Track listing ==
1. "Diana Gone Wrong" (3:46)
2. "Russian Roulette with a Trigger Happy Manic Depressive" (2:55)
3. "Isola in the Rain" (1:39)
