= James Hart (vocalist) =

American singer (born 1979)

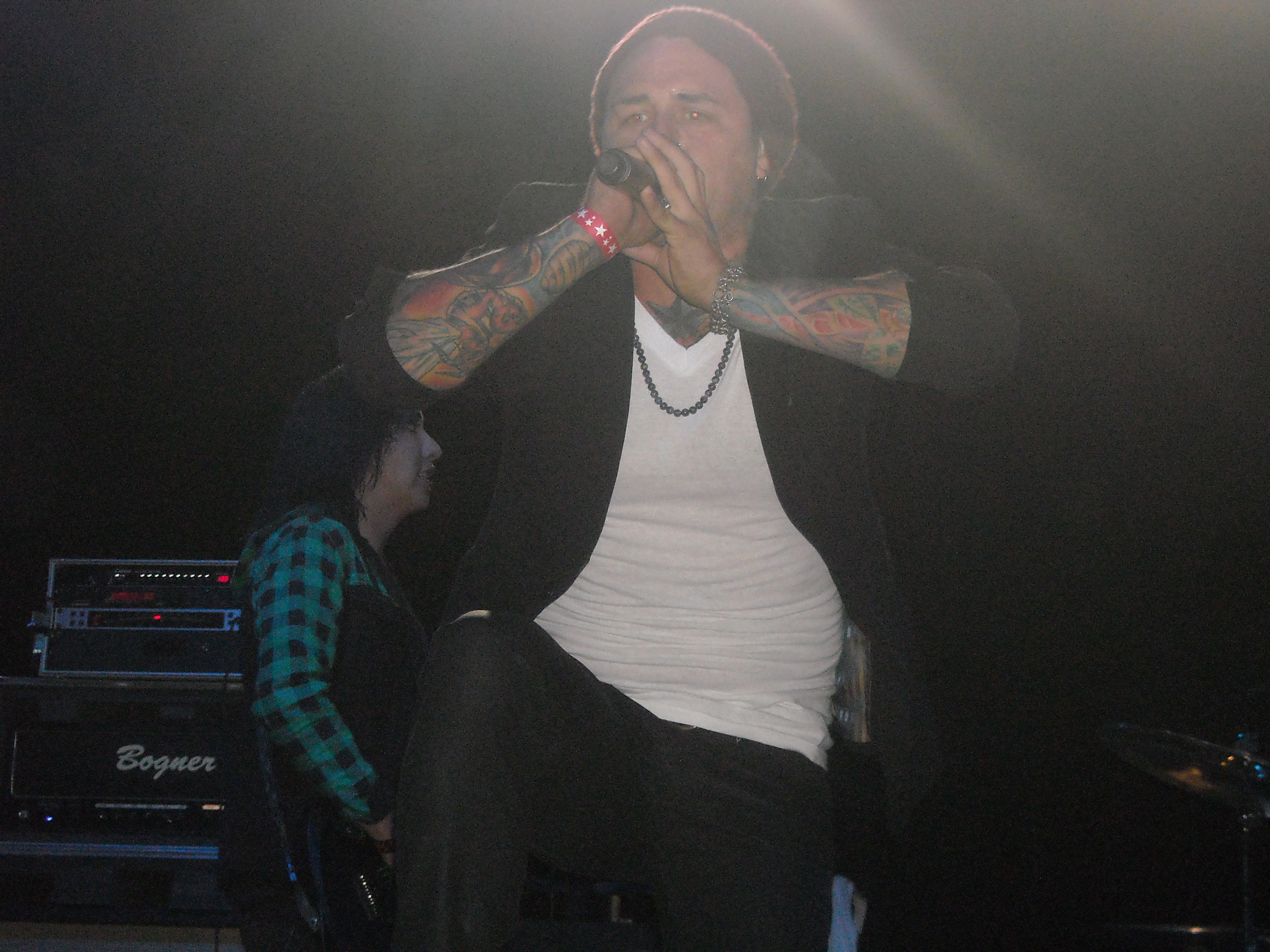
- Hart in 2011

Background information
- Born: August 26, 1979 (age 47); Chicago, Illinois, U.S.
- Genres: Metalcore, alternative rock, post-hardcore, hardcore punk
- Occupation: Singer
- Years active: 1995–present
- Member of: Eighteen Visions
- Formerly of: Burn Halo

James Hart (born August 26, 1979) is an American vocalist, best known as the frontman and founding member of the metalcore band Eighteen Visions. He was also the founding member and lead vocalist of the band Burn Halo, from its inception in 2007 until leaving in 2016.

== Early life ==
Hart was born on August 26, 1979, in Chicago, Illinois. His family moved to California when he was 6. Growing up, he played baseball and football a lot. He considers himself a lifelong Chicago Cubs and Chicago Bears fan. His parents separated and divorced when he was 11, with his father moving away back to Chicago. In 2017, Hart said that both of his parents had been struggling with alcohol at that time, which, in his opinion, ruined their marriage and chance for a happy family life. He also cited that as a major driving force behind his abstinence from alcohol and drugs from a very young age.

He graduated from Huntington Beach High School where he was on his school's baseball and football teams. He used to work at Banana Republic retail store after finishing high school.

== Career ==
=== Eighteen Visions ===
Eighteen Visions originally formed in 1995 by Hart, Dave Peters, Billy Sisler, and Kenneth Floyd. Their first show was at the "Koo's Cafe" in early 1996. Many lineup changes and breakup rumors occurred before the release of their debut album Yesterday Is Time Killed, before eventually finding a stable lineup in 1999. The band went on to release four more studio albums before breaking up in 2007. Hart had this to say concerning the matter:

"After several years of touring and quite a few album releases, we have decided that it is time to go our separate ways. We have been a band for a very long time and feel good about everything we were able to accomplish. At this point in our lives and our careers we feel it's time to move on to something fresh and new. Whether it be music, touring or just being at home to live and enjoy life. We would like to thank all of our fans, friends and families for all of the great support over the years. We would also like to thank all of the bands we have shared the stage with and everyone who has ever worked with the band, opened a door or reached out a hand. We will be playing our final two shows in April. One in San Diego and one in Orange County. Come rock with us one more time."

The band announced its reunion in February 2017, featuring 3 of the 5 members of their 2007's lineup, including Hart. The comeback album "XVIII" was released on June 2, 2017, followed by a live show held in Orange County area on the same day.

=== Burn Halo ===
After the breakup of Eighteen Visions, James Hart worked with former Nixons frontman, Zac Maloy, on a new mainstream rock band called Burn Halo. Originally, Hart conceptualized it to be a solo project; however, during the development of the music and recording, the direction of Hart's idea changed, and Burn Halo was formed.

Three albums thus far have been recorded, with Burn Halo's self-titled debut being released March 31, 2009. The singles from that album were "Dirty Little Girl" and "Save Me". Burn Halo's sophomore release, entitled Up from the Ashes was released June 28, 2011, with the song "Tear It Down" as the lead single. The third album Wolves Of War saw the light of day in 2015. On June 7, 2016, it was announced that James was no longer the vocalist for the band.

== Personal life ==
In 1999, Hart attended beauty school along with a former Eighteen Visions bass player Javier Van Huss. Apart from his music career, he is a certified hair stylist working with men and women. According to his Twitter account, he has been straight edge since 1993. He married his long-term girlfriend Britni in 2015. He's also a fan of Chelsea FC.

== Discography ==
Main albums:

with Eighteen Visions

1997: Lifeless
1998: Yesterday Is Time Killed
1999: No Time for Love
2000: Until The Ink Runs Out
2001: The Best Of Eighteen Visions
2002: Vanity
2004: Obsession
2006: Eighteen Visions
2017: XVIII
2021: 1996

with Burn Halo

2009: Burn Halo
2011: Up from the Ashes
2015: Wolves of War
