= MickDeth =

American musician (1978–2013)

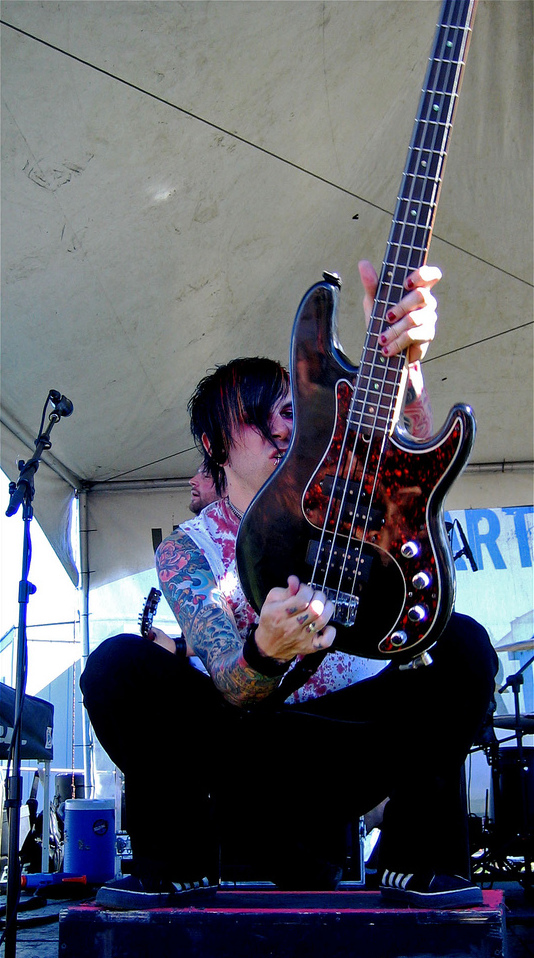
- MickDeth at the Warped Tour 2006 in Washington

Background information
- Also known as: MickDeth, Mr. Deth
- Born: Mick Richard Morris; March 9, 1978; Salt Lake City, Utah, U.S.
- Died: June 3, 2013 (aged 35) Salt Lake City, Utah, U.S.
- Genres: Metalcore, hardcore punk, punk rock, hard rock, heavy metal, alternative metal
- Occupation: Musician
- Instruments: Bass guitar, guitar
- Years active: 1994–2013
- Labels: Trustkill, Epic
- Formerly of: Eighteen Visions, Clear, Die Die My Darling, Elsewhere, Bleeding Through, Dethless Clothing

Mick Richard Morris (March 9, 1978 – June 3, 2013) better known as MickDeth, was an American bassist and guitarist. He was a part of the bands Eighteen Visions, Clear, and the Misfits cover band Die Die My Darling.

== Biography ==
He was raised in Utah, along with his three sisters and brother, by his grandparents. At an early age, he adopted the straight edge lifestyle, having grown up in an environment where drugs were very prominent in his life and family. With such things surrounding his world, Morris decided that he did not want a part of it, ever. As Mick made mention, "Living in Salt Lake City, if you wear anything 'satanic'—even Straight edge because in Salt Lake, that is considered a gang—you can be kicked out of school." Morris attended Highland High School. During his time at Highland High School, he was in the band Elsewhere. Morris dropped out of high school to pursue his music career, originally supposed to graduate in 1996. Though he returned to get his diploma, and graduated when he was 20, in 1998.

MickDeth got into music early on in life. Ever since he saw Metallica's video for their 1989 single "One", he knew he wanted to play music. His father was always supportive of him, playing the guitar himself. He picked up the guitar when he was twelve years old. Morris has been listening to classic rock, punk, 1980s metal, thrash and death metal, hardcore, and gangster rap.

He had been getting tattoos since he turned twenty. His first tattoo was "Drug Free" on his forearm in Milwaukee on Clear's second tour. He stated that he has almost 100 skulls and 200 letters on his body. His most notable tattoos were "Lifeless" across his knuckles, paying tribute to a fellow SLC band, and a portrait of Dimebag Darrell on his calf done by Kat Von D (which was briefly shown on the show Miami Ink).

When Morris moved to California, he held a job at Paul Frank from 2000 until 2003 (when Eighteen Visions became a full-time band). He has modeled for To Die For Clothing as well as Shockhound.com.

Morris was also a judge for the seventh annual Independent Music Awards.

== Clear ==
Clear (originally XclearX) was a straight edge hardcore band from the mid 1990s out of Salt Lake City. MickDeth had always been a fan of the band, going to all of their shows. One day in 1997, Morris received a phone call and was asked to try out for the band when their previous guitarist left. They wrote and recorded a full-length, Deeper Than Blood, which was released in 1999. After Josh left Clear, they added a replacement guitarists and did another tour. After that tour, Mick announced that it was his turn to part ways with the band, mostly for musical differences and stating that they were not really writing songs anymore. Once Mick left the band in 2000, Clear decided not to continue on without him. In February 2007, Clear played a reunion show on February 16, 2007, at the SLUG 18th anniversary show. On the day of the show, Mick stated that he's "never felt the same passion for another band that I felt for Clear."

== Eighteen Visions ==
In late 1999 and early 2000, Clear and Eighteen Visions did an east coast tour together. Six months later, he got a phone call from singer James Hart asking him if he wanted to join the band as bass player. Mick immediately said yes, packed his things up and moved out to California. Before joining Eighteen Visions, Mick had never played bass in his life. During his time in Eighteen Visions, Mick recorded five albums with them. They toured the world, gaining fame and fans. After recording Obsession, they signed to major label Epic Records. On April 9, 2007, Mick announced that Eighteen Visions was no longer.

== Other bands ==
=== Elsewhere ===
Elsewhere was a shoegazing, goth rock band from Salt Lake City that started in high school. Mick has described it to be similar to The Cure and Joy Division. They were on the label Eden's Watchtower.

=== Die Die My Darling ===
Die Die My Darling is a Misfits cover band from Orange County. Mick took a part of Die Die My Darling with fellow Eighteen Visions member Ken Floyd, Bleeding Through's Brandan Schieppati and ex-Burn It Down member, Ryan Downey. Mick played two of three shows with the band, one in 2003 at the Show Case Theatre in Corona, California, and one in 2005 at the House of Blues in Anaheim, California.

=== Bleeding Through ===
Morris filled in on bass for Bleeding Through during 2002 for their record Portrait of the Goddess album. He toured with them in 2002, appearing on the Hellfest 2002, Furnace Fest 2002, and Bleeding Through's Wolves Among Sheep DVDs.

=== Post Eighteen Visions ===
Since the breakup of Eighteen Visions, Mick has toured with Hatebreed as their guitar tech on Ozzfest in 2007, on their spring–summer tour of 2008 and their Mexico City show in early 2009. He was working for shockhound (a part of Hot Topic) and he sold clothes as well as occasionally his old equipment on eBay and craigslist.

=== Dethless Clothing ===
In 2007, Mick started Dethless Clothing. A couple of months after the breakup of Eighteen Visions, Dethless seemed to be finished before it really took off due to personal and financial restraints. On February 21, 2009, Mick announced via MySpace that Dethless Clothing is back in full swing starting with pre-orders on April 1, 2009. Starting April 1, 2009, at midnight a link was set up on the Dethless MySpace to pre-order the first run of blood splatter Dethless shirts. Also, a website is under construction for Dethless Clothing.

== Death ==
On June 3, 2013, Morris died in his sleep from a pre-existing heart condition. During those days he had been in and out of the hospital constantly but was finally released, according to former co-workers. He is survived by his family, including former girlfriend Ashley Jade Thewlis, who is also the mother of his son.
