= Ken Floyd =

American musician

- Birth name: Kenneth William Floyd
- Also known as: K.Flo
- Born: 31 March 1979 (age 46)
- Genres: Hardcore punk, metalcore, punk rock, indie rock post-hardcore electronic rock
- Occupation: Musician
- Instrument(s): Drums, guitar
- Years active: 1994–present
- Formerly of: Eighteen Visions, First Day Somber, Swingset in June, Throwdown, Take the Crown

Ken Floyd is an American drummer and guitarist. He is mostly known from his time in the hardcore band Eighteen Visions which he founded in 1995 as the drummer, and became second guitarist in 2004. He is currently the tour manager for EDM artist Zedd. He has also played drums for several tours with the band Throwdown. From 1996 to 1998 he was in Swingset in June, which released a compilation on Prime Directive Records, and was in First Day Somber before.

He turned down the Eighteen Visions reunion in 2017 to continue to tour as a manager for EDM Artist ZEDD. He did visit the studio during the making of the 2017 reunion album XVIII.
