= Stagecoach Festival =

Music festival

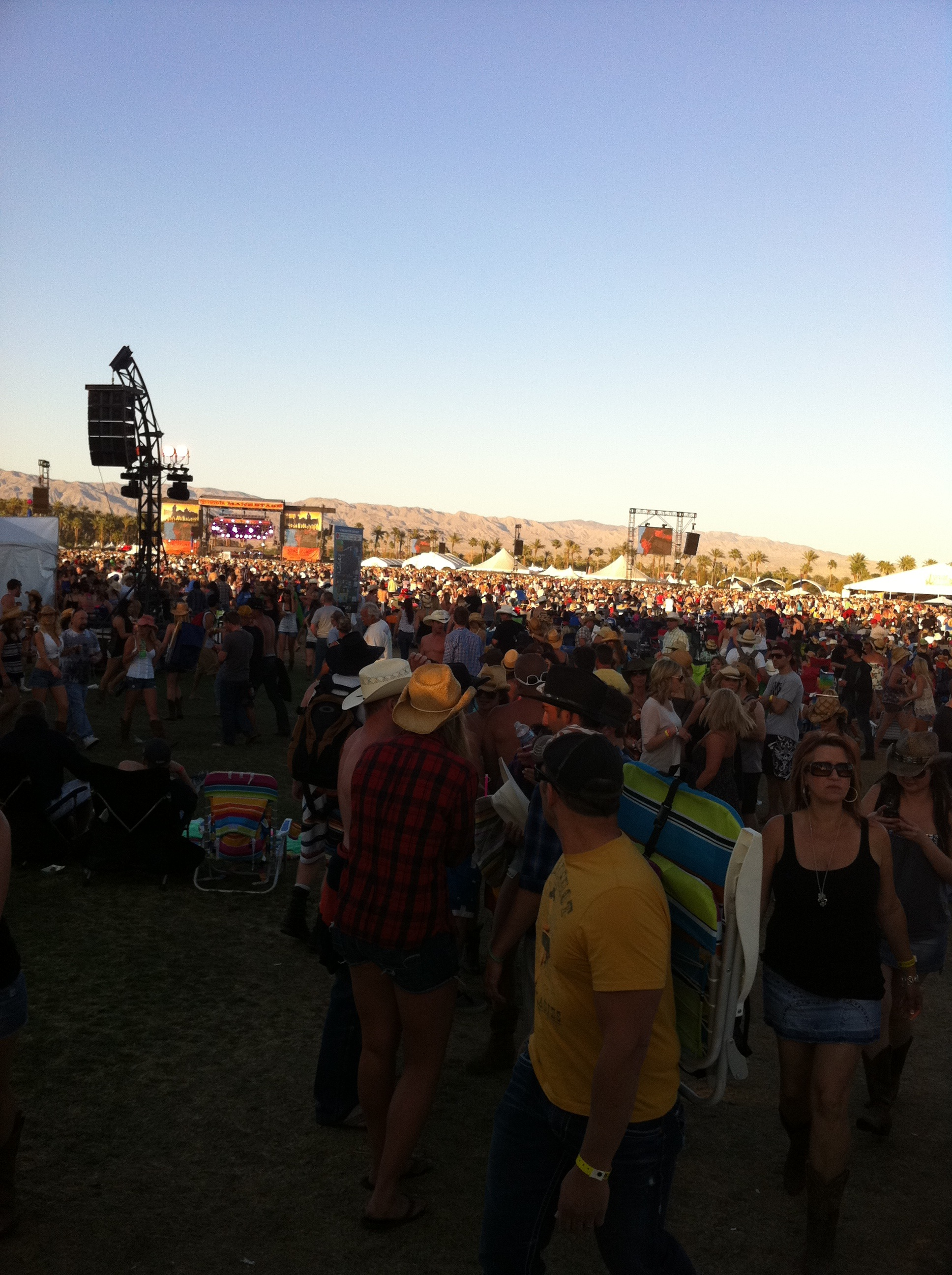
- Entrance to the 2011 festival
- Genre: Country, country rock, Southern rock, bluegrass, heartland rock, alternative country
- Locations: Empire Polo Club; Indio, California, United States
- Years active: 2007–2019, 2022–present
- Website: stagecoachfestival.com

Stagecoach Festival is an annual country music festival held at the Empire Polo Club in Indio, California, in the Coachella Valley in the Colorado Desert. Organized by Goldenvoice, a subsidiary of AEG Presents, it is a sister event to the Coachella festival, and held on the weekend immediately following the conclusion of Coachella.

First held in 2007, the event has attracted country musicians ranging from mainstream and pop, to folk, bluegrass, roots rock, americana, and alternative country, with a focus on veteran performers and up and coming acts. It is the largest and highest-grossing country music festival in the world.

== History ==
Stagecoach was held for the first time in 2007, as a sister event to the Coachella festival. In 2012, the festival's 55,000 attendees marked its first sell-out crowd. In 2018, Stagecoach set a new attendance record with 75,000 attendees; this was surpassed the following year with a peak of 80,000. Stagecoach was cancelled in 2020 and 2021 due to COVID-19.

Notable performers have included Brad Paisley, Jason Aldean, Kenny Chesney, Brooks and Dunn, Toby Keith, Miranda Lambert, Blake Shelton, Sugarland, The Charlie Daniels Band, Alabama. George Strait, Alan Jackson, Willie Nelson, Eagles, Roger McGuinn, Rascal Flatts, Taylor Swift, Tim McGraw, Carrie Underwood, Keith Urban, Martina McBride, Don Williams, Jerry Lee Lewis, Shania Twain, Luke Bryan, Garth Brooks, Eric Church, and Post Malone.

In recent years, Stagecoach has become a hotspot for fans and contestants of the reality dating show The Bachelor, with numerous contestants from Bachelor Nation being invited to attend the festival and post pictures on Instagram. It was revealed that initial drama on Season 6 of the Bachelor spinoff Bachelor in Paradise resulted from romantic relationships that took place at the music festival earlier in the year. Sections of the 2018 film A Star Is Born, starring Bradley Cooper and Lady Gaga, were filmed at Stagecoach.

== Camping ==
The facilities provide on-site camping for some festival-goers. The Desert Sun published an article on the camping, reporting that some attendees think that it, as a standalone event, is almost on par with the concerts. The 2013 festival's tent/car camping policy was eliminated and the RV camping rules altered due to the overwhelming 55,000 person sellout crowd at the 2012 festival. The new rules were to stand until Goldenvoice decided on a different approach.

== Festival cuisine ==
The festival showcases a variety of food and beverages to enjoy over the course of the weekend. Some of the restaurants expected for the 2013 festival were Jackelope Ranch, Las Casuelas, Ruth's Chris Steakhouse, Fisherman's Market & Grill, and vendors like Spicy Pie, Pink's Hot Dogs, and Waffleman Ice Cream Sandwiches. There are also full bars, a Cantina Restaurant, BBQ contest, and a pancake breakfast supporting the local Lions Club.

Kansas City BBQ Society (KCBS) sanctioned the Stagecoach Invitational BBQ Championship encompassing teams from across the nation competing for the KCBS California State championship.

=== Grand champions ===
- 2008 - Sug's Shack BBQ & BLQUE Cuttin Edge Que
- 2009 - Rhythm N' Que & Lotta Bull
- 2010 - Lotta Bull West
- 2011 - All Sauced Up
- 2012 - El Fuego Fiasco

== Lineups by year ==
Edition	Year	Dates	Headliners	Notable acts	Ref
1	2007	5–6 May	George Strait • Kenny Chesney	Alan Jackson, Brooks & Dunn, Sara Evans, Sugarland, Miranda Lambert, Gary Allan, Eric Church, Pat Green, Jamie O'Neal, Jason Aldean, Jason Michael Carroll, Carolyn Dawn Johnson, Willie Nelson, Emmylou Harris, Lucinda Williams, Kris Kristofferson, Earl Scruggs, Ricky Skaggs, Nickel Creek, Junior Brown, Raul Malo, Drive-By Truckers, Neko Case, Alejandro Escovedo, Old 97's, John Doe, Robert Earl Keen, Richie Furay, Doyle Lawson, Chris Hillman and Herb Peterson, Marty Stuart, Yonder Mountain String Band, The Del McCoury Band, Old School Freight Train, The Flatlanders, Riders in the Sky, Asleep at the Wheel, Abigail Washburn, Red Steagall, Don Edwards, Waddie Mitchell, Sons of the San Joaquin, Cowboy Nation	
2	2008	2–4 May	Eagles • Rascal Flatts • Tim McGraw	John Fogerty, The Judds, Carrie Underwood, Trisha Yearwood, Dierks Bentley, Big & Rich, Shelby Lynne, Dwight Yoakam, Gretchen Wilson, Glen Campbell, Taylor Swift, Trace Adkins, Mike Ness, Earl Scruggs, George Jones, Shooter Jennings, Bucky Covington, Jack Ingram, Rissi Palmer, Luke Bryan, Ralph Stanley, Nitty Gritty Dirt Band, Cross Canadian Ragweed, Halfway to Hazard, Michelle Branch, Crystal Shawanda, Jerry Douglas, Craig Morgan, Jypsi, Ian Tyson, Sons of the San Joaquin, Dan Tyminski, The Isaacs, Don Edwards, The Kentucky Headhunters, Michael Martin Murphey, Randy Rogers Band, J. D. Crowe, Chuck Wicks, Cherryholmes, Billy Joe Shaver, Red Steagall, Waddie Mitchell, Ryan Bingham, Charlie Louvin, Sam Bush, Carolina Chocolate Drops, The Greencards, Whiskey Falls, Hayes Carll	
3	2009	25–26 April	Kenny Chesney • Brad Paisley	Reba McEntire, Kid Rock, Little Big Town, Miranda Lambert, Poco, Charlie Daniels Band, Darius Rucker, Earl Scruggs, Chris Cagle, Lady Antebellum, The Reverend Horton Heat, Jerry Jeff Walker, Ricky Skaggs, Ralph Stanley, Lynn Anderson, Doyle Lawson, Peter Rowan, Danielle Peck, Dale Watson, Zac Brown Band, The Duhks, Waddie Mitchell, Randy Houser, The Hot Club of Cowtown, The Infamous Stringdusters, Jim Lauderdale, James Intveld, Kevin Costner & Modern West, Greensky Bluegrass, Sacred Cowboys	
4	2010	24–25 April	Keith Urban • Toby Keith	Sugarland, Brooks & Dunn, Gary Allan, Billy Currington, Phil Vassar, Merle Haggard, The Oak Ridge Boys, Ray Price, Jamey Johnson, The Avett Brothers, Carlene Carter, Bobby Bare, Joey + Rory, B. J. Thomas, Nick 13, Doyle Lawson, Baxter Black, The SteelDrivers, Easton Corbin, Mallary Hope, Chuck Mead, Mary Gauthier, Bill Anderson, Little Jimmy Dickens, Waddie Mitchell, Trampled by Turtles	
5	2011	30 April-1 May	Rascal Flatts • Kenny Chesney	Carrie Underwood, Darius Rucker, Josh Turner, Easton Corbin, Loretta Lynn, Chris Young, Leon Russell, Ricky Skaggs, Jerry Douglas, The Gatlin Brothers, Jack Ingram, K.d. lang, Mel Tillis, Rodney Crowell, Rhonda Vincent, Secret Sisters, Steel Magnolia, Joanna Smith, Wanda Jackson, Rosie Flores, Lukas Nelson, Sara Watkins, Punch Brothers, Coal Porters, Stealing Angels, The Gourds, The CleverlysPhosphorescent, Peter Rowan, The Harters, Truth & Salvage Co.	
6	2012	27–29 April	Brad Paisley • Jason Aldean • Miranda Lambert	Blake Shelton, Alabama, Martina McBride, Kenny Rogers, Luke Bryan, Sheryl Crow, The Mavericks, Sara Evans, The Band Perry, Steve Martin and Steep Canyon Rangers, Chris Isaak, Justin Moore, The Jayhawks, Eli Young Band, Roy Clark, The JaneDear girls, The Del McCoury Band, Brett Eldredge, Aaron Lewis, Ralph Stanley, Uncle Monk, J. D. Crowe, Sara Watkins, Sunny Sweeney, Dave Alvin, The Unforgiven, Greensky Bluegrass, Elizabeth Cook, JD Souther, Old Man Markley, Split Lip Rayfield, Joe Purdy, The Grascals	
7	2013	26–28 April	Toby Keith • Lady Antebellum • Zac Brown Band	Hank Williams Jr., Dierks Bentley, Darius Rucker, Trace Adkins, Rodney Atkins, Thompson Square, Jeff Bridges, Dwight Yoakam, Lonestar, Roger McGuinn, Phil Vassar, The Charlie Daniels Band, Old Crow Medicine Show, Nick 13, Charley Pride, Joe Nichols, John Anderson, Don Williams, Connie Smith, Marty Stuart, Tanya Tucker, The Little Willies, Jana Kramer, John Reilly, Maggie Rose, Justin Townes Earle, Riders in the Sky, Hayes Carll, Suzy Bogguss, Waddie Mitchell, Commander Cody and His Lost Planet Airmen, Robert Ellis, Florida Georgia Line, The Steel Wheels, Becky Stark, Chris Shiflett	
8	2014	25–27 April	Eric Church • Jason Aldean • Luke Bryan	Brantley Gilbert, Hunter Hayes, Florida Georgia Line, Easton Corbin, Jennifer Nettles, Lee Brice, Loretta Lynn, Nitty Gritty Dirt Band, John Prine, Thomas Rhett, Tyler Farr, Dustin Lynch, Shelby Lynne, Crystal Gayle, Chris Cagle, Eric Paslay, Ashley Monroe, Asleep at the Wheel, Jon Pardi, Dan + Shay, Michael Nesmith, Corey Smith, Don McLean, Charlie Worsham, Brenda Lee, Katey Sagal, Shakey Graves, John Conlee, Trampled by Turtles, Danielle Bradbery, Duane Eddy, The Black Lillies, Holly Williams, Shovels & Rope, Nicki Bluhm and The Gramblers, Dan + Shay, Sleepy Man Banjo Boys, Lindsay Ell, Jason Isbell, Kelleigh Bannen, JD McPherson, Hurray for the Riff Raff, Jonny Fritz, Sarah Jarosz, Spirit Family Reunion, The Railers, The Howlin' Brothers, Susanna Hoffs, Radney Foster, The Seldom Scene, I See Hawks In L.A., Corb Lund, The Wild Feathers, Shelly Colvin	
9	2015	24–26 April	Tim McGraw • Miranda Lambert • Blake Shelton	Jake Owen, Dierks Bentley, The Band Perry, Kip Moore, Justin Moore, Sara Evans, Merle Haggard, ZZ Top, George Thorogood, Kacey Musgraves, Eli Young Band, Jerrod Niemann, Parmalee, Gregg Allman, Frankie Ballard, Steve Earle, The Devil Makes Three, The Oak Ridge Boys, Sturgill Simpson, Cassadee Pope, Hot Rize, The Time Jumpers, Charles Esten, Outlaws, The Lone Bellow, Clare Bowen and Chris Carmack, Eric Burdon, Brothers Osborne, The Cadillac Three, The Swon Brothers, Parker Millsap, Mickey Gilley, Maddie & Tae, The Handsome Family, Mac Davis, Chris Janson, Balsam Range, Nikki Lane, Keith Anderson, Lydia Loveless, John Moreland, Chatham County Line, Logan Mize, The Quebe Sisters, Logan Brill, Pegi Young, Daniel Romano, The Ben Miller Band, Cam, Della Mae, Andrew Combs, Lindi Ortega, Clare Dunn, Jason Eady, The Haden Triplets, Anaïs Mitchell, Old Salt Union, David Fanning	
10	2016	29 April-1 May	Eric Church • Carrie Underwood • Luke Bryan	Chris Young, The Band Perry, Little Big Town, Sam Hunt, Joe Nichols, Dustin Lynch, Eric Paslay, Chris Stapleton, A Thousand Horses, Jana Kramer, Mo Pitney, RaeLynn, Kristian Bush, Caitlyn Smith, Old Dominion, Drake White, Brett Young, Lucie Silvas, Emmylou Harris, Rainey Qualley, Ruthie Collins, Robert Earl Keen, Aaron Watson, The Doobie Brothers, Lucero, John Fogerty, Turnpike Troubadours, Dale Watson, Lee Ann Womack, The Marshall Tucker Band, Carl Anderson, Sam Palladio, Johnny Lee, Leroy Powell, Sam Outlaw, Jason Boland & The Stragglers, Marty Stuart, Jamestown Revival, Amanda Shires, Billy Joe Shaver, Luke Bell, Midland, Whitey Morgan, Rodney Crowell, The Earls of Leicester, Cody Jinks, Langhorne Slim, The Deslondes, Aubrie Sellers, Pokey LaFarge, William Elliott Whitmore, Madisen Ward and the Mama Bear, EmiSunshine, Waddie Mitchell, Susto	
11	2017	28–30 April	Dierks Bentley • Shania Twain • Kenny Chesney	Cole Swindell, Brett Eldredge, Thomas Rhett, Randy Houser, Kip Moore, Tyler Farr, Jerry Lee Lewis, Willie Nelson, Travis Tritt, Jon Pardi, Dan + Shay, Cam, Maddie & Tae, Maren Morris, Los Lobos, 38 Special, Jamey Johnson, Cowboy Junkies, Elle King, Margo Price, The Cadillac Three, Elle King, Tucker Beathard, Luke Combs, The Zombies, Nikki Lane, Cody Johnson, Rhiannon Giddens, Robert Ellis, Lanco, Randy Rogers Band, Bobby Bones, Brent Cobb, Keifer Sutherland, Son Volt, William Michael Morgan, Anderson East, Justin Townes Earle, John Moreland, Dylan Scott, Ryan Hurd, Brooke Eden, Drew Holcomb and the Neighbors, The Cactus Blossoms, Levi Hummon, Ruston Kelly, Aaron Lee Tasjan, Bailey Bryan	
12	2018	27–29 April	Florida Georgia Line • Keith Urban • Garth Brooks	Jake Owen, Kacey Musgraves, Lee Brice, Kelsea Ballerini, Brothers Osborne, Trisha Yearwood, Cody Jinks, Dwight Yoakam, Brett Young, Chris Janson, Jason Isbell, Kane Brown, Chris Lane, Granger Smith, Kenny Rogers, Molly Hatchet, Midland, Aaron Watson, Lindsay Ell, Morgan Wallen, Gordon Lightfoot, Jordan Davis, Carly Pearce, Lukas Nelson, The Georgia Satellites, Ronnie Milsap, Ashley McBryde, Seth Ennis, Joshua Hedley, Jade Bird, Colter Wall, Tyler Childers, Brandy Clark, Jillian Jacqueline, Paul Cauthen, Runaway June, Jade Jackson	
13	2019	26–28 April	Luke Bryan • Sam Hunt • Jason Aldean	Cole Swindell, Luke Combs, Old Dominion, Kane Brown, Lynyrd Skynyrd, Lauren Alaina, Bret Michaels, Cam, Tom Jones, Scotty McCreery, Lanco, Jordan Davis, Russell Dickerson, Michael Ray, Danielle Bradbery, Devin Dawson, Sammy Kershaw, Mark Chesnutt, Cody Johnson, Jessie James Decker, Mitchell Tenpenny, Joe Diffie, Travis Denning, Jimmie Allen, Tyler Rich, Whiskey Myers, Jon Langston, Ashley Monroe, Dan Tyminski, Aubrie Sellers, Rita Wilson, Charley Crockett, Whitey Morgan, Terri Clark, Parker Millsap, Abby Anderson, Adam Hambrick, Ruby Boots	
14	2020 (Cancelled)	24–26 April	Thomas Rhett • Carrie Underwood • Eric Church	Brett Young, Dan + Shay, Alan Jackson, Dustin Lynch, Midland, Jon Pardi, Billy Ray Cyrus, ZZ Top, Bryan Adams, Morgan Wallen, LoCash, Chris Lane, Lil Nas X, Tanya Tucker, Riley Green, Mitchell Tenpenny, Jimmie Allen, Neal McCoy, Nikki Lane, Marty Stuart, Shenandoah, RaeLynn, Ryan Bingham, Paul Cauthen, Hardy, Tenille Townes, Gabby Barrett, Pam Tillis, Caylee Hammack, Niko Moon, Ingrid Andress, Jade Jackson, Hayes Carll, The Last Bandoleros, Orville Peck, Brandon Ratcliff, Seaforth, Ian Noe, Hailey Whitters, Whitney Rose, Courtney Marie Andrews, The Haden Triplets, Payton Smith, Laci Kaye Booth	
15	2022	29 April-1 May	Thomas Rhett • Carrie Underwood • Luke Combs	Maren Morris, Brothers Osborne, The Black Crowes, Midland, Lee Brice, Cody Johnson, Brandi Carlile, Cody Jinks, Smokey Robinson, Jordan Davis, Mitchell Tenpenny, LoCash, Tanya Tucker, Margo Price, The Mavericks, Hardy, The Marcus King Band, Jimmie Allen, Yola, Ryan Hurd, Colter Wall, Lindsay Ell, Ingrid Andress, Travis Denning, Rhiannon Giddens, Neal McCoy, Shenandoah, Hailey Whitters, Breland, Orville Peck, Lainey Wilson, Charley Crockett, Caylee Hammack, Hayes Carll, Amythyst Kiah, Molly Tuttle, Waylon Payne, The Cactus Blossoms, Shy Carter, Flatland Cavalry, Reyna Roberts, Laci Kaye Booth, Zach Bryan, Ian Noe, Callista Clark, Jesse Labelle	
16	2023	28–30 April	Luke Bryan • Kane Brown • Chris Stapleton	Jon Pardi, Old Dominion, Brooks & Dunn, Riley Green, Gabby Barrett, Parker McCollum, ZZ Top, Bryan Adams, Tyler Childers, Elle King, Niko Moon, Turnpike Troubadours, Breland, Nelly, Diplo, Melissa Etheridge, Morgan Wade, Lainey Wilson, Priscilla Block, Ryan Bingham, Sammy Kershaw, Marty Stuart, Parmalee, Ian Munsick, Mary Chapin Carpenter, Bailey Zimmerman, Nate Smith, Kameron Marlowe, Luke Grimes, Jackson Dean, Nikki Lane, Valerie June, Trixie Mattel, Corey Kent, Warren Zeiders, Seaforth, Lily Rose, Sierra Ferrell, Drake Milligan, American Aquarium, Restless Road, Flamin' Groovies, The Last Bandoleros, Keb' Mo', Nick Shoulders, Jaime Wyatt	
17	2024	26–28 April	Eric Church • Miranda Lambert • Morgan Wallen	Jelly Roll, Post Malone, Hardy, Elle King, Willie Nelson & Family, Bailey Zimmerman, Dwight Yoakam, Leon Bridges, The Beach Boys, Carín León, Ernest, Megan Moroney, Paul Cauthen, Charley Crockett, Clint Black, Nickelback, Diplo, Wiz Khalifa, Hailey Whitters, Nate Smith, Pam Tillis, Josh Abbott Band, Luke Grimes, Maddie & Tae, Charles Wesley Godwin, The War and Treaty, Josh Ross, Allison Russell, Tenille Townes, Trampled by Turtles, Asleep at the Wheel, Brittney Spencer, Lola Kirke, Casey Barnes, Dylan Schneider, Katie Pruitt, Miko Marks	
18	2025	25–27 April	Zach Bryan • Jelly Roll • Luke Combs	Brothers Osborne, Lana Del Rey, Sturgill Simpson, Mumford & Sons, Nelly, Midland, Sammy Hagar, Carly Pearce, Whiskey Myers, Sierra Ferrell, Ashley McBryde, Shaboozey, Koe Wetzel, Flatland Cavalry, Scotty McCreery, Goo Goo Dolls, Dylan Scott, Tucker Wetmore, Nikki Lane, Dylan Gossett, Niko Moon, Tommy James and the Shondells, Dasha, Tracy Lawrence, Conner Smith, Chayce Beckham, Crystal Gayle, Bryan Martin, Drake Milligan, Tigirlily Gold, George Birge, Annie Bosko, Tiera Kennedy, The Bacon Brothers, Brent Cobb, Drew Parker, John Morgan, Carter Faith, 49 Winchester, Avery Anna, Abi Carter, The Castellows, Blessing Offor, Myles Kennedy, Colby Acuff, Abby Anderson, Anne Wilson, Alana Springsteen, T-Pain, Creed, Backstreet Boys	
19	2026	24–26 April	Cody Johnson • Lainey Wilson • Post Malone	Brooks & Dunn, Bailey Zimmerman, Riley Green, Red Clay Strays, Journey, Hootie & the Blowfish, Dan + Shay, Ella Langley, Little Big Town, Warren Zeiders, Counting Crows, Bush, Third Eye Blind, Sam Barber, Gavin Adcock, Teddy Swims, Wyatt Flores, Nate Smith, Chase Rice, Wynonna Judd, Treaty Oak Revival, Charles Wesley Godwin, Corey Kent, BigXthaPlug, Brett Young, Ty Myers, The Wallflowers, Max McNown, Lyle Lovett, Noah Cyrus, The Marcus King Band, Josh Ross, Billy Bob Thornton & The Boxmasters, Michael Marcagi, Chase Matthew, Hudson Westbrook, Kameron Marlowe, Ryan Hurd, Amos Lee, Ink, Avery Anna, Larkin Poe, Adrien Nunez, Julia Cole, Noah Rinker, Tayler Holder, Hannah McFarland, Neon Union, Benjamin Tod, Tyler Braden, Willow Avalon, Redferrin, Elizabeth Nichols, Lane Pittman, Braxton Keith, Kevin Smiley, S.G. Goodman, Something Out West, Cameron Whitcomb, Eli Young Band, Bayker Blankenship, Jake Worthington, Gabriella Rose, Brandon Wisham, Zach John King, Adam Sanders, Diplo, Pitbull, Ludacris	
20	2027	23–25 April	Riley Green • Zach Top • Garth Brooks	Willie Nelson & Family, Kelly Clarkson, Hardy, Florida Georgia Line, Brothers Osborne, Journey, Pitbull, Cody Jinks, Charley Crockett, Turnpike Troubadours, Shaboozey, Dylan Gossett, Stella Lefty, Stephen Wilson Jr., The Fray, Dasha, Carín León, Matchbox Twenty, Sean Paul, Flo Rida, Gretchen Wilson, Joshua Slone, Jo Dee Messina, Kaitlin Butts, Tedeschi Trucks Band, Maoli, Vincent Mason, Waylon Wyatt, David Lee Roth, Buffalo Traffic Jam, Hudson Westbrook, Ernest, Cameron Whitcomb, Elizabeth Nichols, Owen Reigling, Tyce Delk, Carter Faith, Ingrid Andress, Mack Geiger, Gustavo Mioto, Melissa Etheridge, Chris Lane, Blake Whiten, Dylan Marlowe, Wade Forster, Jacob Hackworth, Jonas Conner, Maggie Antone, Kevin Powers, Kason Scott & The High Heat, Laci Kaye Booth, Mackenzie Carpenter, Tyler Nance, Dalton Davis	

== See also ==
- Country Thunder
