= King of Hearts (King Ernest Baker album) =

Studio album by King Ernest Baker
- Released: 1997
- Studios: Doug Messengers Studio; North Hollywood, CA
- Genres: Blues and soul
- Label: Evidence 26084
- Producers: Randy Chortkoff; Executive producer: Jerry Gordon

King Ernest Baker chronology
King of Hearts (1997)	Blues Got Soul (2000)

King of Hearts was the first CD album for blues, soul singer King Ernest. He had been away from the music scene for some time and the album marked his return to music. It was also a blues award nominee.

== Background ==
After retiring at 55, he recorded the album which was released on Evidence 26084 in 1997. The album includes covers of "Black Bag Blues" which is a Lester Butler song and "Better Days" which was written by Mick Jagger and Jimmy Rip, which is an Otis Redding styled ballad. Charlie Musselwhite's "Long As I Have You" and Hound Dog Taylor's "Sadie" are also covered. Other compositions are by Ernest Baker, Andy Kaulkin and Randy Chortkoff. Lester Butler, Jimmy Rip, and East Hampton guitarist, Zach Zunis are among the musicians that played on the album.

In a review of the album, Nicky Baxter of Metroactive noted the ease that King Ernest had in going from blues to soul and back again. The only low point was some obtrusive piano pounding.

It was nominated in for a W. C. Handy Award in 1998. There were two categories. One was in Soul/Blues Album of the Year category and the other was in the Comeback Blues Album of the Year category.

Bakers follow-up album was in 2000 with Blues Got Soul.

== Album details ==
Tracks
#	Title	Composer	Time
1	"I Resign"	Ernest Baker	4:48
2	"I'm Not The Only One"	Andy Kaulkin	3:44
3	"In The Dark"	Junior Parker	4:08
4	"Black Bag Blues"	Lester Butler	4:27
5	"Better Days"	Mick Jagger - Jimmy Rip	4:39
6	"Long As I Have You"	Charlie Musselwhite	6:16
7	"Tell Me What's The Reason"	Florence Cadrey	3:52
8	"Cryin' For My Baby"	Harold Burrage	5:02
9	"Sadie"	Hound Dog Taylor	5:05
10	"Forgive Me"	Randy Chortkoff	4:16

Production
Role	Name
Produced by	Randy Chortkoff
Executive producer	Jerry Gordon
Post production coordinator	Alan Edwards
Engineer	Glen Nishida
Mixing	Randy Chortkoff & Glen Nishida
Photography	Mark Castle
Art production & design	Mark Castle
Liner notes	Scott Dirks

Musicians
Name	Role	Tracks
King Ernest	Vocals	
Paul Bryant	Guitar	2, 7, 10
Lester Butler	harmonica	4
Lee Campbell	Drums	6, 7
Randy Chortkoff	Harmonica	2, 3, 10
Mitch Kashmar	Harmonica	6
Andy Kaulkin	Piano, Organ	1–3, 5–10
Pete Kay	Drums	4, 5
Tom Leavey	Bass	
Ronnie MacRory	Drums	9, 10
Jonnie Morgan	Drums	2
Jimmy Rip	Guitar	5
Lee Smith	Drums	1, 3, 8
Zac Zunis	Guitar	1, 3, 4, 6, 8–10
The Texicali Horns		1–3, 5, 7, 8
Darrell Leonard	Trumpet	
Joe Sublet	Tenor sax	
