= Jade Jackson =

American country musician (born 1992)

- Born: Jadine Jackson; February 10, 1992 (age 34); Los Osos, California, U.S.
- Genres: Americana; country music
- Occupation: Musician
- Instruments: Vocals; piano; guitar
- Years active: 2017–present
- Label: Anti-
- Website: jadejackson.com

Jadine Jackson (born February 10, 1992) is an American country musician. She has released two solo albums: Gilded (2017) and Wilderness (2019), as well as an album with Aubrie Sellers, Breaking Point (2021).

== Biography ==
Jade Jackson was born on February 10, 1992. She has 2 siblings: Cheynn and Aubrey. Her father often took her to concerts, including those of George Jones and Ray Price. She took piano lessons beginning in the first grade, and when she was 8 years old, her piano teacher had would always have her go first at recitals.

In 2005, when she was 13 years old, Jackson and her family moved from Los Osos, California to Santa Margarita, California, where her parents opened a restaurant with her brother as the head chef. She lived in a house without air-conditioning and was forbidden by her parents, whom Jackson has called "overprotective", from using the Internet or watching television. Jackson then focused on her parents' country music collection for entertainment. As a teenager, she was so shy that she ate school lunch alone in the girls’ bathroom.

When she was 13 years old, she attended her first concert by herself, a performance by Social Distortion in San Luis Obispo; Christine Ness, the wife of lead singer Mike Ness, had been friends with Jackson's mother since high school. The concert inspired her to begin songwriting and, by the time she finished high school, she had written 370 songs. Her early songs had themes of murder or suicide. She would play on street corners and in alleyways. Her dad got her her first performance gig at a coffee shop across the street from the family's restaurant, and every Sunday, after church, her family would go to the coffee shop, where Jackson would play the songs she wrote that week. She then also began performing at wineries up U.S. Route 101 in Paso Robles, California.

She enrolled at San Luis Obispo High School as a senior to "see what it’s like to be a normal kid", at which time she also worked at a restaurant. On April 26, 2009, at the age of 17, Jackson was the opening act for the Charlie Daniels Band and received press coverage in what she describes as a life-changing moment.

While a freshman at the California Institute of the Arts, Jackson broke her back in a 15-foot fall from a rope swing at Sand Canyon. She was allergic to the medication and developed seizures, leading to an addiction to painkillers as well as depression with thoughts of suicide, and eating disorders. The physical recovery was 18 months but the mental recovery took much longer and required therapy.

Christine Ness heard Jackson perform a rough set as a demo in friend’s basement and immediately forwarded a recording to her husband, Mike Ness. After hearing her performances, Mike Ness produced her first album, Gilded in 2017, which was released on Anti-. That year, she was the opening act for Social Distortion concerts.

In February 2017, Jackson was featured on the list "10 New Country Artists You Need to Know" by Rolling Stone.

In 2018, she performed at Stagecoach Festival.

On June 28, 2019, Jackson released her second full-length album titled Wilderness, also produced by Ness.

In February and March 2020, she performed as the opening act for performances by Lucero. She was also scheduled to be the opening act for performances by Amanda Shires.

In 2021, after connecting via Instagram after they both performed on the same day at AmericanaFest in Nashville, Jackson collaborated with Aubrie Sellers and released an album titled Breaking Point.

In July and August 2022, she was the opening act for performances by Collective Soul and Switchfoot.

== Personal life ==
As of July 2019, Jackson had a boyfriend. Jackson's band on Gilded includes friends she knew from church and high school.

== Discography ==
- Gilded [LP] (Anti Records, 2017)
- Wilderness [LP] (Anti Records, 2019)
- Breaking Point [LP] (Anti Records, 2021) as Jackson+Sellers with Aubrie Sellers
- Hush / As You Run [7"] (Lathecuts, 2023)
- Silent Wings [EP] (Bitchin' Music Group, 2024)
