= 15 Years: A Retrospective =

Compilation album by Sons of the San Joaquin
- Released: Oct 8, 2002
- Genre: Western
- Label: Western Jubilee Recording Company/Shanachie

Sons of the San Joaquin chronology
| Sing One For the Cowboy (2000) | 15 Years: A Retrospective (2002) | For the Young, and the Young At Heart (2005) |

15 Years: A Retrospective is the tenth Sons of the San Joaquin album. It contains three previously unreleased songs. According to the liner notes, the previously released material was "digitally re-mixed and re-mastered."

== Track listing ==
All tracks are written by Jack Hannah, except where noted.

| No. | Title | Length |
|---|---|---|
| 1. | "Happy Cowboy" (Bob Nolan) | 2:08 |
| 2. | "Timber Trail" (Tim Spencer) | 2:15 |
| 3. | "The Gift" (Ian Tyson) | 4:05 |
| 4. | "Great American Cowboy" | 4:07 |
| 5. | "Along the Santa Fe Trail" (Al Dubin, Edwina Coolidge, Will Grosz) | 3:15 |
| 6. | "Song of the Rover" (Bob Nolan) | 2:08 |
| 7. | "Wyoming On My Mind" (Charlie Daniels) | 4:18 |
| 8. | "Is It Because" | 4:19 |
| 9. | "Anything But a Cowboy" | 3:25 |
| 10. | "From Whence Came the Cowboy" | 4:25 |
| 11. | "I Ride Along and Dream" | 5:03 |
| 12. | "Charlie and the Boys" | 5:32 |
| 13. | "Texas Plains" (Stuart Hamblen) | 3:21 |
| 14. | "UTAH (With One Eye)" (Previously unreleased) | 3:50 |
| 15. | "Ghost Riders in the Sky" (Stan Jones, previously unreleased) | 4:45 |
| 16. | "The Legend of Jake Kincaid" (Previously unreleased) | 3:21 |

== Personnel ==
Sons of the San Joaquin

- Jack Hannah – vocals, rhythm guitar, percussion
- Joe Hannah – vocals, bass fiddle, percussion
- Lon Hannah – vocals, lead guitar, rhythm guitar, percussion

Additional personnel

- Robert Wagoner – guitar
- Richard Chon – fiddle
- "Doc" Denning – lead guitar, rhythm guitar
- Dennis Mack – bass, rhythm guitar, accordion
- Jeff Hall – percussion, tambourine, lead guitar
- Mike Dana – guitar
- John Lauffenberger – bass
- Rich O'Brien – lead guitar, rhythm guitar
- Bob Embry – clarinet
- Ray Appleton – tambourine, accordion
- Mark Abbott – bass
- Randy Elmore – fiddle
- Dale Morris – fiddle
- Hereford Percy – banjo
- Tim Alexander – accordion
- Eddie Gordon – harmonica

== Production ==
- Sons of the San Joaquin – executive producers
- Jeff Hall – producer (except where noted)
- Russ Pate – producer (except where noted)
- Recorded at:
  - Maximus Recording Studios, Fresno, CA
    - Jeff Hall – engineer
    - Nye Morton – engineer
    - Eric Scherbon – engineer
  - Eagle Audio, Ft. Worth, TX ("I Ride Along and Dream")
    - Rich O'Brien – producer
    - Mark Talmadge – engineer
  - Warehouse Theater, Colorado Springs CO ("Charlie and the Boys", "Texas Plains")
    - Rich O'Brien – producer
    - Scott O'Malley – producer
    - Butch Hause – engineer
    - Mark Petty – engineer
- Mastered at:
  - Capitol Mastering, Los Angeles, CA
    - Robert Vosgien – mastering
    - Pete Papageorges – mastering
- Analog to digital transfers at:
  - Maximus Media, Fresno, CA
    - Eric Sherbon – digital transfers
- David Martin Graham – photography
