= A Cowboy's Song =

Studio album by Sons of the San Joaquin
- Released: February 2011
- Genre: Western
- Label: Western Jubilee Recording Company
- Producer: Rich O'Brien

Sons of the San Joaquin chronology
Live - Western Jubilee Warehouse	A Cowboy's Song

A Cowboy's Song is the fourteenth album released by the Sons of the San Joaquin.

== Track listing ==
All tracks are written by Jack Hannah, except where noted.

No.	Title	Length
1.	"Howdy Do"	2:46
2.	"Chant of the Plains" (Bob Nolan)	2:57
3.	"He's A Rover" (Tim Spencer)	3:11
4.	"The Girl With The Broken Heart"	3:06
5.	"Heaven's Right Here" (Jack Hannah (lyrics), Rich O'Brien (music))	2:38
6.	"Lord, I'm Just An Ol' Cowboy"	3:05
7.	"Have I Told You Lately That I Love You" (Scott Wiseman)	3:41
8.	"Timberline Camp"	3:20
9.	"Slow Movin' Cattle"	3:05
10.	"Down Along the Sleepy Rio Grande" (Roy Rogers)	3:17
11.	"Lie Down Little Dogie, Lie Down"	3:56
12.	"He Don't Want To Cuss The Rough String Anymore"	3:17
13.	"A Cowboy's Song"	3:51
14.	"Ol' Jim Bridger"	3:05

== Personnel ==
Sons of the San Joaquin

- Jack Hannah
- Joe Hannah
- Lon Hannah

Additional personnel

- Rich O'Brien – Guitar, Banjo, Mandolin, Marimba
- Marc Abbott – Bass
- Richard Chon, Reggie Rueffer, Steve Story, Brook Wallace – Fiddles, Strings
- Ginny Mac, Tim Alexander – Accordion, Marimba, Harmonica
- Brandon Fulton – Harmonica
- Johnny Cox – Steel Guitar
- Russ Rand – Bass
- Phil Babcock – Drums, Percussion
- Jon Stutler – Clarinet

== Production ==
- Recorded at:
  - Maximus Media, Fresno, CA
    - Rodger Glaspey – Executive Producer
    - Rich O'Brien – Producer
    - Russ Pate – Assistant Producer
    - Eric Sherbon – Engineer, Vocal Mix
  - Allegro Sound, Burleson, TX
    - Aarom Medor – Engineer, Mix, Mastering
  - Western Jubilee Warehouse, Colorado Springs, CO (title track)
    - Butch Hause – Engineer
- David Martin Graham, Donald Kallaus – Photography
- Donald Kallaus, Kathleen F. Collins, Debra Lake – Layout, Design
- Scott O'Malley & Associates, LLC – artist representation
