= A Cowboy Has to Sing =

Studio album by Sons of the San Joaquin
- Released: January 1992
- Genre: Western
- Label: Warner Western

Sons of the San Joaquin chronology
Bound for the Rio Grande (1991)	A Cowboy Has to Sing (1992)	Songs of the Silver Screen (1993)

Professional ratings
Review scores
Source	Rating
AllMusic	4/5 stars

A Cowboy Has to Sing is the third Sons of the San Joaquin album and the first for a major label. All of the album's songs were written by members of the Sons of the Pioneers. Though newly recorded, the songs on this album can all be found on the two previous releases.

== Track listing ==
No.	Title	Writer(s)	Length
1.	"Timber Trail"	Tim Spencer	2:08
2.	"The Boss Is Hangin' Out a Rainbow"	Bob Nolan	2:36
3.	"Blue Prairie"	Tim Spencer, Bob Nolan	3:52
4.	"Cool Water"	Bob Nolan	3:29
5.	"Way Out There"	Bob Nolan	2:57
6.	"A Cowboy Has to Sing"	Bob Nolan	2:11
7.	"Wind"	Bob Nolan	4:17
8.	"Song of the Rover"	Bob Nolan	2:06
9.	"Moonlight on the Trail"	Tim Spencer	3:12
10.	"So Long to the Red River Valley"	Tim Spencer	2:27

== Personnel ==
=== Sons of the San Joaquin ===
- Jack Hannah
- Joe Hannah
- Lon Hannah

=== Additional personnel ===
- Joey Miskulin – accordion
- Mark Casstevens – acoustic guitar, arch top guitar
- Pat Flynn – acoustic guitar
- Craig Nelson – acoustic bass
- Sonny Garrish – pedal steel
- Rob Hajacos – fiddle
- Dennis Burnside – piano, synthesizer
- Lonnie Wilson – drums, percussion

=== Production ===
- Michael Martin Murphey – executive producer, producer
- Joey Miskulin – producer
- Richard Helm – A&R direction
- Patricia Miskulin – production coordinator
- Recorded at:
  - The Reflections and the Doghouse, Nashville, TN
    - Gary Paczosa – engineer
    - Toby Seay – assistant engineer
    - Marshall Morgan – mixer
- Mastered at:
  - Georgetown Masters, Nashville, TN
    - Denny Purcell – mastering
- William Matthews – watercolor painting
- Steven Whatley – design

Track information and credits verified from the album's liner notes.
