= Choura Events =

US event planner

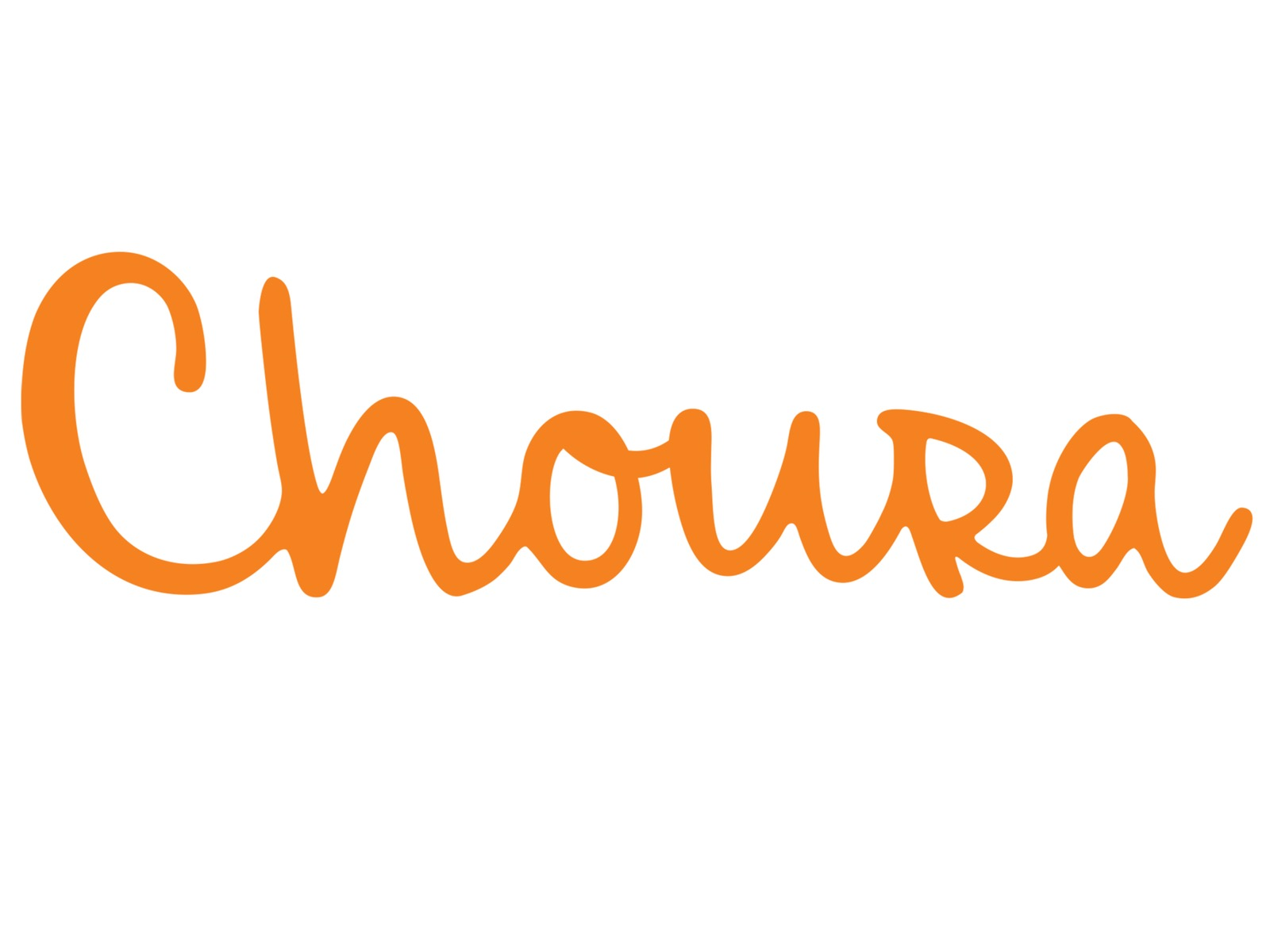
- Company type: Privately held company
- Industry: Event Planning and Equipment Rental
- Founder: Ryan Choura
- Headquarters: Torrance
- Website: choura.co

Choura Events, located in Torrance, California, is a company that specializes in event planning and equipment rental. The company has provided services for events such as the Coachella Valley Music & Arts Festival and the Stagecoach Festival. During the COVID-19 pandemic, Choura Events adapted its business model to provide services to the healthcare sector and local restaurants.

== History ==
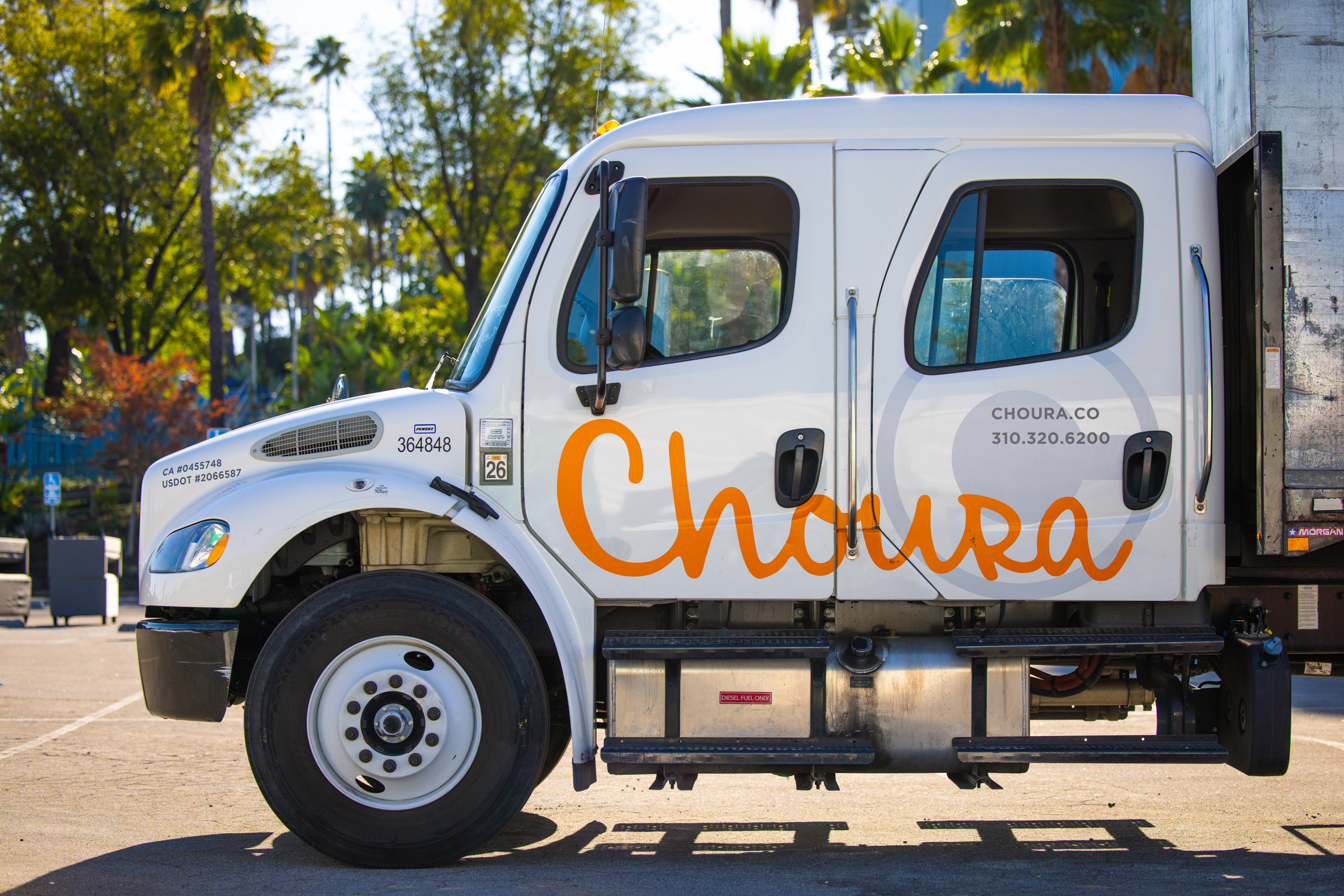
Semi Truck with Choura Events' logo across the driver side door.

Choura Events, an event planning and equipment rental company, was developed from a family catering business. The original business, established by the parents of Ryan Choura in 1969, laid the groundwork for what would eventually become Choura Events. Ryan Choura, who would later become the CEO of Choura Events, began working for the business in 2000. In 2005, he purchased the company from his parents using his earned profits. Choura subsequently acquired two event rental companies and sold the food and beverage portion of the business to concentrate on event services.

In 2017, Choura Events expanded its operations by acquiring a large portion of the tent inventory from Classic Party Rentals, a company based in Inglewood. This acquisition positioned Choura Events as a major tent supplier in the Western United States.

In 2020, Choura Events introduced a new division, Experiential Concepts & Design, to provide an integrated marketing resource for the company's direct-to-brand programs. This division, led by Tatum June, supports clients in content, strategy, and design.

The COVID-19 pandemic in 2020 led to the cancellation of many events, impacting Choura Events' business. In response, the company began constructing triage tents and overflow facilities for hospitals, including the Fountain Valley Regional Medical Center. Choura Events also assisted local restaurants in Long Beach, California, by creating outdoor spaces.
