= Bakersfield Rock & Country Music & Art Festival =

== 2015 Bakersfield Rock & Country Music & Art Festival ==
The 2015 Bakersfield Rock & Country Music & Art Festival is located in Bakersfield, California. It was a one-day series of concerts with 34 national acts, and over 50 local acts all performing on a total of seven stages.

The festival is the brainchild of local attorney George Martin, who for years organized the "Bakersfield Business Conference", a hot-ticket conclave that has drawn to the city A-listers from the worlds of politics, entertainment, and sports. This festival has been compared to those such as Coachella, Stagecoach, Bakersfield Jazz Festival, and many more big name festivals. It was a way for Bakersfield residents to see famous musicians without having to worry about traveling and booking hotels.

=== Stages ===
The festival has three different categories of stages that concert-goers can go to in order to watch their favorite acts. The different stages include: Classic Rock, Country, and Legends. The Classic Rock stage is for attendees who want to take it back a few decades and want the music to "choose them." The country stage is for those who know and love country music, whether they are young or old. The Legends stage is for those who want to travel back in time and relive the legends of country, rock and popular music.

=== Artists performing ===
This festival has brought in over 34 national acts as well as over 50 talented homegrown local acts. The lineup includes some big names such as Kellie Pickler, LeAnn Rimes, Gloriana, and many more. The bands and acts that attended the 2015 Festival were:

- Teddy Spanke & The Tex Pistols
- Kim McAbee
- Mark Dooley
- Andy Dooley
- Truxton Mile
- Johnny Owens
- Amber Appleton
- Theresa Spanke
- Rockwell & The Blackboard Playboys
- Less Besser
- Rick Reno Stevens
- Joe Reed
- Donny Haron
- Red Simpson
- Gene Thome
- Vint Varner
- Jennifer Keel
- Susan Ray
- Whitney Wattenbarger
- Foster & Friends
- The Ray Sisters
- Blonde Faith
- John Hollins Band
- Cowboy Calvin Band
- Kern River Band
- Tommy Hays Band
- Lon Olson
- Fruit Tramps
- Bobby Durham Band
- Banshee in the Kitchen
- The Nightlife Band
- The Bakersfield Band
- Thee Majestics
- Mayf Nutter
- Zach Arnold
- Jeff Davis
- Danny Garone and The Iron Outlaws
- Kevin Mahan
- Tamera Mahan
- Tim Mahan
- Tim Stonelake
- Gary Morgan
- Dueling Pianos
- Catfish Hunter Band
- Becky DeShields
- Peter, Paul and Mary Tribute
- The Wayward Winds
- Tina Michelle & the Rhinestone Cowboys
- Brant Cotton Band
- Grant Langston
- Marc Madewell & the Fireball Express
