= Way Out Yonder =

Way Out Yonder may refer to:

- "Way Out Yonder", a 1955 song by Eddie Dean
- Way Out Yonder (Andy Irvine album), 2000
- Way Out Yonder (Sons of the San Joaquin album), 2005
- Way Out Yonder, a 2019 album by Gyan Riley

== See also ==
- "Way Over Yonder", a song by Carole King from the 1971 album Tapestry
