= For the Young, and the Young at Heart =

For the Young, and the Young At Heart

Studio album by Sons of the San Joaquin
- Released: 2005
- Genre: Western
- Label: Independent

Sons of the San Joaquin chronology
15 Years: A Retrospective (2002)	For the Young, and the Young At Heart (2005)	Way Out Yonder (2005)

For the Young, and the Young At Heart is the eleventh Sons of the San Joaquin album. It was the first to be independently produced and distributed since 1998's Christmas.

== Track listing ==
All tracks are written by Jack Hannah.

No.	Title	Length
1.	"Hitch Up the Wagon"	1:58
2.	"Read, 'Rite & Recite"	1:10
3.	"I Love To Ride My Pony"	1:29
4.	"21 Missions"	3:41
5.	"Joaquin, the Primero Vaquero"	2:11
6.	"The Gold Rush"	3:03
7.	"The Rail Road Song"	2:20
8.	"The Gold In California"	2:23
9.	"There's No Place Like California"	3:50
10.	"His Name Is Sing Song"	1:52
11.	"Patience"	2:02
12.	"Zeke, the Trail Herdin' Cowboy"	2:07
13.	"Hello Waddie"	1:44
14.	"I Wanna Go!"	2:40
15.	"Keep A Pressin' On"	2:35
16.	"It's Great To Be At the Top"	1:34
17.	"The Mountain"	2:39

== Personnel ==
Sons of the San Joaquin

- Jack Hannah
- Joe Hannah
- Lon Hannah

Additional personnel

- Mike Dana - guitar
- Jeff Hall - guitar, percussion
- Richard Chon - fiddle
- Tim Johnson - fiddle
- Dennis Mack - bass
- Eddie Gordon - harmonica

== Production ==
- Sons of the San Joaquin - executive producers
- Russ Pate - album concept and coordination
- Recorded at:
  - Maximus Recording Studios, Fresno, CA
    - Jeff Hall - engineer
    - Eric Sherbon - engineer
    - Ray Settle - second engineer
- Mastered at:
  - Capitol Mastering, Hollywood, CA
    - Robert Vosgien - mastering
- David Martin Graham - photography
