= Songs of the Silver Screen =

Studio album by Sons of the San Joaquin
- Released: August 3, 1993
- Genre: Western
- Label: Warner Western
- Producer: Joey Miskulin

Sons of the San Joaquin chronology
A Cowboy Has to Sing (1992)	Songs of the Silver Screen (1993)	From Whence Came the Cowboy (1995)

Professional ratings
Review scores
Source	Rating
AllMusic	4/5 stars

Songs of the Silver Screen is the fourth Sons of the San Joaquin album and the first for a major label. Like previous albums, all of the songs were written by or notably recorded by the Sons of the Pioneers. Unlike the previous release, only one song in this collection can be found on an earlier Sons of the San Joaquin album ("Empty Saddles").

== Track listing ==
No.	Title	Length
1.	"Cowboy Jubilee" (Ken Carson)	1:49
2.	"Song of the Bandit" (Bob Nolan)	2:57
3.	"Ridin' the Range With You" (Tim Spencer)	3:40
4.	"Cherokee Strip" (Glenn Spencer, Tim Spencer)	2:14
5.	"Empty Saddles" (Bill Hill, J. Keirn Brennan)	3:19
6.	"Yippi-Yi Your Troubles Away" (Glenn Spencer, Tim Spencer)	2:42
7.	"Round Up Time Is Over" (Bob Nolan)	2:57
8.	"Down Where the Rio Flows" (Jennie Lou Carson)	3:11
9.	"Headin' For the Home Corral" (Tim Spencer)	2:07
10.	"He's Ridin' Home" (Bob Nolan)	3:19

== Personnel ==
Sons of the San Joaquin

- Jack Hannah
- Joe Hannah
- Lon Hannah

Additional personnel

- Joey Miskulin - accordion
- Mark Casstevens - acoustic guitar, arch top guitar
- Pat Flynn - acoustic guitar
- Craig Nelson - acoustic bass
- Sonny Garrish - pedal steel
- Rob Hajacos - fiddle
- Dennis Burnside - piano, synthesizer
- Lonnie Wilson - drums, percussion
- "Ranger Doug" Green - Spanish recitation, "Down Where the Rio Flows"

== Production ==
- Joey Miskulin - producer
- Richard Helm - A&R direction
- Patricia Miskulin - production coordinator
- Recorded at:
  - The Reflections and Nightingale Recording Studio, Nashville, TN
    - Gary Paczosa - engineer
    - Ed Simonton - assistant engineer
- Mixed at:
  - The Dog House, Nashville, TN
    - Gary Paczosa - mixer
    - Toby Seay - assistant mixer
- Mastered at:
  - Georgetown Masters, Nashville, TN
    - Denny Purcell - mastering
    - Carlos Grier - digital editing
- Laura LiPuma-Nash - art design
- William Matthews - watercolor painting
- Steven Whatley - design

Track listing and credits verified from the album's liner notes.
