= Rock the Country =

Music festival

- Genre: Country music, Rock music
- Location: Various U.S. locations
- Years active: 2024-present
- Founded: April 5, 2024
- Founder: Kid Rock (co-founder)

Rock the Country is a touring country music-focused festival in the United States with eight stops slated between May and September 2026. Jason Aldean, Jelly Roll, and Blake Shelton are slated to perform, along with event co-founder Kid Rock. Carter Faith, Ludacris, Shinedown, and Morgan Wade have been removed from the lineup.

The 2026 tour started in Bellville, Texas, on May 1, 2026. The two-day event planned for Anderson County, South Carolina, was cancelled.

== Tour Dates ==
2024
Date	City	Venue	Acts	ref.
April 5, 2024	Gonzales	Lamar Dixon Expo Center	Kolby Cooper, Elvie Shane, Travis Tritt, Koe Wetzel, Jason Aldean	
April 6, 2024	Gonzales	Lamar Dixon Expo Center	Sadie Bass, Gavin Adcock, Uncle Kracker, Big & Rich, Gretchen Wilson, Hank Williams Jr., Kid Rock	
April 19, 2024	Ashland	Boyd County Fairgrounds	Dee Jay Silver, Sadie Bass, Colt Ford, Travis Tritt, Miranda Lambert, Jason Aldean	
April 20, 2024	Ashland	Boyd County Fairgrounds	Dee Jay Silver, Elvie Shane, Gavin Adcock, Nelly, Brantley Gilbert, Kid Rock	
May 10, 2024	Rome	Kingston Downs	Dee Jay Silver, Gavin Adcock, Uncle Kracker, Big & Rich, Gretchen Wilson, Travis Tritt, Kid Rock	
May 11, 2024	Rome	Kingston Downs	Dee Jay Silver, Treaty Oak Revival, Colt Ford, Lee Brice, Koe Wetzel, Jason Aldean	
June 7, 2024	Ocala	Majestic Oaks	Sadie Bass, Gavin Adcock, Travis Tritt, Lynyrd Skynyrd, Kid Rock	
June 8, 2024	Ocala	Majestic Oaks	Trippp, Elvie Shane, Warren Zeiders, Brantley Gilbert, Jason Aldean	
June 21, 2024	Mobile	The Grounds	Gavin Adcock, Uncle Kracker, Big & Rich, Gretchen Wilson, Kid Rock	
June 22, 2024	Mobile	The Grounds	Trippp, Sadie Bass, Tyler Farr, Randy Houser, Brantley Gilbert, Jason Aldean	
June 28, 2024	Poplar Bluff	Brick's Offroad Park	Trippp, Dee Jay Silver, Elvie Shane, Gavin Adcock, Uncle Kracker, Travis Tritt, Jason Aldean	
June 29, 2024	Poplar Bluff	Brick's Offroad Park	Sadie Bass, Pecos & the Rooftops, Koe Wetzel, Hank Williams, Jr., DJ Slim McGraw, Kid Rock	
July 26, 2024	Anderson	Anderson Entertainment Center	Gavin Adcock, Elvie Shane, DJ Slim McGraw, Brantley Gilbert, Travis Tritt, Kid Rock	
July 27, 2024	Anderson	Anderson Entertainment Center	Trippp, Sadie Bass, Miranda Lambert, Dee Jay Silver, Big & Rich, Gretchen Wilson, Jason Aldean	
2025
Date	City	Venue	Acts	ref.
April 4, 2025	Livingston	Livingston Parish Fairgrounds	Nickelback, Rehab, Shenandoah, Gavin Adcock, Little Texas, Them Dirty Roses, Jo Dee Messina, DJ Slim McGraw	
April 5, 2025	Livingston	Livingston Parish Fairgrounds	Kid Rock, Lynyrd Skynyrd, Treaty Oak Revival, Mark Chesnutt, Deana Carter, Logan Crosby, Afroman	
April 26, 2025	Knoxville	Maple Lane Farms	Nickelback, Aaron Lewis and The Stateliners, Ella Langley, Shenandoah, Sammy Kershaw, Logan Crosby	
April 27, 2025	Knoxville	Maple Lane Farms	Kid Rock, Lynyrd Skynyrd, Gavin Adcock, Mark Chesnutt, Little Texas, Hudson Westbrook, Afroman	
May 9, 2025	Ocala	Florida Horse Park	Nickelback, Gavin Adcock, Ying Yang Twins, Jo Dee Messina, Diamond Rio, Logan Crosby, Little Texas	
May 10, 2025	Ocala	Florida Horse Park	Kid Rock, Sammy Kershaw, Hank Williams Jr., Mark Chesnutt, Tracy Lawrence, Hudson Westbrook, Afroman	
May 30, 2025	York	York Expo Center	Nickelback, Travis Tritt, Ole 60, Sammy Kershaw, Little Texas, Logan Crosby	
May 31, 2025	York	York Expo Center	Kid Rock, Lynyrd Skynyrd, Gavin Adcock, Mark Chesnutt, Neal McCoy, Hudson Westbrook, Afroman	
June 13, 2025	Hastings	Barry County Fairgrounds	Nickelback, Travis Tritt, Big & Rich, Sammy Kershaw, Little Texas, Logan Crosby, Ying Yang Twins	
June 14, 2025	Hastings	Barry County Fairgrounds	Kid Rock, Lynyrd Skynyrd, Gavin Adcock, Mark Chesnutt, Deana Carter, Hudson Westbrook, Afroman	
June 20, 2025	Little Rock	Arkansas State Fairgrounds	Nickelback, Hank Williams Jr., Ying Yang Twins, Gavin Adcock, Shenandoah, Mark Chesnutt, Logan Crosby	
June 21, 2025	Little Rock	Arkansas State Fairgrounds	Kid Rock, Travis Tritt, Afroman, Hudson Westbrook, Lee Greenwood, Little Texas, Deana Carter	
July 11, 2025	Ashland	Boyd County Fairgrounds	Kid Rock, Dee Jay Silver, Hudson Westbrook, Sammy Kershaw, The Kentucky Headhunters, Shenandoah, Ying Yang Twins, Tracy Lawrence	
July 12, 2025	Ashland	Boyd County Fairgrounds	Nickelback, Dee Jay Silver, Them Dirty Roses, Deana Carter, Mark Chesnutt, Afroman, Hank Williams, Jr.	
July 18, 2025	Sioux Falls	W.H. Lyon Fairgrounds	Kid Rock, DJ Slim McGraw, Hudson Westbrook, Little Texas, Shenandoah, Aaron Lewis and the Stateliners, Ying Yang Twins, Tracy Lawrence	
July 19, 2025	Sioux Falls	W.H. Lyon Fairgrounds	Nickelback, DJ Slim McGraw, Them Dirty Roses, Deana Carter, Mark Chesnutt, Gavin Adcock, Afroman, Travis Tritt	
July 25, 2025	Anderson	Anderson Entertainment Center	Kid Rock, DJ Slim McGraw, Logan Crosby, Little Texas, Shenandoah, Aaron Lewis and the Stateliners, Ying Yang Twins, Tracy Lawrence	
July 26, 2025	Anderson	Anderson Entertainment Center	Nickelback, DJ Slim McGraw, Hudson Westbrook, Mark Chesnutt, Gavin Adcock, Afroman, Hank Williams, Jr.	
2026
Date	City	Venue	Acts	ref.
May 1, 2026	Bellville	Austin County Fairgrounds	Jason Aldean, Chase Matthew, Ella Langley, Gannon Fremin & CCREV, Gracee Shriver, Josh Meloy, Josh Ward, Shenandoah	
May 2, 2026	Bellville	Austin County Fairgrounds	Kid Rock, Callie Princ, Tanner Usrey, Connor Hicks, Diamond Rio, Jackson Wendell, Brantley Gilbert	
May 29, 2026	Bloomingdale	Ottawa Farms	Kid Rock, Connor Hicks, Eddie And The Getaway, Ian Munsick, Jon Langston, Kasey Tyndall, Mackenzie Carpenter, Miranda Lambert, Shenandoah	
May 30, 2026	Bloomingdale	Ottawa Farms	Jelly Roll, Carter Faith, Cole Goodwin, Jay Webb, Josh Turner, Landon Smith, Treaty Oak Revival, Tyler Braden	
June 27, 2026	Sioux Falls	W.H. Lyon Fairgrounds	Kid Rock, Chris Janson, Colt Ford, Colton Bowlin, Demun Jones, Sadie Bass, Treaty Oak Revival, Tyler Halverson, Uncle Kracker	
June 28, 2026	Sioux Falls	W.H. Lyon Fairgrounds	Staind, Allie Colleen, Ashley Cooke, Atlus, Austin Snell, Brantley Gilbert, Connor Hicks, Shaylen, The Marshall Tucker Band	
July 10, 2026	Ashland	Boyd County Fairgrounds	Jelly Roll, 501Bryze, Austin Snell, Brantley Gilbert, cieratherapper, Connor Hicks, Demun Jones, Lynyrd Skynyrd, The Jack Wharff Band	
July 11, 2026	Ashland	Boyd County Fairgrounds	Riley Green, Aaron Lewis and the Stateliners, Colton Bowlin, Dillon Carmichael, Gavin Adcock, Jay Webb, Jesse Howard, Lauren Alaina	
August 8, 2026	Hastings	Barry County Fairgrounds	Kid Rock, Ashley Cooke, Ava Hall, Brantley Gilbert, Cole Goodwin, Connor Hicks, Demun Jones, Sons of Habit, Uncle Kracker	
August 9, 2026	Hastings	Barry County Fairgrounds	Jason Aldean, Chase Matthew, Colton Bowlin, Danny Worship, Sadie Bass, Shenandoah, The Creekers, Treaty Oak Revival	
August 28, 2026	Ocala	Florida Horse Park	Brooks & Dunn, Connor Hicks, Dalton Davis, Emmy Moyen, Lauren Alaina, McCoy Moore, Sadie Bass, Shenandoah	
August 29, 2026	Ocala	Florida Horse Park	Blake Shelton, Jon Pardi, Ashland Craft, Callie Prince, Fox N' Vead, Kenny Whitmire, Mark Chesnutt	
September 11, 2026	Hamburg	Erie County Fairgrounds	Chris Janson, Cole Goodwin, Connor Hicks, Dalton Davis, Emmy Moyen, Hank Williams, Jr., Shenandoah, The Jack Wharff Band	
September 12, 2026	Hamburg	Erie County Fairgrounds	Kid Rock, Nelly, Callie Prince, Gavin Adcock, Josh Ross, Kenny Whitmire, Sadie Bass, Sons of Habit	

== Cancelled Dates ==
2026
Date	City	Venue	Acts	Reason	ref.
July 25, 2026	Anderson	Anderson Entertainment Center	Creed, Brantley Gilbert, Gretchen Wilson, Morgan Wade, Lakeview, Hayden Blount, Highway Home, Connor Hicks, Mac Hankins and the Moonlighters	Cancelled after numerous acts pulled out of the festival's stop	
July 26, 2026	Anderson	Anderson Entertainment Center	Shinedown, Parmalee, Chase Matthew, Fox N' Vead, Neon Union, Bottomland, Eddie And The Getaway, Kenny Whitmire	Cancelled after numerous acts pulled out of the festival's stop	

== See also ==
- 2026 in Michigan
  - 2026 in country music
- List of music festivals in the United States
- MAGA
