= String By =

2025 single by Mack Geiger

Single by Mack Geiger

from the EP Walk a Straight Line
- Released: 31 October 2025
- Genre: Country
- Length: 3:15
- Label: Records Nashville; Columbia
- Songwriter: Mack Geiger
- Producer: Jared Adlam

Mack Geiger singles chronology
| "About Time" (2025) | "String By" (2025) | "Campdraft Queen" (2026) |

"String By" is a song by Australian country music singer Mack Geiger, released on 31 October 2025 as the second single from his debut EP Walk a Straight Line (2026). The song was also included on his debut studio album, Dying in This House (2026).

The song was nominated for Single of the Year, Song of the Year and Music Video of the Year at the 2027 Country Music Awards of Australia.

== Background ==
Geiger stated he did not compose the song with a specific strategy or expectations in mind, instead focusing on writing a song that felt authentic to him. He did not anticipate that the song would achieve widespread success.

== Composition ==
The song consists of steel guitar and is characterized by themes of heartbreak. Lyrically, the song finds Geiger struggling to distance himself from an ex who repeatedly draws him back into their relationship. Although he knows she has been playing with his emotions, he still has feelings for her. In the end, he begs her to find someone else and leave him alone.

== Track listings ==
Digital download'

1. "String By" – 3:15

Digital download'

1. "String By" (acoustic) – 3:25

== Charts ==
Chart performance for "String By"
| Chart (2025–2026) | Peak position |
|---|---|
| Australian Artist (ARIA) | 6 |
| US Billboard Hot 100 | 71 |
| US Country Airplay (Billboard) | 31 |
| US Hot Country Songs (Billboard) | 21 |

== Certifications ==
Certifications for "String By"
| Region | Certification | Certified units/sales |
|---|---|---|
| United States (RIAA) | Gold | 500,000^{‡} |
^{‡} Sales+streaming figures based on certification alone.
