= Way Out Yonder (Sons of the San Joaquin album) =

Studio album by Sons of the San Joaquin
- Released: October 2005
- Genre: Western
- Label: Western Jubilee Recording Company
- Producer: Rich O'Brien

Sons of the San Joaquin chronology
| For the Young, and the Young At Heart | Way Out Yonder (2005) | Live - Western Jubilee Warehouse (2009) |

Way Out Yonder is the twelfth album released by the Sons of the San Joaquin. It was made available through their website in October 2005, and saw a worldwide release in January of the following year.

== Track listing ==
All tracks are written by Jack Hannah, except where noted.

| No. | Title | Length |
|---|---|---|
| 1. | "There's a Rainbow Over the Range" (Tim Spencer) | 2:43 |
| 2. | "Ridin' Up the Glory Trail" | 3:51 |
| 3. | "Song from Nara Visa" (Kenn Lee (words), Jack Hannah (music)) | 3:47 |
| 4. | "The Famous Long X Brand" | 3:33 |
| 5. | "Santa Fe Lights" (Jack Hannah, Bill Thornbury) | 4:42 |
| 6. | "The Ballad of Joaquin Murrieta" | 5:46 |
| 7. | "Little Cowboy" (Bill Thornbury, David Moordigian) | 2:53 |
| 8. | "It's the Open Range for Me" | 2:53 |
| 9. | "A Cowboy's Heart Is in the Saddle" | 3:08 |
| 10. | "Mexicali Rose" (Helen Stone, Jack B. Tenney) | 4:27 |
| 11. | "The Lord of the Rollin' Hills" | 3:51 |
| 12. | "Way Out Yonder" | 4:21 |
| 13. | "Where the Very Same Cottonwoods Grow" | 3:27 |

== Personnel ==
Sons of the San Joaquin

- Jack Hannah
- Joe Hannah
- Lon Hannah

Additional personnel

- Tim Johnson, Steve Story, Randy Elmore, Richard Chon - fiddles
- Ginny Mae - accordion
- Ronny Shultz, Kevin Sherbon - trumpets
- Dennis Mack, Ronnie Ellis, Mark Abbott - bass
- Rich O'Brien - guitar, dobro, banjo, mandolin, percussion

== Production ==
- Recorded at:
  - Maximus Media, Fresno, CA
    - Eric Sherbon - engineer
  - Casey Jones Recording, Burleson, TX
    - Aarom Meador - engineer
  - Western Jubilee Warehouse, Colorado Springs, CO
    - Butch Hause - engineer
- Rich O'Brien - producer
- Russ Pate - assistant producer
- Mastered at Airshow Mastering, Boulder, CO
  - David Glasser - mastering
- Scott O'Malley & Associates, LLC - artist representation

== Notes ==
- This album is dedicated to the memory of Joe Hannah's late wife, Kay.
- Two of the songs were cowritten with Bill Thornbury, who sometimes tours with the group and is best known for his role as Jody Pearson in several of the Phantasm films.
