= Twin Peaks: Music from the Limited Event Series =

2017 album

Soundtrack album by various artists
- Released: September 8, 2017
- Length: 78:26
- Label: Rhino

Professional ratings
Review scores
| Source | Rating |
|---|---|
| AllMusic | 4/5 stars |
| Consequence of Sound | B+ |
| Pitchfork | 7.5/10 |

Twin Peaks: Music from the Limited Event Series is a soundtrack album to the Twin Peaks revival series. It was released on September 8, 2017, by Rhino Entertainment.

Throughout the series, many well-known recording artists would perform studio renditions of their songs at the Roadhouse. Several of the bands were chosen by director David Lynch, including Nine Inch Nails, Sharon Van Etten, and Eddie Vedder. The album contains the majority of the tracks featured in those performances, as well as several songs played diegetically throughout the season.

The score for the revival series was concurrently released as Twin Peaks: Limited Event Series Original Soundtrack.

== Track listing ==
| No. | Title | Writer(s) | Performer(s) | Length |
|---|---|---|---|---|
| 1. | "Twin Peaks Main Theme" (edit) | Angelo Badalamenti; David Lynch | Angelo Badalamenti | 1:29 |
| 2. | "Shadow" | Johnny Jewel; Adam Miller; Nat Walker | Chromatics | 3:45 |
| 3. | "Mississippi" | Jack Torrey | The Cactus Blossoms | 3:59 |
| 4. | "Lark" | Erika Forster; Annie Hart; Heather D'Angelo | Au Revoir Simone | 4:16 |
| 5. | "I Am" | Raphael Saadiq; Taura Stinson | Blunted Beatz | 1:46 |
| 6. | "I Love How You Love Me" | Barry Mann; Larry Kolber | The Paris Sisters | 2:05 |
| 7. | "Snake Eyes" | Riley Lynch; Alex Zhang Hungtai; Dean Hurley | Trouble | 3:52 |
| 8. | "Tarifa" (Roadhouse mix) | Sharon Van Etten | Sharon Van Etten | 4:46 |
| 9. | "She's Gone Away" | Trent Reznor; Atticus Ross | Nine Inch Nails | 6:00 |
| 10. | "My Prayer" | Georges Boulanger; Jimmy Kennedy | The Platters | 2:46 |
| 11. | "No Stars" | Rebekah Del Rio; D. Lynch; John Neff | Rebekah Del Rio | 7:21 |
| 12. | "Viva Las Vegas" | Doc Pomus; Mort Shuman | Shawn Colvin | 4:47 |
| 13. | "Just You" | Badalamenti; D. Lynch | James Marshall | 3:35 |
| 14. | "Green Onions" | Booker T. Jones; Steve Cropper; Al Jackson Jr.; Lewis Steinberg | Booker T. & the M.G.'s | 2:53 |
| 15. | "Wild West" (Roadhouse mix) | Elisabeth Corrin Maurus; Curt Schneider | Lissie | 3:39 |
| 16. | "Sharp Dressed Man" | Billy Gibbons; Dusty Hill; Frank Beard | ZZ Top | 4:14 |
| 17. | "Axolotl" (Roadhouse mix) | Finn Andrews; Jaime Meline; Wilder Zoby | The Veils | 3:03 |
| 18. | "Out of Sand" | Eddie Vedder | Eddie Vedder | 3:27 |
| 19. | "I've Been Loving You Too Long" (live from Monterey Pop) | Otis Redding; Jerry Butler | Otis Redding | 4:05 |
| 20. | "The World Spins" | Badalamenti; D. Lynch | Julee Cruise | 6:38 |
| Total length: | | | | 78:26 |

== Charts ==
| Chart (2017) | Peak position |
|---|---|
| Austrian Albums (Ö3 Austria) | 52 |
| Belgian Albums (Ultratop Flanders) | 26 |
| Belgian Albums (Ultratop Wallonia) | 55 |
| Dutch Albums (Album Top 100) | 74 |
| French Albums (SNEP) | 184 |
| Greek Albums (IFPI) | 42 |
| Spanish Albums (Promusicae) | 25 |
| Swiss Albums (Schweizer Hitparade) | 75 |
| UK Soundtrack Albums (Official Charts) | 4 |
| US Soundtrack Albums (Billboard) | 5 |
