= Dying in This House =

Studio album by Mack Geiger
- Released: 6 November 2026
- Length: 44:35
- Labels: Mack Geiger; Columbia

Mack Geiger chronology
Walk a Straight Line (2026)	Dying in This House (2026)

Singles from Dying in This House
- 1. "Pouring" Released: 14 August 2026; 2. "How It Ends" Released: 23 October 2026

Dying in This House is the debut studio album by Australian country singer Mack Geiger. The album was released on 6 November 2026. The album debuted at number 23 on the ARIA Charts.

Upon announcement, Geiger said the album "channels a broken man's walk through loneliness, heartache, denial, but also glimmers of hope". The album includes "Mess of Blues", "String By" and "Walk a Straight Line" from his debut EP, released in May 2026.

== Critical reception ==
In the feature album review, Courtney Fry from ABC Country said "Mack Geiger is wise beyond his years on his debut album Dying in This House, painting a vivid portrait of heartache, loneliness and denial with his neo-traditional country brush."

Amanda Tempel from Across the Country said "At the heart of Dying in This House are stories about difficult relationships, personal struggles and finding reasons to keep moving forward." Adding "Throughout the collection, Geiger explores those emotions through characters and experiences that reflect his appreciation for traditional country storytelling."

Genevra Siciliano from Country Town said "After a listen of the debut album, Dying in This House... it's obvious that Australia has found its newest country star."

Miquel Batlle Garriga from When the Cowboy Sings gave the album 4.5/5 saying "With Dying in This House, Mack Geiger seems determined to show that traditional country has a voice of its own in Australia too."

== Track listing ==
Dying in This House track listing
No.	Title	Writer(s)	Length
1.	"His & Hers"	Seth Ennis; Wyatt McCubbin; Rob Snyder	3:26
2.	"How Crazy Is That?"	Tony Martin; Mark Nesler; Tim Nichols	2:49
3.	"String By"	Mack Geiger	3:15
4.	"Dying in This House"	Geiger	4:07
5.	"Just Called to Let You Know"	Geiger; Jim Beavers; Bart Butler	3:28
6.	"You Don't Deserve Me"	Geiger	4:00
7.	"Nothing Like Grandma"	Geiger	3:53
8.	"Walk a Straight Line"	Geiger	4:07
9.	"How It Ends"	Geiger; Will Bundy; Johnny Clawson; Rodney Clawson	3:41
10.	"Mess of Blues"	Geiger	4:08
11.	"Pouring"	Geiger	3:34
12.	"Jesus & Jones"	Geiger	4:03
Total length:			44:35

== Charts ==
Weekly chart performance for Dying in This House
Chart (2026)	Peak position
Australian Albums (ARIA)	23
Australian Country Albums (ARIA)	5
US Billboard 200	38
US Top Country Albums (Billboard)	8
