= Pouring (song) =

2026 single by Mack Geiger

Single by Mack Geiger

from the album Dying in This House
- Released: 14 August 2026
- Genre: Country
- Length: 3:34
- Label: Records Nashville; Columbia
- Songwriter: Mack Geiger
- Producer: Jared Adlam

Mack Geiger singles chronology
"Campdraft Queen" (2026)	"Pouring" (2026)	"How It Ends" (2026)

"Pouring" is a song by Australian country music singer Mack Geiger. It was released on 14 August 2026, via Records Nashville and Columbia Records as the lead single from his debut studio album, Dying in This House.

== Composition ==
In the song, Geiger uses an approaching rainstorm as a metaphor for heartbreak, describing it as bringing back memories of a past love and his sadness about the end of their relationship, even long after it has happened.

== Critical reception ==
Writing for Entertainment Focus, James Daykin considered "Pouring" to be "arguably the finest song Geiger has released to date", describing it as "Atmospheric, emotionally rich and beautifully understated." He praised the song's emotional impact and Geiger's understated vocal performance, remarking that it feels "more mature and nuanced" than Geiger's previous songs.

== Charts ==
Chart performance for "Pouring"
Chart (2026)	Peak position
Australian Artist (ARIA)	10
US Billboard Hot 100	73
US Hot Country Songs (Billboard)	22
