= Horses, Cattle and Coyotes =

Studio album by Sons of the San Joaquin
- Released: January 19, 1999
- Genre: Western
- Label: Western Jubilee/Shanachie
- Producer: Joey Miskulin

Sons of the San Joaquin chronology
Christmas (1998)	Horses, Cattle and Coyotes (1999)	Sing One For the Cowboy (2005)

Horses, Cattle and Coyotes is the eighth album from the Sons of the San Joaquin.

== Track listing ==
All tracks are written by Jack Hannah, except where noted.

No.	Title	Length
1.	"Ridin' Easy With the Sun"	3:52
2.	"Livin' the Life of the Trail"	3:26
3.	"Land of Enchantment" (Michael Martin Murphy, Don Cook, Chick Rains)	3:13
4.	"Abilene Town"	2:29
5.	"When the Coyotes Come Near" (Kenn Lee, Jack Hannah)	4:35
6.	"Trail Drive"	4:55
7.	"Trilogy for Roy" ("Shenandoah" - Traditional; "Red River Valley" - Traditional; "Home on the Range" - Brewster M. Higley (lyrics), Daniel E. Kelly (music))	6:20
8.	"He's Runnin' Out of Roundups"	3:22
9.	"I Ride Along and Dream"	4:56
10.	"Border Affair" (Traditional, Poem by Badger Clark)	6:09
11.	"Horses, Cattle and Coyotes"	4:17
12.	"Pale Moon (Over the Bed Ground)"	3:28
13.	"He Just Can't Be Seen From the Road" (Baxter Black, Jack Hannah)	3:44

== Personnel ==
Sons of the San Joaquin

- Jack Hannah
- Joe Hannah
- Lon Hannah

Additional personnel

- Rich O'Brien - acoustic lead and rhythm guitars
- Randy Elmore - rhythm guitar and fiddle
- Dale Morris, Jr. - fiddle
- Tim Alexander - accordions, bajo sexto
- Mark Abbott - acoustic bass
- James Perkins - marimba
- Kevin Bailey - banjo
- Bill Atwood - trumpet
- Greg Hardy - percussion
- Ray Appleton - harmonica

== Production ==
- Rich O'Brien - producer
- Rodger Glaspey - executive producer
- Recorded at:
  - Eagle Audio, Ft. Worth, TX
    - Mike Talmadge - engineer
- Mixed by:
  - Rich O'Brien
  - Mike Talmadge
- Re-Mixed by:
  - Mike Talmadge
  - Rich O'Brien
- Mastered at:
  - Capitol Records, Hollywood, CA
    - Robert Vosgien - mastering
    - Pete Papageorges - mastering
- Marc Blake - photography
