= Christmas (Sons of the San Joaquin album) =

Studio album by Sons of the San Joaquin
- Released: 1998
- Genre: Western, Christmas
- Label: Independent
- Producer: Jeff Hall, Lon Hannah

Sons of the San Joaquin chronology
Gospel Trails (1997)	Christmas (1998)	Horses, Cattle and Coyotes (1999)

Christmas is the seventh album released by the Sons of the San Joaquin. It marks the first independently produced and released Sons recording since 1991's Bound for the Rio Grande. The songs are all Christmas standards. There would not be an original Sons-related Christmas recording until member Lon Hannah's solo album featured a lone Christmas song called "Cowboy Christmas," which was a reworking by Sons associate Bill Thornbury of Percy Faith and Spencer Maxwell's "Christmas Is."

== Track listing ==
No.	Title	Length
1.	"Away in a Manger" (Martin Luther, Carl Nuelle)	2:23
2.	"Deck the Halls" (Traditional)	2:17
3.	"Silent Night" (Joseph Mohr, Franz Gruber)	3:09
4.	"Do You Hear What I Hear?" (Noel Regney, Gloria Shayne)	3:20
5.	"It Came Upon a Midnight Clear" (Edmund H. Shears, Richard S. Will)	3:43
6.	"I Heard the Bells on Christmas Day" (Henry W. Longfellow, J. Baptiste Calkin)	2:29
7.	"Little Drummer Boy" (Katherine Davis, Henry Ondrati, Harry Simeone)	4:05
8.	"O Little Town of Bethlehem" (Phillip Brooks, Lewis H. Redner)	3:23
9.	"I'll Be Home for Christmas" (Kim Gannon, Walter Kent)	3:44
10.	"O Holy Night" (Adolphe Adam)	5:24
11.	"Rudolph the Red-Nosed Reindeer" (Johnny Marks)	3:11

== Personnel ==
Sons of the San Joaquin

- Jack Hannah
- Joe Hannah
- Lon Hannah

Additional personnel

- Kip Lewis - drums
- Darrell Devaurs - piano
- John Lauffenburger - bass
- Eddie Gordon - harmonica
- Ray Appleton - harmonica
- Mike Dana - acoustic guitar, Tacoma papoose, orchestral arrangements
- Dennis Mack - acoustic guitar, Tacoma papoose, accordion
- Lon Hannah - acoustic guitar, Tacoma papoose
- Richard Chon - fiddle
- FAT City Strings - strings
- FAT City Brass - brass
- Ron Catalano - clarinet

== Production ==
- Sons of the San Joaquin - executive producers
- Jeff Hall - executive producer, producer, engineer
- Lon Hannah - producer
- Vince Warner - engineer
- WagonMaster - photography
- Ed. Kesterson - cover design

== Notes ==
- Songwriting credits are as printed on the CD insert. In some cases, these credits may be incorrect. For example, Martin Luther is listed as coauthor of "Away in a Manger." According to the song's Wikipedia entry, this is a "fable." Please refer to each song's individual Wikipedia entry for more detailed information, including proper songwriting attribution.
