= Gospel Trails =

Album by Sons of the San Joaquin

Studio album by Sons of the San Joaquin
- Released: May 20, 1997
- Genre: Western, Gospel
- Label: Western Jubilee Recording Company/Shanachie
- Producer: Joey Miskulin

Sons of the San Joaquin chronology
From Whence Came the Cowboy (1995)	Gospel Trails (1997)	Christmas (1998)

Gospel Trails is the sixth Sons of the San Joaquin album and the first distributed by Western Jubilee Recording Company/Shanachie.

== Track listing ==
No.	Title	Length
1.	"Read the Bible" (Vern "Tim" Spencer)	2:58
2.	"God Leads His Dear Children Along"	3:58
3.	"The Lily of the Valley"	2:59
4.	"Lead Me Gently Home"	3:47
5.	"The Unclouded Day"	3:03
6.	"Beyond the Sunset"	4:05
7.	"There's Power in the Blood"	2:34
8.	"Precious Lord, Take My Hand"	2:51
9.	"In the Sweet By and By"	3:03
10.	"Medley: Sweet Hour of Prayer/Amazing Grace/Great is Thy Faithfulness"	4:16
11.	"It Is No Secret" (Stuart Hamblen)	4:29
12.	"I'll Fly Away"	2:38

== Personnel ==
Sons of the San Joaquin

- Jack Hannah
- Joe Hannah
- Lon Hannah

Additional personnel

- Mark Casstevens, Rich O'Brien - acoustic guitars
- Rob Hajacos - fiddle
- Joey Miskulin - accordion, organ
- Craig Nelson, Jack Jezioro - acoustic bass
- Ray Appleton - harmonica
- Carl Gorodetzky, Pamela Sixfin - violin
- Kristin Wilkinson - viola
- Bob Mason - cello
- Dave Hanson - string arrangements
- Dale Evans Rogers - guest lead vocal, "In the Sweet By and By"

== Production ==
- Joey Miskulin - producer
- Roger Glaspey - executive producer
- Recorded at:
  - B. Truitt Music, Nashville, TN
    - Brent Truitt - engineer
  - Musicwagon Studio, Nashville, TN
    - Joey Miskulin - engineer
  - The Roy Rogers-Dale Evans Museum, Victorville, CA (Dale Evans vocal track)
    - Dorn Calvano - engineer
    - Shane Anthony - engineer
- Mixed at:
  - Musicwagon Studio, Nashville, TN
    - Dan Rudin - mixer
    - Joey Miskulin - mixer
- Mastered at:
  - Georgetown Masters, Nashville, TN
    - Denny Purcell - mastering
    - Don Cobb - editing
- Marc Blake - photography, front cover design
- Dane Scott - Dale Evans photos
- Jack Hannah - notes
- Joan Pelosi - booklet design
