= Sing One for the Cowboy =

Sing One For the Cowboy

Studio album by Sons of the San Joaquin
- Released: October 10, 2000
- Genre: Western
- Label: Western Jubilee Recording Company
- Producer: Rich O'Brien, Scott O'Malley

Sons of the San Joaquin chronology
Horses, Cattle and Coyotes (1999)	Sing One For the Cowboy (2000)	15 Years: A Retrospective (2002)

Professional ratings
Review scores
Source	Rating
AllMusic	3/5 stars
The Encyclopedia of Popular Music	3/5 stars
New York Daily News	3/4 stars

Sing One For the Cowboy is an album by the Sons of the San Joaquin, released in 2000. The band won the Western Heritage Award for the album's title track.

== Critical reception ==
Country Standard Time wrote: "References to the 'Red Man' aside, the group serves up a tasty slice of the Gene Autry-esque West: no bloody gunfights, no syphilitic hookers, just a longing for the trail and a longing to go home and lots of good harmonizing in between." The Gazette wrote that "these Sons offer a romanticized view of cowboy life wrapped up in tight harmonies and melodies that can be sweet on one song and exciting on the next."

== Track listing ==
All tracks are written by Jack Hannah, except where noted.

No.	Title	Length
1.	"Trail to San Antone" (Deuce Spriggins)	2:34
2.	"Still Water Pool" (Bob Nolan)	4:00
3.	"Charlie and the Boys"	5:30
4.	"Sierra Nevada"	4:29
5.	"Sing One For the Cowboy" (Jack Hannah, Darrell Arnold)	4:13
6.	"Rough String Rider" (Jack Hannah (music), Homer Bryant (words))	5:01
7.	"California"	3:46
8.	"Unbroke Hoss"	3:35
9.	"God Gave the Cowboy Montana"	4:22
10.	"Watch Him (Demon Desert)"	4:45
11.	"Texas Plains" (Stuart Hamblen)	3:20
12.	"The West" (Jack Hannah, Baxter Black)	3:57

== Personnel ==
Sons of the San Joaquin

- Jack Hannah - vocals
- Joe Hannah - vocals
- Lon Hannah - vocals

Additional personnel

- Rich O'Brien - lead and rhythm guitars
- Mark Abbott - bass guitar
- Richard Chon, Dale Morris - fiddles
- Tim Alexander - accordion
- Tom "Wolf" Morrell - steel guitar
- Ray Appleton - harmonica
- Bob Meyers - clarinet
- Hereford Percy - banjo
- The Remuda Ensemble
  - Vladimir Petrov - violin I
  - Lydia Svyatolvskaya - violin II
  - Tim Adian - viola
  - Dave Halvorsen - cello
  - Paul Nagem - flute
  - Guy Dutra-Silveira - oboe
  - Ramon Kireilis - clarinet
  - Michael Yopp - French horn
- Dave Hanson - ensemble arrangements
- Kathleen Fox Collins - ensemble producer

== Production ==
- Scott O'Malley - executive producer
- Dane Scott - executive producer
- Rich O'Brien - producer
- Recorded at:
  - The Warehouse Theater, Colorado Springs, CO
    - Butch Hause - engineer
  - ASC, Dallas, TX
    - Mark Petty - engineer
- Mixed at:
  - Delgany Studios, Denver, CO
    - Butch Hause - mixer
    - Rich O'Brien - mixer
    - John Macy - mixer
- Mastered at:
  - Capitol Mastering, Hollywood, CA
    - Robert Vosgien - mastering
    - Pete Papageorges - mastering
- Cover photos by:
  - Marc Blake - photography
  - Donald Kallaus - photography
- Booklet photos by:
  - Donald Kallaus - photography
  - Scott O'Malley - photography
- Tray card photo by:
  - Anne Cline - photography
- Scott O'Malley - cover concept
- Joan Pelosi - cover and booklet layout
- Scott O'Malley & Associates, LLC - artist representation
