= Bound for the Rio Grande =

Bound For the Rio Grande

Studio album by Sons of the San Joaquin
- Released: 1991
- Genre: Western
- Label: Independent

Sons of the San Joaquin chronology
| Great American Cowboy (1990) | Bound For the Rio Grande (1991) | A Cowboy Has to Sing (1992) |

Bound For the Rio Grande is the second Sons of the San Joaquin album. It was independently produced and distributed and contains songs written by or notably recorded by the Sons of the Pioneers.

== Track listing ==
| No. | Title | Length |
|---|---|---|
| 1. | "Bound For the Rio Grande" (Bob Nolan) | 1:51 |
| 2. | "The Boss is Haning Out a Rainbow" (Bob Nolan) | 2:27 |
| 3. | "Wind" (Bob Nolan) | 4:15 |
| 4. | "Red River Valley" (Traditional) | 2:48 |
| 5. | "Bunkhouse Bugle Boy" (Tim Spencer) | 1:41 |
| 6. | "Tumblin' Tumbleweeds" (Bob Nolan) | 2:16 |
| 7. | "Happy Cowboy" (Bob Nolan) | 2:06 |
| 8. | "So Long to the Red River Valley" (Glenn Spencer) | 2:28 |
| 9. | "Blue Prairie" (Bob Nolan) | 3:52 |
| 10. | "When Pay Day Rolls Around" (Bob Nolan) | 1:45 |
| 11. | "Empty Saddles" (B. Hill, J. Brennan) | 2:55 |
| 12. | "Way Out There" (Bob Nolan) | 2:25 |

== Personnel ==
Sons of the San Joaquin

- Jack Hannah - vocals, rhythm guitar
- Joe Hannah - vocals, bass fiddle
- Lon Hannah - vocals, lead guitar, rhythm guitar

Additional personnel

- "Doc" Denning - fiddle, occasional bass fiddle

== Production ==
- Sons of the San Joaquin - producers
- Recorded at:
  - Maximus Recording Studios, Fresno, CA
    - Nye Morton - engineer, mixer
- David M. Graham - photography
- Lance Bowen - design
