= From Whence Came the Cowboy =

Studio album by Sons of the San Joaquin
- Released: October 31, 1995
- Genre: Western
- Label: Warner Western
- Producer: Joey Miskulin

Sons of the San Joaquin chronology
Songs of the Silver Screen (1993)	From Whence Came the Cowboy (1995)	Gospel Trails (1997)

From Whence Came the Cowboy is the fifth album from the Sons of the San Joaquin and the third and final for the Warner Western label. It is the first to feature mostly original songs instead of relying on Sons of the Pioneers songs as they had for their prior releases.

== Track listing ==
All tracks are written by Jack Hannah, except where noted.

No.	Title	Length
1.	"Ridin' for the Roundup in the Springtime"	3:25
2.	"Wyoming On My Mind" (Charlie Daniels)	4:00
3.	"That's Why I'll Never Want to Be Anything But a Cowboy"	3:23
4.	"Cowboy Rough"	2:50
5.	"Prairie Girl"	4:33
6.	"In My Colorado Home" (Jack Hannah, Darrell Arnold)	3:46
7.	"Night Herding Song" (Harry Stephens)	2:28
8.	"Whoopie Ti-Yi-Yo" (Traditional)	3:13
9.	"From Whence Came the Cowboy"	4:22
10.	"Out Where the Cowboys Rope and Ride" (Baxter Black, Jack Hannah)	2:59
11.	"Is It Because"	4:20
12.	"Great American Cowboy"	3:53

== Personnel ==
Sons of the San Joaquin

- Jack Hannah
- Joe Hannah
- Lon Hannah

Additional personnel

- Mark Casstevens, Richard O'Brien, Ronnie Brooks - guitars
- Rob Hajacos - fiddle
- Joey Miskulin - accordion
- Craig Nelson - acoustic bass
- Ray Appleton - harmonica, tambourine
- Mollie O'Brien - vocal, "Prairie Girl"
- Carl Gorodetzky, Pamela Sixfin - violins
- Kristin Wilkinson - viola
- Bob Mason - cello
- Dave Hanson - string arrangements

== Production ==
- Joey Miskulin - producer
- Reno Kling - A&R
- Recorded at:
  - Nightingale Studio, Nashville, TN
    - Gary Paczosa - engineer
  - The Dog House, Nashville, TN
    - Toby Seay - engineer
- Mixed at:
  - The Dog House, Nashville, TN
    - Gary Paczosa - mixer
    - Joey Miskulin - mixer
    - Toby Seay - second engineer
    - Sandy "Dita" Jenkins - second engineer
- Mastered at:
  - The Final Stage, Nashville, TN
    - Randy Leroy - mastering, editing
- Scott O'Malley, Dane Scott, Steve Weaver - artist representation
- Simon Levy - art direction, design
- Garrett Rittenberry - design
- Adam Jahiel - photography

== Notes ==
- "Great American Cowboy" originally appeared as the title track of an earlier Sons album.
