= Anti- (record label) =

American record label

- Parent company: Epitaph Records
- Founded: 1999; 27 years ago
- Founder: Andy Kaulkin
- Distributors: AMPED Distribution (physical); Universal Music Group (worldwide)
- Genre: Various
- Country of origin: U.S.
- Location: Los Angeles, California
- Official website: www.anti.com

Anti- is an American record label founded in 1999 as a sister label to Epitaph Records.

Founded by Andy Kaulkin, Anti- first gained attention by releasing Tom Waits's Grammy Award–winning Mule Variations in 1999. Other veteran recording artists such as rhythm and blues singers Solomon Burke, Bettye LaVette, Mavis Staples and Marianne Faithfull have signed to Anti- after leaving other labels.

== Andy Kaulkin ==
Kaulkin began working for the Epitaph label. His role was looking after the label's data management system. In 1995, he was head of marketing. He eventually worked his way up to become the president for the label, and worked there until 1998. Later he founded Anti-. Under Kaulkin's stewardship, the label began with the release of Mule Variations by Tom Waits which was met with success.

Other artists signed by Kaulkin include Mavis Staples, who came to the label as a result of a meeting between Kaulkin and her manager, and Jade Jackson, whose vivid storytelling attracted Kaulkin.

As a musician, Kaulkin played piano on "Haggard (Like I've Never Been Before)", which was the title track of Merle Haggard's album Like Never Before. He had multiple roles as composer, musician and producer on the Blues Got Soul album by King Ernest.

== Roster ==
- Mose Allison
- Alfa Mist
- Antibalas
- Arc Iris
- The Beths
- Buju Banton
- Blackalicious
- Billy Bragg
- Book of Knots
- Booker T.
- Solomon Burke
- Busdriver
- Kate Bush (US)
- Cadence Weapon
- Calexico
- Neko Case
- Nick Cave and the Bad Seeds
- The Coup
- Christopher Paul Stelling
- Christian Lee Hutson
- Dead Man's Bones
- Deafheaven
- Death Cab for Cutie
- Delicate Steve
- Dr. Dog
- DeVotchKa
- Doe Paoro
- The Dream Syndicate
- The Drums
- Ramblin' Jack Elliott
- Roky Erickson
- Marianne Faithfull
- Tim Fite
- Fleet Foxes
- The Frames
- Sage Francis
- Michael Franti
- Galactic
- A Girl Called Eddy
- Girlpool
- Glitterer
- Greg Graffin
- Grinderman
- Petra Haden
- Merle Haggard
- Curtis Harding
- Jade Jackson
- Japandroids
- John K. Samson
- Joe Henry
- Kelly Hogan
- Katy Kirby
- Jolie Holland
- Islands
- Eddie Izzard
- Daniel Lanois
- Bettye LaVette
- MJ Lenderman
- Sierra Leone's Refugee All Stars
- Lido Pimienta
- The Locust
- Lost in the Trees
- Jason Lytle (ex-Grandaddy)
- Man Man
- Cass McCombs
- The Milk Carton Kids
- Bob Mould
- Muggs
- Os Mutantes
- N.A.S.A.
- One Day as a Lion (until 2011)
- Beth Orton
- Alec Ounsworth
- Pete Philly & Perquisite
- Plains
- The Promise Ring
- Purr
- Rain Machine
- The Robocop Kraus
- Rogue's Gallery: Pirate Ballads, Sea Songs, and Chanteys
- Saintseneca
- The Tallest Man on Earth
- Xavier Rudd
- Xenia Rubinos
- Andy Shauf
- Simian Mobile Disco
- Slow Pulp
- Elliott Smith (posthumously)
- Solillaquists of Sound
- Spoon (Europe only)
- Mavis Staples
- Son Little
- The Swell Season
- Yann Tiersen
- Title Fight (inactive)
- Tricky
- Porter Wagoner
- Tom Waits
- Waxahatchee
- William Elliott Whitmore
- The Weakerthans
- Chuck E. Weiss
- Wilco
- Wynonna & the Big Noise
- Youth Group
