= Blues Got Soul =

Studio album by King Ernest Baker
- Released: September 26, 2000
- Recorded: January–February 2000
- Studio: Doug Messengers Studio, North Hollywood, California
- Genre: Blues, soul
- Length: 40:30
- Label: Fat Possum Records 80334-2
- Producer: Andy Kaulkin

King Ernest Baker chronology
King of Hearts (1997)	Blues Got Soul (2000)

Blues Got Soul was the final album for blues and soul singer King Ernest Baker. He never got to see its release as he was killed in an automobile accident 4 days after finishing it. It was released on the Fat Possum label in 2000. It contains the single "I Must Have Lost My Mind".

== Background ==
The material covered include, "House Where Nobody Lives" which was originally by Tom Waits. It also has "I Must Have Lost My Mind" which has a similarity to an Al Green type of feeling. Other songs on the release include the love song, "Rock Me in Your Arms" and "Blues Conviction". Baker had a hand in composing material for the album. He wrote half of the songs on the album. Bakers vocals were reminiscent of the Memphis soul, Stax sound.

Baker listened to the final mixes for the album on Thursday, March 2, 2000. On Sunday, March 5, while making his way back to Los Angeles, he was killed in a motor vehicle on Highway 101.

Bakers death was reported in the issue of April 3, 2000 CMJ New Music Report, and that according to Fat Possum Records, a release date had not been set.

A single containing two songs from the album was released in 2002 on Grapevine GSX 5004. It was released on 12", 33⅓ RPM format. The songs on the A side were "I Must Have Lost My Mind (Radio Edit)" (3:50) and "I Must Have Lost My Mind (Extended Version)" (5:32). The B side contained "Rock Me In Your Arms" (3:35). The groove on “Wood Rat” has to be heard to be believed. No click track, no edits, one take. The credited producer on the single was Andy Kaulkin. Doug Messenger was the engineer and the post production and edits were by Paul Mooney.

== Track listing ==
Adapted from Discogs.

1. "Suffer And Stay" – 4:20
2. "Blues Conviction" – 5:12
3. "Contentment" – 4:36
4. "Rock Me In Your Arms" – 3:38
5. "House Where Nobody Lives" – 4:03
6. "Fallin' Down On My Face With The Blues" – 4:42
7. "'Till The Day I Die" – 3:02
8. "Must Have Lost My Mind" – 3:53
9. "Wood Rat" – 3:52
10. "Regular Man" – 3:12

== Personnel ==
Adapted from CD Universe

- Background vocals: Deston Berry, Rick Holmstrom, Kincaid Smith
- Bass: Laurence Baulden
- Drums: Steve Mugalian
- Guitar: Rick Holmstrom
- Keyboards: Andy Kaulkin
- Saxophone: Michael Benedict, Efren Santana, Jeff Big Dad Turmes
- Trumpet: Kincaid Smith
- Vocals: King Ernest

Production

- Producer - Andy Kaulkin
- Engineer - Doug Messenger
- Photography - Billy Turner

== Singles ==
Release
Act	Title	Release info	Year	Notes
King Ernest	"Must Have Lost My Mind (Radio Edit)" "Must Have Lost My Mind (Extended Version)" / "Rock Me In Your Arms"	Grapevine GSX 5004	2002	12", 33 ⅓ RPM

== Reviews ==
- Blues Society: King Ernest - Blues Got Soul Review
- All About Jazz: King Ernest: Blues Got Soul by Ed Kopp
- Pop Matters: King Ernest, Blues Got Soul by Barbara Flaska
- Blues Bytes: November 2000, WHAT's NEW
