= Sons of the San Joaquin =

American Western family band

- Origin: San Joaquin Valley, California, United States
- Genres: Western; Country; Gospel
- Years active: 1987–2024
- Label: Warner Western
- Members: Jack Hannah; Joe Hannah; Lon Hannah

The Sons of the San Joaquin was an American Western family band founded in California's Central Valley by brothers Jack and Joe Hannah, and Joe's son, Lon Hannah. In 1987, at Lon's suggestion, the trio first performed together at a birthday party for Lon's grandfather.

Following a performance at the 1989 National Cowboy Poetry Gathering in Elko, Nevada, Michael Martin Murphey invited the group to join him on his Cowboy Songs album. Then, in 1992, the group signed with Warner Western, with Murphey producing their debut album, A Cowboy Has to Sing.

Across their 3-decade career, Sons of the San Joaquin was credited with "rich durability of the traditional Western music they present, as well as the outstanding original cowboy songs" and being reminiscent of the Sons of the Pioneers.

Roy Rogers called them "the only singing group alive who I feel sound like the original Sons of the Pioneers". The trio released over a dozen albums, including a gospel album and a collection of greatest hits.

They were inducted into the Western Music Association Hall of Fame in 2006. Several of their albums have been given awards by the National Cowboy and Western Heritage Museum (Cowboy Hall of Fame).

The Sons of the San Joaquin stopped performing as an active trio in December, 2024, following the death of founding member Joe Hannah. The group had already slowed down significantly after co-founder Jack Hannah's death in July 2022, following complications from West Nile virus.

== Discography ==
- Great American Cowboy (1990)
- Bound for the Rio Grande (1991)
- A Cowboy Has to Sing (1992)
- Songs of the Silver Screen (1993)
- From Whence Came the Cowboy (1995)
- Gospel Trails (1997)
- Christmas (1998)
- Horses, Cattle and Coyotes (1999)
- Sing One for the Cowboy (2000)
- 15 Years: A Retrospective (2002)
- For the Young, and the Young at Heart (2005)
- Way Out Yonder (2005)
- A Cowboy's Song (2011)
- One More Ride (2017)

== Solo discography ==
- Songs of Faith - Jack Hannah
- 'Cause I Always Wanted To - Lon Hannah (2006)
