= The Last Bandoleros =

Tex-Mex, pop-rock band

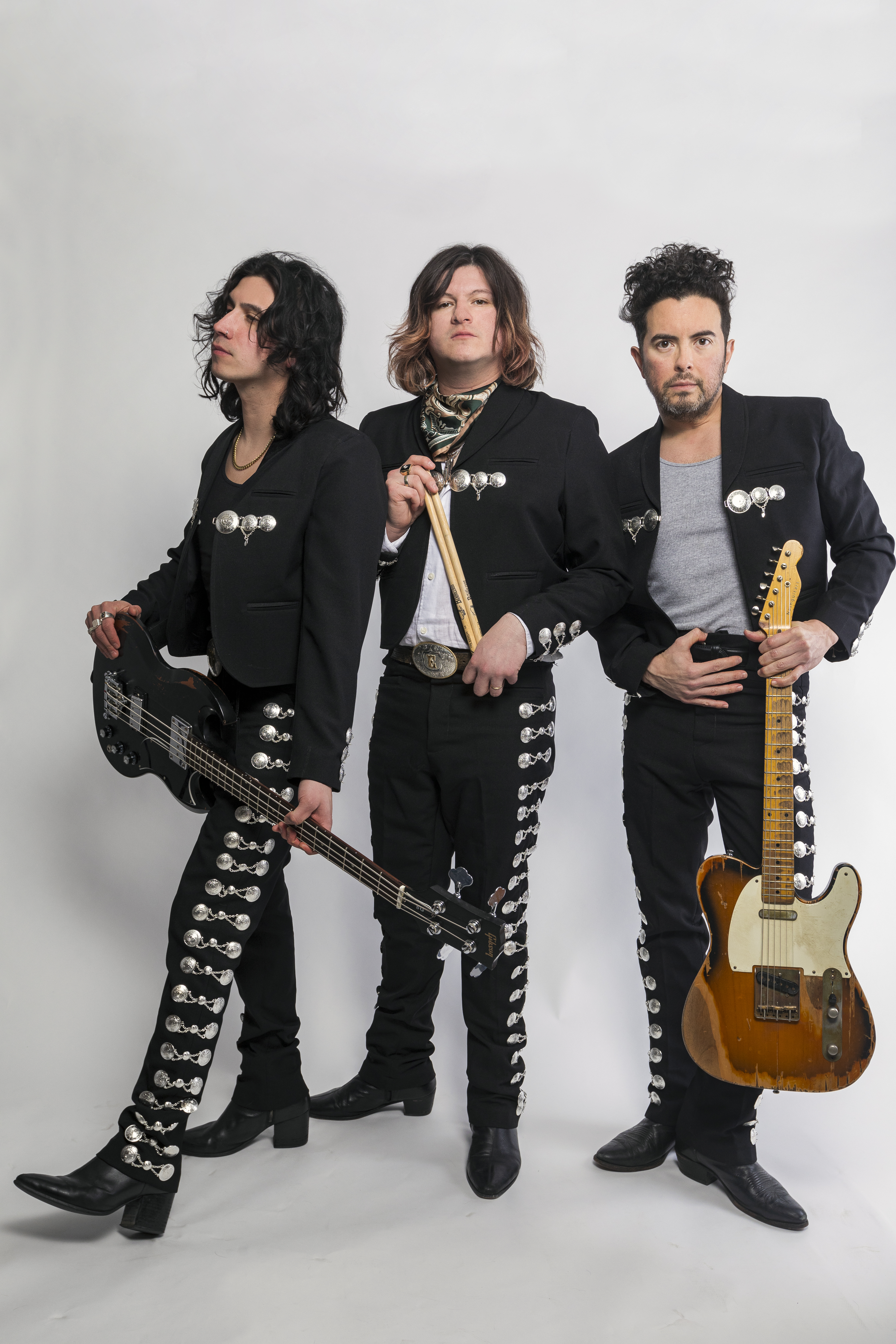

Background information
- Origin: San Antonio, Texas; Brooklyn, New York
- Genres: Tex-Mex; pop-rock; rock; country rock; conjunto
- Years active: 2014–present
- Members: Jerry Fuentes; Diego Navaira; Emilio Navaira IV
- Past members: Derek James
- Website: thelastbandoleros.com

The Last Bandoleros are a Tex-Mex, pop-rock trio originally formed by Jerry Fuentes, Derek James, and brothers Diego and Emilio Navaira IV. The latter two are both sons of Tejano musician Emilio Navaira. The band formed in 2014 as the result of a writing session all four men were a part of while each was working on his own project, though Emilio Navaira IV did not officially join the band until late 2016. They were signed to Warner Music Nashville in November 2015 after Scott Hendricks heard "Where Do You Go?".

== Biography ==
Members Jerry Fuentes, Emilio Navaira IV, and Diego Navaira were born and raised in San Antonio, Texas, and former member Derek James is from New York (state). Fuentes met James when he moved from San Antonio to New York a few years prior to the forming of the band. Fuentes met the Navaira brothers on a trip home to San Antonio and introduced the brothers to James shortly after. Shortly after, the four began performing live together after a writing session that went particularly well.

The band cite numerous influences, primarily The Beatles, rock and roll, Tex-Mex, britpop, and country blues.

They made their late-night television debut on Jimmy Kimmel Live! on July 18, 2016, performing "Where Do You Go?" and "I Don't Want To Know." On November 16, 2016, the band performed a tribute to Emilio Navaira at the 36th annual Tejano Music Awards, held at the Tobin Center for the Performing Arts in San Antonio.

They share a management company with Sting, and as a result, they joined him on his 57th & 9th Tour in 2017 along with Joe Sumner. They are also featured on the track Next To You on the album 57th & 9th as well as on the tour DVD.

Derek James announced his exit from the band on February 4, 2022.

== Discography ==
Albums

- San Antonio (2018)
- Live from Texas (2020)
- Tex Flex (2022)
- Tex Flex Folklórico (2022)

EPs

- The Last Bandoleros (EP) (2016)

Singles

- "Where Do You Go?" (2016)
- "River Man" (2017)
- "Fly with You" (2017)
- "Let Me Love You" (2017)
- "Dancing with Irene" (2018)
- "Love with a Girl" (2018)
- "Let's Run Away" (2018)
- "What Would You Be Doing?" (2018)
- "Enamorado" (2019)
- "Hey Baby Que Pasó (Live from Texas)" (2020)
- "Feliz Navidad" (2020)
- "Maldita" (2021)
- "Only Your Love" (2021)
- "Mas Dinero" (2022)
- "Every Time We Dance" (2022)
- "Vamos a Bailar" (2022)
