= The Cactus Blossoms =

American alternative country and indie folk band

- The band at the 2026 Minnesota State Fair

Background information
- Origin: Minneapolis, Minnesota, United States
- Genres: Alternative country; indie folk
- Years active: 2011–present
- Label: Walkie Talkie Records
- Members: Jack Torrey; Page Burkum
- Website: http://www.thecactusblossoms.com/

The Cactus Blossoms is an American alternative country and indie folk band based in Minneapolis, Minnesota. The band is composed of brothers Jack Torrey (vocals, guitar, bass) and Page Burkum (vocals, guitar) with a touring act including Phillip Hicks (bass), Jake Hanson (guitar), and Jeremy Hanson (drums).

The band's musical styling of "the sounds and approaches of early country and rock n' roll" was inspired by traditional American folk music and "hillbilly" music and is "reminiscent of 60s Nashville and Los Angeles as heard in artists like Roy Orbison, The Byrds, Duane Eddy, and the Everly Brothers."

The band's third studio album, One Day, was released on Walkie Talkie Records on February 11, 2022.

In 2024, the band released their fourth album, "Every Time I Think About You", which was recorded at Creation Audio in Minneapolis and engineered by Alex Hall.

== History ==
The Cactus Blossoms performing in 2026

Brothers Jack Torrey and Page Burkum began playing music at ages 18 and 23, respectively, but did not form the Cactus Blossoms until they were both in their 30s. The band began playing local shows in Minneapolis in 2010 and self-produced and released a self-titled debut album in 2011. Their popularity secured them a residency at St. Paul's Turf Club where they self-produced their first live album titled Live at the Turf Club.

After several tours supporting other artists, JD McPherson proposed working together, and produced their first studio album. In 2015 the band signed with Red House Records, which released their debut studio album, You're Dreaming, on January 22, 2016. The album reached #23 on the Americana Billboard chart and was met with favorable reviews, with American Songwriter describing it as "honest, unvarnished, completely engaging style that is clearly retro but in no way musty."

In 2017, the band appeared in the revival season of David Lynch's television series Twin Peaks, performing the song "Mississippi"; the song is featured on the soundtrack album, Twin Peaks: Music from the Limited Event Series.

In 2017 the band was invited by Dan Auerbach to his Nashville studio to write some songs together. Two of the songs, "Got a Lotta Love" and "Blue as the Ocean" appeared on their studio album Easy Way which released March 1, 2019. Departing Red House Records, the band released the album on their own Walkie Talkie Records label.

After taking a hiatus due to the COVID-19 pandemic, the band began recording their third studio album in an at-home studio. The album, titled One Day, was released on February 11, 2022.

In 2024, The Cactus Blossoms released their fourth studio album, Every Time I Think About You, on August 30 through their independent label, Walkie Talkie Records. The album featured ten tracks, blending elements of alternative country, Americana, rock, and pop. Recorded in Minneapolis, Minnesota, and featured contributions from their longtime touring musicians.

== Members ==
- Jack Torrey (guitar, bass, vocals)
- Page Burkum (guitar, vocals)
- Phillip Hicks (bass)
- Jake Hanson (guitar)
- Jeremy Hanson (drums)

== Discography ==
=== Studio albums ===
Title	Album details	Peak chart positions						
Title	Album details	US	US Indie	US Americana/Folk	US Heatseekers	US Tastemaker		
The Cactus Blossoms	Released: 2011; Label: Self-released	—	—	—	—	—		
You're Dreaming	Released: January 22, 2016; Label: Red House Records	—	—	23	—	—		
Easy Way	Released: March 1, 2019; Label: Walkie Talkie	—	21	—	9	16		
One Day	Released: February 11, 2022; Label: Walkie Talkie	—	—	—	—	—		
Every Time I Think About You	Released: August 30, 2024; Label: Walkie Talkie	—	—	—	—	—	—	"—" denotes album that did not chart or was not released

=== Live albums ===
- Live at the Turf Club (2013)

=== Singles ===
- "Happy Man" (2020)
