= King Ernest Baker =

- Also known as: King Ernest
- Born: Ernest Leon Baker; May 30, 1939; Natchez, Mississippi, United States
- Died: March 5, 2000 (aged 60) Santa Maria, California, United States
- Genres: Soul, R&B, blues
- Occupation: Singer
- Years active: 1958–2000
- Labels: Evidence, Fat Possum Records

"King" Ernest Baker (May 30, 1939 – March 5, 2000) was an American blues and soul singer. He recorded "I Feel Alright" and "That's When I Woke Up." Baker was born in Natchez, Mississippi, and died in a car crash in 2000, just after finishing recording an album.

== Background ==
Coming from a large family, he was the third born of 11 children. Ernest was born in Natchez, Mississippi on May 30, 1939. His great-grandfather was an Italian violinist from Milan who lived to be 109. According to Baker, all of his Southern State children (referred to as half-Mulatto in those times) were violinists and guitar players. His grandfather was part of a Baker Band Revue, which played around and in Louisiana and Mississippi. His father was a guitarist who would play at the Honky-tonk places in the south. He recalled sitting on his fathers knee at around seven years old and listening to his father signing and playing his slide guitar. He would also hold out a cup for the listeners to put money in to.

Blues singer Bobby Bland is a cousin of King Ernest.

== Career ==
His first professional outing was in 1958 with Byther Smith at Wynn's Lounge in Chicago, Illinois. Baker credited Smith with giving him his start as a professional.

He became a popular Chicago club attraction, and performed variously with Tyrone Davis, Buddy Guy and Howlin' Wolf. Being a tall man standing at 6 ft 3in, his shows were quite exuberant and gained him a reputation in Chicago and New York. And with his dancing, comparisons were made to James Brown and Jackie Wilson. The labels he recorded for were, Barry in New York and in Chicago, Sonic, Funk, Mercury and Blue Soul.

Having come back to Chicago from New York he was working with his band he got together. The outfit was called King Ernest and the Soul Invaders. It consisted of a rhythm section, three piece horn section and a bongo player. He also travelled with comedian Emmanuel Arrington. In Chicago he did not do any recording, and from 1967 to 1970 he played the clubs. Throughout the 1970s, he played venues including the Skyway Lounge High Chaparral, and Ernie's Lounge. With his band he also toured around Louisiana and Mississippi a couple of times.

In 1980 he was lured to Los Angeles by the prospect of a record deal. The deal never came to fruition, which was a deciding factor in him leaving the business. Due to the disappointments in his career he got a job with the Sheriffs department. He stayed there for 14 years as a supervisor until retiring at 55.

=== Return to show business ===
Both Bakers cousin plus a promoter / producer Randy Chortkoff were responsible for his return to the stage. Via the classified ads in local papers, Baker recruited his band. With their mix of R&B, funk, gospel and blues, they began playing in clubs in Los Angeles black areas. Baker was hired by Randy Chortkoff as the featured singer in his blues revue, backed by some of Los Angeles' best blues musicians. He started booking King Ernest & the Wild Knights at venues up and down the West Coast.

In 1996 Baker backed by John Marx & the Blues Patrol were set to appear at the Ojai Cupful, which was a downsized version of the popular October Bowlful event. This event was promoted by Michael Kauffer.

Later Baker got a recording contract and his first CD album King of Hearts was released in January 1997 on the Evidence label. One of the musicians that played on it was East Hampton Guitarist Zac Zunis.

In May 1999 Baker undetook a short tour of shows in Israel – eight shows in Tel Aviv and in Eilat, backed by local band "The Daily Blues" (led by harmonica player Dov Hammer).

In 2000, Baker had just finished recording his second album, Blues Got Soul which would end up being his last recording. He had a listen to the CD on March 2.

== Accident and death ==
A few days after listening to his new album, and while on his way back to Los Angeles he was killed in a car crash, near to Santa Maria, California on Highway 101. Baker and his band had done a show at Mothers Tavern, in San Luis Obispo, California. The van containing Baker apparently left the road, rolled over and hit a tree. Baker who was apparently sleeping in the back of the van was killed when he was thrown from it.

== Discography ==
Singles
| Act | Title | Release info | Year | Notes |
|---|---|---|---|---|
| King Ernest | "I Feel Alright" / "Hold It Baby" | Barry 1005 | 1966 | |
| Candy Man and the Candy Bars featuring King Ernest & Yvonne | "Voodoo Man" / "Be My Guy" | Roulette 4707 | 1966 | |
| King Ernest & Yvonne Jones with Candy Man and the Candy Bars | "Strangers In The Night" / "Harlem Moods" | R Records 45–1513 | | Side 2 credited to Candy Man and the Candy Bars |
| King Earnest | "The Soul Stroke (Can You Handle It)" / "The Soul Stroke" | Sonic RC-1000-1 | 1970 | |
| King Ernest Baker | "Somebody Somewhere (Is Playing With Yours)" / (Instr) | Funk Records | 1971 | |
| King Ernest Baker | "I Can't Turn You A Loose" / "That's When I Woke Up" | Supreme Records | | |
| Ernest Baker | "Alone Again" / "Do It With The Feeling (Pt.1)" | Blue Soul 1010 | 1975 | |
| Earnest King | "I Can't Turn It A Loose" / "You Gonna Miss Me" | "LK" Records LK7 | 1976 | |
| Ernest Baker | "Alone Again" / "Do It With The Feeling" | Grapevine 2000 G2K 45–110 | 2001 | |
| King Ernest | "Must Have Lost My Mind (Radio Edit)" "Must Have Lost My Mind (Extended Version)" / "Rock Me In Your Arms" | Grapevine GSX 5004 | 2002 | 12" 33RPM |

Albums
| Act | Title | Release info | Year | F | Notes |
|---|---|---|---|---|---|
| Ernest Baker | Do It with the Feeling | | | LP | |
| King Ernest | King of Hearts | Evidence 26084–2 | 1997 | CD | |
| King Ernest | Blues Got Soul | Fat Possum Records 80334–2 | 2001 | CD | |
