= Mack Geiger =

Australian country musician

- Born: William Mack Geiger
- Origin: Mount Larcom, Queensland, Australia
- Genre: Country
- Occupations: Musician; singer-songwriter
- Instruments: Vocals; guitar
- Years active: 2024–present
- Website: mackgeiger.com

William Mack Geiger is an Australian country singer-songwriter from Mount Larcom, Australia.

== Early life ==
Geiger's father taught him first four chords on the acoustic guitar. During high school, he participated in busking competitions and graced the bill of the Gympie Music Muster festival.

In 2024, he won the Ekka Country Music Showdown and Maleny Country Stars competition.

In December 2024, Geiger signed a management deal with Goldspur Entertainment.

== Career ==
In May 2025, Geiger released his debut single "About Time" which gained traction in both Australia and the United States charting at #35 on the Australian Country Town Charts. In October 2025, Geiger released "String By".

Geiger's debut EP Walk a Straight Line was released in May 2026. Upon release, Geiger said: "My debut project that represents me for me right now. Neo-traditional country music. Six original songs from north-east Australia. Six different stories under one roof."

In June 2026, Geiger made his debut at the Grand Ole Opry. Upon completion of his set, he said, "Thank you to the Grand Ole Opry for this opportunity and letting this Aussie into the big house."

In August 2026, Geiger released "Pouring" and announced the When It's Pouring 2026 tour. Geiger's debut studio album Dying in This House was released on 6 November 2026.

== Discography ==
=== Studio albums ===
List of studio albums, with selected details
Title	Album details	Peak chart positions		
Title	Album details	AUS	US	US Country
Dying in This House	Released: 6 November 2026; Label: Mack Geiger, Columbia; Format: Digital	23	38	8

=== Extended plays ===
List of EPs, with selected details
Title	EP details
Walk a Straight Line	Released: 29 May 2026; Label: Mack Geiger, Columbia; Format: Digital

=== Singles ===
List of singles, with selected peak chart positions
Title	Year	Peak chart positions				Certifications	Album or EP
Title	Year	AUS Artist	US	US Country	US Country Airplay	Certifications	Album or EP
"About Time"	2025	—	—	—	—		Walk a Straight Line
"String By"	2025	6	71	21	31	RIAA: Gold	Walk a Straight Line
"Campdraft Queen"	2026	—	—	—	—		Walk a Straight Line
"Pouring"	2026	10	73	22	—		Dying in This House
"How It Ends"	2026	—	—	—	—		Dying in This House

=== Other charted songs ===
List of other charted songs, with selected peak chart positions
Title	Year	Peak chart positions		Album
Title	Year	US	US Country	Album
"Dying in This House"	2026	90	28	Dying in This House

== Awards and nominations ==
=== Country Music Awards (CMAA) ===
The Country Music Awards of Australia (CMAA) (also known as the Golden Guitar Awards) is an annual awards night held in January during the Tamworth Country Music Festival, celebrating recording excellence in the Australian country music industry. They have been held annually since 1973.

Year	Nominee / work	Award	Result	Ref.
2027	"String By"	Song of the Year	Pending	
2027	"String By"	Single of the Year	Pending	
2027	"String By"	Video of the Year	Pending	
2027	Mack Geiger	New Talent of the Year	Pending	
2027	Mack Geiger	Male Artist of Year	Pending	
