= Aubrie Sellers =

American singer-songwriter (born 1991)

- Born: Aubrie Lee Sellers; February 12, 1991 (age 35); Nashville, Tennessee, U.S.
- Genres: Alternative country
- Occupations: Singer; songwriter; musician
- Instruments: Vocals; guitar
- Years active: 2015–present
- Label: Warner Music Nashville
- Website: www.aubriesellers.com

Aubrie Lee Sellers (born February 12, 1991) is an American country music singer, songwriter, and musician. She is the daughter of singer/songwriters Jason Sellers and Lee Ann Womack; and the stepdaughter of music producer Frank Liddell. Sellers's debut album, New City Blues, was released on January 29, 2016, through Carnival Music. Many of the songs on New City Blues were co-written with Adam Wright.

She was featured on Dr. Ralph's 2015 album, Ralph Stanley and Friends: A Man of Constant Sorrow, where she sang “White Dove” with her mother.

== Influences ==
Sellers has cited numerous musical influences that reach across genres: The Kinks, Screamin' Jay Hawkins, Buddy and Julie Miller, Creedence Clearwater Revival, Ricky Skaggs, Patty Griffin, Neil Young, Bob Dylan, Ralph Stanley and Led Zeppelin.

== Discography ==
=== Albums ===
Title	Album details	Peak chart positions			Sales
Title	Album details	US Country	US Heat	US Indie	Sales
New City Blues	Release date: January 29, 2016; Label: Carnival Recording Company	23	6	20	US: 2,000
Far from Home	Release date: February 7, 2020; Label: Soundly Music	—	—	—	US: 600
"—" denotes releases that did not chart
Attachment Theory	Release date: March 20, 2026; Label: Casual Media Partners				

=== Other appearances ===
Year	Artist	Song	Album
2014	David Nail	"Brand New Day"	I'm a Fire
2015	Ralph Stanley Lee Ann Womack	"Man of Constant Sorrow"	White Dove

=== Singles ===
Year	Single	Album
2016	"Light of Day"	New City Blues
2016	"Sit Here and Cry"	New City Blues
2017	"Liar Liar"	New City Blues

=== Music videos ===
Year	Video	Director
2016	"Sit Here and Cry"	Roger Pistole
2017	"Paper Doll"	
