= Neon Union =

Country music duo

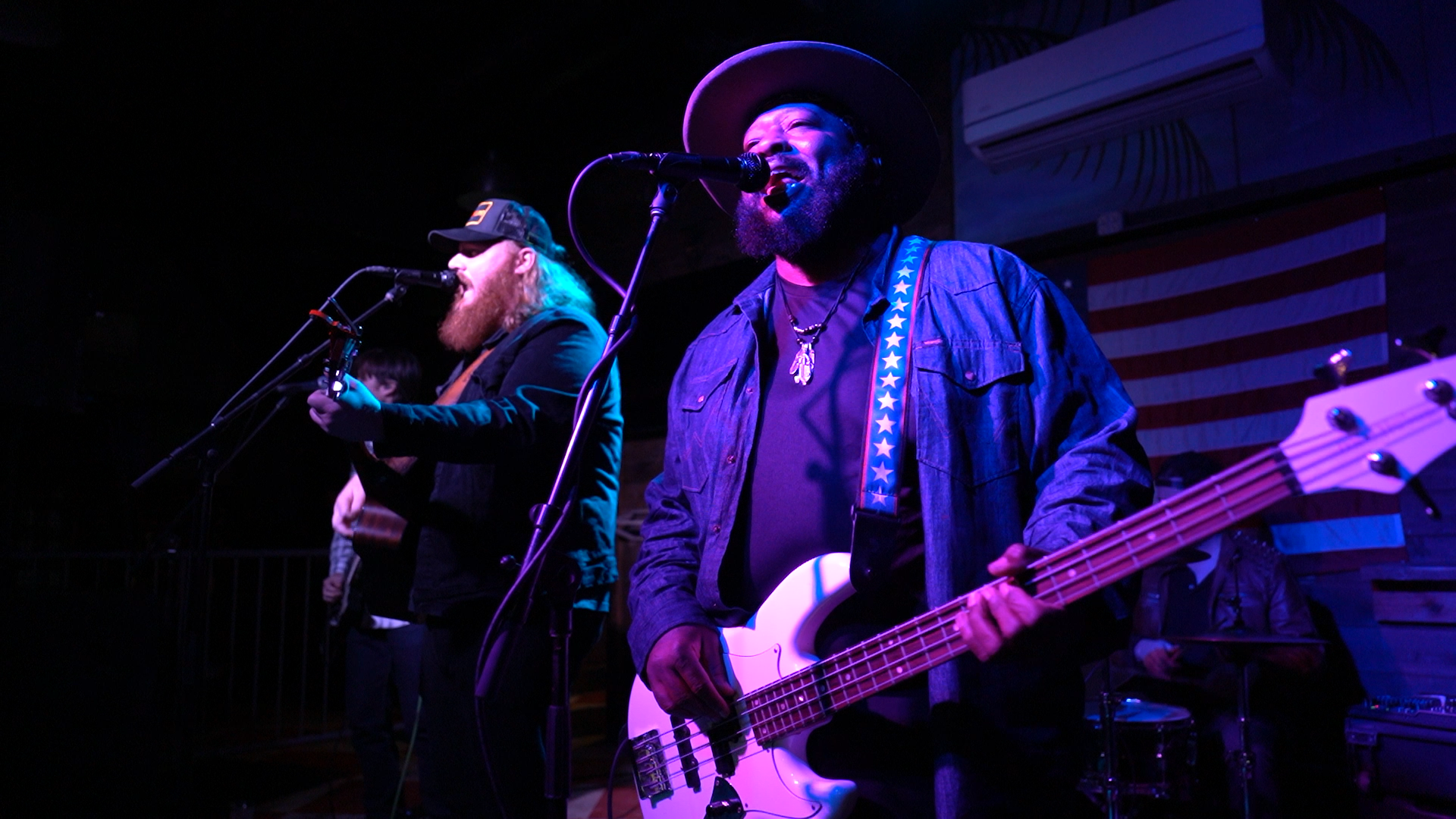
- Neon Union performing at Red's Ice House, November 2024

Background information
- Origin: Nashville, Tennessee, United States
- Genres: Country; Bro Country; Country Rock
- Years active: 2022–2026
- Label: Red Street Records
- Website: neonunion.music

Neon Union was an American country music duo founded in 2022 in Nashville, Tennessee. The founding members are multi-instrumentalist Leo Brooks and singer-songwriter Andrew Millsaps.

In 2022, the group signed with Red Street Records and made their debut performance at the Grand Ole Opry, opening for Jimmie Allen. Neon Union has earned their first ACM nomination for New Duo/Group of the Year, been named Billboard’s Rookie of the Month, earned performance slots with the CMA Fest and ACMs and have opened for musical acts like Scotty McCreery, Hardy and Pitbull.

The duo released their first EP, Double Wide Castle Sessions in early 2023 following their debut single, “Bout Damn Time," which was released in December 2022. Their first full-length record, Good Years, was released on January 31, 2025. In 2026, the duo announced their breakup.

== Discography ==
- Single: "Bout Damn Time" (December 2022)
- EP: Double Wide Castle Sessions (July 2023)
- Album: Good Years (January 2025)

== Honors and awards ==
Year	Association	Category	Recipient	Result
2019	Chris Austin Songwriting Competition	Best Songwriter	Andrew Millsaps	Won
2023.	Billboard Magazine	Rookie of the Month	Neon Union	Won
2024	Academy of Country Music Awards	New Duo or Group	Neon Union	Nominated
