= Tim Spencer (singer) =

American singer-songwriter (1908–1974)

- Born: Vernon Harold Spencer; July 13, 1908; Webb City, Missouri
- Died: April 26, 1974 (aged 65) Apple Valley, California
- Genres: Western music; Country music
- Occupations: Singer-songwriter; Actor
- Years active: 1933–1949
- Formerly of: Sons of the Pioneers

Vernon Harold "Tim" Spencer (July 13, 1908 – April 26, 1974) was an American singer, songwriter, and actor. Spencer is best known for founding the popular American Cowboy singing group the Sons of the Pioneers in 1933 along with Bob Nolan and Roy Rogers.

== Biography ==
Vernon Harold "Tim" Spencer was born to Edgar Ephraim Spencer and Laura Alice Hogan on July 13, 1908 in Webb City, Missouri. The family moved to New Mexico when Tim was five years old, one of eight boys and two girls. The family later moved to Picher, Oklahoma two years later. In 1931, Tim left Oklahoma for Los Angeles and began working at Safeway.

== Career ==
Spencer appeared with the Sons of the Pioneers in multiple films, and wrote many of the songs they performed. He retired from the Sons of the Pioneers in 1949, but continued managing them until 1952, and recorded with them until 1957 for RCA Victor. After leaving the group, Spencer organized a gospel music publishing company called Manna [Gaviota] Music. The company secured the rights to How Great Thou Art, which provided a solid business footing.

Tim Spencer was inducted into the Western Music Hall of Fame as an individual western music songwriter, and as a member of the Sons of the Pioneers. He was inducted into the Gospel Music Hall of Fame in 1985 and the Hall of Great Western Performers in 1995.

== Songs ==
His most popular commercial song was "Room Full of Roses", which was a country hit in 1949 and again in 1974.

- "The Everlasting Hills of Oklahoma"
- "Room Full of Roses" – recorded by Sammy Kaye, Eddy Howard, Dick Haymes, George Morgan and later Mickey Gilley
- "Ride, Ranger, Ride" recorded by Gene Autry
- "A Two Seated Saddle and a One Gaited Horse" recorded by Dale Evans
- "Cowboy Camp Meetin'"
- "Blue Prairie" with Bob Nolan
- "Ridin' the Range with You"
- "Too High, Too Wide, Too Low (You Must Come in at the Door)"

== Filmography ==
- Two-Fisted Rangers (1939)
- Man from Cheyenne (1942)
