= Reba McEntire singles discography =

Reba McEntire discography
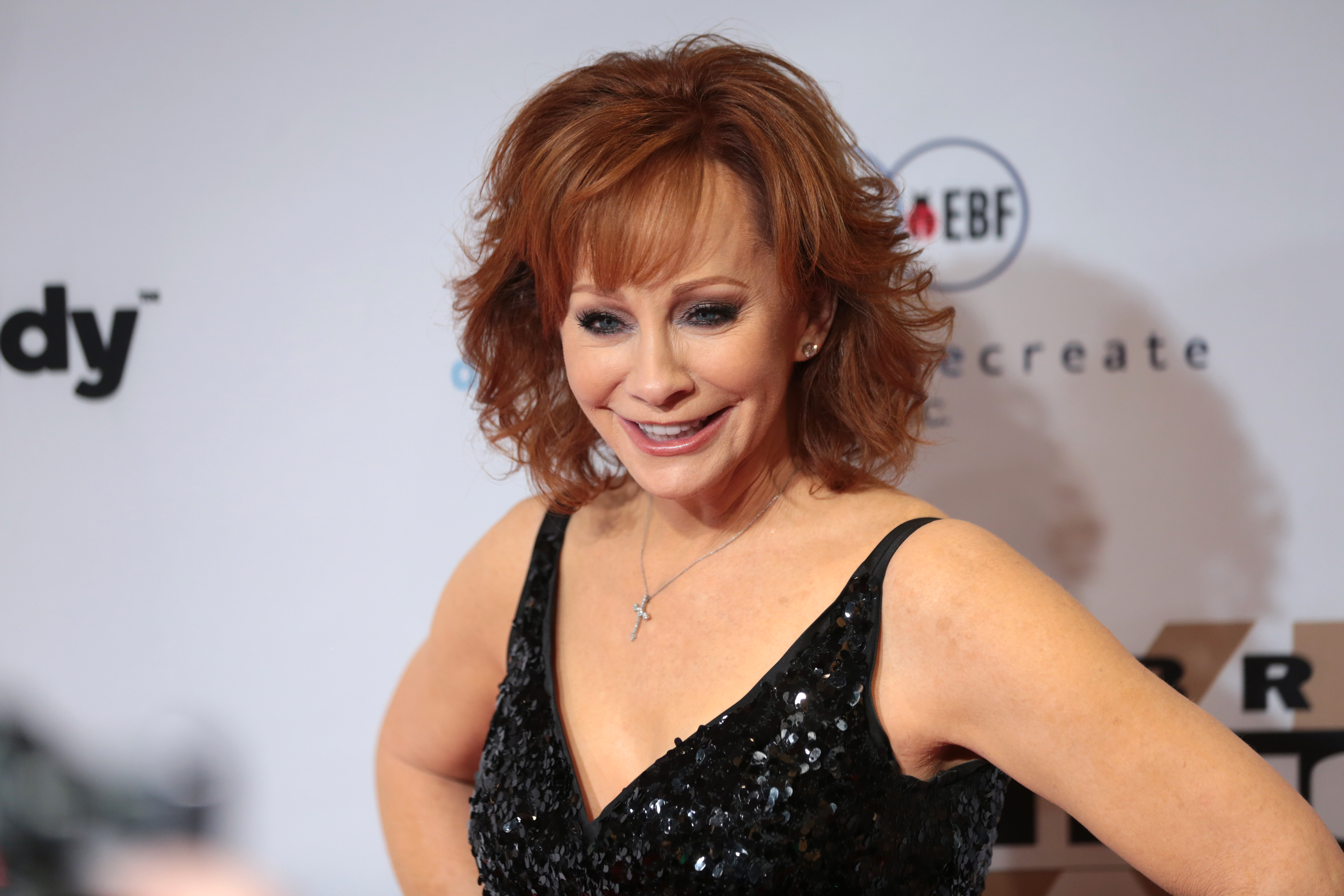
- McEntire, 2017.
- Singles: 140
- As lead artist: 105
- As featured artist: 7
- Promotional singles: 19
- Other charted songs: 9

The singles discography of American country music singer Reba McEntire contains 140 singles. They are further categorized by 105 released as a lead artist, seven as a featured artist and 19 that were issued as promotional singles. In addition to singles, nine unofficial singles were released and made charting positions in both the United States and Canada. After being discovered by Red Steagall, McEntire signed a recording contract with Polygram/Mercury Records in 1975. In 1977, she released her debut, self-titled album, which yielded four singles that were low-charting entries on the Billboard Hot Country Songs survey. She had her first major hit as a solo artist with a remake of Patsy Cline's "Sweet Dreams" (1979).

In the early 1980s, she had several more top ten country hits like "(You Lift Me) Up to Heaven" (1980), "Today All Over Again" (1981), "I'm Not That Lonely Yet" (1982). In 1983, she reached the number one spot on the Billboard country chart for the first time with the singles "Can't Even Get the Blues" and "You're the First Time I Thought About Leaving". In 1984, McEntire switched to MCA Records where she had more creative control over her music. Recording in a more traditional country style, the 1984 singles "How Blue" and "Somebody Should Leave" became her next singles to reach number one. She followed this with a series of number one country singles in both the United States and Canada during the rest of the decade. The singles were "Whoever's in New England", "Little Rock", "What Am I Gonna Do About You", "The Last One to Know", "One Promise Too Late", "Love Will Find Its Way to You", "Cathy's Clown", "I Know How He Feels" and "New Fool at an Old Game".

In 1990, McEntire's commercial success continued with the number one country singles "Rumor Has It", "You Lie" and "Walk On". The following year, an aviation accident killed several of her touring band and crew members. In the wake of the accident, McEntire released an album that spawned several more major hits. This included the Billboard number one country songs "For My Broken Heart" and "Is There Life Out There". Her covers of "Fancy" and "The Night the Lights Went Out in Georgia" also became major North American country hits. Her success continued into mid 1990s with the duets "Does He Love You" and "The Heart Won't Lie". In the second half of the decade she had a continued string of number one country hits with "The Fear of Being Alone", "How Was I to Know" and the duet "If You See Him/If You See Her".

McEntire branched out into acting and created her own television sitcom during the early 2000s. She didn't record or tour for nearly three years. In 2004, she returned to music with 2003's "I'm Gonna Take That Mountain". This was followed by 2004's "Somebody", which became her first number one hit since 1998. A collection of duet recordings spawned the number two hit with Kelly Clarkson "Because of You". In 2009, she returned with a new collection of songs including the number one single "Consider Me Gone". She entered the next decade with the number one single "Turn on the Radio" in 2011. In her 50-year career, McEntire has garnered 24 number one singles on the Billboard Hot Country Songs chart, the second most number one hits by a female artist behind Dolly Parton with 25. In addition, McEntire holds the record for the most top 10 hits by a female country artist, surpassing Parton's record. In 2020 Reba scored her 57th top 10 hit, "Be A Light", a collaboration with Thomas Rhett, Hillary Scott, Chris Tomlin and Keith Urban.

== As lead artist ==
=== 1970s ===
List of singles, with selected chart positions, showing year released and album name
Title	Year	Peak chart positions		Album
Title	Year	US Cou.	CAN Cou.	Album
"I Don't Want to Be a One Night Stand"	1976	88	—	Reba McEntire
"There's Nothing Like the Love (Between a Woman and a Man)"	1977	86	—	Reba McEntire
"Glad I Waited Just for You"	1977	88	—	Reba McEntire
"One to One"	1977	—	—	Reba McEntire
"I'd Really Love to See You Tonight" (with Jacky Ward)	1978	20 (Note: Single was released as a double A-side.)	—	Non-album singles
"Three Sheets in the Wind" (with Jacky Ward)	1978	20	—	Non-album singles
"Last Night, Every Night"	1978	28	—	Out of a Dream
"Runaway Heart"	1979	36	—	Out of a Dream
"That Makes Two of Us" (with Jacky Ward)	1979	26	—	Out of a Dream
"Sweet Dreams"	1979	19	46	Out of a Dream
"(I Still Long to Hold You) Now and Then"	1979	40	48	Out of a Dream
"—" denotes a recording that did not chart or was not released in that territory.

=== 1980s ===
List of singles, with selected chart positions, showing year released and album name
Title	Year	Peak chart positions		Album
Title	Year	US Cou.	CAN Cou.	Album
"(You Lift Me) Up to Heaven"	1980	8	22	Feel the Fire
"I Can See Forever in Your Eyes"	1980	18	33	Feel the Fire
"I Don't Think Love Ought to Be That Way"	1981	13	—	Feel the Fire
"Today All Over Again"	1981	5	8	Heart to Heart
"Only You (And You Alone)"	1981	13	—	Heart to Heart
"I'm Not That Lonely Yet"	1982	3	11	Unlimited
"Can't Even Get the Blues"	1982	1	—	Unlimited
"You're the First Time I've Thought About Leaving"	1983	1	5	Unlimited
"Why Do We Want (What We Know We Can't Have)"	1983	7	45	Behind the Scene
"There Ain't No Future in This"	1983	12	33	Behind the Scene
"Just a Little Love"	1984	5	37	Just a Little Love
"He Broke Your Memory Last Night"	1984	15	19	Just a Little Love
"How Blue"	1984	1	6	My Kind of Country
"Somebody Should Leave"	1985	1	8	My Kind of Country
"Have I Got a Deal for You"	1985	6	10	Have I Got a Deal for You
"Only in My Mind"	1985	5	6	Have I Got a Deal for You
"Whoever's in New England"	1986	1	3	Whoever's in New England
"Little Rock"	1986	1	2	Whoever's in New England
"What Am I Gonna Do About You"	1986	1	1	What Am I Gonna Do About You
"Let the Music Lift You Up"	1987	4	5	What Am I Gonna Do About You
"One Promise Too Late"	1987	1	1	What Am I Gonna Do About You
"The Last One to Know"	1987	1	2	The Last One to Know
"Love Will Find Its Way to You"	1987	1	1	The Last One to Know
"Sunday Kind of Love"	1988	5	9	Reba
"I Know How He Feels"	1988	1	1	Reba
"New Fool at an Old Game"	1988	1	1	Reba
"Cathy's Clown"	1989	1	1	Sweet Sixteen
"'Til Love Comes Again"	1989	4	5	Sweet Sixteen
"Little Girl"	1989	7	7	Sweet Sixteen
"—" denotes a recording that did not chart or was not released in that territory.

=== 1990s ===
List of singles, with selected chart positions, showing year released and album name
Title	Year	Peak chart positions					Certifications	Album
Title	Year	US	US Cou.	AUS	CAN Cou.	UK	Certifications	Album
"Walk On"	1990	—	2	—	1	—		Sweet Sixteen
"You Lie"	1990	—	1	—	1	—		Rumor Has It
"Rumor Has It"	1990	—	3	—	1	—		Rumor Has It
"Fancy"	1991	—	8	—	8	—	RIAA: 3× Platinum	Rumor Has It
"Fallin' Out of Love"	1991	—	2	—	1	—		Rumor Has It
"For My Broken Heart"	1991	—	1	—	1	—		For My Broken Heart
"Is There Life Out There"	1992	—	1	—	1	—	RIAA: Gold	For My Broken Heart
"The Night the Lights Went Out in Georgia"	1992	—	12	—	7	—	RIAA: 2× Platinum	For My Broken Heart
"The Greatest Man I Never Knew"	1992	—	3	—	1	—		For My Broken Heart
"Take It Back"	1992	—	5	—	1	—		It's Your Call
"The Heart Won't Lie" (with Vince Gill)	1993	—	1	—	1	—	RIAA: Gold	It's Your Call
"It's Your Call"	1993	— (Note: "It's Your Call" did not enter the Billboard Hot 100, but peaked at number 10 on the Bubbling Under Hot 100 Singles.)	5	—	5	—		It's Your Call
"Does He Love You" (with Linda Davis)	1993	—	1	59	1	62	RIAA: Gold	Greatest Hits Volume Two
"They Asked About You"	1993	—	7	—	15	—		Greatest Hits Volume Two
"Why Haven't I Heard from You"	1994	— (Note: "Why Haven't I Heard from You" did not enter the Billboard Hot 100, but peaked at number one on the Bubbling Under Hot 100 Singles.)	5	—	4	—		Read My Mind
"She Thinks His Name Was John"	1994	— (Note: "She Thinks His Name Was John" did not enter the Billboard Hot 100, but peaked at number one on the Bubbling Under Hot 100 Singles.)	15	—	11	—		Read My Mind
"Till You Love Me"	1994	78	2	—	6	—		Read My Mind
"The Heart Is a Lonely Hunter"	1995	—	1	—	1	—		Read My Mind
"And Still"	1995	—	2	—	1	—		Read My Mind
"On My Own"	1995	—	20	—	22	—		Starting Over
"Ring on Her Finger, Time on Her Hands"	1995	—	9	—	14	—		Starting Over
"Starting Over Again"	1996	—	19	—	26	—		Starting Over
"You Keep Me Hangin' On" (Note: "You Keep Me Hangin' On" was released only to the Dance Club market. In 1996, it reached number two on the Billboard Hot Dance Music/Club Play chart.)	1996	—	—	—	—	—		Starting Over
"The Fear of Being Alone"	1996	—	2	—	1	—		What If It's You
"How Was I to Know"	1996	—	1	—	2	—		What If It's You
"I'd Rather Ride Around with You"	1997	—	2	—	2	—		What If It's You
"What If It's You"	1997	—	15	—	37	—		What If It's You
"What If"	1997	50	23	—	19	—		Non-album single
"If You See Him/If You See Her" (with Brooks & Dunn)	1998	—	1	—	1	—	RIAA: Gold	If You See Him
"Forever Love"	1998	—	4	—	4	—		If You See Him
"Wrong Night"	1998	52	6	—	6	—		If You See Him
"One Honest Heart"	1999	54	7	—	5	—		If You See Him
"What Do You Say"	1999	31	3	—	5	—		So Good Together
"—" denotes a recording that did not chart or was not released in that territory.

=== 2000s ===
List of singles, with selected chart positions, showing year released and album name
Title	Year	Peak chart positions				Certifications	Album
Title	Year	US	US Cou.	CAN	CAN Cou.	Certifications	Album
"I'll Be"	2000	51	4	—	4		So Good Together
"We're So Good Together"	2000	— (Note: "We're So Good Together" did not enter the Billboard Hot 100, but peaked at number nine on the Bubbling Under Hot 100 Singles.)	20	—	x		So Good Together
"I'm a Survivor"	2001	49	3	—	x	RIAA: Gold	Greatest Hits Volume III: I'm a Survivor
"Sweet Music Man"	2002	—	36	—	x		Greatest Hits Volume III: I'm a Survivor
"I'm Gonna Take That Mountain"	2003	— (Note: "I'm Gonna Take That Mountain" did not enter the Billboard Hot 100, but peaked at number three on the Bubbling Under Hot 100 Singles.)	14	—	x		Room to Breathe
"Somebody"	2004	35	1	—	24		Room to Breathe
"He Gets That from Me"	2004	59	7	—	12		Room to Breathe
"My Sister"	2005	93	16	—	17		Room to Breathe
"You're Gonna Be (Always Loved by Me)"	2005	—	33	—	—		Reba #1's
"Love Needs a Holiday"	2006	—	60	—	—		Reba #1's
"Because of You" (with Kelly Clarkson)	2007	50	2	36	1	RIAA: Platinum	Reba: Duets
"The Only Promise That Remains" (with Justin Timberlake)	2007	— (Note: "The Only Promise That Remains" did not enter the Billboard Hot 100, but peaked at number five on the Bubbling Under Hot 100 Singles.)	—	—	—		Reba: Duets
"Every Other Weekend" (with Kenny Chesney or Skip Ewing) (Note: The album version of "Every Other Weekend" features Kenny Chesney, while the radio edit features Skip Ewing instead. Both Chesney and Ewing are credited on the March 8, 2008, Hot Country Songs chart, and only McEntire from the March 15, 2008, chart onward.)	2008	— (Note: "Every Other Weekend" did not enter the Hot 100, but peaked at number 4 on Bubbling Under Hot 100 Singles.)	15	—	16		Reba: Duets
"Strange"	2009	76	11	92	11		Keep On Loving You
"Consider Me Gone"	2009	38	1	52	1	RIAA: Platinum	Keep On Loving You
"—" denotes a recording that did not chart or was not released in that territory "x" indicates that no relevant chart existed or was archived

=== 2010s ===
List of singles, with selected chart positions, showing year released and album name
Title	Year	Peak chart positions						Certifications	Album
Title	Year	US	US Coun.	US Cou. Air.	US Chr.	CAN	CAN Cou.	Certifications	Album
"I Keep On Loving You"	2010	78	7		—	97	6		Keep On Loving You
"Turn On the Radio"	2010	53	1		—	67	1	RIAA: Gold	All the Women I Am
"If I Were a Boy"	2011	— (Note: "If I Were a Boy" did not enter the Billboard Hot 100, but peaked at number 23 on the Bubbling Under Hot 100 Singles.)	22		—	—	27		All the Women I Am
"When Love Gets a Hold of You"	2011	—	40		—	—	45		All the Women I Am
"Somebody's Chelsea"	2011	—	44		—	—	—		All the Women I Am
"Going Out Like That"	2015	— (Note: "Going Out Like That" did not enter the Billboard Hot 100, but peaked at number two on the Bubbling Under Hot 100 Singles.)	23	28	—	85	37	RIAA: Gold	Love Somebody
"Until They Don't Love You"	2015	—	—	48	—	—	—		Love Somebody
"Just Like Them Horses"	2016	—	37	—	—	—	—		Love Somebody
"Softly and Tenderly" (featuring Kelly Clarkson and Trisha Yearwood)	2016	—	—	—	43	—	—		Sing It Now: Songs of Faith & Hope
"Back to God"	2017	— (Note: "Back to God" did not enter the Billboard Hot 100, but peaked at number two on the Bubbling Under Hot 100 Singles.)	25	41	1 (Note: Lauren Daigle was credited as a featured vocalist on Hot Christian Songs; all other formats credit only McEntire.)	—	—		Sing It Now: Songs of Faith & Hope
"God and My Girlfriends"	2017	—	—	53	32	—	—		Sing It Now: Songs of Faith & Hope
"Freedom"	2019	—	—	52	—	—	—		Stronger Than the Truth
"—" denotes a recording that did not chart or was not released in that territory.

=== 2020s ===
List of singles, with selected chart positions, showing year released and album name
Title	Year	Peak chart positions		Album
Title	Year	US Cou.	US Cou. Air.	Album
"Does He Love You" (featuring Dolly Parton)	2021	47	49	Revived Remixed Revisited
"Seven Minutes in Heaven"	2023	42	—	Not That Fancy
"I Can't"	2024	49	—	Non-album singles
"Happy's Place Theme Song"	2024	—	—	Non-album singles
"Trailblazer" (with Lainey Wilson and Miranda Lambert)	2025	44	—	Non-album singles
"Ring Ring"	2026	—	—	Non-album singles
"—" denotes a recording that did not chart or was not released in that territory.

== As a featured artist ==
List of singles, with selected chart positions, showing year released and album name
Title	Year	Peak chart positions					Certifications	Album
Title	Year	US	US Cou.	US Cou. Air.	CAN	CAN Cou.	Certifications	Album
"Mind Your Own Business" (Note: This song was only credited to Hank Williams Jr. on the 45 single and during its chart run. Therefore, it does not count towards McEntire's Billboard Hot Country Songs total.) (Hank Williams, Jr. with Reverend Ike, Reba McEntire, Willie Nelson, and Tom Petty)	1986	—	1		—	1		Montana Cafe
"Oklahoma Swing" (Vince Gill with Reba McEntire)	1990	—	13		—	7		When I Call Your Name
"Cowgirls Don't Cry" (Brooks & Dunn with Reba McEntire)	2008	44	2		49	1	RIAA: 2× Platinum	#1's...and Then Some
"The Choice" (credited as Billy Gilman & Friends)	2012	—	—	—	—	—		Non-album singles
"Forever Country" (credited as Artists of Now, Then & Forever)	2016	21	1	33	25	34	RIAA: Gold	Non-album singles
"Be a Light" (Thomas Rhett featuring Reba McEntire, Hillary Scott, Chris Tomlin, and Keith Urban)	2020	42	7	2	74	3	RIAA: Platinum	Non-album singles
"Dear Rodeo" (Cody Johnson featuring Reba McEntire)	2020	—	44	34	—	49	RIAA: Platinum	Ain't Nothin' to It
"Light of a Clear Blue Morning" (Dolly Parton featuring Lainey Wilson, Miley Cyrus, Queen Latifah and Reba McEntire)	2026	—	—	41	—	—		Non-album single
"—" denotes a recording that did not chart or was not released in that territory.

== Promotional singles ==
List of singles, with selected chart positions, showing year released and album name
Title	Year	Peak chart positions				Album
Title	Year	US	US Cou.	US Chr.	CAN Cou.	Album
"The Christmas Song (Chestnuts Roasting on an Open Fire)"	1987	—	63	—	—	Merry Christmas to You
"I'll Be Home for Christmas"	1988	—	68	—	—	Merry Christmas to You
"The New Me" (from Malibu Country)	2012	—	—	—	—	Non-album singles
"Goodbye Looks Good on Me" (Theme from Malibu Country)	2012	—	—	—	—	Non-album singles
"Pray for Peace"	2014	—	—	—	—	Love Somebody
"Enough" (featuring Jennifer Nettles)	2015	—	—	—	—	Love Somebody
"Livin' Ain't Killed Me Yet"	2015	—	—	—	—	Love Somebody
"Hallelujah, Amen"	2016	—	—	—	—	Sing It Now: Songs of Faith & Hope
"Oh, How I Love Jesus"	2016	—	—	—	—	Sing It Now: Songs of Faith & Hope
"Oh Happy Day"	2017	—	—	—	—	Sing It Now: Songs of Faith & Hope
"Sing It Now"	2017	—	—	24	—	Sing It Now: Songs of Faith & Hope
"Stronger Than the Truth"	2019	—	—	—	—	Stronger Than the Truth
"No U in Oklahoma"	2019	—	—	—	—	Stronger Than the Truth
"In His Mind"	2019	—	—	—	—	Stronger Than the Truth
"Tammy Wynette Kind of Pain"	2019	—	—	—	—	Stronger Than the Truth
"Storm in a Shot Glass"	2019	—	—	—	—	Stronger Than the Truth
"In the Ghetto" (with Darius Rucker)	2020	—	—	—	—	Non-album singles
"Somehow You Do"	2021	—	—	—	—	Non-album singles
"—" denotes a recording that did not chart or was not released in that territory.

== Other charted songs ==
List of singles, with selected chart positions, showing year released and album name
Title	Year	Peak chart positions					Album
Title	Year	US Cou.	US Cou. Air.	US Chr.	CAN Cou.	CAN AC	Album
"If I Had Only Known"	1994	72		—	64	—	8 Seconds
"Away in a Manger"	1999	73		—	—	—	Merry Christmas to You
"I'm Not Your Girl"	1999	75		—	—	—	So Good Together
"'Til I Said It to You"	1999	70		—	—	—	So Good Together
"The Secret of Giving"	1999	58		—	—	—	The Secret of Giving: A Christmas Collection
"I Saw Mommy Kissing Santa Claus"	1999	50		—	—	—	The Secret of Giving: A Christmas Collection
"Silent Night" (with Kelly Clarkson and Trisha Yearwood)	2013	39	51	—	—	49	Wrapped in Red
"Amazing Grace"	2017	—	—	45	—	—	Sing It Now: Songs of Faith & Hope
"—" denotes a recording that did not chart or was not released in that territory.
