= Reba McEntire albums discography =

Reba McEntire discography
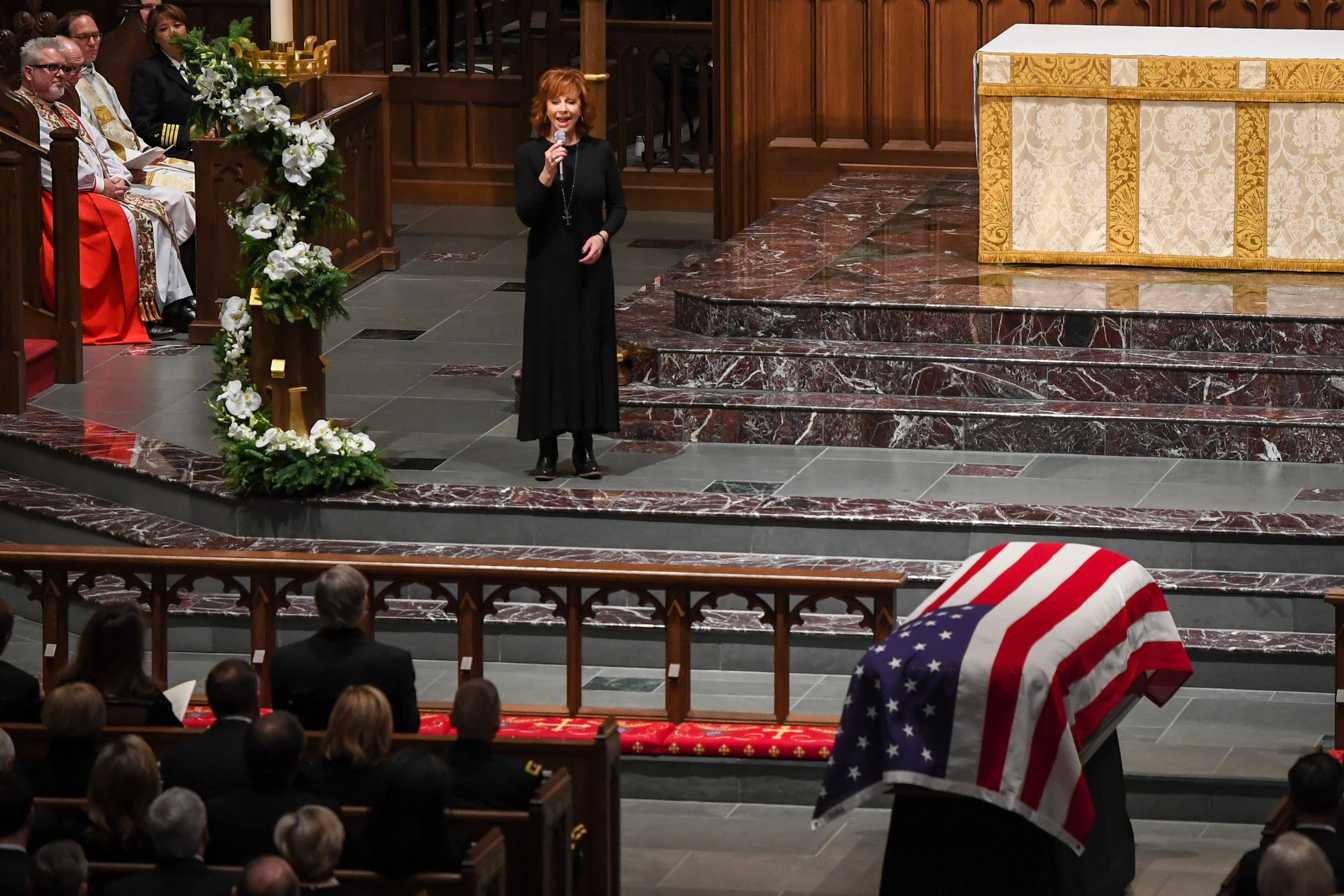
- Reba McEntire performing at the funeral of George H. W. Bush, 2018.
- Studio albums: 32
- Extended plays: 3
- Live albums: 2
- Compilation albums: 26
- Other album appearances: 28

The albums discography of American country singer Reba McEntire contains 32 studio albums, 26 compilation albums, two live albums, three extended plays and has appeared on 28 albums. Of these albums, 27 have received a certification of at least Gold from the Recording Industry Association of America. Her highest-certified album is the 1993 compilation Greatest Hits Volume Two, which is certified quintuple-platinum for U.S. shipments of five million copies. According to RIAA, she has sold 41 million certified albums in the United States, making her the eighth best selling female album artist in the United States.

Widely recognized as the "Queen of Country" by various media outlets, she has sold an estimated 90 million records worldwide throughout her career, making her the 2nd best selling female country artist in history. Country Music Hall of Fame hailed McEntire as "the most successful female country performer of her generation". She has scored 13 number one albums on Billboard's Top Country Albums, one of the most by any country artist ever. Rolling Stone listed her as the 36th Greatest Country Artist of all time. Billboard also listed her as the 44th Top Country Artist of the 2010s.

== Studio albums ==
=== 1970s–1980s ===
List of studio albums and selected chart positions, showing other relevant details
Title	Album details	Peak chart positions			Certifications
Title	Album details	US	US Cou.	CAN Cou.	Certifications
Reba McEntire	Released: August 15, 1977; Label: PolyGram/Mercury; Formats: LP, cassette	—	—	—	
Out of a Dream	Released: August 27, 1979; Label: PolyGram/Mercury; Formats: LP, cassette	—	—	—	
Feel the Fire	Released: October 6, 1980; Label: PolyGram/Mercury; Formats: LP, cassette	—	—	—	
Heart to Heart	Released: August 17, 1981; Label: PolyGram/Mercury; Formats: LP, cassette	—	42	—	
Unlimited	Released: June 14, 1982; Label: PolyGram/Mercury; Formats: LP, cassette	—	22	—	
Behind the Scene	Released: August 15, 1983; Label: PolyGram/Mercury; Formats: LP, cassette	—	36	—	
Just a Little Love	Released: April 2, 1984; Label: MCA; Formats: LP, cassette	—	24	—	
My Kind of Country	Released: October 15, 1984; Label: MCA; Formats: LP, cassette	—	13	—	RIAA: Gold
Have I Got a Deal for You	Released: June 10, 1985; Label: MCA; Formats: LP, cassette	—	27	—	RIAA: Gold
Whoever's in New England	Released: February 10, 1986; Label: MCA; Formats: CD, LP, cassette	—	1	—	RIAA: Platinum
What Am I Gonna Do About You	Released: October 6, 1986; Label: MCA; Formats: CD, LP, cassette	—	1	—	RIAA: Gold
The Last One to Know	Released: September 7, 1987; Label: MCA; Formats: CD, LP, cassette	102	3	—	RIAA: Platinum
Merry Christmas to You	Released: November 27, 1987; Label: MCA; Formats: CD, LP, cassette	—	72	—	RIAA: 2× Platinum
Reba	Released: April 25, 1988; Label: MCA; Formats: CD, LP, cassette	118	1	—	RIAA: Platinum
Sweet Sixteen	Released: May 1, 1989; Label: MCA; Formats: CD, LP, cassette	78	1	1	RIAA: Platinum
"—" denotes a recording that did not chart or was not released in that territory.

=== 1990s ===
List of studio albums and selected chart positions, showing other relevant details
Title	Album details	Peak chart positions						Certifications
Title	Album details	US	US Cou.	AUS	CAN	CAN Cou.	UK	Certifications
Rumor Has It	Released: September 4, 1990; Label: MCA; Formats: CD, LP, cassette	39	2	29	—	—	—	MC: Platinum; RIAA: 3× Platinum
For My Broken Heart	Released: October 1, 1991; Label: MCA; Formats: CD, LP, cassette	13	3	171	78	1	—	MC: Platinum; RIAA: 4× Platinum
It's Your Call	Released: December 15, 1992; Label: MCA; Formats: CD, cassette	8	1	—	59	1	—	MC: Platinum; RIAA: 3× Platinum
Read My Mind	Released: April 26, 1994; Label: MCA; Formats: CD, cassette, lp	2	2	87	12	1	—	MC: Platinum; RIAA: 3× Platinum
Starting Over	Released: October 3, 1995; Label: MCA; Formats: CD, lp, cassette	5	1	134	34	1	—	MC: Platinum; RIAA: Platinum
What If It's You	Released: November 5, 1996; Label: MCA; Formats: Cassette, CD, lp	15	1	173	36	3	—	MC: Gold; RIAA: 2× Platinum
If You See Him	Released: June 2, 1998; Label: MCA Nashville; Formats: Cassette, CD	8	2	52	54	7	—	MC: Gold; RIAA: Platinum
The Secret of Giving: A Christmas Collection	Released: September 21, 1999; Label: MCA Nashville; Formats: CD, cassette	85	10	—	—	—	—	RIAA: Gold
So Good Together	Released: November 23, 1999; Label: MCA Nashville; Formats: Cassette, CD	28	5	124	—	9	142	RIAA: Platinum
"—" denotes a recording that did not chart or was not released in that territory.

=== 2000s ===
List of studio albums and selected chart positions, showing other relevant details
Title	Album details	Peak chart positions					Certifications
Title	Album details	US	US Cou.	AUS	CAN	UK	Certifications
Room to Breathe	Released: November 18, 2003; Label: MCA Nashville; Formats: Cassette, CD	25	4	176	—	—	RIAA: Platinum
Reba: Duets	Released: September 18, 2007; Label: MCA Nashville; Formats: CD, music download	1	1	86	4	127	RIAA: Platinum
Keep on Loving You	Released: August 18, 2009; Label: Starstruck/Valory; Formats: CD, music download	1	1	174	4	—	RIAA: Gold
"—" denotes a recording that did not chart or was not released in that territory.

=== 2010s ===
List of studio albums and selected chart positions, showing other relevant details
Title	Album details	Peak chart positions				Sales
Title	Album details	US	US Cou.	AUS	CAN	Sales
All the Women I Am	Released: November 9, 2010; Label: Starstruck/Valory; Formats: CD, music download	7	3	—	14	US: 347,000
Love Somebody	Released: April 14, 2015; Label: Nash Icon/Starstruck; Formats: LP, CD, music download	3	1	51	6	US: 202,000
My Kind of Christmas	Released: September 2, 2016; Label: Cracker Barrel/Nash Icon/Starstruck; Formats: LP, CD, music download	39	7	—	62	
Sing It Now: Songs of Faith & Hope	Released: February 3, 2017; Label: Capitol Christ./Nash Icon/Rockin' R; Formats: LP, CD, music download	4	1	187	23	US: 216,800
Stronger Than the Truth	Released: April 5, 2019; Label: Big Machine/Rockin' R; Formats: LP, CD, music download	22	4	106	—	US: 57,500
"—" denotes a recording that did not chart or was not released in that territory.

== Compilation albums ==
=== 1980s ===
List of compilation albums and selected chart positions, showing other relevant details
Title	Album details	Peak chart positions		Certifications
Title	Album details	US	US Cou.	Certifications
The Best of Reba McEntire	Released: February 1985; Label: PolyGram/Mercury; Formats: CD, LP, cassette	—	29	RIAA: Gold
Reba Nell McEntire	Released: February 10, 1986; Label: Mercury; Formats: CD, LP, cassette	—	40	
Reba McEntire's Greatest Hits	Released: 1987; Label: MCA; Formats: CD, LP, cassette	139	2	MC: Platinum; RIAA: 3× Platinum
Forever in Your Eyes	Released: 1988; Label: PolyGram/Mercury; Formats: Cassette	—	—	
"—" denotes a recording that did not chart or was not released in that territory.

=== 1990s ===
List of compilation albums and selected chart positions, showing other relevant details
Title	Album details	Peak chart positions						Certifications
Title	Album details	US	US Cou.	AUS	CAN	CAN Cou.	UK	Certifications
My Kind of Country	Released: 1990; Label: MCA; Formats: CD	—	—	—	—	—	—	
The Best of Reba McEntire	Released: 1992; Label: PolyGram Special Markets; Formats: CD, cassette	—	—	—	—	—	—	
You Lift Me Up to Heaven	Released: April 28, 1992; Label: PolyGram/Mercury; Formats: CD, cassette	—	—	—	—	—	—	
Greatest Hits Volume Two	Released: September 28, 1993; Label: MCA; Formats: CD, cassette	5	1	200	39	9	—	MC: 2× Platinum; RIAA: 5× Platinum
All Time Favorites	Released: 1994; Label: PolyGram Special Markets; Formats: Cassette	—	—	—	—	—	—	
Best of the Early Years	Released: 1994; Label: PolyGram Special Markets; Formats: CD, Cassette	—	—	—	—	—	—	
Oklahoma Girl	Released: October 1994; Label: Mercury; Formats: CD, cassette	—	—	—	—	—	—	
Forever Reba	Released: 1998; Label: Universal; Formats: CD	—	—	—	—	—	—	
Moments and Memories: The Best of Reba	Released: March 18, 1998; Label: MCA Nashville; Formats: CD, cassette	—	—	14	35	3	137	ARIA: Gold
I'll Be	Released: October 9, 2000; Label: MCA Nashville; Formats: CD	—	—	—	—	—	134	
"—" denotes a recording that did not chart or was not released in that territory.

=== 2000s ===
List of compilation albums and selected chart positions, showing other relevant details
Title	Album details	Peak chart positions				Certifications
Title	Album details	US	US Cou.	AUS	CAN	Certifications
Greatest Hits Volume III: I'm a Survivor	Released: October 23, 2001; Label: MCA Nashville; Formats: CD, cassette	18	1	—	—	RIAA: Gold
20th Century Masters: The Christmas Collection	Released: September 23, 2003; Label: MCA Nashville; Formats: CD	—	67	—	79	
Love Collection	Released: February 15, 2005; Label: Madacy; Formats: CD	—	—	—	—	
Christmas Collection	Released: August 30, 2005; Label: Madacy; Formats: CD	—	—	—	—	
Reba #1's	Released: November 22, 2005; Label: MCA Nashville; Formats: CD	12	3	178	—	RIAA: 2× Platinum
My Best to You	Released: July 18, 2006; Label: Madacy; Formats: CD	—	—	—	—	
20th Century Masters: The Millennium Collection	Released: March 13, 2007; Label: MCA Nashville; Formats: CD, music download	—	45	—	—	
Love Revival	Released: January 2, 2008; Label: Hallmark/MCA Nashville; Formats: CD	—	—	—	—	RIAA: Gold
Christmas & Hits Duos	Released: October 21, 2008; Label: MCA Nashville/Verve; Formats: CD	—	—	—	—	
50 Greatest Hits	Released: October 28, 2008; Label: MCA Nashville; Formats: CD, music download	—	41	—	—	
"—" denotes a recording that did not chart or was not released in that territory.

=== 2010s ===
List of compilation albums and selected chart positions, showing other relevant details
Title	Album details	Peak chart positions	
Title	Album details	US Cou.	CAN
5 Classic Albums	Released: November 11, 2013; Label: MCA Nashville; Formats: CD	—	—
Icon	Released: August 5, 2014; Label: MCA Nashville; Formats: CD, LP	38	24
"—" denotes a recording that did not chart or was not released in that territory.

=== 2020s ===
List of compilation albums and selected chart positions, showing other relevant details
Title	Album details	Peak chart positions	
Title	Album details	US	US Cou.
Women to the Front: Reba	Released: March 5, 2021; Label: Universal; Formats: Music download	—	—
Revived Remixed Revisited	Released: October 8, 2021; Label: MCA Nashville; Formats: LP, CD, music download	91	12
My Chains Are Gone: Hymns & Gospel Favorites	Released: March 25, 2022; Label: MCA Nashville / Rockin' R; Formats: CD, DVD, music download	77	9
Not That Fancy	Released: October 6, 2023; Label: MCA Nashville; Formats: LP, CD, music download	122	25
The Hits	Released: October 31, 2025; Label: MCA Nashville; Formats: LP	—	—
"—" denotes a recording that did not chart or was not released in that territory.

== Live albums ==
List of live albums and selected chart positions, showing other relevant details
Title	Album details	Peak chart positions		Certifications
Title	Album details	US	US Cou.	Certifications
Reba Live	Released: August 30, 1989; Label: MCA Nashville; Formats: CD, LP, cassette	124	2	RIAA: Platinum
South Pacific: In Concert from Carnegie Hall (with Alec Baldwin and Brian Stokes Mitchell)	Released: April 18, 2006; Label: Decca Broadway; Formats: CD, music download	—	—	
"—" denotes a recording that did not chart or was not released in that territory.

== Extended plays ==
List of EPs, with other relevant details
Title	Extended play details
Exclusive Collector's Edition (with Brooks & Dunn)	Released: June 2, 1998; Label: Arista Nashville/MCA Nashville; Formats: CD
Comfort from a Country Quilt	Released: April 13, 1999; Label: Universal Special Markets; Formats: CD
Whirlpool Presents Reba Live	Released: 2004; Label: MCA Nashville; Formats: CD

== Other album appearances ==
List of non-single guest appearances, with other performing artists, showing year released and album name
Title	Year	Other artist(s)	Album	Ref.
"Amazing Grace"	1994	The Maverick Choir	Maverick (soundtrack)	
"Bonanza"	1994	Dan Aykroyd	North (soundtrack)	
"Since I Fell for You"	1994	Natalie Cole	Rhythm, Country and Blues	
"If I Could Only Be Like You"	1995	Susie Luchsinger	Come as You Are	
"God You Never Cried"	1995	Susie Luchsinger	Come as You Are	
"If I Could Live Your Life"	1996	Linda Davis	Some Things Are Meant to Be	
"You Keep Me Hangin' On" (Dance Mix)	1996	none	Today's Hottest Country Dance Remixes	
"Please Be the One"	1998	none	The Prince of Egypt: Nashville (soundtrack)	
"Right or Wrong"	1999	Asleep at the Wheel	Ride with Bob	
"Silent Night"	2003	none	A Very Special Acoustic Christmas	
"I Was Country When Country Wasn't Cool"	2006	Kenny Chesney	She Was Country When Country Wasn't Cool: A Tribute to Barbara Mandrell	
"I Say a Little Prayer"	2006	Dionne Warwick	My Friends & Me	
"Good Doggy, No Bone!"	2006	none	The Fox and the Hound 2 (soundtrack)	
"Here We Go Again"	2007	Red Steagall	Here We Go Again	
"Islands in the Stream"	2008	Barry Manilow	The Greatest Songs of the Eighties	
"Blue Christmas"	2009	Andrea Bocelli	My Christmas	
"If You're Not Gone Too Long"	2010	The Time Jumpers	Coal Miner's Daughter: A Tribute to Loretta Lynn	
"I'll Be Home for Christmas"	2012	none	Big Machine Records Presents: The Country Christmas Collection	
"Oklahoma Christmas"	2012	Blake Shelton	Cheers, It's Christmas	
"How Blue"	2013	Terri Clark	Classic	
"Silent Night"	2013	Kelly Clarkson; Trisha Yearwood	Wrapped in Red	
"Look for the Light"	2016	none	The Best Songs from the Land Before Time	
"Me and Bobby McGee"	2017	none	The Life & Songs of Kris Kristofferson	
"Why Me"	2017	none	The Life & Songs of Kris Kristofferson	
"I'm a Woman"	2019	Kristin Chenoweth; Jennifer Hudson	For the Girls	
"Redhead"	2020	Caylee Hammack	If It Wasn't for You	
"Still Woman Enough"	2021	Loretta Lynn; Carrie Underwood	Still Woman Enough	
"Girls Night Out"	2023	Carly Pearce; Jennifer Nettles; Gabby Barrett	A Tribute to The Judds	
