= The Best of Reba McEntire =

Greatest hits album by Reba McEntire
- Released: February 1985
- Genre: Country
- Length: 28:08
- Label: Mercury
- Producer: Jerry Kennedy

Reba McEntire chronology
My Kind of Country (1984)	The Best of Reba McEntire (1985)	Have I Got a Deal for You (1985)

Professional ratings
Review scores
Source	Rating
Allmusic	4.5/5 stars

Mercury Records released The Best of Reba McEntire in 1985 after McEntire had left the label for MCA. It includes two number one singles along with her more minor hits while on the label.

== Track listing ==
No.	Title	Writer(s)	Length
1.	"(You Lift Me) Up to Heaven"	Johnny MacRae, Bob Morrison, Bill Zerface, Jim Zerface	2:49
2.	"There Ain't No Future in This"	Bill Rice, Sharon Vaughn	2:35
3.	"I Don't Think Love Ought to Be That Way"	Richard Mainegra, Layng Martine Jr.	2:41
4.	"Only You (And You Alone)"	Buck Ram, Ande Rand	2:50
5.	"I'm Not That Lonely Yet"	Rice, Vaughn	2:45
6.	"Can't Even Get the Blues No More"	Rick Carnes, Tom Damphier	2:27
7.	"Today All Over Again"	Lola Jean Dillon, Bobby Harden	3:16
8.	"Why Do We Want (What We Know We Can't Have)"	Don King, Dave Woodward	2:39
9.	"My Turn"	Len Chera, Jay Huguely	3:17
10.	"You're the First Time I've Thought About Leaving"	Kerry Chater, Dickey Lee	2:52

== Chart performance ==
=== Album ===
Chart (1985)	Peak position
U.S. Billboard Top Country Albums	29

=== Certifications/sales ===
Region	Certification	Certified units/sales
United States (RIAA)	Gold	500,000^{^}
^{^} Shipments figures based on certification alone.
