= Reba McEntire's Greatest Hits =

Greatest hits album by Reba McEntire
- Released: April 20, 1987
- Recorded: 1984–1987
- Genre: Country
- Length: 32:57
- Label: MCA
- Producer: Various

Reba McEntire chronology
What Am I Gonna Do About You (1986)	Reba McEntire's Greatest Hits (1987)	The Last One to Know (1987)

Alternative cover
- 1992 Reissue Cover

Professional ratings
Review scores
Source	Rating
Allmusic	5/5 stars

Reba McEntire's Greatest Hits is Reba McEntire's first compilation for MCA Records. It covers her hit singles from 1984, 1985 and 1986. No new material was recorded for the album. Greatest Hits peaked at No. 2 on the country album chart and at No. 134 on the Billboard 200. It has sold well over time and is currently certified three-times platinum by the RIAA.

== Track listing ==
No.	Title	Writer(s)	Length
1.	"Just a Little Love"	Stephen Allen Davis, Dennis Morgan	4:06
2.	"He Broke Your Memory Last Night"	Bucky Jones, Dickey Lee	2:46
3.	"How Blue"	John Moffat	2:41
4.	"Somebody Should Leave"	Harlan Howard, Chick Rains	3:33
5.	"Have I Got a Deal for You"	Michael P. Heeney, Jackson Leap	2:47
6.	"Only in My Mind"	Reba McEntire	3:41
7.	"Whoever's in New England"	Kendal Franceschi, Quentin Powers	3:23
8.	"Little Rock"	Bob DiPiero, Gerry House, Pat McManus	3:07
9.	"What Am I Gonna Do About You"	Jim Allison, Doug Gilmore, Bob Simon	3:28
10.	"One Promise Too Late"	Dave Loggins, Don Schlitz, Lisa Silver	3:25

== Charts ==
=== Weekly charts ===
Chart (1987)	Peak position
US Billboard 200	139
US Top Country Albums (Billboard)	2

=== Year-end charts ===
Chart (1987)	Position
US Top Country Albums (Billboard)	20
Chart (1988)	Position
US Top Country Albums (Billboard)	12
Chart (1989)	Position
US Top Country Albums (Billboard)	50

== Certifications and sales ==
Region	Certification	Certified units/sales
Canada (Music Canada)	Platinum	100,000^{^}
United States (RIAA)	3× Platinum	3,000,000^{^}
^{^} Shipments figures based on certification alone.
