= Oklahoma Girl =

Compilation album by Reba McEntire
- Released: October 1994
- Genre: Country
- Length: 1:56:08
- Label: Mercury
- Producer: Kira Florita; Hazel Smith

Reba McEntire chronology
Read My Mind (1994)	Oklahoma Girl (1994)	Starting Over (1995)

Professional ratings
Review scores
Source	Rating
Allmusic	4/5 stars

Oklahoma Girl is a compilation album by American country music singer Reba McEntire. It was released in October 1994, by Mercury Records. The tracks included are primarily minor hits released before she became a superstar in the 1980s and 1990s on MCA Records. No new material was recorded for this compilation, although seven previously unreleased songs from McEntire were found on the compilation. This compilation features all her solo Mercury singles except "Glad I Waited Just for You" and "One to One".

== Track listing ==
Disc one
No.	Title	Writer(s)	Length
1.	"I Don't Want To Be a One Night Stand"	Layng Martine Jr.	2:58
2.	"A Cowboy Like You"	Tompall Glaser	2:12
3.	"(There's Nothing Like The Love) Between a Woman and a Man"	Ruby Hice; Danny Hice	2:55
4.	"Right Time of the Night"	Peter McCann	2:34
5.	"Invitation to the Blues"	Roger Miller	3:28
6.	"Last Night, Ev'ry Night"	Bob Morrison; Jim Zerface; Bill Zerface	2:59
7.	"Runaway Heart"	Paul Harrison	2:58
8.	"(I Still Long To Hold You) Now and Then"	Jerry Fuller	2:31
9.	"Daddy"	Reba McEntire	3:04
10.	"The Blues Don't Care Who's Got 'Em"	Wayland Holyfield; Dickey Lee	3:12
11.	"Sweet Dreams"	Don Gibson	2:59
12.	"My Heart Has a Mind of Its Own"	Howard Greenfield; Jack Keller	2:23
13.	"I'm a Woman"	Jerry Leiber; Mike Stoller	3:47
14.	"I Don't Think Love Oughta Be That Way"	Martine Jr.; Richard Mainegra	2:40
15.	"(You Lift Me) Up to Heaven"	Morrison; B. Zerface; J. Zerface; Johnny MacRae	2:43
16.	"Tears on My Pillow"	Sylvester Bradford; Al Lewis	2:33
17.	"Empty Arms"	Ivory Joe Hunter	3:08
18.	"Suddenly There's a Valley"	Biff Jones; Chuck Meyer	3:29
19.	"I Can See Forever in Your Eyes"	Bob DiPiero	2:43
20.	"A Poor Man's Roses (Or a Rich Man's Gold)"	Milton DeLugg; Bob Hilliard	2:50

Disc two
No.	Title	Writer(s)	Length
1.	"Waitin' for the Sun to Shine"	Sonny Throckmorton	2:35
2.	"How Does It Feel to Be Free"	Stewart Harris; Keith Stegall	3:21
3.	"Small Two-Bedroom Starter"	Mitch Johnson; Harry Shannon	3:07
4.	"Lovin' You, Lovin' Me"	Throckmorton	2:50
5.	"Only You (And You Alone)"	Buck Ram	2:50
6.	"Today All Over Again"	Dean Dillon; Bobby Harden	3:18
7.	"Heart"	Jack Conrad; Pamela Philips	2:58
8.	"I'm Not That Lonely Yet"	Bill Rice; Sharon Vaughn	2:41
9.	"Old Man River (I've Come to Talk Again)"	Danny Hogan; Ronny Scaife	3:31
10.	"Whoever's Watchin'"	Gary Morris; Kevin Welch	2:47
11.	"Can't Even Get the Blues"	Rick Carnes; Tom Damphier	2:31
12.	"You're the First Time I've Thought About Leaving"	Lee; Kerry Chater	3:01
13.	"Muddy Mississippi"	Johnny Bernard; Julie Jones	3:28
14.	"Reasons"	McEntire	2:07
15.	"She Came on Like Lightnin'"	Paul Evans, Jerry Holland	3:20
16.	"One Good Reason"	DiPiero; MacRae	3:02
17.	"Why Do We Want (What We Know We Can't Have)"	Don King; Dave Woodward	2:38
18.	"Pins and Needles"	R. Carnes; Janis Carnes; Chip Hardy	2:16
19.	"We'll Waltz in Love Tonight"	MacRae; Morrison; Tom Davey	3:30
20.	"There Ain't No Future in This"	B. Rice; M. S. Rice	2:31
