= Revived Remixed Revisited =

Compilation album / remix album by Reba McEntire
- Released: October 8, 2021
- Length: 114:29
- Label: MCA Nashville
- Producers: Dave Cobb; Tony Brown; Doug Sisemore; Reba McEntire

Reba McEntire chronology
Stronger Than the Truth (2019)	Revived Remixed Revisited (2021)	My Chains Are Gone (2022)

Singles from Revived Remixed Revisited
- 1. "Does He Love You (Revisited)" Released: October 8, 2021

Revived Remixed Revisited is a compilation album and first remix album by American country music singer Reba McEntire. The album was released on October 8, 2021, by MCA Nashville. The album consists of three discs: Revived features ten re-recordings made with McEntire's touring band, Remixed contains ten remixes, and Revisited features ten stripped back re-recordings produced by Dave Cobb. The set was preceded by the releases of several promotional singles, and a new version of "Does He Love You" with Dolly Parton was issued to country radio as the lead-off single and charted in the top 50 of the Billboard Hot Country Songs and Country Airplay charts.

== Track listing ==
Disc 1: Revived
No.	Title	Writer(s)	Length
1.	"Can't Even Get the Blues"	Tom Damphier; Rick Carnes	3:10
2.	"Is There Life Out There"	Susan Longacre; Rick Giles	3:33
3.	"The Greatest Man I Never Knew"	Richard Leigh; Layng Martine Jr.	3:11
4.	"Walk On"	Steve Dean; Lonnie Williams	4:09
5.	"Whoever's in New England"	Kendal Franceschi; Quentin Powers	3:21
6.	"The Night the Lights Went Out in Georgia"	Bobby Russell	3:51
7.	"For My Broken Heart"	Keith Palmer; Liz Hengber	3:38
8.	"Take It Back / Why Haven't I Heard from You"	Kirsty Jackson; Sandy Knox; T. W. Hale	3:43
9.	"You Lie"	Bobby Fischer; Charlie Black; Austin Roberts	4:17
10.	"Fancy"	Bobbie Gentry	4:49

Disc 2: Remixed
No.	Title	Writer(s)	Length
1.	"Turn on the Radio" (Tracy Young remix)	Mark Oakley; Cherie Oakley; J. P. Twang	3:32
2.	"I'm Gonna Take That Mountain" (Dave Audé remix)	Jerry Salley; Melissa Peirce	3:46
3.	"Little Rock" (StoneBridge remix)	Pat McManus; Bob DiPiero; Gerry House	3:38
4.	"I'm a Survivor" (Lafemmebear remix)	Shelby Kennedy; Philip White	2:47
5.	"Does He Love You" (duet with Linda Davis) (Eric Kupper remix)	Sandy Knox; Billy Stritch	5:05
6.	"You Keep Me Hangin' On" (Classic Paradise radio mix)	Brian Holland; Lamont Dozier; Eddie Holland	3:46
7.	"The Night the Lights Went Out in Georgia" (Eric Kupper remix)	Russell	5:04
8.	"The Heart Is a Lonely Hunter" (Ralphi Rosario remix)	Mark D. Sanders; Kim Williams; Ed Hill	3:46
9.	"Why Haven't I Heard from You" (Dave Audé remix)	Knox; Hale	3:25
10.	"Fancy" (Dave Audé remix)	Gentry	4:44

Disc 3: Revisited
No.	Title	Writer(s)	Length
1.	"The Fear of Being Alone"	Walt Aldridge; Bruce Miller	2:52
2.	"Consider Me Gone"	Steve Diamond; Marv Green	3:30
3.	"Somebody Should Leave"	Harlan Howard; Chick Rains	3:40
4.	"How Blue"	John Moffat	3:22
5.	"Does He Love You" (featuring Dolly Parton)	Knox; Stritch	4:25
6.	"One Promise Too Late"	Dave Loggins; Don Schlitz; Lisa Silver	3:34
7.	"The Last One to Know"	Matraca Berg; Jane Mariash	3:26
8.	"New Fool at an Old Game"	Steve Bogard; Rick Giles; Sheila Stephen	4:02
9.	"I'm a Survivor"	Kennedy; White	3:23
10.	"Fancy"	Gentry	4:52

== Charts ==
Chart performance for Revived Remixed Revisited
Chart (2021)	Peak position
US Billboard 200	91
US Top Country Albums (Billboard)	12
