= What Am I Gonna Do =

What Am I Gonna Do may refer to

- "What Am I Gonna Do," single by Tyrese
- "What Am I Gonna Do", single for Bobby Bare Sr, written by Carole King and Toni Stern, also a single for Kenny Rogers and the First Edition
- "What Am I Gonna Do", song by Neil Sedaka from the album Neil Sedaka Sings Little Devil and His Other Hits, written by Sedaka & Greenfield also recorded by Billy Fury
- "What Am I Gonna Do (I'm So in Love with You)", single by Rod Stewart from Body Wishes, written by Stewart, Jay Davis and Tony Brock
- "What Am I Gonna Do", song written by D. Parks, B. Edward, performed by Bucks Fizz, the B-side of "My Camera Never Lies"
- "What Am I Gonna Do?", a song by Irving Berlin
- "What Am I Gonna Do (With the Rest of My Life)" song by Merle Haggard

== See also ==
- What Am I Gonna Do About You 1986 album by Reba McEntire
- What Am I Gonna Do with You song recorded by Barry White
- What Am I Gonna Do About You (song) song written by Jim Allison, Doug Gilmore, and Bob Simon
