= You Lift Me Up to Heaven =

You Lift Me Up To Heaven

Greatest hits album by Reba McEntire
- Released: April 28, 1992
- Genre: Country
- Label: Mercury

Professional ratings
Review scores
Source	Rating
Allmusic	3/5 stars

You Lift Me Up To Heaven is a compilation album from Reba McEntire released in 1992, along with Forever In Your Eyes, featuring the 1970s and early 1980s hits "(You Lift Me) Up to Heaven", "Glad I Waited Just for You", and "You're the First Time I've Thought About Leaving". This album is currently out of print.

== Track listing ==
=== CD edition ===
No.	Title	Writer(s)	Length
1.	"(You Lift Me) Up to Heaven"	Bill Zerface; Jim Zerface; Bob Morrison; Johnny Macrae	2:46
2.	"I've Waited All My Life for You"	Jerry Foster, Bill Rice	3:00
3.	"You're the First Time I've Thought About Leaving"	Dickey Lee, Kerry Chater	2:51
4.	"One to One"	Jerry Foster, Bill Rice	2:41
5.	"Ease the Fever"	Bill Zerface; Bob Morrison; Jim Zerface	2:32
6.	"Glad I Waited Just for You"	Royce Porter, Bucky E. Jones	2:57
7.	"Old Man River (I've Come to Talk Again)"	Danny Hogan; Ronny Scaife	3:24
8.	"Don't Say Goodnight, Say Good Morning"	Pat Ryan; Wanda Mallette	3:39
9.	"I'm Not That Lonely Yet"	Bill Rice; Mary Sharon Rice	2:44
10.	"Its Gotta Be Love"	J.L. Wallace; Terry Skinner	2:44
11.	"Right Time of the Night"	Peter McCann	2:37
12.	"Why Can't He Be You"	Hank Cochran	3:35

=== Reba McEntire Vol. 1 cassette version ===
Side one
No.	Title	Writer(s)	Length
1.	"You Lift Me (Up to Heaven)"	Bill Zerface; Jim Zerface; Bob Morrison; Johnny Macrae	2:46
2.	"I've Waited All My Life for You"	Jerry Foster, Bill Rice	3:00
3.	"You're the First Time I've Thought About Leaving"	Dickey Lee; Kerry Chater	2:51
4.	"One to One"	Jerry Foster, Bill Rice	2:41

Side two
No.	Title	Writer(s)	Length
1.	"Ease the Fever"	Bill Zerface; Bob Morrison; Jim Zerface	2:32
2.	"Glad I Waited Just for You"	Royce Porter, Bucky E. Jones	2:57
3.	"Old Man River (I've Come to Talk Again)"	Danny Hogan; Ronny Scaife	3:24
4.	"Don't Say Goodnight, Say Good Morning"	Pat Ryan; Wanda Mallette	3:39
