= There Ain't No Future in This =

Single by Reba McEntire

from the album Behind the Scene
- B-side: "Reasons"
- Released: November 1983
- Genre: Country
- Length: 2:34
- Label: PolyGram/Mercury
- Songwriters: Bill Rice; Sharon Vaughn
- Producer: Jerry Kennedy

Reba McEntire singles chronology
| "Why Do We Want (What We Know We Can't Have)" (1983) | "There Ain't No Future in This" (1983) | "Just a Little Love" (1984) |

"There Ain't No Future in This" is a song written by Bill Rice and Sharon Vaughn, and recorded by American country music artist Reba McEntire. It was released in November 1983 as the second single from the album Behind the Scene. The song became a top 20 hit on the American country chart.

== Background and content ==
After several years of modest success, Reba McEntire began having more substantial country music hits with songs like "Today All Over Again" (1981) and her first number one song "Can't Even Get the Blues". In 1983, McEntire recorded several songs for her next album on PolyGram/Mercury Records, which would include "There Ain't No Future in This". The track was composed by Bill Rice and Sharon Vaughn. The song was recorded in March 1983 alongside producer Jerry Kennedy. During the same session, McEntire also cut "Why Do We Want (What We Know We Can't Have)". It was one of McEntire's final recording sessions with the label.

== Release and chart performance ==
"There Ain't No Future in This" was first released on McEntire's final album for PolyGram/Mercury titled Behind the Scene. The song was spawned as the disc's second single in November 1983. On the B-side was McEntire's self-penned "Reasons", which was also included on the album. It spent a total of 22 weeks on the Billboard Hot Country Singles chart, eventually reaching number 12 in March 1984. It became McEntire's final hit single with PolyGram Mercury before moving to MCA Records later in the year. In Canada, the song became McEntire's sixth top 40 hit on the RPM Country Tracks chart, climbing to number 33.

== Track listing ==
7" vinyl single

- "There Ain't No Future in This" – 2:34
- "Reasons" – 2:06

== Charts ==
Chart performance for "There Ain't No Future in This"
| Chart (1983–1984) | Peak position |
|---|---|
| Canada Country Songs (RPM) | 33 |
| US Hot Country Songs (Billboard) | 12 |
