= Heart to Heart (Reba McEntire album) =

Studio album by Reba McEntire
- Released: August 17, 1981
- Studios: Sound Stage Studios (Nashville, Tennessee)
- Genre: Country
- Length: 28:54
- Label: Mercury
- Producer: Jerry Kennedy

Reba McEntire chronology
Feel The Fire (1980)	Heart to Heart (1981)	Unlimited (1982)

Singles from Heart to Heart
- 1. "Today All Over Again" Released: July 1981; 2. "Only You (And You Alone)" Released: November 1981

Professional ratings
Review scores
Source	Rating
Allmusic	2.5/5 stars

Heart to Heart is the fourth studio album by American country music artist Reba McEntire. It was released via Mercury Records on August 17, 1981. The album includes the singles "Today All Over Again" and "Only You and You Alone," a cover of the doo-wop standard. Heart to Heart reached #42 on Top Country Albums.

== Track listing ==
No.	Title	Writer(s)	Length
1.	"Indelibly Blue"	Jim Peterik	3:21
2.	"Ease the Fever"	Bob Morrison, Bill Zerface, Jim Zerface	2:35
3.	"There Ain't No Love"	Pat McManus	2:24
4.	"How Does It Feel to Be Free"	Stewart Harris, Keith Stegall	3:21
5.	"Only You (And You Alone)"	Buck Ram	2:50
6.	"Today All Over Again"	Bobby Harden, Lola Jean Dillon	3:16
7.	"Gonna Love Ya (Till the Cows Come Home)"	Rick Carnes, Susan Drake	2:50
8.	"Who?"	Carnes, Chip Hardy	2:19
9.	"Small Two-Bedroom Starter"	Harry Shannon, Mitch Johnson	3:03
10.	"Love by Love"	B. Zerface, J. Zerface, Morrison, Johnny MacRae	2:59

== Personnel ==
- Reba McEntire – lead vocals, backing vocals
- Hargus "Pig" Robbins – keyboards, acoustic piano
- Ray Edenton – guitars
- Gordon Kennedy – guitars
- Pete Wade – guitars
- Chip Young – guitars
- Weldon Myrick – steel guitar
- Mike Leech – bass
- Jerry Carrigan – drums
- Tom Brannon – backing vocals
- Yvonne Hodges – backing vocals
- Susie McEntire – backing vocals
- Louis Nunley – backing vocals
- Rickie Page – backing vocals
- Ricky Skaggs – backing vocals
- Bergen White – backing vocals
- Trish Williams – backing vocals
- Dennis Wilson – backing vocals

The Shelly Kurland Strings

- Bergen White – string arrangements
- George Binkley III, John David Boyle, Marvin Chantry, Ray Christensen, Connie Ellisor, Carl Gorodetzky, Martin Katahn, Sheldon Kurland, Martha McCrory, Dennis Molchan, Samuel Terranova, Gary Vanosdale and Stephanie Woolf – string performers

=== Production ===
- Jerry Kennedy – producer
- Brent King – recording, mixing
- Steve Fralick – assistant engineer
- Mike Psanos – assistant engineer
- Hank Williams – mastering at Woodland Sound Studios (Nashville, Tennessee)
- Suha Gur – digital remastering
- Bob Heimall – art direction, design
- Mo Ström – art direction, design
- Dennis Carney – photography
- Rachel Dennison – make-up

== Charts ==
=== Album ===
Chart (1981)	Peak position
U.S. Billboard Top Country Albums	42

=== Singles ===
Year	Single	Peak positions	
Year	Single	US Country	CAN Country
1981	"Today All Over Again"	5	8
1981	"Only You (And You Alone)"	13	—
