= I'd Rather Ride Around with You =

Single by Reba McEntire

from the album What If It's You
- B-side: "State of Grace"
- Released: March 4, 1997
- Genre: Country
- Length: 3:28
- Label: MCA 72006
- Songwriters: Mark D. Sanders; Tim Nichols
- Producers: John Guess; Reba McEntire

Reba McEntire singles chronology
"How Was I to Know" (1997)	"I'd Rather Ride Around with You" (1997)	"What If It's You" (1997)

"I'd Rather Ride Around with You" is a song written by Tim Nichols and Mark D. Sanders, and recorded by American country music artist Reba McEntire. It was released on March 4, 1997, as the third single from her album What If It's You. The song reached #2 on the Billboard Hot Country Singles & Tracks chart in July 1997, behind "Carrying Your Love with Me" by George Strait.

== Music video ==
The music video premiered on CMT on March 6, 1997, during The CMT Delivery Room, and was directed by Gerry Wenner.

== Chart performance ==
Chart (1997)	Peak position
Canada Country Singles (RPM)	2
US Hot Country Songs (Billboard)	2

=== Year-end charts ===
Chart (1997)	Position
Canada Country Tracks (RPM)	18
US Country Songs (Billboard)	14
