= What If (Brenda K. Starr song) =

Single by Reba McEntire
- Released: November 25, 1997
- Genre: Country
- Length: 4:01
- Label: MCA Nashville
- Songwriter: Diane Warren
- Producers: David Malloy; Reba McEntire

Reba McEntire singles chronology
"What If It's You" (1997)	"What If" (1997)	"If You See Him/If You See Her" (1998)

"What If" is a song written by Diane Warren and recorded by American singer Brenda K. Starr for her 1991 album By Heart. The song was later covered by Belgian jazz band Vaya Con Dios on their 1995 album Roots and Wings and by American country music singer Reba McEntire in 1997.

== Reba McEntire version ==
In November 1997, American country singer Reba McEntire released a cover of the song as a benefit single for The Salvation Army. All proceeds from sales of the commercial single and artist, label, and writer royalties were donated to the organization. McEntire premiered the song during halftime at a Dallas Cowboys and Tennessee Oilers game in Dallas, Texas on November 20, 1997. The song reached number 23 on the Billboard Hot Country Songs chart and number 50 on the Billboard Hot 100.

In May 2020, McEntire re-released the single to digital and streaming retailers amidst the COVID-19 pandemic. A new music video was released featuring clips of healthcare workers, caregivers, and others interwoven with footage from the original 1997 video.

=== Chart positions ===
Chart (1997–1998)	Peak position
Australia (ARIA)	131
Canada Country Singles (RPM)	19
US Billboard Hot 100	50
US Hot Country Songs (Billboard)	23
