= Unlimited (Reba McEntire album) =

Studio album by Reba McEntire
- Released: June 14, 1982
- Studios: Woodland Sound Studios and Sound Stage Studios (Nashville, Tennessee)
- Genre: Country
- Length: 28:03
- Label: Mercury
- Producer: Jerry Kennedy

Reba McEntire chronology
Heart to Heart (1981)	Unlimited (1982)	Behind the Scene (1983)

Singles from Unlimited
- 1. "I'm Not That Lonely Yet" Released: April 1982; 2. "Can't Even Get the Blues" Released: October 1982; 3. "You're the First Time I've Thought About Leaving" Released: January 1983

Professional ratings
Review scores
Source	Rating
Allmusic	3/5 stars

Unlimited is the fifth studio album by American country music artist Reba McEntire. It was released on June 14, 1982. "I'm Not That Lonely Yet" was released as Unlimited's lead single and became the biggest hit of McEntire's career up to that point, reaching number three on the US Country chart. McEntire then topped that chart for the first time with Unlimited's two follow up singles, "Can't Even Get The Blues" and "You're the First Time I've Thought About Leaving". Unlimited was one of McEntire's first Mercury albums to be released on CD in 1990, but like most of her early material, it is now only available as a digital download.

== Track listing ==
No.	Title	Writer(s)	Length
1.	"I'd Say You"	Chuck Howard	2:58
2.	"Everything I'll Ever Own"	Johnny MacRae; Bob Morrison	3:19
3.	"What Do You Know About Heartache?"	MacRae; Morrison; Len Chiriacka; Mary Welch	2:50
4.	"Out of the Blue"	Byron Hill; Robert A. Johnson	2:34
5.	"Over, Under and Around"	Mark Miller; Bobby Randall	2:13
6.	"I'm Not That Lonely Yet"	Bill Rice; Sharon Vaughn	2:43
7.	"Whoever's Watchin'"	Gary Morris; Kevin Welch	2:46
8.	"Old Man River (I've Come to Talk Again)"	Danny Hogan; Ronny Scaife	3:22
9.	"You're the First Time I've Thought About Leaving"	Kerry Chater; Dickey Lee	2:52
10.	"Can't Even Get the Blues"	Rick Carnes; Tom Damphier	2:25

== Personnel ==
Vocals

- Reba McEntire – lead vocals, backing vocals
- Yvonne Hodges – backing vocals
- Susie McEntire – backing vocals
- Louis Nunley – backing vocals
- Rickie Page – backing vocals
- Bergen White – backing vocals
- Trish Williams – backing vocals
- Dennis Wilson – backing vocals

Musicians

- Hargus "Pig" Robbins – keyboards
- Ray Edenton – guitars
- Gordon Kennedy – guitars
- Jerry Kennedy – guitars
- Pete Wade – guitars
- Chip Young – guitars
- Weldon Myrick – steel guitar
- Bobby Thompson – banjo
- Mike Leech – bass
- Bob Moore – bass
- Jerry Carrigan – drums, percussion
- Kenny Malone – drums, percussion
- Charlie McCoy – harmonica
- Buddy Spicher – fiddle

The Nashville String Machine

- Bergen White – string arrangements
- George Binkley III, John Catchings, Marvin Chantry, Roy Christensen, Virginia Christensen, Carl Gorodetsky, Lennie Haight, Dennis Molchan, Chris Teal, Gary Vanosdale, Pamela Vanosdale and Stephanie Woolf – string performers

=== Production ===
- Jerry Kennedy – producer
- Brent King – recording, mixing
- Rick McCollister – recording, mixing
- Ken Criblez – assistant engineer
- Steve Fralick – assistant engineer
- Tim Kish – assistant engineer
- Hank Williams – mastering
- Bob Heimall – art direction, design
- Jim Houghton – photography
- Trevor Hunter – hair, make-up
- Sherrie Nicol – stylist

== Charts ==
=== Album ===
Chart (1982)	Peak position
U.S. Billboard Top Country Albums	22

=== Singles ===
Year	Single	Peak positions	
Year	Single	US Country	CAN Country
1982	"I'm Not That Lonely Yet"	3	11
1982	"Can't Even Get the Blues"	1	—
1983	"You're the First Time I've Thought About Leaving"	1	5
