= Let the Music Lift You Up =

Single by Reba McEntire

from the album What Am I Gonna Do About You
- B-side: "Lookin' for a New Love Story"
- Released: January 12, 1987
- Genre: Country
- Length: 4:26
- Label: MCA
- Songwriter(s): Troy Seals, Eddie Setser
- Producer(s): Jimmy Bowen, Reba McEntire

Reba McEntire singles chronology
"What Am I Gonna Do About You" (1986)	"Let the Music Lift You Up" (1987)	"One Promise Too Late" (1987)

"Let the Music Lift You Up" is a song written by Troy Seals and Eddie Setser, and recorded by American country music artist Reba McEntire. It was released in February 1987 as the second single from the album What Am I Gonna Do About You. The song reached #4 on the Billboard Hot Country Singles & Tracks chart.

== Chart performance ==
Chart (1987)	Peak position
US Hot Country Songs (Billboard)	4
Canadian RPM Country Tracks	5
