= What If It's You (song) =

Single by Reba McEntire

from the album What If It's You
- B-side: "Close to Crazy"
- Released: September 6, 1997
- Genre: Country
- Length: 4:06
- Label: MCA
- Songwriters: Robert Ellis Orrall, Cathy Majeski
- Producers: Reba McEntire, John Guess

Reba McEntire singles chronology
"I'd Rather Ride Around with You" (1997)	"What If It's You" (1997)	"What If" (1997)

"What If It's You" is a song written by Robert Ellis Orrall and Cathy Majeski and recorded by American country music artist Reba McEntire. It was released on September 6, 1997 as the fourth and final single and title track from the album What If It's You. It reached #15 on the Billboard Hot Country Singles & Tracks chart.

== Chart performance ==
Chart (1997)	Peak position
Canada Country Singles (RPM)	26
US Hot Country Songs (Billboard)	15
