= Have I Got a Deal for You =

Studio album by Reba McEntire
- Released: June 10, 1985
- Recorded: January 1985
- Studios: Emerald Sound Studios (Nashville, Tennessee); The Castle (Franklin, Tennessee)
- Genre: Country
- Length: 31:19
- Label: MCA
- Producers: Jimmy Bowen; Reba McEntire

Reba McEntire chronology
The Best of Reba McEntire (1985)	Have I Got a Deal for You (1985)	Reba Nell McEntire (1986)

Singles from Have I Got a Deal for You
- 1. "Have I Got a Deal for You" Released: May 1985; 2. "Only in My Mind" Released: September 1985

Professional ratings
Review scores
Source	Rating
Allmusic	3.5/5 stars
Rolling Stone	(favorable)

Have I Got a Deal for You is the ninth studio album by American country music artist Reba McEntire, released June 10, 1985, by MCA Nashville. A continuation of the same style of music that made her previous album My Kind of Country a big seller. Unlike its predecessor, which had two #1 Billboard country hits, the highest-charting singles were the #6 title song "Have I Got a Deal for You" and the #5 "Only in My Mind”, her first and only self-written single to date.

== Track listing ==
No.	Title	Writer(s)	Length
1.	"I'm in Love All Over"	Don King; J. D. Martin	3:04
2.	"She's Single Again"	Charlie Craig; Peter McCann	2:26
3.	"The Great Divide"	Michael P. Heeney; Jackson Leap	3:05
4.	"Have I Got a Deal for You"	Heeney; Leap	2:43
5.	"Red Roses (Won't Work Now)"	Jimbeau Hinson; David Lee Murphy	3:34
6.	"Only in My Mind"	Reba McEntire	3:37
7.	"She's the One Loving You Now"	McEntire; David Anthony; Leigh Reynolds	2:39
8.	"Whose Heartache Is This Anyway"	Wayland Holyfield; Jim McBride	3:20
9.	"I Don't Need Nothin' You Ain't Got"	Heeney; David Scarlett	2:49
10.	"Don't Forget Your Way Home"	Ed Hunnicutt, John Brannen	3:22

== Personnel ==
Vocals

- Reba McEntire – lead vocals, backing vocals
- Pake McEntire – backing vocals

Musicians

- John Hobbs – keyboards
- Larry Byrom – guitars
- Billy Joe Walker, Jr. – guitars
- Reggie Young – guitars
- Weldon Myrick – steel guitar
- Emory Gordy, Jr. – bass guitar
- Matt Betton – drums
- Johnny Gimble – fiddle

=== Production ===
- Jimmy Bowen – producer
- Reba McEntire – producer
- Chuck Ainlay – first engineer
- Ron Treat – first engineer
- Keith Odle – second engineer
- Glenn Meadows – mastering at Masterfonics (Nashville, Tennessee)
- Andy Engel – design
- Jeff Adamoff – art direction
- Vartan Kurjian – art direction
- Lisa Powers – photography
- Kenneth Gonzales – hair, make-up
- Sheri Weiss – stylist
- Emmylou Harris – liner notes
- Loretta Lynn – liner notes

CD release

- Glenn Meadows – mastering
- Milan Bogdan – digital editing
- Katie Gillon – CD coordinator
- Sherri Halford –CD coordinator
- Simon Levy – art direction
- Camille Engel – design

== Charts ==
=== Album ===
Chart (1985)	Peak position
U.S. Billboard Top Country Albums	27

=== Singles ===
Year	Single	Peak positions	
Year	Single	US Country	CAN Country
1985	"Have I Got a Deal for You"	6	10
1985	"Only in My Mind"	5	6

== Certifications and sales ==
Region	Certification	Certified units/sales
United States (RIAA)	Gold	500,000^{^}
^{^} Shipments figures based on certification alone.
