= Only in My Mind =

Single by Reba McEntire

from the album Have I Got a Deal for You
- B-side: "She's the One Loving You Now"
- Released: September 1985
- Recorded: 1985
- Genre: Country
- Length: 3:41
- Label: MCA
- Songwriter(s): Reba McEntire
- Producer(s): Jimmy Bowen; Reba McEntire

Reba McEntire singles chronology
"Have I Got a Deal for You" (1985)	"Only in My Mind" (1985)	"Whoever's in New England" (1986)

"Only in My Mind" is a song written and recorded by American country music artist Reba McEntire. It was released in September 1985 as the second single from the album Have I Got a Deal for You. The song peaked at number 5 on the Billboard Hot Country Singles & Tracks chart. It is still the only single ever released that was solely written by McEntire.

== Background ==
"Only in My Mind" was recorded at the MCA studio located in Nashville, Tennessee. The song was the only track on McEntire's, Have I Got a Deal for You that was singlehandedly written by McEntire.

== Content ==
From the viewpoint of a female narrator, the song's storyline explains the conversation between a woman and man. The woman's husband asks if she has ever cheated on him, and she answers, "only in my mind."

== Critical reception ==
Unlike her previous releases, "Only in My Mind" received mixed reviews from many music critics. William Ruhlmann of Allmusic called it "Another mistake was that she dared to do some writing herself, although her "Only in My Mind," which actually got to number five in the country charts, demonstrated that she had absorbed the lesson of "Somebody Should Leave" in trying to come up with songs that addressed the viewpoint of contemporary women." Rolling Stone Magazine's David Gates gave the song a favorable review, after reviewing her 1985 album. Gates stated, "McEntire is at her best on these songs and on "Only in My Mind," her first noncollaborative songwriting effort on record. It's a noncheater's cheating song, a tense dialogue between husband and wife ("He said, 'Have you ever cheated on me?'/And I said, 'Only in my mind' "), as told to the man with whom she refrains from cheating."

== Release and chart performance ==
"Only in My Mind" was officially released as a single to radio in September 1985, her last single released during the year. The song peaked one position higher than her last single, reaching number 5 on the Billboard Hot Country Songs chart in late 1985, while also reaching number 6 on the Canadian RPM Country Tracks chart. The song helped McEntire to become a member of country music's Grand Ole Opry program, where she has been a member since.

=== Charts ===
Chart (1985)	Peak position
US Hot Country Songs (Billboard)	5
Canadian RPM Country Tracks	6
