= Feel the Fire (Reba McEntire album) =

Studio album by Reba McEntire
- Released: 1980
- Studios: Sound Stage Studios (Nashville, Tennessee)
- Genre: Country
- Length: 30:10
- Label: Mercury
- Producer: Jerry Kennedy

Reba McEntire chronology
Out of a Dream (1979)	Feel the Fire (1980)	Heart to Heart (1981)

Singles from Feel the Fire
- 1. "(You Lift Me) Up to Heaven" Released: May 1980; 2. "I Can See Forever in Your Eyes" Released: October 1980; 3. "I Don't Think Love Ought to Be That Way" Released: February 1981

Professional ratings
Review scores
Source	Rating
AllMusic	4/5 stars
Billboard	(unrated)
The Rolling Stone Album Guide	2.5/5 stars

Feel the Fire is the third studio album by American country music singer Reba McEntire, released in 1980 through Mercury Records. Its first single release, "(You Lift Me) Up to Heaven", was her first top ten hit.

== Track listing ==
No.	Title	Writer(s)	Length
1.	"(You Lift Me) Up to Heaven"	Johnny MacRae; Bob Morrison; Bill Zerface; Jim Zerface	2:45
2.	"Tears on My Pillow"	Sylvester Bradford; Al Lewis	2:33
3.	"I Don't Think Love Ought to Be That Way"	Richard Mainegra; Layng Martine Jr.	2:40
4.	"Long Distance Lover"	Pauline Lee; Robert Rosenberg	3:53
5.	"If I Had It My Way"	Robert John Jones; Jerry Taylor	2:44
6.	"I Can See Forever in Your Eyes"	Bob DiPiero	2:44
7.	"Poor Man's Roses (Or a Rich Man's Gold)"	Milton DeLugg; Bob Hilliard	2:55
8.	"My Turn"	Len Chera; Jay Huguely	3:15
9.	"Look at the One (Who's Been Lookin' at You)"	MacRae; Wanda Mallette; Morrison	2:51
10.	"Suddenly There's a Valley"	Biff Jones; Chuck Meyer	3:29

== Personnel ==
Vocals

- Reba McEntire – lead vocals, backing vocals
- Tom Brannon – backing vocals
- Phillip Forrest – backing vocals
- Yvonne Hodges – backing vocals
- Donna McElroy – backing vocals
- Louis Nunley – backing vocals
- Diane Tidwell – backing vocals
- Bergen White – backing vocals
- Trish Williams – backing vocals
- Dennis Wilson – backing vocals
- Gil Wright – backing vocals

Musicians

- Hargus "Pig" Robbins – acoustic piano, keyboards
- Harold Bradley – guitars
- Jimmy Capps – guitars
- Ray Edenton – guitars
- Gordon Kennedy – guitars
- Charlie McCoy – guitars, harmonica
- Pete Wade – guitars
- Chip Young – guitars
- Weldon Myrick – steel guitar
- Mike Leech – bass
- Bob Moore – bass
- Jerry Carrigan – drums
- Buddy Harman – drums

The Shelly Kurland Strings

- Bergen White – string arrangements
- John Catchings and Roy Christensen – cello
- Cindy Reynolds – harp
- Marvin Chantry, Virginia Christensen and Gary Vanosdale – viola
- George Binkley III, Connie Ellisor, Carl Gorodetzky, Lennie Haight, Sheldon Kurland, Wilfred Lehmann Dennis Molchan, Samuel Terranova and Stephanie Woolf – violin

=== Production ===
- Jerry Kennedy – producer
- Brent King – engineer
- Lee Groitzsch – assistant engineer
- Hank Williams – mastering at Woodland Sound Studios (Nashville, Tennessee)
- Bob Heimall – art direction
- Stephanie Zuras – design
- Dennis Carney – photography
- Rachel Dennison – make-up
- Red Steagall – management

== Charts ==
Singles

Year	Single	Chart	Position
1980	"(You Lift Me) Up to Heaven"	Hot Country Singles & Tracks	8
1980	"I Can See Forever in Your Eyes"	Hot Country Singles & Tracks	18
1981	"I Don't Think Love Oughta Be That Way"	Hot Country Singles & Tracks	13
