= How Was I to Know (Reba McEntire song) =

"How Was I To Know"

Single by Reba McEntire

from the album What If It's You
- B-side: "Just Looking for Him"
- Released: December 16, 1996
- Recorded: May 1996
- Genre: Country
- Length: 3:42
- Label: MCA
- Songwriters: Cathy Majeski, Sunny Russ, Stephony Smith
- Producers: John Guess and Reba McEntire

Reba McEntire singles chronology
"The Fear of Being Alone" (1996)	"How Was I To Know" (1996)	"I'd Rather Ride Around with You" (1997)

"How Was I To Know" is a song written by Stephony Smith, Cathy Majeski and Sonny Russ, and recorded by American country music singer Reba McEntire. It was released in December 1996 as the second single from the album What If It's You. The song reached the top of the Billboard Hot Country Singles & Tracks chart.

John Michael Montgomery recorded an unrelated song of the same title later in the year.

== Chart positions ==
Chart (1996–1997)	Peak position
Canada Country Singles (RPM)	1
US Hot Country Songs (Billboard)	1

=== Year-end charts ===
Chart (1997)	Position
Canada Country Tracks (RPM)	17
US Country Songs (Billboard)	15
