= Love Will Find Its Way to You =

Single by Reba McEntire

from the album The Last One to Know
- B-side: "Someone Else"
- Released: January 23, 1988
- Genre: Country
- Length: 3:32
- Label: MCA
- Songwriter(s): Dave Loggins; J. D. Martin
- Producer(s): Jimmy Bowen; Reba McEntire

Reba McEntire singles chronology
"The Last One to Know" (1987)	"Love Will Find Its Way to You" (1988)	"Sunday Kind of Love" (1988)

"Love Will Find Its Way to You" is a song written by Dave Loggins and J.D. Martin, and recorded by American country music artist Reba McEntire. It was released in January 1988 as the second single from the album The Last One to Know. The song was McEntire's tenth number one country single. The single went to number one for one week and spent a total of thirteen weeks within the top 40. It was previously recorded by Lee Greenwood for his 1986 album of the same name and by Marie Osmond on her 1985 album, There's No Stopping Your Heart.

== Charts ==
=== Weekly charts ===
Chart (1988)	Peak position
US Hot Country Songs (Billboard)	1
Canadian RPM Country Tracks	1

=== Year-end charts ===
Chart (1988)	Position
US Hot Country Songs (Billboard)	45
