= I Don't Think Love Ought to Be That Way =

Single by Reba McEntire

from the album Feel the Fire
- Released: February 1981
- Genre: Country
- Length: 2:40
- Label: PolyGram/Mercury
- Songwriter(s): Layng Martine Jr.; Richard Mainegra
- Producer(s): Jerry Kennedy

Reba McEntire singles chronology
"I Can See Forever in Your Eyes" (1980)	"I Don't Think Love Ought to Be That Way" (1981)	"Today All Over Again" (1981)

"I Don't Think Love Ought to Be That Way" is a song written by Richard Mainegra and Layng Martine Jr., and recorded by American country music artist Reba McEntire. It was released in February 1981 as the third single from the album Feel the Fire. The song became a top 20 hit on the American country music chart.

== Background and content ==
After signing a recording contract with PolyGram/Mercury Records in 1975, McEntire released a series of unsuccessful singles. However, her career gained more momentum by 1980 following two top 20 hits and her first top ten country hit, "(You Lift Me) Up to Heaven". It was followed in by several top 20 charting singles including "I Don't Think Love Ought to Be That Way". The track was composed by Layng Martine Jr. and Richard Mainegra. It was recorded by McEntire in March 1980 at the Sound Stage Studio in Nashville, Tennessee. The session was produced by Jerry Kennedy. Two additional sides were cut during the same session.

== Release and chart performance ==
"I Don't Think Love Ought to Be That Way" was first released on McEntire's third studio album titled Feel the Fire. It was the third and final single spawned from the album. PolyGram/Mercury released it as a single in February 1981 and was issued as a 7" vinyl single. It was backed by "Tears on My Pillow" on the B-side. It spent a total of 16 weeks on the Billboard Hot Country Singles chart, eventually reaching number 13 in May 1981. It became McEntire's fifth top 20 single in her career.

== Track listing ==
7" vinyl single

- "I Don't Think Love Ought to Be That Way" – 2:40
- "Tears on My Pillow" – 2:33

== Charts ==
Chart performance for "I Don't Think Love Ought to Be That Way"
Chart (1981)	Peak position
US Hot Country Songs (Billboard)	13
