= Behind the Scene =

Studio album by Reba McEntire
- Released: August 15, 1983
- Studios: Sound Stage Studios (Nashville, Tennessee)
- Genre: Country
- Length: 28:19
- Label: Mercury
- Producer: Jerry Kennedy

Reba McEntire chronology
Unlimited (1982)	Behind the Scene (1983)	Just a Little Love (1984)

Singles from Behind the Scene
- 1. "Why Do We Want (What We Know We Can't Have)" Released: June 1983; 2. "There Ain't No Future in This" Released: November 1983

Professional ratings
Review scores
Source	Rating
Allmusic	2.5/5 stars

Behind the Scene is the sixth studio album by American country music artist Reba McEntire, released on August 15, 1983. It includes the singles "Why Do We Want (What We Know We Can't Have)", which was a top ten hit and "There Ain't No Future in This". It was her last album for Mercury Records before leaving for MCA Nashville in 1984. McEntire felt the need for change in record labels at the time as an opportunity to gain more independence in the material she recorded.

== Track listing ==
No.	Title	Writer(s)	Length
1.	"Love Isn't Love ('Til You Give It Away)"	Don Roth, Timmy Tappan	3:09
2.	"Is It Really Love"	Rita Gannon, Donald Hare	2:54
3.	"Reasons"	Reba McEntire	2:06
4.	"Nickel Dreams"	Donny Lowery, Mac McAnally	2:55
5.	"One Good Reason"	Bob DiPiero, Johnny MacRae	2:59
6.	"You Really Better Love Me After This"	Bill Rice, Sharon Vaughn	3:50
7.	"There Ain't No Future in This"	Rice, Vaughn	2:34
8.	"Why Do We Want (What We Know We Can't Have)"	Don King, Dave Woodward	2:37
9.	"I Sacrificed More Than You'll Ever Lose"	James Benton, Beverly J. Carlton	2:37
10.	"Pins and Needles"	Janis Carnes, Rick Carnes, Chip Hardy	2:15

== Personnel ==
Vocalists

- Reba McEntire – lead vocals, harmony vocals
- Yvonne Hodges – backing vocals
- Dorris King – backing vocals
- Trish Williams – backing vocals

Musicians

- David Briggs – keyboards
- Ray Edenton – guitars, banjo, mandolin
- Jon Goin – guitars
- Jerry Kennedy – guitars
- Dale Sellers – guitars
- Pete Wade – guitars
- Chip Young – guitars
- Bobby Thompson – guitars, banjo
- Weldon Myrick – steel guitar
- Mike Leech – bass
- Jerry Carrigan – drums, percussion
- Gene Chrisman – drums, percussion
- Farrell Morris – percussion
- Billy Puett – fiddle
- Buddy Spicher – fiddle
- Bergen White – flute and string arrangements

The Nashville String Machine

- George Binkley III, John David Boyle, Marvin Chantry, Roy Christensen, Mark Feldman, Daniel Furth, Carl Gorodetzky, Lennie Haight, Phyllis Hiltz, Dennis Molchan, Walter Schwede, Gary Vanosdale, Pamela Vanosdale, Kristin Wilkinson and Stephanie Woolf – string performers

== Production ==
- Jerry Kennedy – producer
- Lee Groitzsch – engineer
- Brent King – assistant engineer
- Tim Kish – assistant engineer
- Hank Williams – mastering at MasterMix (Nashville, Tennessee)
- Bill Barnes – art direction, album graphics
- Deb Mahalanobis – design
- Mario Casilli – photography

== Charts ==
=== Album ===
Chart (1983)	Peak position
U.S. Billboard Top Country Albums	36

=== Singles ===
Year	Single	Peak positions	
Year	Single	US Country	CAN Country
1983	"Why Do We Want (What We Know We Can't Have)"	7	45
1983	"There Ain't No Future in This"	12	33
