= I Can See Forever in Your Eyes =

Single by Reba McEntire

from the album Feel the Fire
- Released: October 1980
- Genre: Country
- Length: 3:47
- Label: PolyGram/Mercury
- Songwriter: Bob DiPiero
- Producer: Jerry Kennedy

Reba McEntire singles chronology
"(You Lift Me) Up to Heaven" (1980)	"I Can See Forever in Your Eyes" (1980)	"I Don't Think Love Ought to Be That Way" (1981)

"I Can See Forever in Your Eyes" is a song written by Bob DiPiero, and recorded by American country music artist Reba McEntire. It was released in October 1980 as the second single from the album Feel the Fire. The song became a top 20 hit on the American country music chart.

== Background and content ==
By 1980, McEntire's country music career was gaining more momentum with the release of several singles. Her 1979 cover of "Sweet Dreams" reached the country top 20 and was followed by 1980's "(You Lift Me) Up to Heaven", which became her first top ten hit. Her profile in country would continue to be raised with several further hits in the early 1980s, including "I Can See Forever in Your Eyes". The track was composed by Bob DiPiero and was recorded by McEntire in June 1980 at the Sound Stage Studio in Nashville, Tennessee. The session was produced by Jerry Kennedy. Two additional sides were cut during the same session.

== Release and chart performance ==
"I Can See Forever in Your Eyes" was first released on McEntire's third studio album titled Feel the Fire. In October 1980, "I Can See Forever in Your Eyes" was released as a single on PolyGram/Mercury Records. It was issued as a 7" vinyl single and was backed with a cover of "A Poor Man's Roses (Or a Rich Man's Gold)" on the B-side. It was the second single issued from Feel the Fire. It spent a total of 14 weeks on the Billboard Hot Country Singles chart, eventually reaching number 18 in December 1980. It became McEntire's fourth top 20 single in her career. It also became her fourth single release to chart on the RPM Country Tracks chart in Canada, climbing to number 33.

== Track listing ==
7" vinyl single

- "I Can See Forever in Your Eyes" – 2:41
- "A Poor Man's Roses (Or a Rich Man's Gold)" – 2:55

== Charts ==
Chart performance for "I Can See Forever in Your Eyes"
Chart (1980)	Peak position
Canada Country Songs (RPM)	28
US Hot Country Songs (Billboard)	18
