= The Fear of Being Alone =

Single by Reba McEntire

from the album What If It's You
- B-side: "Never Had a Reason To"
- Released: September 16, 1996
- Recorded: 1996
- Studio: Starstruck Studios (Nashville, TN)
- Genre: Country
- Length: 3:04
- Label: MCA Nashville
- Songwriters: Walt Aldridge; Bruce Miller
- Producers: Reba McEntire; John Guess

Reba McEntire singles chronology
"You Keep Me Hangin' On" (1996)	"The Fear of Being Alone" (1996)	"How Was I to Know" (1996)

"The Fear of Being Alone" is a song by American country music artist Reba McEntire, released on September 16, 1996, as the lead single to her 22nd studio album What If It's You (1996).

The song was written by Walt Aldridge and Bruce Miller and produced by McEntire and John Guess; although he was featured as an engineer on McEntire's previous albums, this was the first time he was directly involved with the production. Recording for the song took place in Starstruck Studios in Nashville, Tennessee.

Critically acclaimed, "The Fear of Being Alone" was a success, giving McEntire her first top-five single in nearly two years. It peaked at number two on the US Hot Country Songs chart while topping Canada's RPM Country Tracks.

== Content ==
The song is about a woman and man, who is presumed to be a widower, going on a date. When the man tries to say that he loves her, she rejects it, saying he doesn't really love her and only loves her because he doesn't want to be alone.

== Critical reception ==
Deborah Evans Price from Billboard gave the single a positive review saying, "McEntire's vocal performance infuses the song with a mixture of hope and caution. Penned by Walt Aldridge and Bruce Miller, it's a strong song, and McEntire's vibrant performance should serve her well at country radio." In his retrospective series "Every No. 1 Single of the Nineties", Kevin John Coyne of Country Universe critically praised the track, calling it McEntire's best single of the decade and one of the best country songs of all time.

== Music video ==
The accompanying music video for "The Fear of Being Alone" was directed by Dominic Orlando. It features McEntire singing at a recording studio, filmed at Starstruck Studios. The video debuted to CMT on October 6, 1996. The following week on October 13, 1996, the video debuted to the now defunct The Nashville Network.

== Charts ==
On October 5, 1996, "The Fear of Being Alone" debuted at number 41 on the US Billboard Hot Country Songs chart, becoming both the Hot Shot Debut of the week and McEntire's highest debut on the chart, only being broken by "Strange" when it debuted at number 39 in 2009. It peaked at number two on the chart the week of December 7, 1996, blocked by Alan Jackson's "Little Bitty". It spent ten weeks in the top ten and spent 20 weeks overall on the chart. It however reached number one on Radio & Records, topping the magazine's country chart on December 6, 1996. The song also reached as high as number eight on Cashbox's Country Singles chart before the magazine ceased publication in November 1996.

== Charts ==
=== Weekly charts ===
Chart (1996)	Peak position
Canada Country Singles (RPM)	1
US Hot Country Songs (Billboard)	2
US Country Top 50 (Radio & Records)	1
US Top 100 Country Singles (Cashbox)	8 (Note: "The Fear of Being Alone" reached number eight when Cashbox ceased publication in November 1996.)

=== Year-end charts ===
Chart (1996)	Position
Canada Country Tracks (RPM)	36
US Country (Radio & Records)	78

Chart (1997)	Position
US Country Songs (Billboard)	84
