= Just a Little Love =

Studio album by Reba McEntire
- Released: April 2, 1984
- Recorded: October–December 1983
- Studios: Music City Music Hall (Nashville, Tennessee)
- Genre: Country
- Length: 33:50
- Label: MCA
- Producer: Norro Wilson

Reba McEntire chronology
Behind the Scene (1983)	Just a Little Love (1984)	My Kind of Country (1984)

Singles from Just a Little Love
- 1. "Just a Little Love" Released: February 1984; 2. "He Broke Your Memory Last Night" Released: June 1984

Professional ratings
Review scores
Source	Rating
Allmusic	link

Just a Little Love is the seventh studio album by American country music artist Reba McEntire. It was released on April 2, 1984, as her first album for MCA Nashville. The album's singles were its title track and "He Broke Your Memory Last Night." Both songs charted on Hot Country Songs, with the former reaching #5 and the latter reaching #15.

== Track listing ==
No.	Title	Writer(s)	Length
1.	"Just a Little Love"	Dennis Morgan, Stephen Allen Davis	3:56
2.	"Poison Sugar"	Dennis Knutson, A.L. "Doodle" Owens	3:03
3.	"I'm Gettin' Over You"	Davis, Morgan	3:20
4.	"You Are Always There for Me"	Norro Wilson, Wayland Holyfield	3:54
5.	"Every Second Someone Breaks a Heart"	Richard Brossman	3:35
6.	"Tell Me What's So Good About Goodbye"	Allen Henson, Keith Palmer	3:30
7.	"He Broke Your Memory Last Night"	Dickey Lee, Bucky Jones	2:49
8.	"If Only"	Holyfield, Amy Sky	3:38
9.	"Congratulations"	Dave Gibson, Patti Stephens	2:52
10.	"Silver Eagle"	Janis Carnes, Rick Carnes, Chip Hardy	2:54

== Personnel ==
Adapted from the AllMusic credits.

- Reba McEntire – all vocals
- David Briggs – keyboards
- Gary Prim – keyboards
- Shane Keister – synthesizers
- Brent Rowan – lead guitar
- Billy Sanford – lead guitar
- Chip Young – rhythm guitar
- Weldon Myrick – steel guitar
- David Hungate – bass
- Bob Wray – bass
- Jerry Kroon – drums
- Larrie Londin – drums
- James Stroud – drums
- Farrell Morris – percussion
- Terry McMillan – harmonica

== Production ==
- Norro Wilson – producer
- Bill Harris – engineer
- Doug Crider – assistant engineer
- Disc Mastering (Nashville, Tennessee) – mastering location
- George Osaki – art direction
- Mario Casilli – photography

CD release

- Glenn Meadows – mastering at Masterfonics (Nashville, Tennessee)
- Milan Bogdan – digital editing
- Katie Gillon – CD coordinator
- Sherri Halford – CD coordinator
- Simon Levy – art direction
- Camille Engel – design

== Chart performance ==
=== Album ===
Chart (1984)	Peak position
U.S. Billboard Top Country Albums	23

=== Singles ===
Year	Single	Peak positions	
Year	Single	US Country	CAN Country
1984	"Just a Little Love"	5	37
1984	"He Broke Your Memory Last Night"	15	19
