= Have I Got a Deal for You (song) =

Single by Reba McEntire

from the album Have I Got a Deal for You
- B-side: "Whose Heartache Is This Anyway"
- Released: June 10, 1985
- Genre: Country
- Length: 2:46
- Label: MCA
- Songwriter(s): Michael P. Heeney, Jackson Leap
- Producer(s): Jimmy Bowen, Reba McEntire

Reba McEntire singles chronology
| "Somebody Should Leave" (1985) | "Have I Got a Deal for You" (1985) | "Only in My Mind" (1985) |

"Have I Got a Deal for You" is a song written by Michael P. Heeney and Jackson Leap, and recorded by American country music artist Reba McEntire. It was released in June 1985 as the first single and title track from the album Have I Got a Deal for You. The song reached #6 on the Billboard Hot Country Singles & Tracks chart.

== Chart performance ==
| Chart (1985) | Peak position |
|---|---|
| US Hot Country Songs (Billboard) | 6 |
| Canadian RPM Country Tracks | 10 |
