= Starting Over (Reba McEntire album) =

Studio album by Reba McEntire
- Released: October 3, 1995
- Studios: Emerald Sound Studios, Sixteenth Avenue Sound and Javelina Recording Studios (Nashville, Tennessee)
- Genre: Country
- Length: 41:10
- Label: MCA
- Producers: Tony Brown; Reba McEntire; Michael Omartian (associate)

Reba McEntire chronology
Oklahoma Girl (1994)	Starting Over (1995)	What If It's You (1996)

Singles from Starting Over
- 1. "On My Own" Released: August 1995; 2. "Ring on Her Finger, Time on Her Hands" Released: November 1995; 3. "Starting Over Again" Released: March 1996; 4. "You Keep Me Hangin' On" Released: April 1996

Professional ratings
Review scores
Source	Rating
AllMusic	3/5 stars
Los Angeles Times	2/4 stars
The Guardian	3/5 stars

Starting Over is the twentieth studio album by American country music artist Reba McEntire on October 3, 1995. It was a tribute to her roots and influences, featuring cover versions of songs by artists whom she admired growing up. Among the artists being covered were Dolly Parton, Donna Summer, Linda Ronstadt, The Supremes, Lee Greenwood, Crystal Gayle and Patti LaBelle.

McEntire called on Trisha Yearwood, Martina McBride and Linda Davis to join her for "On My Own", the album's first single. Additionally, a CBS television special entitled Reba: Celebrating 20 Years featured McEntire performing songs from the album in concert interspersed with footage of her returning home to her family in Oklahoma. The special was eventually released separately on video. The album peaked at No. 1 on the Billboard country albums chart and at No. 5 on the Billboard 200. It was certified Platinum by the RIAA three months after its release.

The album featured only one Top 10 single, "Ring on Her Finger, Time On Her Hands", which had been previously a Top Ten country hit for Greenwood in the mid-1980s; McEntire's rendition was a Top Ten hit as well upon its 1996 release, reaching No. 9 on the Billboard Hot Country Singles chart. The third single, "Starting Over Again" was composed by Summer and her husband Bruce Sudano, and had originally been a number one hit for Parton in 1980; McEntire's version reached the top twenty. The fourth and final single, a cover of the Supremes' hit "You Keep Me Hangin' On", was not released to country radio, but did reach number 2 on Billboard's Hot Dance Club Play chart.

Love to Infinity produced remixes of the track "You Keep Me Hangin' On" that were released to dance clubs in the US. As a result, this song spent two weeks at No. 2 on the Billboard Hot Dance Club Play chart, McEntire's only hit on this survey.

The debuted at No. 1 on the Billboard Country Albums chart for the week of October 21, 1995, selling 101,000 copies. It stayed at No. 1 for two consecutive weeks and remained in the Top Ten for 19 weeks. It debuted at No. 5 on the Billboard Top 200 Albums chart for the week of October 21, 1995, and remained in the Top Ten for two weeks.

A 30th anniversary deluxe edition of the album was released on January 23, 2026, featuring three new tracks, "Heat Wave" (originally by Martha and the Vandellas), "Misty Blue" (originally by Eddy Arnold), and "Tulsa Time" (originally by Don Williams).

== Track listing ==
No.	Title	Writer(s)	Length
1.	"Talking in Your Sleep"	Roger Cook, Bobby Wood	4:20
2.	"Please Come to Boston"	Dave Loggins	4:37
3.	"On My Own" (with Linda Davis, Martina McBride and Trisha Yearwood)	Carole Bayer Sager, Burt Bacharach	4:31
4.	"I Won't Mention It Again"	Cameron L. Mullins, Carolyn Jean Yates	4:11
5.	"You're No Good"	Clint Ballard Jr.	3:30
6.	"Ring on Her Finger, Time on Her Hands"	Don Goodman, Pam Rose, Mary Ann Kennedy	4:10
7.	"Five Hundred Miles Away From Home"	Bobby Bare, Charlie Williams, Hedy West	4:21
8.	"Starting Over Again"	Bruce Sudano, Donna Summer	4:07
9.	"You Keep Me Hangin' On"	Brian Holland, Lamont Dozier, Edward Holland Jr.	3:22
10.	"By The Time I Get to Phoenix"	Jimmy Webb	3:59

30th anniversary deluxe edition bonus tracks
No.	Title	Writer(s)	Length
11.	"Heat Wave"	Holland–Dozier–Holland	2:57
12.	"Misty Blue"	Bob Montgomery	4:22
13.	"Tulsa Time"	Danny Flowers	3:03

== Personnel ==
- Reba McEntire – lead vocals

Musicians

- Steve Nathan – keyboards, synthesizers, Wurlitzer electric piano
- Michael Omartian – acoustic piano, keyboards, track arrangements, string arrangements
- Larry Byrom – acoustic guitar, electric guitar
- Dann Huff – electric guitar
- Mac McAnally – acoustic guitar
- Terry Crisp – steel guitar
- Leland Sklar – bass
- Carlos Vega – drums
- Tom Roady – percussion
- Rob Hajacos – fiddle
- Chris Hicks – saxophone
- The Nashville String Machine – strings

Backing vocalists

- Bob Bailey
- Karla Bonoff
- Lisa Cochran
- Linda Davis
- Vicki Hampton
- Martina McBride
- Michael Mellett
- Kim Richey
- Chris Rodriguez
- Wendy Waldman
- Trisha Yearwood

Production

- Tony Brown – producer
- Reba McEntire – producer, make-up
- Michael Omartian – associate producer
- Terry Christian – engineer (1, 4–8, 10), overdub recording
- Steve Tillisch – engineer (2, 3, 9)
- Grant Greene – assistant engineer (1, 4–8, 10)
- Pete Martinez – assistant engineer (2, 3, 9)
- King Williams – overdub assistant
- John Guess – mixing
- Derek Bason – mix assistant
- Marty Williams – mastering
- The Work Station (Nashville, Tennessee) – mixing and mastering location
- Jessie Noble – project coordinator
- Cindy Owen – art direction, design
- Mark Tucker – photography
- Sandi Spika – hair, wardrobe stylist
- Narvel Blackstock for Starstruck Entertainment – management

== Charts ==
=== Weekly charts ===
Chart (1995)	Peak position
Australian Albums (ARIA)	134
Canadian Albums (RPM)	34
Canadian Country Albums (RPM)	1
US Billboard 200	5
US Top Country Albums (Billboard)	1

=== Year-end charts ===
Chart (1995)	Position
US Billboard 200	160
US Top Country Albums (Billboard)	27
Chart (1996)	Position
US Billboard 200	68
US Top Country Albums (Billboard)	11

=== Singles ===
Year	Single	Peak chart positions		
Year	Single	US Country	US Dance	CAN Country
1995	"On My Own"	20	—	22
1995	"Ring on Her Finger, Time on Her Hands"	9	—	14
1996	"Starting Over Again"	19	—	26
1996	"You Keep Me Hangin' On"	—	2	—

== Certifications and sales ==
Region	Certification	Certified units/sales
United States (RIAA)	Platinum	1,000,000^{^}
^{^} Shipments figures based on certification alone.
