= What If It's You =

Studio album by Reba McEntire
- Released: November 5, 1996
- Studios: Starstruck Studios (Nashville, Tennessee)
- Genre: Country
- Length: 35:34
- Label: MCA
- Producers: John Guess; Reba McEntire

Reba McEntire chronology
Starting Over (1995)	What If It's You (1996)	If You See Him (1998)

Singles from What If It's You
- 1. "The Fear of Being Alone" Released: September 16, 1996; 2. "How Was I to Know" Released: December 16, 1996; 3. "I'd Rather Ride Around with You" Released: March 4, 1997; 4. "What If It's You" Released: September 6, 1997

Professional ratings
Review scores
Source	Rating
AllMusic	2.5/5 stars
Los Angeles Times	3/4 stars

What If It's You is the twenty-first studio album by American country music artist Reba McEntire. It was released on November 5, 1996, and would peak at #1 on the Billboard country chart and #15 on the Billboard 200. It is certified 2× Multi-Platinum by the RIAA. What If It's You was the first album in which McEntire did not use session musicians; relying instead on her touring band. The album produced four singles in "The Fear of Being Alone", "How Was I to Know", "I'd Rather Ride Around with You" and "What If It's You", which respectively reached #2, #1, #2, and #15 on the Billboard country charts.

The album peaked at #1 on the Billboard Top Country Albums chart and #15 on the Billboard Top 200 Albums chart.

== Track listing ==
No.	Title	Writer(s)	Length
1.	"How Was I to Know"	Cathy Majeski, Sunny Russ, Stephony Smith	3:41
2.	"The Fear of Being Alone"	Walt Aldridge, Bruce Miller	2:58
3.	"What If It's You"	Robert Ellis Orrall, Majeski	4:07
4.	"I'd Rather Ride Around with You"	Mark D. Sanders, Tim Nichols	3:28
5.	"It Don't Matter"	Tommy Lee James	3:36
6.	"State of Grace"	Trey Bruce, Lisa Drew	3:31
7.	"Close to Crazy"	Jerry Salley, Melba Montgomery	3:38
8.	"She's Callin' It Love"	Russ	2:59
9.	"Just Looking for Him"	Russ	3:44
10.	"Never Had a Reason To"	Nichols, Sanders	3:52

== Personnel ==
- Reba McEntire – vocals
- Paul Hollowell – acoustic piano
- Doug Sisemore – keyboards
- Biff Watson – acoustic guitars
- Steve Gibson – acoustic guitar (2)
- Kent Wells – electric guitars
- Terry Crisp – steel guitar
- Larry Franklin – fiddle, mandolin
- Chopper Anderson – bass
- Scott Hawkins – drums, percussion
- Joe Chemay – backing vocals
- Liana Manis – backing vocals

=== Production ===
- Reba McEntire – producer, make-up
- John Guess – producer, recording, mixing
- Derek Bason – recording, mix assistant
- Scott Ahaus – recording assistant
- Patrick Murphy – recording assistant
- Marty Williams – mastering at The Work Station (Nashville, Tennessee)
- Carole Ann Mobley – production coordinator
- Cindy Owen – art direction, design
- Mark Tucker – photography
- Sandi Spika – hair, wardrobe stylist
- Mary Beth Felts – hair, make-up
- Narvel Blackstock for Starstruck Entertainment – management

== Charts ==
=== Weekly charts ===
Chart (1996)	Peak position
Australian Albums (ARIA)	173
Canadian Albums (RPM)	36
Canadian Country Albums (RPM)	3
US Billboard 200	15
US Top Country Albums (Billboard)	1

=== Year-end charts ===
Chart (1996)	Position
US Top Country Albums (Billboard)	70
Chart (1997)	Position
US Billboard 200	65
US Top Country Albums (Billboard)	9

=== Singles ===
Year	Single	Peak positions	
Year	Single	US Country	CAN Country
1996	"The Fear of Being Alone"	2	1
1996	"How Was I to Know"	1	1
1997	"I'd Rather Ride Around with You"	2	2
1997	"What If It's You"	15	26

== Certifications and sales ==
Region	Certification	Certified units/sales
United States (RIAA)	2× Platinum	2,000,000^{^}
^{^} Shipments figures based on certification alone.
