= Why Do We Want (What We Know We Can't Have) =

Single by Reba McEntire

from the album Behind the Scene
- B-side: "I Can See Forever in Your Eyes"
- Released: July 30, 1983
- Genre: Country rock
- Length: 2:39
- Label: Mercury
- Songwriter(s): Don King, David Woodward
- Producer(s): Jerry Kennedy

Reba McEntire singles chronology
"You're the First Time I've Thought About Leaving" (1983)	"Why Do We Want (What We Know We Can't Have)" (1983)	"There Ain't No Future in This" (1983)

"Why Do We Want (What We Know We Can't Have)" is a song written by Don King and David Woodward, and recorded by American country music artist Reba McEntire. It was released in July 1983 as the first single from the album Behind the Scene. The song reached #7 on the Billboard Hot Country Singles & Tracks chart.

== Chart performance ==
Chart (1983)	Peak position
US Hot Country Songs (Billboard)	7
Canadian RPM Country Tracks	45
