= He Broke Your Memory Last Night =

Single by Reba McEntire

from the album Just a Little Love
- B-side: "If Only"
- Released: June 1984
- Genre: Country
- Length: 2:50
- Label: MCA
- Songwriters: Bucky Jones; Dickey Lee
- Producer: Norro Wilson

Reba McEntire singles chronology
"Just a Little Love" (1984)	"He Broke Your Memory Last Night" (1984)	"How Blue" (1984)

"He Broke Your Memory Last Night" is a song written by Dickey Lee and Bucky Jones, and recorded by American country music artist Reba McEntire. It was released in June 1984 as the second single from the album Just a Little Love. The song became a top 20 hit on the American country music chart.

== Background and content ==
In 1983, Reba McEntire got an early release from recording contract with PolyGram/Mercury Records. With two number one hits, McEntire felt the need to take more control of her career and switched to MCA Records. Her first single for the label would be "Just a Little Love", which was recorded in a familiar country pop style McEntire disliked. This same formula would be repeated for her album of the same name, which included "He Broke Your Memory Last Night". The song was written by Bucky Jones and Dickey Lee. The track was then recorded in November 1983 at Music City Hall, a studio located in Nashville, Tennessee. The session was produced by Norro Wilson. AllMusic's William Ruhlmann found that the song showed evidence that McEntire was "in more of a contemporary country direction", unlike the rest of her 1984 album.

== Release and chart performance ==
"He Broke Your Memory Last Night" was first released on Just a Little Love. In June 1984, it was spawned as the album's second single. On the B-side was "If Only", which was also included on the album. It spent a total of 20 weeks on the Billboard Hot Country Singles chart, eventually reaching number 15 in September 1984. It became McEntire's major hit (and second single release) with the MCA label. In Canada, the song reached the top 20 on the RPM Country Tracks chart, climbing to number 19.

== Track listing ==
7" vinyl single

- "He Broke Your Memory Last Night" – 2:50
- "If Only" – 3:39

== Charts ==
Chart performance for "He Broke Your Memory Last Night"
Chart (1984)	Peak position
Canada Country Songs (RPM)	19
US Hot Country Songs (Billboard)	15
