= The Last One to Know (song) =

Single by Reba McEntire

from the album The Last One to Know
- B-side: "I Don't Want to Be Alone"
- Released: August 24, 1987
- Genre: Country
- Length: 3:10
- Label: MCA
- Songwriter(s): Matraca Berg; Jane Mariash
- Producer(s): Jimmy Bowen; Reba McEntire

Reba McEntire singles chronology
"One Promise Too Late" (1987)	"The Last One to Know" (1987)	"Love Will Find Its Way to You" (1988)

"The Last One to Know" is a song written by Matraca Berg and Jane Mariash, and originally recorded by Karen Brooks on her 1985 album I Will Dance with You. The song was released by American country music artist Reba McEntire in September 1987 as the first single and title track from her album The Last One to Know. It was McEntire's ninth number one country hit as a solo artist. The single went to number one for one week and spent a total of fourteen weeks on the country chart.

== Charts ==
Chart (1987)	Peak position
US Hot Country Songs (Billboard)	1
Canadian RPM Country Tracks	2
