= The Last One to Know =

Studio album by Reba McEntire
- Released: September 7, 1987
- Studio: Emerald Sound Studios (Nashville, Tennessee)
- Genre: Country
- Length: 33:09
- Label: MCA
- Producers: Jimmy Bowen; Reba McEntire

Reba McEntire chronology
Reba McEntire's Greatest Hits (1987)	The Last One to Know (1987)	Merry Christmas to You (1987)

Singles from The Last One to Know
- 1. "The Last One to Know" Released: August 1987; 2. "Love Will Find Its Way to You" Released: December 1987

Professional ratings
Review scores
Source	Rating
AllMusic	3/5 stars
Rolling Stone	(favorable)

The Last One to Know is the twelfth studio album by American country music artist Reba McEntire, released on September 7, 1987, by MCA Nashville. The title track and Love Will Find Its Way to You were both Number One singles from the album. It was also her first album to chart on the Billboard 200, in addition to peaking at #3 on Top Country Albums. "Just Across the Rio Grande" was also covered by Holly Dunn the following year in Across the Rio Grande.

== Track listing ==
No.	Title	Writer(s)	Length
1.	"The Last One to Know"	Matraca Berg; Jane Mariash	3:10
2.	"The Girl Who Has Everything"	Larry Bastian; Dewayne Blackwell	3:07
3.	"Just Across the Rio Grande"	Don Cook; Chick Rains	4:09
4.	"I Don't Want to Mention Any Names"	Larry Cordle; Lisa Palas	2:36
5.	"Someone Else"	Pat Bunch; Mary Ann Kennedy; Pam Rose	3:40
6.	"What You Gonna Do About Me"	Michael P. Heeney; David Scarlett	3:24
7.	"I Don't Want to Be Alone"	Reba McEntire	2:41
8.	"The Stairs"	Pamela Brown; David Roberts	3:01
9.	"Love Will Find Its Way to You"	Dave Loggins; J. D. Martin	3:32
10.	"I've Still Got the Love We Made"	Michael Garvin; Tom Shapiro; Chris Waters	3:11

== Personnel ==
=== Vocals ===
- Reba McEntire – lead vocals, harmony vocals
- Suzy Hoskins – harmony vocals

=== Musicians ===
- John Barlow Jarvis – acoustic piano, Yamaha DX7
- Richard Bennett – electric guitar
- Bill Cooley – acoustic guitar, electric guitar
- Fred Newell – electric guitar
- Don Potter – acoustic guitar
- Donnie LaValley – dobro, steel guitar
- Ricky Solomon – fiddle, mandolin
- David Hungate – bass
- Leland Sklar – bass
- Russ Kunkel – drums

=== Production ===
- Jimmy Bowen – producer
- Reba McEntire – producer
- Ron Treat – recording engineer
- Bob Bullock – overdub recording
- Willie Pevear – overdub recording
- Steve Tillisch – overdub recording
- Chuck Ainlay – mixing at Sound Stage Studios (Nashville, Tennessee)
- Mark J. Coddington – second engineer
- Tim Kish – second engineer
- Russ Martin – second engineer
- Marty Williams – second engineer
- Milan Bogdan – digital editing
- Glenn Meadows – mastering at Masterfonics (Nashville, Tennessee)
- Jessie Noble – project coordinator
- Katherine DeVault – design
- Simon Levy – art direction
- Jim "Señor" McGuire – photography
- Ann Payne – styling
- Bill Carter – management

== Charts ==
=== Album ===
Chart (1987)	Peak position
U.S. Billboard Top Country Albums	3
U.S. Billboard 200	102

=== Singles ===
Year	Song	Chart positions	
Year	Song	US Country	CAN Country
1987	"The Last One to Know"	1	2
1988	"Love Will Find Its Way to You"	1	1
"—" denotes releases that did not chart.

== Certifications ==
Region	Certification	Certified units/sales
United States (RIAA)	Platinum	1,000,000^{^}
^{^} Shipments figures based on certification alone.
