= Just a Little Love (song) =

Single by Reba McEntire

from the album Just a Little Love
- B-side: "If Your Heart's Not in It (What's in It for Me)"
- Released: February 4, 1984
- Genre: Country
- Length: 4:04
- Label: MCA
- Songwriter(s): Stephen Allen Davis; Dennis Morgan
- Producer(s): Norro Wilson

Reba McEntire singles chronology
"There Ain't No Future in This" (1983)	"Just a Little Love" (1984)	"He Broke Your Memory Last Night" (1984)

"Just a Little Love" is a song written by Stephen Allen Davis and Dennis Morgan, and recorded by American country music artist Reba McEntire. It was released in February 1984 as the first single and title track from the album Just a Little Love. The song reached #5 on the Billboard Hot Country Singles & Tracks chart.

== Track listing ==
CD single

1. "Just a Little Love"
2. "If Your Heart's Not in It (What's in It for Me)"

== Chart performance ==
Chart (1984)	Peak position
US Hot Country Songs (Billboard)	5
Canadian RPM Country Tracks	37
