= My Kind of Country (Reba McEntire album) =

Studio album by Reba McEntire
- Released: October 15, 1984
- Recorded: July 1984
- Studios: The Mill and GroundStar Laboratories (Nashville, Tennessee)
- Genre: Country
- Length: 28:14
- Label: MCA
- Producer: Harold Shedd

Reba McEntire chronology
Just a Little Love (1984)	My Kind of Country (1984)	The Best of Reba McEntire (1985)

Singles from My Kind of Country
- 1. "How Blue" Released: September 1984; 2. "Somebody Should Leave" Released: January 1985

Professional ratings
Review scores
Source	Rating
AllMusic	4.5/5 stars
Christgau's Consumer Guide	B+

My Kind of Country is the eighth studio album by American country music singer Reba McEntire, released October 15, 1984. It was her second studio album for MCA Records. My Kind of Country peaked at No. 13 on Billboard's (North America) Country Music Albums chart. Two tracks from the album rose to No. 1 on the Country Singles chart: "How Blue" and "Somebody Should Leave".

The track "It's Not Over (If I'm Not over You)" was first recorded by Vern Gosdin and released in 1982, and later recorded by the singer Mark Chesnutt on his 1992 album Longnecks & Short Stories, with backing vocals from Alison Krauss and Vince Gill. It reappeared on his 1997 album Thank God for Believers, from which it was released as a single in 1998.

== Track listing ==
No.	Title	Writer(s)	Length
1.	"How Blue"	John Moffat	2:42
2.	"That's What He Said"	Rick Carnes, Janis Carnes	2:30
3.	"I Want to Hear It from You"	Fred Carter Jr.	2:21
4.	"It's Not Over (If I'm Not Over You)"	Larry Kingston, Mark Wright	3:10
5.	"Somebody Should Leave"	Harlan Howard, Chick Rains	3:34
6.	"Everything but My Heart"	Graham Lyle, Troy Seals	3:10
7.	"Don't You Believe Him"	Nat Stuckey	2:19
8.	"Before I Met You"	J. William Denny, Joe "Cannonball" Lewis, Chuck Seitz	2:29
9.	"He's Only Everything"	Billy Deaton, Faron Young	3:19
10.	"You've Got Me (Right Where You Want Me)"	George Richey, Connie Smith	2:41

== Personnel ==
- Reba McEntire – vocals, backing vocals
- David Briggs – keyboards
- Mitch Humphries – keyboards
- Kenny Bell – acoustic guitar
- Jimmy Capps – acoustic guitar
- Ray Edenton – acoustic guitar
- Bobby Thompson – acoustic guitar
- Gregg Galbraith – lead guitar
- Brent Rowan – lead guitar
- Paul Worley – lead guitar
- Jerry Douglas – dobro
- Sonny Garrish – steel guitar
- Doyle Grisham – steel guitar
- Joe Osborn – bass
- Larry Paxton – bass
- Bob Wray – bass
- Eddie Bayers – drums
- Jerry Kroon – drums
- Johnny Gimble – fiddle
- Mark O'Connor – fiddle
- Craig Bickhardt – backing vocals
- Buddy Cannon – backing vocals
- Ted Hewitt – backing vocals
- Wendy Waldman – backing vocals

=== Production ===
- Harold Shedd – producer
- Jim Cotton – first engineer (tracks and overdubs)
- Ron Treat – first engineer (mix and additional overdubs)
- Bob Bullock – second engineer (tracks and overdubs)
- George Clinton – second engineer (tracks and overdubs)
- Paul Goldberg – second engineer (tracks and overdubs)
- Joe Scaife – second engineer (tracks and overdubs)
- Tim Kish – second engineer (mix and additional overdubs)
- Glenn Meadows – mastering at Masterfonics (Nashville, Tennessee)
- Vartan Kurjian – art direction
- Andy Engel – design
- Alan Messer – photography
- Bonnie Thomas – hair, make-up

CD release

- Glenn Meadows – mastering
- Milan Bogdan – digital editing
- Katie Gillon – CD coordinator
- Sherri Halford – CD coordinator
- Simon Levy – art direction
- Camille Engel – design

== Charts ==
=== Weekly charts ===
Chart (1984–1985)	Peak position
US Top Country Albums (Billboard)	13

=== Year-end charts ===
Chart (1985)	Position
US Top Country Albums (Billboard)	33

=== Singles ===
Year	Single	Peak positions	
Year	Single	US Country	CAN Country
1984	"How Blue"	1	6
1985	"Somebody Should Leave"	1	8

== Certifications ==
Region	Certification	Certified units/sales
United States (RIAA)	Gold	500,000^{^}
^{^} Shipments figures based on certification alone.
