= What Am I Gonna Do About You (song) =

Single by Reba McEntire

from the album What Am I Gonna Do About You
- B-side: "I Heard Her Crying"
- Released: September 15, 1986
- Recorded: 1986
- Genre: Country
- Length: 3:28
- Label: MCA
- Songwriters: Jim Allison; Doug Gilmore; Bob Simon
- Producers: Jimmy Bowen; Reba McEntire

Reba McEntire singles chronology
"Little Rock" (1986)	"What Am I Gonna Do About You" (1986)	"Let the Music Lift You Up" (1987)

"What Am I Gonna Do About You" is a song written by Jim Allison, Doug Gilmore, and Bob Simon. It was first recorded by American country music artist Con Hunley in 1986 on the Capitol Records label and later by Reba McEntire for her 1986 studio album of the same name. Produced by Jimmy Bowen and McEntire, it was a number one single on the Billboard Hot Country Singles & Tracks chart.

It debuted at #54 on the Hot Country Single's chart for the week of October 11, 1986 and peaked at #1 for the week of January 17, 1987.

== Background ==
"What Am I Gonna Do About You" was recorded by Con Hunley in 1985 on the Capitol Records label with "Lord, She Sure Looks Good Tonight" on the B-side. His version was released on the Capitol #5525, spending 15 weeks on the country charts and peaking at #48.

It was recorded by Reba McEntire in 1986 at the Sound Stage Studio in Nashville, Tennessee.

== Content ==
The song is characterized as a slow ballad, which describes how a woman tries to recover from a love affair, saying throughout the song, "what am I gonna do about you." The song's chorus is also repeated throughout the song:

What in the world am I gonna do about you
Oh your memory keeps coming back from out of the blue
Oh well I try and I try, but I still can't believe that we're through
So tell me what in the world am I gonna do about you
What am I gonna do about you

== Critical reception ==
Upon its release and many years afterward, "What Am I Gonna Do About You" gained positive reviews. Although William Ruhlmann of Allmusic found the song not to have the characteristics of her previous releases, he received the song well. Ruhlmann found it to be nearly similar to that of her number one single, "Whoever's in New England," stating, "the title song had something of the feel of "Whoever's in New England" in its portrayal of a woman trying to recover from a painfully ended love affair."

== Release and reception ==
"What Am I Gonna Do About You" was released as McEntire's final single of the year September 15, 1986. The song became a preface of her 1986 album of the same name (her second studio album of the year) and became a major hit in the United States and Canada. In the United States, the song reached number one on the Billboard Hot Country Singles & Tracks the following year on January 17, 1987, becoming her seventh song to top the charts. The song's success helped the album certify "Gold" (and eventually "Platinum") by the Recording Industry Association of America. It also became McEntire's first single to top the Canadian RPM Country Tracks charts, reaching number one January 24.

== Charts ==
=== Weekly charts ===
Chart (1986–1987)	Peak position
US Hot Country Songs (Billboard)	1
Canadian RPM Country Tracks	1

=== Year-end charts ===
Chart (1987)	Position
US Hot Country Songs (Billboard)	3
