= What Am I Gonna Do About You =

Studio album by Reba McEntire
- Released: September 2, 1986
- Recorded: July 1986
- Studio: Sound Stage Studios (Nashville, Tennessee)
- Genre: Country
- Length: 35:20
- Label: MCA
- Producers: Reba McEntire; Jimmy Bowen

Reba McEntire chronology
Whoever's in New England (1986)	What Am I Gonna Do About You (1986)	Reba McEntire's Greatest Hits (1987)

Singles from What Am I Gonna Do About You
- 1. "What Am I Gonna Do About You" Released: September 1986; 2. "Let the Music Lift You Up" Released: January 1987; 3. "One Promise Too Late" Released: May 1987

Professional ratings
Review scores
Source	Rating
Allmusic	4/5 stars

What Am I Gonna Do About You is the eleventh studio album by American country music artist Reba McEntire. The album was released September 2, 1986 on MCA Records and was produced by McEntire and Jimmy Bowen. It was her second #1 album on the Billboard country charts, containing two #1 singles, What Am I Gonna Do About You and One Promise Too Late. The opening track "Why Not Tonight" was also featured on the end credits of the 1990 film Tremors which was her film debut.

The album debuted at #36 on the Country Albums chart for the week of October 25, 1986, and peaked at #1 for the week of January 21, 1987. It stayed at the top for 3 consecutive weeks.

== Track listing ==
No.	Title	Writer(s)	Length
1.	"Why Not Tonight"	Jon Vezner; David Stringfellow; Nancy Montgomery	3:13
2.	"What Am I Gonna Do About You"	Doug Gilmore; Bob Simon; Jim Allison	3:26
3.	"Lookin' for a New Love Story"	Dave Loggins; Donny Lowery	4:21
4.	"Take Me Back"	John Hobbs; Jerry Fuller	3:06
5.	"My Mind Is on You"	Loggins; Don Schlitz	4:21
6.	"Let the Music Lift You Up"	Troy Seals; Eddie Setser	4:24
7.	"I Heard Her Cryin'"	Karen Staley	2:59
8.	"No Such Thing"	Paul Nelson; Gene Nelson	2:37
9.	"One Promise Too Late"	Loggins; Schlitz; Lisa Silver	3:28
10.	"Till It Snows in Mexico"	Gordon Payne; Roger Lavoie	3:25

== Personnel ==
- Reba McEntire – lead vocals, harmony vocals
- John Hobbs – acoustic piano, organ
- Bill Cooley – electric guitar
- Don Potter – acoustic guitar
- Billy Joe Walker Jr. – acoustic guitar, electric guitar
- Reggie Young – electric guitar
- Donnie LaValley – steel guitar
- David Hungate – bass guitar
- Eddie Bayers – drums
- Matt Betton – drums
- Ricky Solomon – fiddle
- Suzy Hoskins – harmony vocals
- Pake McEntire – harmony vocals

== Production ==
- Jimmy Bowen – producer
- Reba McEntire – producer, make-up
- Ron Treat – recording engineer
- Chuck Ainlay – overdub recording
- Willie Pevear – overdub recording
- Steve Tillisch – overdub recording
- Bob Bullock – mixing
- Mark J. Coddington – second engineer
- Tim Kish – second engineer
- Russ Martin – second engineer
- Glenn Meadows – mastering at Masterfonics (Nashville, Tennessee)
- Simon Levy – art direction
- Tal Howell – design
- Jim "Señor" McGuire – photography
- Ann Payne – stylist
- Terry Barth – hair
- Bill Carter – management
- Kathy Woods – management

== Charts ==
=== Album ===
Chart (1986)	Peak position
U.S. Billboard Top Country Albums	1

=== Singles ===
Year	Single	Peak positions	
Year	Single	US Country	CAN Country
1986	"What Am I Gonna Do About You"	1	1
1987	"Let the Music Lift You Up"	4	5
1987	"One Promise Too Late"	1	1

=== Certifications and sales ===
Region	Certification	Certified units/sales
United States (RIAA)	Gold	500,000^{^}
^{^} Shipments figures based on certification alone.
