= You're the First Time I've Thought About Leaving =

Single by Reba McEntire

from the album Unlimited
- B-side: "Up to Heaven"
- Released: January 1983
- Genre: Country
- Length: 2:52
- Label: Mercury
- Songwriter(s): Kerry Chater, Dickey Lee
- Producer(s): Jerry Kennedy

Reba McEntire singles chronology
"Can't Even Get the Blues" (1982)	"You're the First Time I've Thought About Leaving" (1983)	"Why Do We Want (What We Know We Can't Have)" (1983)

"You're the First Time I've Thought About Leaving" is a song written by Dickey Lee and Kerry Chater, and recorded by American country music artist Reba McEntire. It was released in January 1983 as the third single from the album Unlimited. The song was McEntire's second number one on the country chart. The single stayed at number one for one week and spent a total of fourteen weeks on the country chart.

== Charts ==
=== Weekly charts ===
Chart (1983)	Peak position
US Hot Country Songs (Billboard)	1
Canadian RPM Country Tracks	5

=== Year-end charts ===
Chart (1983)	Position
US Hot Country Songs (Billboard)	7
