= One Promise Too Late =

Single by Reba McEntire

from the album What Am I Gonna Do About You
- B-side: "Why Not Tonight"
- Released: April 27, 1987
- Genre: Country
- Length: 3:28
- Label: MCA
- Songwriters: Dave Loggins; Lisa Silver; Don Schlitz
- Producers: Jimmy Bowen; Reba McEntire

Reba McEntire singles chronology
"Let the Music Lift You Up" (1987)	"One Promise Too Late" (1987)	"The Last One to Know" (1987)

"One Promise Too Late" is a song written by Dave Loggins, Don Schlitz and Lisa Silver, and recorded by American country music artist Reba McEntire. It was released in May 1987 as the third single from the album What Am I Gonna Do About You. The song was McEntire's eighth number-one country single as a solo artist. The single went to number one for one week and spent a total of fourteen weeks on the country chart.

== Content ==
The song tells the story of a woman who meets a man and falls in love, but she is already married and refuses to break her promise to her husband. She expresses regret that the man hadn't entered her life at a time when she could act on her love for him. Despite her inability to have the man of her dreams, she has no regret she met him, and he will live forever in her mind.

== Charts ==
=== Weekly charts ===
Chart (1987)	Peak position
US Hot Country Songs (Billboard)	1
Canadian RPM Country Tracks	1

=== Year-end charts ===
Chart (1987)	Position
US Hot Country Songs (Billboard)	17
