= How Blue =

Single by Reba McEntire

from the album My Kind of Country
- B-side: "That's What He Said"
- Released: September 24, 1984
- Recorded: 1984
- Genre: Country
- Length: 2:42
- Label: MCA
- Songwriter: John Moffat
- Producer: Harold Shedd

Reba McEntire singles chronology
| "He Broke Your Memory Last Night" (1984) | "How Blue" (1984) | "Somebody Should Leave" (1985) |

"How Blue" is a song written by John Moffat, and recorded by American country music artist Reba McEntire. It was released in September 1984 as the first single from the album My Kind of Country. It was her third number one single on the Billboard country music chart and would be the first of a series of number one singles during the 1980s and 1990s.

== Background ==
"How Blue" was recorded at the MCA studio in Nashville, Tennessee in 1984. The song was one of several new tracks released on McEntire's second MCA album, My Kind of Country, which mainly included cover versions of traditional country songs. The song itself was considered a departure from any of McEntire's previously released singles, as it contained a traditional sound, with fiddle and steel guitar in the background.

== Cover versions ==
Country music singer Dolly Parton covered the song from the television special CMT Giants: Reba

== Critical reception ==
Since its release as a single, "How Blue" has received positive critical reception from critics. Kurt Wolff of the book, Country Music: The Rough Guide called the song, "one of rootsiest songs she has ever recorded."

== Release and chart performance ==
"How Blue" was released on September 24, 1984 on MCA Nashville Records. The song reached number one on the Billboard Magazine country music chart months before My Kind of Country's release, reaching the top spot in January 1985. The song also peaked at number 6 on the Canadian RPM Country Tracks charts around the same time. The song helped McEntire to win the Country Music Association Awards' "Female Vocalist of the Year" honor and was also regarded as a "new traditionalist" by many music critics, along with country artists, George Strait and Ricky Skaggs.

=== Charts ===
| Chart (1984–1985) | Peak position |
|---|---|
| US Hot Country Songs (Billboard) | 1 |
| Canadian RPM Country Tracks | 6 |
