= Somebody Should Leave =

1985 single by Reba McEntire

Single by Reba McEntire

from the album My Kind of Country
- B-side: "Don't You Believe Him"
- Released: January 28, 1985
- Recorded: 1984
- Genre: Country
- Length: 3:34
- Label: MCA
- Songwriter(s): Harlan Howard; Chick Rains
- Producer(s): Harold Shedd

Reba McEntire singles chronology
"How Blue" (1984)	"Somebody Should Leave" (1985)	"Have I Got a Deal for You" (1985)

"Somebody Should Leave" is a song written by Harlan Howard and Chick Rains, and recorded by American country music artist, Reba McEntire. It was released in January 1985 as the second single from her album My Kind of Country. It was McEntire's second number one single in a row on the Billboard country music chart, being the first of a series of number one singles McEntire would acquire under MCA.

== Background ==
Like her previous single, "Somebody Should Leave" was recorded in 1984 at MCA studio in Nashville, Tennessee. It was one of several new tracks that would appear on McEntire's My Kind of Country album later in the year, which mainly comprised cover versions of country songs.

== Content ==
The song is a ballad describing a woman who finds herself in a loveless relationship with her husband. The female narrator realizes a divorce is needed, but they are faced with a dilemma, as she states in the song, "he needs the kids and they need me." The song's chorus further explains the storyline:

Somebody should leave but which one should it be
You need the kids and they need me
Somebody should leave but we hate to give in
We keep hopin' somehow we might need each other again

== Critical reception ==
Much like "How Blue", "Somebody Should Leave" also gained fairly positive reviews from music critics since its release. William Ruhlmann of Allmusic praised the track, saying, "a characteristically direct Howard story song about an impending divorce a couple was studiously avoiding..." The website, My Kind of Country gave "Somebody Should Leave" high critical praise, calling it a "tearjerker". The website further went on to praise the song and the story behind it, saying, "An instant classic, with an emotionally charged vocal performance, this is the centerpiece of the album. Reba approached Harlan Howard when she was looking for material for the album. He played her a song that she didn’t like, so she turned it down as politely as she could. Howard responded that he was testing her to see if she could distinguish between a good song and a bad one — and to see if she had the nerve to tell him that she didn’t like the song. Reba had passed the test, and being allowed to record “Somebody Should Leave” was her reward." Author, Kurt Wolff of Country Music: The Rough Guide commented that the song is "weepy, it exhibits tasteful restraints..."

== Release and chart performance ==
"Somebody Should Leave" was released as a single January 28, 1985, a few weeks after her previous single, "How Blue" peaked on the Billboard chart. The song became McEntire's second number one single on the Billboard Hot Country Singles & Tracks chart in a row, reaching the top spot by May 1985. With the help of the album and the single itself, McEntire would win the Country Music Association's "Female Vocalist of the Year," her second honor from the association. The song was considered to have a traditional sound, which categorized McEntire as a "new traditionalist," a similar title to that of George Strait and Ricky Skaggs.

=== Weekly charts ===
Chart (1985)	Peak position
US Hot Country Songs (Billboard)	1
Canadian RPM Country Tracks	8

=== Year-end charts ===
Chart (1985)	Position
US Hot Country Songs (Billboard)	44
