= Today All Over Again =

Single by Reba McEntire

from the album Heart to Heart
- B-side: "Look at the One (Who's Been Lookin' at You)"
- Released: July 4, 1981
- Genre: Country
- Length: 3:17
- Label: Mercury
- Songwriter(s): Bobby Harden, Lola Jean Dillon
- Producer(s): Jerry Kennedy

Reba McEntire singles chronology
"I Don't Think Love Ought to Be That Way" (1981)	"Today All Over Again" (1981)	"Only You (And You Alone)" (1981)

"Today All Over Again" is a song written by Bobby Harden and Lola Jean Dillon, and recorded by American country music artist Reba McEntire. It was released in July 1981 as the first single from the album Heart to Heart. The song reached #5 on the Billboard Hot Country Singles & Tracks chart. It became her first single to ever reach the top five. Ricky Skaggs and Susie McEntire provided backing vocals.

== Chart performance ==
Chart (1981)	Peak position
US Hot Country Songs (Billboard)	5
Canadian RPM Country Tracks	8
