= I'm Not That Lonely Yet =

Single by Reba McEntire

from the album Unlimited
- B-side: "Over, Under and Around"
- Released: June 5, 1982
- Recorded: 1981
- Genre: Country
- Length: 2:45
- Label: Mercury
- Songwriter(s): Bill Rice, Sharon Vaughn
- Producer(s): Jerry Kennedy

Reba McEntire singles chronology
"Only You (And You Alone)" (1981)	"I'm Not That Lonely Yet" (1982)	"Can't Even Get the Blues" (1982)

"I'm Not That Lonely Yet" is a song written by Bill Rice and Sharon Vaughn, and recorded by American country music artist Reba McEntire. It was released in June 1982 as the first single from the album Unlimited. The song reached #3 on the Billboard Hot Country Singles & Tracks chart for the week of September 4, 1982.

== Background ==
Sharon Vaughn, who wrote "I'm Not That Lonely Yet" with Bill Rice, envisioned the lyrics to the song as though they were a movie scene, likening her writing process to that of a cinematographer and saying, "So, I saw this woman asked to dance on a dance floor. She has a broken heart. She's in a blue dress, and I knew exactly what she was wearing. I knew the color of her fingernail polish down to the most minute detail. I feel like as a songwriter, if you don't know your person about whom you're writing that intimately, then you're not inside that person's life. Wait until you do."

== Charts ==
=== Weekly charts ===
Chart (1982)	Peak position
US Hot Country Songs (Billboard)	3
Canadian RPM Country Tracks	11

=== Year-end charts ===
Chart (1982)	Position
US Hot Country Songs (Billboard)	16
