= Can't Even Get the Blues =

Single by Reba McEntire

from the album Unlimited
- B-side: "Sweet Dreams"
- Released: October 2, 1982 (U.S.)
- Recorded: November 11, 1981
- Studio: Woodland (Nashville, Tennessee)
- Genre: Country
- Length: 2:25
- Label: Mercury
- Songwriter(s): Rick Carnes, Tom Damphier
- Producer(s): Jerry Kennedy

Reba McEntire singles chronology
| "I'm Not That Lonely Yet" (1982) | "Can't Even Get the Blues" (1982) | "You're the First Time I've Thought About Leaving" (1983) |

"Can't Even Get the Blues" is a song written by Tom Damphier and Rick Carnes, and recorded by American country music artist Reba McEntire. It was released in September 1982 as the second single from the album Unlimited. The song was McEntire's fourteenth country hit and her first number one country hit. The single went to number one for one week and spent a total of fourteen weeks on the country chart.

She performed the song on the 1982 Country Music Association Awards (CMA Awards).

== Charts ==
| Chart (1982–1983) | Peak position |
|---|---|
| US Hot Country Songs (Billboard) | 1 |
