= (You Lift Me) Up to Heaven =

Single by Reba McEntire

from the album Feel the Fire
- B-side: "Rain Fallin'"
- Released: June 14, 1980
- Genre: Country
- Length: 2:45
- Label: Mercury
- Songwriters: Johnny MacRae; Bob Morrison; Bill Zerface; Jim Zerface
- Producer: Jerry Kennedy

Reba McEntire singles chronology
"(I Still Long to Hold You) Now and Then" (1980)	"(You Lift Me) Up to Heaven" (1980)	"I Can See Forever in Your Eyes" (1980)

"(You Lift Me) Up to Heaven" is a song recorded by American country music artist Reba McEntire. It was released in June 1980 as the first single from the album Feel the Fire. The song reached #8 on the Billboard Hot Country Singles & Tracks chart. It was written by Johnny MacRae, Bob Morrison, Bill Zerface and Jim Zerface.

McEntire promoted the song by singing it on famous television shows in 1980 including Hee Haw and Pop Goes The Country. She also sang it at the 1980 Academy of Country Music Awards.

== Content ==
The singer describes her lover as lifting her up to Heaven. She compares the experience as taking her higher than the mountains of Colorado.

== Chart performance ==
Chart (1980)	Peak position
US Hot Country Songs (Billboard)	8
Canadian RPM Country Tracks	22
