= Bob Morrison (songwriter) =

American country songwriter

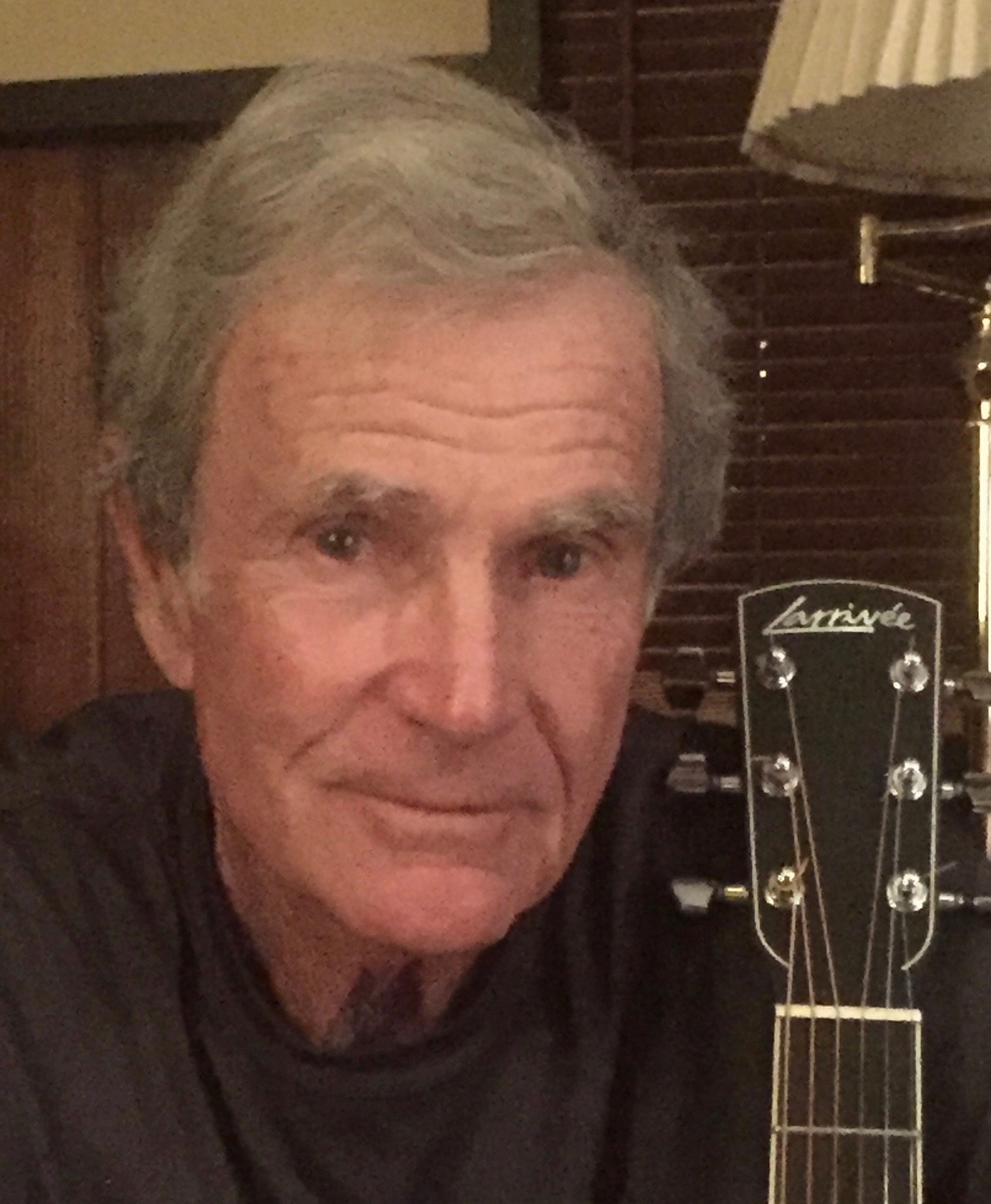

Background information
- Born: Robert Edwin Morrison; August 6, 1942 (age 84); Biloxi, Mississippi, U.S.
- Genres: Country; pop
- Occupations: Songwriter, musician
- Instrument: Guitar
- Years active: 1965—present
- Labels: Monument, Capitol, Columbia

Robert Edwin Morrison (born August 6, 1942) is an American country songwriter based in Nashville. More than 350 of his songs have been recorded. His most successful compositions are the Grammy-winning Kenny Rogers song, "You Decorated My Life" and the Grammy-nominated "Lookin' for Love," the theme song for the 1980 John Travolta film, Urban Cowboy, recorded by Johnny Lee.

In 1980, Morrison was awarded "Songwriter of the Year" by the Nashville Songwriters Association International (NSAI). He earned more than 40 songwriting citations from the American Society of Composers, Authors and Publishers (ASCAP) and was ASCAP's Country Songwriter of the Year in 1978, 1980, 1981 and 1982. He was inducted into the Nashville Songwriters Hall of Fame in 2016.

== Early life ==
Morrison was born in Biloxi, Mississippi. His father was a jukebox operator who left the house every two weeks to go to New Orleans to pick up a new stack of 45s to restock the local jukeboxes. Morrison received an athletic scholarship (track) to Mississippi State University where his squad won the SEC championship. He graduated with a degree in nuclear engineering in 1965.

A self-taught guitarist, Morrison began playing in local bands at age 15 and later performed in clubs as a solo folk singer. While still in college, he came to the attention of producer and record executive John Hammond who signed him to record several singles for Columbia Records. One of those singles, released in 1965, was "The Shadow of Your Smile (Love Theme from The Sandpiper)". Morrison was the first singer to record it, but his version was eclipsed by subsequent recordings by Tony Bennett and other established artists. Morrison moved to Hollywood in 1967 and worked as a contract actor for Screen Gems and released an album on Capitol Records, entitled Friends of Mine, which included his original songs. He had a few successes, but after seven years, he gave up his quest for a motion picture career and left Los Angeles.

== Career ==
In 1973 Morrison moved to Nashville with the aspiration of becoming a recording artist; he released an album Home Again (Monument/MG7618) in the pop-rock genre without much success. He got a job as staff writer for Bob Beckham at Nashville's Combine Music and was paired up to write with Johnny MacRae, whom he considered a mentor. In 1977, Morrison told the Tennessean, "Nashville was kind of the final stand for me... I knew I didn't want to be an engineer, and for a while I thought I wanted to become an actor. But I saw quickly that your body is a very expendable commodity, while songs that you write last forever." His first hit as a songwriter was "The River's Too Wide", recorded by Olivia Newton-John and Sammy Davis Jr. Some of his other early hits were "Angels, Roses and Rain" (Dickey Lee), "You Lift Me Up to Heaven" (Reba McEntire) and "You're the One" (Oak Ridge Boys). ABC used "You're the One" as the slogan for its national promotion in 1978, adapting it to "We're the One!".

Morrison's Grammy-winning song "You Decorated My Life" began as a poem written by Debbie Hupp, a Kentucky mother of five who began writing songs while working in a liquor distillery as a nightwatchman. (Note: Debbie Hupp became a successful songwriter and was board member of the Nashville Songwriters Association International in 1986. Some of her songs are here: Category: Songs written by Debbie Hupp.) Hupp and Morrison developed a writing relationship. She brought Morrison the first verse and the title, "You Decorated My Life". Morrison supplied the direction for the second verse, and wrote the chorus melody; together they finished the lyric. Morrison suggested the song to Dottie West, who declined it, but suggested it for Kenny Rogers. Rogers' recording, released in 1979, became a No. 1 hit on the Billboard Country Singles chart, and No. 2 on the Adult Contemporary chart.

Morrison's song "Lookin' for Love" was one of the few huge hits that originated from unsolicited amateur songwriters. Two Gulfport, Mississippi school teachers, Patti Ryan and Wanda Mallette, had songwriting aspirations. When they saw Morrison on television accepting an award for his song "You Decorated My Life", they realized Mallette's husband had gone to school with him, so they sent some of their songs to Morrison; he rejected them. After a while, they sent some more songs that showed some improvement and among them was "Lookin' for Love". Morrison revised a couple of lyric lines, cut the bridge in half and changed the chorus melody of the song slightly. He gave the tape to a friend in Hollywood who dropped it off at Paramount Pictures. It was chosen by Irving Azoff for the film Urban Cowboy and was sung on the soundtrack by Johnny Lee. It rose to No. 1 on the country charts and No. 5 on the pop charts in 1980.

Other noted songs by Morrison are Gary Morris' "The Love She Found in Me", Conway Twitty's "Don't Call Him a Cowboy", and Highway 101's "Whiskey, If You Were a Woman". On the craft of songwriting, Morrison stated "Inspiration is fine, but very undependable. It's a very demanding life, and even when you're successful, you're not sure you want it."

== Awards and honors ==
Over 350 songs written or co-written by Morrison have been recorded. (See: Category: Songs written by Bob Morrison (songwriter).) Morrison was ASCAP's "Country Songwriter of the Year" in 1978, 1980, 1981 and 1982 His songs have been recorded by artists including The Carpenters, Bobby Vinton, Highway 101, Barbara Mandrell, Jerry Lee Lewis and Bobby Goldsboro. Morrison was awarded "Songwriter of the Year"(1980) by the Nashville Songwriters Association International (NSAI) and, as of 2018, has earned 43 ASCAP songwriting citations. He was inducted into the Nashville Songwriters Hall of Fame in 2016. On the subject of composing songs, Morrison said the inherent constant rejection is hard to overcome. "The enjoyment comes in seeing the results. If you can make people feel something — even if it's rage — then you've done something," he told a reporter. "To me, these songs of mine are like little children going out into the world...some may be great, and others might fall flat— you just never know".

== Personal life ==
Morrison retired in 2005. He has remained dedicated to physical fitness; he plays golf and is one of Nashville's celebrity tennis players. In 2020, he published the book The Aging Train: How You Can Slow It Down.
