= 50 Greatest Hits =

Greatest hits album by Reba McEntire
- Released: October 28, 2008
- Recorded: 1984–2007
- Genres: Country, pop, rock
- Length: 3:03:49
- Label: MCA Nashville
- Producer: Various original producers

Reba McEntire chronology
| Love Revival (2008) | 50 Greatest Hits (2008) | Keep On Loving You (2009) |

Professional ratings
Review scores
| Source | Rating |
|---|---|
| AllMusic | 4/5 stars |
| Country Weekly | 4.5/5 stars |

50 Greatest Hits is a three-disc compilation from country music singer Reba McEntire. The album's release was announced in August 2008 on her official website. It was also her last studio album for MCA Records, a label she had been with since 1984, the album features 20 #1 hits and 46 Top 10 singles. It was released on October 28, 2008, in the United States and Canada a week later. The album debuted at #67 on the Billboard Top Country Albums chart for the week of November 15, 2008, and it peaked at #41 for the week of February 20, 2010. The album stayed on the chart's for 35 weeks.

== Track listing ==
=== Disc one ===
| No. | Title | Writer(s) | Length |
|---|---|---|---|
| 1. | "How Blue" | John Moffat | 2:41 |
| 2. | "Somebody Should Leave" | Harlan Howard, Chick Rains | 3:32 |
| 3. | "Have I Got a Deal for You" | Michael P. Heeney, Jackson Leap | 2:47 |
| 4. | "Only in My Mind" | Reba McEntire | 3:41 |
| 5. | "Whoever's in New England" | Kendal Franchesci, Quentin Powers | 3:23 |
| 6. | "Little Rock" | Pat McManus, Bob DiPiero, Gerry House | 3:07 |
| 7. | "What Am I Gonna Do About You" | Doug Gilmore, Bob Simon, Jim Allison | 3:30 |
| 8. | "Let the Music Lift You Up" | Troy Seals, Eddie Setser | 4:28 |
| 9. | "One Promise Too Late" | Dave Loggins, Lisa Silver, Schlitz | 3:25 |
| 10. | "The Last One to Know" | Matraca Berg, Jane Mariash | 3:14 |
| 11. | "Love Will Find Its Way to You" | Loggins, J. D. Martin | 3:36 |
| 12. | "Sunday Kind of Love" | Barbara Belle, Anita Leonard, Louis Prima, Stan Rhodes | 3:04 |
| 13. | "I Know How He Feels" | Rick Bowles, Will Robinson | 3:20 |
| 14. | "New Fool at an Old Game" | Steve Bogard, Rick Giles, Sheila Stephen | 3:50 |
| 15. | "Cathy's Clown" | Don Everly | 3:01 |
| 16. | "'Til Love Comes Again" | Bob Regan, Ed Hill | 3:42 |
| 17. | "Walk On" | Steve Dean, Lonnie Williams | 3:13 |

=== Disc two ===
| No. | Title | Writer(s) | Length |
|---|---|---|---|
| 1. | "You Lie" | Fischer, Roberts, Black | 3:55 |
| 2. | "Rumor Has It" | Bruce Burch, Vern Dant, Larry Shell | 3:47 |
| 3. | "Fancy" | Bobbie Gentry | 4:59 |
| 4. | "Fallin' Out of Love" | Jon Ims | 4:37 |
| 5. | "For My Broken Heart" | Liz Hengber, Keith Palmer | 4:19 |
| 6. | "Is There Life Out There" | Susan Longacre, Rick Giles | 3:55 |
| 7. | "The Night the Lights Went Out in Georgia" | Bobby Russell | 4:17 |
| 8. | "The Greatest Man I Never Knew" | Richard Leigh, Layng Martine Jr. | 3:16 |
| 9. | "Take It Back" | Kristy Jackson | 3:17 |
| 10. | "The Heart Won't Lie" (duet with Vince Gill) | Kim Carnes, Donna Terry Weiss | 3:20 |
| 11. | "It's Your Call" | Bruce Burch, Shawna Harrington-Burkhart, Hengber | 3:08 |
| 12. | "Does He Love You" (duet with Linda Davis) | Sandy Knox, Billy Stritch | 4:19 |
| 13. | "Why Haven't I Heard from You" | Knox, T.W. Hale | 3:27 |
| 14. | "She Thinks His Name Was John" | Knox, Steve Rosen | 4:22 |
| 15. | "Till You Love Me" | DiPiero, Gary Burr | 3:50 |
| 16. | "The Heart Is a Lonely Hunter" | Mark D. Sanders, Kim Williams, Hill | 3:50 |
| 17. | "And Still" | Hengber, Tommy Lee James | 3:27 |

=== Disc three ===
| No. | Title | Writer(s) | Length |
|---|---|---|---|
| 1. | "Ring on Her Finger, Time on Her Hands" | Don Goodman, Pam Rose, Mary Ann Kennedy | 4:14 |
| 2. | "Starting Over Again" | Bruce Sudano, Donna Summer | 4:11 |
| 3. | "The Fear of Being Alone" | Walt Aldridge, Bruce Miller | 3:02 |
| 4. | "How Was I to Know" | Cathy Majeski, Sunny Russ, Stephony Smith | 3:41 |
| 5. | "I'd Rather Ride Around with You" | Mark D. Sanders, Tim Nichols | 4:07 |
| 6. | "What If It's You" | Robert Ellis Orrall, Majeski | 4:07 |
| 7. | "If You See Him/If You See Her" (duet with Brooks & Dunn) | Jennifer Kimball, James, Terry McBride | 3:55 |
| 8. | "Forever Love" | Hengber, Deanna Bryant, Russ | 3:52 |
| 9. | "Wrong Night" | Bowles, Josh Leo | 2:51 |
| 10. | "One Honest Heart" | David Malloy, Gary Baker, Frank J. Myers | 3:53 |
| 11. | "What Do You Say" | Michael Dulaney, Neil Thrasher | 3:28 |
| 12. | "I'll Be" | Diane Warren | 4:23 |
| 13. | "I'm a Survivor" | Shelby Kennedy, Philip White | 3:07 |
| 14. | "Somebody" | Dave Berg, Sam Tate, Annie Tate | 3:50 |
| 15. | "He Gets That from Me" | Steven Dale Jones, White | 3:39 |
| 16. | "Because of You" (duet with Kelly Clarkson) | Kelly Clarkson, Ben Moody, David Hodges | 3:45 |

== Charts ==
| Chart (2008–2015) | Peak position |
|---|---|
| UK Country Compilation Albums (OCC) | 18 |
| US Top Country Albums (Billboard) | 41 |
