= Reba Number 1's =

Reba #1's

Compilation album by Reba McEntire
- Released: November 22, 2005
- Genre: Country
- Length: 2:10:43
- Label: MCA
- Producer: Reba McEntire; Buddy Cannon; Tony Brown; Norro Wilson; Jerry Kennedy; John Guess; Harold Shedd; Tim DuBois; David Malloy

Reba McEntire chronology
Room to Breathe (2003)	Reba #1's (2005)	20th Century Masters – The Millennium Collection: The Best of Reba McEntire (2007)

Singles from Reba #1's
- 1. "You're Gonna Be (Always Loved by Me)" Released: August 29, 2005; 2. "Love Needs a Holiday" Released: January 30, 2006

Professional ratings
Review scores
Source	Rating
Allmusic	5/5 stars

Reba #1's is a double-disc compilation album by American country music artist Reba McEntire. It was released on November 22, 2005, via MCA Nashville to celebrate her thirty years in the music industry. Unlike previous compilation albums, Reba #1's is the first to include material from both her MCA catalog and her early time at Mercury Records. The compilation includes 33 of McEntire's singles, of which 22 topped Billboard's Hot Country Songs chart.

The compilation received widespread acclaim from music critics, with critics noting McEntire's vast catalog. This compilation was a big success, debuting at number three on the Top Country Albums chart and number 12 on the Billboard 200. As of April 2017, the compilation has sold 1,195,800 copies in the United States, having gone on to be certified 2× Platinum by the RIAA due to it being a double-disc project.

Two new songs were specifically recorded for this compilation. "You're Gonna Be" (re-titled as "You're Gonna Be (Always Loved By Me)" for its single release) was a moderate hit, peaking at number 33 on the Hot Country Songs chart. The Tim Menzies and Tony Haselden-penned track, "Love Needs a Holiday", peaked at number 60, becoming McEntire's worst performing single since the 1970s. Both singles were accompanied by music videos.

== Content ==
Reba #1's includes 33 of McEntire's singles. Of the 33 singles included, 22 of those singles ("Can't Even Get the Blues", "You're the First Time I've Thought About Leaving", "How Blue", "Somebody Should Leave", "Whoever's in New England", "Little Rock", "What Am I Gonna Do About You", "One Promise Too Late", "The Last One to Know", "Love Will Find Its Way to You", "I Know How He Feels", "New Fool at an Old Game", "Cathy's Clown", "You Lie", "For My Broken Heart", "Is There Life Out There", "The Heart Won't Lie", "Does He Love You", "The Heart Is a Lonely Hunter", "How Was I to Know", "If You See Him/If You See Her", and "Somebody") topped the US Billboard Hot Country Songs chart; the remaining 11 topped either the country charts of Radio & Records or the Gavin Report.

Two new songs were specifically recorded. The first is "You're Gonna Be (Always Loved by Me)", written by Danny Orton and Dennis Matkosky. Lyrically, the song is "saturated with mother-to-child devotion" and is about a first-time mom looking to her baby. Although she is scared of making mistakes, she guarantees to her child that they'll always be loved by her. The other is "Love Needs a Holiday", an up-tempo track that "treats romantic doldrums with just a dash of humor."

== Singles ==
"You're Gonna Be (Always Loved by Me)" was released on August 29, 2005 as the lead single from the compilation. It debuted on the US Hot Country Songs chart the week of September 17, 2005, at number 52, the second highest debut of the week. It reached the top forty for the week of October 15, 2005, becoming McEntire's 79th consecutive top forty hit. It reached a peak position of number 33 on the chart the week of November 19, 2005, becoming her lowest charting single since her rendition of "Sweet Music Man" reached number 33 in 2002. It spent 14 weeks in total. "Love Needs a Holiday" would be released on January 30, 2006, as the second and final single. It spent a single week on the Hot Country Songs chart, debuting and peaking at number 60 on February 4, 2006; it not only broke McEntire's record of top-forty hits but also became her first single to chart outside the top-forty since "Glad I Waited Just for You" from her eponymous debut album only peaked at number 88 in 1977.

== Commercial performance ==
Reba #1's debuted at number three on the US Top Country Albums chart behind Kenny Chesney's The Road and the Radio (2005) and Carrie Underwood's Some Hearts (2005), selling 117,000 copies in its first week. It is her highest charting project since her previous compilation album Greatest Hits Volume III: I'm a Survivor (2001) debuted at number one. In that same week, it debuted at number 12 on the Billboard 200, marking her highest charting album since If You See Him (1998) debuted at number eight. In total, the compilation would spend 102 weeks on the former chart and 21 weeks on the latter.

== Track listing ==
Disc one
No.	Title	Writer(s)	Producer(s)	Length
1.	"You're Gonna Be (Always Loved by Me)" (New recording)	Danny Orton; Dennis Matkosky	Reba McEntire; Buddy Cannon	3:55
2.	"Can't Even Get the Blues" (from Unlimited)	Tom Damphler; Rick Carnes	Jerry Kennedy	2:30
3.	"You're the First Time I've Thought About Leaving" (from Unlimited)	Dickey Lee; Kerry Chater	Kennedy	2:54
4.	"How Blue" (from My Kind of Country)	John Moffat	Harold Shedd	2:43
5.	"Somebody Should Leave" (from My Kind of Country)	Harlan Howard; Chick Rains	Shedd	3:34
6.	"Whoever's in New England" (from Whoever's in New England)	Kendal Franceschi; Quentin Powers	Jimmy Bowen; McEntire	3:25
7.	"Little Rock" (from Whoever's in New England)	Pat McManus; Bob DiPiero; Gerry House	Bowen; McEntire	3:08
8.	"What Am I Gonna Do About You" (from What Am I Gonna Do About You)	Doug Gilmore; Bob Simon; Jim Allison	Bowen; McEntire	3:31
9.	"One Promise Too Late" (from What Am I Gonna Do About You)	Dave Loggins; Don Schlitz; Lisa Silver	Bowen; McEntire	3:29
10.	"The Last One to Know" (from The Last One to Know)	Matraca Berg; Jane Mariash	Bowen; McEntire	3:18
11.	"Love Will Find Its Way to You" (from The Last One to Know)	Loggins; J. D. Martin	Bowen; McEntire	3:39
12.	"I Know How He Feels" (from Reba)	Rick Bowles; Will Robinson	Bowen; McEntire	3:20
13.	"New Fool at an Old Game" (from Reba)	Steve Bogard; Rick Giles; Sheila Stephen	Bowen; McEntire	3:51
14.	"Cathy's Clown" (from Sweet Sixteen)	Don Everly	Bowen; McEntire	3:04
15.	"Walk On" (from Sweet Sixteen)	Steve Dean; Lonnie Williams	Bowen; McEntire	3:17
16.	"You Lie" (from Rumor Has It)	Bobby Fischer; Charlie Black; Austin Roberts	Tony Brown; McEntire	4:01
17.	"Rumor Has It" (from Rumor Has It)	Bruce Burch; Vern Dant; Larry Shell	Brown; McEntire	3:47
Total length:				64:23

Disc two
No.	Title	Writer(s)	Producer(s)	Length
1.	"Love Needs a Holiday" (New recording)	Tim Mensy; Tony Haselden	McEntire; Cannon	3:14
2.	"For My Broken Heart" (from For My Broken Heart)	Liz Hengber; Keith Palmer	Brown; McEntire	4:20
3.	"Is There Life Out There" (from For My Broken Heart)	Susan Longacre; Rick Giles	Brown; McEntire	3:55
4.	"The Greatest Man I Never Knew" (from For My Broken Heart)	Richard Leigh; Layng Martine Jr.	Brown; McEntire	3:16
5.	"It's Your Call" (from It's Your Call)	Hengber; Shawna Harrington-Burkhart; Bruce Burch	Brown; McEntire	3:11
6.	"The Heart Won't Lie" (duet with Vince Gill, from It's Your Call)	Kim Carnes; Donna Terry Weiss	Brown; McEntire	3:23
7.	"Does He Love You" (duet with Linda Davis, from Greatest Hits Volume Two)	Sandy Knox; Billy Stritch	Brown; McEntire	4:21
8.	"Till You Love Me" (from Read My Mind)	Bob DiPiero; Gary Burr	Brown; McEntire	3:52
9.	"The Heart Is a Lonely Hunter" (from Read My Mind)	Mark D. Sanders; Kim Williams; Ed Hill	Brown	3:52
10.	"And Still" (from Read My Mind)	Hengber; Tommy Lee James	Brown; McEntire	3:30
11.	"Ring on Her Finger, Time on Her Hands" (from Starting Over)	Don Goodman; Pam Rose; Mary Ann Kennedy	Brown; McEntire	4:15
12.	"The Fear of Being Alone" (from What If It's You)	Walt Aldridge; Bruce Miller	McEntire; John Guess	3:04
13.	"How Was I to Know" (from What If It's You)	Cathy Majeski; Sunny Russ; Stephony Smith	Guess; McEntire	3:42
14.	"If You See Him/If You See Her" (duet with Brooks & Dunn, from If You See Him)	James; Terry McBride; Jennifer Kimball	Brown; Tim DuBois	3:59
15.	"Forever Love" (from If You See Him)	Hengber; Deanna Bryant; Russ	David Malloy; McEntire	3:54
16.	"What Do You Say" (from So Good Together)	Michael Dulaney; Neil Thrasher	Malloy; McEntire	3:32
17.	"I'm a Survivor" (from Greatest Hits Volume III: I'm a Survivor)	Shelby Kennedy; Phillip White	Brown; McEntire	3:09
18.	"Somebody" (from Room to Breathe)	Dave Berg; Sam Tate; Annie Tate	Cannon; McEntire; Norro Wilson	3:51
Total length:				66:20

== Personnel ==
The following musicians performed on "You're Gonna Be" and "Love Needs a Holiday":

- Bruce Bouton – steel guitar
- Spady Brannan – bass guitar
- Perry Coleman – background vocals on "Love Needs a Holiday"
- Eric Darken – percussion
- Kenny Greenberg – electric guitar
- Tommy Harden – drums
- Jim Kimball – acoustic guitar
- Reba McEntire – lead vocals
- Jerry McPherson – electric guitar
- Greg Morrow – extra drums on "Love Needs a Holiday"
- Jimmy Nichols – piano, background vocals
- Larry Paxton – extra bass guitar on "Love Needs a Holiday"
- Tammy Rogers – fiddle on "Love Needs a Holiday"
- Doug Sisemore – keyboards
- Jennifer Wrinkle – background vocals on "You're Gonna Be"

== Charts ==
=== Weekly charts ===
Chart (2005)	Peak position
Australian Albums (ARIA)	178
US Billboard 200	12
US Top Country Albums (Billboard)	3

=== Year-end charts ===
Chart (2006)	Position
US Billboard 200	78
US Top Country Albums (Billboard)	21
Chart (2007)	Position
US Top Country Albums (Billboard)	67

=== Singles ===
Year	Song	Chart positions
Year	Song	US Country
2005	"You're Gonna Be (Always Loved By Me)"	33
2006	"Love Needs a Holiday"	60
"—" denotes releases that did not chart.

=== Certifications and sales ===
Region	Certification	Certified units/sales
United States (RIAA)	2× Platinum	1,195,800
