= Moments and Memories: The Best of Reba =

Greatest hits album by Reba McEntire
- Released: March 18, 1998
- Genre: Country
- Label: MCA
- Producer: Various

Reba McEntire chronology
| What If It's You (1996) | Moments and Memories: The Best of Reba (1998) | If You See Him (1998) |

Professional ratings
Review scores
| Source | Rating |
|---|---|
| Allmusic | 4/5 stars |

Moments and Memories: The Best of Reba is a compilation album by Reba McEntire, released on March 18, 1998, in Australia; June 1, 1998, in Europe; and September 21, 1999, in Canada, by MCA Nashville. The album features a different track listing in each country. It has been certified gold in Australia and Canada

== Track listing ==
=== Australia ===
| No. | Title | Writer(s) | Length |
|---|---|---|---|
| 1. | "Whoever's in New England" | Kendal Franceschi, Quentin Powers | 3:23 |
| 2. | "Does He Love You" (duet with Linda Davis) | Sandy Knox, Billy Stritch | 4:19 |
| 3. | "You Lie" | Charlie Black, Bobby Fischer, Austin Roberts | 3:58 |
| 4. | "Fancy" | Bobbie Gentry | 4:57 |
| 5. | "For My Broken Heart" | Liz Hengber, Keith Palmer | 3:35 |
| 6. | "Is There Life Out There" | Rick Giles, Susan Longacre | 3:11 |
| 7. | "The Greatest Man I Never Knew" | Richard Leigh, Layng Martine Jr. | 3:15 |
| 8. | "Read My Mind" | Melissa Coleman, Todd Moore, Keith Thomas | 4:04 |
| 9. | "She Thinks His Name Was John" | Knox, Steve Rosen | 4:23 |
| 10. | "Why Haven't I Heard from You" | T. W. Hale, Knox | 3:28 |
| 11. | "On My Own"" (duet with Trisha Yearwood, Martina McBride, and Linda Davis) | Burt Bacharach / Carole Bayer Sager | 4:33 |
| 12. | "You Keep Me Hangin' On" | Lamont Dozier, Edward Holland, Jr., Brian Holland | 3:26 |
| 13. | "You're No Good" | Clint Ballard Jr. | 3:33 |
| 14. | "The Fear of Being Alone" | Walt Aldridge, Bruce Miller | 3:03 |
| 15. | "I'd Rather Ride Around with You" | Tim Nichols, Mark D. Sanders | 3:29 |
| 16. | "What If" | Diane Warren | 4:02 |
| 17. | "I'll Take Your Heart" (previously unreleased) | Robert John "Mutt" Lange | 4:35 |
| 18. | "And Still" (re-recording) | Liz Hengber, Tommy Lee James | 3:51 |
| 19. | "I'll Give You Something to Miss" | Rick Bowles, David Malloy | 3:38 |
| 20. | "Fallin' Out of Love" (re-recording) | Jon Ims | 5:33 |

=== Europe ===
| No. | Title | Writer(s) | Length |
|---|---|---|---|
| 1. | "Whoever's in New England" | Kendal Franceschi, Quentin Powers | 3:24 |
| 2. | "Little Rock" | Bob DiPiero, Gerry House, Pat McManus | 3:08 |
| 3. | "The Fear of Being Alone" | Walt Aldridge, Bruce Miller | 3:03 |
| 4. | "I'd Rather Ride Around with You" | Tim Nichols, Mark D. Sanders | 3:29 |
| 5. | "One Promise Too Late" | Dave Loggins, Don Schlitz, Lisa Silver | 3:28 |
| 6. | "Is There Life Out There" | Rick Giles, Susan Longacre | 3:53 |
| 7. | "For My Broken Heart" | Liz Hengber, Keith Palmer | 4:18 |
| 8. | "Walk On" | Steve Dean, Lonnie Williams | 3:15 |
| 9. | "The Greatest Man I Never Knew" | Richard Leigh, Layng Martine Jr. | 3:15 |
| 10. | "Why Haven't I Heard from You" | T. W. Hale, Sandy Knox | 3:29 |
| 11. | "And Still" | Liz Hengber, Tommy Lee James | 3:29 |
| 12. | "The Heart Is a Lonely Hunter" | Kim Williams, Lonnie Williams | 3:52 |
| 13. | "It's Your Call" | Bruce Burch, Shawna Harrington-Burkhart, Hengber | 3:10 |
| 14. | "She Thinks His Name Was John" | Knox, Steve Rosen | 4:24 |
| 15. | "The Heart Won't Lie" (duet with Vince Gill) | Kim Carnes, Donna Weiss | 3:22 |
| 16. | "Fancy" | Bobbie Gentry | 4:58 |
| 17. | "Rumor Has It" | Bruce Burch, Vern Dent, Larry Shell | 3:48 |
| 18. | "Does He Love You" (duet with Linda Davis) | Knox, Billy Stritch | 4:20 |
| 19. | "Till You Love Me" | Gary Burr, DiPiero | 3:52 |
| 20. | "Forever Love" | Deanna Bryant, Hengber, Sunny Russ | 3:52 |

=== Canada ===
| No. | Title | Writer(s) | Length |
|---|---|---|---|
| 1. | "Whoever's in New England" | Kendal Franceschi, Quentin Powers | 3:23 |
| 2. | "Little Rock" | Bob DiPiero, Gerry House, Pat McManus | 3:08 |
| 3. | "Somebody Should Leave" | Harlan Howard, Chick Rains | 3:33 |
| 4. | "What Am I Gonna Do About You" | Jim Allison, Doug Gilmore, Bob Simon | 3:30 |
| 5. | "One Promise Too Late" | Dave Loggins, Don Schlitz, Lisa Silver | 3:28 |
| 6. | "Is There Life Out There" | Rick Giles, Susan Longacre | 3:53 |
| 7. | "For My Broken Heart" | Liz Hengber, Keith Palmer | 4:18 |
| 8. | "Walk On" | Steve Dean, Lonnie Williams | 3:15 |
| 9. | "The Greatest Man I Never Knew" | Richard Leigh, Layng Martine Jr. | 3:15 |
| 10. | "Why Haven't I Heard from You" | T. W. Hale, Sandy Knox | 3:29 |
| 11. | "And Still" | Liz Hengber, Tommy Lee James | 3:29 |
| 12. | "The Heart Is a Lonely Hunter" | Kim Williams, Lonnie Williams | 3:52 |
| 13. | "It's Your Call" | Bruce Burch, Shawna Harrington-Burkhart, Hengber | 3:10 |
| 14. | "The Night the Lights Went Out in Georgia" | Bobby Russell | 4:17 |
| 15. | "The Heart Won't Lie" (duet with Vince Gill) | Kim Carnes, Donna Weiss | 3:22 |
| 16. | "Fancy" | Bobbie Gentry | 4:58 |
| 17. | "Rumor Has It" | Bruce Burch, Vern Dent, Larry Shell | 3:48 |
| 18. | "Does He Love You" (duet with Linda Davis) | Knox, Billy Stritch | 4:20 |
| 19. | "Misty Blue" (previously unreleased) | Bob Montgomery | 4:25 |
| 20. | "Sweet Dreams" (live recording) | Don Gibson | 4:06 |

== Charts ==
Album

| Chart (1998) | Peak position |
|---|---|
| Australian Albums (ARIA) | 14 |
| Australian Country Albums (ARIA) | 1 |
| Canadian Albums Chart | 35 |
| Canadian Top Country Albums | 3 |
| UK Albums (OCC) | 137 |

Singles

| Year | Single | Chart | Position |
|---|---|---|---|
| 1999 | "Does He Love You" | UK Singles Chart | 62 |

== Certifications ==
| Country | Certification (thresholds) | Sales |
|---|---|---|
| Australia | Gold | 78,000 |
| Canada | Gold | 91,000 |
