= Together in Vegas =

2015–21 concert residency by Reba McEntire and Brooks & Dunn

- Residency by Reba McEntire and Brooks & Dunn
- Promotional poster for the show
- Venue: The Colosseum at Caesars Palace
- Date(s): June 17, 2015 – December 15, 2021
- No. of shows: 45

Together in Vegas is a co-headlined concert residency with American country music recordings artists, Reba McEntire and Brooks & Dunn. The show marks the reunion of Brooks & Dunn since their breakup in 2010. It features the biggest hits by both artists, including their duets. The residency started in June 2015.

The shows in 2015 grossed over $9 million, ranking 104th on Pollstar's "Top 200 North American Tours".

== Background ==
The tour was announced during a Q&A session being McEntire, Brooks and Dunn, on December 3, 2014. Brooks & Dunn reunited after a suggestion from McEntire about the forthcoming Vegas show. The show marks the third time the trio have toured together. Brooks & Dunn served as the opening act on McEntire's "It's Your Call Tour". In 1997, they co-headlined a concert tour lasting until 1999. During an interview with Country Weekly, Kix Brooks stated planning had not started for the show (in February 2016), however McEntire was cracking the whip to get things done. In an interview with Billboard described the show as "collaborative" with both acts on stage together with a few solo numbers.

"It's going to be a good show. I know it is. I feel it in my bones. Everybody feels good about it. We love it, but that's not saying after we get under the lights and onto the huge stage we don't change a few things, but for now we're at a good place with it."

== Setlist ==
This setlist is obtained from the concert held on June 19, 2015. It does not represent all shows during the residency.

Brooks & Dunn/McEntire

1. "Play Something Country"
2. "Why Haven't I Heard from You"
3. "Little Miss Honky Tonk" / "Consider Me Gone" / "Mama Don't Get Dressed Up for Nothing" / "Little Rock" / "Put a Girl in It" / "Can't Even Get the Blues"

Brooks and Dunn

4. "Red Dirt Road"
5. "Brand New Man"
6. "Neon Moon"

McEntire

7. "The Night the Lights Went Out in Georgia"
8. "Going Out Like That"
9. "Whoever's in New England"

Brooks & Dunn

10. "Ain't Nothing 'bout You"
11. "Hillbilly Deluxe"
12. "Rock My World (Little Country Girl)"

Brooks & Dunn/McEntire

13. "Cowgirls Don't Cry"
14. "You're Gonna Miss Me When I'm Gone"
15. "If You See Him/If You See Her"

McEntire

16. "The Fear of Being Alone"
17. "You Lie" / "For My Broken Heart" / "And Still"
18. "Is There Life Out There"

Brooks and Dunn

19. "Believe"

McEntire

20. "Turn On the Radio"
21. "I'm a Survivor"

Brooks & Dunn

22. "Boot Scootin' Boogie"
23. "My Maria"

McEntire

24. "Fancy"

Brooks & Dunn/McEntire

25. "Only in America"

== Shows ==
Date	Tickets Sold / Available	Gross Revenue
Leg I
June 17, 2015	37,223 / 37,978 (98%)	$4,952,377
June 19, 2015	37,223 / 37,978 (98%)	$4,952,377
June 20, 2015	37,223 / 37,978 (98%)	$4,952,377
June 24, 2015	37,223 / 37,978 (98%)	$4,952,377
June 26, 2015	37,223 / 37,978 (98%)	$4,952,377
June 27, 2015	37,223 / 37,978 (98%)	$4,952,377
July 1, 2015	37,223 / 37,978 (98%)	$4,952,377
July 3, 2015	37,223 / 37,978 (98%)	$4,952,377
July 4, 2015	37,223 / 37,978 (98%)	$4,952,377
Leg II
December 1, 2015	37,446 / 38,115 (98%)	$4,977,905
December 2, 2015	37,446 / 38,115 (98%)	$4,977,905
December 4, 2015	37,446 / 38,115 (98%)	$4,977,905
December 6, 2015	37,446 / 38,115 (98%)	$4,977,905
December 7, 2015	37,446 / 38,115 (98%)	$4,977,905
December 8, 2015	37,446 / 38,115 (98%)	$4,977,905
December 9, 2015	37,446 / 38,115 (98%)	$4,977,905
December 11, 2015	37,446 / 38,115 (98%)	$4,977,905
December 12, 2015	37,446 / 38,115 (98%)	$4,977,905
Leg III
May 3, 2016	23,497 / 25,438 (92%)	$3,045,968
May 6, 2016	23,497 / 25,438 (92%)	$3,045,968
May 7, 2016	23,497 / 25,438 (92%)	$3,045,968
May 10, 2016	23,497 / 25,438 (92%)	$3,045,968
May 13, 2016	23,497 / 25,438 (92%)	$3,045,968
May 14, 2016	23,497 / 25,438 (92%)	$3,045,968
July 12, 2016	-	-
July 15, 2016	-	-
July 16, 2016	-	-
July 19, 2016	-	-
July 22, 2016	-	-
July 23, 2016	-	-
July 26, 2016	-	-
July 29, 2016	-	-
July 30, 2016	-	-
Leg IV
November 30, 2016	-	-
December 2, 2016	-	-
December 3, 2016	-	-
December 7, 2016	-	-
December 9, 2016	-	-
December 10, 2016	-	-
February 22, 2017	-	-
February 24, 2017	-	-
February 25, 2017	-	-
March 1, 2017	-	-
March 3, 2017	-	-
March 4, 2017	-	-
Leg V
June 21, 2017	-	-
June 24, 2017	-	-
June 25, 2017	-	-
June 28, 2017	-	-
July 1, 2017	-	-
July 2,2017	-	-
November 29, 2017	-	-
December 1, 2017	-	-
December 2, 2017	-	-
December 5, 2017	-	-
December 8, 2017	-	-
December 9, 2017	-	-
December 10, 2017	-	-
Leg VI
March 14, 2018	-	-
March 16, 2018	-	-
March 17, 2018	-	-
March 21, 2018	-	-
March 23, 2018	-	-
March 24, 2018	-	-
August 15, 2018		
August 17, 2018		
August 18, 2018		
August 22, 2018		
August 24, 2018		
August 25, 2018		
December 15, 2021		
TOTAL	98,166 / 101,531 (97%)	$12,976,250
