= Love Revival =

Compilation album by Reba McEntire
- Released: January 2, 2008
- Genre: Country
- Length: 38:21
- Label: Hallmark/MCA
- Producers: Reba McEntire; Tony Brown; Jimmy Bowen; Norro Wilson

Reba McEntire chronology
Reba: Duets (2007)	Love Revival (2008)	50 Greatest Hits (2008)

Love Revival is a compilation album by American country singer Reba McEntire. The album was released on January 2, 2008 exclusively at Hallmark gift and card stores in the United States.

On February 11, 2008, the album was certified gold by the RIAA. The album consists of six previously released songs and four new recordings. One of the new recordings, "I'll Still Be Loving You", is a cover of a song originally recorded by the band Restless Heart, for whom it was a Number One country hit in 1987. McEntire's version features backing vocals from Restless Heart.

== Track listing ==
No.	Title	Writer(s)	Length
1.	"Love Revival"	Leslie Satcher, Marc Harris	4:08
2.	"You Must Really Love Me"	Reba McEntire, Don Schlitz	3:05
3.	"Bad for My Own Good" (previously unreleased)	Joe H. Hunter, Jim Whitehead, Jim Weatherly	3:40
4.	"The Heart Won't Lie" (With Vince Gill)	Kim Carnes, Donna Terry Weiss	3:22
5.	"Love Needs a Holiday"	Tim Mensy, Tony Haselden	3:15
6.	"With You I Am" (previously unreleased)	Steve Diamond	3:46
7.	"Somebody"	Dave Berg, Sam Tate, Annie Tate	3:52
8.	"Forever Love"	Liz Hengber, Deanna Bryant, Sunny Russ	3:53
9.	"Big Blue Sky" (previously unreleased)	Steve Azar, Rafe Van Hoy	4:23
10.	"I'll Still Be Loving You" (previously unreleased)	Todd Cerney, Pat Bunch, Mary Ann Kennedy, Pam Rose	4:57

=== Certifications ===
Region	Certification	Certified units/sales
United States (RIAA)	Gold	500,000^{^}
^{^} Shipments figures based on certification alone.
