= Never Let Your Deal Go Down =

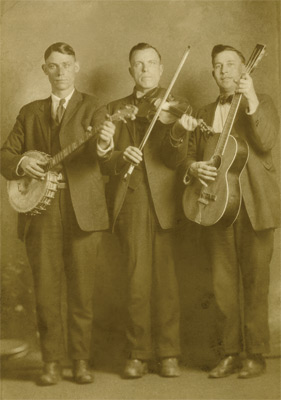
Charlie Poole and the North Carolina Ramblers

"Never Let Your Deal Go Down" is an American folk song of the early 20th century or earlier.

It appears under various variant titles such as "Never Let the Deal Go Down", "Don't Let the Deal Go Down", "The Deal, Deal Rag", and others. The deal going down refers to gambling with cards. The song has a four-chord progression (VI—II—V—I) that repeats twice in the verse and twice in the chorus. The lyrics, when not obscure, tell of an itinerant life including gambling.

The first known recording of the song was by Charlie Poole with the North Carolina Ramblers (as "Don't Let Your Deal Go Down Blues") in 1926. The record was very successful; according to Charles Wolfe, it sold over 100,000 copies. According to Kinney Rorrer in Rambling Blues -- The Life and Songs of Charlie Poole, Poole was taught the lyrics by another North Carolina musician who had learned them from a local Black guitarist in 1911 (Poole already knew the tune). As is common with folk songs, much borrowing between songs, and variations of lyrics, are found. Some lyrics of "Never Let Your Deal Go Down", e.g. "Who's gonna shoe your pretty white feet; Who's gonna glove your hand?... She said 'Papa will shoe my pretty little feet, Mama will glove my hand'" hark back to the 19th century (or earlier) song "The Lass of Roch Royal" (Roud 49, Child 76): "O wha [who] will shoe my bony foot? Or wha will glove my hand?... Thy father will shoe thy bony feet, thy mother will glove thy hand."

The song has since been recorded by Doc Watson, Flatt & Scruggs, the New Lost City Ramblers, David Bromberg, the Flying Burrito Brothers, and Bob Wills (as an instrumental), as well as Zora Neale Hurston (at the Federal Music Project office in Jacksonville, Florida, on June 18, 1939), John Jackson, Dave Alvin and the Guilty Men, Preston Fulp, Billy Strings, Etta Baker (instrumental), Sierra Ferrell, The Chieftains, and others.

"Deal" by Garcia/Hunter (on Garcia) is also about gambling and has several similarities to "Don't Let Your Deal Go Down", and repeats several times the line "Wait until that deal come round, don't you let that deal go down", echoing to a degree the chorus of "Never Let Your Deal Go Down" ("Don't let your deal go down / Don't let your deal go down /Don't let your deal go down, sweet mama / Till your last gold dollar's gone"). Other songs use the "deal" motif in title ("Waitin' for the Deal to Go Down", "When the Deal Goes Down", "Last Fair Deal Gone Down", "Another Deal Goes Down" (Stevie Winwood), "Deal Goin' Down" (ZZ Top), without necessarily being related to "Never Let Your Deal Go Down".
