= Reba: Duets =

Studio album by Reba McEntire
- Released: September 18, 2007
- Recorded: 2006–07
- Studios: Starstruck Studios, Blackbird Studio, The Cyber Ranch, Masterfonics, Sound Stage Studios and The Sound Station (Nashville, Tennessee); The Sound Kitchen (Franklin, Tennessee); Record Plant (Los Angeles, California); Capitol Studios and Henson Recording Studios (Hollywood, California); Oz Recording Studios (Valencia, California); The Panhandle House (Denton, Texas)
- Genres: Country; country pop; country rock
- Length: 44:19
- Label: MCA Nashville
- Producers: Tony Brown; Dann Huff; Reba McEntire; Justin Timberlake

Reba McEntire chronology
20th Century Masters – The Millennium Collection: The Best of Reba McEntire (2007)	Reba: Duets (2007)	Love Revival (2008)

Singles from Reba: Duets
- 1. "Because of You" Released: May 15, 2007; 2. "The Only Promise That Remains" Released: November 5, 2007; 3. "Every Other Weekend" Released: March 3, 2008

Reba: Duets is the twenty-sixth studio album by American country music singer Reba McEntire. It was released on September 18, 2007, by MCA Nashville and was produced by Tony Brown, Dann Huff, McEntire, and Justin Timberlake.

Reba: Duets was McEntire's second album to appear in the new millennium decade and one of her most successful crossover albums, as it is her first studio album to chart in Australia and her 3rd to chart in the UK. It was her first album to reach #1 on the Billboard 200, while also reaching #1 on the Top Country Albums chart, and was also her final release for the MCA Nashville label. The album featured collaborations from eleven different artists in the genres of country, pop, and rock.

The album debuted at #1 on the Billboard Top Country Albums chart and the Billboard Top 200 Albums chart with sales of 300,000.

== Background ==
Reba: Duets was recorded at Starstruck Studios in Nashville, Tennessee. Allmusic reviewer, Thom Jurek considered that the quality of the album's tracks was different from that of most other collaboration projects, calling it a "mixed bag" of material. The first collaborator on the album was LeAnn Rimes, who recorded the track, "When You Love Someone Like That" which also appeared on LeAnn Rimes's Family album that same year. Jurek called the duet between the pair "stellar," while about.com called the pairing "an undeniable outcome of perfection. Reba's strong country voice with LeAnn's young, soulful sound created a new sound like no other."

The second track, "Does That Wind Still Blow In Oklahoma" was a collaboration with Ronnie Dunn (half of the duo Brooks & Dunn), who co-wrote the song with McEntire. The third track is a duet with Kelly Clarkson on one of her previous major pop hits, "Because of You." The song was the album's lead single and had already peaked at #2 on the Hot Country Songs chart at the time of the album's release. The song was criticized by allmusic, saying that, "the song is simply a big, overblown power ballad with guitars compressed to the breaking point, sweeping strings, and enormous crashing cymbals -- think Jim Steinman and you get it." The same idea was also said about the fourth track, "Faith In Love" with Rascal Flatts. The fifth track was performed with country artist, Trisha Yearwood on the song, "She Can't Save Him", which was formerly released as a single by Canadian country artist, Lisa Brokop. Tracks six and seven were collaborations with American pop artist, Carole King and country artist, Kenny Chesney, who both help in providing musical variations towards the album. Country Standard Time called track nine (a collaboration with Faith Hill called "Sleeping with the Telephone") "tearful emotion."

=== The Only Promise That Remains ===
The tenth track was a country duet with Justin Timberlake on the song, called "The Only Promise That Remains", co-written by Timberlake himself, with additional writing from Matt Morris. The song lasts for five minutes and six seconds. It is an acoustic-based Celtic love song whose instrumentation consists of strings, cello fills, the dobro and an upright bass. The album closes with "Break Each Other's Hearts Again", a duet with Don Henley.

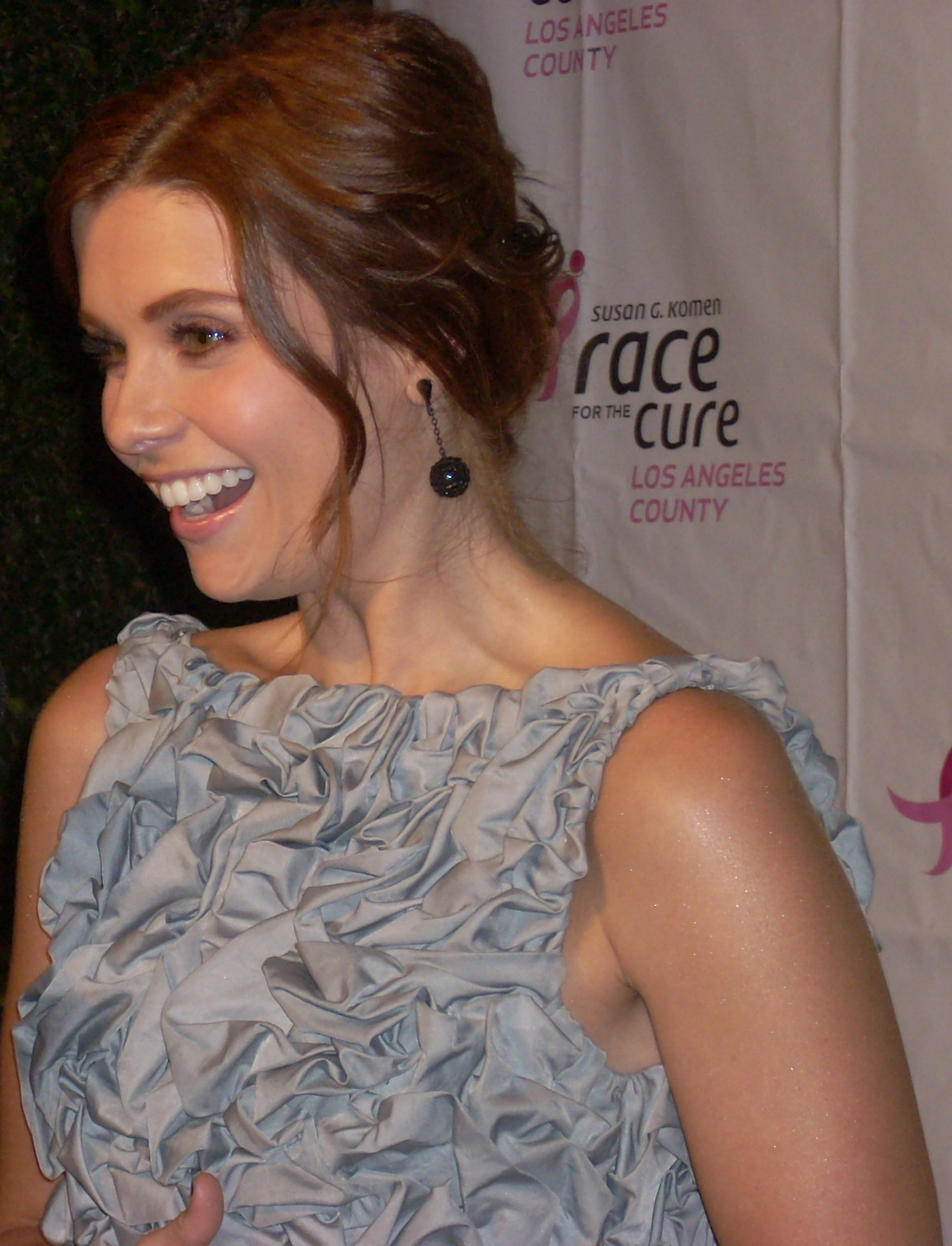
McEntire came into contact with Timberlake through Joanna García.

McEntire came into contact with Justin Timberlake through Joanna García, who portrayed McEntire's daughter on the sitcom Reba and was dating Timberlake's friend Trace Ayala. Timberlake and McEntire met for the first time at the 49th Annual Grammy Awards ceremony on February 11, 2007. She asked him to be a part of the project, to which he replied: "Okay, great, I'll write something. Is that okay?". McEntire was skeptical at first, unsure of "what he was going to bring back to [her]". According to McEntire, she didn't know if the song was going to be "SexyBack 2, 3 or 4". She revealed: "I was really nervous. I didn't know how I was going to say no to a song I didn't like if Justin had written it."

On February 12, Timberlake and Matt Morris wrote the song for McEntire. When she heard the song, she was relieved, as she was expecting the song to be "something that was wayyy out of [her] ballpark". Timberlake produced the song, while Morris provided background vocals. McEntire's vocals were recorded by Chris Ashburn and Kevin Mills at Starstruck Studios in Nashville, while Timberlake's were recorded by Jeff Rothschild at Henson Recording Studios in Hollywood. Larry Gold arranged and conducted the strings, which were provided by Alyssa Park, Amy Wickman, Caroline Buckman and the Section Quartet. Rob Ickes performed the dobro, while Glenn Worf performed the upright bass. The song was mixed by Jean-Marie Horvat, with assistance from Colin Miller at Oz Recording Studios in Valencia.

Recalling the events, McEntire revealed that the collaboration "worked out really great". Of Timberlake, she said: "He's a sweetheart, a very good old country boy from Memphis, Tenn., and he's a huge fan of country music so it worked out wonderfully well". Timberlake dedicated the song to his grandfather, an avid country music fan. Timberlake announced their collaboration in May 2007, revealing that he was "making [his] grandfather very proud by working with someone like Reba McEntire".

== Critical reception ==
Professional ratings
Review scores
Source	Rating
Allmusic	3.5/5 stars
About	4.5/5 stars
PopMatters.com	7/10 stars

Reba: Duets gained fairly positive reviews from most music critics. Allmusic's Thom Jurek stated that although he considered it not to be a "perfect record", he did find the album to "deliver". Jurek concluded by saying, "It's sincere, it's polished, and it's full of good to great songs delivered in mostly interesting ways." In his review, he gave the album three and a half out of five stars.

Reviewing the album, Rick Bell of Country Standard Time gave praise to McEntire and her production on the release, saying, "Give credit to McEntire for corralling the egos - including her own - and producing an album with depth, passion and a bunch of great voices." About.com's Scott Sexton gave Reba: Duets four and a half out of five stars, overall stating, "Reba McEntire has proven she can stand the test of time, and with some help from close friends she sounds better than ever." Reviewing Reba: Duets in 2007, Lana Cooper of PopMatters acclaimed McEntire's vocal strength in the album by saying, "Reba's voice manages to sound sweet without being syrupy, while being extremely powerful. McEntire's vocal strength yields a different kind of authority than the bluesy, drawling growl of Janis Joplin, the weathered rasp of Marianne Faithfull, or even the soul-shrieking powerhouse of Tina Turner. Instead, Reba's voice combines the aspects of all three singers but tempers it with a Southern sweetness and an unmistakable femininity." Cooper overall stated, "Reba Duets is largely a strong showing."

=== The Only Promise That Remains ===
"The Only Promise That Remains" received lukewarm reviews from contemporary music critics, who deemed it a surprising collaboration. Some critics, however, noted that "The Only Promise That Remains" was not as strong as others tracks on Reba: Duets. The song was serviced to country radio in the United States by MCA Nashville on November 5, 2007, as the second single from Reba: Duets. The single failed to chart on the US Hot Country Songs chart, but peaked at 72 on the US Pop 100 chart and at number five on the US Bubbling Under Hot 100 Singles chart. McEntire and Timberlake performed the song live on The Oprah Winfrey Show on September 19, 2007.

Randy Vest of People described the song as "a gentle, strikingly simple duet". Timberlake's harmonies performed throughout the song were praised by Allmusic's Thom Jurek, who wrote that "it's a welcome surprise" which is "more about serving the song than about not being able to sing".

According to Jurek, the song is "maybe a tad longer" than it should be, although he specified that it was a small complaint. Lana Cooper of PopMatters questioned the strength of the song, and Billboard's KT agreed, calling the song the most "unexpected cut" on the album and that "one could picture the pair singing it at a writer's night somewhere". Cooper wrote that in Timberlake's "unexpected surprise cameo" he "fades into a secondary role", as opposed to the other artists on Reba: Duets that "make a strong showing" next to McEntire. She wrote that Timberlake "sounds pretty enough" and that he does "contribute a certain mood" to the song, however, commented that "anyone expecting more of a collaborative effort out of him would be sorely disappointed".

== Release and aftermath ==
Reba: Duets was originally planned to be released in April 2007, however the date was pushed to September 18 instead. The lead single, "Because of You" was released to radio May 15 and reached a peak of #2 on the Hot Country Songs chart and #50 on the Billboard Hot 100 in August, shortly before the album's release date. A week after the album's release, it became the United States' best-selling album of the week, debuting at number one on both the Top Country Albums and Billboard 200 albums charts, selling a total of 300,536 copies in its first week, according to Nielsen SoundScan. It debuted at number 4 on the Canadian Album Charts. Reba Duets was certified platinum by the Recording Industry Association of America in October 2007, becoming her twentieth platinum album. The album's second single, "The Only Promise That Remains" (with Justin Timberlake) was released in November 2007, but only reached #72 on the Billboard Pop 100 and did not chart the Hot Country Songs list. The third single, "Every Other Weekend" (with Kenny Chesney) was released in 2008. However, the official single featured Skip Ewing as the duet partner instead of Chesney, due to the Chesney version not being "viable" for radio (due to radio company issues). It charted outside the main UK top 100 album chart but has sold over 15,000 copies in the UK. McEntire and LeAnn Rimes performed their duet of "When You Love Someone Like That" at the 41st CMA Music Awards.

== Track listing ==
No.	Title	Writer(s)	Producer(s)	Length
1.	"When You Love Someone Like That" (with LeAnn Rimes)	Ed Hill; Karyn Rochelle	Reba McEntire; Tony Brown	4:39
2.	"Does the Wind Still Blow in Oklahoma" (with Ronnie Dunn)	McEntire; Dunn	McEntire; Brown	4:37
3.	"Because of You" (with Kelly Clarkson)	Clarkson; Ben Moody; David Hodges	McEntire; Brown	3:43
4.	"Faith in Love" (with Rascal Flatts)	Jay DeMarcus; Joe Don Rooney; Gary LeVox	McEntire; Brown	3:47
5.	"She Can't Save Him" (with Trisha Yearwood)	Liz Hengber; Bob Regan	McEntire; Brown	3:02
6.	"Everyday People" (with Carole King)	Lorrie Harden; Tom Harden; Don Rollins	McEntire; Brown	3:34
7.	"Every Other Weekend" (with Kenny Chesney)	Connie Harrington; Skip Ewing	McEntire; Brown	4:03
8.	"These Broken Hearts" (with Vince Gill)	Gill; Pete Wasner	McEntire; Brown	4:25
9.	"Sleeping with the Telephone" (with Faith Hill)	Lorrie Harden; Tom Harden; Rollins	McEntire; Brown; Dann Huff	3:33
10.	"The Only Promise That Remains" (with Justin Timberlake)	Timberlake; Matt Morris	Timberlake	5:06
11.	"Break Each Other's Hearts Again" (with Don Henley)	John Wiggins; Jon Randall	McEntire; Brown	3:38

Target Exclusive Bonus DVD
No.	Title	Length
1.	"Outtakes from Reba"
2.	"Interviews from the set of Reba"

== Personnel ==
Vocals

- Reba McEntire – lead vocals
- LeAnn Rimes – lead vocals (1)
- Ronnie Dunn – lead vocals (2)
- Curtis Wright – backing vocals (2)
- Jenifer Wrinkle – backing vocals (2)
- Kelly Clarkson – lead vocals (3)
- Gary LeVox – lead vocals (4)
- Jay DeMarcus – backing vocals (4)
- Joe Don Rooney — backing vocals (4)
- Trisha Yearwood – lead vocals (5)
- Carole King – lead vocals (6)
- Kenny Chesney – lead vocals (7)
- Vince Gill – lead vocals (8)
- Ashley Cleveland – backing vocals (8)
- Kim Keyes – backing vocals (8)
- Judson Spence – backing vocals (8)
- Faith Hill – lead vocals (9)
- Justin Timberlake – lead vocals (10)
- Matt Morris – backing vocals (10)
- Don Henley – lead vocals (11)

Musicians

- Matt Rollings – Hammond B3 organ (1), acoustic piano (1, 6, 11)
- John Barlow Jarvis – acoustic piano (2–5, 9)
- Steve Nathan – Hammond B3 organ (2, 7, 8)
- Jimmy Nichols – synthesizer (3–5, 8), acoustic piano (7), Hammond B3 organ (9)
- Pete Wasner – acoustic piano (8)
- Tom Bukovac – electric guitar (1–10), acoustic guitar (10, 11)
- Michael Thompson – acoustic guitar (1), electric guitar (1)
- Ilya Toshinsky – acoustic guitar (2–5, 7–10)
- Dean Parks – acoustic guitar (6), electric guitar (11)
- JayDee Maness – steel guitar (1, 6, 11)
- Paul Franklin – steel guitar (2–5, 7–9)
- Rob Ickes – dobro (10)
- Leland Sklar – bass (1, 6, 11)
- Jimmie Lee Sloas – bass (2, 7–9)
- Glenn Worf – bass (3, 5), upright bass (10)
- Jay DeMarcus – bass (4)
- Russ Kunkel – drums (1, 6, 11)
- Greg Morrow – drums (2, 7–9)
- Paul Leim – drums (3, 5)
- Chris McHugh – drums (4)
- Aubrey Haynie – fiddle (2, 7, 10), mandolin (3–5, 8–10)
- The Nashville String Machine – strings (3, 7)
- Bergen White – string arrangements and conductor (3, 7)
- Carl Gorodetzky – string contractor (3, 7)
- The Section Quartet – strings (10)
- Caroline Buckman – strings (10)
- Alyssa Park – strings (10)
- Amy Wickman – strings (10)
- Larry Gold – string arrangements and conductor (10)

Technical credits

- Adam Ayan – mastering at Gateway Mastering (Portland, Maine)
- Tony Castle – digital editing
- Richard Davis – digital editing
- Brian David Willis – digital editing
- Mike Butler – recording (1)
- Steve Marcantonio – mixing (1, 6)
- Chuck Ainlay – recording (3–5, 10), mixing (3, 4, 9)
- John Kelton – mixing (5)
- Al Schmitt – recording (6, 11)
- Jean-Marie Horvat – mixing (10)
- Derek Bason – additional recording (1, 10), recording (2, 7–9), mixing (2, 7, 8)
- Jeff Kersey – additional recording (2)
- Kyle Lehning – additional recording (3, 7, 11), mixing (11)
- Ben Fowler – additional recording (4–6, 9, 11)
- Jeff Balding – additional recording (5, 6, 11)
- Mark Hagen – additional recording (9)
- Jeff Rothschild – additional recording (10)
- Nate Hertweck – recording assistant (1)
- Todd Tidwell – additional recording assistant (1, 2), recording assistant (2, 7–9)
- J.C. Monterrosa – mix assistant (1, 6)
- Chris Ashburn – mix assistant (2, 7, 8), recording assistant (8), additional recording assistant (10)
- Aaron Kasdoff – recording assistant (3–5, 10, 11), additional recording assistant (5, 6, 11)
- Casey Wood – additional recording assistant (3, 7, 11)
- Jim Cooley – mix assistant (3, 4, 9)
- David Bryant – additional recording assistant (4–6, 9, 11)
- Matt Rovey – mix assistant (5)
- Steve Genewick – recording assistant (6, 11)
- Seth Morton – additional recording assistant (9)
- Kevin Mills – additional recording assistant (10)
- Kazuri Arai – mix assistant (11)
- Chris Bell – additional engineer (11)

Production and Imagery

- Amy Garges – production assistant
- Craig Allen – art direction, design
- Marc Baptiste – photography
- Terry Gordon – stylist, wardrobe
- Brett Freedman – make-up, hairstylist
- Narvel Blackstock for Starstruck Entertainment – management

== Charts ==
=== Weekly charts ===
Chart (2007)	Peak position
Australian Albums (ARIA)	86
Canadian Albums Chart	4
Japanese Albums (Oricon)	118
US Billboard 200	1
US Billboard Digital Album Charts	1
US Billboard Top Country Albums	1

=== Year-end charts ===
Chart (2007)	Rank
Australian Country Albums (ARIA)	45
US Billboard 200	59
US Top Country Albums	11
Top 50 Global Best Selling Albums	44

=== Singles ===
Year	Song	Peak chart positions			
Year	Song	US Country	US	US Pop	CAN
2007	"Because of You"	2	50	56	36
2007	"The Only Promise That Remains"	—	105	72	—
2008	"Every Other Weekend"	15	104	—	—
"—" denotes releases that did not chart.

== Certifications ==
Region	Certification	Certified units/sales
United States (RIAA)	Platinum	1,000,000^{^}
^{^} Shipments figures based on certification alone.
