= Now You Tell Me =

Now You Tell Me may refer to:

- "Now You Tell Me", a 1990 song by Reba McEntire from Rumor Has It
- "Now You Tell Me", a 2007 song by Jordin Sparks from her self-titled album
