= Waitin' for the Deal to Go Down =

Single by Dixiana

from the album Dixiana
- B-side: "It Comes and It Goes"
- Released: February 22, 1992
- Genre: Country
- Length: 3:17
- Label: Epic
- Songwriter(s): Bobby Fischer, Charlie Black, Austin Roberts
- Producer(s): Bob Montgomery

Dixiana singles chronology
"Waitin' for the Deal to Go Down" (1992)	"That's What I'm Working On Tonight" (1992)

"Waitin' for the Deal to Go Down" is a song written by Charlie Black, Bobby Fischer, and Austin Roberts. It was first recorded by Reba McEntire on her 1990 album Rumor Has It.

It was later the debut single for American country music group Dixiana. It was released in February 1992 as the first single from the album Dixiana. The song reached #39 on the Billboard Hot Country Singles & Tracks chart.

== Chart performance ==
Chart (1992)	Peak position
US Hot Country Songs (Billboard)	39
Canadian RPM Country Tracks	27
