= Every Other Weekend =

Single by Reba McEntire with Kenny Chesney

from the album Reba: Duets
- Released: March 3, 2008
- Recorded: 2007
- Genre: Country
- Length: 4:04
- Label: MCA Nashville
- Songwriters: Skip Ewing and Connie Harrington
- Producers: Reba McEntire and Tony Brown

Reba McEntire singles chronology
| "The Only Promise That Remains" (2007) | "Every Other Weekend" (2008) | "Cowgirls Don't Cry" (2008) |

Kenny Chesney singles chronology
| "Shiftwork" (2007) | "Every Other Weekend" (2008) | "Better as a Memory" (2008) |

Music video
- "Every Other Weekend (Official Music Video)" on YouTube

"Every Other Weekend" is a duet by American country music artists Reba McEntire and Kenny Chesney, recorded on the former's 2007 album Reba: Duets. The song, written by Skip Ewing and Connie Harrington, is the third and final single from the album. When shipped to radio, Chesney's vocals were replaced with Ewing's, although for most of its chart run the song was not credited to either duet partner. It peaked at number 15 on the Billboard country singles charts in 2008, and number 4 on the Bubbling Under Hot 100.

== Content ==
"Every Other Weekend" is a ballad backed by piano and a string section. It alternates between the male and female duet partners, who take the roles of a divorced couple that share custody of their children and exchange them "every other weekend". Despite the fact that they are divorced, both characters state that they still love each other but are unable to tell each other in front of their children.

== Recording history ==
McEntire recorded the song as a duet with Kenny Chesney on her 2007 album Reba Duets. The song first charted in late 2007-early 2008, credited to both McEntire and Chesney, based on unsolicited airplay. Upon its official release as a single, it was re-recorded with Skip Ewing's vocals replacing Chesney's. The song was credited to "Reba McEntire with Skip Ewing or Kenny Chesney" for one week, and then credited to just McEntire for all subsequent weeks. Airplay for both versions was counted when the charts were tabulated.

== Critical reception ==
Jim Malec, reviewing the Skip Ewing version for The 9513, gave it a thumbs-up rating. He considered Ewing a more traditionally country voice, and thought that Ewing was more effective than Chesney at conveying the emotions. Kevin J. Coyne of Country Universe, gave an A rating to the album version, and a B to the Skip Ewing re-recording. He said that Chesney "steps up his game" while Ewing "pales in comparison".

== Music video ==
The music video was filmed in early June 2008, in Los Angeles, California. The video was directed by Roman White and features Joanna García and Steve Howey, both of whom starred in McEntire's sitcom Reba as Cheyenne and Van, respectively. Kenny Chesney does not appear in the video, although his recording is used. The video premiered on CMT on July 8, 2008.

== Chart performance ==
| Chart (2008) | Peak position |
|---|---|
| US Hot Country Songs (Billboard) | 15 |
| US Bubbling Under Hot 100 (Billboard) | 4 |
