= Preston Fulp =

Preston Fulp (1915–1993) was an African-American musician from North Carolina. Fulp sang and played guitar, as well as banjo and fiddle, in both the country blues and hillbilly (nascent country) styles. Tim Duffy, founder of the Music Maker Foundation, described him as "the last original piedmont blues [musician] from turn-of-the century Winston-Salem".

Fulp, the son of a tobacco sharecropper, was born on November 1, 1915, in Walnut Cove, North Carolina, a town near Winston-Salem in the North Carolina Piedmont. He learned to play guitar from the age of six, and went on to play on Saturday nights at barn dances, corn shuckings, and other community gatherings, and at tobacco auctions in Winston-Salem. He often played at the dance hall in Mount Airy, where he would play blues for the African-American audience, then move to the other side of the segregated hall and play hillbilly music for the whites.

As his day job, Fulp worked in a sawmill. During the Great Depression, Fulp hoboed around the country for about five years, doing itinerant farmwork and making moonshine. He then returned to Walnut Cove for good, where he went back to sawmill work and farmed tobacco, and married Janie Fulp.

Fulp recorded his only album in old age, making the album Sawmill Worker at age 78. He died a few months later, on October 16, 1993.

== Discography ==
=== Albums ===
- Sawmill Worker (2011, Music Maker Foundation – MMCD20)

=== Compilations ===
- "Careless Love" on A Living Past (1994, Music Maker Foundation – MMCD9401) and on Night On The Delta (1999, Sony Music Special Products – A31676) and on Expressin' The Blues: Reconstructed History Of The Blues (1999, Cello Recordings – MMKCD701)
- "Farther Along" also on A Living Past
- "Banks Of The Ohio" on Songs From The Roots Of America II (2002, Music Maker Foundation – MMCD28)
- "In The Pines" on Song Keepers : A Music Maker Foundation Anthology (2024, No Depression / Music Maker Foundation)
- "Never Let The Deal Go Down" (with Wheeler Bailey) on The Kirkland Recordings - Newly Discovered Field Recordings From Tennessee and North Carolina 1937–1939 (1984, Tennessee Folklore Society – TFS-106) and on Field Recordings - Volume 9: Georgia, South Carolina, North Carolina, Virginia & Kentucky (1924–1939) (1998, Document Records (UK) – DOCD-5599)
- "I Shall Not Be Moved" on Dixiefrog presents Music Maker Relief Foundation (The Last & Lost Blues Survivors) (2005, Dixiefrog (France) – DFG CD 8597)
