= Reba Nell McEntire =

Compilation album by Reba McEntire
- Released: February 10, 1986
- Recorded: March 1980–March 1983
- Genre: Country
- Length: 31:16
- Label: Mercury
- Producer: Jerry Kennedy

Reba McEntire chronology
Have I Got a Deal for You (1985)	Reba Nell McEntire (1986)	Whoever's in New England (1986)

Professional ratings
Review scores
Source	Rating
Allmusic	3/5 stars

Reba Nell McEntire is a compilation album by American country music singer Reba McEntire. It was released on February 10, 1986, by Mercury Records. The album consists of songs recorded during McEntire's tenure at Mercury Records that had been unreleased until years after her departure from the label. Mercury Records released the album on the same day that MCA Records released McEntire's tenth studio album, Whoever's in New England.

== Track listing ==
No.	Title	Writer(s)	Length
1.	"I've Never Stopped Dreaming of You"	J. L. Wallace; Terry Skinner; Lonnie Ledford	4:00
2.	"Hold On"	Mark Mueller	2:35
3.	"I Know I'll Have a Better Day Tomorrow"	Reba McEntire	2:16
4.	"Don't Say Goodnight, Say Good Morning"	Wanda Mallette; Patti Ryan	3:38
5.	"Muddy Mississippi"	Julie Jones; Johnny Bernard	3:26
6.	"It's Another Silent Night"	Skinner; Ken Bell	3:50
7.	"Empty Arms"	Ivory Joe Hunter	3:09
8.	"Love Is Never Easy"	Johnny MacRae; Bob Morrison	3:35
9.	"Waitin' for the Sun to Shine"	Sonny Throckmorton	2:46
10.	"Good Friends"	Len Chiriacka; Chris Gantry	2:17

== Personnel ==
Adapted from the album liner notes.

- Bill Brunt - album design
- Dennis Carney - photography
- Jerry Kennedy - producer
- Reba McEntire - lead vocals
- Bergen White - string arrangements
- Hank Williams - mastering

== Chart performance ==
Chart (1986)	Peak position
U.S. Billboard Top Country Albums	40
