= You're Gonna Be (Always Loved by Me) =

Single by Reba McEntire

from the album Reba #1's
- Released: August 29, 2005
- Genre: Country
- Length: 3:47
- Label: MCA Nashville
- Songwriters: Dennis Matkosky; Danny Orton
- Producers: Buddy Cannon; Reba McEntire

Reba McEntire singles chronology
"My Sister" (2005)	"You're Gonna Be (Always Loved by Me)" (2005)	"Love Needs a Holiday" (2006)

"You're Gonna Be (Always Loved by Me)" is a song written by Danny Orton and Dennis Matkosky, and recorded by American country music artist Reba McEntire. It was released on August 29, 2005 as the first single from Reba's compilation album Reba #1's.

== Background and content ==
In the early 2000's, McEntire took a hiatus from recording new material after gaining an acting role in the television series Reba. In 2004, she returned with the album Room to Breathe, which was commercially-successful. She followed this with several more releases for MCA Nashville during this period. "You're Gonna Be (Always Loved by Me)" was co-written by Dennis Matkosky and Danny Orton. Country Thang Daily described the track as "about a first-time mom and her 6 lbs and 9 oz. baby who looked up to her like she has all the answers in the world." Dan MacIntosh of Country Standard Time described the tune as "a song saturated with mother-to-child devotion." The song was produced by Buddy Cannon and Reba McEntire. The track was recorded in 2005. It was one of two songs included on her 2005 two-disc compilation titled Reba #1's.

== Release and chart performance ==
"You're Gonna Be" was released as a single on MCA Nashville Records on August 29, 2005. It was originally issued as a compact disc single to radio prior to the release of her compilation. According to a September issue of Billboard magazine, the song had peaked at number 47 in its third week on the American country survey. In November 2005, the single eventually peaked at number 33 on the Billboard Hot Country Songs chart, spending a total of 14 weeks charting. It was McEntire's lowest-peaking single since 2002's "Sweet Music Man". Reba 1's was later released in November 2005 and "You're Gonna Be" was the album's opening track.

== Music video ==
A music video directed by Peter Zavadil was released for the song. It starts with Reba's pregnant daughter in the hospital about to have her baby. She and her boyfriend hook up at a party and winds up pregnant. Her boyfriend leaves her and she can't bring herself to tell her mom so she becomes homeless. Later at the hospital, she has her baby and Reba shows up, having gotten her note that she tried to write, and she embraces her daughter and her newborn grandchild. The scenes are intercut with Reba singing in the hospital.

== Track listing ==
CD single

- "You're Gonna Be" – 3:47

== Charts ==
Chart performance for "You're Gonna Be"
Chart (2005)	Peak position
US Hot Country Songs (Billboard)	33
