= Is There Life Out There? =

- Genre: Drama
- Written by: Dalene Young
- Directed by: David Jones
- Starring: Reba McEntire; Keith Carradine; Genia Michaela; Mitchell Anderson; Donald Moffat
- Composer: J. A. C. Redford
- Country of origin: United States
- Original language: English

Production
- Executive producers: Narvel Blackstock; Reba McEntire
- Producer: Anne Hopkins
- Production location: Nashville
- Cinematography: Andrew Dunn
- Editor: Pamela Malouf-Cundy
- Running time: 89 minutes
- Production companies: Marian Rees Associates; Procter & Gamble Productions; Starstruck Entertainment

Original release
- Network: CBS
- Release: October 9, 1994

Is There Life Out There? is a 1994 American television film starring Reba McEntire and Keith Carradine. It is based on McEntire's 1992 song of the same name.

== Plot ==
Lily Marshall is unsatisfied with being a housewife and decides to go back to college to finish her degree. Lily struggles to balance her college work and social life with the expectations of her family, who are used to her being home with them.

== Cast ==
- Reba McEntire as Lily Marshall
- Keith Carradine as Brad Marshall
- Genia Michaela as Belle
- Mitchell Anderson as Joshua
- Kyle Hudgens as Malcolm Marshall
- Blair Struble as Cora Lee Marshall
- Donald Moffat as Grandpa Walter

== Production ==
As the music video for Is There Life Out There was essentially a short film, McEntire was approached by CBS about expanding it into a movie. As the song had already inspired so many women to continue their education, McEntire says she "jumped at the offer."

The film was shot on location in Nashville.

== Critical reception ==
Reviews for the film were mostly positive. In his review for Variety, Roy Loynd singled out Dalene Young's screenplay, saying it "ripples with surprises, constantly mining ore out of what at first appears to be mundane, familiar situations."

TV Guide was also positive in its review. They praised Keith Carradine's performance as McEntire's husband, saying he could "rank with Henry Fonda and James Stewart as the personification of common, unpretentious American decency."

== Release ==
The film originally aired on CBS on October 9, 1994.

It was subsequently released on DVD on July 5, 2005.

It is currently available to watch for free on the official Chicken Soup for the Soul YouTube channel.
