= Read My Mind (album) =

Studio album by Reba McEntire
- Released: April 26, 1994
- Studios: Emerald Sound Studios and Masterfonics (Nashville, Tennessee)
- Genre: Country
- Length: 38:10
- Label: MCA
- Producers: Tony Brown; Reba McEntire

Reba McEntire chronology
Greatest Hits Volume Two (1993)	Read My Mind (1994)	Oklahoma Girl (1994)

Singles from Read My Mind
- 1. "Why Haven't I Heard from You" Released: March 1994; 2. "She Thinks His Name Was John" Released: July 1994; 3. "Till You Love Me" Released: October 1994; 4. "The Heart Is a Lonely Hunter" Released: February 1995; 5. "And Still" Released: May 1995

Professional ratings
Review scores
Source	Rating
AllMusic	4/5 stars
Spin	(favorable)

Read My Mind is the nineteenth studio album by American country music artist Reba McEntire released on April 26, 1994, by MCA Records. It was preceded by the first single, "Why Haven't I Heard From You" which peaked at No. 5 on the country chart. The album's second single, "She Thinks His Name Was John", was the first country song to address the topic of AIDS. Due to the subject, some radio stations shied away from putting it into heavy rotation. The third single, "Till You Love Me" became McEntire's first song to chart on the Billboard Hot 100. "The Heart Is a Lonely Hunter" the album's fourth single, topped the country singles chart. The album peaked at No. 2 on both the country album chart and the Billboard 200 and is certified 3 times platinum by the RIAA. The album was released at perhaps the peak of McEntire's pop culture popularity, with a release of this album (described on an MCA Records billboard as "Another MCA Masterpiece..."), an autobiography, and NBC Television special later in the year.

On October 25, 2019 MCA released a 25th Anniversary Edition of Read My Mind featuring remastered versions of the original album tracks available in multiple formats including vinyl. The streaming, CD, and mp3 version includes a live recording of "And Still" recorded from her Australian tour.

== Track listing ==
No.	Title	Writer(s)	Length
1.	"Everything That You Want"	Randy Sharp; Jack Wesley Routh	4:24
2.	"Read My Mind"	Keith Thomas; Melissa Coleman; Todd Moore	3:59
3.	"I Won't Stand in Line"	Sharp; Steve Diamond	3:57
4.	"I Wish That I Could Tell You"	Tony Martin; Van Stephenson; Reese Wilson	3:19
5.	"She Thinks His Name Was John"	Sandy Knox; Steve Rosen	4:22
6.	"Why Haven't I Heard from You"	Knox; T.W. Hale	3:27
7.	"And Still"	Liz Hengber; Tommy Lee James	3:27
8.	"The Heart Is a Lonely Hunter"	Mark D. Sanders; Kim Williams; Ed Hill	3:50
9.	"I Wouldn't Wanna Be You"	Sharp; Jeff Silbar	3:34
10.	"Till You Love Me"	Bob DiPiero; Gary Burr	3:50

== Personnel ==
Vocals

- Reba McEntire – lead vocals
- Melissa Coleman – backing vocals
- Linda Davis – backing vocals
- Vince Gill – backing vocals
- Chris Harris – backing vocals
- Mark Heimermann – backing vocals
- Lang Scott – backing vocals
- Harry Stinson – backing vocals
- Bob Bailey – background vocals (6)
- Lisa Bevill – background vocals (6)
- Ashley Cleveland – background vocals (6)
- Kim Fleming – background vocals (6)
- Lisa Glasgow – background vocals (6)
- Vicki Hampton – background vocals (6)
- Yvonne Hodges – background vocals (6)
- Donna McElroy – background vocals (6)
- Michael Mellett – background vocals (6)
- Chris Rodriguez– background vocals (6)

Musicians

- Steve Nathan – acoustic piano, Hammond B3 organ, synthesizers
- Matt Rollings – acoustic piano, Wurlitzer electric piano, Hammond B3 organ, synthesizers
- Larry Byrom – acoustic guitar, electric guitar
- Dann Huff – electric guitar
- Biff Watson – acoustic guitar
- Terry Crisp – steel guitar
- Leland Sklar – bass
- Carlos Vega – drums
- Joe McGlohon – saxophone
- Michael Omartian – string arrangements and conductor
- Nashville String Machine – strings

=== Production ===
- Tony Brown – producer
- Reba McEntire – producer, make-up
- John Guess – recording engineer, mixing, overdub recording
- Derek Bason – recording assistant, mix assistant, overdub assistant
- Marty Williams – additional overdub recording
- Glenn Meadows – mastering
- Jessie Noble – product coordinator
- Cindy Owen – art direction, design
- Peter Nash – photography
- Sandi Spika – hair, wardrobe stylist
- Narvel Blackstock for Starstruck Entertainment – management

== Charts ==
=== Weekly charts ===
Chart (1994)	Peak position
Australian Albums (ARIA)	87
Canadian Albums (RPM)	12
Canadian Country Albums (RPM)	1
US Billboard 200	2
US Top Country Albums (Billboard)	2

=== Year-end charts ===
Chart (1994)	Position
US Billboard 200	65
US Top Country Albums (Billboard)	7
Chart (1995)	Position
US Billboard 200	79
US Top Country Albums (Billboard)	12
Chart (1996)	Position
US Top Country Albums (Billboard)	60

=== Singles ===
Year	Single	Peak chart positions		
Year	Single	US Country	US	CAN Country
1994	"Why Haven't I Heard from You"	5	101	4
1994	"She Thinks His Name Was John"	15	101	11
1994	"Till You Love Me"	2	78	8
1995	"The Heart Is a Lonely Hunter"	1	—	1
1995	"And Still"	2	—	1
"—" denotes releases that did not chart.

== Certifications and sales ==
Region	Certification	Certified units/sales
United States (RIAA)	3× Platinum	3,000,000^{^}
^{^} Shipments figures based on certification alone.
