= Love Needs a Holiday =

Single by Reba McEntire

from the album Reba #1's
- Released: January 30, 2006
- Genre: Country; contemporary country
- Length: 3:12
- Label: MCA Nashville
- Songwriter(s): Tony Haselden; Tim Mensy
- Producer(s): Buddy Cannon; Reba McEntire

Reba McEntire singles chronology
"You're Gonna Be (Always Loved by Me)" (2005)	"Love Needs a Holiday" (2006)	"Because of You" (2007)

"Love Needs a Holiday" is a song recorded by American country music artist Reba McEntire. The song was written by Tony Haselden and Tim Mensy, and produced by Buddy Cannon and McEntire. It was released on January 30, 2006, by MCA Nashville to country radio as the second and final single from her double-disc greatest hits album Reba Number 1's.

"Love Needs a Holiday" spent one week on the Hot Country Songs chart at number 60.

== Background and content ==
In 2005, McEntire released the greatest-hits album Reba Number 1's, which introduced the new recording "Love Needs a Holiday". The track was composed by Tony Haselden and Tim Mensy. McEntire recorded the song in 2005. It was co-produced by Buddy Cannon and McEntire.

== Release ==
Dan MacIntosh of Country Standard Time commented that the song "treats romantic doldrums with just a dash of humor." On January 10, 2006, "Love Needs a Holiday" was released as the album's second single. It was issued as a compact disc single on MCA Nashville Records.

== Commercial performance ==
"Love Needs a Holiday" spent one week on the Billboard Hot Country Songs in early February 2006, ranked at number 60.

The song also spent a week at number 46 on the Radio & Records Country Top 50 Indicator chart in early March 2006, with 108 total plays.

== Music video ==
A music video directed by Trey Fanjoy was released on March 10, 2006. The video was seen on TV stations Country Music Television and Great American Country.

== Track listing ==
CD single

- "Love Needs a Holiday" – 3:12

== Charts ==
Chart performance for "Love Needs a Holiday"
Chart (2006)	Peak position
US Hot Country Songs (Billboard)	60

== Release history ==
Release dates and format(s) for "Love Needs a Holiday"
Region	Date	Format(s)	Label(s)	Ref.
United States	January 30, 2006	Country radio	MCA Nashville	
