= It's Your Call =

Studio album by Reba McEntire
- Released: December 15, 1992
- Studios: Emerald Sound Studios and Masterfonics (Nashville, TN).
- Genre: Country
- Length: 35:02
- Label: MCA
- Producers: Tony Brown; Reba McEntire

Reba McEntire chronology
For My Broken Heart (1991)	It's Your Call (1992)	Greatest Hits Volume Two (1993)

Singles from It's Your Call
- 1. "Take It Back" Released: October 1992; 2. "The Heart Won't Lie" Released: February 1993; 3. "It's Your Call" Released: May 1993

Professional ratings
Review scores
Source	Rating
AllMusic	3/5 stars
Robert Christgau	C+
Entertainment Weekly	B
The Guardian	(favorable)
Los Angeles Times	2/4 stars
Music Week	3/4 stars
Orlando Sentinel	1/3 stars

It's Your Call is the eighteenth studio album by American country music artist Reba McEntire, released in December 1992. It contains the song "The Heart Won't Lie", which featured Vince Gill and which was later ranked at #18 on CMT's list of the 100 Greatest Country Duets. The album also includes a re-recording of the song "Baby's Gone Blues", which was recorded in 1987 by Patty Loveless for her album If My Heart Had Windows.

The album peaked at #1 on the country album chart and #8 on the Billboard 200, selling 104,000 copies in its first week, becoming her first top 10 album on that chart. It is certified 3× Multi-platinum by the RIAA.

McEntire referred to the album as a "second chapter to For My Broken Heart" (her previous album, released in 1991).

== Track listing ==
No.	Title	Writer(s)	Length
1.	"It's Your Call"	Bruce Burch, Shawna Harrington-Burkhart, Liz Hengber	3:04
2.	"Straight from You"	Gary Harrison, Tim Mensy	2:35
3.	"Take It Back"	Kristy Jackson	3:17
4.	"Baby's Gone Blues"	Pat Bunch, Mary Ann Kennedy, Pam Rose	4:15
5.	"The Heart Won't Lie" (duet with Vince Gill)	Kim Carnes, Donna Weiss	3:20
6.	"One Last Good Hand"	Gary Burr, John Jarrard	3:29
7.	"He Wants to Get Married"	Sandy Knox, Anthony Little	3:51
8.	"For Herself"	Harrington-Burkhart, Liz Hengber, Reba McEntire	3:59
9.	"Will He Ever Go Away"	Gerry House, Will Robinson	3:17
10.	"Lighter Shade of Blue"	Max D. Barnes, Skip Ewing, Troy Seals	3:24

== Personnel ==
As listed in liner notes.

- Reba McEntire – vocals, backing vocals
- John Barlow Jarvis – acoustic piano, synthesizers
- Matt Rollings – acoustic piano, synthesizers
- Steve Gibson – acoustic guitar, electric guitar
- George Marinelli, Jr. – electric guitar, acoustic guitar, mandolin
- Terry Crisp – steel guitar (1, 2)
- Michael Rhodes – bass
- Paul Leim – drums
- Joe McGlohon – saxophone (3)
- Linda Davis – backing vocals
- Vince Gill – backing vocals, vocals (5)
- Vicki Hampton – backing vocals
- Mary Ann Kennedy – backing vocals
- Donna McElroy – backing vocals
- Chris Rodriguez – backing vocals
- Jamie D. Robbins – backing vocals
- Pam Rose – backing vocals
- Harry Stinson – backing vocals

=== Production ===
- Tony Brown – producer
- Reba McEntire – producer, make-up
- John Guess – recording engineer, overdub recording, mixing
- Marty Williams – overdub recording, second engineer
- Glenn Meadows – digital editing, mastering
- Jessie Noble – project coordinator
- Mickey Braithwaite – art direction, design
- Jim "Señor" McGuire – photography
- Sandi Spika – hair, wardrobe
- Narvel Blackstock for Starstruck Entertainment – management

== Charts ==
=== Weekly charts ===
Chart (1992–1993)	Peak position
Canadian Albums (RPM)	59
Canadian Country Albums (RPM)	1
US Billboard 200	8
US Top Country Albums (Billboard)	1

=== Year-end charts ===
Chart (1993)	Position
US Billboard 200	19
US Top Country Albums (Billboard)	5

=== Certifications and sales ===
Region	Certification	Certified units/sales
Canada (Music Canada)	Platinum	100,000^{^}
United States (RIAA)	3× Platinum	3,000,000^{^}
^{^} Shipments figures based on certification alone.

=== Singles ===
Year	Single	Peak chart positions		
Year	Single	US Country	US	CAN Country
1992	"Take It Back"	5	—	1
1993	"The Heart Won't Lie" (with Vince Gill)	1	—	1
1993	"It's Your Call"	5	110	5
"—" denotes releases that did not chart.
