= If You See Him =

Studio album by Reba McEntire
- Released: June 2, 1998
- Studios: Starstruck Studios and Sound Stage Studios (Nashville, Tennessee); A&M Studios (Hollywood, California)
- Genre: Country
- Length: 45:02
- Label: MCA Nashville
- Producers: David Malloy; Reba McEntire; Tony Brown; Tim DuBois

Reba McEntire chronology
| What If It's You (1996) | If You See Him (1998) | The Secret of Giving: A Christmas Collection (1999) |

Singles from If You See Him
- 1. "If You See Him/If You See Her" Released: April 27, 1998; 2. "Forever Love" Released: July 1998; 3. "Wrong Night" Released: November 1998; 4. "One Honest Heart" Released: March 1999

Professional ratings
Review scores
| Source | Rating |
|---|---|
| Allmusic | 2.5/5 stars |

If You See Him is the twenty-second studio album by American country music singer Reba McEntire released on June 2, 1998. The lead single was "If You See Him/If You See Her", a duet with Brooks & Dunn, which was concurrently released on Brooks & Dunn's corresponding album If You See Her; the song reached Number One on the Hot Country Songs charts in 1998. "Forever Love", "Wrong Night" and "One Honest Heart" were all released as singles from the album as well, all of which reached Top 10 on the same chart.

The album debuted at number 2 on the Country Albums chart and number 8 on the Billboard 200 for the week dated June 20, 1998, with 93,000 copies sold in the first week. It stayed in the Top 10 for 13 weeks on the former.

The album was released as an Enhanced CD, featuring a multimedia presentation that included behind-the-scenes videos and pictures.

A bonus limited edition EP was made available when consumers bought both If You See Him and Brooks & Dunn's If You See Her at the same time.

== Track listing ==
| No. | Title | Writer(s) | Length |
|---|---|---|---|
| 1. | "If You See Him/If You See Her" (with Brooks & Dunn) | Jennifer Kimball, Tommy Lee James, Terry McBride | 3:51 |
| 2. | "One Honest Heart" | David Malloy, Gary Baker, Frank J. Myers | 3:53 |
| 3. | "I Wouldn't Know" | Marc Beeson, Robert Byrne, Mike McGuire | 3:30 |
| 4. | "I'll Give You Something to Miss" | Beeson, Byrne, McGuire | 3:30 |
| 5. | "Invisible" | Lisa Drew, Christi Dannemiller | 4:05 |
| 6. | "Up and Flying" | Gary Burr, Patty Griffin | 4:32 |
| 7. | "Forever Love" | Liz Hengber, Deanna Bryant, Sunny Russ | 3:53 |
| 8. | "Face to Face" (with Linda Davis) | Burr, Malloy | 3:55 |
| 9. | "Heart Hush" | Brett Jones | 4:15 |
| 10. | "Lonely Alone" | Reese Wilson | 3:24 |
| 11. | "Wrong Night" | Rick Bowles, Josh Leo | 2:51 |
| 12. | "All This Time" | James, Greg Guidry | 3:11 |
| Total length: | | | 45:02 |

Limited Edition Bonus CD (Live in Australia)
| No. | Title | Writer(s) | Length |
|---|---|---|---|
| 1. | "The Heart Is A Lonely Hunter" | Mark D. Sanders, Kim Williams, Ed Hill |
| 2. | "And Still" | Liz Hengber, Tommy Lee James |
| 3. | "The Greatest Man I Ever Knew" | Richard Leigh, Layng Martine, Jr. |
| 4. | "The Fear Of Being Alone" | Walt Aldridge, Bruce Miller |
| 5. | "Sweet Dreams" | Don Gibson |

Exclusive Collector's Edition - Bonus EP
| No. | Title | Writer(s) | Length |
|---|---|---|---|
| 1. | "All of You" (Reba McEntire) | Anna Wilson, Rebecca Maples, Robert Ellis Orrall | 3:25 |
| 2. | "Steady as She Goes" (Brooks & Dunn) | Don Cook, Kix Brooks, Ronnie Dunn | 3:28 |
| 3. | "I'll Take Your Heart" (Reba McEntire) | Robert John "Mutt" Lange | 4:33 |
| 4. | "What It's Come Down To" (Brooks & Dunn) | Lewis Anderson | 4:03 |

== Personnel ==
Per the liner notes.

- Reba McEntire – lead vocals
- John Barlow Jarvis – Rhodes electric piano (1), acoustic piano (2–12)
- Randy McCormick – synthesizers (1)
- Jimmy Nichols – keyboards (2–12), backing vocals (2–12)
- Bobby All – acoustic guitar (1)
- Mark Casstevens – acoustic guitar (1)
- Larry Byrom – electric guitar (1)
- Brent Mason – electric guitar (1)
- Dann Huff – electric guitar (2–12)
- Jeff King – electric guitar (2–12)
- Jerry McPherson – electric guitar (2–12)
- B. James Lowry – acoustic guitar (2–12)
- Bruce Bouton – steel guitar (1)
- Paul Franklin – steel guitar (2–12)
- Rob Hajacos – fiddle (1)
- Larry Franklin – fiddle (2–12), mandolin (2–12)
- Michael Rhodes – bass (1)
- Richard "Spady" Brannan – bass (2–12)
- Lonnie Wilson – drums (1)
- Paul Leim – drums (2–12)
- Kix Brooks – backing vocals (1)
- Ronnie Dunn – lead vocals (1)
- John Wesley Ryles – backing vocals (1)
- Cynthia French – backing vocals (2–12)
- Lisa Gregg – backing vocals (2–12)
- Liana Manis – backing vocals (2–12)
- Kim Parent – backing vocals (2–12)
- Curtis Young – backing vocals (2–12)
- Linda Davis – lead vocals (8)

=== Production ===
- Tony Brown – producer (1)
- Tim DuBois – producer (1)
- David Malloy – producer (2–12)
- Reba McEntire – producer (2–12)
- Kevin Beamish – recording, mixing
- John Aguto – vocal recording (7, 12)
- Derek Bason – recording assistant, mix assistant, additional recording, digital editing, BGV recording (7, 12)
- Scott McCutcheon – additional recording assistant
- J.R. Rodriguez – additional recording assistant
- Tony Green – BGV recording assistant (7, 12)
- Denny Purcell – mastering at Georgetown Masters (Nashville, Tennessee)
- Carole Ann Mobley – production coordinator, creative assistant
- Cindy Owen – art direction
- Karen Cronin – design
- Dana Fineman – principal photography
- Timothy White – photography
- Sandi Spika – wardrobe stylist
- Wayne Scot Lukas – wardrobe
- Fran Cooper – make-up
- Troy Jensen – make-up
- Stephen Knoll – hair
- Narvel Blackstock for Starstruck Entertainment – representation

== Charts ==
=== Weekly charts ===
| Chart (1998) | Peak position |
|---|---|
| Australian Albums (ARIA) | 52 |
| Canadian Albums (RPM) | 54 |
| Canadian Country Albums (RPM) | 7 |
| US Billboard 200 | 8 |
| US Top Country Albums (Billboard) | 2 |

=== Year-end charts ===
| Chart (1998) | Position |
|---|---|
| US Billboard 200 | 120 |
| US Top Country Albums (Billboard) | 15 |
| Chart (1999) | Position |
| US Top Country Albums (Billboard) | 44 |

=== Singles ===
| Year | Single | Peak chart positions | | |
| Year | Single | US Country | US | CAN Country |
|---|---|---|---|---|
| 1998 | "If You See Him/If You See Her" | 1 | — | 1 |
| 1998 | "Forever Love" | 4 | — | 4 |
| 1999 | "Wrong Night" | 6 | 52 | 6 |
| 1999 | "One Honest Heart" | 7 | 54 | 5 |

== Certifications and sales ==
| Region | Certification | Certified units/sales |
|---|---|---|
| Canada (Music Canada) | Gold | 50,000^{^} |
| United States (RIAA) | Platinum | 1,000,000^{^} |
^{^} Shipments figures based on certification alone.
