= For My Broken Heart =

Studio album by Reba McEntire
- Released: October 1, 1991
- Studios: Emerald Sound Studios and Masterfonics (Nashville, Tennessee)
- Genre: Country
- Length: 36:54
- Label: MCA
- Producers: Tony Brown; Reba McEntire

Reba McEntire chronology
Rumor Has It (1990)	For My Broken Heart (1991)	It's Your Call (1992)

Singles from For My Broken Heart
- 1. "For My Broken Heart" Released: September 30, 1991; 2. "Is There Life Out There" Released: January 28, 1992; 3. "The Night the Lights Went Out in Georgia" Released: April 1992; 4. "The Greatest Man I Never Knew" Released: July 1992

Professional ratings
Review scores
Source	Rating
AllMusic	link
Calgary Herald	B
Entertainment Weekly	A-link

For My Broken Heart is the seventeenth studio album by American country music singer Reba McEntire, released on October 1, 1991. It was the first studio album recorded after an airplane crash that killed most of the members of her touring band. The album is, as McEntire states in the album's notes, "a form of healing for all our broken hearts" and the songs were chosen to that effect.

The album was led off by its title track, which was followed by "Is There Life Out There". "The Night the Lights Went Out in Georgia", originally a 1972 hit for Vicki Lawrence, was also accompanied by a video when it was released as the album's third single. It became her highest-charting album on the Billboard 200 chart at that time, peaking at number 13. It is also one of McEntire's biggest-selling studio albums - selling 4 million copies.

The album debuted at number 4 for the week of October 19, 1991. It peaked at number 3 for the week of November 2, 1991. It stayed at number 3 for 7 consecutive weeks. It stayed in the Top Ten for 20 consecutive weeks. It was the first album by a female country artist to be certified 2× platinum by the RIAA.

== Track listing ==
No.	Title	Writer(s)	Length
1.	"For My Broken Heart"	Liz Hengber, Keith Palmer	4:18
2.	"Is There Life Out There"	Susan Longacre, Rick Giles	3:52
3.	"Bobby"	Reba McEntire, Don Schlitz	4:37
4.	"He's in Dallas"	Donny Kees, Richard Ross, Johnny MacRae	3:05
5.	"All Dressed Up (With Nowhere to Go)"	Lisa Palas, Biff Fink, Ira Rogers	3:13
6.	"The Night the Lights Went Out in Georgia"	Bobby Russell	4:17
7.	"Buying Her Roses"	Joe Doyle, Rick Peoples	2:52
8.	"The Greatest Man I Never Knew"	Richard Leigh, Layng Martine Jr.	3:14
9.	"I Wouldn't Go That Far"	Dana McVicker, Bruce Burch, Vip Vipperman	3:26
10.	"If I Had Only Known"	Jana Stanfield, Craig Morris	4:00

== Personnel ==
- Reba McEntire – vocals
- John Barlow Jarvis – keyboards
- Matt Rollings – keyboards
- Steve Gibson – acoustic guitar, electric guitar
- Michael Thompson – electric guitar
- Steve Fishell – steel guitar
- John Hughey – steel guitar
- Mark O'Connor – fiddle, mandolin
- Leland Sklar – bass
- Larrie Londin – drums
- Bob Bailey – backing vocals (1, 6)
- Kim Fleming – backing vocals (1, 6)
- Vicki Hampton – backing vocals (1, 6)
- Yvonne Hodges – backing vocals (1, 6)
- Pamela Quinlan – backing vocals (1, 6)
- Linda Davis – backing vocals
- Vince Gill – backing vocals
- Harry Stinson – backing vocals

=== Production ===
- Tony Brown – producer
- Reba McEntire – producer, hair, make-up, wardrobe
- John Guess – recording, overdub recording, mixing, mastering
- Marty Williams – overdub recording, second engineer
- Milan Bogdan – digital editing
- Glenn Meadows – mastering
- Jessie Noble – project coordinator
- Mickey Braithwaite – art direction, design
- Jim "Señor" McGuire – photography
- Sandi Spika – hair, make-up, wardrobe
- Narvel Blackstock for Starstruck Entertainment – management

== Charts ==
=== Weekly charts ===
Chart (1991–92)	Peak position
Australian Albums (ARIA)	171
Canadian Albums (RPM)	78
Canadian Country Albums(RPM)	1
US Billboard 200	13
US Top Country Albums (Billboard)	3

=== Year-end charts ===
Chart (1991)	Position
US Top Country Albums (Billboard)	71
Chart (1992)	Position
US Billboard 200	32
US Top Country Albums (Billboard)	7
Chart (1993)	Position
US Top Country Albums (Billboard)	38

=== Singles ===
Year	Song	Chart positions	
Year	Song	US Country	CAN Country
1991	"For My Broken Heart"	1	1
1992	"Is There Life Out There"	1	1
1992	"The Night The Lights Went Out in Georgia"	12	7
1992	"The Greatest Man I Never Knew"	3	1
"—" denotes releases that did not chart.

== Certifications and sales ==
Region	Certification	Certified units/sales
United States (RIAA)	4× Platinum	4,000,000^{^}
^{^} Shipments figures based on certification alone.
