= Dixiana (band) =

American country music band

- Promo photo of Dixianna

Background information
- Origin: Nashville, Tennessee, U.S.
- Genres: Country
- Years active: 1986–1993
- Label: Epic
- Past members: Randall Griffith; Mark Lister; Phil Lister; Cindy Murphy; Colonel Shuford

Dixiana was an American country music band. Founded in 1986 the band was composed of five members: brothers Mark (bass guitar, vocals) and Phil Lister (guitar, vocals), Randall Griffith (keyboards), Colonel Shuford (drums), and Cindy Murphy (lead vocals).

They were signed to Epic Records in 1992 and they released their self-titled debut album in the same year. It produced three singles, two of which charted on the Billboard Hot Country Singles & Tracks (now Hot Country Songs) charts. The album received a C− rating from Entertainment Weekly, who described it as "generic country-pop" but highlighted lead vocalist Murphy as a "strong suit". A fourth single, "Now You're Talkin'", was released in 1993. Joseph Stanley of Cash Box praised it as a "fresh and fun cut".

Mark and Phil Lister co-founded a recording studio called Dixiana Music since the album was released.

== Discography ==
=== Dixiana ===
Dixiana

Studio album by Dixiana
- Released: April 21, 1992
- Studio: The Bennett House
- Genre: Country
- Length: 30:55
- Label: Epic Records
- Producer: Bob Montgomery

Professional ratings
Review scores
| Source | Rating |
|---|---|
| AllMusic | 4/5 stars |

| No. | Title | Writer(s) | Length |
|---|---|---|---|
| 1. | "I Didn't Think You'd Care" | Byron Gallimore; Don Pfrimmer | 3:24 |
| 2. | "A Heart That Can't Be Had" | Steve Seskin; Allen Shamblin | 3:18 |
| 3. | "Waitin' for the Deal to Go Down" | Bobby Fischer; Charlie Black; Austin Roberts | 3:13 |
| 4. | "Are You Over Her" | Gail Farrell | 3:11 |
| 5. | "It Comes and It Goes" | Robert Ellis Orrall; Fischer | 3:33 |
| 6. | "That's What I'm Working on Tonight" | Lonnie Williams; Nancy Williams; Mary W. Francis | 2:35 |
| 7. | "I Know Where There's One" | Kerry Kurt Phillips; Tammy Pierce | 3:23 |
| 8. | "Chain of Heartaches" | Pfrimmer; George Teren | 3:01 |
| 9. | "If I Can't Have You" | Stephony Smith | 2:43 |
| 10. | "A Little in Love" | Michael Noble; Jeff Pennig; Scott "Cactus" Moser | 2:34 |
| Total length: | | | 30:55 |

==== The Band ====
- Cindy Murphy – Vocals, Background singer
- Mark Lister – Bass, Background singer
- Phil Lister – Guitar, Mandolin, Strings, Background singer
- Randall Griffith – Keyboards
- Colonel Shuford – Drums

==== Additional Musicians ====
- Ron Oates – Keyboards, Arranger
- Lonnie Wilson – Drums
- Bob Wray – Bass
- Dave Pomeroy – Bass
- Tim Mensy – Acoustic guitar
- Bill Hullett – Acoustic guitar
- Brent Mason – Electric guitar
- Jonathan Yudkin – Mandolin
- Tommy Spurlock – Steel guitar

==== Production ====
- Denny Purcell – Mastering
- Gene Eichelberger – Engineer, Mixer
- Shawn McLean – Back-up engineer
- Roy Gamble – Back-up engineer
- Jake Nicely – Back-up engineer
- Cathy Moore – Production assistant
- Randee St. Nicholas – Photography
- Bill Johnson – Art direction
- Jodi Lynn Miller – Design assistant

Track information and credits verified from the album's liner notes.

== Charts ==
=== Singles ===
| Year | Single | Peak chart positions | | Album |
| Year | Single | US Country | CAN Country | Album |
|---|---|---|---|---|
| 1992 | "Waitin' for the Deal to Go Down" | 39 | 27 | Dixiana |
| 1992 | "That's What I'm Working On Tonight" | 40 | 52 | Dixiana |
| 1992 | "I Know Where There's One" | — | — | Dixiana |
| 1993 | "Now You're Talkin'" | 66 | 70 | —N/a |
"—" denotes releases that did not chart

=== Music videos ===
| Year | Video | Director |
|---|---|---|
| 1992 | "Waitin' for the Deal to Go Down" | Deaton Flanigen |
| 1992 | "That's What I'm Working on Tonight" | Michael Merriman |
| 1993 | "Now You're Talkin'" | Chris Rogers |
