= One Honest Heart =

Single by Reba McEntire

from the album If You See Him
- B-side: "I'll Give You Something to Miss"
- Released: March 30, 1999
- Genre: Country
- Length: 3:53
- Label: MCA Nashville 72094
- Songwriters: David Malloy; Gary Baker; Frank J. Myers
- Producers: David Malloy; Reba McEntire

Reba McEntire singles chronology
"Wrong Night" (1998)	"One Honest Heart" (1999)	"What Do You Say" (1999)

"One Honest Heart" is a song written by David Malloy, Gary Baker and Frank J. Myers, and recorded by American country music artist Reba McEntire. It was released on March 30, 1999 as the fourth and final single from her album, If You See Him. The song reached #7 on the Billboard Hot Country Singles & Tracks chart in July 1999.

She promoted the song by singing it on A&E's Reba Live by Request and the 1999 Academy of Country Music Awards.

== Chart performance ==
Chart (1999)	Peak position
Canada Country Singles (RPM)	5
US Billboard Hot 100	54
US Hot Country Songs (Billboard)	7

=== Year-end charts ===
Chart (1999)	Position
Canada Country Tracks (RPM)	50
US Country Songs (Billboard)	55
