= Rumor Has It (Reba McEntire album) =

Studio album by Reba McEntire
- Released: September 4, 1990
- Recorded: April 2–15, 1990
- Studios: Emerald Sound Studios and Masterfonics (Nashville, Tennessee)
- Genre: Country
- Length: 38:23
- Label: MCA
- Producers: Tony Brown; Reba McEntire

Reba McEntire chronology
Reba Live (1989)	Rumor Has It (1990)	For My Broken Heart (1991)

Singles from Rumor Has It
- 1. "You Lie" Released: August 25, 1990; 2. "Rumor Has It" Released: November 5, 1990; 3. "Fancy" Released: February 11, 1991; 4. "Fallin' Out of Love" Released: May 6, 1991

Professional ratings
Review scores
Source	Rating
AllMusic	3.5/5 stars
Calgary Herald	B
Entertainment Weekly	A
Los Angeles Times	2/4 stars

Rumor Has It is the sixteenth studio album by American country music artist Reba McEntire. It was released on September 4, 1990, by MCA Records.

== Singles ==
The album's lead single, "You Lie", was released as on August 25, 1990. The song reached number one on the Hot Country Songs chart and on the Canada Country Tracks chart.

"Rumor Has It" was released as the second single on November 26, 1990. It debuted at 42 on the Hot Country Songs chart the week of December 1, 1990, and eventually peaked at number three. It peaked at number on the Canada Country Tracks chart.

The third single, "Fancy", a Bobbie Gentry cover, was released on February 11, 1991. It peaked at number eight on both the Hot Country Songs and Canada Country Tracks charts. "Fancy" is certified double platinum and as of November 2019, has sold 760,000 digital copies in the United States. Rolling Stone ranked McEntire's version of the song at #65 on their 200 Greatest Country Songs of All Time ranking in 2024.

The album's final single, "Fallin' Out of Love", was released on May 6, 1991. "Fallin' Out of Love" peaked at number two on the Hot Country Songs chart and number one on the Canada Country Tracks chart,

== Track listing ==
No.	Title	Writer(s)	Length
1.	"Climb That Mountain High"	Reba McEntire; Don Schlitz	2:51
2.	"Rumor Has It"	Bruce Burch; Vern Dant; Larry Shell	3:48
3.	"Waitin' for the Deal to Go Down"	Bobby Fischer; Austin Roberts; Charles Black	3:14
4.	"You Lie"	Fischer; Roberts; Black	3:59
5.	"Now You Tell Me"	Donny Kees, Shawna Harrington-Burkhart	3:36
6.	"Fancy"	Bobbie Gentry	4:58
7.	"Fallin' Out of Love"	Jon Ims	4:34
8.	"This Picture"	S. Alan Taylor; Lisa Palas	3:23
9.	"You Remember Me"	Jesse Winchester	4:23
10.	"That's All She Wrote"	Joe Schemay; John Hobbs	3:24

== Reception and legacy ==
The album continued her streak of success and features one of her signature songs, a cover of Bobbie Gentry's 1969 hit "Fancy", of which CMT ranked at No. 27 on its list of the 100 Greatest Country Songs in 2003. Additionally, they ranked the video at No. 35 on their list of 100 Greatest Country Videos. "Fancy" wasn't one of McEntire's larger radio hits, despite its acclaim. It peaked outside of the Top 5 at No. 8. The album peaked at No. 2 on the Billboard country album chart and No. 39 on the Billboard 200, becoming her first album to enter the mainstream top 40. It was certified triple platinum by the RIAA. Rumor Has It was McEntire's first collaboration with record producer Tony Brown.

The album also contained a TV theme song - though not the last TV theme song McEntire would record. The track "Climb That Mountain High" was featured in the opening credits of the early 1990s ABC sitcom, Delta starring Delta Burke, who played an aspiring country singer. McEntire also made a guest appearance on the short-lived sitcom.

Both "You Lie" and "Waitin' For the Deal to Go Down" were previously recorded by country singer Cee Cee Chapman on her 1988 album Twist of Fate, and the latter was covered in 1992 by the short-lived country music band Dixiana on their self-titled album. Their version was released as a single that year, peaking at #39 on the country charts.

The album debuted at #17 on the Billboard Top Country Albums for the week of September 29, 1990, and jumped to number 3 the next week then peaked at #2 the next week. The album stayed in the Top 10 for 26 weeks.

A 30th Anniversary Edition of the album was released on September 11, 2020, and includes two bonus tracks: a new remix of "Fancy" by Dave Audé and a live version of "Fancy" recorded at the Ryman Auditorium in 2020. The remix version was not included on the LP vinyl release of the 30th Anniversary Edition. In 2026, the album was selected by the Library of Congress for preservation in the National Recording Registry for its "cultural, historical or aesthetic importance in the nation's recorded sound heritage."

== Personnel ==
Vocals

- Reba McEntire – lead vocals, backing vocals
- Bob Bailey – backing vocals
- Kim Fleming – backing vocals
- Vince Gill – backing vocals
- Vicki Hampton – backing vocals
- Yvonne Hodges – backing vocals
- Pamela Quillon – backing vocals
- Harry Stinson – backing vocals
- Paula Kaye Wallace – backing vocals
- Suzy Wills – backing vocals

Musicians

- John Barlow Jarvis – keyboards
- Matt Rollings – keyboards
- Kirk Cappello – synthesizers
- Steve Gibson – acoustic guitars, electric guitar, slide guitar, mandolin
- Dann Huff – electric guitar
- Steve Fishell – steel guitar
- Edgar Meyer – arco bass
- Michael Rhodes – bass guitar
- Larrie Londin – drums

Production

- Tony Brown – producer
- Reba McEntire – producer, make-up
- John Guess – recording, mixing, mastering
- Marty Williams – second engineer
- Milan Bogdan – digital editing
- Glenn Meadows – mastering
- Jessie Noble – project coordinator
- Mickey Braithwaite – art direction, design
- Jim "Señor" McGuire – photography
- Paul Elledge – back cover photography
- Linda DeMith – make-up
- Sheri McCoy – wardrobe
- Ann Payne-Rice – wardrobe

== Charts ==
=== Weekly charts ===
Chart (1990)	Peak position
US Billboard 200	39
US Top Country Albums (Billboard)	2

=== Year-end charts ===
Chart (1990)	Position
US Top Country Albums (Billboard)	65
Chart (1991)	Position
US Billboard 200	63
US Top Country Albums (Billboard)	4

=== Singles ===
Year	Song	Chart positions	
Year	Song	US Country	CAN Country
1990	"You Lie"	1	1
1990	"Rumor Has It"	3	1
1991	"Fancy"	8	8
1991	"Fallin' Out of Love"	2	1

== Certifications and sales ==
Region	Certification	Certified units/sales
United States (RIAA)	3× Platinum	3,000,000^{^}
^{^} Shipments figures based on certification alone.
