= Wrong Night =

Single by Reba McEntire

from the album If You See Him
- B-side: "Up and Flying"
- Released: October 23, 1998
- Genre: Country
- Length: 2:51
- Label: MCA Nashville 72075
- Songwriters: Rick Bowles; Josh Leo
- Producers: David Malloy; Reba McEntire

Reba McEntire singles chronology
"Forever Love" (1998)	"Wrong Night" (1998)	"One Honest Heart" (1999)

"Wrong Night" is a song written by Josh Leo and Rick Bowles, and recorded by American country music artist Reba McEntire. It was released on October 23, 1998 as the third single from her album If You See Him. The song reached #6 on the Billboard Hot Country Singles & Tracks chart in February 1999.

== Chart performance ==
Chart (1998–1999)	Peak position
Canada Country Singles (RPM)	6
US Billboard Hot 100	52
US Hot Country Songs (Billboard)	6

=== Year-end charts ===
Chart (1999)	Position
Canada Country Tracks (RPM)	45
US Country Songs (Billboard)	44
