= Fallin' Out of Love =

Single by Reba McEntire

from the album Rumor Has It
- B-side: "Now You Tell Me"
- Released: May 1991
- Genre: Country
- Length: 4:34
- Label: MCA 54108
- Songwriter: Jon Ims
- Producers: Tony Brown; Reba McEntire

Reba McEntire singles chronology
"Fancy" (1991)	"Fallin' Out of Love" (1991)	"For My Broken Heart" (1991)

"Fallin' Out of Love" is a song written by Jon Ims, and recorded by American country music artist Reba McEntire. It was released in May 1991 as the fourth and final single from her album Rumor Has It. The song reached #2 on the Billboard Hot Country Singles & Tracks chart in August 1991.

== Content ==
In the song, the narrator is addressing a woman who has been suddenly abandoned by her lover for another woman. The woman is heartbroken, but while driving around town to clear her mind, has an ephiphany: she can live without him. One day, her old lover calls her (apparently wanting to get back together), but she informs him that she's moved on.

== Chart performance ==
Chart (1991)	Peak position
Canada Country Singles (RPM)	1
US Hot Country Songs (Billboard)	2

=== Year-end charts ===
Chart (1991)	Position
Canada Country Tracks (RPM)	12
US Country Songs (Billboard)	36
