= She Thinks His Name Was John =

Single by Reba McEntire

Single by Reba McEntire

from the album Read My Mind
- B-side: "I Wish That I Could Tell You"
- Released: July 30, 1994
- Recorded: 1994
- Genre: Country
- Length: 4:22
- Label: MCA
- Songwriters: Sandy Knox; Steve Rosen
- Producers: Tony Brown; Reba McEntire

Reba McEntire singles chronology
| "Why Haven't I Heard from You" (1994) | "She Thinks His Name Was John" (1994) | "Till You Love Me" (1994) |

Music video
- "She Thinks His Name Was John" on YouTube

"She Thinks His Name Was John" is a song written by Sandy Knox and Steve Rosen, and recorded by American country music icon Reba McEntire. It was released in July 1994 by MCA Records as the second single from her nineteenth studio album, Read My Mind (1994). It was produced by McEntire with Tony Brown. Upon its release, the song gained media attention and controversy for its storyline, regarding a woman who was dying from AIDS.

== Content ==
"She Thinks His Name Was John" tells the story of a woman who is dying from AIDS, which she acquired after becoming intoxicated and having a one-night stand with a man whom she did not previously know. The song recounts how, upon learning she has contracted AIDS, she struggles to remember the man with whom she had her affair; she cries herself to sleep over dreams and life's milestones she will never experience, (such as marriage and motherhood); and how former friends pity her because of the decision that led to her illness.

Sandy Knox, one of the song's writers, was inspired to write "She Thinks His Name Was John" after losing her brother to the disease. The song was released as a single after several radio stations began playing it as an album cut.

== Critical reception ==
Upon the release, Larry Flick from Billboard magazine wrote, "It takes courage to release a single about a woman dying of AIDS in the midst of all the summertime fluff. But McEntire traffics (and triumphs) in risk-taking. The leaden, monotonous cadence perfectly matches the bleakness of the theme."

== Charts ==
| Chart (1994) | Peak position |
|---|---|
| Canada Country Singles (RPM) | 11 |
| US Bubbling Under Hot 100 Singles (Billboard) | 1 |
| US Hot Country Songs (Billboard) | 15 |
