= Cee Cee Chapman =

American country music singer-songwriter

- Born: Melissa Carol Chapman; December 13, 1958 (age 67); Portsmouth, Virginia
- Genres: Country
- Occupation: Singer-songwriter
- Instrument: Guitar
- Years active: 1988–1993
- Labels: Curb, Capitol

Cee Cee Chapman (born Melissa Carol Chapman on December 13, 1958 in Portsmouth, Virginia) is an American country music singer-songwriter. Chapman was signed to Curb Records. She charted five singles on the Billboard Hot Country Singles & Tracks chart.

Chapman was nominated for Top New Female Vocalist at the 1988 Academy of Country Music Awards. She was also nominated for Favorite Country New Artist at the American Music Awards of 1990.

Jack Hurst of the Chicago Tribune gave Chapman's eponymous second album three stars out of four, calling her a "straight-ahead singer" who "attacks almost any kind of song here with obvious personal involvement that is often stunning." The album also received a favorable review from People, which stated that it was "characterized by intelligent song selection" and that Chapman "at times [sounds] like Cher gone down-home."

== Discography ==
=== Albums ===
Title	Album details
Twist of Fate	Release date: 1988; Label: Curb Records
Cee Cee Chapman	Release date: August 27, 1990; Label: Curb/Capitol Records

=== Singles ===
Year	Single	Peak positions	Album
Year	Single	US Country	Album
1988	"Gone but Not Forgotten" (with Santa Fe)	60	Twist of Fate
1989	"Frontier Justice"	51	Twist of Fate
1989	"Twist of Fate"	49	Twist of Fate
1989	"Love Is a Liar"	64	Twist of Fate
1990	"Everything"	—	Cee Cee Chapman
1991	"Exit 99"	—	Cee Cee Chapman
1991	"What Would Elvis Do"	—	Cee Cee Chapman
1992	"A Winter's Night"	—	Twist of Fate
1992	"Two Ships That Passed in the Moonlight"	64	Cee Cee Chapman
"—" denotes releases that did not chart

=== Music videos ===
Year	Video	Director
1989	"Twist of Fate"	
1990	"Everything"	Greg Crutcher
1992	"A Winters Night"	
1992	"Two Ships That Passed in the Moonlight"	
