= Take It Back (Reba McEntire song) =

Single by Reba McEntire

from the album It's Your Call
- B-side: "Baby's Gone Blues"
- Released: October 1992
- Genre: Country, blues rock
- Length: 3:17
- Label: MCA 54544
- Songwriter: Kristy Jackson
- Producers: Tony Brown; Reba McEntire

Reba McEntire singles chronology
| "The Greatest Man I Never Knew" (1992) | "Take It Back" (1992) | "The Heart Won't Lie" (1993) |

"Take It Back" is a song written by Kristy Jackson, and recorded by American country music artist Reba McEntire. It was released in October 1992 as the first single from her album, It's Your Call. The song reached #5 on the Billboard Hot Country Singles & Tracks chart in February 1993.

== Music video ==
The song's video was directed by Jon Small and released in late 1992. Set in a courtroom, it features actor and comedy writer Pat McCormick playing a courtroom judge. The song actually starts about a minute into the video, after the judge calls Reba up to testify against her witness (who is accused of cheating on her) She angrily throws things at him in anger, and the courtroom eventually starts to dance as the sax solo plays. In the end, Reba wins the case and angrily storms out of the room, as the defendant shakes hands with the judge.

== Chart performance ==
The song debuted at #57 on the US Billboard Hot Country Singles chart for the week of November 21, 1992, and it peaked at #5 for the week of February 13, 1993

| Chart (1992–1993) | Peak position |
|---|---|
| Canada Country Singles (RPM) | 1 |
| US Hot Country Songs (Billboard) | 5 |

=== Year-end charts ===
| Chart (1993) | Position |
|---|---|
| Canada Country Tracks (RPM) | 10 |
| US Country Songs (Billboard) | 74 |
