= For My Broken Heart (song) =

Single by Reba McEntire

from the album For My Broken Heart
- B-side: "Bobby"
- Released: September 30, 1991
- Genre: Country
- Length: 4:18 (album version); 3:36 (radio edit)
- Label: MCA
- Songwriters: Keith Palmer, Liz Hengber
- Producers: Tony Brown and Reba McEntire

Reba McEntire singles chronology
"Fallin' Out of Love" (1991)	"For My Broken Heart" (1991)	"Is There Life Out There" (1992)

"For My Broken Heart" is a song written by Keith Palmer and Liz Hengber, and recorded by American country music singer Reba McEntire. It was released in September 1991 as the first single and title track from her album For My Broken Heart. The song was a Number One hit for McEntire, topping the country singles charts in both the U.S. and Canada.

== Content ==
"For My Broken Heart" chronicles a failed relationship. In the first verse, the male is packing up his belongings and then leaving. After falling asleep on the couch, she reluctantly wakes up and, despite being "so sure life wouldn't go on" without him, she says "I guess the world didn't stop for my broken heart." The song's radio edit omits a string section prelude, the radio edit is included on McEntire's Greatest Hits Volume Two compilation album, but the full album version including the prelude is included on her Reba 1's and 50 Greatest Hits compilation albums.

McEntire originally planned to record the song as a duet with Clint Black, but he was unavailable at the time.

== Music video ==
The song's music video was directed by Jack Cole and shows four women dealing with heartbreak during a rainy night. Three of them are: a young, white woman sitting at a corner booth at a cafe, a middle-aged black woman in her apartment, and an elderly, white woman, also in her apartment. The fourth woman is Reba herself, clad in a blue nightgown. Reba sings the song while the other three women lip sync along with her. The video ends the next morning, with each of the women over their heartbreak and going about their lives.

The video uses the radio edit of the song which omits the string section prelude at the beginning of the album version.

== Chart positions ==
"For My Broken Heart" debuted at number 64 on the Billboard Hot Country Singles & Tracks (now Hot Country Songs) charts dated for October 12, 1991. It peaked at number 1 on the chart dated for December 7, 1991 and held the position for two weeks. The song was also a number one country hit in Canada, holding that position on the RPM Country Tracks chart dated for December 21.

Chart (1991)	Peak position
Canada Country Singles (RPM)	1
US Hot Country Songs (Billboard)	1

=== Year-end charts ===
Chart (1991)	Position
Canada Country Tracks (RPM)	88
