= Whoever's in New England (song) =

Single by Reba McEntire

from the album Whoever's in New England
- B-side: "Can't Stop Now"
- Released: January 27, 1986
- Recorded: Fall 1985
- Genre: Country
- Length: 3:25
- Label: MCA Nashville
- Songwriter(s): Kendal Franceschi; Quentin Powers
- Producer(s): Jimmy Bowen; Reba McEntire

Reba McEntire singles chronology
"Only in My Mind" (1985)	"Whoever's in New England" (1986)	"Little Rock" (1986)

"Whoever's in New England" is a song written by Kendal Franceschi and Quentin Powers, and recorded by American country music singer Reba McEntire. It was released in March 1986 as the first single from the eponymous album. The song is considered one of McEntire's signature songs and breakthrough singles.

== Composition and legacy ==
The song was written in the voice of a Southern woman who believes her husband is having an affair during his business trips to Boston (the video clearly shows him having at least an emotional affair with a co-worker), but tells him she will stay with him. The story is further told in the music video, when by the end of the song, her husband regrets his decision and decides to stay. The song's composition and production were inspired in part by Barry Manilow's 1976 song "Weekend in New England". In turn, the 2007 Sugarland hit "Stay" was inspired by "Whoever's in New England", and tells the story from the perspective of the mistress.

It was a career-making song for McEntire, not least because it was promoted by her first music video. Reaching number one in May 1986, it marked a major breakthrough for her. "Little Rock", the follow-up single, also hit number one, as did the Whoever's in New England album, her first album to be certified platinum.

In 1987, McEntire won the Grammy Award for Best Female Country Vocal Performance for "Whoever's in New England", her first Grammy. Also thanks in part to the success of the song, McEntire won a number of awards from the Country Music Association and Academy of Country Music.

== Cover versions ==
Country music singer Martina McBride covered the song from the television special CMT Giants: Reba

== Music video ==
"Whoever's in New England" was McEntire's first music video and was directed and produced by Schock/Small. It was filmed in Boston, and featured footage of Boston Public Garden, Trinity Church, and the John Hancock Tower. It begins with a shot of a packed suitcase, before revealing Reba singing the opening lines while staring out the window of her house. It is implied that she is married, and her husband is set to go on a required business trip. He, all of a sudden, reflects on his relationship with another woman, a co-worker of his. As Reba finishes the first chorus, her husband confronts her. She starts the second verse while in the car on the way to the airport, while more memories of the man and his other girlfriend playing in the snow are then seen. At the airport, the man is almost ready to go on his flight, but stops short when Reba confronts him. He leaves her at first, but all of a sudden, drops his suitcase and goes back to embrace Reba as others are heading to their gates.

== Chart positions ==
Chart (1986)	Peak position
US Hot Country Songs (Billboard)	1
Canadian RPM Country Tracks	3
