= Why Haven't I Heard from You =

Single by Reba McEntire

from the album Read My Mind
- B-side: "If I Had Only Known"
- Released: March 21, 1994
- Genre: Rock; country
- Length: 3:27
- Label: MCA 54823
- Songwriters: Sandy Knox; T. W. Hale
- Producers: Tony Brown; Reba McEntire

Reba McEntire singles chronology
"They Asked About You" (1993)	"Why Haven't I Heard from You" (1994)	"She Thinks His Name Was John" (1994)

Music video
- "Why Haven't I Heard from You" on YouTube

"Why Haven't I Heard from You" is a song written by Sandy Knox and T. W. Hale, and recorded by American country music artist Reba McEntire. It was released on March 21, 1994, by MCA Records as the first single from her nineteenth album, Read My Mind (1994). The song was produced by McEntire with Tony Brown, and reached number five on the US Billboard Hot Country Singles & Tracks chart in July 1994. It debuted at number 60 on the chart for the week of April 9, 1994.

== Critical reception ==
Larry Flick from Billboard magazine wrote, "On this first single from her forthcoming album, Reba returns successfully to her sassy 'Take It Back' mode. A full-blown horn section and a giant gospel choir are not-so-gentle reminders that she's expanded her boundaries way beyond traditional country." Pan-European magazine Music & Media named it a "gospel-framed" single and a "happy-go-lucky rocker", "destined for the A1 button on many jukeboxes."

== Music video ==
The accompanying music video for "Why Haven't I Heard from You" was directed by Jon Small and premiered on CMT on March 23, 1994, as their "Hot Shot Video of the Week". It starts with Reba and her co-star boyfriend in a restaurant with a mariachi band playing in the background. The boyfriend asks her to “go away together,” and, after a ponderous think about it, she says “YES!!!” The boyfriend then says “I’ll call you at the Hollywood Parlor, at 7.” The word “7” echos as the main set is revealed (a beauty parlor) and the song begins.

Reba is then shown with 4 other women trying on various disguises, getting her nails and face done, and performing. Reba waits impatiently by the parlor’s phone for her boyfriend’s call. During the final chorus, Reba and 4 women are seen in black and white outfits and top hats as they sing on a grand stage. It then goes back to the restaurant, where Reba is seen initially dozing, but after her boyfriend says her character’s name, she confronts him, saying “You didn’t even call! How dare you leave me in that beauty shop all day!” The video ends as the mariachi band finishes their performance. The video set was built in such a way that the restaurant set was actually built directly in front of the main salon set. It took two days to film.

== Charts ==
=== Weekly charts ===
Chart (1994)	Peak position
Canada Country Singles (RPM)	4
US Bubbling Under Hot 100 (Billboard)	1
US Hot Country Songs (Billboard)	5

=== Year-end charts ===
Chart (1994)	Position
Canada Country Tracks (RPM)	60
US Country Songs (Billboard)	43
