= You Lie (Cee Cee Chapman song) =

Song by Cee Cee Chapman

from the album Twist of Fate
- Released: 1988
- Genre: Country
- Length: 3:50
- Label: Curb
- Composers: Bobby Fischer; Austin Roberts; Charlie Black
- Producers: Bobby Fischer; Austin Roberts; Charlie Black

"You Lie"

Single by Reba McEntire

from the album Rumor Has It
- B-side: "That's All She Wrote"
- Released: August 25, 1990
- Recorded: April 1990
- Genre: Country
- Length: 3:59
- Label: MCA
- Songwriters: Bobby Fischer; Austin Roberts; Charlie Black
- Producers: Tony Brown; Reba McEntire

Reba McEntire singles chronology
"Walk On" (1990)	"You Lie" (1990)	"Rumor Has It" (1990)

"You Lie" is a song written by Bobby Fischer, Charlie Black and Austin Roberts. It was originally recorded by American country music artist Cee Cee Chapman for her 1988 debut album Twist of Fate. The best-known version of the song was recorded by Reba McEntire who released it in August 1990 as the first single from her seventeenth album Rumor Has It. The song became McEntire's fourteenth number one country hit. It stayed at the top-spot for one week in late 1990 and spent a total of 20 weeks on the country chart.

== Content ==
The narrator knows her husband no longer loves her, and is agonizing over whether to play along to keep him close (knowing he is only staying out of obligation), or to do the right thing and let him go.

== Cover versions ==
Country music singer Faith Hill covered the song from the television special CMT Giants: Reba

== Music video ==
Directed by Peter Israelson and filmed entirely in black-and-white, the video features Reba as the wife of a ranch owner, distraught as her marriage is collapsing while her husband spends most of his time taming a wild horse. After an argument with Reba, the husband packs his bags and leaves her, forcing her to tend to the ranch herself. Now liberated, Reba goes on one last ride with the tamed horse. She then releases it from its corral and the video ends with Reba cheering as the horse runs gracefully into the tall grass.

== Chart performance ==
Chart (1990)	Peak position
Canada Country Singles (RPM)	1
US Hot Country Songs (Billboard)	1

=== Year-end charts ===
Chart (1990)	Position
Canada Country Tracks (RPM)	15
US Country Songs (Billboard)	57
