= Till You Love Me =

Single by Reba McEntire

from the album Read My Mind
- B-side: "I Wouldn't Wanna Be You"
- Released: October 25, 1994
- Genre: Country
- Length: 3:50
- Label: MCA 54888
- Songwriters: Bob DiPiero; Gary Burr
- Producers: Tony Brown; Reba McEntire

Reba McEntire singles chronology
"She Thinks His Name Was John" (1994)	"Till You Love Me" (1994)	"The Heart Is a Lonely Hunter" (1995)

Music video
- "Till You Love Me" on YouTube

"Till You Love Me" is a song written by Bob DiPiero and Gary Burr, and recorded by American country music artist Reba McEntire. It was released in October 1994 by MCA Records as the third single from her nineteenth studio album, Read My Mind (1994). The song reached number two on the US Billboard Hot Country Singles & Tracks chart in February 1995, behind Pam Tillis' "Mi Vida Loca (My Crazy Life)". It was also McEntire's first entry on the Billboard Hot 100, reaching number 78.

== Critical reception ==
Larry Flick from Billboard magazine wrote, "Between movies and Frito endorsements, Reba's career is heading in more than a few directions these days. Her performance on this big, 3/4-time love ballad helps to remind us that, in the middle of it all, she is still one hell of a singer."

== Music video ==
The accompanying music video for "Till You Love Me" was directed by Jon Small, and premiered in late 1994. It is a live performance, filmed at the Omaha Civic Center in Omaha, Nebraska, which was taken from the 1994 NBC special Reba: Live!. The performance shows Reba performing the song in a light pink dress with her band.

== Charts ==
=== Weekly charts ===
Chart (1994–1995)	Peak position
Canada Country Singles (RPM)	8
US Billboard Hot 100	78
US Hot Country Songs (Billboard)	2

=== Year-end charts ===
Chart (1995)	Position
US Hot Country Songs (Billboard)	40
