= Whoever's in New England =

Studio album by Reba McEntire
- Released: February 10, 1986
- Recorded: October–November 1985
- Studios: Sound Stage Studios (Nashville, Tennessee)
- Genre: Country
- Length: 31:43
- Label: MCA
- Producers: Jimmy Bowen; Reba McEntire

Reba McEntire chronology
Reba Nell McEntire (1986)	Whoever's in New England (1986)	What Am I Gonna Do About You (1986)

Singles from Whoever's in New England
- 1. "Whoever's in New England" Released: January 27, 1986; 2. "Little Rock" Released: June 2, 1986

Professional ratings
Review scores
Source	Rating
Allmusic	4.5/5 stars

Whoever's in New England is the tenth studio album of American country music artist Reba McEntire released on February 10, 1986, through MCA Nashville. It is her first #1 album on the Billboard country albums chart, producing two singles that were #1 country hits: "Whoever's in New England" and "Little Rock".

The album's phenomenal success proved to be a turning point in McEntire's career. It was the singer's first platinum record, and solidified her new superstardom when she was named the 'Entertainer of the Year' by the Country Music Association in autumn 1986.

The album also marked another milestone, McEntire made her first music video for the title track. Eventually, McEntire would become known for her 'mini-movie'-styled music videos.

"I've Seen Better Days" was originally recorded as a duet by George Jones & Tammy Wynette on their 1976 album, Golden Ring.

== Promotion ==
=== Singles ===
The title track "Whoever's in New England" served as the album's lead single and was released on January 27, 1986. It reached number 1 on the Billboard Hot Country Songs Chart. "Whoever's in New England" was McEntire's first music video, is considered as one of her signature and breakthrough singles, and she won her first Grammy for it.

"Little Rock" was released as the second single on June 2, 1986. It peaked at number 1 the Billboard Hot Country Songs Chart.

== Track listing ==
No.	Title	Writer(s)	Length
1.	"Can't Stop Now"	Gary Nicholson; Wendy Waldman	2:52
2.	"You Can Take the Wings Off Me"	Troy Seals; Eddie Setser	3:36
3.	"Whoever's in New England"	Kendal Franceschi; Quentin Powers	3:21
4.	"I'll Believe It When I Feel It"	Chris Waters; Tom Shapiro; Bucky Jones	2:38
5.	"I've Seen Better Days"	Red Lane; Danny Morrison	3:46
6.	"Little Rock"	Pat McManus; Bob DiPiero; Gerry House	3:07
7.	"If You Only Knew"	Diana Rae; Jane Mariash	3:03
8.	"One Thin Dime"	Jackson Leap; Michael P. Heeney	2:31
9.	"Don't Touch Me There"	Heeney	3:14
10.	"To Make That Same Mistake Again"	Roger Murrah; Richard Leigh	2:24

== Personnel ==
Vocals

- Reba McEntire – lead vocals, backing vocals
- Pake McEntire – backing vocals
- Karen Staley – backing vocals

Musicians

- John Hobbs – acoustic piano
- Leigh Reynolds – acoustic guitar
- Billy Joe Walker Jr. – acoustic guitar, electric guitar
- Reggie Young – electric guitar
- Weldon Myrick – steel guitar
- David Hungate – bass
- Matt Betton – drums
- Randy "Snuffy" Elmore – fiddle
- Johnny Gimble – fiddle

=== Production ===
- Jimmy Bowen – producer
- Reba McEntire – producer
- Ron Treat – recording engineer
- Bob Bullock – overdub recording
- Chip Hardy – overdub recording
- Chuck Ainlay – mixing at The Castle (Franklin, Tennessee)
- Mark J. Coddington – second engineer
- Russ Martin – second engineer
- Keith Odle – second engineer
- Robbie Rose – second engineer
- Glenn Meadows – mastering at Masterfonics (Nashville, Tennessee)
- Camille Brown – design
- Simon Levy – art direction
- Jim "Señor" McGuire – photography
- Mary Beth Felts – hair, make-up
- Ann Payne – stylist

== Charts ==
=== Weekly charts ===
Chart (1986)	Peak position
US Top Country Albums (Billboard)	1

=== Year-end charts ===
Chart (1986)	Position
US Top Country Albums (Billboard)	8

=== Singles ===
Year	Single	Peak positions	
Year	Single	US Country	CAN Country
1986	"Whoever's in New England"	1	3
1986	"Little Rock"	1	2

== Certifications and sales ==
Region	Certification	Certified units/sales
United States (RIAA)	Platinum	1,000,000^{^}
^{^} Shipments figures based on certification alone.
