= It's Your Call (song) =

Single by Reba McEntire

from the album It's Your Call
- B-side: "For Herself"
- Released: May 18, 1993
- Genre: Country
- Length: 3:04
- Label: MCA 54696
- Songwriters: Bruce Burch; Shawna Harrington-Burkhart; Liz Hengber
- Producers: Tony Brown; Reba McEntire

Reba McEntire singles chronology
"The Heart Won't Lie" (1993)	"It's Your Call" (1993)	"Does He Love You" (1993)

Music video
- "It's Your Call" on YouTube

"It's Your Call" is a song written by Liz Hengber, Bruce Burch and Shawna Harrington-Burkhart, and recorded by American country music artist Reba McEntire. It was released in May 1993 by MCA Records as the third and final single and title track from her eighteenth studio album, It's Your Call (1992). The song reached number five on the US Billboard Hot Country Singles & Tracks chart in July 1993.

== Music video ==
The video for this song was directed by Jon Small. Compared to many other of Reba's videos of the time, the video for this song is very simple, showing Reba performing the song under many blue strobe lights.

== Charts ==
=== Weekly charts ===
Chart (1993)	Peak position
Canada Country Singles (RPM)	5
US Bubbling Under Hot 100 (Billboard)	10
US Hot Country Songs (Billboard)	5

=== Year-end charts ===
Chart (1993)	Position
Canada Country Tracks (RPM)	58
US Country Songs (Billboard)	42
