= The Heart Is a Lonely Hunter (song) =

Single by Reba McEntire

from the album Read My Mind
- B-side: "Read My Mind"
- Released: February 18, 1995
- Genre: Country
- Length: 3:50
- Label: MCA Nashville
- Songwriters: Mark D. Sanders; Kim Williams; Ed Hill
- Producer: Tony Brown

Reba McEntire singles chronology
"Till You Love Me" (1994)	"The Heart Is a Lonely Hunter" (1995)	"And Still" (1995)

Music video
- "The Heart Is a Lonely Hunter" (audio) on YouTube

"The Heart Is a Lonely Hunter" is a song written by Mark D. Sanders, Kim Williams and Ed Hill, and recorded by American country music artist Reba McEntire. It was released in February 1995 by MCA Nashville as the fourth single from her nineteenth studio album, Read My Mind (1994). The song reached number one on both the US and Canadian country singles charts that year.

The song debuted at No. 58 for the week of February 18, 1995, and peaked at No. 1 for the week of April 15, 1995.

== Charts ==
=== Weekly charts ===
Chart (1995)	Peak position
Canada Country Singles (RPM)	1
US Hot Country Songs (Billboard)	1

=== Year-end charts ===
Chart (1995)	Position
Canada Country Tracks (RPM)	38
US Country Songs (Billboard)	21
