= The Greatest Man I Never Knew =

Single by Reba McEntire

from the album For My Broken Heart
- B-side: "If I Had Only Known"
- Released: July 1992
- Genre: Country
- Length: 3:14
- Label: MCA 54441
- Songwriters: Richard Leigh; Layng Martine Jr.
- Producers: Tony Brown; Reba McEntire

Reba McEntire singles chronology
"The Night the Lights Went Out in Georgia" (1992)	"The Greatest Man I Never Knew" (1992)	"Take It Back" (1992)

"The Greatest Man I Never Knew" is a song written by Richard Leigh and Layng Martine Jr., and recorded by American country music artist Reba McEntire. It released in July 1992 as the fourth and final single from her album For My Broken Heart. The song reached No. 3 on the Billboard Hot Country Singles & Tracks chart in October 1992.

== Content ==
Richard Leigh has described the song as being about his own father and that several other of his hit songs were also from his own life ("I'll Get Over You" and "Don't It Make My Brown Eyes Blue").

== Chart performance ==
Chart (1992)	Peak position
Canada Country Singles (RPM)	1
US Hot Country Songs (Billboard)	3

=== Year-end charts ===
Chart (1992)	Position
Canada Country Tracks (RPM)	22
US Country Songs (Billboard)	70
