= Rumor Has It (Reba McEntire song) =

Single by Reba McEntire

from the album Rumor Has It
- B-side: "You Remember Me"
- Released: November 26, 1990
- Genre: Country
- Length: 3:48
- Label: MCA
- Songwriters: Bruce Burch; Vern Dant; Larry Shell
- Producers: Tony Brown; Reba McEntire

Reba McEntire singles chronology
"You Lie" (1990)	"Rumor Has It" (1990)	"Fancy" (1991)

"Rumor Has It" is a song written by Bruce Burch, Vern Dant and Larry Shell, and recorded by American country music artist Reba McEntire. It was released on November 5, 1990, as the second single and title track from her album Rumor Has It (1990). The song reached number 3 on the Billboard Hot Country Singles & Tracks chart in February 1991.

== Music video ==
The music video was Reba's first of her career to be directed by Jack Cole (who would go on to direct many of her classic early 1990s videos) and premiered in early 1991. It depicts Reba performing the song in a smoky, deserted warehouse.

== Chart performance ==
The song debuted at number 42 on the Hot Country Singles & Tracks for the week of December 1, 1990.

Chart (1990–1991)	Peak position
Canada Country Singles (RPM)	1
US Hot Country Songs (Billboard)	3

=== Year-end charts ===
Chart (1991)	Position
Canada Country Tracks (RPM)	5
US Country Songs (Billboard)	17
