= Little Rock (Reba McEntire song) =

Single by Reba McEntire

from the album Whoever's in New England
- B-side: "If You Only Knew"
- Released: June 2, 1986
- Genre: Country
- Length: 3:07
- Label: MCA
- Songwriters: Pat McManus; Bob DiPiero; Gerry House
- Producers: Jimmy Bowen; Reba McEntire

Reba McEntire singles chronology
"Whoever's in New England" (1986)	"Little Rock" (1986)	"What Am I Gonna Do About You" (1986)

"Little Rock" is a song written by Pat McManus, Bob DiPiero and Gerry House, and recorded by American country music artist Reba McEntire. It released in June 1986 as the second single from the album Whoever's in New England. The song reached number one on the Billboard Hot Country Singles & Tracks chart in late 1986.

== Background ==
"Little Rock" was recorded at the MCA studio in Nashville, Tennessee. The song itself is not to be confused with either the capital of Arkansas or the Collin Raye song, both of which have the same name.

== Content ==
The song is about a woman who marries a wealthy man and is at first enamored at the prospect of living a wealthy lifestyle and "having all the finer things". But she soon grows tired of not being truly loved by her husband. The song's chorus further describes its storyline:

Oh little rock, think I'm gonna have to slip you off
Take a chance tonight and untie the knot
There's more to life than what I got
Oh little rock you know this heart of mine just can't be bought
I'm gonna find someone who really cares a lot, when I slip off this little rock

== Critical reception ==
"Little Rock" was reviewed mainly positively. William Ruhlmann of Allmusic reviewed the album, Whoever's in New England, calling the song a "cheery cheating song." About.com's Jolene Downs also reviewed McEntire's 1986 album and gave "Little Rock," praise, calling it one of the "pros" of the album, along with the songs, "Whoever's in New England" and "Can't Stop Now." Downs also said that the song was "of my favorites," praising McEntire's voice on the track (among a few others mentioned), further stating, "She can sing a love ballad with enough feeling to bring tears to your eyes. She can dish out the ultimatums to the "other woman" like no one else."

== Release and chart performance ==
"Little Rock" was released as the second single from Whoever's in New England on June 2, 1986, following the success of the title track. "Little Rock" became McEntire's sixth number one single on the Billboard Hot Country Singles & Tracks chart and was the last single released from the album. In addition, the song also reached #2 in on Canada's RPM Country Tracks chart, becoming her highest-charting single in Canada up to that point. With the single's success the album became McEntire's first album to certify "Gold" by the Recording Industry Association of America, and eventually went "Platinum."

== Charts ==
Chart (1986)	Peak position
US Hot Country Songs (Billboard)	1
Canadian RPM Country Tracks	2
