= And Still (Reba McEntire song) =

Single by Reba McEntire

from the album Read My Mind
- B-side: "I Won't Stand in Line"
- Released: May 27, 1995
- Genre: Country
- Length: 3:27
- Label: MCA 55047
- Songwriters: Liz Hengber; Tommy Lee James
- Producers: Tony Brown; Reba McEntire

Reba McEntire singles chronology
"The Heart Is a Lonely Hunter" (1995)	"And Still" (1995)	"On My Own" (1995)

Music video
- "And Still" on YouTube

"And Still" is a song written by Liz Hengber and Tommy Lee James, and recorded by American country music artist Reba McEntire. It was released in May 1995 by MCA Records as the fifth and final single from her nineteenth studio album, Read My Mind (1994). The song reached number two on the US Billboard Hot Country Singles & Tracks chart in August 1995.

It debuted at number 58 on the Hot Country Singles chart for the week of May 27, 1995, and peaked at number 2 for the week of August 5, 1995, behind Alan Jackson's "I Don't Even Know Your Name".

== Music video ==
The music video for "And Still" was released in July 1995, and was Reba's final video to be directed by Jack Cole (who directed some of Reba's most memorable '90s videos). It was filmed over 3 days in Guatemala City, Guatemala. Then-Guiding Light actors Mark Derwin and Beth Ehlers appear in the video.

=== Synopsis ===
The video starts with an image of a city tour bus, with a subtitle reading "Somewhere in Central America". Reba is then shown as a passenger on the bus, and while the bus tours through a village, she spots a man on the streets. She instantly recognizes him as her past love that she never got over. She and the man enjoy time together, reminiscing about the past. While dining together at a restaurant, his wife and son show up. Reba puts on a brave face, while secretly she is heartbroken. She then climbs a set of stairs to a temple and sighs in disbelief while a bonfire is taking place below her. Finally, it shows the man and his wife in a plane flying away; the woman puts her hand in her husband's hand as three natives and Reba watch before walking away. Scenes also feature Reba performing the song beside a piano in a classroom full of children, as well as flashbacks of her and the man (shown in blue-grey tone). During the first chorus, one child replies "The Doctor!...The Doctor is Coming" from the back of a truck in Spanish (hence the use of a subtitle during that scene.)

== Charts ==
=== Weekly charts ===
Weekly chart performance for "And Still"
Chart (1995)	Peak position
Canada Country Singles (RPM)	1
US Hot Country Songs (Billboard)	2

=== Year-end charts ===
Year-end chart performance for "And Still"
Chart (1995)	Position
Canada Country Tracks (RPM)	27
US Country Songs (Billboard)	24
