= The Heart Won't Lie =

Single by Reba McEntire with Vince Gill

from the album It's Your Call
- B-side: "Will He Ever Go Away" (Reba McEntire only)
- Released: February 15, 1993
- Recorded: 1992
- Genre: Country
- Length: 3:20
- Label: MCA
- Songwriters: Kim Carnes, Donna Weiss
- Producers: Tony Brown, Reba McEntire

Reba McEntire singles chronology
"Take It Back" (1992)	"The Heart Won't Lie" (1993)	"It's Your Call" (1993)

Vince Gill singles chronology
"Don't Let Our Love Start Slippin' Away" (1992)	"The Heart Won't Lie" (1993)	"No Future in the Past" (1993)

"The Heart Won't Lie" is a song written by Kim Carnes and Donna Weiss, and recorded as a duet between American country music artists Reba McEntire and Vince Gill. It was released in February 1993 as the second single from Reba's album It's Your Call. The song reached the top of the Billboard Hot Country Singles & Tracks (now Hot Country Songs) chart.

"The Heart Won't Lie" as told by Reba: "Originally Kenny Rogers and I were looking at doing this song as a duet but we could never get it to sound just right because of the different ranges of our voices. Unfortunately, it just didn't work out. Later when I was working on a new CD, I remembered that song and called Kenny to see if he was recording it and if not, could I have it and he passed it along to me. We asked Vince Gill to sing the background harmonies on the song. Tony Brown, who was co-producing the CD with me, suggested letting Vince do more than just sing harmony on the song, so he took a couple of verses, and we decided to turn it into a duet.

"It worked out well in the end for everyone - except, I think, Vince. He doesn't really care for videos and this one turned into a four-day shoot. It was great to spend time with Vince and get to watch him do what he called his Gomer Pyle imitation for his character. But I had to promise him that if he ever does another song with me, he will never have to suffer through a four-day video shoot again!"

The two performed the song on the 1992 Academy of Country Music Awards.

Reba and Vince performed the song on the TV series Evening Shade playing themselves in the episode "Ava Takes A Shower."

== Music video ==
The music video was directed by Jon Small and premiered in early 1993. It features Reba as a United States Navy Officer Candidate, and Vince as a United States Marine Corps Drill Instructor (which is a homage of the Navy Officer Candidate School scene from An Officer and a Gentleman where Gill does the part similar to the one performed by Louis Gossett Jr. - Reba's role was a homage to the Richard Gere part), as well as Reba's love interest. It was filmed, over 4 days at the Nashville Armed Forces Recruiting Station, and in China. It starts with Reba's Navy team giving a cheer, and then Reba appears, in full uniform, to perform the song. Scenes during her verse and chorus also see her going through rigorous training, with Vince as her Class Drill Instructor. Each time she faces difficulty in a task, Vince guides her to complete it. One scene also shows Vince comforting her during a fire test, with her covered in smoke.

During Vince's verse, he is about to board a plane in full uniform while singing. Scenes during this verse show Reba & Gill in memories hanging out and having a good time on a beach and in front of a pagoda.

When the final chorus hits, Vince and Reba are seen singing to each other in front of a glass panel. They each touch their side of the panel, and then Vince puts his cap on, and after giving each other a final salute, they both part to join their respective stations.

== Chart performance ==
The song debuted at number 51 on the Hot Country Singles & Tracks chart dated February 20, 1993. It charted for 20 weeks on that chart, and reached Number One on the chart dated April 10, 1993, where it stayed for two weeks. It was McEntire's seventeenth Number One single, and Gill's third Number One.

=== Charts ===
Chart (1993)	Peak position
Canada Country Singles (RPM)	1
US Hot Country Songs (Billboard)	1

=== Year-end charts ===
Chart (1993)	Position
Canada Country Tracks (RPM)	44
US Country Songs (Billboard)	34

== Certifications ==
Region	Certification	Certified units/sales
United States (RIAA)	Gold	500,000^{‡}
^{‡} Sales+streaming figures based on certification alone.
