= Forever Love (Reba McEntire song) =

Single by Reba McEntire

from the album If You See Him
- B-side: "All This Time"
- Released: July 13, 1998
- Genre: Country
- Length: 3:53
- Label: MCA Nashville 72062
- Songwriters: Liz Hengber; Deanna Bryant; Sunny Russ
- Producers: David Malloy; Reba McEntire

Reba McEntire singles chronology
"If You See Him/If You See Her" (1998)	"Forever Love" (1998)	"Wrong Night" (1998)

"Forever Love" is a song by American country music artist Reba McEntire from her 22nd studio album, If You See Him (1998). It was written by Liz Hengber, Deanna Bryant and Sunny Russ and produced by McEntire and David Malloy. It was released on July 13, 1998, as the second single from the album.

The song reached number four on the US Billboard Hot Country Singles & Tracks chart in November 1998. It was also the title song to a made-for-television movie Forever Love which aired the same year, starring McEntire and Tim Matheson.

== Critical reception ==
Deborah Evans Price of Billboard gave the song a mixed review, praising the "sentimental lyric" and "pretty melody" while criticizing the "overly lush pop production". She also criticized McEntire's vocal by saying that it "bounces between being appropriately vulnerable and intimate during the verses to going a little too far on the soaring chorus."

== Music video ==
The music video for the song was directed by Gerry Wenner, and was filmed to coincide with the movie's release. It is the only solo video released from Reba's If You See Him record. Filmed in Pasadena, California over one day, it shows footage from the movie, interspersed with scenes of Reba performing the song in a garden. The video premiered to CMT on August 2, 1998.

== Commercial performance ==
"Forever Love" debuted on the US Billboard Hot Country Songs chart the week of July 25, 1998 at number 55, becoming the "Hot Shot Debut" of the week. It would peak at number 4 on November 14, 1998. On Radio & Records, the track would reach the top for the week of October 30, 1998.

== Charts ==
=== Weekly charts ===
Chart (1998)	Peak position
Canada Country Singles (RPM)	4
US Hot Country Songs (Billboard)	4

=== Year-end charts ===
Chart (1998)	Position
Canada Country Tracks (RPM)	41
US Country Songs (Billboard)	41
