= Is There Life Out There =

Single by Reba McEntire

from the album For My Broken Heart
- B-side: "Buying Her Roses"
- Released: January 28, 1992
- Recorded: 1991
- Genre: Country
- Length: 3:52 (album version); 3:11 (single version)
- Label: MCA Nashville
- Songwriters: Susan Longacre; Rick Giles
- Producers: Tony Brown; Reba McEntire

Reba McEntire singles chronology
"For My Broken Heart" (1991)	"Is There Life Out There" (1992)	"The Night the Lights Went Out in Georgia" (1992)

"Is There Life Out There" is a song written by Susan Longacre and Rick Giles, and recorded by American country music singer Reba McEntire. It was released on January 28, 1992, as the second single from her album For My Broken Heart. The song reached Number One on the American country singles charts in March of that year, and peaked at the same position on the Canadian country singles charts in April.

The song debuted at #64 on the Hot Country Singles & Tracks and peaked at #1 for the week of March 28, 1992 (McEntire's 37th birthday), and it stayed at #1 for two consecutive weeks.

== Content ==
"Is There Life Out There" is a mid-tempo song, telling of a female protagonist who married at age twenty. She finds herself wanting to make a better life for herself outside of her family, asking herself "is there life out there."

The song's radio edit omits one repetition of the chorus at the end.

== Cover versions ==
Country music singer Wynonna Judd covered the song from the television special CMT Giants: Reba

== Music video ==
The song's music video was directed by Jack Cole and featured Huey Lewis as McEntire's character's husband. This video is noted for being one of the first in country music to include significant amounts of dialogue that portray the song's storyline. Portions of the video were shot on Belmont University's campus in Nashville, TN. According to Entertainment Weekly, McEntire and her label (MCA Records) received complaints from the television network CMT over the video that she was "putting message ahead of music", and it was almost banned from the network. The video won Video of the Year at the 1992 Academy of Country Music awards.

The video depicts a woman named Maggie O'Connor (McEntire) juggling a career (as a waitress at a local diner), courses at the local college and a family life. Her husband, Andy (Lewis) keeps things under control at home as life becomes hectic for Maggie: the couple's daughter is sent home from school with an illness, the couple's son is in a school play, and Maggie—whose job at the busy diner always makes her run behind—irritates her hard-nosed literary professor by her frequent tardiness. However, Maggie is able to find time to bond with her daughter, and eventually wins over the professor with her thought process. Unfortunately, the stresses of pursuing her degree nearly gets to Maggie when she yells at her daughter for inadvertently spilling coffee on her term paper. Andy intervenes and, while Maggie apologizes to her daughter, he dries off the pages. In the end, Maggie gets an A on her term paper and graduates with honors. Andy proudly tells everyone, "That's my wife."

McEntire starred in a 1994 television movie on CBS, also titled Is There Life Out There?, which was based on the song's storyline.

== Chart performance ==
"Is There Life Out There" reached Number One on both the U.S. Billboard Hot Country Singles & Tracks (now Hot Country Songs) charts and the Canadian RPM Country Tracks charts. It held the position for two weeks in the U.S., and one in Canada.

=== Charts ===
Chart (1992)	Peak position
Canada Country Singles (RPM)	1
US Hot Country Songs (Billboard)	1

=== Year-end charts ===
Chart (1992)	Position
Canada Country Tracks (RPM)	7
US Country Songs (Billboard)	3

== Certifications ==
Region	Certification	Certified units/sales
United States (RIAA)	Gold	500,000^{‡}
^{‡} Sales+streaming figures based on certification alone.
