= Liz Hengber =

- Born: August 22, 1959 (age 67); Brooklyn, New York, U.S.
- Genre: Country
- Occupations: Songwriter, musician
- Instruments: Vocals guitar
- Years active: 1986–present

Elizabeth M. Hengber (born August 22, 1959) is an American songwriter and musician based in Nashville, Tennessee.

== Early life and education ==
Hengber was born in Brooklyn, New York, and graduated from New Milford High School in New Milford, New Jersey in 1977. She graduated from the Theatre Department of the C.W. Post Campus of Long Island University in 1981. Hengber began her song-writing career after moving to Nashville, where she initially worked at the Bluebird Cafe as a waitress.

In 1991, Hengber signed with Reba McEntire's company Starstruck Entertainment as a songwriter. Within six months, she had her first hit "For My Broken Heart" (1991), which held the number one position on the Billboard Hot Country Singles & Tracks Chart for two weeks in December 1991. She composed three additional top-five country hits (Billboard) for McEntire – "It's Your Call" (1993), "And Still" (1995), and "Forever Love" (1998).

She has co-written charting singles for a variety of other artists including Rick Trevino's "Looking for the Light" (1995), Lisa Brokop's "She Can't Save Him" (1996), Peter Cetera's "Do You Love Me That Much" (1997), Andy Griggs' "She's More" (2000), Clay Davidson's "Unconditional" (2000), Trick Pony's "The Bride" (2005), and Bucky Covington's "A Father's Love (The Only Way He Knew How)" (2010).

== Songs co-written by Liz Hengber ==
Singles written or co-written by Liz Hengber include the following.

- "Just Like Them Horses" by Reba McEntire
- "For My Broken Heart" by Reba McEntire
- "Damn Drunk" by Ronnie Dunn
- "She Can't Save Him" by Trisha Yearwood & Reba McEntire
- "Here The Willow" Cry by The Steeldrivers
- "The Stubborn One" by Trace Adkins
- "A lot to learn about living" by Easton Corbin
- "And Still" by Reba McEntire
- "It's Your Call" by Reba McEntire
- "Forever Love" by Reba McEntire
- "She's More" by Andy Griggs
- "Unconditional" by Clay Davidson
- "Do You Love Me That Much" by Peter Cetera
- "The Bride" by Trick Pony
- "The Chance" by Julie Roberts
- "The Power of One" by Bomshel
- "Looking for the Light" by Rick Trevino
- "Giants" by Tamara Walker
- "Before He Kissed Me" by Lisa Brokop
- "She Can't Save Him" by Lisa Brokop
- "For You" by James Otto
- "Seven Vern Gosdins Ago" by Darren Kozelsky
- "A Father's Love (The Only Way He Knew How)" by Bucky Covington (also recorded by High Valley)
- "Ain't My Day To Save the World" by Hoyt Hughes
