= List of awards and nominations received by Reba McEntire =

Reba McEntire awards and nominations
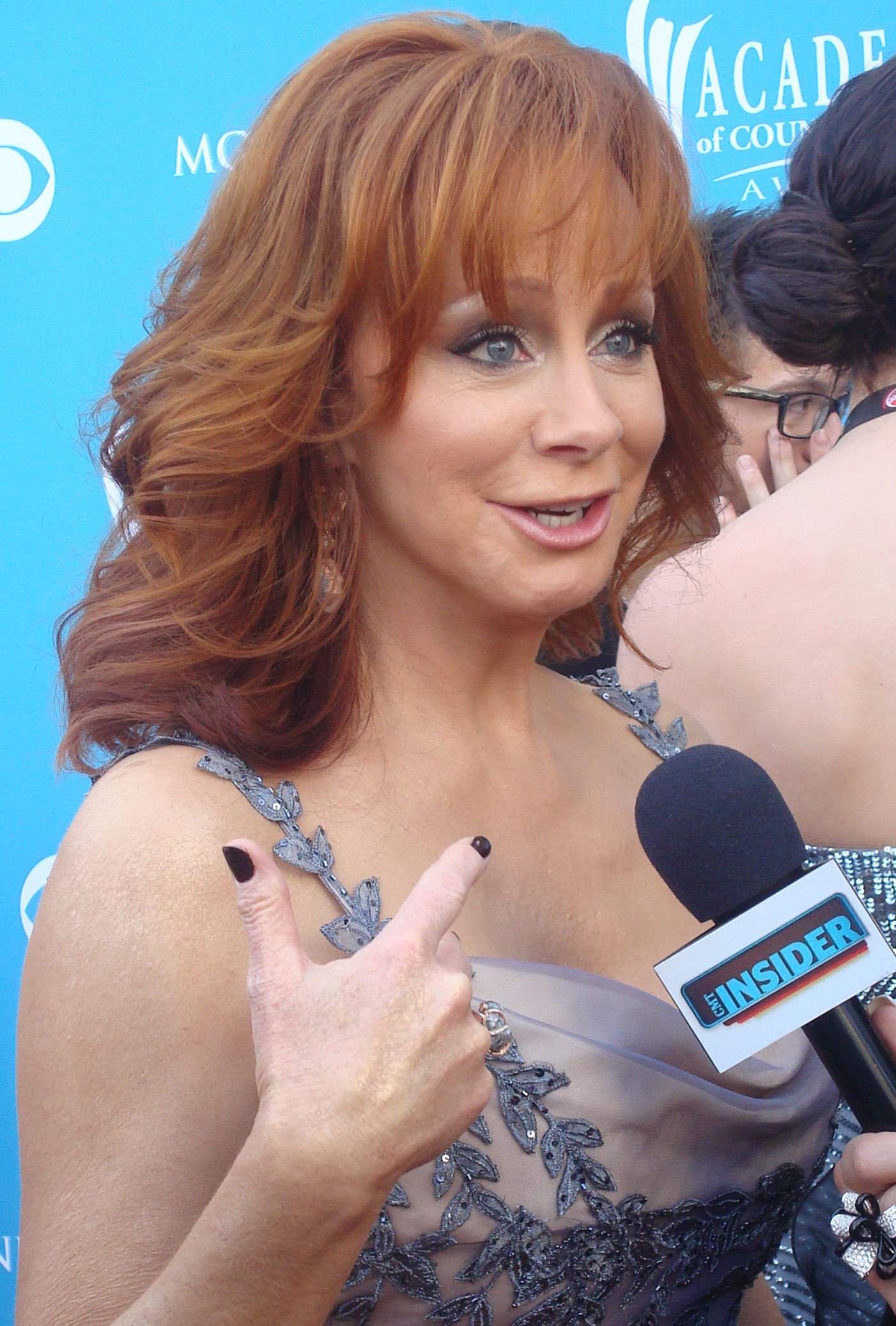
- McEntire at the 45th Annual Academy of Country Music Awards
Awards and nominations
Award	Wins	Nominations
American Music Awards	14	23
CMT	0	10
Golden Globe	0	1
Grammy	3	16
People's Choice	9	13
Academy of Country Music Awards	16	48
Country Music Association Awards	7	50

Totals (Note: Certain award groups do not simply award one winner. They acknowledge several different recipients, have runners-up, and have third place. Since this is a specific recognition and is different from losing an award, runner-up mentions are considered wins in this award tally. For simplification and to avoid errors, each award in this list has been presumed to have had a prior nomination.)
- Wins: 91
- Nominations: 221

This is a list of major music awards received by Reba McEntire, an American country music singer, who is often referred to as "The Queen of Country Music". A three-time Grammy Award winner, she also holds several awards from the Academy of Country Music and Country Music Association, the two major country music award associations. McEntire has been recognized with numerous awards since 1984, amassing a total of 85 awards.

== American Country Awards ==
Fox broadcast the American Country Awards from 2010 to 2013, the award show was fan-voted, and McEntire garnered 6 nominations.

Year	Nominee / work	Award	Result
2010	Herself	Female Artist of the Year	Nominated
2010	"Consider Me Gone"	Single by a Female Artist	Nominated
2010	"Consider Me Gone"	Music Video by a Female Artist	Nominated
2010	Herself (with George Strait)	Touring Artist of the Year	Nominated
2011	"Turn On The Radio"	Single of the Year: Female	Nominated
2011	"Turn On The Radio"	Music Video: Female	Nominated

== Academy of Country Music Awards ==
The Academy of Country Music Awards is an annual country music awards show, established in 1964. Reba has won 14 regular ACM awards and 5 ACM Special Achievement awards for a total of 19 ACM Awards. Reba holds the 2nd most ACM nominations for a female artist with 48. Miranda Lambert Has 75 nominations. Note: The year of the nomination/win is for the previous calendar year (for example: Reba's win for Female Vocalist of the Year and Entertainer of the Year was presented in 1995 but awarded for 1994).

Year	Nominee / work	Award	Result
1980	Herself	Top New Female Vocalist	Nominated
1983	Herself	Top Female Vocalist	Nominated
1984	Herself	Top Female Vocalist	Won
1985	Herself	Top Female Vocalist	Won
1986	Herself	Top Female Vocalist	Won
1986	"Whoever's in New England"	Country Music Video of the Year	Won
1986	"Whoever's in New England"	Song of the Year	Nominated
1986	"Whoever's in New England"	Single of the Year – Producer	Nominated
1986	"Whoever's in New England"	Single of the Year – Artist	Nominated
1986	Herself	Entertainer of the Year	Nominated
1987	Herself	Top Female Vocalist	Won
1987	Herself	Entertainer of the Year	Nominated
1988	Herself	Top Female Vocalist of the Year	Nominated
1988	"I Know How He Feels"	Song of the Year	Nominated
1988	"Sunday Kind of Love"	Video of the Year - Artist	Nominated
1988	Herself	Entertainer of the Year	Nominated
1988	Herself	Top Female Vocalist	Nominated
1989	"Cathy's Clown"	Country Video of the Year	Nominated
1989	Herself	Top Female Vocalist	Won
1990	Herself (with Vince Gill)	Top Vocal Duet	Nominated
1990	Herself	Entertainer of the Year	Nominated
1991	Herself	Entertainer of the Year	Nominated
1991	Herself	Top Female Vocalist	Won
1991	"Is There Life Out There"	Video of the Year	Won
1992	"The Night the Lights Went Out In Georgia"	Video of the Year	Nominated
1992	"Take It Back"	Video of the Year	Nominated
1992	Herself	Entertainer of the Year	Nominated
1993	"Does He Love You"	Video of the Year	Nominated
1993	Herself (with Linda Davis)	Top Vocal Duet	Nominated
1993	"Does He Love You"	Song of the Year	Nominated
1993	"Does He Love You"	Single Record of the Year - Artist	Nominated
1993	"Does He Love You"	Single Record of the Year - Producer	Nominated
1993	Herself	Top Female Vocalist	Nominated
1993	Herself	Entertainer of the Year	Nominated
1994	Herself	Top Female Vocalist	Won
1994	Herself	Entertainer of the Year	Won
1995	Herself	Top Female Vocalist	Nominated
1995	Herself	Entertainer of the Year	Nominated
1996	Herself	Top Female Vocalist of the Year	Nominated
1997	Herself	Entertainer of the Year	Nominated
1999	Herself (with Brooks & Dunn)	Vocal Event of the Year	Nominated
2002	Herself	Home Depot Humanitarian Award	Won
2003	Herself	Leading Lady Award	Won
2005	Herself	Special Award for Most Female Vocalist Wins	Won
2007	"Because of You" (with Kelly Clarkson)	Vocal Event of The Year	Nominated
2007	"Because of You" (with Kelly Clarkson)	Vocal Event of the Year - Producer	Nominated
2008	Herself (with Brooks & Dunn)	Vocal Event of the Year	Nominated
2009	Herself	Top Female Vocalist of the Year	Nominated
2010	Herself	Top Female Vocalist	Nominated
2010	Herself	Career Achievement Award	Won
2015	Herself	50th Anniversary Milestone Award	Won
2016	"Forever Country"	Video of the Year - Artist	Won
2017	Herself	Mae Boren Axton Award	Won
2018	Herself	Female Vocalist of the Year	Nominated
2021	"Be a Light"	Music Event of the Year	Nominated
2026	"Trailblazer"	Music Event of the Year	Pending

== American Music Awards ==
The American Music Awards is an annual major American music award show by the American Broadcasting Company. It was established in 1973. Reba has won 14 American music awards, and holds the record for "Favorite Country Female Artist" wins with eleven.

Year	Nominee / work	Award	Result
1987	Herself	Favorite Country Female Artist	Nominated
1987	Whoever's In New England	Favorite Country Album	Nominated
1987	Whoever's In New England	Favorite Country Female Video Artist	Won
1988	Whoever's In New England	Favorite Country Video	Nominated
1988	"What Am I Going to Do About You"	Favorite Country Video	Nominated
1988	Herself	Favorite Country Female Artist	Won
1989	Herself	Favorite Country Female Artist	Won
1990	Herself	Favorite Country Female Artist	Won
1991	Herself		Won
1991	Reba Live	Favorite Country Album	Won
1992	Herself	Favorite Country Female Artist	Won
1993	Herself	Favorite Country Female Artist	Won
1993	For My Broken Heart	Favorite Country Album	Won
1994	Herself	Favorite Country Female Artist	Won
1994	It's your Call	Favorite Country Album	Nominated
1995	Read My Mind	Favorite Country Album	Won
1995	Herself	Favorite Country Female Artist	Won
1996	Herself	Favorite Country Female Artist	Nominated
1998	Herself	Favorite Country Female Artist	Won
2001	Herself	Favorite Country Female Artist	Nominated
2004	Herself	Favorite Country Female Artist	Won
2008	Herself	Favorite Country Female Artist	Nominated
2009	Herself	Favorite Country Female Artist	Nominated

== Billboard Music Awards ==
Billboard Music Awards are annual awards based on album and digital songs sales, streaming, radio airplay, touring and social engagement. Reba McEntire has won three awards.

Year	Nominee / work	Award	Result
1994	Herself	Fvorite Female Country Artist	Won
1997	Herself	Fvorite Female Country Artist	Won
2007	Herself	Woman of The Year	Won

== Blockbuster Entertainment Awards ==
The Blockbuster Entertainment Awards was an annual awards show held from 1995 to 2001. Reba McEntire won two out of three nominations.

Year	Nominee / work	Award	Result
1995	Herself	Favorite Female Country Artist	Won
1997	What If It's You	Favorite Album by a Female Country Artist	Won
2001	Herself	Favorite Female Artist - Country	Nominated

== British Country Music Awards ==
The British Country Music Association holds annual awards to honor the best in country music. Reba McEntire has won two awards.

Year	Nominee / work	Award	Result
1999	Herself	International Female Vocalist	Won
2000	Herself	International Female Vocalist	Won

== Canadian Country Music Awards ==
The Canadian Country Music Association holds annual awards to honor the best in Country Music. Reba McEntire has been nominated once.

Year	Nominee / work	Award	Result
2007	Reba Duets	Top Selling Album	Nominated

== CMT Music Awards ==
The CMT Music Awards is a fan-voted awards show for country music videos and television performances. Reba McEntire has received ten nominations.

Year	Nominee / work	Award	Result
2006	"You're Gonna Be"	Most Inspiring Video of the Year	Nominated
2008	"Because of You" (with Kelly Clarkson)	Video of the Year	Nominated
2008	"Because of You" (with Kelly Clarkson)	Collaborative Video of the Year	Nominated
2009	"Cowgirls Don’t Cry" (with Brooks & Dunn)	Collaborative Video of the Year	Nominated
2010	"Consider Me Gone"	Female Video of the Year	Nominated
2010	"Consider Me Gone"	CMT Performance of the Year	Nominated
2011	"If I Were a Boy"	CMT Performance of the Year	Nominated
2011	"Turn On the Radio"	Female Video of the Year	Nominated
2015	"Going Out Like That"	Female Video of the Year	Nominated
2017	"Back to God"	Female Video of the Year	Nominated

== CMT Online Awards ==
CMT Online Awards is an annual online award show, established in 2006 by Country Music Television. This is a "fan-voted" award show, based on the fans going to CMT.com streaming the videos and viewing the artists' pages. The winner in each category received the highest numbers of streams and views on CMT.com.

Year	Nominee / work	Award	Result
2007	"Because of You" (with Kelly Clarkson) at Crossroads	No. 1 Streamed Live Performance	Won
2008	"Because of You" (with Kelly Clarkson) at Crossroads	Video of the year	Nominated
2008	"Because of You" (with Kelly Clarkson) at Crossroads	Tearjerker Video of the year	Nominated
2010	"Consider Me Gone"	Performance of the Year	Nominated
2010	"Consider Me Gone"	Female Video of the Year	Nominated
2015	"Going Out Like That"	Female Video of the Year	Nominated

== Country Music Association Awards ==
The Country Music Association Awards is an annual country music awards show, established in 1967. Reba has been nominated a total of 51 times. Reba has won seven of those awards.

Year	Nominee / work	Award	Result
1983	Herself	Horizon Award	Nominated
1983	Herself	Female Vocalist of the Year	Nominated
1984	Herself	Female Vocalist of the Year	Won
1985	Herself	Female Vocalist of the Year	Won
1985	Herself	Entertainer of the Year	Nominated
1985	"My Kind of Country"	Album of the Year	Nominated
1986	Whoever's in New England	Album of the Year	Nominated
1986	Herself	Female Vocalist of the Year	Won
1986	Herself	Entertainer of the Year	Won
1986	Whoever's in New England	Music Video of the Year	Nominated
1986	Whoever's in New England	Single of the Year	Nominated
1987	Herself	Female Vocalist of the Year	Won
1987	Herself	Entertainer of the Year	Nominated
1987	What Am I Gonna Do About You	Album of the Year	Nominated
1987	What Am I Gonna Do About You	Music Video of the Year	Nominated
1988	Herself	Female Vocalist of the Year	Nominated
1988	Herself	Entertainer of the Year	Nominated
1989	Herself	Female Vocalist of the Year	Nominated
1989	Herself	Entertainer of the Year	Nominated
1990	Herself	Female Vocalist of the Year	Nominated
1990	"Oklahoma Swing" (with Vince Gill)	Vocal Event Of The Year	Nominated
1991	Herself	Female Vocalist of the Year	Nominated
1991	Herself	Entertainer of the Year	Nominated
1991	"Rumor Has It"	Album of the Year	Nominated
1991	"Fancy"	Music Video of the Year	Nominated
1992	Herself	Female Vocalist of the Year	Nominated
1992	Herself	Entertainer of the Year	Nominated
1992	For My Broken Heart	Album of the Year	Nominated
1992	"Is There Life Out There"	Music Video of the Year	Nominated
1993	Herself	Female Vocalist of the Year	Nominated
1993	Herself	Entertainer of the Year	Nominated
1993	"The Heart Wont Lie" (with Vince Gill)	Vocal Event Of The Year	Nominated
1994	Rhythm, Country and Blues	Album of the Year	Nominated
1994	Herself	Female Vocalist of the Year	Nominated
1994	Herself	Entertainer of the Year	Nominated
1994	"Does He Love You"	Music Video of the Year	Nominated
1994	"Does He Love You"	Vocal Event Of The Year	Won
1994	"Does He Love You"	Single of the Year	Nominated
1995	Herself	Female Vocalist of the Year	Nominated
1995	Herself	Entertainer of the Year	Nominated
1996	"On My Own"	Vocal Event Of The Year	Nominated
1998	"If You See Him/If You See Her"	Vocal Event Of The Year	Nominated
2000	Herself	International Artist Achievement Award	Won
2004	Herself	Female Vocalist of the Year	Nominated
2007	Herself	Female Vocalist of the Year	Nominated
2007	"Because of You" (with Kelly Clarkson)	Musical Event of the Year	Nominated
2008	"Every Other Weekend"	Musical Event of the Year	Nominated
2009	"Cowgirls Don't Cry" (with Brooks & Dunn)	Musical Event of the Year	Nominated
2009	Herself	Female Vocalist of the Year	Nominated
2010	Herself	Female Vocalist of the Year	Nominated
2011	Herself	Country Music Hall of Fame Inductee	Won
2017	Herself	Female Vocalist of the Year	Nominated
2020	"Be A Light" (with Thomas Rhett, Hillary Scott, Chris Tomlin, Keith Urban)	Musical Event of the Year	Nominated

== French Country Music Awards ==
The French Association of Country Music holds annual awards to honor the best in country music. Reba McEntire has won one award.

Year	Nominee / work	Award	Result
2008	"Every Other Weekend" (with Kenny Chesney)	Best Duo of The Year	Won

== Golden Globe Awards ==
The Golden Globe Awards are accolades bestowed by the 93 members of the Hollywood Foreign Press Association, recognizing excellence in film and television. Reba McEntire has been nominated once.

Year	Nominee / work	Award	Result
2004	Reba	Best Actress in a Television Series – Musical or Comedy	Nominated

== Grammy Awards ==
The Grammy Awards are presented annually by the National Academy of Recording Arts and Sciences of the United States for outstanding achievements in the music industry. The awards were established in 1958. Reba has won three Grammys and has been nominated 17 times.

Year	Nominee / work	Award	Result
1987	"Whoever's in New England"	Best Female Country Vocal Performance	Won
1988	"The Last One to Know"	Best Female Country Vocal Performance	Nominated
1989	Reba	Best Female Country Vocal Performance	Nominated
1991	"You Lie"	Best Female Country Vocal Performance	Nominated
1992	For My Broken Heart	Best Female Country Vocal Performance	Nominated
1993	"The Greatest Man I Never Knew"	Best Female Country Vocal Performance	Nominated
1994	"The Heart Won't Lie" (ft. Vince Gill)	Best Country Collaboration with Vocals	Nominated
1994	"Does He Love You" (ft. Linda Davis)	Best Country Collaboration with Vocals	Won
1995	Read My Mind	Best Country Album	Nominated
1995	"She Thinks His Name Was John"	Best Female Country Vocal Performance	Nominated
1996	"On My Own" (with Trisha Yearwood, Martina McBride and Linda Davis)	Best Country Collaboration with Vocals	Nominated
1999	"If You See Him/If You See Her" (with Brooks & Dunn)	Best Country Collaboration with Vocals	Nominated
2001	"What Do You Say (video)"	Best Short Form Video	Nominated
2008	"Because of You" (ft. Kelly Clarkson	Best Country Collaboration with Vocals	Nominated
2018	Sing It Now: Songs of Faith & Hope	Best Roots Gospel Album	Won
2020	Stronger Than the Truth	Best Country Album	Nominated
2023	"Does He Love You" (revisited) (with Dolly Parton)	Best Country Duo/Group Performance	Nominated
2026	"Trailblazer" (with Miranda Lambert and Lainey Wilson)	Best Country Duo/Group Performance	Nominated

== Kennedy Center Honors ==
The Kennedy Center Honors is an annual honor given to those in the performing arts for their lifetime of contributions to American culture. The honors have been presented annually since 1978, culminating each December in a star-studded gala celebrating the honorees in the Kennedy Center Opera House. Reba is the 8th of 8 Country Music artists to be honored so far.

Year	Nominee / work	Award	Result	Ref.
2018	Reba	Kennedy Center Honors	Won	

== People's Choice Awards ==
The People's Choice Awards are a venue for the American public to honor their favorite actors and actresses, musical performers, television shows, and motion pictures, and is voted on by the general public. Reba McEntire has won nine awards from thirteen nominations.

Year	Nominee / work	Award	Result
1992	Herself	Favorite Female Country Performer	Won
1992	Herself	Favorite Female Musical Performer	Won
1993	Herself	Favorite Female Musical Performer	Won
1993	Herself	Favorite Female Country Performer	Nominated
1994	Herself	Favorite Female Country Performer	Won
1994	Herself	Favorite Female Musical Performer	Nominated
1995	Herself	Favorite Female Country Performer	Won
1995	Herself	Favorite Female Musical Performer	Nominated
1996	Herself	Favorite Female Musical Performer	Won
1997	Herself	Favorite Female Musical Performer	Won
1998	Herself	Favorite Female Musical Performer	Won
2002	Reba	Favorite Female Actress In A New Television Series	Won
2016	Herself	Favorite Female Country Artist	Nominated
2017	Herself	Favorite Female Country Artist	Nominated

== Saturn Awards ==
The Saturn Awards are presented annually by the Academy of Science Fiction, Fantasy and Horror Films to honor science fiction, fantasy, and horror films and television. Reba McEntire has been nominated once.

Year	Nominee / work	Award	Result
1991	Tremors	Best Supporting Actress	Nominated

== TNN/Music City Awards ==
The Nashville Network and the Music City News held an annual awards show from 1990 to 1999, winners were voted upon by general public. Reba McEntire won six awards.

Year	Nominee / work	Award	Result
1991	Herself	Female artist of the year	Won
1992	Herself	Female artist of the year	Won
1993	Herself	Female artist of the year	Won
1994	"Does He Love You" (with Linda Davis)	Vocal Collaboration of the year	Won
1995	Herself	Female artist of the year	Won
1998	Herself	Minnie Pearl Award	Won

== TNN Viewer's Choice Awards ==
The Nashville Network held Viewer's Choice Awards in 1988 and 1989, the winners were voted on by the general public. Reba McEntire won two awards.

Year	Nominee / work	Award	Result
1988	Herself	Favorite Female Vocalist	Won
1989	Herself	Favorite Female Vocalist	Won

== Other awards and honors ==
- 1986 Grand Ole Opry, Inducted
- 1987 NARM, Top Selling Female Country Album - Whoever's In New England
- 1990 Saturn Awards, nominated for Best Supporting Actress for Tremors
- 1994 Country Radio Awards, Entertainer of the Year
- 1994 Country Radio Awards, Female Vocalist
- 1996 Country Weekly Golden Pick Awards, Favorite Entertainer
- 1997 Country Weekly Golden Pick Awards, Favorite Female Vocalist
- 1998 Hollywood Walk of Fame, Inducted
- 1999 CMT International Awards, Video Event of the Year - "If You See Him/If You See Her"
- 2001 Drama Desk Awards, Special Award - Annie Get Your Gun
- 2001 Theater World Award, Annie Get Your Gun
- 2002 CMT 40 Greatest Women of Country Music, #6 ranking
- 2002 Cheyenne Frontier Days Hall of Fame
- 2003 Country Radio Broadcasters, Career Achievement Award
- 2004 New Music Weekly, Favorite Female Country Artist
- 2004 CMT Flameworthy Awards, Johnny Cash Visionary Award
- 2005 Family Television Awards, Best Actress, Reba
- 2006 CMT Giants, Inaugural Honoree
- 2006 Music City Walk of Fame, Inducted
- 2007 Billboard Magazine, Woman of the Year
- 2008 ASCAP, Golden Note Award
- 2009 Country Radio Association, Most Played Country Female Artist
- 2009 Country Radio Association, Most Top Ten Singles For Country Artist
- 2010 A Capitol Fourth National Artistic Achievement Award
- 2011 CMT's 20 Greatest Women, #1 ranking
- 2011 Country Music Hall of Fame, Inducted
- 2012 Hollywood Bowl Hall of Fame, Induction
- 2014 American Country Countdown Awards, Nash Icon Award
- 2015 Andrea Bocelli Foundation, Humanitarian Award
- 2018 Horatio Alger Award
