= Reba McEntire =

American country singer and actress (born 1955)

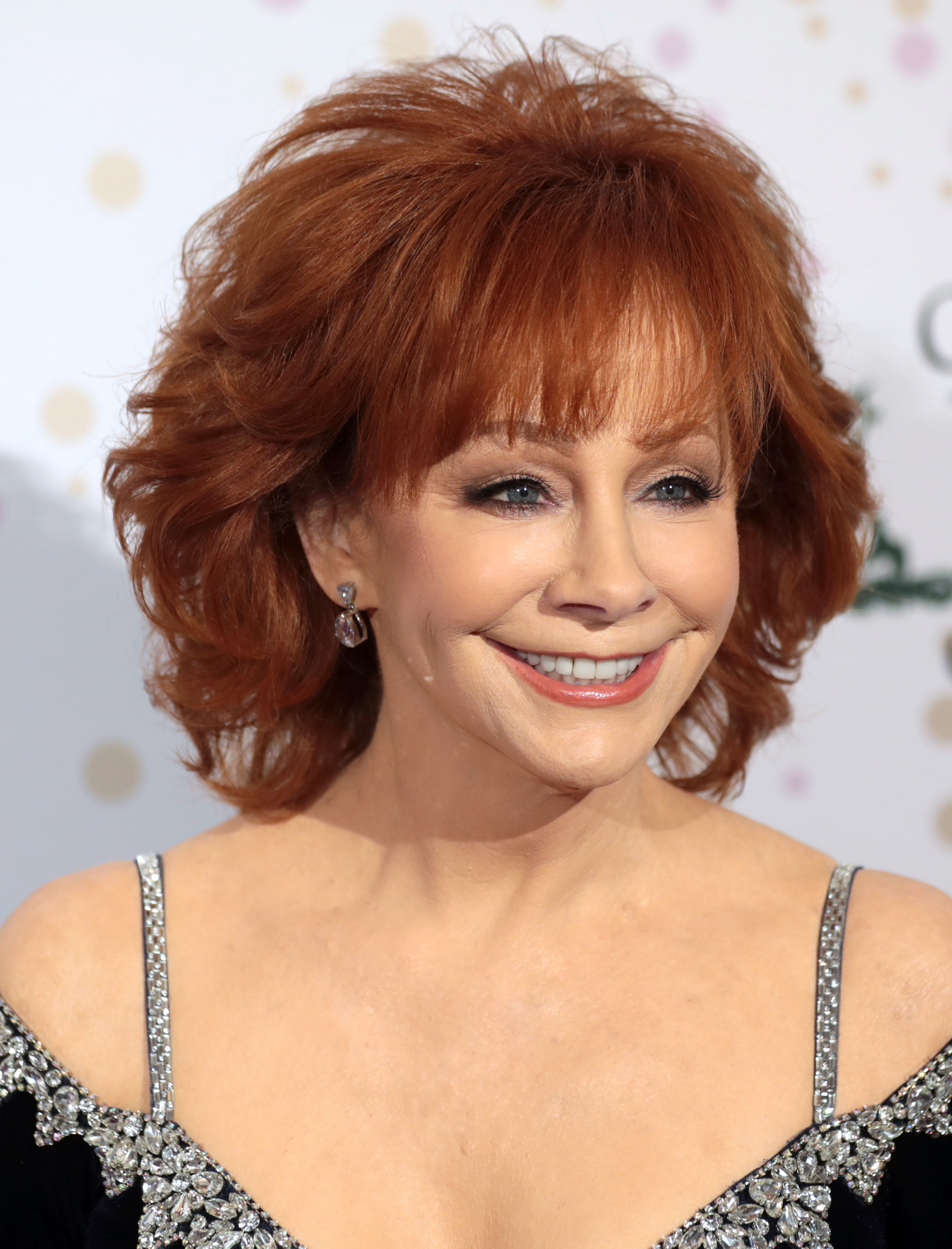
- McEntire in 2022
- Born: Reba Nell McEntire; March 28, 1955 (age 71); McAlester, Oklahoma, U.S.
- Other names: "The Queen of Country"; Reba
- Education: Southeastern Oklahoma State University (BSc)
- Occupations: Singer; actress; television personality; producer; businesswoman
- Years active: 1975–present
- Works: Albums; singles; videography
- Spouses: Charlie Battles (m. 1976; div. 1987); Narvel Blackstock (m. 1989; div. 2015)
- Partner(s): Anthony Lasuzzo (2017–2019); Rex Linn (2020–present; engaged)
- Children: Shelby Blackstock (biological son); Brandon Blackstock (step-son); Shawna Rene Blackstock (step-daughter); Chassidy Blackstock (step-daughter)
- Relatives: Susie McEntire (sister); Pake McEntire (brother); Kelly Clarkson (step-daughter-in-law); River Rose Blackstock (granddaughter); Remington Alexander Blackstock (grandson)
- Awards: Full list
- Musical career
- Genres: Country; gospel
- Instruments: Vocals; piano; guitar
- Labels: PolyGram/Mercury; MCA Nashville; Valory; Nash Icon; Big Machine; Rockin' R
- Formerly of: The Singing McEntires
- Website: reba.com

Reba Nell McEntire (/ˈriːbə ˈmækɪntaɪər/ REE-bə MAK-in-tire; born March 28, 1955), or simply Reba, is an American country singer and actress. Dubbed "The Queen of Country", she has sold more than 75 million records worldwide. Since the 1970s, she has placed over 100 singles on the Billboard Hot Country Songs chart, 24 of which reached the number-one spot. An actress in both film and television, McEntire starred in the television series Reba, which aired for six seasons. She also owns several businesses, including a restaurant and a clothing line.

One of four children, McEntire was born and raised in Oklahoma. With her mother's help, she and her siblings formed the Singing McEntires, who played at local events and recorded for a small label. McEntire later enrolled at Southeastern Oklahoma State University and studied to become a public-school teacher. She also continued to occasionally perform and was heard singing at a rodeo event by country performer Red Steagall. Drawn to her singing voice, Steagall helped McEntire secure a country music recording contract with PolyGram/Mercury Records in 1975.

Over the next several years, PolyGram/Mercury released a series of McEntire's albums and singles, which amounted to little success. In the early 1980s, McEntire's music gained more momentum through several top-10 country songs, including "(You Lift Me) Up to Heaven", "I'm Not That Lonely Yet", and her first number one "Can't Even Get the Blues". Yet McEntire became increasingly unhappy with her career trajectory and signed with MCA Records in 1984. Her second MCA album titled My Kind of Country (1984) became her breakout release, spawning two number-one Billboard country singles and pointed toward a more traditional musical style. Through the 1980s, McEntire released seven more studio albums and had ten more number-one country hits. Her number-one singles included "One Promise Too Late", "The Last One to Know", and the Grammy Award-winning "Whoever's in New England".

In 1991, McEntire lost eight of her band members in a plane crash in San Diego, California. The experience led to McEntire's critically acclaimed album For My Broken Heart, her highest-selling album. She followed it with several commercially successful albums during the 1990s, including Read My Mind (1994), What If It's You (1996), and If You See Him (1998). These albums featured the number-one country singles "The Heart Is a Lonely Hunter", "How Was I to Know", and a duet with Brooks and Dunn called "If You See Him/If You See Her". McEntire's acting career began in January 1990 when she made her film debut in Tremors. In 2001, she played the role of Annie Oakley in the Broadway musical Annie Get Your Gun. That same year, The WB launched the TV series Reba, in which she starred. More recently, she has guest-starred on Young Sheldon as June Ballard and had a main role in the third season of Big Sky. From 2023 to 2025, McEntire was featured as a coach on four seasons of the reality competition show The Voice. Since autumn 2024 she has starred in the NBC sitcom Happy's Place.

== Early life ==
McEntire was born in McAlester, Oklahoma, in 1955 but was raised on a ranch in Chockie, Oklahoma. She was the third of four children born to Clark (1927–2014) and Jacqueline (née Smith) McEntire (1926–2020). Her grandfather, John Wesley McEntire, was a world-champion steer roper in 1934, while her father held the same title three times (1957, 1958, and 1961). Jacqueline McEntire had aspirations of becoming a country singer, but instead became a public-school teacher, librarian, and secretary. While her mother was tender and loving, her father had trouble showing affection. "When we were growing up, I used to regret that Daddy never told us that he loved us," she recalled in her autobiography. The McEntire family owned a cattle ranch. Each family member contributed to running the cattle operation. The McEntire children helped with ranch chores before and after school. This included castrating bulls and giving them worm medicine.

The McEntire siblings also developed an interest in singing, which was encouraged by their mother. On car trips to their father's rodeo dates, Jacqueline McEntire taught her children to sing in harmony with one another. Young Reba then started performing at school, beginning in first grade when she sang "Away in a Manger" at an elementary-school Christmas pageant. In fifth grade, she joined the 4-H club and won first place in the Junior Act Division for singing "My Sweet Little Alice Blue Gown". She also played basketball and ran track. For several summers, she attended a basketball camp. She also learned piano and guitar. She also developed an interest in the rodeo and trained to become a barrel racer.

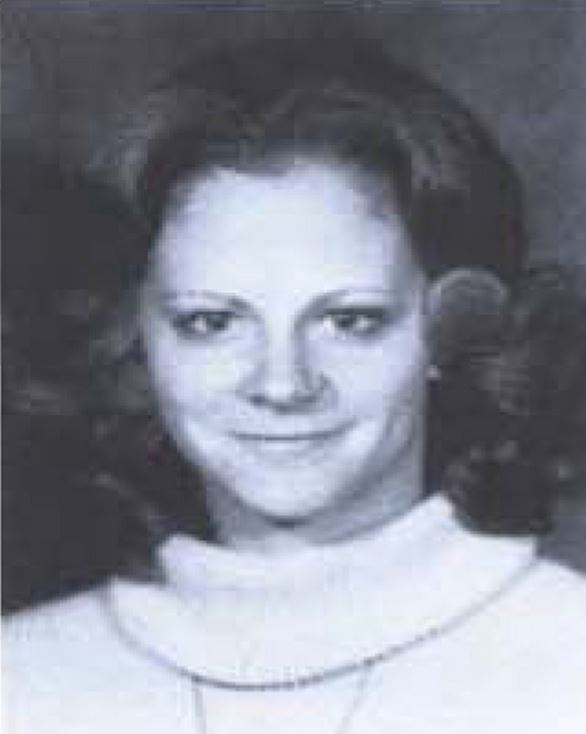
McEntire in her 1974 college yearbook: She received a bachelor's degree in elementary education before pursuing country music full-time.

By high school, the McEntire siblings had been frequently performing. Together, they formed a trio which they called the Singing McEntires. In 1971, the trio released a single about their famous grandfather called "The Ballad of John McEntire". It was pressed as a single by a local label and was issued in small numbers regionally. The trio eventually included a backing band, who performed at local functions. The group was later named the Kiowa High School Cowboy Band. They also had paying gigs at bars at dance halls in nearby Oklahoma City. "We were a bunch of kids barely in puberty who didn't get to bed until almost daylight after some of our shows," McEntire remembered. The band parted ways once Reba's brother graduated from high school. In 1973, McEntire graduated from Kiowa High School.

Once finishing high school, McEntire enrolled in college at Southeastern Oklahoma State University. She majored in elementary education with a minor in music. She completed student teaching and later graduated with a bachelor's degree. She also continued to help out on her family's ranch during her college years. In 1974, McEntire's father encouraged her to take a job opportunity singing "The Star-Spangled Banner" at the National Finals Rodeo in Oklahoma City. She contacted family friend and rodeo announcer Clem McSpadden, who helped her get hired for the gig. Following one of her performances, McEntire was heard by country artist Red Steagall who was impressed by her singing. Reba, her siblings, and her mother later joined him at a hotel party the same week. At the hotel, Reba performed an a cappella version of Dolly Parton's "Joshua". Jacqueline McEntire asked Steagall if he was able to help get all her children a recording contract. After going back to Nashville, Steagall contacted her in early 1975, and said, "I can't take all three. But I could take Reba. She's got something a little different."

In March 1975 and accompanied by her mother, McEntire embarked on a trip to Nashville, Tennessee, to record a demonstration tape that Steagall hoped to pass along to record labels. At the start of the trip, she was unsure about pursuing a professional country music career. McEntire recalled in her memoir continually making excuses for her mother to stop the car instead of traveling to Nashville. After noticing her daughter's fear, Jacqueline McEntire told her, "Now, Reba, let me tell you something. If you don't want to go to Nashville, we don't have to do this. But I'm living all my dreams through you." The conversation changed her mind and they continued on to Nashville.

After recording a demo, McEntire's tape was heard by Glenn Keener of PolyGram/Mercury Records, who was interested in signing her to a Nashville contract. Keener brought McEntire's tape and another woman's tape to PolyGram's Chicago headquarters. The label informed Keener that he could only sign one female performer. "He looked at the two tapes in his hand and handed 'em mine," McEntire told Entertainment Weekly.

== Music career ==
=== 1976–1983: Career launch at Mercury ===
In November 1975, McEntire signed a country music recording contract with PolyGram/Mercury Records. She made her first recordings for the label in January 1976. She was produced by Glenn Keener and was backed by a Countrypolitan arrangement that included a string section. McEntire's debut single released in 1976 was titled "I Don't Want to Be a One Night Stand". The track failed to become a major hit, only peaking at number 88 on the Billboard Hot Country Songs chart that May. It was followed by the low-charting Billboard country singles "(There's Nothing Like the Love) Between a Woman and Man" and "Glad I Waited Just for You". Mercury issued her self-titled debut album in 1977. In his album review, Greg Adams of AllMusic compared it to the country crossover style of Barbara Mandrell and Tammy Wynette. McEntire also began touring and performing more frequently. Without a band of her own, she often relied on house bands to accompany her. In some instances, the backing bands did not know country music and McEntire would have to fill her time onstage with jokes.

McEntire's career gained more momentum by 1978. That year, she collaborated on two singles with country artist Jacky Ward. The duo's double-sided release of "I'd Really Love to See You Tonight"/"Three Sheets in the Wind" became her first top-20 hit on the country chart. When Glenn Keener left the PolyGram/Mercury roster, McEntire inherited producer Jerry Kennedy. Kennedy produced her second studio album titled Out of a Dream (1979). The album's cover of Patsy Cline's "Sweet Dreams" became her first top-20 hit as a solo artist. Four additional top-40 country singles were spawned from the album, as well. By 1980, McEntire had formed her own band, which included sister Susie and brother Pake McEntire. She also hired a new manager. McEntire and her band toured to dates in a three-car caravan, which included a horse trailer for transporting instruments. She later upgraded to a bus nicknamed Silver Eagle, which routinely broke down. Also in 1980, "(You Lift Me) Up to Heaven" became her first top-10 hit on the country songs chart. It was included on her third studio album, Feel the Fire, which was released in October.

By this point, McEntire's label pushed her to record music in a soft country-pop style with which she often disagreed. Future material (which included her next album) was recorded in this format. Her fourth album, Heart to Heart was issued in 1981 and became her first disc to chart the Billboard Country Albums list. It received only a 2.5 star review from AllMusic's William Ruhlmann, who described McEntire as being "a promising, but not yet accomplished country artist." Its lead single, "Today All Over Again", became her highest-charting country single yet, reaching number five. In 1983, McEntire's bus had broken down when she was informed that her latest single "Can't Even Get the Blues" reached the number-one spot on the Billboard country chart. It was followed by her second number-one song "You're the First Time I Thought About Leaving". The track also became her second to reach the top 10 of Canada's RPM country songs chart. Both singles appeared on her 1983 album Unlimited. The following year, the single "Why Do We Want (What We Know We Can't Have)" reached the top 10. With increased success in the country music industry, she was able to arrange an early release from PolyGram/Mercury in 1983. "Let me put it this way, I've sorta taken my career into control myself," she explained of the decision.

=== 1984–1990: Breakthrough ===
McEntire signed with MCA Records in 1984 and released her seventh studio album Just a Little Love. Harold Shedd was originally intended to produce the disc, but McEntire rejected his desire for a country-pop arrangement. Instead, Norro Wilson produced the project. Despite spawning a top-10 hit, McEntire was still dissatisfied with the record's production and the lack of control over material. Instead, she turned to MCA president Jimmy Bowen who suggested that she find her own songs to record. Accompanied by Don "Dirt" Lanier, McEntire spent several days listening to various songs from publishing companies. Eventually, she found a song written by Harlan Howard titled "Somebody Should Leave" and a song by Jon Moffat titled "How Blue". Released as singles, they reached the number-one spot on the country songs chart and later appeared on 1984's My Kind of Country. The collection also included several covers of classic country songs by Ray Price, Charley Pride, and Connie Smith. AllMusic's William Ruhlmann gave the disc 4.5 stars. Billboard magazine described McEntire on the album as being "the finest woman country singer since Kitty Wells." United Press wrote that the album "represents a victory for McEntire. She has pulled in the reins of her career, regained control of her music and her life." The album became her breakthrough recording, leading McEntire to winning 1984's Female Vocalist of the Year accolade from the Country Music Association. Along with music by George Strait and Randy Travis, the album also brought forth a stylistic change in country towards traditional arrangements and sounds.

Her next MCA album was 1985's Have I Got a Deal for You. The project followed the same traditional country format of its predecessor. It was produced by Jimmy Bowen, along with co-production credits from McEntire herself. The album's title track reached the Billboard country top 10 along with "Only in My Mind", a song composed by McEntire herself. Just a few months later, on October 19, McEntire performed the National Anthem at game one of the 1985 World Series. In February 1986, her ninth studio album was released named Whoever's in New England. On the record, McEntire and co-producer Jimmy Bowen mixed a traditional country style with a modern, contemporary sound. Author Kurt Wolff described the title track's production as being "bigger and sentimentalism more obvious, even manipulative". Issued as the lead single, the title track peaked at number one on the Billboard country chart and won McEntire the Grammy Award for Best Female Country Vocal Performance. The album itself became her first to top the Billboard Country Albums survey. and later certified platinum by the Recording Industry Association of America for sales of one million copies.

"Whoever's in New England"
McEntire's 1986 single helped establish her as a more contemporary artist that continued to exhibit traditional country music styles. The song later won her a Grammy award in 1987.

By this point McEntire had reached the height of her commercial stardom. Following this, McEntire made changes to her stage show. She began implementing choreography and experimented with stage lighting. Also in 1986, McEntire's twelfth studio album appeared titled What Am I Gonna Do About You. AllMusic found that it lacked the features that had made Whoever's in New England unique. The title track was the lead single from the release. It became her next number one song on the Billboard country chart and her first number one on the RPM Canadian country chart. Its second single, "One Promise Too Late", also topped the country chart. Her 13th studio project, The Last One to Know, was released in 1987 and reached number three on the Billboard country albums chart. Reviewer Tom Roland noted that McEntire chose material that reflected her recent divorce from first husband Charlie Battles. Both the title track and "Love Will Find Its Way to You" topped the Billboard country songs chart. In late 1987, McEntire released her first Christmas collection called Merry Christmas to You. Also in 1987, she played Carnegie Hall in New York City for the first time.

In the late 1980s, McEntire took more control of her career. She fired her manager and formed her own entertainment company that helped further promote her material. Other new changes included her 1988 pop-inspired release Reba. Her fifteenth studio disc included covers of the former pop hits "Respect" and "A Sunday Kind of Love". It produced the number-one Billboard country singles "New Fool at an Old Game" and "I Know How He Feels". It was followed by 1989's Sweet Sixteen, which was noted to be a more of a "return to the neo-traditionalist fold", according to reviewer William Ruhlmann. The album featured the country hits "'Til Love Comes Again", "Little Girl", "Walk On" and a cover of "Cathy's Clown". Her first live project titled Reba Live was also released in 1989.

Rumor Has It (1990) was another pop-oriented album release featuring a mix of ballads and uptempo numbers. It was the first disc in McEntire's career to reach the top 40 of the Billboard 200 albums chart. The disc would become McEntire's highest-selling album, certifying three-times platinum from the RIAA. Four hit country singles came from the release, including "You Lie" and her cover of Bobbie Gentrys' 1969 single "Fancy". The latter single eventually became one of McEntire's signature songs.

=== 1991: Plane crash and For My Broken Heart ===
"Improper planning/decision by the pilot, the pilot's failure to maintain proper altitude and clearance over mountainous terrain, and the copilot's failure to adequately monitor the progress of the flight. Factors related to the accident were: insufficient terrain information provided by the flight service specialist during the preflight briefing after the pilot inquired about a low-altitude departure, darkness, mountainous terrain, both pilot's lack of familiarity with the geographical area, and the copilot's lack of familiarity with the aircraft."

— The findings from the National Transportation Safety Board following their 1991 investigation of the plane crash.

In the late 1980s, McEntire's touring schedule became increasingly busy. To avoid long bus trips, she and her band began traveling by private planes to concerts. McEntire and her touring band started the 1991 leg of their tour with dates in Alaska; Saginaw, Michigan; Fort Wayne, Indiana, and a private gig for IBM in San Diego, California. Two planes which would carry McEntire's band were scheduled to leave San Diego. McEntire, her husband, and her stylist were to take a different aircraft the next day. In the early hours of March 16, 1991, McEntire was awakened by a phone call from Roger Woolsey, pilot of the second plane. McEntire's husband took the call and discovered that one of the planes had crashed. Following the successful takeoff of both planes, one plane's wing hit the side of Otay Mountain in San Diego, killing everyone on board.

In total, eight members of her band were killed: guitarists Chris Austin and Michael Thomas, keyboardists Kirk Cappello and Joey Cigainero, vocalist Paula Kaye Evans, road manager Jim Hammon, bassist Terry Jackson, and drummer Anthony Saputo. Pilot Donald Holmes and co-pilot Chris Hollinger were also killed. The first plane was a Hawker Siddeley DH-125-1A/522 charter jet that took off at 1:40 am from Brown Field Municipal Airport, located near the Mexico–United States border. After reaching an altitude of 3,400 feet (1,040 m) above sea level, the aircraft crashed on the side of Otay Mountain, located 10 miles (16 km) east of the airport. The National Transportation Safety Board (NTSB) determined the probable cause of the accident was related to "improper pilot planning".

Meanwhile, the second plane carrying the rest of her band made it successfully to an airport in Nashville. McEntire, her husband, and hair stylist returned on their own plane following the accident. "By the time that long, terrible weekend was over, we were emotionally and physically exhausted," McEntire stated in her autobiography. The news was reported nearly immediately to McEntire and her husband, who were sleeping at a nearby hotel. A spokeswoman for McEntire made a statement to The Los Angeles Times on her behalf: "She was very close to all of them. Some of them had been with her for years. Reba is totally devastated by this. It's like losing part of your family. Right now, she just wants to get back to Nashville." Two days after the crash, McEntire conducted an interview with People and scheduled a memorial service for the families of the victims. Nine days following the accident, McEntire performed at the 63rd Academy Awards ceremony, singing the Best Original Song nominee "I'm Checkin' Out" from the film Postcards from the Edge. In addition, Vince Gill and Dolly Parton offered their help in reorganizing her touring band.

McEntire dedicated her 16th album, For My Broken Heart, to the deceased members of her road band. Released in October 1991, it contained songs of sorrow and lost love about "all measure of suffering", according to Alanna Nash of Entertainment Weekly. Nash reported that McEntire "still hits her stride with the more traditional songs of emotional turmoil, above all combining a spectacular vocal performance with a terrific song on 'Buying Her Roses', a wife's head-spinning discovery of her husband's other woman." The disc peaked at number three on the Billboard Top Country Albums chart. It also became her highest-charting release on the Billboard 200 yet, peaking at number 13. It later sold over four million copies in the United States, becoming her best-selling album to date. Its title track and "Is There Life Out There" both became number one Billboard country singles. In addition, "The Greatest Man I Never Knew" and McEntire's cover of "The Night the Lights Went Out in Georgia" both became major country hits.

=== 1992–2002: Continued country success ===
In December 1992, McEntire's 17th album It's Your Call was released. A sign of her increased mainstream success, the album was her first to reach the top 10 of the Billboard 200. It spawned the country hits "Take It Back", the title track and a number one duet with Vince Gill called "The Heart Won't Lie". Critic Brian Mansfield compared the disc to For My Broken Heart, concluding that "only casual or partial listeners will be moved as much." Christopher John Farley of Time wrote that the album ranged from being "relaxing" to "cathartic", and "these vocals from one of the best country singers linger in the mind". For her next release, McEntire collaborated with up-and-coming artist Linda Davis on the single "Does He Love You". MCA Records encouraged McEntire to record the track with more established acts like Wynonna Judd or Trisha Yearwood, but ultimately finalized the track with Davis. It became her 18th number-one hit on the Country Songs chart and her 16th topper on the Canadian country chart. It was later included on her 1993 compilation Greatest Hits Volume Two. Later that year, Davis and McEntire performed the duet at the CMA Awards. For her performance, McEntire wore a red dress with a plunging neckline that created controversy among the Nashville community.

Her 18th studio release was 1994's Read My Mind. The disc reached number two on both the Billboard 200 and the Top Country Albums chart. The disc later reached sales of three million copies in the United States and certified three times platinum from the RIAA. Five major hits came from the release, including "The Heart Is a Lonely Hunter", "Till You Love Me" and a song about a woman contracting AIDS called "She Thinks His Name Was John". The last recording only reached a top-20 charting position due to its controversial lyrics. McEntire's 19th studio album, Starting Over (1995) is a collection of her favorite songs originally recorded by others. The album was made to commemorate McEntire's 20 years in the music industry. The album received a less favorable response from critics than that of her previous releases. While the project spawned three charting singles, only McEntire's cover of "Ring on Her Finger, Time on Her Hands" became a top-10 country song. Starting Over was certified platinum by the RIAA within the first two months of its release.

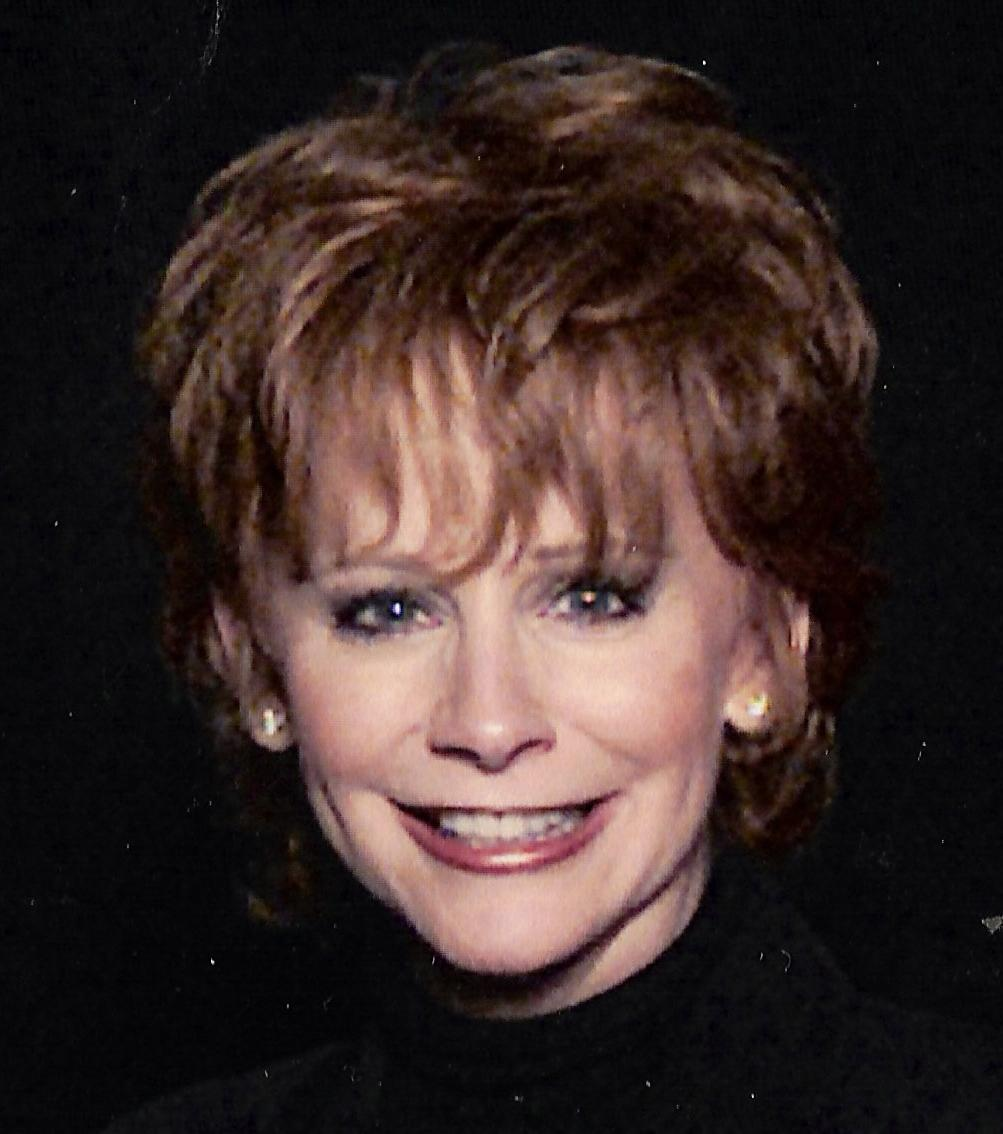
McEntire in Washington, DC, November 2000

McEntire's next album release What If It's You was issued by MCA in November 1996. The record was a return to a contemporary country sound. It debuted at number 15 on the Billboard 200 and eventually topped the Billboard country albums list. It received a more favorable response from radio programmers than that of her 1995 album and received greater promotion. Critic Thom Owens noted that the project "[didn't] offer any new tricks from Reba McEntire, but it is nevertheless an excellent reminder of her deep talents as a vocalist." Its first single, "The Fear of Being Alone" became a top-five hit, while "How Was I to Know" reached the number-one spot on the Billboard country songs survey.

McEntire began touring with country duo Brooks & Dunn during the mid 1990s. Their touring collaborating led to the recording of a duet titled "If You See Him/If You See Her" in 1998. The track topped both the Billboard country songs chart and the Canadian RPM country chart. Their initial collaborations would lead to several more professional endeavors over the years, including a joint Las Vegas residency. The duet was included on McEntire's If You See Him album and Brooks & Dunn's If You See Her album, both of which were released in June 1998. Thom Owens found that both album titles were named nearly the same as "a way to draw attention for both parties, since they were no longer new guns—they were veterans in danger of losing ground to younger musicians". If You See Him produced three more top-10 country hits, including "Forever Love" and "One Honest Heart".

In 1999, McEntire released two albums. In September she issued her second Christmas album, The Secret of Giving: A Christmas Collection. In November, her 22nd studio album, So Good Together was released. Entertainment Weekly commented that most of the album's material was "an odd set—mostly ballads, including an English/Portuguese duet with Jose e Durval on Boz Scaggs' 'We're All Alone'". It featured the top-five country songs "What Do You Say" and "I'll Be". McEntire focused on an acting career in the early 2000s and took a temporary musical hiatus. One exception was 2001's "I'm a Survivor". The single became a top-five country hit and the theme song to McEntire's 2001 television series.

=== 2003–2015: Country music comeback, record label switch, and continued music success ===
McEntire returned to her recording career in August 2003 with the release of the MCA single "I'm Gonna Take That Mountain". The song was included on her first studio album in four years titled Room to Breathe (November 2003). "The reason I named the album Room to Breathe is because I needed a little room to breathe," McEntire told Billboard. The 12-track disc was produced by Buddy Cannon and Norro Wilson. It also featured a guest appearance from Vince Gill. Room to Breathe debuted at number four on the Billboard country chart and later certified platinum in the United States. It spawned McEntire's first number-one song in six years titled "Somebody". Also featured was the top-10 single "He Gets That from Me". In 2004, she embarked on her first tour in several years, also titled Room to Breathe, which included 36 cities in the United States. In 2005, MCA released the double-disc compilation titled Reba #1's while she was between albums.

In September 2007, McEntire's next studio disc was released titled Reba: Duets. The album was a collection of duets with various music artists, including Kenny Chesney, LeAnn Rimes, Trisha Yearwood, Carole King, and Justin Timberlake. Reba: Duets topped the Billboard country chart and the Billboard 200, becoming her first album in her career to reach the top of both lists. Reba: Duets was later certified platinum by the RIAA. The album was given high critical praise from magazines such as PopMatters, which compared McEntire to artists like Janis Joplin and Tina Turner. AllMusic's Thom Jurek gave it 3.5 stars, commenting that "it's full of good to great songs delivered in mostly interesting ways." The first single was a duet version of Kelly Clarkson's "Because of You", which reached number two on the American country chart and topped the Canadian country songs chart.

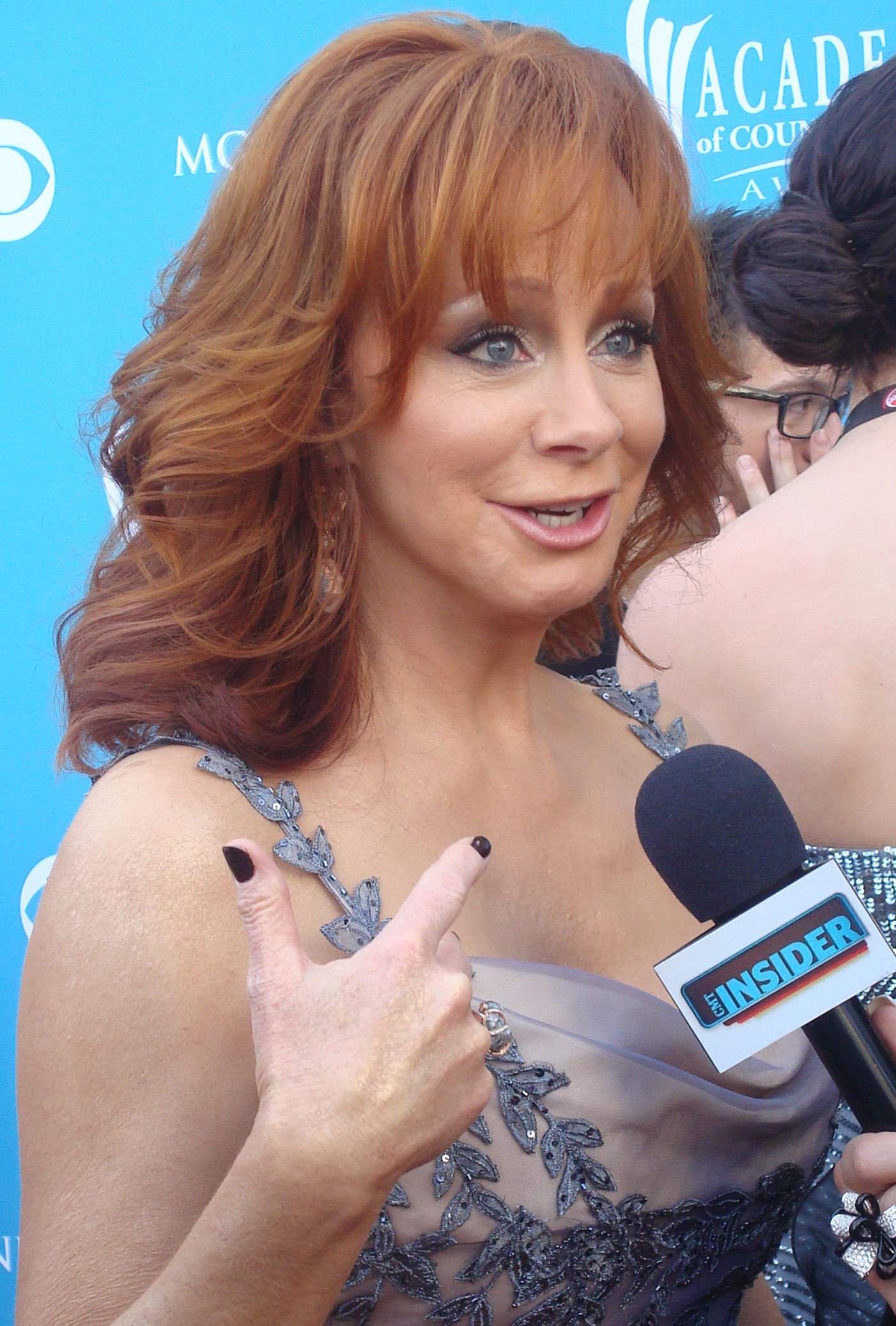
McEntire attending the 45th Annual Academy of Country Music Awards

In 2008, McEntire announced that she would be departing her label of 25 years and signing with the Valory Music Group, an imprint of Big Machine Records. The switch to Valory reunited McEntire with the label's president, Scott Borchetta, with whom she had worked previously. Her first Valory single was 2009's "Strange". The song debuted at number 39 Billboard country songs chart, giving McEntire the highest single debut of her career and peaked at number 11. Her 26th studio album, Keep on Loving You, was released in August 2009 and also topped both the Billboard Country and 200 charts. In 2009, "Consider Me Gone" (spawned as the record's second single) became her 24th number-one on the Billboard chart in December. At age 54, McEntire became one of the oldest women to have a number-one single on the country songs chart.

McEntire's 29th studio album, All the Women I Am, was released in November 2010. Steve Morse of The Boston Globe called the project "one of her best efforts", while Thom Jurek at AllMusic only gave it a 2.5 star rating, calling it "awkward" and lacking a "center". "Turn On the Radio" was issued as the lead single prior to the album, eventually becoming her twenty-fourth number one on the Billboard country survey. Three additional charting singles were spawned from All the Women I Am that peaked outside the top 20. Her All the Women I Am Tour followed shortly after featuring country acts the Band Perry, Steel Magnolia, and Edens Edge.

In 2014, McEntire moved to Big Machine's new imprint for veteran artists titled Nash Icon Music. Her first Nash Icon single was 2015's "Going Out Like That", which reached the top 25 of the Billboard country songs chart. It was included on her 2015 Nash Icon album Love Somebody. The album topped the country albums chart and charted the top five of the Billboard 200. In 2016, McEntire released a third Christmas-themed studio album called My Kind of Christmas. The album was exclusively sold at Cracker Barrel and online. She also announced she would soon be selling her own line of clothing, home decor, jewelry, and other things under the "Rockin' R by Reba" line, also at Cracker Barrel.

=== 2017–present: New beginnings in her 60s ===
After her split from ex-husband Narvel Blackstock, McEntire took control of her career as her own manager. She recruited Justin McIntosh of Starstruck Entertainment, Leslie Matthews serving as brand manager, and Carolyn Snell who had been with McEntire for nine years. They formed Reba's Business Inc. (RBI). She moved out of the building where Blackstock and she had worked, and moved her company to Green Hills, Nashville.

On December 15, 2016, McEntire announced that she was releasing her first gospel album titled Sing It Now: Songs of Faith & Hope. It was released by Nash Icon/Rockin' R Records on February 3, 2017, and consists of two discs. Disc one contains traditional hymns, while disc two contains original tracks. "Softly and Tenderly", featuring Kelly Clarkson and Trisha Yearwood, was the first track off the album released. Another track on the album, "In the Garden/Wonderful Peace", features the Isaacs. Jay DeMarcus of the Rascal Flatts produced the album. The first single off the album is "Back to God". In January 2018, McEntire won the Grammy Award for Best Roots Gospel Album, her first nomination since 2007, and her first Grammy Award win in more than 20 years, since 1994. She also headlined the C2C: Country to Country festival in the UK alongside Brad Paisley and Zac Brown Band in March. Because of its limited release in 2016, on October 13, 2017 My Kind of Christmas was re-released - this time including songs with Vince Gill, Amy Grant, Darius Rucker, and Lauren Daigle - on her website and through iTunes. In July 2018, it was announced that McEntire would be one of four honorees for the 41st annual Kennedy Center Honors, along with Cher, Philip Glass, and Wayne Shorter. The ceremony was held December 2, 2018, and broadcast on CBS December 26, 2018.

McEntire released her 29th studio album Stronger Than the Truth on April 5, 2019. McEntire also returned to host the 54th Academy of Country Music Awards on April 8, 2019. On February 20, 2020, during a surprise appearance at the Country Radio Seminar, McEntire announced she had signed a new record deal with MCA Nashville, returning to the label after leaving in November 2008. McEntire hosted the 54th Annual Country Music Association Awards alongside Darius Rucker in November 2020. McEntire previously hosted in 2019 with Carrie Underwood and Dolly Parton, 1992 with Vince Gill, 1991 by herself (the second solo female host), and 1990 with Randy Travis. On October 3, 2022, Reba revealed that she would continue her Reba: Live in Concert tour going through 2023 and play New York City's Madison Square Garden for the first time. In 2021, a duet version of the song "Does He Love You" with Dolly Parton was released. In 2024, McEntire sang the national anthem during Super Bowl LVIII, and she was accompanied by deaf actor Daniel Durant in American Sign Language.

== Acting career ==
=== 1989–1999: Entry into film and television acting ===
In 1989, she obtained her first film role playing Heather Gummer in the horror comedy Tremors, along with Kevin Bacon. The film told the story of a small group of people, living in Nevada, who were fighting subterranean worm-like creatures. Critic Roger Ebert's positive review said the husband-and-wife survivalists played by McEntire and Michael Gross were one of the best parts of Tremors. After the film's release in 1990, McEntire developed a strong interest in acting and made it her second career. The film earned McEntire a nomination for Best Supporting Actress at the 1991 Saturn Awards. The following year, she starred along with Kenny Rogers and Burt Reynolds in the made-for-television movies The Gambler Returns: The Luck of the Draw and The Man From Left Field. In 1994, McEntire worked with director Rob Reiner in the film North, playing Ma Tex.

In 1994, McEntire starred in Is There Life Out There?, a television movie based on her song of the same name. The following year, she appeared in Buffalo Girls, which was based upon the life of western cowgirl Calamity Jane (played by Anjelica Huston). Playing Jane's friend Annie Oakley, Buffalo Girls was nominated for an Emmy award. In 1996, McEntire was cast by director James Cameron as Molly Brown in his film Titanic. However, when it became apparent production for the film would extend well beyond its original length, McEntire had to turn down the part, as she had already scheduled prior concert engagements. The role was recast with Kathy Bates. In 1998, she starred as Lizzie Brooks in Forever Love, which was based upon McEntire's hit single of the same name.

=== 2000–2007: Broadway and television series ===
In early 2001, McEntire expanded into theater, starring in the Broadway revival of Annie Get Your Gun. Playing Annie Oakley (whom she had previously portrayed in Buffalo Girls), her performance was critically acclaimed by several newspapers, including The New York Times, which commented, "Without qualification the best performance by an actress in a musical comedy this season." McEntire personally called the musical "some of the hardest work I've ever done in my life".

In 2005, McEntire starred as Nellie Forbush in the Carnegie Hall concert production of the Broadway musical South Pacific with Alec Baldwin as Luther Billis and Brian Stokes Mitchell as Emile de Becque, directed by Walter Bobbie, and with an adapted script by David Ives. The concert was broadcast as part of the Great Performances series in 2006.

In October 2001, McEntire premiered her half-hour television sitcom Reba on The WB. The show was based around divorced mother Reba Hart, who learns how to handle life situations after her husband divorces her to marry his dental hygienist––with whom he had been cheating and gotten pregnant––and then their teenaged daughter becomes pregnant, as well. Reba garnered critical acclaim and success, becoming the network's highest-rated television show for adults ranging from the ages of 18 to 49. The show ran for six seasons and earned McEntire a nomination for a Golden Globe award. It was canceled on February 18, 2007; the series finale had 8.7 million viewers.

=== Since 2011: Brief television return and current projects ===
In September 2011, McEntire confirmed on her website that ABC had ordered a pilot for her second television series Malibu Country. McEntire played a divorced mother of two who moves to Malibu, California, to restart her music career. The pilot was filmed in April 2012 and began production on its first season in August. The pilot for Malibu Country was to premiere November 2, 2012. The show was broadcast Friday nights at 8:30/7:30c on ABC. On May 11, 2012, McEntire tweeted that the show had been picked up. She also was the host in the 2011 NASCAR Award Show in Las Vegas.

Despite reports that Malibu Country was the most-watched freshman comedy in its debut season (8.7 million), the show was canceled on May 10, 2013, after 18 episodes.

In 2016, McEntire was a guest panelist during season 11 of America's Got Talent. During one of the Judge Cuts, McEntire gave the Golden Buzzer to contortionist Sofie Dossi.

In January 2017, it was announced that McEntire would star and produce a Southern drama series for ABC titled Red Blooded. In May, ABC announced it ultimately had turned down the show, so it moved to being shopped around to other networks. In January 2018, Reba was chosen to portray KFC's first female Colonel Sanders. The commercials ran through the end of April 2018.

In 2020, McEntire launched a podcast titled Living and Learning hosted by her former Reba co-star Melissa Peterman and herself.

She made a cameo appearance in the 2021 comedy film Barb and Star Go to Vista Del Mar as a water spirit named Trish, after Annie Mumolo and Kristen Wiig, who wrote, produced, and starred in the film, wrote her an "impassioned letter" asking her to join the film. Director Josh Greenbaum said in an interview, "There's some casting that just clicks. Reba is not only 100% authentic, we knew she would be game."

In May 2022, ABC announced that McEntire will be joining the cast of the drama Big Sky, playing local businesswoman Sunny Barnes in season three.

McEntire starred in Reba McEntire's The Hammer on Lifetime in 2023. The country star reunited with her Reba sitcom co-star Melissa Peterman in the film inspired by the life of traveling Nevada circuit judge Kim Wheeler. The film also stars McEntire's boyfriend Rex Linn as Bart Crawford, a mysterious cowboy with unknown motives, and Kay Shioma Metchie as Vicky, the tough-talking bailiff who serves as Kim's right hand and trusted friend.

In May 2023, it was announced that McEntire would be a coach on The Voice, replacing Blake Shelton. She served as a coach from its 24th season to its 26th season. On May 21, 2024, Asher HaVon, a member of Reba's team, won the 25th season, making McEntire the winning coach on her second season. In May 2025, it was announced that McEntire would return to The Voice after a one season-hiatus for the 28th season, which aired in late 2025.

On September 20, 2023, McEntire reunited with Sofie Dossi, where they collaborated during a result show on season 18 of America's Got Talent, when McEntire sang "Can't Even Get the Blues", while Dossi did her contortion, hand-balancing, and aerial performances.

In January 2024, McEntire was creating a new comedy for NBC, later announced to be titled Happy's Place and co-starring Melissa Peterman.

== Musical styles and legacy ==
McEntire's sound has been influenced by the country music of Bob Wills, Merle Haggard, Dolly Parton, Barbara Mandrell, and Patsy Cline. In college, McEntire attended local dances at the Oklahoma–Texas border, so she could dance to Wills's music, commenting that, "it didn't get any better than dancing to Bob Wills music". She also explained Merle Haggard's influence on her career, stating, "I had every album he ever put out", and would sing "every song he did", along with her brother, Pake and sister, Susie. In addition, her first major hit, "Sweet Dreams", was a remake of Patsy Cline's version of the song, according to McEntire herself.

McEntire's music has been described not only to be built upon traditional country music, but also expand into the genres of country pop, mainstream pop, soul, and rhythm and blues. At times, her music has been criticized for moving away from traditional country music. Many music critics have called her music to be "melodramatic", "formulaic", and "bombastic", particularly after her 1988 album Reba. Studio releases such as Sweet Sixteen, Rumor Has It, It's Your Call, and Starting Over have been described by these terms.

McEntire possesses a contralto vocal range and performs "vocal gymnastics" with her voice, a musical technique in which a singer twirls a note around, using their vibrato. McEntire has credited Dolly Parton for influencing this trait, stating that she always listened to Parton's records and find her style of vocal gymnastics "so pretty".

McEntire has often been regarded as one of country music's most influential female vocalists and most beloved entertainers. She is highly credited for remaining one of country's most popular female artists for nearly four decades, maintaining her success by continually incorporating contemporary musical sounds without changing her traditional vocal style. For numerous artists, she has been credited as an inspiration to their careers in music. The Net Music Countdown second-handedly reported, "That influence has manifested itself in many ways. As a role model, she's shown others how to handle fame with grace and good humor while never backing down from her values or goals. Just as importantly, she's shown others to refuse to accept limitations on what she can do or how much she can achieve." McEntire also explained to the online website, "Whatever I'm doing, I feel like I'm representing country music". "It's always been my main career, and it's where my loyalties lie. I feel like I'm waving the flag of country music wherever I go, and I couldn't be prouder to do it."

== Commercial performance and industry impact ==
McEntire has sold more than 75 million records worldwide, making her one of the best-selling female country artists in history. In the United States, multiple albums have been certified platinum or multi-platinum by the Recording Industry Association of America (RIAA).

Her highest-selling album remains For My Broken Heart (1991), which has been certified four-times platinum by the RIAA. Other multi-platinum releases include Rumor Has It (1990), Read My Mind (1994), and Reba: Duets (2007).

Across four decades, McEntire achieved number-one albums on Billboard's Top Country Albums chart in the 1980s, 1990s, 2000s, and 2010s, reflecting sustained commercial success.

== Personal life ==
McEntire is a Christian, and she has stated that her faith in God has helped her immensely throughout her life.

Two of her siblings have also had careers in the music industry. Her brother Pake dabbled in the country music industry in the late 1980s, but returned to Oklahoma after a brief stint. He owns and operates a 1,000-acre (400 ha) ranch near Coalgate, Oklahoma, and continues to rodeo. Her sister Susie McEntire-Eaton (Martha Susan "Susie" McEntire-Eaton, formerly Luchsinger) is a successful Christian music singer who travels the country with her husband, speaking and performing. She also has an older sister, Alice Foran, a retired social worker who resides in Lane, Oklahoma. Her niece Calamity McEntire is the associate head coach of the University of Illinois women's basketball team.

=== Relationships and family ===
In 1976, McEntire married steer wrestling champion and rancher Charlie Battles, who had two sons from his previous marriage. The couple shared a ranch in Oklahoma. In 1987, McEntire divorced Battles and moved to Nashville, Tennessee to further her career.

In 1989, McEntire married her manager and former steel guitar player Narvel Blackstock. The couple wed at Lake Tahoe on a boat in a private ceremony. Together, the pair took over all aspects of McEntire's career, forming Starstruck Entertainment, which was originally designed to help manage her career. From her marriage to Blackstock, McEntire gained three stepchildren, Chassidy, Shawna, and Brandon. She gave birth to a son, Shelby Steven McEntire Blackstock, in February 1990. On August 3, 2015, a joint statement on McEntire's website announced that Blackstock and she had been separated for a few months after 26 years of marriage. McEntire announced in December 2015 that their divorce had been finalized on October 28, 2015. Despite the divorce, McEntire remains very close to her three stepchildren and the Blackstock family; she considers her stepchildren's children to be her grandchildren.

McEntire's stepson Brandon Blackstock married singer Kelly Clarkson, with whom he has a daughter and a son. Speaking about their impending marriage in 2013, McEntire stated she was "Thrilled to death, to have my buddy as my daughter-in-law. I mean, who could ask for more?" Blackstock and Clarkson's divorce was finalized in March 2022. He died of melanoma on August 7, 2025, at the age of 48.

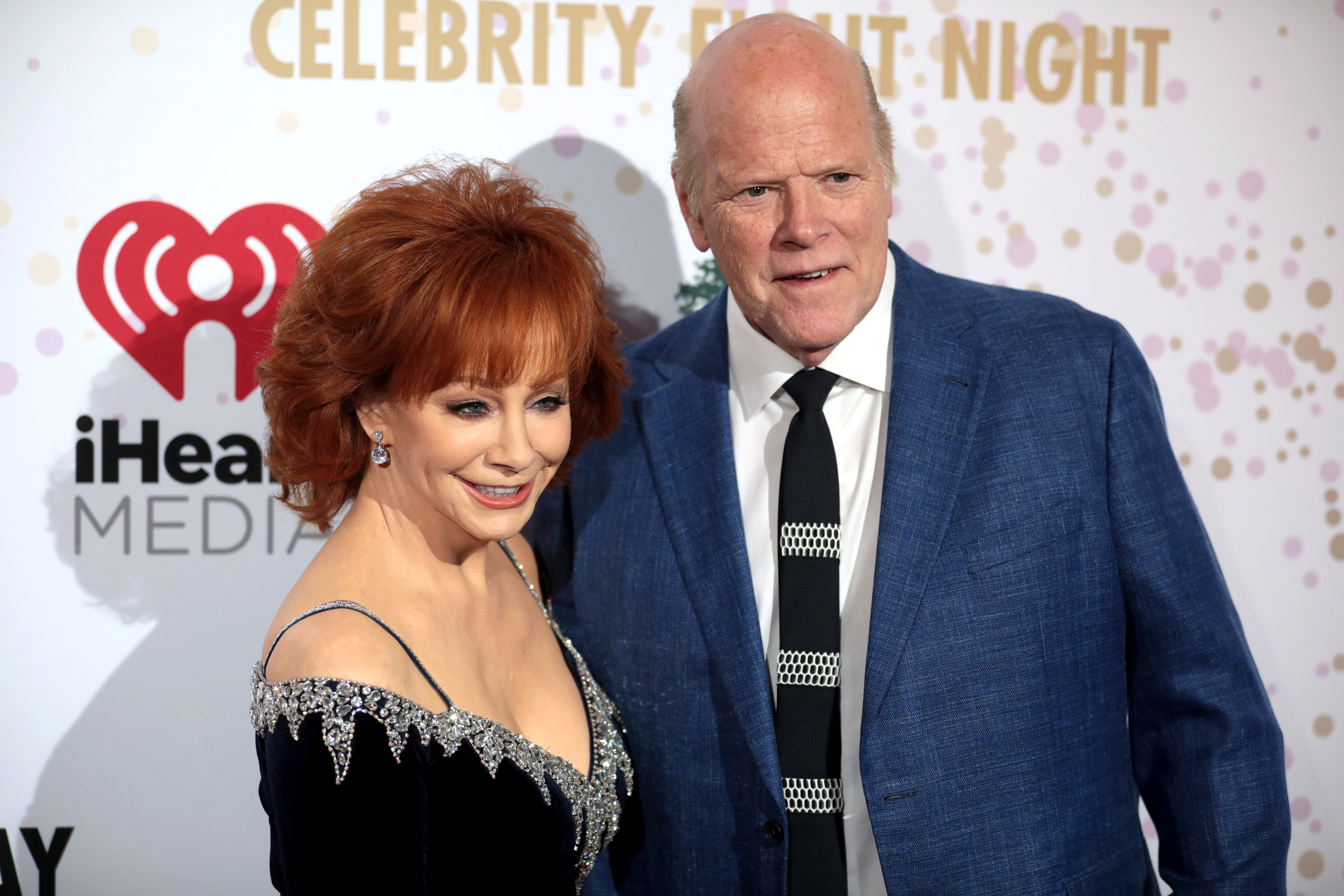
McEntire with her boyfriend Rex Linn in 2022

In 2017, McEntire began a relationship with photographer Anthony "Skeeter" Lasuzzo. The couple met through McEntire's association with Kix Brooks. In describing her feelings about Lasuzzo, she stated in April 2019, "We're totally in love — absolutely," she says. "I wouldn't put up with somebody for two years if I wasn't in love with 'em!" McEntire and Lasuzzo separated six months later.

In 2020, McEntire began dating film and TV actor Rex Linn. They first met on the set of The Gambler Returns: The Luck of the Draw (1991) and reconnected almost 30 years later when McEntire guest-starred as June on Young Sheldon, where Linn had a recurring role as principal of Sheldon's high school. In an interview prior to the 2025 Emmy Awards ceremony, McEntire and Linn announced their engagement. However, the engagement took place months prior in December 2024.

=== Philanthropy ===
In 1992, she opened Reba's Ranch House in Denison, Texas, an extended-stay residence for relatives of patients undergoing treatment at Texoma Medical Center or other nearby facilities.

Over the course of her career, she has been and continues to be an active supporter of various charitable organizations, including Habitat for Humanity, the Salvation Army, the American Red Cross, Feeding America, and Celebrity Fight Night. She has been honored with the Minnie Pearl Award, the ACM Home Depot Humanitarian Award, and the Andrea Bocelli Foundation Humanitarian Award for her efforts. In 2018, she was honored with the Horatio Alger Award for Education, Charity Work. Named after the "rags to riches" writer, the award recognizes perseverance and giving back.

== Accolades ==
McEntire has the second-most wins for the Academy of Country Music's Top Female Vocalist Awards with seven. McEntire holds the record American Music Awards for Favorite Country Female Artist (12). She also holds the distinction of being the first to win the Country Music Association's Female Vocalist of the Year Award four times consecutively. Martina McBride won Female Vocalist four times, although not consecutively. In 2013, Miranda Lambert tied McEntire to win Female Vocalist four years in a row and in 2016 Carrie Underwood joined this elite club by winning her fourth Female Vocalist award. McEntire is also a rare musical artist to achieve solo number-ones across four decades (1980s, 1990s, 2000s, 2010s). She holds the record for second-most CMA Award nominations for a female artist, with 51. McEntire has the second-most ACM Awards nominations for a female artist with 47, respectively. She is also the recipient of three Grammy Awards, winning in 1987, 1994 and 2018. In December 2018, McEntire received the Kennedy Center Honor.

When Reba McEntire made her Grand Ole Opry debut on September 17, 1977, she almost did not make it in the door after a guard at the Opry gate missed her name on the night's list of performers. Her parents and older sister, Alice, drove 1,400 miles round trip from their Oklahoma home to see what turned out to be Reba's three-minute performance that night. Her act was cut from two songs to just one—"Invitation to the Blues"—because of a surprise appearance by Dolly Parton. McEntire was inducted into the Grand Ole Opry on January 17, 1986. "The Grand Ole Opry is a home," she says. "It's a family. It's like a family reunion, when you come back and get to see everybody."

In 2011, the Country Music Association announced that McEntire would be inducted into the Country Music Hall of Fame. McEntire was unable to attend the announcement after her father had slipped into a coma following a stroke. McEntire attended the official induction ceremony alongside the other 2011 inductees Jean Shepard and Bobby Braddock. She was inducted by Dolly Parton.

== Discography ==
=== Studio albums ===
- Reba McEntire (1977)
- Out of a Dream (1979)
- Feel the Fire (1980)
- Heart to Heart (1981)
- Unlimited (1982)
- Behind the Scene (1983)
- Just a Little Love (1984)
- My Kind of Country (1984)
- Have I Got a Deal for You (1985)
- Whoever's in New England (1986)
- What Am I Gonna Do About You (1986)
- The Last One to Know (1987)
- Merry Christmas to You (1987)
- Reba (1988)
- Sweet Sixteen (1989)
- Rumor Has It (1990)
- For My Broken Heart (1991)
- It's Your Call (1992)
- Read My Mind (1994)
- Starting Over (1995)
- What If It's You (1996)
- If You See Him (1998)
- The Secret of Giving: A Christmas Collection (1999)
- So Good Together (1999)
- Room to Breathe (2003)
- Reba: Duets (2007)
- Keep On Loving You (2009)
- All the Women I Am (2010)
- Love Somebody (2015)
- My Kind of Christmas (2016)
- Sing It Now: Songs of Faith & Hope (2017)
- Stronger Than the Truth (2019)

== Tours ==
Headlining tours

- The Reba McEntire Show (1985)
- The Last One to Know Tour (1987)
- North American Tour '88 (1988)
- World Tour '89 (1989)
- '90 Tour (1990)
- Rumor Has It Tour (1991)
- Reba in Concert (1992)
- It's Your Call Tour (1993)
- Read My Mind Tour (1994)
- Starting Over Tour (1995)
- 20th Anniversary Tour (1996-97)
- Singer's Diary (1999-2000)
- Room to Breathe Tour (2004)
- All the Women I Am Tour (2011-12)
- Canadian Tour (2013)
- Reba Live! (2018)
- Summer Tour 2019 (2019)
- Reba: Live in Concert (2022-23)

Co-headlining tours

- Brooks & Dunn and Reba: The Tour (with Brooks & Dunn) (1997–98)
- Girls Night Out (with Martina McBride) (2001)
- 2 Hats and a Redhead (with Brad Paisley and Terri Clark) (2005)
- 2 Worlds 2 Voices Tour (with Kelly Clarkson) (2008)
- Reba and George Strait on Tour (with George Strait) (2010-11)

Residency shows

- Key to the Heart (2006-07)
- Together in Vegas (with Brooks & Dunn) (2015-2021)

Opening act

- Grand Tour* (for George Jones) (1981)
- The Statler Brothers in Concert (for the Statler Brothers) (1983-84)

== Filmography ==
Film
Year	Title	Role	Notes
1990	Tremors	Heather Gummer	
1994	Maverick	Spectator	Uncredited role
1994	North	Ma Tex	
1994	The Little Rascals	A.J. Ferguson	
2001	One Night at McCool's	Dr. Green	
2006	The Fox and the Hound 2	Dixie (voice)	Direct-to-video
2006	Charlotte's Web	Betsy (voice)	
2016	The Land Before Time XIV: Journey of the Brave	Etta (voice)	Direct-to-video
2019	Spies in Disguise	Joy Jenkins (voice)	
2021	Barb and Star Go to Vista Del Mar	Trish	

Television
Year	Title	Role	Notes
1985 – 2012, 2018 – 2019	Academy of Country Music Awards	Herself	with Vince Gill
1990–1992, 2019–2020	Country Music Association Awards	Herself	with Randy Travis: 1990 with Vince Gill: 1992 with Carrie Underwood & Dolly Parton: 2019 with Darius Rucker: 2020
1991	The Gambler Returns: The Luck of the Draw	Burgundy Jones	Television film
1992	WrestleMania VIII	Herself	Television special
1993	The Man from Left Field	Nancy Lee Prinzi	Television film
1994	Frasier	Rachel (voice)	Episode: "Fortysomething"
1994	Is There Life Out There?	Lily Marshall	Television film
1995	Buffalo Girls	Annie Oakley	Main role
1998	Forever Love	Lizzie Brooks	Television film
1998	Hercules	Artemis (voice)	2 episodes
1999	Secret of Giving	Rose Cameron	Television film
2001–2007	Reba	Reba Hart	Main role
2010	Better with You	Lorraine Ashley	Episode: "Better With Flirting"
2011	Working Class	Renee	Episode: "Sugar Mama"
2012–2013	Malibu Country	Reba McKenzie	Main role
2012	Blake Shelton's Not So Family Christmas	Herself	Special
2013	Kelly Clarkson's Cautionary Christmas Music Tale	Herself	Special
2015–16	Baby Daddy	Charlotte	2 episodes
2015	Best Time Ever with Neil Patrick Harris	Herself	Episode: "Reba"
2015	Disney Parks Christmas Day Parade	Herself	Television special
2015, 2023–2025	The Voice	Herself	Coach (season 24–26, 28)
2016	Last Man Standing	Billie Cassidy	Episode: "Outdoor Woman"
2016	America's Got Talent	Herself (guest judge)	Episode: "Judge Cuts 2"
2018	Red Blooded	Ruby Adair	Episode: "Pilot"
2020–2022, 2024	Young Sheldon	June	Recurring role (seasons 3–5, 7)
2021	Christmas in Tune	Georgia	Television film
2022–2023	Big Sky	Sunny Barnes	Main role
2023	Reba McEntire's The Hammer	Judge Kim Wheeler	Television film
2024-Present	Happy's Place	Bobbie	Lead Role & Executive Producer

Theater
Year	Title	Role	Notes
2001	Annie Get Your Gun	Annie Oakley	
2006	South Pacific: In Concert from Carnegie Hall	Nellie Forbush	

== Publications ==
- McEntire, Reba (May 1, 1994). Reba: My Story. New York: Bantam Books. ISBN 978-0553096071.
- McEntire, Reba (April 13, 1999). Comfort from a Country Quilt: Finding New Inspiration and Strength from Old-Fashioned Values. New York: Bantam Books. ISBN 978-0-553-10794-4.
- McEntire, Reba (October 10, 2023). Not That Fancy: Simple Lessons on Living, Loving, Eating, and Dusting Off Your Boots. New York: Harper Celebrate. ISBN 978-1400238255.

== See also ==
- List of best-selling music artists in the United States
