= Secret of Giving: A Christmas Collection =

Studio album by Reba McEntire
- Released: September 21, 1999
- Recorded: 1999
- Studios: Starstruck Studios, East Iris Studios and Sound Stage Studios (Nashville, Tennessee)
- Genres: Christmas; country
- Length: 34:51
- Label: MCA
- Producers: David Malloy; Reba McEntire

Reba McEntire chronology
| If You See Him (1998) | Secret of Giving: A Christmas Collection (1999) | So Good Together (1999) |

Professional ratings
Review scores
| Source | Rating |
|---|---|
| Allmusic | 4/5 stars |

The Secret of Giving: A Christmas Collection is American country music singer Reba McEntire's twenty-third studio album, and second Christmas album, the follow-up to her 1987 album Merry Christmas to You. Released on September 21, 1999, the album features mostly new, original holiday tunes with only a couple of traditional favorites. The children featured on "The Angels Sang" are actually the class of her son Shelby who was in the third grade at the time. The album peaked at No. 10 on the Billboard country chart and is currently certified Gold by the RIAA. It has sold 940,000 copies as of December 2013 in the US, and over 1 million copies worldwide.

The album was followed by a CBS made-for-television movie also called Secret of Giving. The film starred McEntire and Thomas Ian Griffith, and aired on Thanksgiving night in 1999. It featured songs from the album as its soundtrack.

== Track listing ==
| No. | Title | Writer(s) | Length |
|---|---|---|---|
| 1. | "This Is My Prayer for You" | Tony Arata; Gary Scruggs | 3:40 |
| 2. | "I Saw Mommy Kissing Santa Claus" | Tommie Connor | 3:44 |
| 3. | "One Child, One Day" | Gerry House; Layng Martine Jr. | 3:31 |
| 4. | "Mary, Did You Know?" | Buddy Greene; Mark Lowry | 3:21 |
| 5. | "Up on the Housetop" | Benjamin Hanby | 2:07 |
| 6. | "The Angels Sang" | Helen Darling; Peggy Newman | 3:45 |
| 7. | "Santa Claus Is Coming Back to Town" | Roxie Dean; Sonny Tillis | 3:35 |
| 8. | "The Secret of Giving" | Rick Bowles; Sunny Russ | 3:55 |
| 9. | "This Christmas" | Bowles | 3:52 |
| 10. | "Til the Season Comes 'Round Again" | Randy Goodrum; John Barlow Jarvis | 3:34 |

== Personnel ==
Vocals

- Reba McEntire – lead vocals
- Joe Chemay – backing vocals
- Liana Manis – backing vocals
- Jimmy Nichols – backing vocals
- Summer Academy Third Grade Music Class – backing vocals (6)

Musicians

- Jimmy Nichols – keyboards
- Jeff King – electric guitar
- B. James Lowry – acoustic guitar
- Brent Mason – electric guitar
- Jerry McPherson – electric guitar
- Biff Watson – acoustic guitar
- Terry Crisp – steel guitar
- Paul Franklin – steel guitar
- Richard "Spady" Brannan – bass
- Glenn Worf – bass, upright bass
- Eddie Bayers – drums
- Paul Leim – drums
- Eric Darken – percussion
- Larry Franklin – fiddle
- Will Smith – autoharp
- Reba McEntire – arrangements (5)

Production

- David Malloy – producer
- Reba McEntire – producer
- Kevin Beamish – mixing, recording (1–6, 8, 10)
- Steve Marcantonio – recording (7)
- Derek Bason – additional recording, digital editing, recording (9)
- Daniel Kresco – mix assistant, additional recording assistant (1–8, 10), recording assistant (1–6, 8, 10)
- J.R. Rodriguez – additional recording assistant (1–8, 10), recording assistant (1–6, 8, 10)
- Alex Chan – additional recording assistant (1–8, 10), recording assistant (7)
- Patrick Murphy – recording assistant (9)
- Scott McCutcheon – additional recording assistant (9)
- Denny Purcell – mastering at Georgetown Masters (Nashville, Tennessee)
- Candle Burgess – production coordinator for David Malloy
- Carole Ann Mobley – production coordinator (9)
- Cindy Owen – art direction
- Karen Cronin – design
- Ron Davis – photography
- Sandi Spika – hairstylist, wardrobe
- Lynn Rogers – make-up
- Narvel Blackstock for Starstruck Entertainment – representative

== Chart performance ==
=== Album ===
| Chart (1999) | Peak position |
|---|---|
| U.S. Billboard Top Country Albums | 10 |
| U.S. Billboard 200 | 85 |
| U.S. Billboard Top Holiday Albums | 8 |

=== Charted songs ===
| Year | Single | US Country |
|---|---|---|
| 1999 | "I'll Be Home for Christmas" | 68 |
| 1999 | "Away in a Manger" | 73 |
| 2000 | "Secret of Giving" | 58 |
| 2000 | "I Saw Mommy Kissing Santa Claus" | 50 |

== Sales and certifications ==
| Region | Certification | Certified units/sales |
|---|---|---|
| United States (RIAA) | Gold | 500,000^{^} |
^{^} Shipments figures based on certification alone.
