= Rex Linn =

American actor (born 1956)

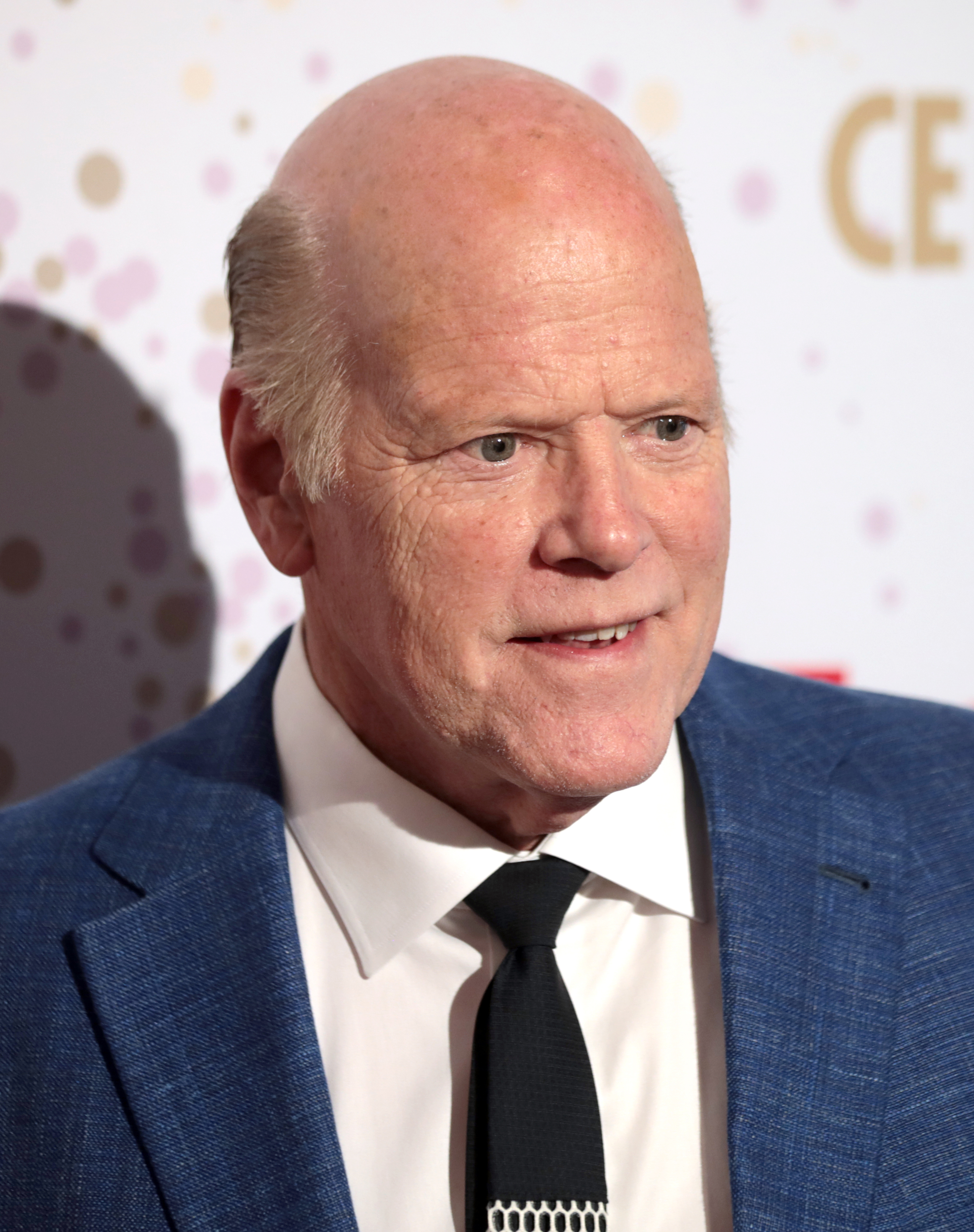
- Linn in 2022
- Born: Rex Maynard Linn; November 13, 1956 (age 69); Spearman, Texas, U.S.
- Occupation: Actor
- Years active: 1986–present
- Partner(s): Reba McEntire (2020–present)

Rex Maynard Linn (born November 13, 1956) is an American actor. He is best known domestically for playing the role of Sgt. Frank Tripp in the CBS drama CSI: Miami and more recently for playing Kevin Wachtell in the television series Better Call Saul. Internationally he is best known for playing Richard Travers in the 1993 action thriller film Cliffhanger. Since 2024, he has played the role of Emmett on the NBC sitcom Happy's Place.

== Early life and education ==
Linn was born on November 13, 1956, in Spearman, Texas. He lived in Spearman, Texas up until August 1969 when his parents relocated the family to Oklahoma City, Oklahoma, where his father practiced law. There he attended Heritage Hall School and later Casady School, an independent school affiliated with the Episcopal Church, and was employed part-time at the Oklahoma City Zoo. In November 1975, after seeing Jack Nicholson in One Flew Over the Cuckoo's Nest, Linn announced he was an actor.

In his high school production of Fiddler on the Roof, after Linn demolished a set during a number, his drama coach ordered him off the set and advised him to direct his energy to some other field of endeavor, ending Linn's high school acting career. He graduated from Oklahoma State University in 1980.

== Career ==
After graduation, Linn worked his way up to vice president of energy lending for the Lakeshore Bank, remaining with it until July 5, 1982, when the bank went insolvent. Linn was able to persuade a talent agent to take a chance on him and represent him in the Oklahoma market. At the same time, he accepted a job with an oil company, overseeing field operations in western Oklahoma, all the while auditioning for film and TV commercial parts. After shooting some commercials, he started landing small roles in various projects. During this time, he was given the opportunity to act in his first film, Dark Before Dawn, which was being produced by his best friend, Edward K. Gaylord II.

In 1989, he was cast in his first substantial role, as serial killer Floyd Epps, in Night Game, starring Roy Scheider. Following this film, and a part as the sheriff in a 1990 episode of The Young Riders (titled "Hard Time"), he decided it was time to head west. He began with small roles in theatrical films such as My Heroes Have Always Been Cowboys (1991), Thunderheart (1992), Sniper (1993), and Cliffhanger (1993), and guest shots on TV series including Northern Exposure, Raven, and The Adventures of Brisco County, Jr.. Since Cliffhanger, he has appeared in more than 35 films, with that number growing annually. Linn's most recent movie credit is in the political thriller, An Acceptable Loss (2018), where he starred alongside Jamie Lee Curtis.

On June 29, 1994, Linn was honored with a star on Carpenter's Square Theatre Walk of Fame in Oklahoma City. In 1994, he played a detective in Clear and Present Danger. He was a celebrity co-host of the Oklahoma Film Society Real to Reel 2005: "Classic Monster Mash". He has narrated three audio books, One Ranger (2005), A Man Called Cash (2005), and Missing Persons (2006), as well as a documentary for the Oklahoma University InvestEd program, Anatomy of Fraud – Catching a Con in Pottawatomie County in 2004. A similar documentary, Anatomy of a Fraud: Catching a Con in Logan County, also to be narrated by Linn, was described as being "in production" in 2005.

He currently is reported to be living in Sherman Oaks, California, with his dogs, Jack and Choctaw. Linn is a University of Texas Longhorns fan, even taking the day off from his CSI: Miami work to attend the 2005 Rose Bowl game when his beloved team played and won the 2005 national championship against the University of Southern California.

He is a former chairman of the Oklahoma City chapter of Ducks Unlimited. In 1986, he won the state duck-calling competition, and came fourth in the national competition.

Linn is an active supporter of children's charities and the arts. On May 12, 2007, he was a celebrity award presenter at the National Association of Police Organizations TOP COPS award ceremony in Washington, D.C.

He had recurring roles in several TV series such as Sgt. Frank Tripp on CSI: Miami, a role for which he was tricked into reading during the first season and which he held, as a series regular, until the end of the series. He had a minor role in the webisode series The Walking Dead: Torn Apart playing as Mike Palmer, a father hiding in a neighborhood in Georgia during a zombie apocalypse. It aired on AMC.com on October 3, 2011. From 2017 to 2024, he's played Principal Tom Peterson on Young Sheldon on CBS. In 2024, he began a recurring role in the situation comedy Happy's Place as Emmett, the love interest of the lead character played by his real-life fiancee Reba McEntire. In the spring of 2026, NBC announced that the show would be renewed for a third season.

== Personal life ==
Linn has been dating country singer and actress Reba McEntire since late 2020. They first met on the set of the Kenny Rogers vehicle The Gambler Returns: The Luck of the Draw (1991) and reconnected almost 30 years later when McEntire guest-starred as June on Young Sheldon. They became engaged in December 2024.

== Filmography ==
=== Film ===
Year	Title	Role	Notes
1989	Night Game	Epps	
1992	Thunderheart	FBI Agent #1	
1993	Sniper	Colonel Weymuth	Uncredited
1993	Cliffhanger	Richard Travers	
1994	Iron Will	Joe McPherson	
1994	Wyatt Earp	Frank McLaury	
1994	Clear and Present Danger	Washington Detective	
1994	Drop Zone	Bobby	
1995	Cutthroat Island	Mr. Blair	
1996	Tin Cup	Dewey	
1996	The Long Kiss Goodnight	Man in Bed	
1996	Ghosts of Mississippi	Martin Scott	
1997	Breakdown	Sheriff Boyd	
1997	The Postman	Mercer	
1998	The Odd Couple II	Jay Jay	
1998	Rush Hour	Agent Dan Whitney	
1999	Blast from the Past	Dave	
1999	Instinct	Guard Alan	
2001	Ghosts of Mars	Yared	
2002	The Salton Sea	Detective Bookman	
2003	The Hunted	Powell	
2003	Cheaper by the Dozen	Coach Bricker	
2004	After the Sunset	Agent Kowalski	
2005	The Zodiac	Jim Martinez	
2005	American Gun	Earl	
2006	Two Tickets to Paradise	Karl	
2006	Abominable	Farmer Hoss	
2008	Appaloosa	Sheriff Clyde Stringer	
2012	Atlas Shrugged: Part II	Kip Chalmer	
2012	Django Unchained	Tennessee Henry	
2013	Devil's Knot	Chief Inspector Gitchell	
2014	Zombeavers	Smyth	
2014	A Million Ways to Die in the West	Sheriff / Narrator	
2018	Under the Silver Lake	Manager	
2018	An Acceptable Loss	The President	

=== Television ===
Year	Title	Role	Notes
1987	Unsolved Mysteries	Terry Conner	1 episode
1988	Bonanza: The Next Generation	Cease	Television film
1989	Oklahoma Passage	Quantrill	Miniseries
1990	The Young Riders	Sheriff	1 episode
1990	Cop Rock	Deputy / Officer Cerruto	2 episodes
1991	Northern Exposure	Martin	1 episode
1991	Doogie Howser, M.D.	Billy	1 episode
1991	Guns of Paradise	Grant Page	Episode: "Unfinished Business"
1991	The Gambler Returns: The Luck of the Draw	Henry	Television film
1992	FBI: The Untold Stories	Christopher Wilder	1 episode
1994	The Adventures of Brisco County, Jr.	Mountain McClain	1 episode
1996–1997	3rd Rock from the Sun	Chuck / Webber	2 episodes
1997	Nash Bridges	Alan Tully	1 episode
1995–2000	JAG	Submarine Skipper, Lt. Mark "Falcon" Sokol	Recurring role
1998	Vengeance Unlimited	J.J.	1 episode
1999	The Jack Bull	Shelby Dykes	Television film
1999	Walker, Texas Ranger	Lester Stahl / Sheriff Leland Stahl	1 episode
1999	Y2K	Nuclear Plant Foreman	Television film
1999	Snoops	Jasper	1 episode
2000	The Pretender	Agent Ellis Talbot	1 episode
2000	Profiler	Agent Ellis Talbot	1 episode
2000–2001	The Fugitive	Karl Vasick	Recurring role
2001	Crossfire Trail	Luke Taggart	Television film
2002–2012	CSI: Miami	Sgt. Frank Tripp	Main role
2007	Saving Grace	Wiley	1 episode
2008	Trial by Fire	Chief Bill Berry	Television film
2014	The Lottery	General Alan Langdon	Recurring role
2015	State of Affairs	Senator Burke	4 episodes
2015	The Brink	Rear Admiral McBride	4 episodes
2015	Key & Peele	Detective	1 episode
2015–2016	Nashville	Bill Lexington	3 episodes
2016–2022	Better Call Saul	Kevin Wachtell	Recurring role
2016	The Ranch	Coach Shaw	1 episode
2017–2018	Lethal Weapon	Nathan Riggs	Recurring role
2017–2024	Young Sheldon	Principal Tom Petersen	Recurring role
2018	Waco	Dick DeGuerin	Miniseries
2018	The Kominsky Method	Ed	1 episode
2019	The L Word: Generation Q	Jeff Milner	2 episodes
2022	Roar	Sheriff	1 episode
2022–2023	Big Sky	Buck Barnes	Recurring role
2023	Reba McEntire's The Hammer	Bart Crawford	Television film
2024–present	Happy's Place	Emmett	Main role
2026	Georgie and Mandy's First Marriage	Principal Tom Petersen	Episode: "A New Scoreboard and a Horse's You Know What"
