= Happy's Place =

American sitcom

- Genre: Sitcom
- Created by: Julie Abbott & Kevin Abbott
- Starring: Reba McEntire; Belissa Escobedo; Melissa Peterman; Rex Linn; Pablo Castelblanco; Tokala Black Elk
- Music by: Doug Sisemore
- Opening theme: "You Belong at Happy's Place" by Reba McEntire
- Country of origin: United States
- Original language: English
- No. of seasons: 3
- No. of episodes: 41

Production
- Executive producers: Kevin Abbott; Mindy Schultheis; Michael Hanel; Reba McEntire; Pamela Fryman; Matt Berry; Julie Abbott; Franco E. Bario
- Cinematography: Gary Baum
- Editors: Kris Trexler; David Garver
- Running time: 21 minutes
- Production companies: RM Business Inc.; NestEgg Productions; Acme Productions; Universal Television

Original release
- Network: NBC
- Release: October 18, 2024 – present

Happy's Place is an American sitcom television series that premiered on October 18, 2024, on NBC. The series was created by Kevin and Julie Abbott, starring Reba McEntire, Melissa Peterman, Belissa Escobedo, and Rex Linn. It is about a woman who inherits a bar from her father after his death, then discovers she has a much younger half-sister who also has a share of the inheritance. In February 2025, the series was renewed for a second season which premiered on November 7, 2025. In February 2026, the series was renewed for a third season which premiered on October 23, 2026.

== Plot ==
Bobbie McAllister inherits a Knoxville, Tennessee tavern named "Happy's Place" from her father, who had the nickname Happy. She is surprised to learn she only owns half of the business, the other half owned by a young woman who is proven to be Bobbie's half-sister, Isabella, Happy's daughter from an affair he had with a woman named Maritza Sanchez. In view of their shared ownership of the tavern, Bobbie and Isabella begin running it together while adjusting to the fact that they really are family.

== Cast and characters ==
=== Main ===
- Reba McEntire as Bobbie, a woman who inherits half of a Knoxville, Tennessee tavern founded by her father, Happy, following his death, and Isabella's paternal half-sister
- Belissa Escobedo as Isabella, Bobbie's Mexican American paternal half-sister, who also inherits half of Happy's Place following Happy's death
- Melissa Peterman as Gabby, a bartender at Happy's Place. Peterman and McEntire also co-starred in Reba (2001–2007).
- Rex Linn as Emmett, the soft-spoken cook at Happy's Place and a longtime friend of Happy's
- Pablo Castelblanco as Steve, the germophobic, obsessive-compulsive Colombian-American accountant for Happy's Place
- Tokala Black Elk as Takoda, the Native American waiter at Happy's Place

=== Recurring ===
- Cheri Oteri as Monica (season 2), a health inspector who has a brief romantic relationship with Emmett

=== Notable guest stars ===
- Michael O'Neill as Jim Jackoway (season 1), Happy's lawyer who reveals to Bobbie and Isabella their familial relationship
- Steve Howey as Danny (season 1), Gabby's friend. Howey co-starred with McEntire and Peterman in Reba (2001–2007).
- Emma Kenney as Gracie (season 1), Bobbie's daughter. Gracie is a strong-willed military member who returns home on leave from her base in Qatar.
- Christopher Rich as Maverick (season 1), a tattoo artist that has suffered from a stroke. Rich also previously co-starred with McEntire and Peterman in Reba (2001–2007).
- Justina Machado as Maritza Sanchez (seasons 1, 3), Isabella's mother and Happy's former lover
- Carol Kane as Theresa (season 2)
- Christopher Lloyd as Clive (season 2)
- JoAnna Garcia Swisher as Kenzie (season 2), a local influencer and actress. Swisher co-starred with McEntire and Peterman in Reba (2001–2007).
- Jane Lynch as Val (seasons 2–3), Gabby's mother
- Eric Stonestreet as Dr. Russell Peabody III (season 2), a straight-shooting and unorthodox therapist
- James Denton as JB (season 3), a customer who takes a romantic interest in Bobbie. Denton also guest-starred twice in Reba (2001–2007).

== Episodes ==
=== Series overview ===
Season	Episodes	Originally released	
Season	Episodes	First released	Last released
1	18	October 18, 2024	March 21, 2025
2	18	November 7, 2025	April 24, 2026
3	TBA	October 23, 2026	TBA

=== Season 1 (2024–25) ===
No. overall	No. in season	Title	Directed by	Written by	Original release date	U.S. viewers (millions)
1	1	"Pilot"	Pamela Fryman	Teleplay by : Kevin Abbott; Story by : Julie Abbott & Kevin Abbott	October 18, 2024	4.03
Bobbie, already mourning the loss of her father, Happy, gets a further shock when she unexpectedly meets her half-sister Isabella and learns that Happy jointly left his tavern to the both of them, forcing the set-in-her-ways Bobbie and the cheery Isabella to navigate their new relationship as sisters. Isabella meets the eccentric staff of the tavern: Gabby, the talkative bartender; Steve, the nervous and germophobic accountant; Emmett, the soft-spoken cook and a longtime friend of Happy's; and Takoda, the well-meaning Native American waiter.
2	2	"Tapped Out"	Pamela Fryman	Kevin Abbott	October 25, 2024	3.49
Bobbie gets irritated by the changes Isabella wants to make around the tavern. Bobbie tries to get her lawyer to talk Isabella out of taking half ownership of the tavern but it backfires, forcing a confrontation between the two of them.
3	3	"Don't Sweat It"	Joanna Kerns	Gemma Baker	November 1, 2024	3.48
Bobbie offers to let Isabella move in with her when she struggles to find a place to live but Emmett warns her that Isabella is now a roommate instead of a guest and will try to change things. When his words prove to be true and Bobbie loses her cool, Isabella moves back out and Bobbie realizes she misses her.
4	4	"Fish Fry Monday"	Pamela Fryman	Matt Berry	November 8, 2024	3.48
Emmett wants to revive Fish Fry Mondays, a tradition where he used to go fishing on Sundays with Happy and fry up the catch the next day. Bobbie is less than excited when Emmett wants to take her along because it means leaving the tavern in the staff's hands until Emmett reveals the real reason he used to drag Happy along with him. Meanwhile, Isabella learns bartending from Gabby and Gabby gets drunk with power.
5	5	"Ladies' Night"	Victor Gonzalez	Erin Berry	November 15, 2024	2.95
When Gabby has her latest in a long string of heartbreaks, Bobbie and Isabella offer to help improve her dating profile. When that doesn't work, they throw a ladies' night at the tavern and are shocked when it inspires Gabby to have a baby.
6	6	"Happy's House"	Pamela Fryman	Matt Berry	November 22, 2024	3.07
Bobbie finally reluctantly decides to take Isabella to see Happy's house so she can get to know her father but it makes Bobbie question who Happy really was. Gabby tags along in search of a rumored valuable penny Happy had collected. Emmett and Steve spend their day off together at the tavern and unexpectedly find themselves bonding.
7	7	"Ho-Ho-Howey"	Pamela Fryman	Pat Bullard	December 6, 2024	3.39
When the tavern loses out on a big holiday party that was going to pay the staff's health insurance for the year, Gabby offers an alternative plan that involves her friend Danny (Steve Howey). There's one small catch, though: Danny thinks that Gabby is Bobbie and vice versa and that Isabella is French. Steve decides to amuse himself by pretending to be Emmett and Takoda is unnerved by all the dishonesty. Note: Steve Howey played Reba's son-in-law, Van Montgomery, on her earlier show Reba, and has a throwaway line near the end of the episode referring to that.
8	8	"Dear Jack"	Pamela Fryman	Brittany Miller	December 13, 2024	3.35
When Isabella wants to break up with her long distance boyfriend Jack, she struggles to figure out how to do it until Bobbie offers to write a Dear John letter to him. The letter backfires and inspires Jack to move to Tennessee to work things out with Isabella, who is even more reluctant to break up with Jack in person. Meanwhile, a local magazine article praises Emmett's cooking but Gabby is upset when she sees her name misspelled in the article.
9	9	"Emcee Squared"	Pamela Fryman	Erin Berry	January 3, 2025	3.36
Happy's Place prepares for their annual anniversary party where Happy would traditionally roast the regular patrons. Now that he is gone, Bobbie and Gabby each compete for the coveted emcee position. They respectively recruit Isabella and Steve to help them, leading the two to engage in a wager. If Bobbie wins, the germaphobic Steve has to kiss a dollar bill. If Gabby wins, Isabella has to go an entire day without bringing up her college education.
10	10	"The MacAllister Girls"	Pamela Fryman	Jon Haller	January 10, 2025	3.30
When Bobbie's daughter, Gracie (Emma Kenney) returns home from military deployment, Isabella tries her best to get along with her strong willed niece, which ends up bringing out some long simmering issues between mother and daughter as Isabella tries to strengthen family ties. Meanwhile, the rest of the staff compete to see who can give Gracie the best homecoming present.
11	11	"Heart of the Matter"	Robbie Countryman	Gemma Baker	January 17, 2025	3.45
12	12	"Baby Doll"	Pamela Fryman	Helen Fernandez	January 31, 2025	3.52
13	13	"Mama Drama"	Pamela Fryman	Brittany Miller	February 7, 2025	3.34
14	14	"Accountability"	Pamela Fryman	TJ Martell & Tommy Wright	February 14, 2025	3.13
15	15	"Sisters Ink"	Pamela Fryman	Brittany Miller & Erin Berry	February 21, 2025	3.11
16	16	"Whiskey Business"	Pamela Fryman	Eugene Garcia-Cross	March 7, 2025	3.25
17	17	"The Doctor Is Out"	Pamela Fryman	John D. Beck & Ron Hart	March 14, 2025	3.34
18	18	"Alarm Bells"	Pamela Fryman	Kevin Abbott	March 21, 2025	3.19

=== Season 2 (2025–26) ===
No. overall	No. in season	Title	Directed by	Written by	Original release date	U.S. viewers (millions)
19	1	"Promises, Promises"	Pamela Fryman	Kevin Abbott	November 7, 2025	3.01
20	2	"I've Got a Secret"	Pamela Fryman	Matt Berry	November 14, 2025	2.89
21	3	"Straw Man"	Pamela Fryman	Rob Ulin	November 21, 2025	2.86
22	4	"Testing Testing"	Pamela Fryman	Erin Berry	December 5, 2025	N/A
23	5	"Mouse in the House"	Pamela Fryman	Brittany Miller	December 12, 2025	N/A
24	6	"Izzy and the Professor"	Pamela Fryman	Rob Ulin	December 19, 2025	N/A
25	7	"An Accountant Prepares..."	Pamela Fryman	Eugene Garcia-Cross	January 16, 2026	N/A
Isabella wants Emmett to make a new appetizer that is plant based. Gabby insists that they tate test it first which Gabby and Takoda don't think that it is a good idea. Steve is having a slow day and Bobbie encourages him to do some acting for a commercial. Steve then makes Bobbie his acting parter.
26	8	"The Name Game"	Pamela Fryman	Jon Haller	January 23, 2026	N/A
27	9	"Silence Was Golden"	Pamela Fryman	Shelley Dennis	January 30, 2026	N/A
28	10	"No"	Pamela Fryman	TJ Martell & Tommy Wright	February 27, 2026	N/A
29	11	"Dart to the Heart"	Pamela Fryman	Lucy Musial	March 6, 2026	N/A
30	12	"Social Discontent"	Victor Gonzalez	Erin Berry	March 13, 2026	N/A
31	13	"A New Chapter"	Pamela Fryman	Pat Bullard	March 20, 2026	N/A
32	14	"Borrowin' Trouble"	Pamela Fryman	Jon Haller & Erin Berry	April 3, 2026	N/A
33	15	"Emotional Real Estate"	Pamela Fryman	Bill Mergner	April 10, 2026	N/A
34	16	"AI-AI-No"	Gloria Calderón Kellett	Matt Berry	April 17, 2026	N/A
35	17	"Everyone's a Critic"	Pamela Fryman	Eugene Garcia-Cross & Shelley Dennis	April 24, 2026	N/A
36	18	"Couples Counseling"	Pamela Fryman	Kevin Abbott	April 24, 2026	N/A

=== Season 3 (2026) ===
No. overall	No. in season	Title	Directed by	Written by	Original release date	U.S. viewers (millions)
37	1	"Office/Space"	Pamela Fryman	Jon Haller	October 23, 2026	N/A
Bobbie, with help from Takoda, converts an upstairs storage room into an office for Isabella, only to realize she misses having Isabella share her own office. Emmett and Bobbie navigate their agreement to give each other space. Gabby tries to create a signature mocktail for Isabella's speakeasy.
38	2	"Skeletons in the Closet"	Pamela Fryman	Erin Berry	October 30, 2026	TBD
Isabella's mother, Maritza, returns to Happy's Place to help with an ofrenda to honor the dead on el dia de los muertos (day of the dead), which has Isabella trying to learn if Happy cared less about his second family than his original one. Elsewhere, Gabby has a twist in store for her annual Halloween prank war with Emmett. Note: This episode was dedicated to Dolly Parton, which reads "In memory of Dolly Parton, we always love you".
39	3	"Full Gabby"	Gloria Calderón Kellett	Tucker Cawley	November 6, 2026	TBD
Having been displaced from their shared house due to a fire Gabby accidentally started, she and her mother, Val, attempt to heal old wounds. While Bobbie and Isabella initially joke about having to be their bartender's guardrails whenever she goes "full Gabby," Bobbie eventually stands up for Gabby when Val's condescending comments become too much. Elsewhere, Steve draws an unsuspecting Isabella into a new coping mechanism for his OCD.
40	4	"Love Birds"	Pamela Fryman	Kevin Abbott	November 13, 2026	TBD
A baby duck imprints on Steve and follows him everywhere, and Steve's handling of the situation sees him taking a big step in battling his germaphobia. Meanwhile, a handsome customer named JB (James Denton) takes a shine to Bobbie and asks her out, but Bobbie is reluctant to accept due to her cloudy relationship with Emmett.
41	5	"Don't Tell Bobbie"	Pamela Fryman	Matt Ross	November 20, 2026	TBD
42	6	"Not So Secret Santa"	TBA	TBA	December 4, 2026	TBD

== Production ==
=== Development ===
The series was created by Kevin Abbott, who serves as showrunner and executive producer. The other executive producers are Michael Hanel, Pamela Fryman, Mindy Schultheis and Julie Abbott. Reba McEntire is also an executive producer. On January 29, 2024, the series received a put pilot commitment by NBC. On May 7, 2024, the series had been given a series order and reveals the title as Happy's Place. Universal Television produces the series. On November 15, 2024, the series was given additional script orders, making the season total of 13 episodes. On November 21, 2024, the series added 5 episodes, giving it an 18-episode full first season order. On February 20, 2025, NBC renewed the series for a second season. On February 2, 2026, NBC renewed the series for a third season.

=== Casting ===
McEntire, who helped develop the pilot, plays the lead role of Bobbie. On March 18, 2024, Melissa Peterman and Belissa Escobedo were cast in main roles for the pilot. McEntire and Peterman previously were co-stars on the sitcom Reba. Announced later the same day, Rex Linn, Tokala Black Elk and Pablo Castelblanco were cast in main roles for the pilot.

=== Filming ===
Happy's Place is filmed at Universal Studios Hollywood in Universal City, California. However, it is set in Knoxville, Tennessee.

== Broadcast ==
Happy's Place premiered on October 18, 2024, on NBC. The second season premiered on November 7, 2025. The third season premiered on October 23, 2026.

In Canada, new episodes air one day earlier than the American airdate on CTV.

== Reception ==
=== Critical response ===
The review aggregator website Rotten Tomatoes reported a 73% approval rating with an average rating of 5.8/10, based on 11 critic reviews. Metacritic, which uses a weighted average, assigned a score of 60 out of 100 based on 8 critics, indicating "mixed or average" reviews.

=== Accolades ===
Reba McEntire as Bobbie for Happy's Place was nominated in the Favorite Female TV Star (Family) category for the 2025 Kids' Choice Awards.

=== Ratings ===
==== Season 1 ====
Viewership and ratings per episode of Happy's Place
No.	Title	Air date	Rating/share (18–49)	Viewers (millions)	DVR (18–49)	DVR viewers (millions)	Total (18–49)	Total viewers (millions)	Ref.
1	"Pilot"	October 18, 2024	0.4/5	4.03	0.2	1.47	0.5	5.50	
2	"Tapped Out"	October 25, 2024	0.3/4	3.49	0.1	1.50	0.4	5.00	
3	"Don't Sweat It"	November 1, 2024	0.3/4	3.48	0.1	1.32	0.4	4.79	
4	"Fish Fry Monday"	November 8, 2024	0.3/4	3.48	0.1	1.27	0.4	4.76	
5	"Ladies' Night"	November 15, 2024	0.2/4	2.95	0.2	1.25	0.4	4.20	
6	"Happy's House"	November 22, 2024	0.2/4	3.07	0.1	1.20	0.4	4.27	
7	"Ho-Ho-Howey"	December 6, 2024	0.4/5	3.39	0.1	1.24	0.5	4.63	
8	"Dear Jack"	December 13, 2024	0.3/4	3.35	0.1	1.15	0.4	4.50	
9	"Emcee Squared"	January 3, 2025	0.2/3	3.36	0.1	0.94	0.3	4.31	
10	"The MacAllister Girls"	January 10, 2025	0.3/3	3.30	0.1	1.20	0.4	4.42	
11	"Heart of the Matter"	January 17, 2025	0.2/3	3.45	0.1	1.21	0.3	4.67	
12	"Baby Doll"	January 31, 2025	0.3/5	3.52	0.1	1.08	0.4	4.61	
13	"Mama Drama"	February 7, 2025	0.3/4	3.34	0.1	1.17	0.4	4.50	
14	"Accountability"	February 14, 2025	0.3/4	3.13	0.1	1.08	0.4	4.20	
15	"Sisters Ink"	February 21, 2025	0.2/3	3.11	0.1	1.08	0.3	4.18	
16	"Whiskey Business"	March 7, 2025	0.3/4	3.25	0.1	1.04	0.4	4.29	
17	"The Doctor Is Out"	March 14, 2025	0.3/5	3.34	0.1	1.03	0.4	4.37	
18	"Alarm Bells"	March 21, 2025	0.2/3	3.19	0.1	1.12	0.3	4.31	

==== Season 2 ====
Viewership and ratings per episode of Happy's Place
No.	Title	Air date	Rating/share (18–49)	Viewers (millions)	DVR (18–49)	DVR viewers (millions)	Total (18–49)	Total viewers (millions)	Ref.
1	"Promises, Promises"	November 7, 2025	0.3/4	3.01	0.1	0.97	0.4	3.98	
2	"I've Got a Secret"	November 14, 2025	0.2/4	2.89	TBD	TBD	TBD	TBD	
3	"Straw Man"	November 21, 2025	0.2/4	2.86	TBD	TBD	TBD	TBD	
