= Reba McEntire videography =

Reba McEntire discography
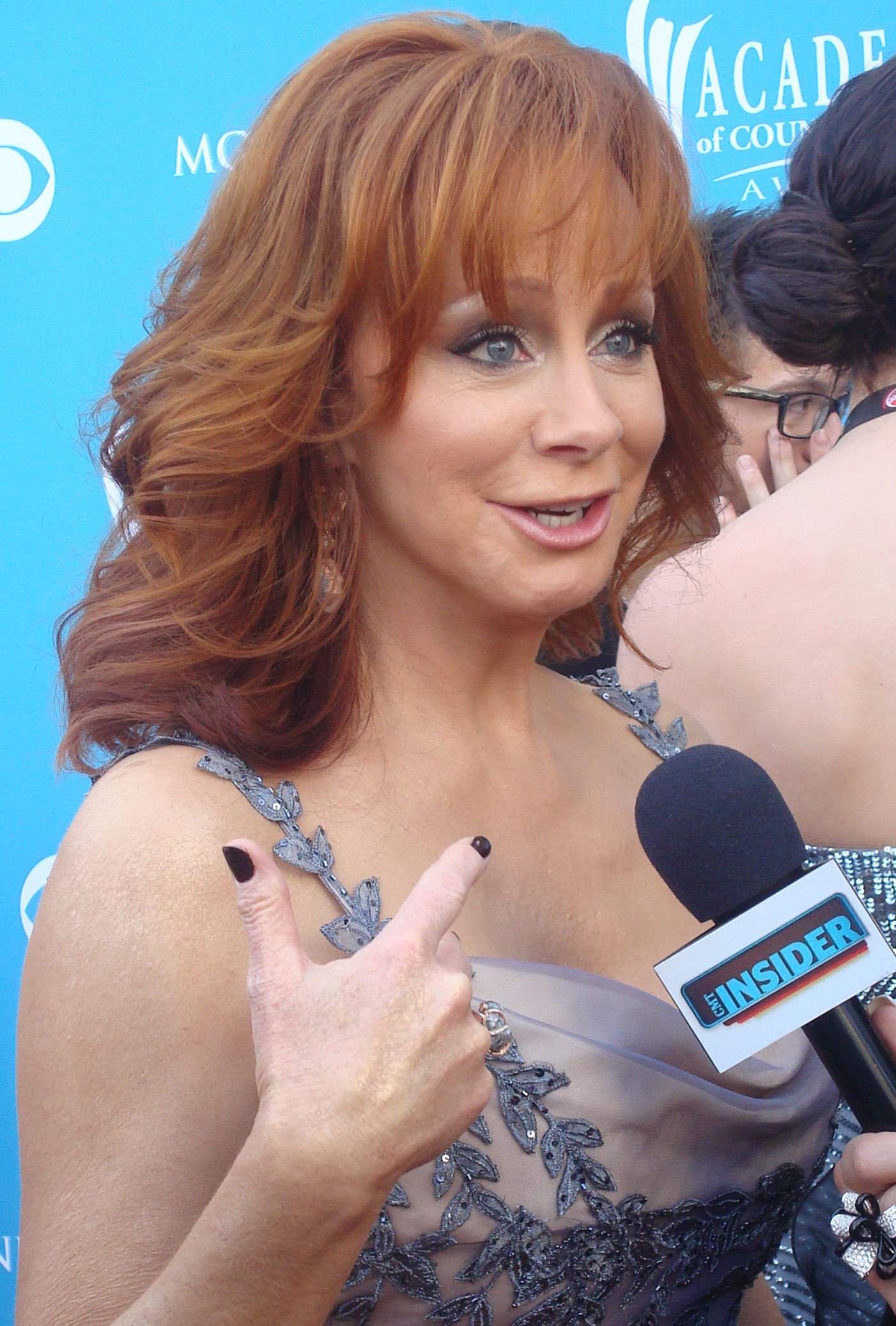
- Video albums: 9
- Music videos: 57

American country singer Reba McEntire has appeared in 55 music videos and has released 9 video albums.

== Music videos ==
Title	Year	Director
"Whoever's in New England"	1986	Jon Small/Jeff Schock
"What Am I Gonna Do About You"	1986	Jon Small
"The Last One to Know"	1987	Jeff Schock
"Sunday Kind of Love"	1988	Jack Cole
"I Know How He Feels"	1988	Narvel Blackstock
"Cathy's Clown"	1989	Jon Small
"You Lie"	1990	Peter Israelson
"Rumor Has It"	1991	Jack Cole
"Fancy"	1991	Jack Cole
"For My Broken Heart"	1991	Jack Cole
"Is There Life Out There"	1992	Jack Cole
"The Night the Lights Went Out in Georgia"	1992	Jack Cole
"Take It Back"	1993	Jon Small
"The Heart Won't Lie" (with Vince Gill)	1993	Jon Small
"It's Your Call"	1993	Jon Small
"Does He Love You" (with Linda Davis)	1993	Jon Small
"If I Had Only Known"	1994	Jon Small
"Why Haven't I Heard From You"	1994	Jon Small
"Amazing Grace" (The Maverick Choir)	1994	Gil Bettman
"She Thinks His Name Was John"	1994	Ken Ehrlich
"Till You Love Me"	1995	Jon Small
"And Still"	1995	Jack Cole
"On My Own" (with Linda Davis, Martina McBride & Trisha Yearwood)	1995	Dominic Orlando
"Starting Over Again"	1996	Bud Schaetzle
"The Fear of Being Alone"	1996	Dominic Orlando
"I'd Rather Ride Around with You"	1997	Gerry Wenner
"What If It's You"	1997	Gerry Wenner
"What If"	1997	John Lloyd Miller
"If You See Him/If You See Her" (with Brooks & Dunn)	1998	Deaton Flanigen
"Forever Love"	1998	Gerry Wenner
"What Do You Say"	1999	Deaton Flanigen
"I'll Be"	2000	Deaton Flanigen
"Sweet Music Man"	2002	Brent Hedgecock
"I'm Gonna Take That Mountain"	2003	Nancy Bardawil
"Somebody"	2004	Trey Fanjoy
"He Gets That From Me"	2004	Trey Fanjoy
"You're Gonna Be (Always Loved By Me)"	2005	Peter Zavadil
"Love Needs a Holiday"	2006	Trey Fanjoy
"Because of You" (with Kelly Clarkson)	2007	Roman White
"Every Other Weekend"	2008	Roman White
"Cowgirls Don't Cry" (with Brooks & Dunn)	2008	Deaton Flanigen
"Strange"	2009	Trey Fanjoy
"Consider Me Gone"	2009	Trey Fanjoy
"I Keep on Loving You"	2010	Michael Salomon
"If I Were a Boy"	2010	Eric Welch
"Turn on the Radio"	2010	Randee St. Nicholas
"When You Have a Child"	2010	Justin Key
"If I Were a Boy"	2011	Peter Zavadil
"When Love Gets a Hold of You"	2011	Glenn Weiss
"Somebody's Chelsea"	2011	Trey Fanjoy
"The Choice" (Billy Gilman & Friends)	2012	Sean Thomas
"Silent Night" (with Kelly Clarkson & Trisha Yearwood)	2013	Hamish Hamilton
"Pray for Peace"	2014	Justin McIntosh
"Going Out Like That"	2015	TK McKamy
"Just Like Them Horses"	2016	Reba McEntire/Justin McIntosh
"Forever Country" (Artists of Then, Now & Forever)	2016	Joseph Kahn
"Back to God"	2017	Mason Dixon
"Somehow You Do"	2021	Jon Avnet
"Dear Rodeo" (Cody Johnson)	2021	Shaun Silva
"Does He Love You" (featuring Dolly Parton)	2021	Dano Cerny
"Seven Minutes in Heaven"	2023	Justin Key
"I Can't"	2024	Dano Cerny

== Video albums ==
List of video albums, showing year released and album name
Title	Album details	Certifications
Reba	Released: 1989; Label: MCA; Formats: VHS, Laserdisc	RIAA: Gold
Reba in Concert	Released: 1991; Label: MCA; Formats: VHS, Laserdisc	RIAA: Platinum
For My Broken Heart	Released: 1992; Label: MCA; Formats: VHS, Laserdisc	RIAA: Platinum
Greatest Hits	Released: 1993; Label: MCA; Formats: VHS, Laserdisc	RIAA: Platinum
Reba: Live	Released: 1995; Label: MCA; Formats: VHS, Laserdisc	RIAA: Platinum
Celebrating 20 Years	Released: 1996; Label: MCA; Formats: VHS	RIAA: Gold
Video Gold I	Released: November 21, 2006; Label: MCA Nashville; Formats: DVD	
Video Gold II	Released: November 21, 2006; Label: MCA Nashville; Formats: DVD	
CMT Invitation Only: Reba	Released: February 9, 2010; Label: Valory, Starstruck; Formats: DVD	
