= Reba McEntire's The Hammer =

2023 American television film

- Written by: Sanford Golden; Karen Wyscarver
- Directed by: Jeff Beesley
- Starring: Reba McEntire; Kay Shioma Metchie; Rex Linn; Melissa Peterman
- Music by: Matthew Rogers
- Country of origin: United States
- Original language: English

Production
- Producers: Reba McEntire; Stan Spry; Eric Scott Woods; Anthony Fankhauser; Graem Luis
- Cinematography: Eduardo Ramirez Gonzalez
- Editor: Jason Dale
- Production companies: Pahrump Pictures; The Cartel

Original release
- Network: Lifetime
- Release: January 7, 2023

Reba McEntire's The Hammer is a 2023 American television film starring Reba McEntire as Kim Wheeler, the newly appointed Judge of the 5th Judicial District of Nevada. The film is inspired by the life of Nevada state court judge Kim Wanker, one of the last traveling circuit judges in the U.S. The film premiered on January 7, 2023, on Lifetime.

== Plot ==
A newly appointed judge (McEntire) must grapple with the personalities of a small town.

== Cast ==
- Reba McEntire as Kim Wheeler
- Kay Shioma Metchie as Vicky
- Rex Linn as Bart Crawford
- Melissa Peterman as Kris
- Jill Morrison as Jo
- Garry Chalk as Judge Carpenter
- Primo Allon as Vance
- Kate Ely as Eileen
- Matty Finochio as Ellis Dinkins
- Matt Kennedy as Deputy Wayne
- Garfield Wilson as Goodlander
- Toby Marks as Angel
- Amy Reid as Dottie
- John C. MacDonald as Leo Stevenson
- Candyce Weir as Charlene
- Vanesa Tomasino as Melba
- Nikki Bryce as Mae
- Aaron Paul Stewart as Langdon
- Alan Colodey as Virgil
- Bruce Crawford as Willis
- Hazel Bartlett-Sias as Young Kim
- David Procter as Judge Brewer
- Angel Charline Kanyamuneza as Drug Rehab Girl

== Production ==
In June 2022, it was reported that Reba McEntire will star and also serve as an executive producer on the new Lifetime movie The Hammer. The project marks McEntire's reunion with her Reba co-star Melissa Peterman. Also was cast McEntire's real-life boyfriend, Rex Linn, and Kay Shioma Metchie. McEntire and Linn met in 1991 when they worked on the television movie The Gambler Returns: The Luck of the Draw (1991).

=== Background ===
The film is based on the life of Kim Wanker, who was appointed by Nevada governor Brian Sandoval in 2011 to the Fifth Judicial District Court, Department 1, as the first rural female District Judge in Nevada. Wanker was in frequent contact by phone and text with McEntire during production, but conflicting schedules prohibited the two from meeting prior to the film's premiere. As a result, both Wanker and McEntire hosted separate premiere parties.
