= All the Women I Am Tour =

2011–12 concert tour by Reba McEntire

- Tour by Reba McEntire
- Promotional poster for tour
- Associated album: All the Women I Am
- Start date: September 1, 2011
- End date: March 14, 2012
- Legs: 2
- No. of shows: 35 in North America; 4 in Europe; 39 Total

Reba McEntire concert chronology
- Twang Tour (2010-11); All the Women I Am Tour (2011-12)

The All the Women I Am Tour was a concert tour headlined by country singer Reba McEntire, who visited Canada, the United States, and the United Kingdom in support of her album All the Women I Am. It was McEntire's first solo tour since the Key to Your Heart Tour in 2007.

== Background ==
McEntire announced the tour during a press conference for the Country Music Hall of Fame. She states after being on the road with Strait and Womack for over a year, she and her team have designed a new show with new staging, etc. Opening the concerts for the singer will be fellow country musicians; The Band Perry, Steel Magnolia and Edens Edge. Further details for the tour were available through McEntire's Twitter account and official website. With the tour announcement, McEntire was named the biggest female box office draw in country music. She has sold over nine million tickets and earned over $270 million in ticket sales.

To introduce the tour, McEntire says:

"I am very excited about the fall tour. We are designing new production and staging. I'm looking forward to touring with The Band Perry, Steel Magnolia and Edens Edge. It will be a night of great music and I'm planning on having a blast."

== Opening act ==
- Victoria Banks (Canada)
- The JaneDear Girls (Bangor)
- Shana Stack Band (Gilford)
- The Band Perry (United States)
- Edens Edge (United States) (select dates)
- Steel Magnolia (United States) (select dates)

== Setlist ==
September 26, 2011—Halifax Metro Centre—Halifax, Canada
1. "Can't Even Get the Blues"
2. "The Fear of Being Alone"
3. "Strange"
4. "The Night the Lights Went Out in Georgia"
5. "Somebody's Chelsea"
6. "Is There Life Out There"
7. "The Greatest Man I Never Knew"
8. "Nothing to Lose"
9. "Somebody" / "Till You Love Me" / "You Lie" / "Fallin' Out of Love" / "I Keep On Loving You" / "And Still" / "Whoever's in New England"
10. "Does He Love You"
11. "I Want a Cowboy"
12. "Consider Me Gone"
13. "Why Haven't I Heard from You"
14. "Because of You"
15. "I'm a Survivor"
16. "Turn On the Radio"

Encore

17. "Fancy"
October 6, 2011—iWireless Center—Moline, Illinois
1. "All the Women I Am"
2. "Strange"
3. "The Fear of Being Alone"
4. "Somebody's Chelsea"
5. "The Night the Lights Went Out in Georgia"
6. "Is There Life Out There"
7. "Somebody" / "Till You Love Me" / "You Lie / "Fallin' Out of Love" / "I Keep On Loving You" / "And Still" / "Whoever's in New England"
8. "I Want a Cowboy"
9. "The Greatest Man I Never Knew"
10. "Nothing to Lose"
11. "How Blue" / "The Heart Is a Lonely Hunter" / "Walk On" / "I'd Rather Ride Around with You" / "Can't Even Get the Blues"
12. "Does He Love You" (performed with Kimberly Perry)
13. "Consider Me Gone"
14. "I'm a Survivor"
15. "Because of You"
16. "Take It Back"
17. "Why Haven't I Heard from You"
18. "Turn On the Radio"

Encore

19. "Fancy"
20. "Back in the U.S.A." (performed with The Band Perry and Edens Edge)

Notes

- During her concert at the Chaifetz Arena, McEntire performed "Rolling in the Deep" in lieu of "Back in the U.S.A".
- "Back in the U.S.A. was nor performed at the Mohegan Sun Arena in Uncasville.

== Tour dates ==
Date	City	Country	Venue
North America
September 1, 2011^{[A]}	Fort McMurray	Canada	MacDonald Island Park
September 4, 2011^{[B]}	Canfield	United States	Mahoning County Fairgrounds Grandstand
September 17, 2011	Bangor	United States	Bangor Waterfront Pavilion
September 22, 2011	Niagara Falls	Canada	Avalon Ballroom Theatre
September 23, 2011	Niagara Falls	Canada	Avalon Ballroom Theatre
September 24, 2011	Gilford	United States	Meadowbrook U.S. Cellular Pavilion
September 26, 2011	Halifax	Canada	Halifax Metro Centre
September 29, 2011	St. John's	Canada	Mile One Centre
September 30, 2011	St. John's	Canada	Mile One Centre
October 2, 2011^{[C]}	West Springfield	United States	Comcast Arena Stage
October 6, 2011	Moline	United States	iWireless Center
October 7, 2011	Bloomington	United States	U.S. Cellular Coliseum
October 8, 2011^{[D]}	Maryville	United States	Theatre in the Park
October 13, 2011	Green Bay	United States	Resch Center
October 14, 2011	Fort Wayne	United States	Allen County War Memorial Coliseum
October 15, 2011	Huntington	United States	Big Sandy Superstore Arena
October 20, 2011	Bozeman	United States	Worthington Arena
October 21, 2011	Casper	United States	Casper Events Center
October 22, 2011	Bismarck	United States	Bismarck Civic Center
October 27, 2011	Sioux City	United States	Gateway Arena
October 28, 2011	St. Louis	United States	Chaifetz Arena
October 29, 2011	Kansas City	United States	Sprint Center
November 3, 2011	Omaha	United States	CenturyLink Center Arena
November 4, 2011	Tulsa	United States	BOK Center
November 5, 2011	Wichita	United States	Intrust Bank Arena
November 10, 2011	Grand Rapids	United States	Van Andel Arena
November 11, 2011	Evansville	United States	Ford Center
November 12, 2011	Duluth	United States	Arena at Gwinnett Center
November 17, 2011	Lafayette	United States	Cajundome
November 18, 2011	Biloxi	United States	Mississippi Coast Coliseum
November 19, 2011	Tupelo	United States	BancorpSouth Arena
January 12, 2012	Uncasville	United States	Mohegan Sun Arena
Europe
February 26, 2012^{[E]}	London	England	Wembley Arena
February 29, 2012^{[E]}	Belfast	Northern Ireland	Odyssey Arena
March 2, 2012^{[E]}	Zürich	Switzerland	Hallenstadion
March 4, 2012^{[E]}	Mannheim	Germany	SAP Arena
North America
March 9, 2012^{[F]}	Houston	United States	Reliant Stadium
March 11, 2012^{[G]}	Plant City	United States	Wish Farms Soundstage
March 14, 2012	Johnstown	United States	Cambria County War Memorial Arena

Festivals and other miscellaneous performances

^{A} This concert is a part of the "SummersEND Country Music Jubilee"
^{B} This concert is a part of the "Canfield Fair"
^{C} This concert is a part of "The Big E"

^{D} This concert is a part of the "Foothills Fall Festival"
^{E} These concerts are a part of the "International Festival of Country Music"
^{F} This concert is a part of the "Houston Livestock Show and Rodeo"
^{G} This concert is a part of the "Florida Strawberry Festival"

=== Box office score data ===
Venue	City	Tickets sold / available	Gross revenue
Meadowbrook U.S. Cellular Pavilion	Gilford	2,702 / 5,496 (49%)	$208,313
Van Andel Arena	Grand Rapids	5,066 / 8,772 (57%)	$301,110
Mohegan Sun Arena	Uncasville	4,541 / 5,011 (91%)	$271,005

== Broadcasts and recordings ==
The concert at the Cajundome in Lafayette, Louisiana, was filmed for an upcoming television special. A newsletter was sent out to McEntire's fan club announcing a competition for 300 fans to attend the taping. According to Erin Burr of Big Machine Records, the airdate and station will be announced at a later date. It is McEntire's first concert taping since 1995.
