= Merry Christmas to You =

Studio album by Reba McEntire
- Released: November 27, 1987
- Studios: Emerald Sound Studios, Sound Stage Studios, Back Stage Studio, Sixteenth Avenue Sound and Masterfonics (Nashville, Tennessee); The Castle (Franklin, Tennessee)
- Genre: Country
- Length: 34:02
- Label: MCA Nashville
- Producers: Tony Brown; Jimmy Bowen; Reba McEntire

Reba McEntire chronology
The Last One to Know (1987)	Merry Christmas to You (1987)	Reba (1988)

Alternative cover
- 1995 reissue cover

Singles from Merry Christmas to You
- 1. "O Holy Night" Released: December 1987; 2. "The Christmas Song (Chestnuts Roasting on an Open Fire)" Released: December 1987; 3. "The Christmas Guest" Released: December 1988; 4. "I'll Be Home for Christmas" Released: December 1988

Merry Christmas to You is the thirteenth studio album and first Christmas album by American country music singer Reba McEntire, with most of the tunes being McEntire's renditions of very familiar traditional Christmas fare. It was released on November 27, 1987, by MCA Nashville. It was her last album to bear her surname on the front cover until she released Sing It Now: Songs of Faith & Hope in 2017. Songs from the album would not chart until ten and twelve years after its release.

== Track listing ==
No.	Title	Writer(s)	Length
1.	"Away in a Manger"	James R. Murray	2:26
2.	"On This Day"	Michael P. Heeney; David Scarlet	4:03
3.	"O Holy Night"	Adolphe Adam; John Sullivan Dwight	3:54
4.	"The Christmas Guest"	Grandpa Jones; Ramona Jones; Bill Walker	5:23
5.	"Silent Night"	Franz Gruber; Josef Mohr	3:36
6.	"Happy Birthday Jesus (I'll Open This One for You)"	Traditional	2:33
7.	"White Christmas"	Irving Berlin	3:02
8.	"I'll Be Home for Christmas"	Kim Gannon; Walter Kent; Buck Ram	3:16
9.	"A Christmas Letter"	John Greenebaum; Paul Nelson; Gene Nelson	3:11
10.	"The Christmas Song (Chestnuts Roasting on an Open Fire)"	Mel Tormé; Bob Wells	3:26

Professional ratings
Review scores
Source	Rating
Allmusic	2.5/5 stars

== Personnel ==
=== Musicians ===
- Reba McEntire – vocals, arrangements (1, 3, 5, 6)
- John Barlow Jarvis – keyboards (1, 2)
- Donny Howard – acoustic piano (3–10)
- Mac McAnally – acoustic guitar (1, 2)
- Larry Byrom – electric guitar (1, 2)
- Billy Joe Walker Jr. – electric guitar (1, 2)
- Bill Cooley – acoustic guitar (3–10), electric guitars (3–10)
- Leigh Reynolds – acoustic guitar (3–10)
- Tom Brumley – steel guitar (1, 2)
- Donnie LaValley – steel guitar (3–10)
- Emory Gordy Jr. – bass (1, 2)
- Roger Wills – bass (3–10)
- Matt Betton – drums (1, 2)
- Steve Short – drums (3–10)
- Farrell Morris – chimes (1, 2), vibraphone (1, 2)
- Mark O'Connor – fiddle (1, 2)
- Ricky Solomon – fiddle (3–10)

Background vocalists

- Vince Gill – backing vocals (2)
- Suzy Hoskins – backing vocals (3–10)
- Reba McEntire – backing vocals (3–10)
- Leigh Reynolds –backing vocals (3–10)

=== Production ===
- Tony Brown – producer (1, 2)
- Jimmy Bowen – producer (3–10)
- Reba McEntire – producer (3–10)
- Steve Tillisch – mixing, recording engineer (1, 2), overdub recording (3–10)
- Chuck Ainlay – mixing (1, 2)
- Ron Treat – recording engineer (3–10)
- Bob Bullock – mixing (3–10), overdub recording (3–10)
- Willie Pevear – overdub recording (3–10)
- Mark J. Coddington – second engineer (3–10)
- Tim Kish – second engineer (3–10)
- Russ Martin – second engineer (3–10)
- Marty Williams – second engineer (3–10)
- Milan Bogdan – digital editing
- Glenn Meadows – mastering at Masterfonics (Nashville, Tennessee)
- Jesse Noble – project coordinator
- Simon Levy – art direction
- Katherine DeVault – design
- Jim "Señior" McGuire – photography
- Ann Payne – styling
- J. Jacklyn Furriers – fur
- Bill Carter – management

== Charts ==
=== Album ===
Chart (1987)	Peak position
U.S. Billboard Top Country Albums	72
U.S. Billboard Top Holiday Albums	20

=== Singles ===
Year	Single	Peak positions
Year	Single	US Country
1997	"The Christmas Song (Chestnuts Roasting on an Open Fire)"	63
1999	"I'll Be Home for Christmas"	68
1999	"Away in a Manger"	73

== Certifications and sales ==
Region	Certification	Certified units/sales
United States (RIAA)	2× Platinum	2,000,000^{^}
^{^} Shipments figures based on certification alone.
