= Country Radio Broadcasters =

Country Radio Broadcasters (CRB) is a non-profit organization based in Nashville, Tennessee created to promote the growth of country radio and the country music industry through educational programs.

Its annual Country Radio Seminar serves as "market week" for the country music industry, where new artists and music that will be released throughout the year are showcased to radio’s decision makers. All major radio station groups, both country music trade organizations (the Country Music Association and the Academy of Country Music), music licensing organizations BMI, ASCAP and SESAC, and independent industry professionals are sponsors or attendees.

== Seminar ==
The Country Radio Seminar (CRS) was founded in 1970 by Tom McEntee, editor of the Country Music Survey, as the Country Music Survey Radio Seminar. Each spring this convention and trade show brings together nearly 1,000 delegates from country radio with 1,000 music industry professionals for three days in Nashville.

Radio attendees include program directors, general managers, promotion managers, sales executives and air talent. It is the third-largest annual country music event held in Nashville (behind the Country Music Association Awards and the CMA’s Music Festival), and the largest event for country industry professionals held in the city. The city of Nashville and Davidson County declare it "Country Radio Week" in Nashville in recognition of country radio’s role in promoting Nashville tourism, and as the primary medium for the promotion of country music, which employs many Nashville residents.

In 1985, the seminar switched to long-form sessions due to the "sophistication of the country [music] marketplace." In 1985, its president was Mike Oatman.

In 1998, CRB moved the seminar from the Gaylord Opryland Resort & Convention Center to the Nashville Convention Center.

Since the founding of the Country Radio Seminar in 1970, the number of country radio stations in the US has grown from about 600 to over 2,000, according to research by the Country Music Association.
