= I'm Yours (Linda Davis album) =

Compilation album by Linda Davis
- Released: November 3, 1998
- Genre: Country
- Length: 47:31
- Label: DreamWorks
- Producer: Jimmy Bowen; Linda Davis; Byron Gallimore; John Guess; Julian King; James Stroud; Randy Travis; Wally Wilson

Linda Davis chronology
Some Things Are Meant to Be (1996)	I'm Yours (1998)	Family Christmas (2003)

Professional ratings
Review scores
Source	Rating
AllMusic	4/5 stars

I'm Yours is the fifth studio album by American country music artist Linda Davis. Her only album for DreamWorks Records, it was released in 1998. The album comprises five new songs and nine previously released songs. Of its new recordings, the title track and "From the Inside Out" were all released as singles, charting on the Billboard country charts between 1998 and early 1999.

== Content ==
Seven of the album's songs are the original recordings of songs from Davis's older albums. Chronologically, these songs are "Three Way Tie" (from In a Different Light, 1991); "Company Time," "Love Didn't Do It," and "In Pictures" (from Shoot for the Moon, 1994); "Some Things Are Meant to Be," "A Love Story in the Making," and "What Do I Know" (from Some Things Are Meant to Be, 1996). All of these were singles for Davis, except for "In Pictures" and "What Do I Know", which were both singles for other artists: the former by Alabama from its 1995 album of the same name, and the latter by Ricochet from its 1996 self-titled debut. "I Wanna Remember This" was included on the soundtrack to the 1998 film Black Dog and "Make It Through", a duet with Randy Travis, was included on the soundtrack to the 1998 film The Prince of Egypt.

Of the five new tracks, two charted on the Billboard country charts between late 1998 and early 1999. The first to do so was the title track at number 38 and "From the Inside Out" at number 60.

== Track listing ==
No.	Title	Writer(s)	Length
1.	"I'm Yours"	Phillip Coleman, Carolyn Dawn Johnson	3:28
2.	"From the Inside Out"	Marc Beeson, Angela Kaset	3:15
3.	"A Love Story in the Making"	Craig Wiseman, Al Anderson	3:40
4.	"After a Kiss"	Steven Dale Jones, Johnson	3:20
5.	"Company Time"	Mac McAnally	3:20
6.	"I Wanna Remember This"	Jennifer Kimball, Annie Roboff	3:43
7.	"Three Way Tie"	Mary Beth Anderson, Carol Grace Anderson, Lisa Silver	3:23
8.	"I Took the Torch Out of His Old Flame"	Tim Ryan Rouillier, Leslie Satcher	3:06
9.	"Love Didn't Do It"	Jones, Bobby Tomberlin	2:43
10.	"Through the Cracks"	Jones, Lee Thomas Miller	3:44
11.	"In Pictures""	Joe Doyle, Bobby Boyd	3:07
12.	"What Do I Know"	Cathy Majeski, Sunny Russ, Stephony Smith	3:27
13.	"Some Things Are Meant to Be"	Michael Garvin, Gordon Payne	3:20
14.	"Make It Through" (duet with Randy Travis)	Tim Mensy, Skip Ewing	3:55

== Personnel ==
As listed in liner notes.

- Charlie Anderson – bass guitar
- Michael Black – background vocals
- Mike Brignardello – bass guitar
- Mark Casstevens – acoustic guitar, mandolin
- Joe Chemay – bass guitar
- Terry Crisp – steel guitar, Dobro
- Linda Davis – lead vocals, background vocals
- Jerry Douglas – Dobro
- Stuart Duncan – fiddle, mandolin
- Skip Ewing – acoustic guitar
- Molly Felder – background vocals
- Larry Franklin – fiddle, mandolin
- Paul Franklin – steel guitar
- Steve Gibson – electric guitar
- Vicki Hampton – background vocals
- Scotty Hawkins – drums
- Aubrey Haynie – fiddle, mandolin
- John Hobbs – piano, organ
- Paul Hollowell – piano, organ
- Dann Huff – electric guitar
- John Barlow Jarvis – piano, organ
- Michael Landau – electric guitar
- Paul Leim – drums
- Chris Leuzinger – electric guitar
- Rick Marotta – drums
- Brent Mason – electric guitar
- Mac McAnally – background vocals
- Terry McMillan – percussion
- Michael Mellet – background vocals
- Steve Nathan – piano, organ
- Don Potter – acoustic guitar
- Gary Prim – piano, organ
- John Robinson – drums
- Chris Rodriguez – background vocals
- John Wesley Ryles – background vocals
- Lang Scott – background vocals
- Randy Scruggs – acoustic guitar
- Lisa Silver – background vocals
- Doug Sizemore – piano, organ
- Neil Steubenhaus – bass guitar
- Harry Stinson – background vocals
- Biff Watson – acoustic guitar
- Kent Wells – electric guitar, acoustic guitar
- Lonnie Wilson – drums

Strings arranged and conducted by Steve Dorff.

== Production ==
- Jimmy Bowen and Linda Davis – track 7
- Byron Gallimore, James Stroud and Randy Travis – track 14
- John Guess – track 3, 5, 9, 11–13
- Julian King and James Stroud – tracks 1, 2, 4, 8, 10
- Wally Wilson and James Stroud – track 6

== Chart performance ==
Chart (1998)	Peak position
U.S. Billboard Top Country Albums	61
