= Live! One Night Only =

1998 live album by Patti LaBelle

Live album by Patti LaBelle
- Released: September 22, 1998
- Recorded: June 2–3, 1998
- Venue: Hammerstein Ballroom, Manhattan Center, New York City
- Length: 1:33:33
- Label: MCA
- Producer: Arif Mardin, Armstead Edwards

Patti LaBelle chronology
Flame (1997)	Live! One Night Only (1998)	When a Woman Loves (2000)

Live! One Night Only is a live album by Patti LaBelle, released in September 1998 through the record label MCA. The album earned LaBelle the Grammy Award for Best Traditional R&B Vocal Performance. The album was recorded in New York at the Hammerstein Ballroom on June 2, 1998.

== Track listing ==
Disc 1

1. "I Believe" (Ervin Drake, Irvin Graham, Jimmy Shirl, Al Stillman) – 3:55
2. "When You Talk About Love" (Harris, Lewis, Ann Nesby, James "Big Jim" Wright) – 4:59
3. "Flame" (Ira Antelis, Brenda Russell) – 4:28
4. "He Doesn't Love You" (Sandy Knox, Billy Stritch) – 3:01
5. "New Attitude" (Jon Gilutin, Bunny Hull, Sharon Robinson) – 2:23
6. "If You Asked Me To" (Diane Warren) – 3:13
7. "If Only You Knew" (Cynthia Biggs, Gamble, Dexter Wansel) – 7:13
8. "You Are My Friend" (Armstead Edwards, James Budd Ellison, Patti LaBelle) – 5:21
9. "Lord's Side" (Timothy Wright) – 6:12

Disc 2

1. "The Bells" (Anna Gordy Gaye, Marvin Gaye, Iris Gordy, Elgie Stover) – 3:17
2. "Is It Still Good to You" (Nickolas Ashford, Valerie Simpson) – 4:41 - duet with Gerald Levert
3. "Don't Make Me Over" (Burt Bacharach, Hal David) – 3:13
4. "If You Love Me" (Marguerite Monnot, Geoffrey Parsons) – 6:35
5. "On My Own" (Burt Bacharach, Carole Bayer Sager) – 5:14
6. "Sparkle" (Curtis Mayfield) – 1:05
7. "Got to Be Real" (Cheryl Lynn, David Paich, David Foster) – 3:24 - duet with Mariah Carey
8. "Lady Marmalade" (Bob Crewe, Kenny Nolan) – 5:08
9. "Patti Talk" – 3:09
10. "A Change Is Gonna Come" (Sam Cooke) – 4:04
11. "Hold On (Change Is Comin')" (Clarke, Reid, Seacer, Steele, Troutman, Roger Troutman) – 4:55 - collaboration with Gerald Levert and Eddie Levert
12. "Over the Rainbow" (Harold Arlen, Yip Harburg) – 5:12
13. "I Believe I Can Fly" (R. Kelly) – 2:51

== Personnel ==
- Patti LaBelle - vocals
- James "Herb" Smith - guitar
- Manuel Yanes - bass guitar
- John Beal - acoustic bass
- Nathaniel Wilkie - keyboards, assistant musical director
- John Stanley - piano, keyboards, backing vocals
- John Blackwell - drums
- José Rossy - percussion
- Emily Mitchell - harp
- Gary Topper - tenor saxophone
- Harvey Estrin - alto saxophone
- Roger Rosenberg - baritone saxophone
- George Flynn - bass trombone
- Hollis Burridge, Lew Soloff - trumpet
- Jim Pugh, Larry Farrell - trombone
- Bob Carlisle - French horn
- Jeanne Leblanc, Mark Shuman - cello
- Abe Appleman, Ann Leathers, Charles Libove, Eric Wyrick, Jean Ingraham, Joel Pitchon, Richard Rood, Robert Chausow - violin
- Carol Landon, Karen Dreyfus, Mary Hammann - viola
- James Budd Ellison - musical director, conductor, arrangements
- Jack Faith, Richard Di Cicco - string arrangements
- Emil Charlap - conductor

== Chart performance ==
Live! One Night Only reached peak positions of number 182 on the Billboard 200 and number 51 on the Top R&B Albums chart.

== Legacy ==
The duet cover of "Got to Be Real" was used as the title and theme song of the parody digital series Got 2B Real, which featured LaBelle and Carey as lead characters.

== Accolades ==
Year	Nominee / work	Award	Result
1999	Live! One Night Only	Grammy Award for Best Traditional R&B Performance	Won
