= Some Things Are Meant to Be =

Studio album by Linda Davis
- Released: January 30, 1996
- Studios: Sound Stage Studios, The Work Station and Emerald Sound Studios (Nashville, Tennessee)
- Genre: Country
- Length: 35:32
- Label: Arista
- Producer: John Guess

Linda Davis chronology
Shoot for the Moon (1994)	Some Things Are Meant to Be (1996)	I'm Yours (1998)

Professional ratings
Review scores
Source	Rating
Allmusic	link

Some Things Are Meant to Be is the fourth studio album by American country music singer Linda Davis. Her final studio album for Arista Records, it produced Davis's second-highest chart hit in its title track, a number 13 on the Billboard Hot Country Singles & Tracks (now Hot Country Songs) charts in 1996. "A Love Story in the Making" and "Walk Away" were also issued as singles. The former peaked at 33, while the latter failed to chart.

Four of this album's tracks were also recorded by other artists. "Cast Iron Heart" was originally recorded by Pearl River on their 1993 album Find Out What's Happening, and later by BlackHawk on their 1995 album Strong Enough. "What Do I Know" was recorded by Ricochet on their 1996 self-titled debut album, from which it was released as their debut single. "Neither One of Us" was first recorded by Jim Weatherly on his 1972 album Weatherly. "Walk Away" was originally recorded by Dude Mowrey on his 1993 self-titled album.

== Track listing ==
No.	Title	Writer(s)	Length
1.	"Some Things Are Meant to Be"	Michael Garvin; Gordon Payne	3:28
2.	"A Love Story in the Making"	Al Anderson; Craig Wiseman	3:40
3.	"Walk Away"	Marc Beeson; Robert Byrne	3:58
4.	"Always Will"	Harry Stinson; John Hadley	3:20
5.	"Neither One of Us (Wants to Be the First to Say Goodbye)"	Jim Weatherly	4:04
6.	"She Doesn't As"	Nancy Lee Baxter	3:16
7.	"Cast Iron Heart"	Dennis Linde	3:02
8.	"There Isn't One"	Cathy Majeski; Sunny Russ; Stephony Smith	3:45
9.	"What Do I Know"	Majeski; Russ; Smith	3:24
10.	"If I Could Live Your Life" (duet with Reba McEntire)	Tim Nichols; Mark D. Sanders	3:34
Total length:			35:32

== Production ==
- Tim DuBois – executive producer
- John Guess – producer, track recording, overdub recording, mixing
- Marty Williams – track recording, mastering
- Derek Bason – overdub recording, mix assistant
- Lauren Koch – production assistant for Big Cheese
- Maude Gilman – art direction
- S. Wade Hunt – design
- Mark Tucker – photography
- Mary Beth Felts – make-up
- Maria Smoot – hair
- Sandi Spika – stylist
- Starstruck Entertainment – management

== Personnel ==
- Linda Davis – lead vocals, backing vocals
- John Hobbs – acoustic piano
- Paul Hollowell – acoustic piano
- Steve Nathan – keyboards
- Doug Sisemore – keyboards
- Mark Casstevens – acoustic guitar, mandolin
- Dann Huff — electric guitars
- Don Potter – acoustic guitar
- Kent Wells – acoustic guitar, electric guitars
- Terry Crisp – steel guitar, dobro
- Larry Franklin – mandolin, fiddle
- Charlie Anderson – bass
- Joe Chemay – bass
- Scotty Hawkins – drums
- Lonnie Wilson – drums
- Michael Black – backing vocals
- Vicki Hampton – backing vocals
- Lang Scott – backing vocals
- Harry Stinson – backing vocals
- Reba McEntire – vocals (10)

== Chart performance ==
Chart (1996)	Peak position
U.S. Billboard Top Country Albums	26
U.S. Billboard 200	164
U.S. Billboard Top Heatseekers	7
