= Love Is Stronger Than Pride =

"Love Is Stronger Than Pride" may refer to:

- "Love Is Stronger Than Pride" (Sade song)
- "Love Is Stronger Than Pride" (Ricochet song)
