= Flame (Patti LaBelle album) =

Studio album by Patti LaBelle
- Released: June 24, 1997
- Length: 64:30
- Label: MCA
- Producers: Malcolm Allison; Christian; James R. "Budd" Ellison; David Foster; Jimmy Jam and Terry Lewis; Patti LaBelle; Gerald Levert; Arif Mardin; Sami McKinney; Edwin "Tony" Nicholas; James "Big Jim" Wright

Patti LaBelle chronology
Greatest Hits (1996)	Flame (1997)	Live! One Night Only (1998)

Flame is the thirteenth studio album by American singer Patti LaBelle. It was released by MCA Records on June 24, 1997, in the United States.

== Content ==
Executive produced by LaBelle, Flame features songs from the likes of Jimmy Jam and Terry Lewis, who contributed to much of the compositions and productions on the album while other producers including Gerald Levert, Brenda Russell and David Foster are also featured on the album. The album features the international hit and number-one dance single, "When You Talk About Love", and the R&B radio favorite, "Shoe Was on the Other Foot". The album is also notable for including the ballad, "Don't Block the Blessings", which is the title of LaBelle's best-selling autobiography released a year before Flame.

== Critical reception ==
Professional ratings
Review scores
Source	Rating
AllMusic	2.5/5 stars
USA Today	3/4 stars

Allmusic editor Leo Stanley found that Flame "is largely a slick, seductive collection of ballads punctuated by a handful of restrained dance-pop numbers. And in that sense, it's no different than any of her '90s albums, but that isn't a bad thing, since LaBelle works with top-notch, classy professionals [...] But instead of making the album sound diverse and sprawling, their highly skilled craftsmanship keeps the album unified. All that effort makes the record a pleasurable, listenable album, yet there aren't enough killer hooks or great songs to make it a standout in LaBelle's catalog. Instead, Flame is merely a good Patti LaBelle record, and sometimes that's all you need."

Larry Flick from Billboard wrote, "And the yummy singles from "Flame" just keep on coming. LaBelle effectively reinvents the Reba McEntire and Linda Davis hit as a R&B ballad. David Foster's production has ample soul, swelling from a quietly percussive opening into a grand closing that allow Miss Patti to do what she does best—belt with the power to shatter glass. With the previous "Shoe Was On The Other Foot" poised for club success, it's looking like a LaBelle-filled fall. What a joy!" USA Today critic Steve Jones wrote that Flame showed how LaBelle's "never just sings a song; she works it," as she "caresses melodies and toys with lyrics," building emotion on "Does He Love You" and getting energized on "When You Talk About Love."

== Track listing ==
Flame track listing
No.	Title	Writer(s)	Producer(s)	Length
1.	"Someone Like You"	James Harris III; Terry Lewis; James "Big Jim" Wright	Jimmy Jam and Terry Lewis; Wright (co.)	5:55
2.	"I Like the Way It Feels"	Gerald LeVert; Edwin "Tony" Nicholas; Patti LaBelle	Levert; Nicholas	4:38
3.	"You Are My Solid Ground"	David Foster; Linda Thompson	Foster	3:59
4.	"Flame"	Brenda Russell; Ira Antelis	Arif Mardin	4:10
5.	"Let Me Be Your Lady"	Harris; Lewis; Wright	Jam and Lewis; Wright (co.)	4:17
6.	"Does He Love You"	Sandy Knox; Billy Stritch	Foster	4:17
7.	"Shoe Was on the Other Foot"	Levert; Nicholas	Levert; Nicholas	4:24
8.	"Addicted to You"	Sheldon "So" Goode; Sami McKinney; Denise Rich	McKinney; Christian	4:12
9.	"When You Talk About Love"	Harris; Lewis; Wright	Jam and Lewis; Wright (co.)	5:32
10.	"Love Is Just a Whisper Away"	Goode; McKinney; Rich	McKinney; Christian	5:19
11.	"If By Chance"	Bernard Belle	Mardin	4:39
12.	"Let Me Be There for You"	Jayne Oldeman; Dwayna Litz	James R. "Budd" Ellison	4:19
13.	"You Saved My Life"	Terry Steele; Tommy Keane	Mardin	4:00
14.	"Don't Block the Blessings"	Don Graham; Pam Wolfe; Malcolm Allison; Armstead Edwards	Allison; LaBelle	4:49
Total length:				64:30

== Personnel ==
- Patti LaBelle – lead vocals, backing vocals (1, 2, 5, 7–10, 14), BGV arrangements (14)
- James Wright – keyboards (1, 5, 9), backing vocals (1, 5)
- Gerald Levert – keyboard programming (2, 7), sequencing (2, 7), drums (2, 7), arrangements (2, 7)
- Edwin "Tony" Nicholas – keyboard programming (2, 7), sequencing (2, 7), drums (2, 7), arrangements (2, 7)
- David Foster – keyboards (3, 6), arrangements (3, 6)
- Simon Franglen – Synclavier programming (3, 6)
- Steve Skinner – keyboards (4, 11), synthesizers (4, 11), arrangements (4, 11), string arrangements (4, 11)
- Patrick Henderson – organ (10)
- Corey Williams – acoustic piano (10)
- Nathanial Wilkie – keyboards (12), BGV arrangements (14)
- Robbie Kondor – keyboards (13), synthesizers (13), string arrangements (13)
- Malcolm Allison – keyboards (14), programming (14), string arrangements (14)
- Lambchops – keyboards (14), programming (14), BGV arrangements (14)
- Mike Scott – guitars (1, 5, 9)
- Michael Thompson – guitars (3, 6)
- Ira Siegel – acoustic guitar (4), electric guitar (11)
- Aaron McClain – acoustic guitar (8)
- Herb Smith – guitars (12)
- Brian "Rio" Lewis – bass (8, 10)
- Alex Richbourg – drum programming (1, 5, 9)
- Gen Rubin – drum programming (4, 11)
- Cindy Blackman – drums (10)
- Gerard Barnes – drums (12)
- Rodney Green – additional drums (14)
- Richard Rodriguez – percussion (8)
- Joe Mardin – percussion (13)
- Regina Carter – violin (4)
- Najee – saxophone (8, 10)
- Jimmy Jam and Terry Lewis – arrangerments (1, 5, 9)
- Dennis Williams – horn and string arrangements (2, 7), conductor (2, 7)
- Kathleen Thomas – string arrangements and conductor (8, 14)
- Arif Mardin – arrangements (11), string arrangements (11, 13)
- Jack Faith – orchestration (12)
- James Budd Ellison – BGV arrangements (14)
- Gene Orloff – concertmaster (4, 11, 13)
- Eboni – strings (8)
- Jamecia Bennett – backing vocals (1, 9)
- Ann Nesby – backing vocals (1)
- Sherena Wynn – backing vocals (2, 7)
- Jerry Barnes – backing vocals (4, 11)
- Katreese Barnes – backing vocals (4, 11)
- Lisa Fischer – backing vocals (4, 8, 11)
- Terry Steele – backing vocals (4)
- Sisaundra Myers – backing vocals (8)
- Lori Perry – backing vocals (8, 10)
- Kevin Ford – backing vocals (9)
- Cherrelle Norton – backing vocals (8)
- Sami McKinney – backing vocals (10)
- Curtis King – backing vocals (11)
- Debbie Henry – backing vocals (14), BGV arrangements (14)
- John Stanley – backing vocals (14), BGV arrangements (14)

Strings (Tracks 4, 11, 13 & 14)

- John Blake, Richard Hotchkiss, Richard Jones, Orest Markiah, Jennifer Morgo, Tanya Murphy, Anthony Pirollo, Melvin Roundtree and Nina Wilkenson

Strings (Track 12)

- Patricia Daniels and Marc Ward – cello
- Sophie Labiner – harp
- Nina Cottman and Ruth Wright – viola
- Larry Abramovitz, Bonnie Ayers, Emma Kummrow, Olga Lonolpelsky, Charles Parker, Jean Perrault, Christine Reeves and Helen Wedgen – violin

== Production ==
- Jimmy Jam and Terry Lewis – producers (1, 5, 9)
- James "Big Jim" Wright – co-producer (1, 5, 9)
- Gerald Levert – producer (2, 7)
- Edwin "Tony" Nicholas – producer (2, 7)
- David Foster – producer (3, 6)
- Arif Mardin – producer (4, 11, 13)
- Sami McKinney – producer (8, 10)
- Christian Warren – producer (8, 10)
- James Budd Ellison – producer (12)
- Malcolm Allison – producer (14)
- Patti LaBelle – producer (14), executive producer
- Armstead Edwards – executive producer
- Barbara Ferber – production assistant
- Pulcheria Ricks – production assistant
- Kenny J. Gravillis – art direction, design
- Vartan – art direction, design
- Albert Sanchez – photography

Technical

- Glenn Barratt – engineer
- Jeff Chestek – engineer
- Felipe Elgueta – engineer
- Steve Groom – engineer
- Steve Hodge – engineer, mixing
- Richard Joseph – engineer
- Rod Milwood – engineer
- Michael O'Reilly – engineer, mixing
- Al Schmit – engineer
- Arthur Stoppe – engineer
- Mike Tarsia – engineer, mixing
- Mick Guzauski – mixing
- Ron A. Shaffer – mixing
- Brian Garten – assistant engineer
- Gordon Rice – assistant engineer
- Rick Ridpath – assistant engineer, mix assistant
- Xavier Smith – assistant engineer
- Tom Bender – mix assistant
- Hilary Bercovici – mix assistant
- Brian Gardner – mastering

== Charts ==
=== Weekly charts ===
Weekly chart performance for Flame
Chart (1997)	Peak position
Australian Albums (ARIA)	192
US Billboard 200	39
US Top R&B/Hip-Hop Albums (Billboard)	10

=== Year-end charts ===
Year-end chart performance for Flame
Chart (1997)	Position
US Top R&B/Hip-Hop Albums (Billboard)	74

== Certifications ==
Certifications for Flame
Region	Certification	Certified units/sales
United States (RIAA)	Gold	500,000^{^}
^{^} Shipments figures based on certification alone.
