= In Pictures (song) =

Single by Alabama

from the album In Pictures
- B-side: "Between the Two of Them"
- Released: September 30, 1995
- Genre: Country
- Length: 3:33
- Label: RCA Nashville
- Songwriters: Bobby Boyd; Joe Doyle
- Producers: Alabama; Emory Gordy Jr.

Alabama singles chronology
"She Ain't Your Ordinary Girl" (1995)	"In Pictures" (1995)	"It Works" (1996)

"In Pictures" is a song written by Joe Doyle and Bobby Boyd, and recorded by Linda Davis for her 1994 studio album Shoot for the Moon. The song was later recorded by Alabama and released in September 1995 as the second single and title track from their album In Pictures. The song reached #4 on the Billboard Hot Country Singles & Tracks chart in December 1995.

== Content ==
The song tells the story of a divorced father which the song implies that the mother has full custody of his daughter (and apparently has very little, if any, visitation rights) and thus is forced to watch his daughter grow up via photographs.

== Chart performance ==
Chart (1995)	Peak position
Canada Country Singles (RPM)	3
US Bubbling Under Hot 100 (Billboard)	18
US Hot Country Songs (Billboard)	4
