= Linda Davis (album) =

Studio album by Linda Davis
- Released: April 13, 1992
- Studio: Sound Stage Studios (Nashville, Tennessee)
- Genre: Country
- Length: 33:59
- Label: Liberty
- Producer: Jimmy Bowen; Linda Davis

Linda Davis chronology
In a Different Light (1991)	Linda Davis (1992)	Shoot for the Moon (1994)

Professional ratings
Review scores
Source	Rating
AllMusic	3/5 stars

Linda Davis is the second album by country music artist Linda Davis, released in 1992. Her final album for Liberty Records, it produced two non-charting singles in "There's Something 'Bout Loving You" and "He Isn't My Affair Anymore". The track "Just Enough Rope" would later be cut by Rick Trevino, who released it as a single in 1994. Trevino also released this same song in Spanish under the title "Bastante Cordón". Ronnie Milsap also recorded "L.A. to the Moon" on his 1991 album Greatest Hits, Vol. 3.

== Production ==
The album was produced by Jimmy Bowen and Davis.

== Track listing ==
1. "There's Something 'Bout Loving You" (Chris Waters, Tom Shapiro) – 3:20
2. "Years After You" (Thom Schuyler) – 3:07
3. "He Isn't My Affair Anymore" (DeWayne Blackwell) – 3:04
4. "Just Enough Rope" (Karen Staley, Steve Dean) – 3:34
5. "Tonight She's Climbing the Walls" (Craig Bickhardt) – 3:31
6. "Love Happens" (Wayland Holyfield, Verlon Thompson) – 3:53
7. "The Boy Back Home" (Gary Harrison, Tim Mensy) – 4:15
8. "Do I Do It to You Too?" (Waters, Shapiro) – 2:32
9. "Isn't That What You Told Her?" (Staley, Gary Harrison) – 3:20
10. "L.A. to the Moon" (Susan Longacre, Lonnie Wilson) – 3:23

== Personnel ==
- Linda Davis – lead vocals, backing vocals
- John Barlow Jarvis – keyboards
- Walt Cunningham – synthesizers
- Brent Rowan – electric guitars
- Billy Joe Walker Jr. – acoustic guitars, electric guitars
- Bruce Bouton – steel guitar
- Michael Rhodes – bass
- Eddie Bayers – drums
- Rob Hajacos – fiddle
- Terry McMillan – harmonica
- Lang Scott – backing vocals
- Lisa Silver – backing vocals
- Harry Stinson – backing vocals

=== Production ===
- Jimmy Bowen – producer
- Linda Davis – producer
- John Guess – recording, mixing, overdub recording
- Tim Kish – overdub recording
- Marty Williams – overdub recording, recording assistant, mix assistant, overdub assistant
- Milan Bogdan – digital editing
- Glenn Meadows – mastering at Masterfonics (Nashville, Tennessee)
- Ray Pillow – song selection assistant
- Virginia Team – art direction
- Jerry Joyner – design
- Mark Tucker – photography
- Maria Smoot – hair, make-up
- Sheri McCoy – stylist
- Narvel Blackstock – management for Starstruck Entertainment
