= Linda Davis =

American country music singer (born 1962)

- Born: Linda Kaye Davis; November 26, 1962 (age 63); Dodson, Texas, U.S.
- Genres: Country
- Occupation: Singer
- Instrument: Vocals
- Years active: 1980–present
- Labels: MDJ; Epic; Liberty; Arista Nashville; Dreamcatcher; DreamWorks Nashville
- Formerly of: Skip & Linda; The Scott Family
- Spouse: Lang Scott (m. 1984)
- Website: www.lindadavis.com

Linda Kaye Scott (née Davis; born November 26, 1962) is an American country music singer. Before beginning a career as a solo artist, she had three minor country singles in the charts as one half of the duo Skip & Linda. In her solo career, Davis has recorded five studio albums for major record labels and more than 15 singles. Her highest chart entry is "Does He Love You", her 1993 duet with Reba McEntire, which reached number one on the Billboard country charts and won both singers the Grammy for Best Country Vocal Collaboration. Her highest solo chart position is "Some Things Are Meant to Be" at No. 13 in 1996. Davis is married to the country singer Lang Scott; her daughter is Hillary Scott of Lady A.

Davis won the Grammy Award for Best Contemporary Christian Album and Best Contemporary Christian Music Performance/Song as part of the Scott Family's album Love Remains. Linda Davis now has three Grammy wins in her career.

Linda won the Billboard Music Award, as part of Hillary Scott & The Scott Family, for Top Christian Song ("Thy Will") in May, 2017.

== Biography ==
Linda Kaye Davis was born November 26, 1962, in Dodson, Texas. She first sang in public on a local radio show at age six. By the time she was 20, Davis had moved to Nashville, Tennessee, where she paired up with the singer Skip Eaton to form the duo Skip & Linda. They signed to MDJ Records and had three minor singles on the Billboard country charts. Davis later performed at a piano bar inside a Sheraton hotel, when she was discovered by the record producer Bob Montgomery.

Davis moved to Tennessee and became a receptionist for a small studio. She occasionally sang demos and jingles. Shortly after starting her job she met a songwriter who became her husband: Lang Scott. After marrying in August 1984, they had two daughters: Their daughters are Hillary Scott (April 1, 1986) and Rylee Jean Scott (2000).

== Career ==
=== In a Different Light and Linda Davis ===
Davis's first solo chart entry came in 1988 on Epic Records, although it was not until 1991 that she released her first album In a Different Light on Liberty Records. This album produced two chart singles, but no Top 40 hits. That same year, Davis co-wrote the title track of Dawn Sears's debut album What a Woman Wants to Hear. A year later, Davis released her second album, Linda Davis, which did not produce any chart singles at all. Reba McEntire then chose Davis as a backing vocalist for her road band.

=== "Does He Love You" and Shoot for the Moon ===
Davis had her biggest chart success in 1993 when she and McEntire recorded their duet "Does He Love You". Davis's only number one country hit, it also won her and McEntire a Grammy Award for Best Country Vocal Collaboration that year. Soon afterward, Davis signed to Arista Nashville and recorded her third album, Shoot for the Moon. This album's first single, the Mac McAnally composition "Company Time", failed to enter the Top 40. It was followed by "Love Didn't Do It" at No. 58. Davis, along with Trisha Yearwood and Martina McBride, sang guest vocals on McEntire's mid-1995 cover version of the Patti LaBelle/Michael McDonald song "On My Own", although only McEntire received chart credit for it.

=== Some Things Are Meant to Be ===
Davis did not enter Top 40 on the country charts again until 1996 with the title track of her 1996 album Some Things Are Meant to Be, her second album for Arista. This song peaked at No. 13 on the country charts, becoming her highest solo chart position. Following it were "A Love Story in the Making" (co-written by the former NRBQ member Al Anderson) at No. 33, and "Walk Away", which failed to chart. Also included on this album was the song "What Do I Know", released by Ricochet the same year as its first single.

=== I'm Yours ===
Davis's fifth album, I'm Yours, was released in 1998 on DreamWorks Records, then a newly established record label. Its first single, "I Wanna Remember This", was used on the soundtrack to the film Black Dog. The song peaked at No. 20 in 1998, followed by the title track at No. 38 and "From the Inside Out" at No. 60. After this latter song, Davis left DreamWorks. She was signed to Kenny Rogers' Dreamcatcher Records in 2000.

=== 2003–present ===
In 2003, Davis self-released a Christmas album with her husband, Lang Scott, and their daughter, Hillary (b. April 1, 1986). Two more self-released albums, I Have Arrived and Young at Heart, followed in 2004 and 2007, respectively. Hillary founded the country music group Lady A in 2006, who were known as Lady Antebellum up until 2020.

In 2009, Davis was inducted into the Texas Country Music Hall of Fame.

Davis joined Lulu Roman (of Hee Haw fame) for a cover version of Anne Murray's "You Needed Me" on Roman's 2013 album At Last.

In 2013 & 2015, Davis toured with the late country singer Kenny Rogers. Davis also accompanied Rogers on his "The Gambler's Last Deal" retirement tour in 2017.

== Discography ==
=== Albums ===
Title	Album details	Peak chart positions		
Title	Album details	US Country	US	US Heat
In a Different Light	Release date: February 1, 1991; Label: Capitol Records	—	—	—
Linda Davis	Release date: April 21, 1992; Label: Liberty Records	—	—	—
Shoot for the Moon	Release date: April 26, 1994; Label: Arista Nashville	28	124	2
Some Things Are Meant to Be	Release date: January 30, 1996; Label: Arista Nashville	26	164	7
I'm Yours	Release date: November 3, 1998; Label: DreamWorks Nashville	61	—	—
Family Christmas (with Lang and Hillary Scott)	Release date: November 7, 2003; Label: Center Hill	—	—	—
I Have Arrived	Release date: November 19, 2004; Label: Center Hill	—	—	—
Young at Heart	Release date: December 4, 2007; Label: Center Hill	—	—	—
Love Remains (as Hillary Scott & the Scott Family)	Release date: July 29, 2016; Label: EMI Records Nashville	2	7	—
"—" denotes releases that did not chart

=== Singles ===
==== As Skip & Linda ====
Year	Single	Peak positions	Album
Year	Single	US Country	Album
1982	"If You Could See You Through My Eyes"	63	—N/a
1982	"I Just Can't Turn Temptation Down"	73	—N/a
1982	"This Time"	89	—N/a

==== Solo ====
Year	Single	Peak chart positions		Album
Year	Single	US Country	CAN Country	Album
1988	"All the Good Ones Are Taken"	50	—	—N/a
1989	"Back in the Swing Again"	51	—	—N/a
1989	"Weak Nights"	67	—	—N/a
1991	"In a Different Light"	61	—	In a Different Light
1991	"Some Kinda Woman"	68	—	In a Different Light
1991	"Three Way Tie"	—	—	In a Different Light
1992	"There's Something 'Bout Loving You"	—	—	Linda Davis
1992	"He Isn't My Affair Anymore"	—	—	Linda Davis
1994	"Company Time"	43	73	Shoot for the Moon
1994	"Love Didn't Do It"	58	—	Shoot for the Moon
1995	"Some Things Are Meant to Be"	13	13	Some Things Are Meant to Be
1996	"A Love Story in the Making"	33	22	Some Things Are Meant to Be
1996	"Walk Away"	—	80	Some Things Are Meant to Be
1998	"I Wanna Remember This"	20	31	Black Dog (soundtrack)
1998	"I'm Yours"	38	52	I'm Yours
1999	"From the Inside Out"	60	—	I'm Yours
"—" denotes releases that did not chart

==== As Hillary Scott & the Scott Family ====
Year	Single	Peak chart positions				Album
Year	Single	US Country	US Christ	US Christ Airplay	US Bubble	Album
2016	"Thy Will"	27	1	1	12	Love Remains
2017	"Still"	—	20	21	—	Love Remains

==== Guest singles ====
Year	Single	Artist	Peak chart positions			Album
Year	Single	Artist	US Country	CAN Country	UK	Album
1993	"Does He Love You"	Reba McEntire	1	1	—	Greatest Hits Volume Two
1999	"Does He Love You"	Reba McEntire	—	—	62	Moments and Memories: The Best of Reba
"—" denotes releases that did not chart

=== Music videos ===
Year	Video	Director
1989	"Weak Nights"	Larry Boothby
1990	"In a Different Light"	Greg Crutcher
1991	"Three Way Tie"	Jack Cole
1992	"He Isn't My Affair Anymore"	
1993	"Does He Love You" (with Reba McEntire)	Jon Small
1994	"Company Time"	Jon Small
1994	"Love Didn't Do It"	Jon Small
1995	"Some Things Are Meant to Be"	Steven Goldmann
1995	"On My Own" (with Reba McEntire, Martina McBride and Trisha Yearwood)	Dominic Orlando
1998	"I Wanna Remember This"	Steven T. Miller/R. Brad Murano
1998	"I'm Yours"	Morgan Lawley
1999	"From the Inside Out"	Tara Johns
2016	"Thy Will" (with Hillary Scott & the Scott Family)	Shane Drake

== Awards and nominations ==
Year	Association	Category	Nominated work	Result
1988	Academy of Country Music Awards	Top New Female Vocalist	Linda Davis	Nominated
1993	Academy of Country Music Awards	Top Vocal Duet	Linda Davis and Reba McEntire	Nominated
1993	Academy of Country Music Awards	Single of the Year	Does He Love You (with Reba McEntire)	Nominated
1993	Academy of Country Music Awards	Song of the Year	Does He Love You (with Reba McEntire)	Nominated
1993	Academy of Country Music Awards	Video of the Year	Does He Love You (with Reba McEntire)	Nominated
1994	Grammy Awards	Best Country Collaboration with Vocals	Does He Love You (with Reba McEntire)	Won
1994	Country Music Association Awards	Video of the Year	Does He Love You (with Reba McEntire)	Nominated
1994	Country Music Association Awards	Single of the Year	Does He Love You (with Reba McEntire)	Nominated
1994	Country Music Association Awards	Vocal Event of the Year	Does He Love You (with Reba McEntire)	Won
1996	Country Music Association Awards	Vocal Event of the Year	On My Own (with Reba McEntire, Martina McBride and Trisha Yearwood)	Nominated
1996	Grammy Awards	Best Country Collaboration with Vocals	On My Own (with Reba McEntire, Martina McBride and Trisha Yearwood)	Nominated
2009	Texas Country Music Hall of Fame	Inductee	Linda Davis	Won
2017	Grammy Awards	Best Contemporary Christian Album	Love Remains (with Hillary Scott)	Won
2017	Grammy Awards	Best Contemporary Christian Performance/Song	Thy Will	Won
2017	Billboard Music Awards	Top Christian Song	Thy Will	Won
