= The Maker Said Take Her =

Single by Alabama

from the album In Pictures
- B-side: "Nothing Comes Close"
- Released: June 18, 1996
- Genre: Country
- Length: 3:43
- Label: RCA Nashville
- Songwriters: Ronnie Rogers, Mark Wright
- Producers: Alabama and Emory Gordy Jr.

Alabama singles chronology
"Say I" (1996)	"The Maker Said Take Her" (1996)	"Sad Lookin' Moon" (1997)

"The Maker Said Take Her" is a song written by Ronnie Rogers and Mark Wright, and recorded by American country music group Alabama. It was released in June 1996 as the fifth and final single from their album In Pictures. It peaked at number 4 on the United States Billboard Hot Country Singles & Tracks chart, and at number 13 on the Canadian RPM Country Tracks chart.

== Chart positions ==
"The Maker Said Take Her" debuted at number 65 on the U.S. Billboard Hot Country Singles & Tracks for the week of July 20, 1996.

Chart (1996)	Peak position
Canada Country Singles (RPM)	13
US Hot Country Songs (Billboard)	4

=== Year-end charts ===
Chart (1996)	Position
US Country Songs (Billboard)	64
