= Ease My Troubled Mind =

Single by Ricochet

from the album Ricochet
- B-side: "Rowdy"
- Released: January 18, 1997
- Genre: Country
- Length: 3:36
- Label: Columbia
- Songwriters: Tom Shapiro, Michael Garvin, Chris Waters
- Producers: Ron Chancey, Ed Seay

Ricochet singles chronology
| "Love Is Stronger Than Pride" (1996) | "Ease My Troubled Mind" (1997) | "He Left a Lot to Be Desired" (1997) |

"Ease My Troubled Mind" is a song written by Tom Shapiro, Michael Garvin and Chris Waters, and recorded by American country music group Ricochet. It was released on January 18, 1997, as the fourth and final single from the album Ricochet. The song reached number 20 on the Billboard Hot Country Singles & Tracks chart.

== Music video ==
The music video was directed by Marc Ball, and premiered on CMT on January 20, 1997.

== Chart performance ==
| Chart (1997) | Peak position |
|---|---|
| Canada Country Singles (RPM) | 22 |
| US Hot Country Songs (Billboard) | 20 |
