= Nothin' but Good =

Studio album by Dawn Sears
- Released: August 30, 1994
- Genre: Country
- Length: 32:38
- Label: Decca
- Producer: Mark Wright

Dawn Sears chronology
What a Woman Wants to Hear (1991)	Nothin' but Good (1994)	Dawn Sears (2002)

Nothin' but Good is the second album by American country music singer Dawn Sears. It was released in 1994 via Decca Records.

== Critical reception ==
Giving it 3 out of 5 stars, Jim Ridley of New Country magazine thought that the album's production was "straight down the middle of a pop-country road" and "still fails to register Sears' own personality strongly", but thought that her performances on "Runaway Train", "Uh Oh", and "Planet of Love" were solid. He added that she "sings most movingly" on "Little Orphan Annie", a song written in tribute to her parents.

== Track listing ==
No.	Title	Writer(s)	Length
1.	"Runaway Train"	Kim Richey; Terry Burns	3:28
2.	"Close Up the Honky Tonks"	Red Simpson	2:44
3.	"That's Where I Wanna Take Our Love"	Dean Dillon; Hank Cochran	3:05
4.	"Nothin' but Good"	Kostas; Will Robinson	2:52
5.	"No Relief in Sight"	Rory Michael Bourke; Gene Dobbins; Johnny Wilson	3:16
6.	"Uh Oh (Here Comes Love)"	Robert Ellis Orrall; Carlene Carter; Howie Epstein	3:24
7.	"Planet of Love"	Jim Lauderdale; John Leventhal	3:57
8.	"It Was Too Late"	Joy Swinea; Jerry Taylor; Toni Dae	3:33
9.	"If I Didn't Have You in My World"	Vince Gill; Jim Weatherly	3:54
10.	"Little Orphan Annie"	Dawn Sears	2:25
Total length:			32:38

== Personnel ==
Compiled from liner notes.

Musicians

- Mike Brignardello — bass guitar
- Mark Casstevens — acoustic guitar
- Stuart Duncan — fiddle
- Pat Flynn — acoustic guitar
- Paul Franklin — steel guitar
- Rob Hajacos — fiddle
- Owen Hale — drums
- John Hughey — steel guitar
- B. James Lowry — acoustic guitar
- Nashville String Machine — strings
- Steve Nathan — keyboards
- Russ Pahl — steel guitar
- Brent Rowan — electric guitar, gut string guitar
- Dawn Sears — lead vocals
- Kenny Sears — fiddle
- Biff Watson — acoustic guitar
- Willie Weeks — bass guitar

Backing vocalists

- Dana McVicker — on "Nothin' but Good"
- Vince Gill — on "If I Didn't Have You in My World"
- Jana King
- Mary Ann Kennedy and Pam Rose — on "Runaway Train"
- Patty Loveless — on "Close Up the Honky Tonks"
- Jonell Mosser — on "If I Didn't Have You in My World"
- Dawn Sears
- Lisa Silver
- Cindy Richardson-Walker
- Bergen White
- Jeff White

Technical

- Robert Charles — engineering, overdubs
- Carl Gorodetzky — concert master
- Mark Hagen — engineering
- Warren Peterson — recording, overdubs
- Lynn Peterzell — mixing
- Denny Purcell — mastering
- Bergen White — string arrangements, conductor
- Mark Wright — production
