= They Asked About You =

Single by Reba McEntire

from the album Greatest Hits Volume Two
- B-side: "For Herself"
- Released: November 1993
- Genre: Country
- Length: 3:12
- Label: MCA 54769
- Songwriters: Kim Nash; Bill Nash; Freddy Weller
- Producers: Tony Brown; Reba McEntire

Reba McEntire singles chronology
"Does He Love You" (1993)	"They Asked About You" (1993)	"Why Haven't I Heard from You" (1994)

Music video
- "They Asked About You" (audio) on YouTube

"They Asked About You" is a song written by Freddy Weller, Bill Nash, and Kim Nash. It was recorded by American country music artist Reba McEntire and was released in December 1993 as the second and final single from her second compilation album for MCA Records, Greatest Hits Volume Two (1993). The song reached number seven on the US Billboard Hot Country Singles & Tracks chart in March 1994.

It debuted at number 48 on the Hot Country Singles & Tracks for the week of December 25, 1993.

== Charts ==
Chart (1993–1994)	Peak position
Canada Country Singles (RPM)	15
US Hot Country Songs (Billboard)	7
