= In Pictures =

1995 album by Alabama

Studio album by Alabama
- Released: August 15, 1995
- Recorded: 1994–1995
- Studio: Emerald Sound and Masterfonics (Nashville, Tennessee).
- Genre: Country
- Length: 38:25
- Label: RCA Nashville
- Producer: Alabama; Emory Gordy, Jr.

Alabama chronology
Greatest Hits Vol. III (1994)	In Pictures (1995)	Christmas Vol. II (1996)

Singles from In Pictures
- 1. "She Ain't Your Ordinary Girl" Released: June 19, 1995; 2. "In Pictures" Released: September 30, 1995; 3. "It Works" Released: January 13, 1996; 4. "Say I" Released: May 18, 1996; 5. "The Maker Said Take Her" Released: June 18, 1996

Professional ratings
Review scores
Source	Rating
Allmusic	3.5/5 stars

In Pictures is the sixteenth studio album by American country music band Alabama, released in 1995. It included the singles "She Ain't Your Ordinary Girl", "In Pictures", "It Works", "Say I" and "The Maker Said Take Her", which respectively reached No. 2, No. 4, No. 19, No. 38 and No. 4 on the Hot Country Songs charts. Making it the first album of their career not to produce a number one hit. The title track was originally recorded by Linda Davis on her 1994 album Shoot for the Moon. The album peaked at No. 100 on the Billboard 200 album charts and No. 12 on the Billboard Country Albums chart.

The album was recorded at Emerald studios in Nashville, Tennessee.

== Track listing ==
No.	Title	Writer(s)	Length
1.	"Sunday Drive"	Ray Kennedy, Dark Alley	2:31
2.	"She Ain't Your Ordinary Girl"	Robert Jason	3:07
3.	"My Love Belongs to You"	Ronnie Rogers	3:34
4.	"I've Loved a Lot More Than I've Hurt"	Max T. Barnes, Max D. Barnes	3:13
5.	"Spin the Wheel"	Michael Clark, Jeff Stevens	4:37
6.	"Nothing Comes Close"	Rogers	3:31
7.	"Say I"	Steve Bogard, Stevens	3:11
8.	"It Works"	Mickey Cates, Mark Alan Springer	3:40
9.	"The Maker Said Take Her"	Rogers, Mark Wright	3:43
10.	"In Pictures"	Bobby Boyd, Joe Doyle	3:33
11.	"Heartbreak Express"	Jeff Cook, Phillip Wolfe	3:39

== Personnel ==
Alabama

- Jeff Cook – guitars, fiddle, backing vocals, lead vocals (11)
- Randy Owen – guitars, lead vocals (1–10), backing vocals (11)
- Teddy Gentry – bass guitar, backing vocals
- Mark Herndon – drums, percussion

Additional Musicians

- John Barlow Jarvis – keyboards
- Mike Lawler– keyboards
- Steve Nathan – keyboards
- Richard Bennett – acoustic guitar, electric guitar
- Biff Watson – acoustic guitar, mandolin
- Steve Gibson – electric guitar
- Larry Hanson – electric guitar
- Dann Huff – electric guitar
- Chris Leuzinger – electric guitar
- Brent Mason – electric guitar
- Craig Krampf – drums
- Lonnie Wilson – drums
- Emory Gordy Jr. – string arrangements (8, 10)
- John Catchings – cello
- Jim Grosjean – viola
- Kathryn Plummer – viola
- Kristin Wilkinson – viola
- David Davidson – violin
- Connie Ellisor – violin
- Connie Heard – violin
- Christian Teal – violin

Production

- Alabama – producers
- Emory Gordy Jr. – producer
- Russ Martin – recording (1, 7, 8)
- Alan Schulman – recording (2–6, 9, 10, 11)
- Tim Waters – assistant engineer
- John Guess – mixing
- Derek Bason – mix assistant
- Glenn Meadows – mastering
- Lauren Koch – production coordinator
- Susan Eaddy – art direction
- Mary Hamilton – art direction
- Kym Juister – design
- Scott Bonner – photo illustration
- Ron Keith – photography

== Charts ==
=== Weekly charts ===
Chart (1995)	Peak position
Canadian Country Albums (RPM)	10
US Billboard 200	100
US Top Country Albums (Billboard)	12

=== Year-end charts ===
Chart (1996)	Position
US Top Country Albums (Billboard)	50

== Certifications ==
Region	Certification	Certified units/sales
United States (RIAA)	Platinum	1,000,000^{^}
^{^} Shipments figures based on certification alone.
