= He Left a Lot to Be Desired =

Single by Ricochet

from the album Blink of an Eye
- B-side: "You Still Got It"
- Released: April 28, 1997
- Genre: Country
- Length: 3:16
- Label: Columbia
- Songwriters: Larry Boone, Rick Bowles
- Producers: Ron Chancey, Ed Seay

Ricochet singles chronology
"Ease My Troubled Mind" (1997)	"He Left a Lot to Be Desired" (1997)	"Blink of an Eye" (1997)

"He Left a Lot to Be Desired" is a song written by Larry Boone and Rick Bowles, and recorded by American country music group Ricochet. It was released in April 1997 as the first single from the album Blink of an Eye. The song reached number 18 on the Billboard Hot Country Singles & Tracks chart.

== Chart performance ==
"He Left a Lot to Be Desired" debuted at number 63 on the U.S. Billboard Hot Country Singles & Tracks for the week of May 3, 1997.

Chart (1997)	Peak position
Canada Country Singles (RPM)	14
US Hot Country Songs (Billboard)	18
