= When You Talk About Love =

1997 single by Patti LaBelle

Single by Patti LaBelle

from the album Flame
- Released: May 20, 1997
- Length: 5:32
- Label: MCA
- Songwriter(s): Ann Nesby; James Harris III; Terry Lewis; James "Big Jim" Wright
- Producer(s): Jimmy Jam and Terry Lewis; Wright (co.)

Patti LaBelle singles chronology
"The Right Kinda Lover" (1994)	"When You Talk About Love" (1997)	"Does He Love You" (1997)

Music video
- "When You Talk About Love" on YouTube

"When You Talk About Love" is a song recorded by American singer and actress Patti LaBelle. It was written by Ann Nesby, James Harris III, Terry Lewis, and James "Big Jim" Wright for her thirteenth studio album, Flame (1997). Production was helmed by Harris and Lewis, with Wright credited as co-producer. Released in May 1997 by MCA Records as the album's lead single, it became one of the LaBelle's most popular hit singles in the 1990s, reaching number 56 on the US Billboard Hot 100 and number 12 on the Billboard Hot R&B/Hip-Hop Songs chart. A dance remix helped to bring the song to number-one on the Billboard Hot Dance Club Songs chart, making it the fourth number-one dance single in LaBelle's career. The accompanying music video featured LaBelle playing a teacher giving a "class" about love.

== Critical reception ==
Barry Walters for The Advocate noted, "Remixer Hex Hector saves LaBelle from the usual R&B radio cheese, and the result is Miss Thing's first proper club hit since — whew! — 'New Attitude'." Larry Flick from Billboard magazine wrote, "No one serves diva drama quite like Miss Patti. Her new album, Flame, is ushered in with an irresistible, funk-fortified slice o' soul. Producers Jimmy Jam, Terry Lewis, and Big Jim Wright have created a track that is intelligent enough to please the artist's mature listeners while kicking a beat that's tough enough to lure the kiddies. By the end of the first chorus, you'll be doing a little shoulder-shakin' shimmy, wailing along to LaBelle's my name is love rants. R&B programmers need to care about this single—in fact, so do top 40 tastemakers."

== Track listings ==
CD single
No.	Title	Length
1.	"When You Talk About Love" (LP Version)	5:32
2.	"When You Talk About Love" (Main Club Pass)	6:56

== Charts ==
Chart (1997)	Peak position
US Billboard Hot 100	56
US Dance Club Songs (Billboard)	1
US Hot R&B/Hip-Hop Songs (Billboard)	12
