= Blink of an Eye (Ricochet album) =

Studio album by Ricochet
- Released: June 16, 1997
- Recorded: 1997 at Westwood Studios and The Money Pit, Nashville, TN
- Genre: Country
- Length: 33:14
- Label: Columbia
- Producers: Ron Chancey, Ed Seay

Ricochet chronology
Ricochet (1996)	Blink of an Eye (1997)	What You Leave Behind (2000)

Professional ratings
Review scores
Source	Rating
Allmusic -	3/5 stars

Blink of an Eye is the second studio album by American country music band Ricochet. It was released in 1997 via Columbia Records. The album includes three singles, all of which charted on Billboard Hot Country Songs: "He Left a Lot to Be Desired", the title track, and "Connected at the Heart", at #18, #39 and #44 respectively. "Can't Be Good for Your Heart" was co-written by Porter Howell of Little Texas, and "The Last Love in This Town" was co-written by Don Ellis, formerly of the duo Darryl & Don Ellis.

== Track listing ==
No.	Title	Writer(s)	Length
1.	"Blink of an Eye"	Josh Leo, Rick Bowles	2:52
2.	"He Left a Lot to Be Desired"	Bowles, Larry Boone	3:16
3.	"What a Woman Can Do"	Rob Crosby, Billy Thomas	3:21
4.	"Can't Be Good for Your Heart"	Porter Howell, Chuck Jones	2:43
5.	"The Girl Formerly Known as Mine"	Steve Bogard, Jeff Stevens, Greg Cook	3:49
6.	"Don't Forget to Feed the Jukebox (While I'm Gone)"	Kerry Kurt Phillips, Robert Jenkins, Michael Higgins	3:44
7.	"The Last Love in This Town"	Billy Montana, Steve Dean, Don Ellis	3:23
8.	"Connected at the Heart"	Skip Ewing, Donny Kees	4:36
9.	"You Can't Go by That"	Ron Harbin, Kim Tribble, Kim Williams	2:21
10.	"You Still Got It"	Bowles, Boone	2:58

== Personnel ==
As listed in liner notes.

- Bruce Bouton - steel guitar
- Mike Brignardello - bass guitar
- Joe Chemay - bass guitar
- Larry Franklin - fiddle, mandolin
- Paul Franklin - steel guitar
- John Hobbs - keyboards
- Paul Leim - drums
- Brent Rowan - electric guitar
- Biff Watson - acoustic guitar
- Lonnie Wilson - drums

== Chart performance ==
Chart (1997)	Peak position
U.S. Billboard Top Country Albums	24
U.S. Billboard Top Heatseekers	9
