= Greatest Hits Volume Two (Reba McEntire album) =

Greatest hits album by Reba McEntire
- Released: September 28, 1993
- Genre: Country
- Length: 37:04
- Label: MCA
- Producers: Jimmy Bowen; Tony Brown; Reba McEntire

Reba McEntire chronology
It's Your Call (1992)	Greatest Hits Volume Two (1993)	Read My Mind (1994)

Singles from Greatest Hits Volume Two
- 1. "Does He Love You" Released: July 1993; 2. "They Asked About You" Released: November 1993

Professional ratings
Review scores
Source	Rating
Allmusic	4/5 stars

Greatest Hits Volume Two is Reba McEntire's second compilation album for MCA Records. The album debuted at number 3 on the Country Albums chart for the week of October 16, 1993, and it peaked at #1 for the week of January 22, 1994. It stayed in the Top 10 for 12 weeks and came off the charts at number 47 for the week of January 11, 1997.

On the Billboard 200 the album debuted at number 8 for the week of October 16, 1993, and moved up to its #5 peak the following week. It increased sales to over 183,000 during Christmas week. This would remain her best selling week sales until 14 years later when Reba: Duets opened at 300,000 sales. It was taken off the charts at number 184 for the week of January 6, 1996.

Greatest Hits Volume Two went on to become the best-selling album of McEntire's career, being certified five times platinum by the RIAA. It has gone to sell almost 11 million copies worldwide.

== Content ==
Two new songs were recorded for this compilation, both were released as singles. "Does He Love You", a duet that McEntire recorded with Linda Davis (then a background singer in McEntire's road band), was the first single and turned out to be a smash. It reached number 1 on the country charts. The song also earned them a Grammy award for Best Country Vocal Collaboration as well as the CMA Award for "Vocal Event of the Year". CMT ranked the song at No. 9 on their list of 100 Greatest Duets. "Does He Love You" is the first of three duets featuring Reba and Linda Davis.

The album's other new track was "They Asked About You", which peaked at No. 7 on the country chart.

McEntire produced the album in its entirety, working with Jimmy Bowen on "Walk On" and "Love Will Find Its Way to You", and Tony Brown on all other tracks.

== Track listing ==
No.	Title	Writer(s)	Original album release	Length
1.	"Does He Love You" (duet with Linda Davis)	Sandy Knox, Billy Stritch	Previously unreleased	4:15
2.	"You Lie"	Charlie Black, Bobby Fischer, Austin Roberts	Rumor Has It (1990)	3:55
3.	"Fancy"	Bobbie Gentry	Rumor Has It (1990)	4:59
4.	"For My Broken Heart"	Liz Hengber, Keith Palmer	For My Broken Heart (1991)	4:26
5.	"Love Will Find Its Way to You"	Dave Loggins, J. D. Martin	The Last One to Know (1987)	3:32
6.	"They Asked About You"	Kim Nash, Bill Nash, Freddy Weller	Previously unreleased	3:12
7.	"Is There Life Out There"	Rick Giles, Susan Longacre	For My Broken Heart (1991)	3:50
8.	"Rumor Has It"	Bruce Burch, Vern Dant, Larry Shell	Rumor Has It (1990)	3:43
9.	"Walk On"	Steve Dean, Lonnie Williams	Sweet Sixteen (1989)	3:09
10.	"The Greatest Man I Never Knew"	Richard Leigh, Layng Martine Jr.	For My Broken Heart (1991)	3:10

== Personnel on tracks 1 and 6 ==
- Reba McEntire – lead vocals
- Mike Rojas – acoustic piano
- Doug Sizemore – synthesizers, string pads
- Steve Gibson – electric guitar
- Dann Huff – electric guitar
- Andy Reiss – electric guitar
- Joe McGlohon – acoustic guitar
- Lang Scott – acoustic guitar, backing vocals (6)
- Terry Crisp – steel guitar
- Charlie Anderson – bass guitar
- Scotty Hawkins – drums
- Linda Davis – lead and harmony vocals (1), backing vocals (6)

=== Production ===
- Reba McEntire – producer, make-up
- Tony Brown – producer (1–4, 6–8, 10)
- Jimmy Bowen – producer (5, 9)
- Chuck Ainlay – recording (1, 6), mixing (1, 6), overdub recording (1, 6)
- John Guess – overdub recording (1, 6)
- Derek Bason – second engineer (1, 6)
- Graham Lewis – second engineer (1, 6)
- Glenn Meadows – digital editing (1, 6), mastering
- Jessie Noble – project coordinator
- Mickey Braithwaite – art direction, design
- Peter Nash – photography
- Pam Nicholson – hair, wardrobe
- Sandi Spika – hair, wardrobe
- Narvel Blackstock for Starstruck Entertainment – management

Studios

- Tracks 1 & 6 recorded at Emerald Sound Studio (Nashville, TN).
- Overdubs recorded at The Music Mill - Studio B (Nashville, TN).
- Mixed and Mastered at Masterfonics (Nashville, TN).

== Charts and certifications ==
=== Weekly charts ===
Chart (1993–1994)	Peak position
Australian Albums (ARIA)	200
Canadian Albums (RPM)	39
Canadian Country Albums (RPM)	9
US Billboard 200	5
US Top Country Albums (Billboard)	1

=== Singles ===
Year	Song	Chart positions	
Year	Song	US Country	CAN Country
1993	"Does He Love You"	1	1
1993	"They Asked About You"	7	15
"—" denotes releases that did not chart.

=== Year-end charts ===
Chart (1993)	Position
US Top Country Albums (Billboard)	27
Chart (1994)	Position
US Billboard 200	36
US Top Country Albums (Billboard)	5
Chart (1995)	Position
US Billboard 200	194
US Top Country Albums (Billboard)	23
Chart (1996)	Position
US Top Country Albums (Billboard)	46

=== Certifications/sales ===
Region	Certification	Certified units/sales
Canada (Music Canada)	3× Platinum	300,000^{^}
United States (RIAA)	5× Platinum	5,000,000^{^}
^{^} Shipments figures based on certification alone.
