= Shoot for the Moon (album) =

Studio album by Linda Davis
- Released: April 26, 1994
- Studio: Sound Stage Studios and Masterfonics (Nashville, Tennessee)
- Genre: Country
- Length: 31:45
- Label: Arista Nashville
- Producer: John Guess

Linda Davis chronology
Linda Davis (1992)	Shoot for the Moon (1994)	Some Things Are Meant to Be (1996)

Professional ratings
Review scores
Source	Rating
AllMusic	4.5/5 stars

Shoot for the Moon is the third album by country music artist Linda Davis, It was her first to achieve placement on the Billboard Music Charts. It was the first album released following a win at the 1994 Grammy Awards for Best Country Vocal Collaboration (with country superstar Reba McEntire) for their hit "Does He Love You." The album rose to the number 28 position on the Country Albums chart, and two of its tracks were relatively minor hits on the singles charts: "Company Time" at number 43, and "Love Didn't Do It" at number 58. The former was previously recorded by Mac McAnally on his 1990 album Simple Life.

"In Pictures" was later recorded by Alabama on their 1995 album of the same name.

== Reception ==
Tim DuBois, president of Arista's Nashville division, said that "we rushed it" after Davis won a Grammy Award for her duet with Reba McEntire on "Does He Love You". Billboard reviewed the album favorably, praising John Guess's "punchy but rootsy" production and Davis's singing voice, while considering "Company Time", "A Family Tie", and the title track as the strongest cuts.

== Track listing ==
1. "Shoot for the Moon" (Harry Robinson, Chapin Hartford) – 3:15
2. "Company Time" (Mac McAnally) – 3:21
3. "If Promises Were Gold" (Shawna Harrington-Burkhart, Karl Hasten) – 3:15
4. "Love Didn't Do It" (Steven Dale Jones, Bobby Tomberlin) – 2:44
5. "He's in Dallas" (Johnny MacRae, Richard Ross, Donny Kees) – 3:02
6. "When You Took Your Love Away" (Skip Ewing, Liz Hengber) – 2:57
7. "How Can I Make You Love Me?" (Linda Davis, Jim Weatherly) – 3:27
8. "Don't You Want My Love?" (Ewing, Don Sampson) – 3:06
9. "In Pictures" (Joe Doyle, Bobby E. Boyd) – 3:10
10. "A Family Tie" (Hugh Prestwood) – 3:28

== Production ==
- John Guess – producer, mixing
- Marty Williams – recording
- Derek Bason – recording assistant, mix assistant
- Glenn Meadows – mastering
- Lauren Koch – production coordinator for Big Cheese
- Maude Gilman – art direction
- S. Wade Hunt – design
- Randee St. Nicholas – photography
- Sandi Spika – stylist
- Eric Barnard – hair, make-up
- Starstruck Entertainment – management

== Personnel ==
- Linda Davis – lead vocals, backing vocals
- Steve Nathan – keyboards
- Gary Prim – keyboards
- Mark Casstevens – acoustic guitar, mandolin
- Skip Ewing – acoustic guitar
- Randy Scruggs – acoustic guitar
- Steve Gibson – electric guitar, mandolin
- Dann Huff – electric guitar
- Chris Leuzinger – electric guitar
- Terry Crisp – steel guitar
- Paul Franklin – steel guitar
- Jerry Douglas – dobro
- Joe Chemay – bass
- Paul Leim – drums, percussion
- Stuart Duncan – fiddle
- Michael Black – backing vocals
- Vicki Hampton – backing vocals
- Mac McAnally – backing vocals

== Chart performance ==
Chart (1994)	Peak position
U.S. Billboard Top Country Albums	28
U.S. Billboard 200	124
U.S. Billboard Top Heatseekers	2
