= Love Remains (Hillary Scott album) =

Studio album by Hillary Scott & the Scott Family
- Released: July 29, 2016
- Recorded: 2011–16
- Genre: Christian Country; CCM
- Length: 52:09
- Label: EMI Nashville; Capitol Nashville
- Producer: Ricky Skaggs

Hillary Scott albums chronology
Family Christmas (2003)	Love Remains (2016)

Linda Davis albums chronology
Young at Heart (2007)	Love Remains (2016)

Singles from Love Remains
- 1. "Thy Will" Released: April 22, 2016; 2. "Still" Released: March 2017

Love Remains is a studio album by American singer and songwriter Hillary Scott, a founding member of American country music trio Lady A, released in collaboration with her father, Lang Scott; her mother, Linda Davis; and her sister Rylee Scott (credited collectively as 'The Scott Family'). It was released on July 29, 2016, by EMI Nashville and Capitol Nashville. The faith-based record incorporates elements of gospel, bluegrass, country, and pop genres and is produced by Ricky Skaggs.

Upon release, Love Remains achieved moderate commercial success, including a top-10 debut on the all-genre Billboard 200 chart. It additionally bowed atop the Billboard Christian Albums chart and at number 2 on the Country Albums chart. The record's lead single, "Thy Will", was released in April 2016 and reached the top of the Hot Christian Songs chart that summer.

Love Remains won the Grammy for Best Contemporary Christian Music Album and "Thy Will" won for Best Contemporary Christian Music Performance/Song at the 59th Annual Grammy Awards.

== Background and recording ==
In 2011, following the passing of Hillary Scott's grandfather, W.M. Scott Jr., the Scott family leaned on their faith and used traditional hymns to comfort one another. They began recording the songs with the intention of sharing those messages of joy with friends and family. This project eventually developed into a full-length album which includes classic hymns, popular Contemporary Christian songs, and newly-written original tracks such as the project's lead single, "Thy Will". This song was inspired by a miscarriage Scott experienced in 2015 while on tour. The family reached out to Ricky Skaggs to produce the album and Skaggs additionally provided instrumentation and guest vocals. Christian musicians Steven Curtis Chapman and Cheryl White also make appearances.

== Singles ==
"Thy Will", one of three tracks co-written by Scott, was released to digital retailers, country radio, and Christian radio on April 22, 2016, as the album's lead single. Its music video premiered June 20, 2016. The song has since reached 27 on the Hot Country Songs chart and number one on the Hot Christian Songs chart.

=== Other songs ===
"Beautiful Messes", "Love Remains", and "Still" all debuted on the Hot Christian Songs chart following the album's release at 28, 38, and 50, respectively.

== Commercial performance ==
Love Remains debuted at number 7 on the Billboard 200 with 28,000 units sold in its first week. It was the fourth best-selling album of the week. The album also debuted at numbers one and 2 on the Top Christian Albums and Top Country Albums charts, respectively. The album has sold 165,000 copies in the United States as of December 2017.

Internationally, the album debuted at number 69 in Canada and at number 81 in Australia.

== Track listing ==
No.	Title	Writer(s)	Length
1.	"Beautiful Messes"	Ben Glover; Connie Harrington; Hillary Scott	3:53
2.	"Still"	Justin Ebach; Molly Reed	3:24
3.	"Sheltered in the Arms of God"	Jimmie Davis; Dottie Rambo	4:44
4.	"Safe Haven"	Jimmy Fortune; Sydni Perry; H. Scott; Bill Whyte	4:02
5.	"The Faithful Love of Jesus" (featuring Steven Curtis Chapman and Ricky Skaggs)	Barry Dean; Don Poythress; Karyn Rochelle	4:17
6.	"The River (Come On Down)" (featuring Cheryl White)	Jordan Feliz; Jeff Pardo	4:05
7.	"Thy Will"	Bernie Herms; H. Scott; Emily Weisband	3:56
8.	"Untitled Hymn (Come to Jesus)"	Chris Rice	3:57
9.	"Love Remains"	Jim Daddario; Tom Douglas	3:56
10.	"We March On"	Linda Davis; Poythress; Lang Scott; Kenna Turner West	3:42
11.	"Your Unfailing Love"	Worley Max McKinney; Glenn Warren	2:35
12.	"Come Thou Fount"	Robert Robinson; Traditional	4:13
13.	"Ain't No Grave" (featuring Cheryl White)	Hank Bentley; David Crowder; Seth Philpott	4:47
Total length:			52:09

== Charts ==
=== Weekly charts ===
Chart (2016)	Peak position
Australian Albums (ARIA)	81
Canadian Albums (Billboard)	69
US Billboard 200	7
US Top Christian Albums (Billboard)	1
US Top Country Albums (Billboard)	2

=== Year end charts ===
Chart (2016)	Position
US Christian Albums (Billboard)	9
US Country Albums (Billboard)	26

== Release history ==
List of release dates, showing region, formats, label, catalog number and reference
Country	Date	Format	Label	Catalog No.	Ref.
Worldwide	July 29, 2016	CD	EMI Nashville	002505602	
Worldwide	July 29, 2016	Digital download	Capitol Nashville; Decca	—N/a	
Worldwide	November 11, 2016	Vinyl	Capitol Nashville	002572401	
