= A Love Story in the Making =

Single by Linda Davis

from the album Some Things Are Meant to Be
- B-side: "What Do I Know"
- Released: April 13, 1996
- Genre: Country
- Length: 3:40
- Label: Arista
- Songwriter(s): Al Anderson, Craig Wiseman
- Producer(s): John Guess

Linda Davis singles chronology
"Some Things Are Meant to Be" (1995)	"A Love Story in the Making" (1996)	"Walk Away" (1996)

"A Love Story in the Making" is a song recorded by American country music artist Linda Davis. It was released in April 1996 as the second single from the album Some Things Are Meant to Be. The song reached #33 on the Billboard Hot Country Singles & Tracks chart. The song was written by Al Anderson and Craig Wiseman.

== Chart performance ==
Chart (1996)	Peak position
US Hot Country Songs (Billboard)	33
Canadian RPM Country Tracks	22
