= She Ain't Your Ordinary Girl =

Single by Alabama

from the album In Pictures
- B-side: "Heartbreak Express"
- Released: June 19, 1995
- Recorded: January 1, 1994
- Genre: Country
- Length: 2:53 (single edit) 3:07 (album version)
- Label: RCA Nashville
- Songwriter: Robert Jason
- Producers: Emory Gordy Jr. Alabama

Alabama singles chronology
"Give Me One More Shot" (1995)	"She Ain't Your Ordinary Girl" (1995)	"In Pictures" (1995)

"She Ain't Your Ordinary Girl" is a song written by Robert Jason, and recorded by American country music group Alabama. It was released in June 1995 as the lead-off single to their album In Pictures. It peaked at number 2 on the United States Billboard Hot Country Singles & Tracks chart, behind "Not on Your Love" by Jeff Carson, while it was a number-one hit in Canada.

== Critical reception ==
Deborah Evans Price, of Billboard magazine had a mixed review saying that "Randy Owen's vocals never fail to infuse a song with warmth and personality." She went on to say that the song doesn't seem to be at the level of the band's previous singles.

== Chart positions ==
"She Ain't Your Ordinary Girl" debuted at number 54 on the U.S. Billboard Hot Country Singles & Tracks for the week of July 1, 1995.

Chart (1995)	Peak position
Canada Country Singles (RPM)	1
US Hot Country Songs (Billboard)	2

=== Year-end charts ===
Chart (1995)	Position
Canada Country Tracks (RPM)	54
US Country Songs (Billboard)	48
