= Daddy's Money =

Single by Ricochet

from the album Ricochet
- B-side: "I Wasn't Ready for You"
- Released: April 22, 1996
- Genre: Country
- Length: 3:03
- Label: Columbia
- Songwriters: Bob DiPiero; Mark D. Sanders; Steve Seskin
- Producers: Ron Chancey; Ed Seay

Ricochet singles chronology
"What Do I Know" (1995)	"Daddy's Money" (1996)	"Love Is Stronger Than Pride" (1996)

"Daddy's Money" is a song recorded by American country music group Ricochet. It was released in April 1996 as the second single from their self-titled debut album. The song reached Number One on the Billboard Hot Country Singles & Tracks chart in July 1996, the band's only chart topper. The song was written by Bob DiPiero, Mark D. Sanders, and Steve Seskin.

== Critical reception ==
In a review of the band's career, Billboard magazine called the song an "infectious uptempo romp."

== Music video ==
This was their first music video, and it was directed by Marc Ball. It premiered on CMT on April 24, 1996 during The CMT Delivery Room. A portion of their debut single "What Do I Know" is played at the beginning of the video.

== Chart performance ==
"Daddy's Money" debuted at number 63 on the U.S. Billboard Hot Country Singles & Tracks for the week of April 27, 1996.

Chart (1996)	Peak Position
Canada Country Singles (RPM)	3
US Hot Country Songs (Billboard)	1

=== Year-end charts ===
Chart (1996)	Position
Canada Country Tracks (RPM)	57
US Country Songs (Billboard)	4
