= It Works =

Single by Alabama

from the album In Pictures
- B-side: "Katy Brought My Guitar Back Today"
- Released: January 13, 1996
- Genre: Country
- Length: 3:40
- Label: RCA Nashville
- Songwriters: Mickey Cates, Mark Alan Springer
- Producers: Emory Gordy Jr., Alabama

Alabama singles chronology
"In Pictures" (1995)	"It Works" (1996)	"Say I" (1996)

"It Works" is a song written by Mickey Cates and Mark Alan Springer, and recorded by American country music group Alabama. It was released in January 1996 as the third single from the album In Pictures. The song reached number 19 on the Billboard Hot Country Singles & Tracks chart.

== Music video ==
A music video was made for this song and was released in early 1996.

== Chart performance ==
Chart (1996)	Peak position
Canada Country Singles (RPM)	17
US Hot Country Songs (Billboard)	19
