= What a Woman Wants to Hear =

Studio album by Dawn Sears
- Released: October 15, 1991
- Genre: Country
- Length: 33:05
- Label: Warner Bros.
- Producer: Barry Beckett

Dawn Sears chronology
What a Woman Wants to Hear (1991)	Nothin' but Good (1994)

Professional ratings
Review scores
Source	Rating
Entertainment Weekly	B+
AllMusic	4.5/5 stars

What a Woman Wants to Hear is the debut album of American country music singer Dawn Sears. It was released in 1991 via Warner Bros. Records. The tracks "Till You Come Back to Me" and "Good Goodbye" were released as singles.

== Critical reception ==
Giving it a "B+", Alanna Nash of Entertainment Weekly praised Sears' "emotive" voice, comparing her favorably to Reba McEntire and Shelby Lynne. She also wrote that the album contained a "solid repertoire".

Michael McCall of AllMusic writes, "Her powerful debut, produced by Barry Beckett, it reveals her ability with a forceful country rocker ("Good Goodbye") as well as a touching ballad ("Till You Come Back to Me.")"

== Track listing ==
No.	Title	Writer(s)	Length
1.	"What a Woman Wants to Hear"	Lisa Silver; Mark D. Sanders; Linda Davis	3:56
2.	"Half as Much"	Curley Williams	2:53
3.	"Tell Me I'm Crazy"	Mike Reid; Rory Bourke	3:35
4.	"Old-Fashioned Broken Heart"	Donny Kees; Terri Sharp	3:43
5.	"Good Goodbye"	Paulette Carlson; Bob DiPiero; Pat McManus	2:50
6.	"He's in Dallas"	Donny Kees; Richard Ross; Johnny MacRae	3:07
7.	"No More Tears"	Vip Vipperman; Ted Hewitt; Buddy Blackmon	2:41
8.	"Till You Come Back to Me"	Reid; Troy Seals	2:35
9.	"Could Be the Mississippi"	Susan Longacre; Russell Smith	4:14
10.	"Odds and Ends (Bits and Pieces)"	Harlan Howard	3:31
Total length:			33:05

== Personnel ==
Compiled from liner notes.

Musicians

- Eddie Bayers — drums
- Barry Beckett — keyboards
- Paul Franklin — steel guitar
- Sonny Garrish — steel guitar
- Steve Gibson — electric guitar
- Dann Huff — electric guitar
- Mitch Humphries — keyboards
- Mike Lawler — keyboards
- Danny Parks — electric guitar
- Dave Pomeroy — bass guitar
- Don Potter — acoustic guitar
- Matt Rollings — keyboards
- Brent Rowan — electric guitar
- Dawn Sears — lead vocals, background vocals
- Kenny Sears — fiddle
- Jack Williams — bass guitar
- Dennis Wilson — background vocals
- Curtis Young — background vocals
- Reggie Young — electric guitar

Technical

- Barry Beckett — production
- Pete Greene — recording, mixing
- Justin Niebank — recording, mixing
- Denny Purcell — mastering
- Ragena Warren — production coordination
