= What You Leave Behind (album) =

Studio album by Ricochet
- Released: September 12, 2000
- Genre: Country
- Label: Columbia
- Producer: Ron Chancey, Blake Chancey, David Malloy

Ricochet chronology
Blink of an Eye (1997)	What You Leave Behind (2000)	The Live Album (2004)

Professional ratings
Review scores
Source	Rating
Allmusic	3/5 stars

What You Leave Behind is the third studio album by the American country music band Ricochet. It was released in 2000 on Columbia Records.

The album, originally titled What a Ride, was to have been released in 1998, and although three singles from the original album ("Honky Tonk Baby", "Can't Stop Thinkin' 'bout That" and a cover of Steve Young's "Seven Bridges Road") were all released from the original album, all three failed to make Top 40. "Honky Tonk Baby" and "Can't Stop Thinkin' 'Bout That" did not make the final cut, although "You Beat All I've Ever Seen", the final track on this album, is the B-side of "Can't Stop Thinkin' 'Bout That". "Do I Love You Enough" was released in 2000, peaking at #45 on the US country charts, followed by "She's Gone", the band's last chart single, at #48. In between "Seven Bridges Road" and "Do I Love You Enough", drummer Jeff Bryant and steel guitarist Teddy Carr both left the band as well. Also covered on the album is "Why You Been Gone So Long", previously a hit in 1969 for Johnny Darrell.

== Track listing ==
1. "She's Gone" (Michael Dulaney, Jeffrey Steele, John Hobbs) – 3:10
2. "Do I Love You Enough" (Richard Fagan, Lisa Palas) – 2:59
3. "What You Leave Behind" (Dulaney, Neil Thrasher, Heath Wright) – 3:32
4. "I Can't Believe You Let Her Go" (Stephony Smith, Craig Wiseman) – 3:27
5. "Baby Hold On" (Eddie Kilgallon, Deryl Dodd) – 3:40
6. "Seven Bridges Road" (Steve Young) – 3:06
7. "Why You Been Gone So Long" (Mickey Newbury) – 3:00
8. "Fall of the Year" (Tom Paden, Lenny Wallace) – 3:10
9. "Love Is a Serious Thing" (Thrasher, Jack Sundrud) – 3:24
10. "You Beat All I've Ever Seen" (Steve Bogard, Greg Cook, Jeff Stevens) – 3:39

== Musicians ==
- Richard "Spady" Brannon - bass guitar
- Dennis Burnside - keyboards
- Eric Darken - percussion
- Larry Franklin - fiddle
- Paul Leim - drums
- B. James Lowry - acoustic guitar
- Jerry McPherson - electric guitar
- Greg Morrow - drums
- Jimmy Nichols - keyboards
- Billy Panda - acoustic guitar
- Michael Rhodes - bass guitar
- Tom Roady - percussion
- Brent Rowan - electric guitar
- Bruce Bouton - steel guitar
- Paul Franklin - steel guitar

Robby Turner-steel guitar

Sonny Garrish-pedabro on "Seven Bridges Road"

== Chart performance ==
Chart (2000)	Peak position
U.S. Billboard Top Country Albums	71
