= Dodson, Texas =

- Town
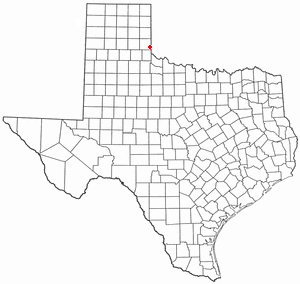
- Location of Dodson, Texas

- Coordinates: 34°45′55″N 100°01′14″W
- Country: United States
- State: Texas
- County: Collingsworth

Government
  - Type: Mayor-council government
  - Mayor: Steve Kane

Area
  - Total: 0.61 sq mi (1.58 km^{2})
  - Land: 0.61 sq mi (1.58 km^{2})
  - Water: 0 sq mi (0.00 km^{2})
- Elevation: 1,791 ft (546 m)

Population (2020)
  - Total: 93
  - Density: 150/sq mi (59/km^{2})
- Time zone: UTC-6 (Central (CST))
  - Summer (DST): UTC-5 (CDT)
- ZIP code: 79230
- Area code: 806
- FIPS code: 48-20716
- GNIS feature ID: 2412437

Dodson is a town in Collingsworth County, Texas, United States. The population was 93 at the 2020 census, down from 109 at the 2010 census.

== Geography ==
Dodson is located near the southeastern corner of Collingsworth County. Dodson is 1.25 miles (2.01 km) west of the 100th meridian west (the Texas-Oklahoma border), one mile (1.6 km) north of the Childress County line, 13 miles (21 km) southeast of Wellington and 12 miles (19 km) northwest of Hollis, Oklahoma.

According to the U.S. Census Bureau, Dodson has a total area of 0.62 square miles (1.6 km^{2}), all land.

== Demographics ==
Historical population
Census	Pop.	Note	%±
1930	426		—
1940	357		−16.2%
1950	336		−5.9%
1960	308		−8.3%
1970	239		−22.4%
1980	185		−22.6%
1990	113		−38.9%
2000	115		1.8%
2010	109		−5.2%
2020	93		−14.7%
U.S. Decennial Census

As of the census of 2000, there were 115 people, 53 households, and 34 families residing in the town. The population density was 189.8 inhabitants per square mile (73.3/km^{2}). There were 65 housing units at an average density of 107.3 per square mile (41.4/km^{2}). The racial makeup of the town was 84.35% White, 2.61% Native American, 0.87% Asian, 9.57% from other races, and 2.61% from two or more races. Hispanic or Latino of any race were 13.04% of the population.

There were 53 households, out of which 24.5% had children under the age of 18 living with them, 56.6% were married couples living together, 3.8% had a female householder with no husband present, and 34.0% were non-families. 32.1% of all households were made up of individuals, and 13.2% had someone living alone who was 65 years of age or older. The average household size was 2.17 and the average family size was 2.69.

In the town, the age distribution of the population shows 19.1% under the age of 18, 8.7% from 18 to 24, 18.3% from 25 to 44, 38.3% from 45 to 64, and 15.7% who were 65 years of age or older. The median age was 46 years. For every 100 females, there were 121.2 males. For every 100 females age 18 and over, there were 121.4 males.

The median income for a household in the town was $15,625, and the median income for a family was $21,250. Males had a median income of $19,063 versus $16,250 for females. The per capita income for the town was $11,213. There were 31.0% of families and 32.5% of the population living below the poverty line, including 18.2% of under eighteens and 48.3% of those over 64.

== History ==
The city of Dodsonville was founded on July 1, 1910, by Frank Kell of Wichita Falls. The wealthy entrepreneur Kell was an important figure in promotion of the Wichita Falls and Northwestern Railway, and the city was established as a stop on the Wellington Branch of the railroad. Elmore Dodson, a local pioneer and rancher, donated the 200-acre (0.81 km^{2}) town site to ensure the railroad's passing through the southeastern part of the county. Other town sites had been proposed, including the community of Arlie located 5 miles (8 km) southwest of Dodson, but the grant given by Mr. Dodson sealed the railroad's passage through southeastern Collingsworth County. In return, the new city was named for Dodson. A celebration was held on August 29, 1910, to commemorate the town's establishment. The gala celebration, complete with a picnic, marked the town's formal opening, and was attended by a trainload of people from Oklahoma.

N. L. Jones built the first residence and opened a cotton gin. The first store was operated by William T. McDowell, who was also the first postmaster. R. H. Miller established a hotel, and the town added a bank, a telephone exchange, and two churches. Three newspapers, all called the Dodsonville News, were published intermittently by three different men between January 1911 and December 1915. A fourth paper, the Dodsonville Messenger, was printed from 1928 until 1930. School was sometimes held in the churches until a permanent schoolhouse was completed in the fall of 1912; the previous school was located 3 miles (5 km) northwest of town.

Dodson was incorporated in the 1920s and by 1930 had 25 businesses and a population of 426. Public Works Administration appropriations enabled the town to install a $52,000 water system during the 1930s, and a volunteer fire department was organized. In 1947 a new consolidated high school served neighboring communities in Oklahoma as well as Dodson. The population dropped to 357 in 1940; this decline, attributed to decreased agricultural activity and a renewed interest in cattle raising, continued into the 1990s. In 1984 Dodson remained the county's second largest town, with a population of 185, one business, and four churches. In 1990 the population was 113, and in 2000 it was 115.

The city's name was officially changed from "Dodsonville" to "Dodson" on July 1, 1937.

Dodson's first permanent school building was completed in 1912. This school was used until 1947 when a new school was constructed. Dodson High School continued to educated students until 1969 when the school board voted to consolidate the Dodson School District with that of Wellington. The elementary and junior high schools continued to operate until 1972. The Dodson School was destroyed in the late 1980s or early 1990s.

== Economy ==
Dodson serves as an agricultural center for southeastern Collingsworth County, northeastern Childress County, Texas, and western Harmon County, Oklahoma.

Cotton, wheat, sorghum, and peanuts are the primary crops of the region. There are also a large number of small ranching operations in the surrounding area.

Tri-County Co-Op operates a cotton gin located in Dodson that serves the surrounding tri-county area. It is one of the town's few businesses.

== Education ==
Public education in Dodson is provided by the Wellington Independent School District.
