= In a Different Light (Linda Davis album) =

Studio album by Linda Davis
- Released: January 29, 1991
- Studio: Sound Stage Studios and Masterfonics (Nashville, Tennessee)
- Genre: Country
- Length: 33:24
- Label: Capitol Nashville
- Producer: Jimmy Bowen; Linda Davis

Linda Davis chronology
In a Different Light (1991)	Linda Davis (1992)

Professional ratings
Review scores
Source	Rating
AllMusic	4.5/5 stars

In a Different Light is the début album of American country music artist Linda Davis. It was released in 1991 on Capitol Nashville. Singles released from the album include, in order: the title track, "Some Kinda Woman", and "Three Way Tie". "In a Different Light" peaked at number 61 on the Hot Country Songs charts, while "Some Kinda Woman" peaked at number 68.

== Track listing ==
1. "In a Different Light" (Ed Hill, Jonathan Yudkin) – 3:29
2. "Some Kinda Woman" (Annette Cotter, David Leonard) – 3:25
3. "Three Way Tie" (Mary Beth Anderson, Lisa Silver, Carol Grace Anderson) – 3:31
4. "From Him to Here" (Mark D. Sanders, Verlon Thompson) – 2:49
5. "If Your Greener Grass Turns Blue" (Cindy Greene, Marsha Spears) – 2:58
6. "There's a Problem at the Office" (Annette Cotter, Kim Tribble) – 3:08
7. "Knowin' We'll Never Know" (Jim Rushing, James Dean Hicks) – 3:12
8. "White Collar Man" (Vernon Rust) – 3:08
9. "The Crash of 29" (Ron Moore, Billy Henderson) – 3:03
10. "If I Could Only Be Like You" (Kendall Franceschi, Quentin Powers, Reba McEntire) – 4:24

== Personnel ==
From In a Different Light liner notes.

Musicians and Vocals

- Linda Davis – lead vocals, backing vocals
- Bill Cuomo – keyboards, synthesizers
- John Barlow Jarvis – acoustic piano
- Larry Byrom – electric guitars, acoustic guitars
- Brent Rowan – electric guitars
- Billy Joe Walker, Jr. – electric guitars, acoustic guitars, classical acoustic guitar
- Reggie Young – electric guitars
- Michael Rhodes – bass
- Glenn Worf – bass
- Rick Marotta – drums
- John Catchings – cello
- Lisa Silver – violin, backing vocals
- Vince Gill – backing vocals
- Harry Stinson – backing vocals

Production

- Jimmy Bowen – producer
- Linda Davis – producer
- Russ Martin – recording, overdubbing
- John Guess – mixing
- Tim Kish – overdubbing, mix assistant
- David Boyer – recording assistant, overdub assistant, mix assistant
- Marty Williams – recording assistant, overdub assistant
- Milan Bogdan – digital editing
- Glenn Meadows – mastering
- Ray Pillow – song selection assistance
- Simon Levy – art direction, design
- Jim "Señor" McGuire – photography
- Profile – stylists
- Narvel Blackstock – management
