= Thy Will =

Single by Hillary Scott

Single by Hillary Scott & the Scott Family

from the album Love Remains
- Released: April 22, 2016
- Genre: Christian country; gospel; CCM
- Length: 3:57
- Label: EMI Nashville; Capitol Nashville
- Songwriters: Bernie Herms; Hillary Scott; Emily Weisband
- Producers: Ricky Skaggs; Bernie Herms

Hillary Scott singles chronology
"Christmas Tonight" (2010)	"Thy Will" (2016)	"Still" (2017)

The Scott Family singles chronology
"Thy Will" (2016)	"Still" (2017)

"Thy Will" is a Christian country song recorded by American singer and songwriter Hillary Scott for her collaborative album with the Scott Family, Love Remains (2016). Scott co-wrote the faith-affirming song with Bernie Herms and Emily Weisband. It was released April 22, 2016 as the lead single from the record and impacted Christian and country radio formats.

Commercially, "Thy Will" was a moderate crossover hit; it reached the top of the Billboard Hot Christian Songs chart in July 2016 and also reached 27 on the magazine's Hot Country Songs chart. Scott had previously experienced success in the country music genre as a member of the popular trio Lady A.

It won Best Contemporary Christian Music Performance/Song at the 59th Annual Grammy Awards.

== Composition ==
"Thy Will" was produced by Ricky Skaggs with assistance from Bernie Herms and lasts for three minutes and fifty-seven seconds. The ballad is built on a piano melody and an orchestral arrangement that draws on elements of gospel music. As the song progresses, the backing instrumental builds to "keep up with her emotions," until it reaches its "swell" at the bridge. According to the sheet music published by Alfred Publishing Company, "Thy Will" is set in compound duple time (6/8) with a "gentle" tempo of approximately 55 BPM. It is composed in the key of C minor and follows a chord progression of Cm–B♭–Gm–A♭, with Scott's vocals ranging from the note of E♭_{3} to C_{5}.

Lyrically, "Thy Will" is a plea for explanation from God about difficulties facing the narrator. Written by Scott after experiencing a miscarriage in 2015, the song finds her learning to accept her circumstances and move forward knowing that God has a plan. The hook, "thy will be done," was derived from Scott's own prayers around the time of her loss.

== Reception ==
=== Critical ===
The staff of country music blog, Taste of Country, wrote that "it's the arrangement that truly sets this song apart from anything on the radio or in country music right now," while praising Scott's vulnerability and the song's spiritual message.

=== Commercial ===
"Thy Will" entered the Billboard Hot Christian Songs chart at No. 6 on the chart date May 14, 2016. It debuted at No. 2 and No. 31 on the Christian Digital Songs and Christian Airplay component charts, respectively. The song reached the top spot on the Hot Christian Songs chart dated July 30, 2016. It also reached No. 1 on Christian Airplay, on the chart dated September 24, 2016. On the country music charts, "Thy Will" entered the Hot Country Songs at No. 33 on the chart date May 14, 2016. It debuted at No. 22 on the Country Digital Songs component chart, with 11,000 units sold. "Thy Will" has since reached a peak position of No. 27 on the Country Songs chart dated October 1, 2016. The song has not entered the Billboard Hot 100 but did debut and peak at No. 12 on the Bubbling Under Hot 100 Singles extension chart. "Thy Will" has sold 248,000 copies in the United States as of January 2017.

== Music video ==
An accompanying music video was directed by Shane Drake and premiered June 20, 2016. The video sees Scott isolated in the woods, where she comes across a knotted rope in a stream. Flashes of thorns, as well as the knots in the rope, are interpreted by Jon Freeman of Rolling Stone to be symbolic of the struggles Scott's character faces, with her eventual disentanglement representing her rising above the tragedy. The music video has reached over 20 million views as of October 2020.

== Chart performance ==
=== Weekly charts ===
Chart (2016)	Peak position
US Bubbling Under Hot 100 (Billboard)	12
US Christian Airplay (Billboard)	1
US Hot Christian Songs (Billboard)	1
US Hot Country Songs (Billboard)	27

=== Year end charts ===
Chart (2016)	Position
US Christian AC Songs (Billboard)	13
US Christian Airplay (Billboard)	10
US Christian Songs (Billboard)	4
US Hot Country Songs (Billboard)	82
Chart (2017)	Position
US Christian AC Songs (Billboard)	30

=== Decade-end charts ===
Chart (2010s)	Position
US Christian Songs (Billboard)	15
