= I Wanna Remember This =

Single by Linda Davis

from the album Black Dog soundtrack
- Released: May 16, 1998
- Genre: Country
- Length: 3:43
- Label: Decca Nashville
- Songwriters: Jennifer Kimball; Annie Roboff
- Producers: Wally Wilson; James Stroud

Linda Davis singles chronology
"Walk Away" (1996)	"I Wanna Remember This" (1998)	"I'm Yours" (1998)

"I Wanna Remember This" is a song written by Jennifer Kimball and Annie Roboff, and recorded by American country music artist Linda Davis. It was released in May 1998 and as included on the soundtrack to the 1998 film Black Dog. The song reached number 20 on the Billboard Hot Country Singles & Tracks chart.

== Music video ==
The music video was directed by John Miller and R. Brad Murano and premiered in April 1998.

== Chart performance ==
Chart (1998)	Peak position
Canada Country Singles (RPM)	31
US Hot Country Songs (Billboard)	20
