= Some Things Are Meant to Be (song) =

Single by Linda Davis

from the album Some Things Are Meant to Be
- B-side: "There Isn't One"
- Released: December 2, 1995
- Genre: Country
- Length: 3:29
- Label: Arista
- Songwriters: Michael Garvin, Gordon Payne
- Producer: John Guess

Linda Davis singles chronology
"Love Didn't Do It" (1994)	"Some Things Are Meant to Be" (1995)	"A Love Story in the Making" (1996)

"Some Things Are Meant to Be" is a song written by Michael Garvin and Gordon Payne, and recorded by American country music artist Linda Davis. It was released in December 1995 as the first single and title track from the album Some Things Are Meant to Be. The song reached number 13 on the Billboard Hot Country Singles & Tracks chart.

== Critical reception ==
Deborah Evans Price of Billboard gave the song a positive review, saying that it "starts off with a haunting and edgy feel", and "could take this talented artist to the next level."

== Chart performance ==
Chart (1995–1996)	Peak position
Canada Country Singles (RPM)	13
US Hot Country Songs (Billboard)	13
