= Black Dog (1998 film) =

- Theatrical release poster
- Directed by: Kevin Hooks
- Written by: William Mickelberry; Dan Vining
- Produced by: Peter Saphier; Mark W. Koch; Raffaella De Laurentiis
- Starring: Patrick Swayze; Randy Travis; Meat Loaf; Stephen Tobolowsky; Charles Dutton
- Cinematography: Buzz Feitshans IV
- Edited by: Debra Neil-Fisher; Sabrina Plisco-Morris
- Music by: George S. Clinton
- Production companies: Mutual Film Company; Prelude Pictures
- Distributed by: Universal Pictures
- Release date: May 1, 1998
- Running time: 97 minutes
- Country: United States
- Language: English
- Box office: $12,951,088

Black Dog is a 1998 American action thriller film directed by Kevin Hooks and starring Patrick Swayze. The film tells the story of a trucker and ex-con who is manipulated into transporting illegal arms. The film co-stars popular American singers Randy Travis and Meat Loaf.

== Plot ==
FBI and ATF agents pursue a truck carrying illegal guns. The result is the death of the driver, which leads to a disagreement between agencies on involvement with the case.

Meanwhile, truck driver Jack Crews is released from jail after serving time for vehicular manslaughter. He had accidentally hit and killed a motorist and his passenger while experiencing a Black Dog hallucination (a herald of destruction for truckers) brought on by exhaustion. Along with his imprisonment, he also lost his Commercial driver's license. Following his release, he attempts to return to a normal life while working as a truck mechanic for a repair shop in New Jersey, unable to drive himself. His manager, Frank Cutler, offers him a job driving toilets from Atlanta to New Jersey for $10,000. Realizing that his house will be repossessed unless he pays off his debt, Jack reluctantly takes the job.

He flies down to Atlanta to meet up with Red, who runs the trucking yard. Red initially gives Jack a brand-new truck to haul the load, but Jack chooses an older one (more specifically, a Peterbilt 379) so as not to draw too much attention. He is accompanied on the trip by Earl, with Sonny and Wes following in Sonny's car (a Chevrolet Camaro) for policy protection. En route to New Jersey, the quartet experience run-ins with Red and his crew as they attempt to hijack the load, in retaliation for the failed negotiations with Cutler about money. Jack eventually learns that his load also contains illegal guns (over $3,000,000 worth, according to ATF), and that Wes has been informing Red of their whereabouts throughout the trip. Jack also discovers that Sonny is an FBI agent when he is shot and killed by Red during another hijack attempt, and that the FBI was tracking their whereabouts as well.

Cutler takes Jack's wife Melanie and daughter Tracy hostage to ensure that Crews will complete the job. When they make it to Maryland, Jack formulates a plan to turn over the guns to the FBI and save his family. Wes, at this point, has gone his separate way, while Earl decides to stay on until the end. Jack puts the FBI tracking device on the truck that Wes is leaving on and eventually the FBI pulls over the truck to realize it is the wrong one. However, Jack calls Agent Allen Ford, who is leading the case, on Wes's cell phone, revealing his plan to meet him at a loading dock in Jersey. Cutler will be there to exchange the guns for Jack's family.

When the meeting occurs, the FBI arrives and a shootout occurs with Cutler's men. Jack manages to catch Cutler before he can escape and turns him over to the FBI. As a token of gratitude, the FBI gives Jack his commercial driver's license back, and also tells the Crewses that their house will not be foreclosed, in return for his assistance during the operation and they thank him for bringing Sonny's body back. He is also given the key to drive the truck one last time to the impound lot. Jack thanks Earl, who was wounded in the shootout, for staying. In return, Earl tells Jack to take care of his dog, Tiny (a pit bull riding in the trailer as a guard), until he heals and everything is sorted out.

As the Crewses leave the docks for the impound lot, they are intercepted by Red, who makes one last attempt at Jack's life. However, their slamming into each other causes Red to lose control of his truck, which then repeatedly flips over before getting hit by a train and exploding. After Jack checks on his family, he continues driving the truck to the impound lot.

== Cast ==
- Patrick Swayze as Jack Crews
- Randy Travis as Earl
- Meat Loaf as 'Red'
- Gabriel Casseus as Sonny Boxer
- Brian Vincent as Wes
- Graham Beckel as Frank Cutler
- Brenda Strong as Melanie Crews
- Rusty DeWees as Junior
- Cyril O'Reilly as Vince
- Erin Broderick as Tracy Crews
- Charles Dutton as FBI Agent Allen Ford
- Stephen Tobolowsky as ATF Agent McClaren
- Lorraine Toussaint as FBI Agent Avery

== Production ==
Prior to the casting of Swayze, the film was initially intended as a vehicle for Kevin Sorbo During an interview, Sorbo described the film as "Die Hard meets Speed."

In July 1997, it was announced that Sorbo would star in Black Dog for around $3 million with Kevin Hooks slated to direct and produce with the intention to shoot in September during Sorbo's hiatus from Hercules: The Legendary Journeys. In September, Meat Loaf and Randy Travis were signed to star opposite Sorbo.

By November of that year, it was reported that Patrick Swayze would star in Black Dog.

== Reception ==
Black Dog received negative reviews by critics, earning a 15% approval rating on Rotten Tomatoes based on 20 reviews. It has received cult status among film enthusiasts and RADwood car enthusiasts alike, as one of the last action road movies to use practical effects, signifying the end of an era.

Audiences polled by CinemaScore gave the film an average grade of "C+" on an A+ to F scale.

== Soundtrack ==
Black Dog

Soundtrack album by Various artists
- Released: April 1998
- Genre: Country
- Length: 44:07
- Label: Decca
- Producer: Various original producers; compilation produced by Ken Downie, Ed Handley, Andy Turner

Singles from Black Dog soundtrack
- 1. "Drivin' My Life Away" Released: April 1998; 2. "I Wanna Remember This" Released: May 16, 1998

A soundtrack album for the film, featuring various country music artists, was released in April 1998 via Decca Records Nashville. It peaked at number 30 on Top Country Albums.

=== Content and reception ===
Thom Owens gave the soundtrack a mixed review in Allmusic, praising the performances of Randy Travis, David Lee Murphy and Rhett Akins.

Among the cuts on the soundtrack, Rhett Akins' "Drivin' My Life Away" (a cover of Eddie Rabbitt) and Linda Davis's "I Wanna Remember This" were both released as singles. Patty Loveless' "On Down the Line" was previously a single from her 1990 album of the same name, and Steve Earle's "Nowhere Road" was a single from his 1987 album Exit 0. David Lee Murphy's "We Can't All Be Angels" also appeared on his 1997 album of the same name, Lee Ann Womack's "A Man with 18 Wheels" previously appeared on her 1997 self-titled debut, Big House's "Road Man" previously appeared on their 1997 self-titled debut, and Chris Knight's "The Hammer Going Down" appeared on his 1998 self-titled debut. "Highway Junkie", recorded here by Gary Allan, was previously recorded by Randy Travis on his 1996 album Full Circle.

=== Track listing ===
No.	Title	Writer(s)	Performer	Length
1.	"A Man with 18 Wheels"	Bobby Carmichael, Leslie Satcher	Lee Ann Womack	3:20
2.	"Drivin' My Life Away"	David Malloy, Eddie Rabbitt, Even Stevens	Rhett Akins	3:44
3.	"Road Man"	Monty Byrom, Scott Hutchison, David Kaffinetti, Ira Walker	Big House	6:08
4.	"Highway Junkie"	Chris Knight, Annie Tate, Sam Tate	Gary Allan	3:25
5.	"The Hammer Going Down"	Knight, Dean Miller	Chris Knight	5:30
6.	"We Can't All Be Angels"	David Lee Murphy, Danny Tate	David Lee Murphy	4:18
7.	"My Greatest Fear"	Randy Travis, Brian Vincent (director)	Randy Travis	3:13
8.	"On Down the Line"	Kostas	Patty Loveless	3:09
9.	"Nowhere Road"	Steve Earle, Reno Kling	Steve Earle	2:49
10.	"Drivin' All Night Long"	Bruce Robison	Jack Ingram	4:38
11.	"I Wanna Remember This"	Jennifer Kimball, Annie Roboff	Linda Davis	3:53
Total length:				44:07
