= What Do I Know =

Single by Ricochet

from the album Ricochet
- B-side: "Little Bit of Love"
- Released: December 4, 1995
- Genre: Country
- Length: 3:34
- Label: Columbia
- Songwriters: Stephony Smith; Sunny Russ; Cathy Majeski
- Producers: Ron Chancey; Ed Seay

Ricochet singles chronology
"What Do I Know" (1995)	"Daddy's Money" (1996)

"What Do I Know" is a song recorded by American country music band Ricochet. It was released on December 4, 1995, as their debut single, and was served as the first single from their self-titled debut album. The song reached #5 on the Billboard Hot Country Singles & Tracks chart in April 1996. It was written by Stephony Smith, Sunny Russ and Cathy Majeski.

== Critical reception ==
In a summary of the band's career, Billboard magazine called the song a "harmony-laden ballad."

== Charts ==
=== Weekly charts ===
Chart (1995–1996)	Peak position
Canada Country Singles (RPM)	21
US Hot Country Songs (Billboard)	5

=== Year-end charts ===
Chart (1996)	Position
US Country Songs (Billboard)	69

== Other recordings ==
- "What Do I Know" was recorded by country singer Linda Davis, appearing on her 1996 album Some Things Are Meant to Be.
