= Love Is Stronger Than Pride (Ricochet song) =

Single by Ricochet

from the album Ricochet
- B-side: "I Wasn't Ready for You"
- Released: August 5, 1996
- Genre: Country
- Length: 3:12
- Label: Columbia
- Songwriters: Rick Bowles; Doug Johnson
- Producers: Ron Chancey; Ed Seay

Ricochet singles chronology
"Daddy's Money" (1996)	"Love Is Stronger Than Pride" (1996)	"Ease My Troubled Mind" (1997)

"Love Is Stronger Than Pride" is a song written by Rick Bowles and Doug Johnson, and recorded by American country music group Ricochet. It was released in August 1996 as the third single from their self-titled debut album. The song reached number 9 on the Billboard Hot Country Singles & Tracks chart in November 1996.

== Music video ==
The music video was directed by Marc Ball, and premiered on CMT on July 24, 1996.

== Chart performance ==
"Love Is Stronger Than Pride" debuted at number 66 on the U.S. Billboard Hot Country Singles & Tracks for the week of August 17, 1996.

Chart (1996)	Peak position
Canada Country Singles (RPM)	10
US Hot Country Songs (Billboard)	9
