= Dawn Sears =

American country music singer-songwriter (1961–2014)

- Born: Dawn Marie Skari; December 7, 1961; Grand Forks, North Dakota, U.S.
- Died: December 11, 2014 (aged 53) Gallatin, Tennessee, U.S.
- Genres: Country
- Occupation: Singer-songwriter
- Instrument: Vocals
- Years active: 1990–2014
- Labels: Warner Bros., Decca Nashville
- Formerly of: The Time Jumpers
- Website: www.dawnsears.com

Dawn Sears (born Dawn Marie Skari; December 7, 1961 – December 11, 2014) was an American country music singer. In addition to her work as a backing vocalist in Vince Gill's band, she recorded four solo studio albums, of which two were released on major labels. She had one single that charted on the Billboard Hot Country Songs charts.

== Biography ==
Dawn Marie Skari was born in East Grand Forks, Minnesota. She began her career in 1990 with the album What a Woman Wants to Hear on Warner Bros. Records. The album produced two minor singles. Because of her debut album's poor performance, Sears had decided to leave the country music scene. However, she later received a call from Vince Gill, who had asked her to join his road band as a harmony vocalist. According to information provided by Thomas "Duke" Miller, a TV/movie/celebrity expert, in 1994 Sears was also known for her song "Another Dream Away", which became a hit theme song for the newer Bandit (film series) four television miniseries movies starring Brian Bloom, Sears is also featured in the opening title sequence performing the song playing her guitar, at the end, Sears is seen picking up her guitar case and suitcase as she prepares to walk the side of a country road hoping to hitch a ride. The four television miniseries movies served as a reboot set to cash in on the still ever popular Smokey and the Bandit (franchise).

In addition to singing harmony on Gill's 1992 album I Still Believe in You, Sears provided duet vocals on the track "An Out of Control Raging Fire" on Tracy Byrd's 1994 debut album. In 1994, she was signed as the first act on Decca Records' newly revived country music branch. Her second album, 1994's Nothin' But Good, was issued on Decca, and its lead-off single, "Runaway Train", entered the country music charts. Other singles from the album were unsuccessful, and Dawn exited Decca's roster not long afterward. A self-titled album was released independently in 2002, followed by her first Christmas album. Sears returned to her work as a backup vocalist for Gill. She made appearances on several of Gill's albums, including his 2003 album Next Big Thing. Sears also performed with The Time Jumpers.

In February 2012, Sears was diagnosed with lung cancer, which was diagnosed as Stage 3B in March 2013. She died in Gallatin, Tennessee on December 11, 2014, aged 53. Sears was married to Kenny Sears (a Time Jumpers bandmate), and had a daughter, Tess Sears (also known professionally as Tesla Dawn).

== Discography ==
=== Albums ===
Title	Album details
What a Woman Wants to Hear	Release date: October 15, 1991; Label: Warner Bros.
Nothin' but Good	Release date: August 30, 1994; Label: Decca Nashville
Dawn Sears	Release date: 2002; Label: self-released
A Christmas Dawn	Release date: 2002; Label: self-released

=== Singles ===
Year	Single	Peak positions		Album
Year	Single	US Country	CAN Country	Album
1990	"San Antone"	—	—	Non-album single
1991	"Good Goodbye"	—	77	What a Woman Wants to Hear
1992	"Tell Me I'm Crazy"	—	—	What a Woman Wants to Hear
1994	"Runaway Train"	62	71	Nothin' but Good
1994	"Nothin' but Good"	—	—	Nothin' but Good
"—" denotes releases that did not chart

=== Music videos ===
Year	Video	Director
1990	"San Antone"	
1991	"Good Goodbye"	Jim May
1994	"Runaway Train"	Steven Goldmann
1994	"Nothin' but Good"	Michael Salomon
