= Ricochet (Ricochet album) =

Studio album by Ricochet
- Released: February 6, 1996
- Genre: Country
- Length: 33:28
- Label: Columbia
- Producers: Ron Chancey; Ed Seay

Ricochet chronology
Ricochet (1996)	Blink of an Eye (1997)

Singles from Ricochet
- 1. "What Do I Know" Released: December 4, 1995; 2. "Daddy's Money" Released: April 22, 1996; 3. "Love Is Stronger Than Pride" Released: August 5, 1996; 4. "Ease My Troubled Mind" Released: February 25, 1997

Professional ratings
Review scores
Source	Rating
Allmusic -	4/5 stars

Ricochet is the debut studio album by the American country music band Ricochet. Released in 1996 on Columbia Records Nashville, it produced four hit singles on the Billboard Hot Country Singles & Tracks (now Hot Country Songs) charts: "What Do I Know", "Daddy's Money" (a Number One), "Love Is Stronger Than Pride", and "Ease My Troubled Mind". The album itself has been certified gold by the RIAA.

One of the singles were previously recorded by another artist: "Ease My Troubled Mind" by Billy & Terry Smith as a single in 1991.

== Track listing ==
No.	Title	Writer(s)	Length
1.	"Daddy's Money"	Bob DiPiero; Mark D. Sanders; Steve Seskin	3:03
2.	"What Do I Know"	Stephony Smith; Sunny Russ; Cathy Majeski	3:34
3.	"I Can't Dance"	Jim Robinson; Andy Byrd	3:14
4.	"Love Is Stronger Than Pride"	Rick Bowles; Doug Johnson	3:12
5.	"Ease My Troubled Mind"	Tom Shapiro; Chris Waters; Michael Garvin	3:36
6.	"A Little Bit of Love (Is a Dangerous Thing)"	Robinson; Byrd; Stan Meissner	3:25
7.	"From Good to Bad to Worse to Gone"	Billy Yates; Chris Cummings; Frank Dycus	2:39
8.	"The Truth Is, I Lied"	Bill Anderson; Skip Ewing	3:38
9.	"I Wasn't Ready for You"	Craig Wiseman; Ronnie Samoset	3:23
10.	"Rowdy"	Jeff Stevens; Michael Clark	3:44
Total length:			33:28

== Personnel ==
=== Ricochet ===
- Jeff Bryant – drums, background vocals
- Junior Bryant – fiddle, mandolin, background vocals
- Greg Cook – bass guitar, background vocals
- Teddy Carr – steel guitar, Dobro, background vocals
- Eddie Kilgallon – keyboards, acoustic guitar, saxophone, background vocals
- Heath Wright – lead vocals, electric guitar, fiddle

=== Additional musicians ===
- Bruce Bouton – steel guitar
- Mike Brignardello – bass guitar
- Joe Chemay – bass guitar
- Larry Franklin – fiddle
- John Hobbs – piano
- Brent Rowan – electric guitar
- Biff Watson – acoustic guitar
- Lonnie Wilson – drums

== Charts ==
=== Weekly charts ===
Chart (1996)	Peak position
Canadian Country Albums (RPM)	12
US Billboard 200	101
US Top Country Albums (Billboard)	14
US Top Heatseekers Albums (Billboard)	1

=== Year-end charts ===
Chart (1996)	Position
US Top Country Albums (Billboard)	49
