= Does He Love You =

1993 single by Reba McEntire and Linda Davis

Single by Reba McEntire with Linda Davis

from the album Greatest Hits Volume Two
- B-side: "Straight From You"
- Released: August 9, 1993
- Genre: Country
- Length: 4:19
- Label: MCA Nashville
- Songwriters: Sandy Knox; Billy Stritch
- Producers: Tony Brown; Reba McEntire

Reba McEntire singles chronology
"It's Your Call" (1993)	"Does He Love You" (1993)	"They Asked About You" (1993)

Linda Davis singles chronology
"He Isn't My Affair Anymore" (1992)	"Does He Love You" (1993)	"Love Didn't Do It" (1994)

Music video
- "Does He Love You (Official Music Video)" on YouTube

"Does He Love You" is a song written by Sandy Knox and Billy Stritch, and recorded as a duet by American country music artists Reba McEntire and Linda Davis. It was released in August 1993, by MCA Nashville, as the first single from McEntire's second compilation album, Greatest Hits Volume 2 (1993). It is one of country music's several songs about a love triangle. The accompanying music video was directed by Jon Small.

In 2021, a duet version with singer Dolly Parton was released.

== History ==
"Does He Love You" was written in 1982 by Billy Stritch and Sandy Knox. He recorded it with a trio in which he performed at the time, because he wanted a song that could be sung by the other two members of the trio, both of whom were women. It had been pitched to Barbara Mandrell and Liza Minnelli, but McEntire ended up recording it. She had wanted to include Linda Davis, then a vocalist in her road band, as a duet partner. McEntire's then-husband and manager, Narvel Blackstock, told her that MCA Records "would rather [she] record this with somebody more established", such as Wynonna Judd or Trisha Yearwood, both of whom were on the same label at the time. McEntire called Tony Brown, then working as a record producer for both her and Judd. Brown told her that Judd might record the song if McEntire asked her personally, but added that Judd did not want to record songs about "marital problems". McEntire submitted a demo to Judd and, after not hearing back from her, recorded the song with Davis in June 1993.

The single went on to win the Grammy award for Best Country Vocal Collaboration, a Country Music Association Award for Vocal Event of the Year, and a TNN/Music City News award for Best Vocal Collaboration.

In 1996, Minnelli released the song as a duet with Donna Summer, from Minnelli's album, "Gently". In 1997, it appeared on Patti LaBelle's album, Flame. Larry Flick from Billboard magazine wrote, "LaBelle effectively reinvents the Reba McEntire and Linda Davis hit as a R&B ballad."

The track was the most recent number one female duet on a Billboard country music chart based on airplay for over 28 years until "Drunk (And I Don't Wanna Go Home)" by Elle King and Miranda Lambert topped the chart in April 2022.

It was Davis's only number one on the country charts.

== Content ==
The song features a vocal battle between two female narrators, the wife and the mistress of the same man. Both women know that the man is being unfaithful to them and are wondering who he truly loves.

== Music video ==
The big-budget, Jon Small-directed music video for "Does He Love You" was filmed over 3 days in mid-1993. It begins with Reba in her dressing room wearing a lilac feather gown, where she sees a picture of her lover, which she glances at. It then shows Linda as a professional actress at a movie premiere, then cuts back to Reba smashing the picture with a metal object. Reba shows up in a limo with the same man. The two women are seen then in a photo shoot holding an award and the man in the background.

The next scene shows Linda and the man flirting in a hotel bar. Reba appears wearing a white suit, standing behind a glass and wood wall, as if not to be noticed by Linda. She sees what is really going on, and Linda notices her, only to come over to her and begin singing the second chorus.

It then briefly goes back to the dressing room, where Reba continues to smash her lover's picture. The next scene shows Reba approaching Linda's house in the pouring rain at night, while Linda stands on her porch as they sing the bridge.

The scene then shifts to the next day, where Reba watches from afar as Linda and the man are seen on a speedboat, where he hugs her, implying that Linda is who he truly loves. Reba finally smiles as the boat leaves the dock and then explodes.

After the song is complete, the director (portrayed by Rob Reiner) yells "Cut!" and shows Reba and the crew the footage as Reiner was directing the 1994 movie North of which McEntire starred in which was filming around the same time as the music video.

Prior to shooting for the video, McEntire had a basal-cell carcinoma on her forehead removed and so the costume designer, Sandi Spika, had McEntire's hair placed over the spot to cover up the bandage, as well as using scarves as part of the outfits.

== Track list ==
United Kingdom Maxi single CD1

1. "Does He Love You" (Album Version)
2. "Does He Love You" (Live)
3. "I'll Be" (Live)

United Kingdom Maxi single CD2

1. "Does He Love You" (Album Version)
2. "The Greatest Man I Never Knew" (Live)
3. "What If"

== Chart performance ==
Chart (1993)	Peak position
Canada Country Singles (RPM)	1
US Hot Country Songs (Billboard)	1
Chart (1999)	Peak position
UK Singles Chart	62
Sweden Singles Chart	72

=== Year-end charts ===
Chart (1993)	Position
Canada Country Tracks (RPM)	52
US Country Songs (Billboard)	40

== Certifications ==
Region	Certification	Certified units/sales
United States (RIAA)	Gold	500,000^{‡}
^{‡} Sales+streaming figures based on certification alone.

== Duet version with Dolly Parton ==
"Does He Love You (Revisited)"

Single by Reba McEntire featuring Dolly Parton

from the album Revived Remixed Revisited
- Released: October 8, 2021
- Recorded: 2021
- Length: 4:25
- Label: MCA Nashville; Universal
- Songwriters: Sandy Knox; Billy Stritch
- Producers: Dave Cobb; Reba McEntire

Reba McEntire singles chronology
"Freedom" (2019)	"Does He Love You (Revisited)" (2021)	"I Can't" (2024)

Dolly Parton singles chronology
"In the Sweet By-and-By" (2021)	"Does He Love You (Revisited)" (2021)

Music video
- "Does He Love You (Revisited)" on YouTube

On October 8, 2021, "Does He Love You (Revisited)" was sent to country radio as the lead single from McEntire's thirty-fourth studio album and first remix album, Revived Remixed Revisited. A duet with American singer Dolly Parton, the track was produced by Dave Cobb and McEntire. While MCA Nashville explained the song was not an official single, the revisited version has received heavy promotion from the label and McEntire doing key interviews.

"Does He Love You (Revisited)" debuted at number 49 on the US Billboard Country Airplay Chart.

=== Music video ===
A music video premiered on YouTube on October 9, 2021.

=== Charts ===
Chart (2021)	Peak position
US Hot Country Songs (Billboard)	47
US Country Airplay (Billboard)	49

=== Credits and personnel ===
Credits adapted from Tidal.

==== Musicians ====
- Reba McEntire – vocals, production
- Dolly Parton – featured artist
- Dave Cobb – production, acoustic guitar, percussion
- Billy Stritch – composer, lyricist
- Sandy Knox – composer, lyricist
- Leroy Powell – acoustic guitar
- Brian Allen – bass
- Chris Powell – drums, percussion
- Phillip Towns – hammond B3
- Paul Franklin – pedal Steel
- Phillip Towns – piano

==== Technical ====
- Brandon Bell – engineer
- Lars Fox – engineer
- Pete Lyman – mastering engineer
- Darrell Thorp – mixer, recording engineer
- Andrew Brightman – production coordinator
- Phillip Smith – assistant recording engineer
- Olivia Painter – assistant recording engineer
- Daniel Bacigalupi – assistant mastering engineer

=== Release history ===
Region	Date	Format	Label	Ref.
United States	October 8, 2021	Radio airplay	MCA Nashville; Universal	
Various	October 8, 2021	Digital download; streaming	MCA Nashville; Universal	
