= Ricochet (band) =

American country music band

- Origin: Tulsa, Oklahoma, U.S.
- Genre: Country
- Years active: 1993–present
- Labels: Columbia, Cowtown, Mi
- Members: Heath Wright— Lead Vocals, Lead Guitar & Fiddle Larry Hight—Steel Guitar, Electric and Acoustic Guitar, Dobro, Saxophone & Vocals Bruce Bennett—Bass Guitar & Vocals Matt Harelik—Keyboards, Trumpet & Vocals Zack Benbrook—Drums & Vocals
- Past members: Chris Hempfling; Greg Cook; Jeff Bryant; Junior Bryant; Teddy Carr; Tim Chewning; Shannon Farmer; Jimmy Herman; Eddie Kilgallon; Kenny Lewis; Keith Mellington; Marty Mitchell; Barry Pardue; Troy Nelson; Dwayne Dupuy; Robert Wright; Justin Spears; Nick Tate; Shane Mullins; Matt Harelik; David Alexander; Rick Toops
- Website: http://www.ricochetonline.com

Ricochet is an American country music band from Tulsa, Oklahoma. The band was founded in 1993 by brothers Jeff Bryant (drums, vocals) and Junior Bryant (fiddle, mandolin, vocals), along with Heath Wright (lead vocals, lead guitar, fiddle), Greg Cook (bass guitar, vocals), Teddy Carr (steel guitar, Dobro), and Eddie Kilgallon (keyboards, rhythm guitar, saxophone, vocals). Ricochet got their start playing at The Silver Bullet in Columbia, Missouri, as a cover band, playing songs by such artists as George Strait, Tracy Lawrence, Vince Gill, and Diamond Rio

After several years of playing throughout the Southern United States, Ricochet was signed to a recording contract with Columbia Records in 1995. Their self-titled debut album produced three straight Top Ten hits on the Billboard Hot Country Singles & Tracks (now Hot Country Songs) charts, including the number-one single "Daddy's Money"; the album was also certified gold in the United States.

The band followed its debut album with 1997's Blink of an Eye, which also produced several hits on the country music charts. A third album, titled What a Ride, was slated for release in 1997, but was not released; however, their 2000 album What You Leave Behind contained tracks from this cancelled album. After being dropped from Columbia in 2001, Ricochet released a live album on an independent label. Ricochet's latest album 15 years and Counting has produced the crowd favorite "Sweet Tea".

Ricochet's membership has changed significantly over time. Of the original six members, only Heath Wright remains, alongside Zack Benbrook (vocals, drums), Matt Harelik—Keyboards, Trumpet & Vocals , Bruce Bennett (vocals, bass) and Larry Hight (vocals, rhythm/lead guitar, steel, dobro and saxophone).

== Beginnings ==
Ricochet was founded in 1993 by brothers Jeff (born December 27, 1962) and Junior Bryant (born October 23, 1968), who at the time were members of a band called Lariat, in which Jeff played drums, and Junior played fiddle and mandolin. The two brothers had invited lead singer Heath Wright (born April 22, 1967) to join Lariat; although the other members of Lariat disbanded not long afterward, the Bryant brothers and Wright decided to form a new group known as Ricochet.

The three members held auditions to recruit additional members, finalizing in 1994 with a six-piece lineup composed of Jeff, Junior, and Heath, as well as Teddy Carr (steel guitar, tenor vocals) (born July 4, 1960), Greg Cook (bass guitar, bass vocals) (born January 28, 1965), and Eddie Kilgallon (keyboards, rhythm guitar, saxophone, baritone vocals) (born May 12, 1965). Under this lineup, Ricochet toured throughout the Southern United States, where they soon became known for their high-energy, mainstream country music sound. They often spent their downtime rehearsing and writing songs.

== 1995-1997: Major-label debut ==
Through the help of the band's manager, Ricochet was recommended to Blake Chancey, an A&R director for the Columbia Records label and they were signed to a development deal. By early 1995, the deal turned into a full-fledged recording contract with the label; in addition, they were signed as an opening act for Doug Stone, Charlie Daniels and Merle Haggard.

Ricochet's self-titled debut album, Ricochet, was released in 1996. The song "What Do I Know" served as its lead-off single, and was a Top 10 hit on the Billboard country music charts. It was followed by "Daddy's Money" (their only Number One hit to date) and "Love Is Stronger Than Pride", also a Top 10. The album remained on the Top Country Albums charts for more than a year, and was certified gold in the United States. Ricochet's rendition of "The Star-Spangled Banner", recorded for Columbia's NASCAR: Hotter Than Asphalt album, charted at number 58.

== 1997-1999: Blink of an Eye and What a Ride ==
Ricochet's second album, Blink of an Eye, was released in 1997. Although its lead-off single, "He Left a Lot to Be Desired", was a Top 20 hit, the album did not perform as well as its predecessor. A third album for Columbia, tentatively titled What a Ride, was recorded in 1998; although three of its singles entered the country charts, the album was not released.

== 2000-present ==
A bout of carpal tunnel syndrome forced Jeff Bryant to leave the group in 1999; he was subsequently replaced by Tim Chewning on drums. Around the same time, Shannon Farmer replaced steel guitarist Teddy Carr, after Carr and his wife were preparing for their first child. With the new members in place, Ricochet recorded the album What You Leave Behind in 2000; included on it were several tracks from the unreleased What a Ride, most notably their cover of Steve Young's "Seven Bridges Road". Two of the songs that were newly recorded for What You Leave Behind were also released as singles before the band exited Columbia's roster in 2000. In 2001, Eddie Kilgallion left the band to tour with Montgomery Gentry. The following year, Junior Bryant departed to spend time with his wife and children. A live album, titled The Live Album, was issued in 2004 on the independent Cowtown Records label. In September 2008, the band released a compilation album entitled Ricochet Reloaded--Hits/Plus, which includes a combination of their greatest hits and newly recorded material. The latest release in 2012 entitled 15 Years and Counting is a compilation of Hits, fan favorites, and newly recorded material. In 2014, bassist Greg Cook left the band to become the Tour Manager for Ricochet's close friends, The Swon Brothers, after the Swon's successful season on the hit show, The Voice.

Jeff and Junior Bryant's nephew, Chase Bryant, is also a singer.

== Discography ==
=== Albums ===
Title	Album details	Peak chart positions				Certifications (sales thresholds)
Title	Album details	US Country	US Heat	US	CAN Country	Certifications (sales thresholds)
Ricochet	Release date: February 6, 1996; Label: Columbia Records	14	1	101	12	US: Gold
Blink of an Eye	Release date: June 16, 1997; Label: Columbia Records	24	9	—	—	
What You Leave Behind	Release date: September 12, 2000; Label: Columbia Records	71	—	—	—	
The Live Album	Release date: May 11, 2004; Label: Cowtown Records	—	—	—	—	
Ricochet Reloaded — Hits/Plus	Release date: September 7, 2008; Label: Mi Records	—	—	—	—	
Ricochet 15 Years of Hits and Counting	Release date: June 7, 2012; Label: Mi Records	—	—	—	—	
"—" denotes releases that did not chart

=== Singles ===
Year	Single	Peak chart positions		Album
Year	Single	US Country	CAN Country	Album
1995	"What Do I Know"	5	21	Ricochet
1996	"Daddy's Money"	1	3	Ricochet
1996	"Love Is Stronger Than Pride"	9	10	Ricochet
1997	"Ease My Troubled Mind"	20	22	Ricochet
1997	"He Left a Lot to Be Desired"	18	14	Blink of an Eye
1997	"Blink of an Eye"	39	39	Blink of an Eye
1998	"Connected at the Heart"	44	70	Blink of an Eye
1998	"Honky Tonk Baby"	58	61	What a Ride (unreleased)
1998	"Can't Stop Thinkin' 'Bout That"	52	54	What a Ride (unreleased)
1999	"Seven Bridges Road"	48	54	What a Ride (unreleased)
2000	"Do I Love You Enough"	45	71	What You Leave Behind
2000	"She's Gone"	48	—	What You Leave Behind
2001	"Freedom Isn't Free"	—	—	—N/a
2008	"I Had to Be Me"	—	—	Ricochet Reloaded — Hits/Plus
2009	"Feel Like Fallin'"	—	—	Ricochet Reloaded — Hits/Plus
"—" denotes releases that did not chart

=== Other charted songs ===
Year	Single	Peak positions	Album
Year	Single	US Country	Album
1996	"The Star-Spangled Banner"	58	NASCAR: Hotter Than Asphalt
1996	"Let It Snow! Let It Snow! Let It Snow!"	43	—N/a
1997	"Let It Snow! Let It Snow! Let It Snow!"	44	—N/a
1998	"Let It Snow! Let It Snow! Let It Snow!"	47	—N/a
1999	"Let It Snow! Let It Snow! Let It Snow!"	39	—N/a

=== Music videos ===
Year	Video	Director
1996	"Daddy's Money"	Marc Ball
1996	"Love Is Stronger Than Pride"	Marc Ball
1996	"Let It Snow, Let It Snow, Let It Snow"	
1997	"Ease My Troubled Mind"	Marc Ball
1997	"He Left a Lot to Be Desired"	Marc Ball
1997	"Blink of an Eye"	Steven Goldmann
1999	"Seven Bridges Road"	Jim Shea
2000	"She's Gone"	David McClister
2004	"Feel Like Fallin'"	

== Awards and nominations ==
Year	Organization	Award	Nominee/Work	Result
1996	Billboard Music Awards	Top Country Song	"Daddy's Money"	Nominated
1997	Academy of Country Music Awards	Top New Vocal Group or Duet	Ricochet	Won
1997	Academy of Country Music Awards	Top Vocal Group of the Year	Ricochet	Nominated
1997	Country Music Association Awards	Vocal Group of the Year	Ricochet	Nominated
