= A Special Evening with Carol Burnett =

- The Carol Burnett Show episode
- Episode no.: Season 11; Episode 24
- Directed by: Dave Powers
- Written by: Roger Beatty; Rick Hawkins; Liz Sage; Robert Illes; James Stein; Franelle Silver; Larry Siegel; Tim Conway; Bill Richmond; Gene Perret; Dick Clair; Jenna McMahon; Ed Simmons; Buz Kohan; Bill Angelos; Gail Parent; Tom Patchett; Jay Tarses; Stan Burns; Mike Marmer; Artie Julian; Gary Belkin; Arnie Rosen; Ken Welch; Mitzie Welch
- Production code: 0124
- Original air date: March 29, 1978

Guest appearances
- James Stewart; Craig Richard Nelson as the Psychiatrist; Harvey Korman

Episode chronology
← Previous "Episode #0123"	Next → —

"A Special Evening with Carol Burnett" is the two-hour series finale of the American variety/sketch comedy television show The Carol Burnett Show. It is the 279th overall episode of the show and the 24th episode of the eleventh and final season which aired on CBS on Wednesday, March 29, 1978 from 8:00 to 10:00 p.m. EST.

The episode, directed by Dave Powers and written by a large number of collaborators, was videotaped in front of a live audience on March 17, 1978 at CBS Television City's Studio 33 in Hollywood, California.

== Summary ==
Carol Burnett, Tim Conway and Vicki Lawrence reminisce about past shows and introduce excerpts spanning eleven seasons of The Carol Burnett Show which include the following highlights: Burnett does her Tarzan yell and performs in duets with such guests as Liza Minnelli, Ella Fitzgerald, Perry Como, Ray Charles, Bing Crosby, Rock Hudson, Steve Lawrence and Eydie Gormé; in comic skits, Burt Reynolds sings "As Time Goes By"; Harvey Korman sings "They Call the Wind Maria"; and Burnett sings "Come Rain or Come Shine," "The Lady Is a Tramp," and "You Light Up My Life"; movie parodies include The African Queen and The Postman Always Rings Twice.

Additional highlights include Lawrence singing "The Night the Lights Went Out in Georgia" and "S-P-L-I-T", a spoof of a country-and-western song; Bing Crosby and Bob Hope appear in a restaurant skit; Conway performs the role of a sports commentator in his very first sketch on the series; a Columbo parody titled "Cobumble" is featured and Dick Van Dyke appears with Burnett in the comic sketch "Hand Insurance"; a series of bloopers and outtakes are included from previous shows featuring the regular cast.

Also featured are new sketches of "Mrs. Wiggins" and "The Family". In "Mrs. Wiggins" sketch titled Flashbacks, Mr. Tudball (Conway) is moving his office to a new location and has a flashback to the first time he interviewed Mrs. Wiggins (Burnett); and in "The Family" sketch The Psychiatrist, Eunice (Burnett) and Mama (Lawrence) visit a psychiatrist (Craig Richard Nelson) as Eunice is trying to figure out what went wrong with her life. (Although these were the final sketches of The Carol Burnett Show, the characters would end up being reprised one year later in a different four-week series, Carol Burnett & Company).

As a special surprise for Burnett, Conway introduces a piano player and – when the curtain goes up – it is legendary screen actor James Stewart playing the piano and singing "Ragtime Cowboy Joe". Burnett, a lifelong fan of Stewart's, breaks down in tears and expresses how much she admires and loves him, and Stewart reciprocates by saying: "Carol, I just feel so wonderful to be here, to be a part of all these millions of people to thank you for all the wonderful beautiful times you've given all of us, all of these eleven years. And I'm frankly speaking for all the millions of people".

In the final moments of the show, Burnett, as the Charwoman, is backstage and waves goodbye to the show's staff and celebrities from the audience as they silently walk by to wish her farewell. Harvey Korman, who was appearing as a guest, stops and gives her a kiss; Lawrence comes out of a stage door, signs Burnett's autograph book, kisses and hugs her and leaves; Conway comes down the stairs and does the same.

She then walks across the empty stage towards a sign reading THE CAROL BURNETT SHOW and flips it over to read CLOSED. Sitting on her Charwoman's bucket, Burnett talks about how hard it is to leave and why she decided to end the show despite a season 12 renewal. She says it felt like the time to move on to do other things while the show was still doing well. She talks about the crew and each member of her cast and how much she loves and respects them. Finally, she thanks the audience and tearfully sings a soulful rendition of the show's closing theme-song "I'm So Glad We Had This Time Together". She blows a kiss to the audience, tugs at her ear one last time and says goodnight.

== Production notes ==
Although CBS wanted to renew the show for another year, by this time, Burnett had grown tired of the weekly grind and wanted to explore acting roles outside of the comedy genre. With the changes in cast (Harvey Korman left the series after the 1976–77 season and was briefly replaced by Dick Van Dyke) along with the mediocre ratings (finishing its last season in 66th place), she felt that television was undergoing a transition and that the variety series format was on its way out. Therefore, Burnett decided to end the series on her own rather than be canceled later.

The celebrities in the audience for the final episode included Lillian Gish, Bernadette Peters, Betty White and husband Allen Ludden, Roddy McDowall and Jim Nabors.

The Carol Burnett Show was one of the longest-running variety shows in television history; its conclusion marked the closing of another chapter in television as Burnett was the last of the great comedic talents heading a variety show, and hers was the last offering live entertainment before an audience.

== Featured segments ==
- Introduction: Q&A (Carol Burnett)
- Duets: Liza Minnelli, Ella Fitzgerald, Perry Como, Ray Charles, Bing Crosby, Rock Hudson, Steve Lawrence and Eydie Gormé
- "As Time Goes By" (Burt Reynolds)
- "Mrs. Wiggins" – Flashbacks (Carol Burnett, Tim Conway and Vicki Lawrence)
- "Ragtime Cowboy Joe" (James Stewart)
- Water Gimmicks: "They Call the Wind Maria" (Harvey Korman) / "Come Rain or Come Shine" (Carol Burnett)
- Solo Montage: "The Lady Is a Tramp" (Carol Burnett) / "You Light Up My Life" (Carol Burnett)
- Movie Parodies: The African Queen (Carol Burnett and Steve Lawrence) / The Murderer Always Rings Twice (Carol Burnett, Harvey Korman and Steve Lawrence)
- "The Doily Sisters" (Carol Burnett and Vicki Lawrence)
- Favorite Moments: "The Night the Lights Went Out in Georgia" (Vicki Lawrence) / "S-P-L-I-T" (Vicki Lawrence) / "The Brown Derby" (Carol Burnett, Bing Crosby and Bob Hope) / "Newscasters" (Tim Conway) / "Cobumble" (Tim Conway) / "Hand Insurance" (Carol Burnett and Dick Van Dyke)
- "The Family" – The Psychiatrist (Carol Burnett, Vicki Lawrence and Craig Richard Nelson)
- Scrapbook: "Magic Bird of Fire" (The Ernie Flatt Dancers)
- Bloopers and Outtakes
- Finale: The Charwoman / "I'm So Glad We Had This Time Together" (Carol Burnett)

== DVD release ==
On October 3, 2017, Time Life released The Best of The Carol Burnett Show – The Final Show as a single disc DVD in Region 1 to commemorate the show's 50th anniversary.
