= Eunice Harper Higgins =

Carol Burnett comedic role

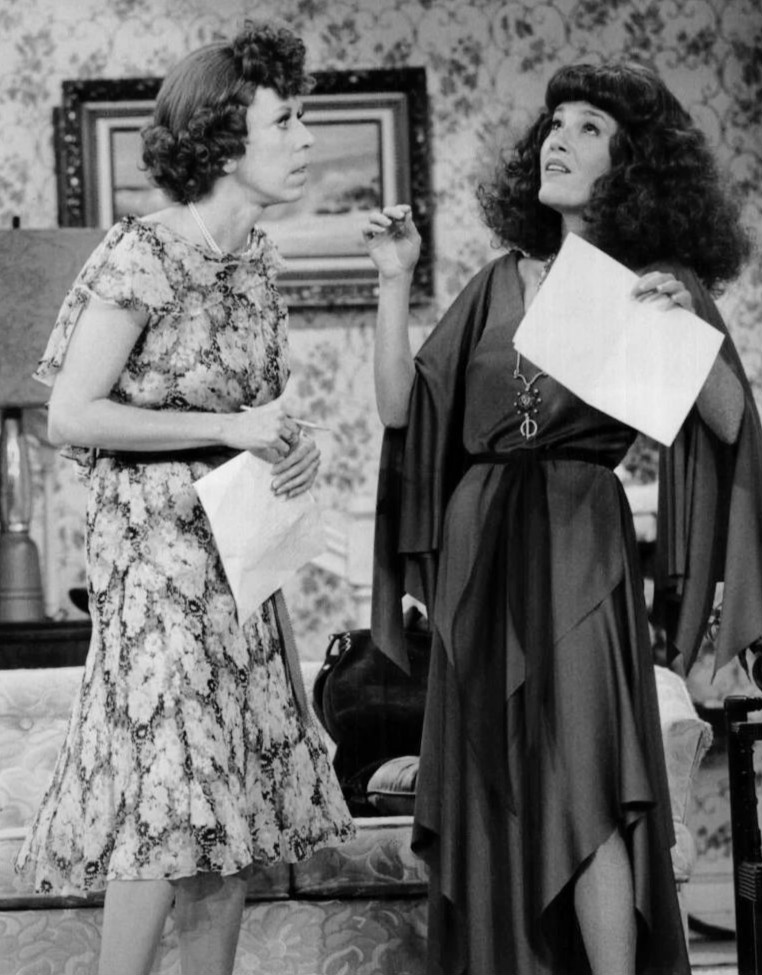
- Carol Burnett (left) as Eunice Higgins
- First appearance: Family sketch episode "Phillip's Visit"
- Last appearance: Mama's Family episode "Rashomama" (last seen played by Carol Burnett); Mama's Family episode "Sins of the Mother" (last seen in general); Mama's Family episode "Pomp and Circumstance" (last heard, portrayed in voice only)
- Created by: Dick Clair
- Portrayed by: Carol Burnett; Tanya Fenmore as a child version of Eunice (Mama's Family episode "Mama's Birthday"); Heather Kerr as a teenage version of Eunice (Mama's Family episode "Sins of the Mother"); Phyllis Franklin in a voice-only portrayal (Mama's Family episode "Pomp and Circumstance")

In-universe information
- Nickname: Eunie (by Ed)
- Title: Mrs. Higgins
- Occupation: Homemaker; Mother
- Family: Carl Harper (father; deceased); Thelma Harper (mother); Ellen Jackson (sister); Vinton Harper (brother); Larry Harper (brother)
- Spouse: Ed Higgins
- Children: Bubba Higgins (son); Billy Joe Higgins (son; only mentioned in "The Family" sketches)
- Relatives: Fran Crowley (aunt; deceased); Buzz Harper (nephew); Sonja Harper (niece); Tiffany Thelma Harper (niece); Mary Beth Jackson (niece)

Eunice Higgins (née Harper) is the main character in "The Family" comedy sketches played by Carol Burnett and featured on The Carol Burnett Show (1974–78) and Carol Burnett & Company (1979). Eunice also was featured in her eponymous CBS TV movie, which aired in 1982. The film starred Carol Burnett as Eunice; Ken Berry as Eunice's well-to-do brother, Philip (Berry played a different brother, Vinton, on the spin-off TV series); Harvey Korman as Eunice's husband, Ed Higgins; Betty White as Eunice's sister, Ellen Harper-Jackson; Vicki Lawrence as Eunice's "Mama", Thelma Harper; and Dick Clair as the voice of Eunice's father Carl Harper. The film takes the Harper family on a 23-year journey.

Eunice appeared occasionally on "The Family" skit's spin-off sitcom Mama's Family. As portrayed by Carol Burnett, Eunice was in six episodes of Mama's Family, all of which were in the first life of Mama's Family on NBC. Five of Burnett's six appearances were in season 1. The sixth episode of season 2 ("Rashomama"), which aired on November 3, 1983, was Burnett's final portrayal of Eunice. The character made two subsequent appearances in flashback episodes. Tanya Fenmore played Eunice as a child in the nineteenth episode of season 2 ("Mama's Birthday). This marked the character's final appearance in the first life of the sitcom.

Eunice appeared only once during the second life of Mama's Family (originally in first-run syndication). The character's final appearance was in the fourteenth episode of season 4 ("The Sins of the Mother"), portrayed as a teenager by Heather Kerr. Eunice is presented once more in voice only in the final episode of season 4 ("Pomp and Circumstance"); Eunice, voiced by Phyllis Franklin, spoke to Mama over the phone to inform her that she couldn't attend her son Bubba's high school graduation. She declined to explain her reasons to Bubba, hanging up when Mama threatened to put him on the phone.

Always clad in a fluttery green dress and wearing her hair in a 1940s-era perm, Eunice is a working-class homemaker married to Ed Higgins. Eunice had a stormy, irrepressible, browbeating persona, always going melodramatically out of control, ranting and raving. However, especially on "The Family" sketches, Eunice was beaten down by her tyrannical, emotionally-abusive mother, and her fits of rage were usually provoked by her mother's passive-aggressive comments. Her character was portrayed as a jealous antagonist in her appearances on Mama's Family, much more so than her appearances on "The Family" sketches. Carol Burnett has said that Eunice is her favorite character from her show. Burnett did not appear at all in the first-run syndication version of the show due to her acrimonious 1984 divorce from Carol Burnett Show and Mama's Family producer, Joe Hamilton, who owned all the Mama's Family characters. Also, as revealed in Vicki Lawrence's autobiography, Burnett resented Lawrence for accepting the "Mama" role in first-run syndication, this being during her divorce from Hamilton. She held a grudge against Lawrence until Hamilton's death in 1991. According to the original Carol Burnett Show, Eunice had three brothers: Phillip (Roddy McDowall); Larry (Alan Alda); Jack (Tom Smothers); and one sister, Ellen (Betty White). Later, Mama's Family added a fourth brother, Vinton, played by Ken Berry. Their Aunt Fran was played by Rue McClanahan.

== Creation and development ==
Writers Dick Clair and Jenna McMahon created the Eunice character as part of a sketch the two would perform on TV variety shows in the 1960s. McMahon played Eunice and Clair played her brother. They later adapted the sketch for The Carol Burnett Show in 1973, and added the mother character (initially thinking Burnett would play the mother). In contrast to being Midwestern as Clair and McMahon had created, Burnett based the characterization on her own mother, who also had a Texas accent.

Burnett said Bob Mackie's costumes helped her with her feel for the character.

== Family/Early life ==
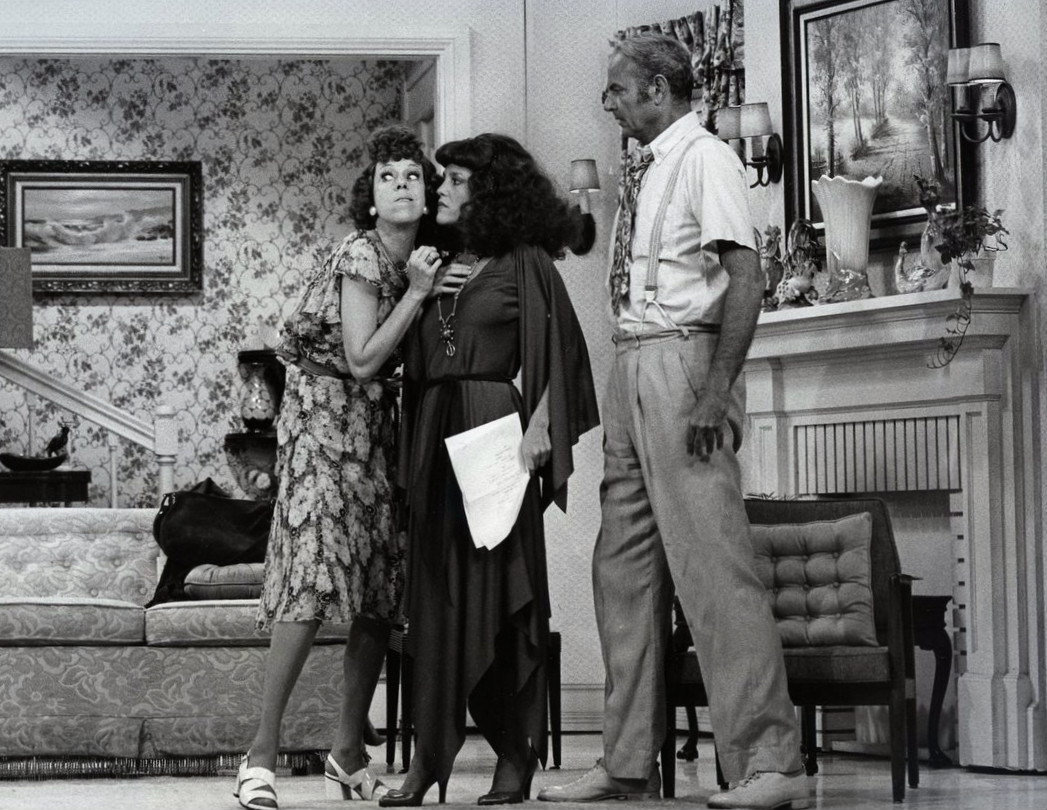
Eunice, her husband Ed (Harvey Korman), and an acting teacher (Madeline Kahn)

Eunice and her family are from Raytown, Missouri. Eunice's birthday is December 19 which makes her a Sagittarius. Her mother is Thelma Harper, whom she sometimes refers to as "Old Lady." Eunice eloped with a hardware store owner named Ed Higgins after he impregnated her. Eunice and Ed had two sons, Bubba (who later moved in with Thelma during the run of Mama's Family) and Billy Joe. Her older sister is Ellen Harper and she has at least one brother, depending on the installment (Vinton Harper in Mama's Family; Larry, Phillip, and Jack in the original sketches.)

Eunice had a strained relationship with her parents growing up, as they blatantly favored her sister Ellen. She was bitter towards her father, who called her his "Prune Tart", while calling Ellen "Apple Dumpling".

== Relationships ==
Even in adulthood, Eunice's mother blatantly favors her rich sister Ellen, though Eunice visits her mother much more often and takes care of her more. This leads to a bitter, cold dynamic between the two sisters, Eunice regarding Ellen as a selfish snob, and Ellen seeing Eunice as obnoxious, embarrassing and crazy.

Eunice and her mother, Thelma Harper have a very dysfunctional relationship. Eunice often tries to please her mother, but she is never satisfied, and nags Eunice to the point where she becomes irate and so agitated she goes into screaming fits. Mama often also puts guilt on Eunice, putting her more on edge. This guilt leads to Eunice's snapping back at her mother, calling her "old lady", and ranting hysterically.

Eunice is unhappy with her marriage. She views her husband, Ed, as a dolt and has called him a dumb cluck or a goon numerous times. He eventually leaves her.

Eunice is generally very unhappy and bitter, distraught and broken down by her mother, and very emotionally unstable and going on many destructive fits. She eventually visits a psychiatrist, where Eunice reveals she is worried about her fits, and she is not happy with herself. The psychiatrist eventually helps her realize she does not have to let her abusive mother affect her, and he leads her on the road to recovery.
