= Eunice (film) =

1982 film

- Written by: Dick Clair; Jenna McMahon
- Directed by: Roger Beatty; Harvey Korman
- Starring: Carol Burnett; Harvey Korman; Vicki Lawrence; Ken Berry; Betty White
- Music by: Peter Matz
- Country of origin: United States
- Original language: English

Production
- Producer: Joe Hamilton
- Production locations: CBS Television City; Hollywood, California
- Cinematography: Joe Arvizu; Toby Brown; Ed Chaney; Mike Denney
- Editor: Bob Bernstein
- Running time: 90 minutes
- Production company: Joe Hamilton Productions

Original release
- Network: CBS
- Release: March 15, 1982

Related
- Mama's Family; The Carol Burnett Show

Eunice is a 1982 American made-for-television comedy-drama film starring Carol Burnett, Harvey Korman, Vicki Lawrence, Ken Berry and Betty White which is based on characters of a recurring series of comedy sketches called "The Family" featured on The Carol Burnett Show (1974–78) and Carol Burnett & Company (1979). The film was broadcast as a "CBS Special Presentation" on March 15, 1982, and served as a precursor to the spin-off television sitcom Mama's Family. It was directed by Roger Beatty and Harvey Korman.

== Plot ==
Eunice is divided into four acts, spanning 23 years in the life of Eunice Harper Higgins:

1955: A young Eunice Harper is looking forward to going to a party with her date Ed Higgins. Eunice's brother Phillip, a recent college graduate, comes home and announces that he has a chance to go to New York City in hopes of becoming a writer and must leave that day. In the meantime, their mother Thelma Harper is frantic about Phillip going so spontaneously and is trying to get her husband Carl out of the bathroom to stop their son from leaving. Ed and Eunice have a fight on the porch because Ed doesn't want to go to the party. Ed storms off, they break up, and Eunice goes to the party.

1963: Ed and Eunice are married and have two sons, Billy and Bubba. Ed and Eunice come to Thelma's house to see Phillip, who is visiting from New York. Phillip is now a bestselling author of a historical novel. He announces that a movie producer wants to make one of his books into a film. Carl died years earlier and Thelma wants to visit his grave. Eunice, who wants to be an actress, wants to leave with Phillip and be in the film.

1973: Ed and Eunice are divorced and Phillip, who has won the Pulitzer Prize, is visiting again, this time from Los Angeles. Although many of his books were made into movies, he decides this time to write the screenplay for a new film. Eunice still wants a part in Phillip's film. At the same time, Bubba, who has been missing for almost a year, calls, and a frantic Eunice demands to know where he is.

1978: Eunice, Phillip, and their sister Ellen come home from Thelma's funeral. The three siblings are discussing Thelma's death, the funeral, and the future. Ed shows up to give his condolences, and seems to want to reconcile with Eunice, and after she agrees to give it a try, he mentions he had remarried; and it turns out he was really hoping to get Phillip to invest in his new hardware business. After Eunice throws Ed out, she gets into an argument with Ellen, who storms out. Eunice, in a frenzy, finally breaks down yelling out for Thelma. In Thelma's bedroom, Phillip tells Eunice that the only thing stopping her from the life she wants to live is herself. Phillip convinces Eunice to spontaneously come to Los Angeles with him. She decides to leave with Phillip and in her excitement, she calls her Aunt Ina to let her know what her plans are. Aunt Ina wants Eunice to help her with her sore back and it's implied that Eunice will never actually get to live the life she wants.

== Cast ==
- Carol Burnett as Eunice Harper Higgins
- Harvey Korman as Ed Higgins
- Vicki Lawrence as Thelma Harper
- Ken Berry as Phillip
- Betty White as Ellen Harper
- Dick Clair as Carl (voice only)

== Awards and nominations ==
Lawrence was nominated for a Primetime Emmy Award for Outstanding Supporting Actress in a Miniseries or a Movie for her role as Thelma Harper.

== Home media ==
Eunice was released as a bonus feature on Mama's Family: The Complete Second Season DVD set on September 10, 2013.
