= The Family (sketch) =

Sketches featured on The Carol Burnett Show

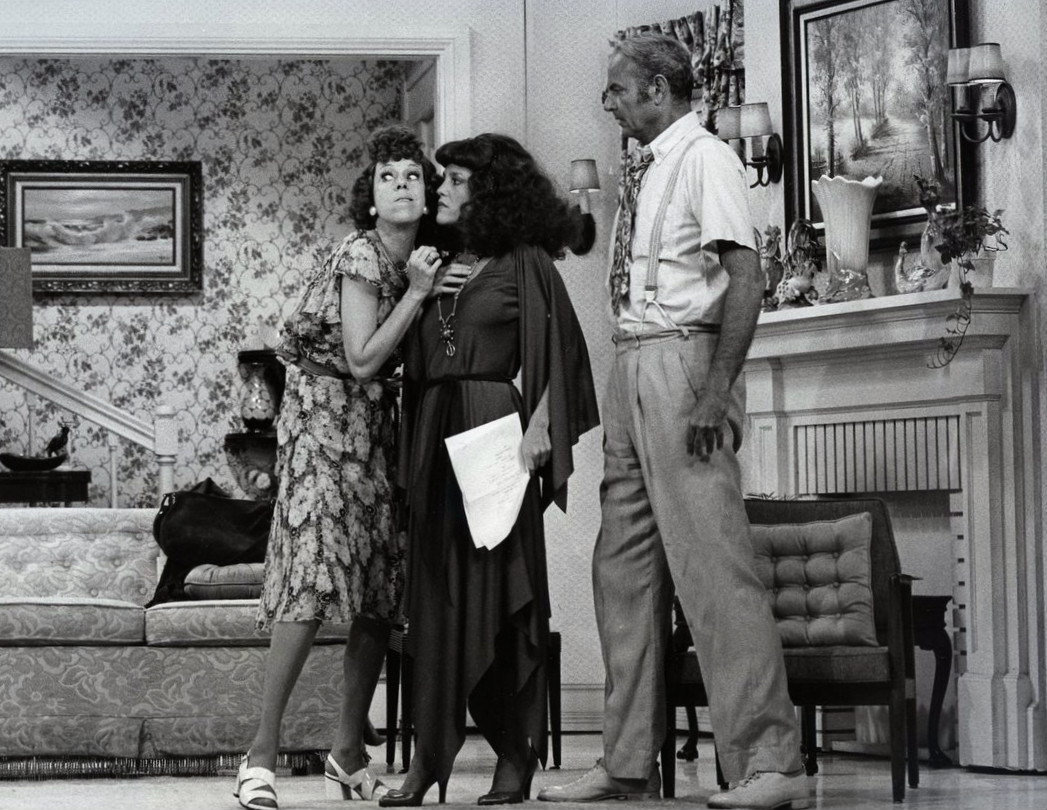
Eunice rehearses a play with drama coach Mavis Danton (Madeline Kahn) in The Rehearsal (1976), with Ed watching.

"The Family" is a series of comedy sketches featured on The Carol Burnett Show, with one final installment airing on Carol Burnett & Company. The Carol Burnett Show introduced the skit starting in the 1973–1974 season. Overall, it aired new installments of the skit for the last five seasons of its total 11-season run; the skit aired from the 1973–1974 season to the 1977–1978 season on the show. The final installment of "The Family" aired on September 8, 1979, after Burnett's CBS show had concluded, on a four-week summer series entitled Carol Burnett & Company. This was the only installment of "The Family" that did not air on The Carol Burnett Show. Altogether, there were 31 appearances of "The Family" sketches.

"The Family"'s success saw it developed into a 1982 TV movie titled Eunice, and then later spun off into a full-fledged sitcom in 1983, Mama's Family. Mama's Family first aired on NBC until it was cancelled in 1984, then revived in 1986 in first-run syndication, lasting until its series finale in 1990. Carol Burnett, whose Eunice Higgins character was central in "The Family" sketches, did not appear in the sitcom's second incarnation, due to her acrimonious 1984 divorce from The Carol Burnett Show and Mama's Family producer Joe Hamilton, who owned all the Mama's Family characters.

Along with Burnett as Eunice Higgins, "The Family" skits also featured Vicki Lawrence as Mama, Thelma Harper, and Harvey Korman as Eunice's husband Ed Higgins. In "The Family" sketches, Mama has five children (in the subsequent series, she has only three): in addition to Ellen Harper (played by Betty White) and Eunice, there were three sons: Larry Harper (Alan Alda), Phillip Harper (Roddy McDowall in The Carol Burnett Show, Ken Berry in the TV movie Eunice), and Jack Harper (Tom Smothers). There was just one son, Vinton Harper (also played by Berry) in the spin-off television series. Tim Conway played recurring character Mickey Hart, Ed's employee.

== Background ==
"The Family" sketch was created and written by Dick Clair and Jenna McMahon. They originally had Burnett in mind to play Mama and have a guest star to play Eunice. However, Burnett decided that she wanted to play Eunice and wanted to give the part of Mama to Lawrence. Burnett also decided that the cast would play the characters in the sketch as Southern, channeling her own Texas background. Clair and McMahon were so displeased with these adjustments that during the first run-through, they threw down their pads and pencils and stormed out of the rehearsal hall. They complained that the sketch was ruined, and that it would offend the South. After airing to an enormously favorable viewer response, however, Clair and McMahon wrote the sketches for the rest of the run of the show.

== Premise ==
Among plot techniques, "The Family" uses: (A) satire and observational comedy, as the sketch subtly pokes fun at real-life occurrences and real-life human behaviors, inflating them and making fun of them; (B) comedy of manners, as the characters satirize the behaviors of blue-collar, working-class southerners and speak in exaggerated southern drawls.

Unlike Mama's Family, the central character of "The Family" sketches is Eunice. "The Family" sketches are about noisy, quarrelsome couple Eunice and Ed and their unwelcome houseguest who only adds to the drama: Eunice's catty elderly mama. There was a great deal more squabbling in "The Family" sketches than on Mama's Family. It was stated many times that Eunice and Ed had two young sons, Bubba Higgins and Billy-Joe Higgins (though in one skit, Eunice calls her children Bubba and Raymond). They are unseen characters in "The Family" sketches; however, the Bubba Higgins character appears as one of the main supporting role in the first-run syndication version of Mama's Family, played by Allan Kayser. Mama, Eunice, and Ed often have uproarious verbal wars over petty issues, such as board games (they played Monopoly, Sorry!, and Password), how much butter has been used for the bread, what exactly happened 30 or 40 years ago, etc. The final "Family" sketch to air on The Carol Burnett Show had Eunice talking to a psychiatrist trying to figure out what went wrong with her life.

== Characters ==
=== Main characters ===
- Eunice Higgins (Carol Burnett) – As the very fiery, stormy, irrepressible, browbeating daughter of Mama and wife of Ed, Eunice is histrionic and full of powerful emotions: cheerful and giddy one minute and uncontrollably upset the next. Eunice seemingly never changes outfits as she's always seen in the same olive green floral print dress. Greatly ambitious, Eunice aspires to achieve fame, power, and a career in entertainment; however, she's portrayed as a woman who can't excel past substandard living due to a selfless nature to see after her elderly mother as well as her low self-esteem (heavily emphasized in the Eunice movie and which comes courtesy of the mother with whom she's stuck to look after). In addition, she feels deprived of even minimal contentment due to what she perceives as an inconsiderate, lowbrow husband who couldn't care less about her happiness.

She wishes for nothing more than to move up the ladder and live out her dreams, but lacks the initiative and get-up-and-go, choosing rather to care for her aging mother. Her siblings, who rarely visit or call Mama, all live successful lives. Eunice is the only offspring willing to care for Mama, but Mama ungratefully treats her the worst. This is often shown in Mama's tendency to praise her other children for their successes, in the same breath belittling Eunice for having no talent, thereby making nothing of herself. This is just one of many reasons why heated altercations break out among the three characters. When Eunice starts ranting, she brings up loads of irrelevant matters over which she holds resentment. Her long-drawn-out rants often relate to issues dating as far back as her childhood. Of the three characters, Eunice exercises the most control in the gang.

- Mama (Vicki Lawrence) – In "The Family" sketches, Mama is a cold, spiteful, cantankerous, elderly widow. Mama has other sides to her in Mama's Family, such as her tendency to make good-natured wisecracks and snappy retorts; however, her commentary in "The Family" sketches is limited to constant captious complaints, belligerent remarks that instigate the other characters, and an easily-annoyed demeanor. She also makes insinuative, disparaging remarks intended to offend and anger her daughter and son-in-law. For example, she constantly lets Ed and Eunice know what's wrong with them and how they've amounted to nothing. She frequently makes veiled remarks to Eunice about how her other children, Philip, Larry and Ellen, are more successful and talented than she––although when they appear on the show, Mama manages to belittle them as well (the difference being that they won't tolerate this type of treatment while Eunice and Larry will).

In contrast to Mama's Family, where she's portrayed as more independent and active, she's portrayed as a dependent senior in "The Family" sketches. Ever an aggressor, Mama's often the one stirring up all the conflict and commotion among the three. Sometimes when they're all starting to get along (an ephemeral occurrence on the show, often arising from a mercurial trait in all the characters), Mama will say something that she's fully aware will provoke Eunice and Ed. In fact, one of Eunice's more commonly used catchphrases is based on this behavior from Mama: "Don't you start with me, ol' lady!"

Mama originally lives on her own in "The Family" sketches, but ends up moving in with Eunice and Ed when old age catches up to her. It's worth noting as well that the home Mama is said and shown to have raised her children in is different among "The Family" sketches, the Eunice movie, and Mama's Family. Moreover, there are slight changes between the home used in the first life of Mama's Family and its second life.

- Ed Higgins (Harvey Korman) – As the uncouth, inelegant, slovenly, goofy, quirky and fiercely ill-tempered son-in-law of Mama and the husband to Eunice. Ed is quick to become irritated and fiercely so by his wife and mother-in-law and doesn't hesitate to show it. When they're not at each other's throats, Eunice and Mama regularly bash Ed. Mama antagonizes Ed with putdowns over what a failure and unsuccessful slob he is, and Eunice regularly nags at him about his "inconsiderate" treatment of her and her needs. Though Ed occasionally capitulates to his wife's browbeating behaviors and his mother-in-law's carping, he has no qualms about exploding at and bickering with them both, although it only gets him into shouting matches and heated altercations with Mama and Eunice, who quickly move into bickering with each other in the process. Ed has little to show for his life, and his low-class hardware job, low quality style, and cheapness gives Eunice's rants and Mama's insults credibility. While in "The Family" sketches, as well as the Eunice movie, Ed leaves and divorces Eunice, he's seen married to her in all of their Mama's Family appearances.

=== Recurring characters ===
- Phillip Harper (Roddy McDowall) – In "The Family" sketches, Phillip was the eldest of Mama's three sons. He was a successful Hollywood-based screenwriter and Pulitzer/Nobel Peace Prize-winning author. Although Phillip was Mama's favorite (along with Ellen), he was never spared Thelma's criticism, insults, or wrath.
- Larry Harper (Alan Alda) – In "The Family" sketches, Larry was Mama's middle son. He was a free-spirit who is a commercial illustrator, and he was teased by Ed, who thought that painting was somewhat sissy. He appeared in the Christmas sketch, coming home for Christmas after five years, and he is unmarried.
- Jack Harper (Tom Smothers) – In "The Family" sketches, Jack was Mama's youngest son. He was visited by Eunice, Ed, and Mama in the hospital. It is mentioned that he and his wife Janie have children and that he works in sales.
- Ellen Harper (Betty White) – In "The Family" sketches, Ellen was older than Eunice, and was as haughty, snobby and stuck on herself as she was on Mama's Family with a difference: She would snap back at her mother with more frequency and didn't even try to hide her glee when she got something that Eunice wanted. She was frequently reluctant to help Eunice to the point of selfishness, or be around her mother or Eunice for any extended period of time. She was married (her husband originally referred to as Tom, then Arthur, and later as Bruce) and had two spoiled daughters, Mary Beth and Debbie. At one time, it was revealed that Ellen's full name was Mary Ellen.
- Mickey Hart (Tim Conway) – In "The Family" sketches, Mickey was Ed's employee at the hardware store. He wears a hearing aid and calls Mama "Mother Harper" and has referred to her as "Thelma."
- Dan Fogarty (Dick Van Dyke) – An old friend of Ed's who stayed with Eunice for a short time after Ed abandoned her in the final season (Harvey Korman had left the series). Eunice evidently was rather sweet on him, but because Van Dyke left the show in the middle of the season, the relationship never was developed.
- Carl Harper – A predominately unseen character, he is the deceased husband of Mama and father of Ellen, Eunice, Jack, Larry, and Philip. He spends the vast majority of his time nested on the toilet in the bathroom with the door closed. In fact, he died on the toilet. In flashbacks, Carl's portrayed as a grouch who doesn't want to be interrupted during his long hours on the toilet, even for emergencies.

== Editions of "The Family" by seasons ==
Nº	Season	Episode	Airdate	Title & Description	Guest Stars
1	Season 7 (1973–1974)	Ep 22	March 16, 1974	The Reunion – Phillip comes home for a visit.	Roddy McDowall as Phillip
2	Season 8 (1974–1975)	Ep 1	September 14, 1974	Brotherly Love – Mama, Eunice and Ed come back home from church.	
3	Season 8 (1974–1975)	Ep 5	October 12, 1974	Hospital Visit – The family visits Jack in the hospital.	Tom Smothers as Jack
4	Season 8 (1974–1975)	Ep 9	November 16, 1974	Sorry! – The family plays Sorry!	
5	Season 8 (1974–1975)	Ep 13	December 21, 1974	Home for the Holidays – Larry visits the family for Christmas.	Alan Alda as Larry
6	Season 8 (1974–1975)	Ep 16	January 25, 1975	Mama's Beau – Mama has a new beau, Willie.	William Conrad as Willie
7	Season 8 (1974–1975)	Ep 19	February 22, 1975	Mama's Accident – Mama breaks her leg and stays with Eunice and Ed while recuperating.	
8	Season 8 (1974–1975)	Ep 21	March 15, 1975	Visit to Phillip – The family visits Phillip in California.	Roddy McDowall as Phillip
9	Season 8 (1974–1975)	Ep 24	April 5, 1975	Hardware Store – Eunice and Mama visit Ed at the hardware store.	
10	Season 9 (1975–1976)	Ep 1	September 13, 1975	Eunice Splits – Ed goes to a massage parlor.	Jim Nabors as Cab Driver
11	Season 9 (1975–1976)	Ep 4	October 4, 1975	The Flashback – A flashback to when Eunice and Ed were dating.	
12	Season 9 (1975–1976)	Ep 7	October 25, 1975	Charades – Mickey has dinner with the family and they play charades.	
13	Season 9 (1975–1976)	Ep 10	November 15, 1975	Teacher's Dilemma – The family has a conference with Bubba's school teacher.	Maggie Smith as Mrs. Collins
14	Season 9 (1975–1976)	Ep 11	November 22, 1975	Mama's Birthday – Ellen comes over to Eunice's for Mama's birthday celebration.	Betty White as Ellen
15	Season 9 (1975–1976)	Ep 14	December 13, 1975	Aunt Mae Is Dead – The family goes to Mama's sister Mae's funeral.	
16	Season 9 (1975–1976)	Ep 20	February 7, 1976	The Restaurant – The family goes to an expensive restaurant.	
17	Season 9 (1975–1976)	Ep 21	February 14, 1976	Friend from the Past – Eunice reunites with her high school friend Midge.	Joanne Woodward as Midge Gibson
18	Season 9 (1975–1976)	Ep 24	March 13, 1976	The Business Fair – Eunice is jealous when Ed and Mickey go to a hardware convention.	
19	Season 10 (1976–1977)	Ep 1	September 25, 1976	Monopoly – The family plays Monopoly.	
20	Season 10 (1976–1977)	Ep 4	October 16, 1976	The Rehearsal – Eunice rehearses a play with her director Mavis Danton.	Madeline Kahn as Mavis Danton
21	Season 10 (1976–1977)	Ep 7	November 6, 1976	Mickey's Apartment – The family visits Mickey's apartment for dinner.	
22	Season 10 (1976–1977)	Ep 12	December 11, 1976	The Attic – Eunice, Ed and Ellen help Mama clean the attic.	Betty White as Ellen
23	Season 10 (1976–1977)	Ep 19	February 12, 1977	The Gong Show – Eunice appears on The Gong Show.	Chuck Barris, Jaye P. Morgan, Jamie Farr and Allen Ludden as themselves
24	Season 11 (1977–1978)	Ep 1	September 24, 1977	Visit from Dan – Dan, an old friend of Ed's, comes to dinner; Ed has left Eunice.	
25	Season 11 (1977–1978)	Ep 4	October 15, 1977	Overnight Guest – Mama drops in on a newly divorced Eunice unannounced.	
26	Season 11 (1977–1978)	Ep 7	November 5, 1977	Password^{[A]} – Eunice and Mama play Password with Mickey and Dan.	
27	Season 11 (1977–1978)	Ep 12	December 11, 1977	Mama's Exodus – Eunice and Mickey try to coax Mama into a retirement home.	
28	Season 11 (1977–1978)	Ep 15	January 8, 1978	Honorary Degree – Phillip visits again to receive an honorary degree.	Roddy McDowall as Phillip
29	Season 11 (1977–1978)	Ep 21	March 5, 1978	Ellen's Anniversary – Eunice and Mama visit Ellen before her anniversary party.	Betty White as Ellen
30	Season 11 (1977–1978)	Ep 24	March 29, 1978	The Psychiatrist – Eunice and Mama visit a psychiatrist.	Craig Richard Nelson as Psychiatrist
31	Carol Burnett & Company	Ep 1.4	September 8, 1979	Carl's Grave – Eunice and Mama visit the late Carl Harper's gravesite.	

^{A} An unaired taping of this episode included Lawrence's outtake where, after Mickey Hart finishes a long story about an elephant, Mama asks "You sure that little asshole's through?" The censored outtake was subsequently aired on TV's Bloopers & Practical Jokes.

== Other appearances ==
- Password Plus (1980) – Carol Burnett and Vicki Lawrence appear as contestants in character as Eunice Higgins and Thelma Harper vs. Joanna Gleason and McLean Stevenson (also in character as Morgan Winslow and Larry Alder from their sitcom Hello, Larry) during the TV game show's "All-Star Week" from March 10 to 14.
- The Tim Conway Show (1980) – Carol Burnett appears in the audience in character as Eunice Higgins, giddy about being on TV, and addresses the camera to say hello "to my Mama!"
