= Thelma Harper =

Thelma Mae Crowley Harper
- Vicki Lawrence as Thelma Harper from her kitchen on an episode of Mama's Family
- First appearance: "Phillip's Visit" (The Family sketch)
- Last appearance: The Queen Latifah Show (May 20, 2014)
- Created by: Dick Clair; Jenna McMahon
- Portrayed by: Vicki Lawrence

In-universe information
- Alias: Thelma Mae Crowley (maiden name)
- Nickname: Mama
- Gender: Female
- Title: Mayor of Raytown; President of Church Ladies League
- Occupation: Housewife (prior to the show); Secretary at the Raytown Travel Agency (Season 1); Worked for "Meals on Wheels" (Season 2); Mayor of Raytown (Season 2); Cashier at McRays Burgers (Season 3); Customer Consultant at Food Circus (Season 2); 10% shareholder in Bernice Co. (Season 6–present)
- Family: Frank Crowley (father; deceased); Grandma Crowley (mother; deceased); Clyde Crowley (brother); Fran Crowley (sister; deceased); Sonja Harper (granddaughter); Vinton "Buzz" Harper, Jr. (grandson); Tiffany Thelma Harper (granddaughter); Bubba Higgins (grandson); Billy Joe Higgins (grandson)
- Spouse: Carl Harper (1942–1973)
- Children: Ellen Jackson; Eunice Harper Higgins; Vinton Harper; Larry Harper
- Relatives: Effie Harper (sister-in-law); Oscar (uncle; deceased); Gert Corey (cousin); Lydia (cousin); Ina (aunt; deceased); Leota (cousin); Don (uncle); Lorraine (aunt); Cora (cousin); Ludie (cousin; deceased); Mae (aunt; deceased); Eloise (aunt; deceased); Grandma Harper (mother-in-law; deceased); Grandpa Harper (father-in-law; deceased); Verne (brother-in-law; deceased); Ada (sister-in-law; deceased); Sonya (aunt); Roy Harper (brother-in-law); Myrtis (aunt); Bertram (uncle); Willis (uncle); Izzy (cousin); Ida Sue (cousin by marriage); Fern (aunt); Penelope (aunt); Lucille (cousin; deceased); Leroy (cousin); Evelyn (cousin); Minnie (aunt; deceased); Vivian (aunt); Dooley (uncle; deceased)

Thelma Harper, better known as Mama, is a fictional character played by American actress Vicki Lawrence. Mama is a purse-lipped, thickset senior citizen in her mid-to-late 60s. She has lived in an unspecified part of the Southern United States called "Raytown" for her entire life, evident from the southern drawl of her speech. Mama is an exaggerated version of a prototypical middle twentieth century lower middle class grandmother in the United States South. The character was originally created for Carol Burnett; however, Burnett preferred to play Mama's daughter Eunice Harper Higgins, which resulted in Lawrence being cast as Mama.

The Mama character first appeared in "The Family" sketches on The Carol Burnett Show (1974–1978) and Carol Burnett & Company (1979); followed by Eunice (a 1982 made-for-TV movie expanding on "The Family" sketches); then peaking as lead character on Mama's Family (first on NBC 1983–84, then revolutionized in first-run syndication 1986–1990); and finally in Lawrence's ongoing untelevised stand-up comedy routine, Vicki Lawrence & Mama: A Two-Woman Show since 2001.

With Lawrence continuing to play the role into the present day, Mama has also made numerous other post-television show guest appearances, such as on Hollywood Squares; The Talk; "Larry the Cable Guy's Christmas Spectacular" (2007); "Betty White's 2nd Annual 90th Birthday" (February 5, 2013); The Queen Latifah Show (May 20, 2014); etc. In the late 1970s, Vicki appeared as Mama along with her daughter, Eunice (portrayed by Burnett), in an episode of Password Plus.

In her autobiography, Vicki called Thelma "the only role which I got to go to makeup to get ugly!" It is Lawrence's most well-known role.

== Mama character timeline (1970s–present) ==
Carol Burnett was originally intended to play the "Mama" character while Lawrence was to play her daughter, but because of Burnett's desire to swap roles, Lawrence played Mama.

In the seventh season of The Carol Burnett Show in 1974, "The Family" skit was created, which debuted the "Mama" role. Becoming a major hit with audiences, Lawrence ended up performing the character on The Carol Burnett Show's The Family for the final 5 seasons of the show's 11 season run. Four years after The Carol Burnett show ended, the TV-movie-special Eunice (the character of Mama's daughter) was broadcast. The special included the key characters from "The Family" sketches, including Mama. The skit was spun off again with a sitcom that surrounded the "Mama" character. Mama's Family has two contrasting incarnations. This is as result of the show's cancellation from NBC after one and a half seasons (1983 to 1984) and its subsequent high ratings in reruns. In 1986, the program was relaunched in first-run syndication, where it enjoyed a successful revival through to its series finale in 1990.

By the "Mama" character's full development on the second life of Mama's Family, Thelma had spent much of her time tending to the housework and nurturance of her loved ones, constantly engaged in cooking, cleaning, and providing loving support to her family. She ruled the roost with a smart mouth and snappy retorts; an explosively quick temper; and a brash, rough and abrasive manner. Mama often relaxed with a can of beer, and when taking exception with something or someone, a purse whack, hand slam, object slam, shove, startling shout, or a healthy dose of wisecracking insults and criticisms at the source of her irritation and displeasure.

== Appearance ==
Mama's appearance is based on that of a stereotypical elderly woman. She is a thickset, pursed-lipped widow, with silvery blue curls. All of her outfits have consisted of various short-sleeved, floral-print dresses that carry lace collars. As much of Mama's time on Mama's Family was spent cooking and cleaning, her dresses were often worn with an overlapping apron. Mama's lower legs have been clasped by visible support hose since the outset of Mama's Family; she wore no support hose during "The Family" sketches, but was seen in them by the arrival of the Eunice movie. For footwear, Mama regularly wore white orthopedic, colonial shoes that took an oxford heels style.

== Persona ==
=== Character development and evolution ===
The character of "Mama" was originally based, at least in part, on the relationship between Carol Burnett's mother and grandmother and was intended to be a maternal, elderly version of Eunice. Lawrence has noted that she also used her southern ex-mother-in-law and her own grandmother from Missouri in the genesis of Mama.

The persona of the "Mama" character was redeveloped for Mama's Family after the character's inception on The Family skits. Lawrence recognized the modifications early on and disapproved. She has revealed that she originally found the softening of the "Mama" character to be unfunny. However, Lawrence has stated that after counsel about the character needing reshaping to fit sitcom television from Harvey Korman (played the "Ed" character), she came to accept and later embrace the adjusted version of Mama. She has stated that to this day, she appreciates how the character has "blossomed" and "matured" from "The Family" sketches. The original writers of the character, Dick Clair and Jenna McMahon, had based Mama on their real-life family members and thus disapproved of the adjustments.

== Post-Mama's Family appearances ==
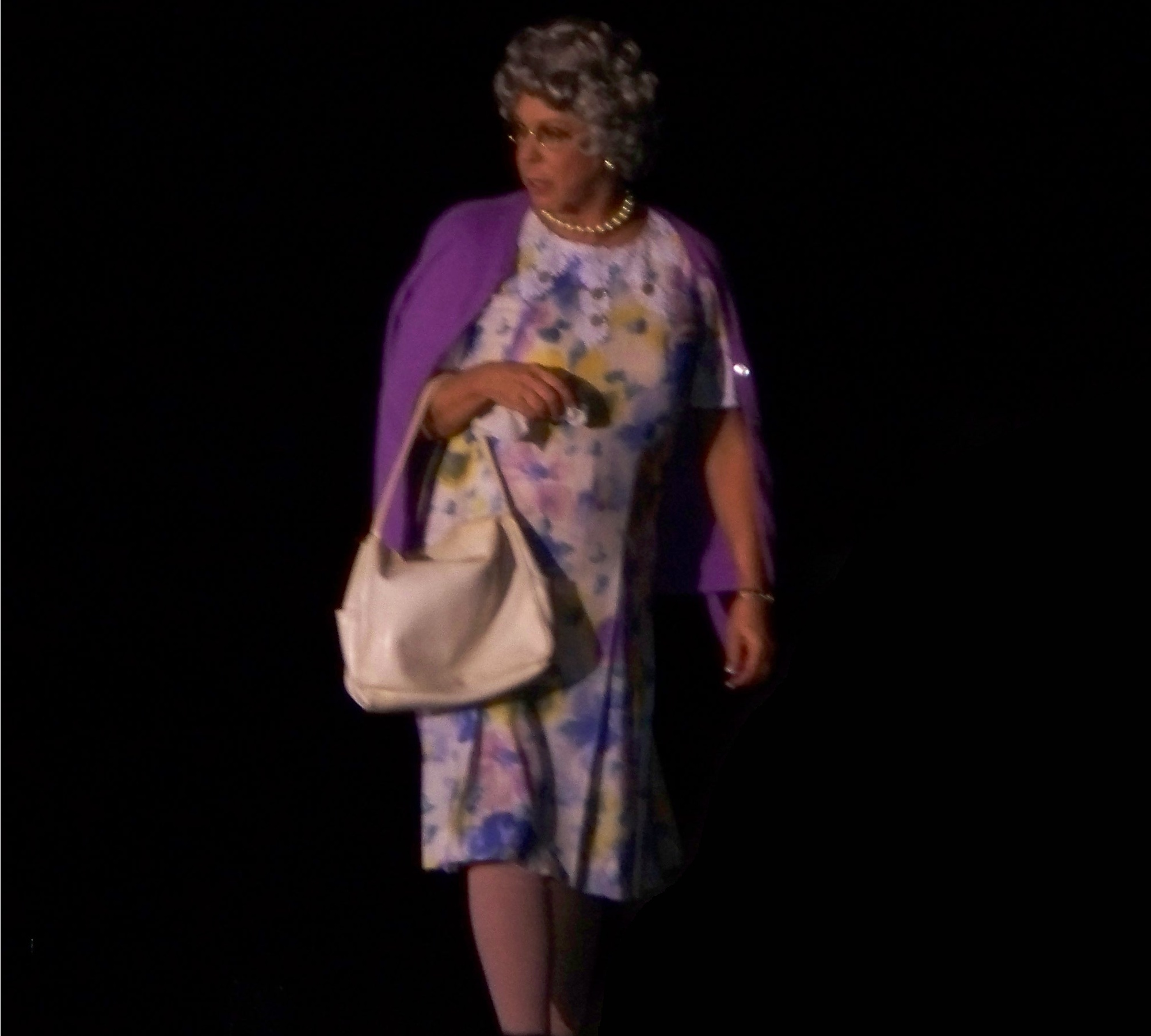
Vicki Lawrence as Thelma Harper, 2009

Lawrence has resurrected the character of Thelma (still in her late sixties) several times on the game show Hollywood Squares, on stage in her two-woman show, on her talk show in the early 1990s, on the TNN talk show Primetime Country and in the 2008 TV Land Awards, and on numerous comedy tours.

Thelma "wrote" a book in 2008 entitled Mama for President.

On October 29, 2012, Thelma was seen once again on Logo's RuPaul's Drag Race: All Stars as the special comedian in which the contestants had to interact and have a comedic sketch. Later seen out of the Thelma persona, Vicki Lawrence played as a special guest judge to the contestants alongside RuPaul.

On February 5, 2013, Thelma appeared in a special sketch during Betty White's 2nd Annual 90th Birthday in honor of Betty White. The sketch features a Beverly Hills high school class reunion with three of Betty's "classmates" from 1939. The sketch has a run time just over two minutes.
