= Ken Berry =

American actor (1933–2018)

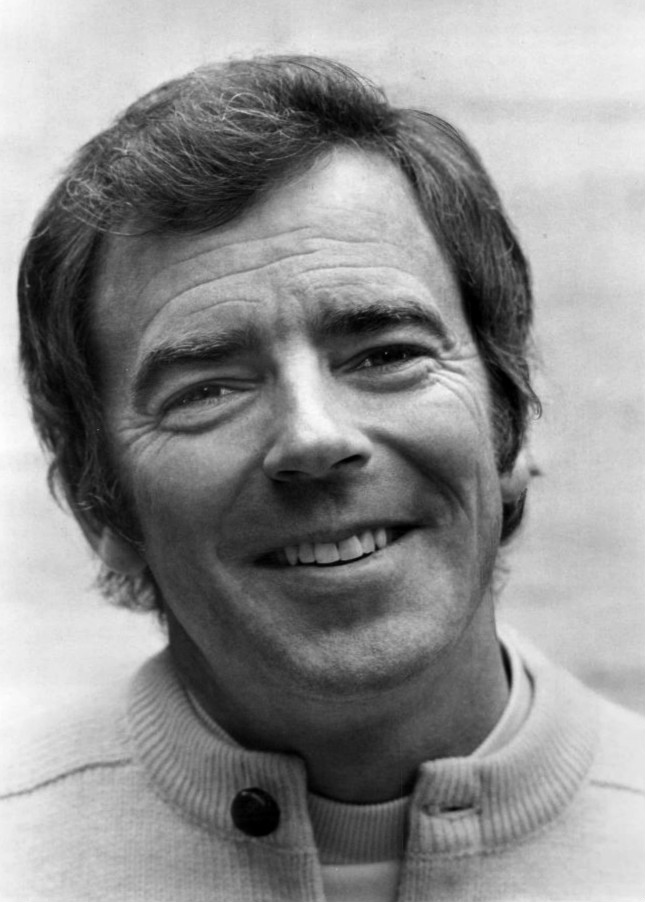
- Berry in 1972
- Born: Kenneth Ronald Berry; November 3, 1933; Moline, Illinois, U.S.
- Died: December 1, 2018 (aged 85); Burbank, California, U.S.
- Occupations: Actor; comedian; dancer; singer
- Years active: 1954–1999
- Spouse: Jackie Joseph (m. 1960; div. 1976)
- Partner: Susie Walsh (1994–2018; his death)
- Children: 3 (Note: One biological child and two adopted children. All children are deceased.)
- Relatives: Bill Bateman (former-son-in-law)

Kenneth Ronald Berry (November 3, 1933 – December 1, 2018) was an American actor, comedian, dancer, and singer. Berry starred on the television series F Troop (1965–1967), Mayberry R.F.D. (1968–1971) and Mama's Family (1983–1990). He also appeared on Broadway in The Billy Barnes Revue, headlined as George M. Cohan in the musical George M! and provided comic relief for the medical drama Dr. Kildare with Richard Chamberlain in the 1960s.

== Early life ==
Berry was born in Moline, Illinois in 1933 of Swedish and English descent, one of two children of an accountant, Darrell Berry, and his wife, Bernice (née Larson). He realized he wanted to be a dancer and singer at age 12, as he watched a children's dance performance during a school assembly. He then dreamed of starring in musicals and went to movie theaters to watch Fred Astaire and Gene Kelly in some of his favorite films such as Easter Parade, Royal Wedding, On the Town, and Summer Stock.

Berry soon began attending tap dance classes, and by age 15 he won a local talent competition sponsored by radio and television big band leader Horace Heidt. Impressed by the young dancer's talent, Heidt asked him to join his popular traveling performance ensemble, "The Horace Heidt Youth Opportunity Program". Berry accepted and toured the United States and Europe for 15 months, dancing and singing for the public and at post-World War II United States Air Force bases overseas. Berry during those months made lasting relationships with several ensemble members, including Heidt's son, Horace Jr., who later launched a big band and radio career.

=== Army service ===
Following his graduation from Moline High School, Berry volunteered for the United States Army, and was assigned to Fort Bragg in Fayetteville, North Carolina. His first year in the Army was spent in the artillery, where he entered a post talent contest; the winner would go on Arlene Francis's Soldier Parade in New York City. Berry, who always carried his tap shoes with him, worked out a routine and a few hours later won the contest. He headed to New York for his television debut.

Berry's second and final year in the Army was with Special Services, under Sergeant Leonard Nimoy, who encouraged Berry to go to Hollywood and pursue acting. As a part of Special Services, he toured Army posts and officers' clubs, entertaining the troops as well as visiting colleges for recruiting purposes. Soon, another talent competition was held, the All Army Talent Competition, to find service personnel to appear on Ed Sullivan's Toast of the Town. Berry placed third in the "Specialty Act" category with the song "There'll Be Some Changes Made" and returned to New York City and television.

== Career ==
=== Film work ===
The Sullivan appearance was to take place shortly before Berry would muster out of the Army. Nimoy sent telegrams to several studios and talent agents asking them to watch Berry on the show. The performance led to an offer from 20th Century Fox and a screen test at Universal Studios. Berry signed with an agent as soon as he arrived in Hollywood. He accepted Universal's offer and began as a contract player. Soon he was being groomed to take over for Donald O'Connor in the Francis the Talking Mule movie series; however, Mickey Rooney became available and got the part. At Universal, Berry took full advantage of the studio's talent development program, and later, under the G.I. Bill, he took jazz dance, ballet, vocal, and additional acting classes. The movie musicals Berry admired had already seen their heyday; however, acting, which he once thought of as "something I would do between song and dance routines", became the basis of his career.

Berry went on to star in the 1969 musical comedy Hello Down There — reissued as Sub a Dub Dub — as Mel Cheever, the nemesis of Tony Randall and Janet Leigh. He also starred in 1969's made-for-television film Wake Me When the War Is Over, with Eva Gabor and Werner Klemperer. and with Denver Pyle in 1976's Guardian of the Wilderness, the story of Galen Clark, the man who created Yosemite National Park. Berry also earned broader success as a Disney star in the films Herbie Rides Again in 1974, with Helen Hayes and Stefanie Powers, and The Cat from Outer Space in 1978, with Sandy Duncan and McLean Stevenson.

=== Las Vegas ===
In 1956, after being released from Universal, Berry ventured to Las Vegas, where he opened for and joined Abbott and Costello in their stage act, performing sketches and song and dance routines at the Sahara Hotel and Casino. While working with Abbott and Costello, he met Dee Arlen, an actress whom he credited with getting him his first big break. This was Berry's first performance on the Las Vegas Strip. Then, in 1957, Berry was asked by Ken Murray, a well-known vaudeville performer, to join his stage variety show, The Ken Murray Blackouts. The Blackouts played to standing-room-only audiences, and Berry was asked to choreograph and perform the opening number for the show when it played the Riviera hotel and casino in Las Vegas. Berry eventually returned to Las Vegas again in the 1970s at the invitation of Andy Griffith. Griffith, with Berry and Jerry Van Dyke, played Caesars Palace, where Berry performed song and dance numbers sandwiched by Andy and Jerry's stand-up routines.

=== The Billy Barnes Revue ===
Actress Dee Arlen referred Berry for a role in the show In League with Ivy at the Cabaret Concert Theatre, a nightclub in Los Angeles. There he met famed composer–impresario Billy Barnes, the play's composer. Barnes brought Berry into The Billy Barnes Revue ensemble, Berry's next break, and he performed in many of Barnes' shows in the coming years. While with Barnes, Berry worked with other performers, including his future wife Jackie Joseph and Joyce Jameson, Bert Convy, Patti Regan, Ann Morgan Guilbert, Lennie Weinrib, and sketch writer/director Bob Rodgers. Several cast albums were made. In November 1959, the original cast of the Broadway show was replaced two weeks after a legal dispute with the producers over a canceled performance. The cast had missed its flight from Chicago after a promotional appearance on Playboy's Penthouse, and refunds had to be made to the ticket holders. He performed in several stage shows in Los Angeles.

=== Television work ===
Arthur Godfrey's Talent Scouts was a prime time television talent contest that ran from 1946 to 1958. The winner got a week's work on Godfrey's morning television program, which was simulcast on radio. Berry won in 1957, performed his week on the show, and was then asked back for six more weeks. He traveled with Godfrey and performed on remote broadcasts in an Omaha stockyard, in Seattle at a lumber camp, at the Boeing aircraft plant, and at the San Diego Zoo. Berry came up with a new routine for every show, which aired daily.

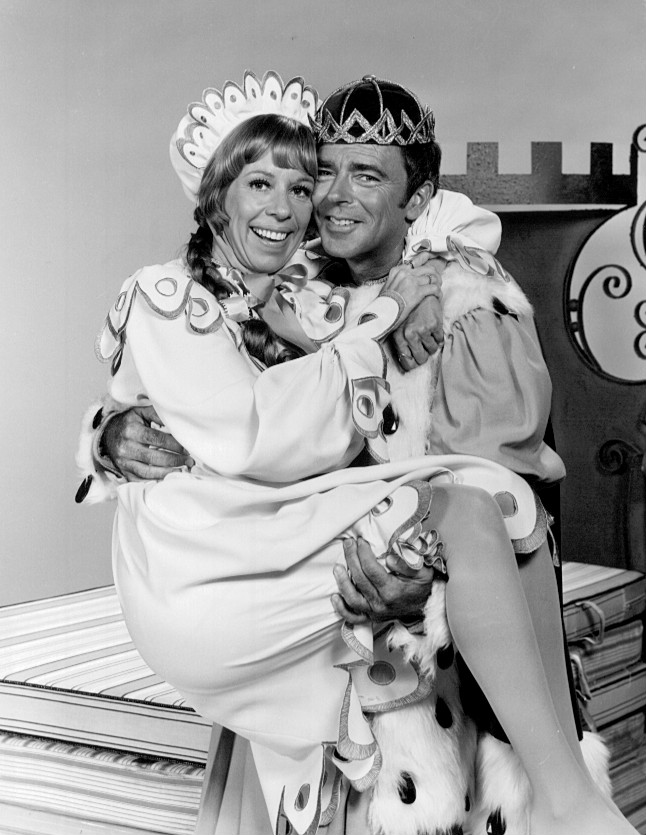
Berry and Carol Burnett in Once Upon a Mattress in 1972

The Billy Barnes Review was popular with Hollywood, and one evening Carol Burnett was in Los Angeles and saw Berry in the show. She was appearing on The Garry Moore Show in New York and convinced the producers to sign Berry as a guest star. Burnett became a key ally for Berry, using him on her own special, which eventually became CBS's The Carol Burnett Show. Ken was one of Burnett's most frequent guest stars along with Jim Nabors and Steve Lawrence. In 1972, Berry and Burnett appeared together in the color remake of Burnett's Broadway hit, Once Upon a Mattress for CBS.

A notable dramatic performance by Berry was 1982's television movie Eunice, which was based on The Carol Burnett Show sketch, The Family. The Family was something of a pilot for Mama's Family. Berry played Phillip, Eunice's brother, in the special; however he went on to play Vinton, a different brother, on Mama's Family.

His collaboration with Carol Burnett continued with the 1993 theatrical production of From the Top in Long Beach, California.

The Billy Barnes Review also led to another important connection in his career when he was spotted by Lucille Ball. Ball quickly asked him to join her new talent development program at Desilu, similar to the "talent pools" – known as talent "programs" – that the other studios had. He was under contract with Desilu for six months, performing for both Ball and Barnes at the same time. The reviews for The Billy Barnes Review were largely positive, and additional investors contributed the extra money needed to move the show from the York Playhouse to Broadway, which meant he had to take leave from Desilu.

After returning from New York in 1960, Berry was brought back to Desilu to play Woody, a bell hop, in 10 episodes of CBS's The Ann Sothern Show, which was set in a New York hotel called the Bartley House. The character Woody served as a "Greek chorus of one" on the series.

In 1968, Ball asked Berry to guest star on The Lucy Show, where he played a bank client needing a loan to start a dance studio. He performed a tribute to the Fred Astaire number "Steppin' Out with My Baby" and a duet with Ball for a rendition of "Lucy's Back in Town".

After numerous smaller roles, Berry was cast as one of three comic relief characters on Dr. Kildare from 1961 to 1966. A regular on the series, Berry played Dr. Kapish. He also played a dance instructor several times on The Dick Van Dyke Show.

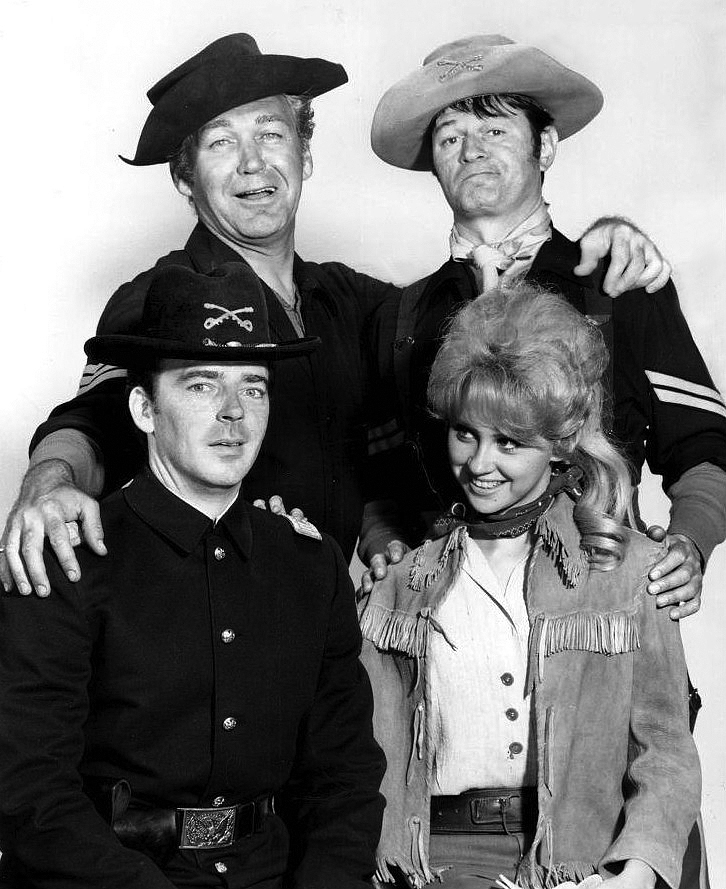
F Troop cast--clockwise from top, Forrest Tucker, Larry Storch, Melody Patterson and Berry. (1965)

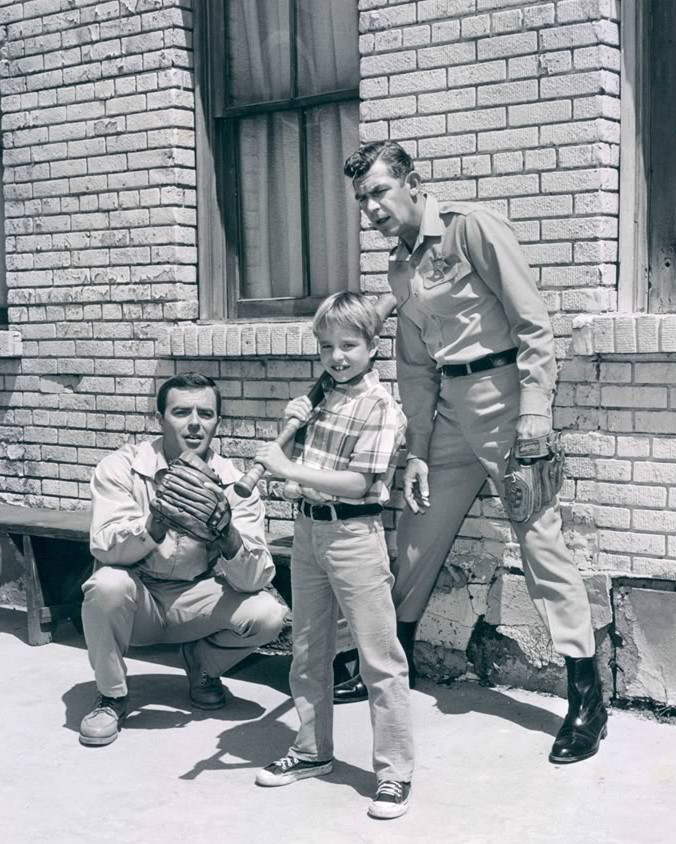
Berry, Andy Griffith and Buddy Foster in Mayberry R.F.D., 1968

Berry continued doing guest roles, but while performing a small part on the short-lived George Burns-Connie Stevens sitcom Wendy and Me, both Burns and Stevens recommended him for the pilot of F Troop for ABC, a western spoof where he played the accident-prone Captain Parmenter—his first starring role in a weekly sitcom.

Berry's co-stars were Forrest Tucker and Larry Storch. Berry called his time on F-Troop "two years of recess" as the entire cast spent time between takes trying to make each other laugh. His dancing ability allowed him to perform choreographed pratfalls over hitching posts, sabers, and trash cans.

In 1967, during the second year of F-Troop, Dick Linke — who was Berry's manager, and also managed Andy Griffith and Jim Nabors — pitched an F Troop stage show to Bill Harrah, founder of Harrah's Entertainment, which included a casino and hotel in Reno, Nevada. Harrah went for it, and Berry, Larry Storch, Forrest Tucker, and James Hampton put together a show, hiring writers and a choreographer to assist. While performing the Reno show they received word that F Troop had been canceled due to a financial dispute between the production company and the studio.

The next year, Berry was cast in the featured role of Sam Jones, a widowed farmer, on the last few episodes of The Andy Griffith Show. He then took the leading role on the retitled show, Mayberry R.F.D.. In September 1968, Berry led the cast of Mayberry R.F.D. as Griffith's character receded. Most of the regular characters stayed with the show. Andy and wife Helen left after a few episodes in season two. Series writers used Berry's "trouper" talents in stories about church revues and talent contests. On the 1970 Mayberry R.F.D. episode "The Charity", he and co-star Paul Hartman performed a soft-shoe routine. Berry sometimes ended a show on the porch at dusk, serenading others with such songs as "Carolina Moon". In spite of finishing 15th place for season three, Mayberry R.F.D. was canceled in 1971 in what was called "the rural purge", where shows set in a bucolic locale (The Beverly Hillbillies, Green Acres, and Petticoat Junction) were replaced with the more "hip" fare of Norman Lear (All in the Family) and The Mary Tyler Moore Show.

After Mayberry R.F.D., Berry starred in several TV movies and his own summer replacement variety show on ABC titled The Ken Berry 'Wow' Show in 1972, which ran for five episodes. This show was a launching pad for future stars Steve Martin, Cheryl Ladd, and Teri Garr.

In 1973 Sherwood Schwartz wrote a spin-off of The Brady Bunch, titled Kelly's Kids, which featured Berry as the adoptive father of three diverse boys (black, white, and Asian). The pilot failed to interest ABC.

Over the next two decades Berry guest starred on many shows, including The Bob Newhart Show, The Julie Andrews Hour, several Mitzi Gaynor specials, The Sonny & Cher Comedy Hour, The Donny & Marie Show, The Love Boat, Fantasy Island, Grizzly Adams, CHiPs, The Golden Girls, and Little House on the Prairie.

In 1983, Berry was cast as Vinton Harper in Mama's Family, a spin-off from The Carol Burnett Show with comic actors including Vicki Lawrence, Dorothy Lyman, and Rue McClanahan. Betty White and Carol Burnett appeared as guest stars. The first two seasons aired on NBC and then the show was cancelled in 1984. In 1986, it was picked-up for first run syndication. Lawrence, Berry, and Lyman all returned. McClanahan and White were already taping The Golden Girls so were no longer available. White did make one guest appearance. Burnett did not appear due to her recent divorce from long-time husband Joe Hamilton, the show's producer. Beverly Archer and Allan Kayser joined the cast as neighbor Iola Boylen and Mama's grandson (Eunice's son) Bubba Higgins, respectively. The reboot of Mama's Family was successful, airing until 1990 with a total of 130 episodes produced.

During and after Mama's Family, Berry toured the United States in various theatrical performances, including multiple performances of Sugar with co-stars such as Donald O'Connor, Mickey Rooney, Soupy Sales, and Bobby Morse, The Music Man with Susan Watson (Patrick Swayze and Lisa Niemi were in the chorus), I Do! I Do! with Loretta Swit, and Gene Kelly's A Salute to Broadway with Howard Keel and Mimi Hines. Kelly, who was Berry's idol, was set to direct the production, but fell ill.

In his younger years, Berry signed with a modeling agency that put him in a variety of spots, including advertisements for tissues, cigarettes, cereal, and a car commercial. Years later, after signing with a commercial agent, Berry was a spokesman in commercials for Kinney Shoes from the mid-1970s to the early 1980s, singing and dancing to the "Great American Shoe Store" jingle.

=== Discography ===
Berry's first recording experience came with the Billy Barnes cast albums: one from the Broadway performance of The Billy Barnes Review and the second in Billy Barnes' L.A.

After an appearance on The Andy Williams Show, Williams asked Berry to record a solo album on his new Barnaby label. Backed by a full orchestra, Ken Berry RFD was released in 1970.

== Personal life ==
Berry married Jackie Joseph, a Billy Barnes castmate, on May 29, 1960. On November 29, 1962, their son Joseph Larson Berry was born but died 6 days later on December 5, 1962. They then adopted two children together, John (1964–2016) and Jennifer (1965–2020). They divorced in 1977. His son John, who later became a co-founder of the Indie rock band Idaho, died in 2016 of brain cancer at the age of 51. His daughter Jennifer died in 2020 of natural causes at the age of 55. Berry's longtime partner and companion, Susie Walsh, a stage manager, was with him for the last 24 years.

Berry "loved cars and anything with wheels" from the time he was a young child, particularly smaller cars, and maintained a 1966 Mini Moke. An avid motorcyclist, he camped and rode the local Los Angeles mountain ranges.

== Death ==
Berry died of heart complications in Burbank, California, on December 1, 2018, at the age of 85.

== Credits ==
List of television series credits
Year	Title	Role	Notes
1961–1966	Dr. Kildare	Dr. John Kapish	25 episodes
1965–1967	F Troop	Capt. Wilton Parmenter	65 episodes
1968–1971	Mayberry R.F.D.	Sam Jones	78 episodes
1968–1978	The Carol Burnett Show	Himself	19 episodes
1972	The Ken Berry WOW Show	Himself	5 episodes
1983–1990	Mama's Family	Vinton Harper	130 episodes

List of other television appearances
Year	Title	Role	Notes
1954	Talent Patrol	Himself	
1959	Playboy's Penthouse	Himself	With The Billy Barnes Revue cast
1960	Harrigan and Son	Himself	As Curtis Decker
1960–1961	The Ann Sothern Show	Woody	10 episodes
1961	Hennesey	Ensign Mayberry	
1961	The Asphalt Jungle	Doctor (uncredited)	
1961	The Garry Moore Show	Himself	
1962	GE True	Fiancé	
1962	The Bob Newhart Show	various	
1962	Mrs. G. Goes to College	Oscar	
1962–1963	Ensign O'Toole	Lt. Melton / Calucci	
1963	Burke's Law	Clyde (fella at party)	
1964	Calhoun: County Agent	Otis Sorenson	
1964	Combat!	Motor Sergeant	
1964	The Dick Van Dyke Show	Tony Daniels (choreographer)	
1964	Hazel	Phil Merrick	
1964	The Rogues		
1964–1965	Twelve O'Clock High	Major Bragg / Captain	
1964–1965	No Time for Sergeants	Joe Dalrymple	3 episodes
1965	Rawhide	Lt. Tendall	
1965	The Hollywood Palace	Himself	
1966	Carol & Company	Himself	
1967	Dateline: Hollywood	Himself	
1967	Rowan & Martin's Laugh-In	Himself	
1967	The Danny Thomas Hour	Skip	
1967	The Woody Woodbury Show	Himself	
1967	You Don't Say!	Himself	Game show
1968	The Andy Griffith Show	Sam Jones	4 episodes
1969	Allen Ludden's Gallery	Himself	
1969	The Ed Sullivan Show	Himself	
1969	The Leslie Uggams Show	Himself	
1969	Wake Me When the War Is Over	Lt. Roger Carrington	Made-for-TV movie
1969–1971	The Andy Williams Show	Himself	Guest performer
1971	The First Nine Months are the Hardest	First husband	
1971	The Reluctant Heroes	Lt. Parnell Murphy	
1971	This Is Your Life: Andy Griffith	Himself	
1971–1973	Love, American Style	Various roles	
1972	Arthur Godfrey's Portable Electric Medicine Show	Himself	
1972	Every Man Needs One	David Chase	Made-for-TV movie
1972	Once Upon a Mattress	Dauntless the Drab	
1972	The Julie Andrews Hour	Himself	
1973	Letters from Three Lovers	Jack	
1973–1974	Miss Teenage America Pageant	Himself, Master of Ceremonies	
1973	Mitzi — The First Time	Himself	
1973	The Dean Martin Celebrity Roast: Wilt Chamberlain	Himself	
1973	The Mouse Factory	Himself	
1974	The Brady Bunch	Ken Kelly	Backdoor pilot (episode used as the pilot) for Kelly's Kids (which went unsold)
1974	Stand Up and Cheer	Himself	
1974	Tattletales	Himself	Game show/5 episodes during one week with wife Jackie
1974	The Sonny & Cher Comedy Hour	Himself	
1975	Medical Center	Allan Ronston	
1975	Mitzi and a Hundred Guys	Himself	
1975	The Jim Stafford Show	Himself	
1976	Ellery Queen	DJ Paul Parker / Buddy	
1976	Mitzi — Roarin' in the Twenties	Himself	
1976	Over and Out	Capt. Paddy Patterson	
1977	Dinah!	Himself	
1977	The Life and Times of Grizzly Adams	Will Boker	
1977	The Love Boat II	Dr. Jim Berkley	
1977	Valentine's Second Chance	Jimmy Valentine	
1978	Apple Pie	Salesman	
1978	CBS: On the Air	Himself	
1978–1982	Fantasy Island	Various 7 episodes	S1E15 fool client S2E5 get married S2E20 birthday S3E14 lookalikes S4E6 with affection S4E22 hard knocks S6E2 dancing lady
1979	Featherstone's Nest	Dr. Charlie Featherstone	
1979	Little House on the Prairie	London	Episode: "Annabelle"
1979	The Love Boat	Robert Noble	
1980	CHiPs	Kelly	
1980	The Big Show	Himself	
1982	Eunice	Phil Harper	
1983	Just Men!	Himself	Game show hosted by Betty White
1983	Texaco Star Theatre: Opening Night	Himself	
1985	Late Night with David Letterman	Zeetron	Skit about a family in the future
1985	Gimme a Break!	Dave	Episode: "The Man from Zoron"
1986	Small Wonder	Buddy O'Conner	
1992	The Golden Girls	Thor Anderson	Episode: "Old Boyfriends"
1992	Vicki!: Mama's Family Reunion	Himself	
1997	The New Batman Adventures	Seymour Grey	
1999	Maggie Winters	Sheriff Riley	(final appearance)

List of film credits
Year	Title	Role	Notes
1962	Two for the Seesaw	Larry	Dancing with Shirley MacLaine, Uncredited
1964	The Lively Set	Hotel room service waiter	Uncredited
1969	Hello Down There	Mel Cheever	Alternative title: Sub-A-Dub-Dub
1974	Herbie Rides Again	Willoughby Whitfield	
1976	Guardian of the Wilderness	Zachary More	
1978	The Cat from Outer Space	Dr. Frank Wilson	
1981	Peter-No-Tail	Peter-No-Tail	Voice, US version

List of theater credits
Year	Title	Role	Notes
1957	In League with Ivy	Himself	
1958	Billy Barnes Review	Himself	
1960	Billy Barnes' People	Himself	
1960	Vintage '60	Himself	
1961	Billy Barnes' Hollywood	Himself	
1961	Little Mary Sunshine	Captain 'Big Jim' Warington	
1961	The Billy Barnes Review	Himself	
1963	Billy Barnes' LA	Himself	
1964	The Best of Billy Barnes	Himself	
1974	The Music Man	Prof. Harold Hill	
1975	Gene Kelly's Salute to Broadway	Himself	
1984	Run for Your Wife	John Smith	
1993	From the Top	Various characters	With Carol Burnett
Multiple years	George M!	George M. Cohan	
Multiple years	I Do! I Do!	Michael Snow	
Multiple years	Sugar	Joe	
