= Carol Burnett & Company =

American sketch comedy television show

- Genre: Comedy-variety
- Written by: Ann Elder; Bob Arnott; Kenny Solms; Tim Conway; Arnie Kogen; Bill Richmond; Gene Perret; Dick Clair; Jenna McMahon
- Directed by: Roger Beatty
- Starring: Carol Burnett; Tim Conway; Vicki Lawrence; Kenneth Mars; Craig Richard Nelson
- Theme music composer: Peter Matz
- Composers: Peter Matz; Artie Malvin; Billy Barnes
- Country of origin: United States
- Original language: English
- No. of episodes: 4

Production
- Producer: Joe Hamilton
- Production locations: CBS Television City; Hollywood, California
- Running time: 60 minutes
- Production company: Joe Hamilton Productions

Original release
- Network: ABC
- Release: August 18 – September 8, 1979

Related
- The Carol Burnett Show; The Tim Conway Show Eunice

Carol Burnett & Company is an American four-episode summer variety/sketch comedy television show starring Carol Burnett, Tim Conway, Vicki Lawrence, Kenneth Mars and Craig Richard Nelson. The series served as a continuation of The Carol Burnett Show (1967–1978) and aired on ABC on four consecutive Saturday nights from August 18, 1979, to September 8, 1979.

== Production ==
In the spring of 1979 – a year after The Carol Burnett Show had completed its eleven-season run on CBS – Carol Burnett and her then husband-manager Joe Hamilton were dining in a restaurant with friends (including Tim Conway from The Carol Burnett Show). At that gathering, Burnett started reminiscing about the old show and making suggestions to Conway of future comedy sketches that she wished they could create if the show was still running. Hamilton suggested to Burnett that she do a summer series; Conway immediately agreed.

Taking that idea, Burnett and Hamilton then approached CBS about doing a four-week program in the summer of 1979, but CBS already had their schedule filled for the summer months and rejected the idea. However, ABC was interested and as a result, four postscript episodes of The Carol Burnett Show were produced and most of Burnett's former staff and crew were on board for the new series.

Under the new title Carol Burnett & Company, the series was produced by Joe Hamilton and continued the same format of The Carol Burnett Show, featuring comedy sketches and musical numbers, including favorite characters/sketches such as "Mrs. Wiggins", "The Family", "As the Stomach Turns", and Carol Burnett's impersonation of Queen Elizabeth II.

Her Carol Burnett Show co-stars Tim Conway and Vicki Lawrence were back as regulars; due to the unavailability of Harvey Korman, comic actors Kenneth Mars and Craig Richard Nelson were added to the supporting cast; Ernie Flatt, who had been the choreographer on The Carol Burnett Show during its entire run, was replaced by the show's lead dancer Don Crichton. The guest stars during the four-week period were chronologically Cheryl Ladd, Alan Arkin, Penny Marshall and Sally Field. The show also introduced new sketches and characters, including another one of Conway's creations: a preacher named "Rolly D. Tucker" who gave humorously misguided sermons about life, with shouts of "It don't matter!" interspersed throughout his dissertation.

Much of the staff that worked on Carol Burnett & Company would move on to Conway's eponymous variety show when it premiered in March 1980; Conway brought the Rolly D. Tucker character with him to that series.

== Episode list ==
No.	Guest star	Directed by	Original release date
1	Cheryl Ladd	Roger Beatty	August 18, 1979
Sketches and songs: "Mrs. Wiggins" – Mrs. Wiggins and the Energy Crisis (Carol and Tim); "Lady Gray" / "Boogie Wonderland" (Cheryl Ladd and Dancers); Palimony: Part 1 (Carol, Tim, Vicki, Craig, Kenneth, Cheryl Ladd); Palimony: Part 2 (Carol and Tim); "Just the Way You Are" (Carol and Cheryl Ladd); A spoof of The Andrews Sisters (Carol, Vicki, Cheryl Ladd); "The Best Things in Life Are Free" (Carol); Finale: "I'm So Glad We Had This Time Together" (Carol)
2	Alan Arkin	Roger Beatty	August 25, 1979
Sketches and songs: "The Queen" (Carol and Tim); "I Could Write a Book" (Alan Arkin) / "I Like You" (Carol and Alan Arkin); The Bumbling Burglar (Tim); "Your Lies" (Vicki); The Voice Coach (Carol and Alan Arkin); "The Symphony Conductor – Concerto for Finger" (Tim); "They're Playing Our Song" (Carol and Alan Arkin); "Ring: "Sing" (Vicki); "With a Song in My Heart" (Carol and Craig); Finale: "I'm So Glad We Had This Time Together" (Carol)
3	Penny Marshall	Roger Beatty	September 1, 1979
Sketches and songs: "Ring My Bell" (Carol Burnett); Rocko 37 – a spoof of Rocky sequels (Carol and Tim); The Perfect Stewardess (Carol and Penny Marshall); The Farmer's Wife (Carol); "Salute to Horror Movies" (Carol, Vicki, Penny Marshall); Beyond The Omen (Tim, Kenneth, Penny Marshall); The Comedyville Horror (Carol and Craig); Sexy Dracula (Craig, Carol, Vicki, Penny Marshall); Finale: "I'm So Glad We Had This Time Together" (Carol)
4	Sally Field	Roger Beatty	September 8, 1979
Sketches and songs: "The Family" – Carl's Grave (Carol and Vicki); "You're Moving Out Today" (Tim and Sally Field); The Autograph Fiasco (Sally Field); Rolly D. Tucker (Tim); "As the Stomach Turns" (Carol, Tim, Vicki, Craig, Kenneth, Sally Field); The Charwoman – "Meantime" (Carol); Finale: "I'm So Glad We Had This Time Together" (Carol)
