= The Carol Burnett Show =

American variety/sketch comedy television show (1967–1978)

- Genre: Comedy-variety
- Presented by: Carol Burnett
- Starring: Harvey Korman; Vicki Lawrence; Lyle Waggoner; Tim Conway; Dick Van Dyke
- Announcer: Lyle Waggoner; Ernie Anderson
- Opening theme: "Carol's Theme" by Joe Hamilton
- Country of origin: United States
- Original language: English
- No. of seasons: 11
- No. of episodes: 279

Production
- Executive producers: Bob Banner; Joe Hamilton
- Production locations: CBS Television City; Los Angeles, California
- Camera setup: Multi-camera
- Running time: 54 minutes
- Production companies: Burngood, Inc.; Bob Banner Associates; Punkin' Productions, Inc.; Whacko, Inc.

Original release
- Network: CBS
- Release: September 11, 1967 – March 29, 1978

Related
- Carol Burnett & Company; Eunice; Mama's Family

The Carol Burnett Show is an American variety/sketch comedy television show that originally ran on CBS from September 11, 1967, to March 29, 1978, for 279 episodes, and again with nine episodes in fall 1991. It starred Carol Burnett, Harvey Korman, Vicki Lawrence and Lyle Waggoner. In 1975, frequent guest star Tim Conway became a regular cast member after Waggoner left the series. In 1977, Dick Van Dyke replaced Korman, but it was agreed that he was not a match and he left after 10 episodes.

The series originated in CBS Television City's Studio 33 and won 25 primetime Emmy Awards. In 2013, TV Guide ranked The Carol Burnett Show number 17 on its list of the 60 Greatest Shows of All Time, and in 2007 it was included on the list of Time's 100 Best TV Shows of All Time. In 2023, Variety ranked The Carol Burnett Show #23 on its own list of the 100 greatest TV shows of all time.

After the original run ended, material from 1972 to 1977 (seasons 6–10) was repackaged as a half-hour series known as Carol Burnett and Friends, keeping the sketches but removing the rights protected songs, which has aired in various syndicated outlets more-or-less continuously since the original series ended. Material from the first five seasons did not air, outside of their original run, because of rights clearance issues (different producer) until 2019 when MeTV acquired the rights to these earlier seasons and began airing them. The cast has periodically reunited for various one-off specials and short appearances, and several members of the cast went on to star in Mama's Family (1983–1990), a half-hour situation comedy based on "The Family" sketch series from The Carol Burnett Show.

== Background ==
By 1967, Carol Burnett had been a popular veteran of television for over a decade, having made her first appearances in 1955 on The Paul Winchell Show and the sitcom Stanley starring the comedian Buddy Hackett. In 1959, she became a regular supporting cast member on the CBS-TV variety series The Garry Moore Show. Departing the series in the spring of 1962, she pursued other projects in film, Broadway productions, and headlining her own television specials. Burnett signed a contract with CBS for 10 years which required her to do two guest appearances and a special a year. Within the first five years of this contract, she had the option to "push the button", a phrase the programming executives used, and be put on the air in 30 one-hour, pay-or-play variety shows.

After discussion with her husband Joe Hamilton, in the last week of the fifth year of the contract, Burnett decided to call the head of CBS Michael Dann and exercise the clause. Dann, explaining that variety is a "man's genre", offered Burnett a sitcom called Here's Agnes. Burnett had no interest in doing a sitcom, and because of the contract, CBS was obliged to give Burnett her own variety show.

With the long-running variety show, Burnett and her supporting cast maintained a large following. The show was nominated for 70 Emmys and won 25 times.

== Production ==
=== Cast ===
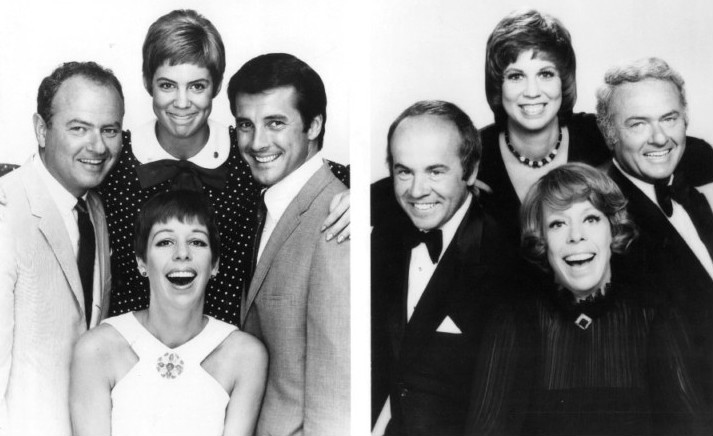
At left, main cast members in 1967 (clockwise from the bottom): Burnett, Harvey Korman, Vicki Lawrence, and Lyle Waggoner. At right, the 1977 cast: Burnett, Tim Conway, Lawrence, and Korman.

In addition to Carol Burnett, the cast consisted of:

- Vicki Lawrence (seasons 1–11)
- Harvey Korman (seasons 1–10)
- Lyle Waggoner (seasons 1–7)
- Tim Conway (seasons 9–11; frequent guest performer in seasons 1–8)
- Dick Van Dyke (first half of season 11)

Comedic actor Harvey Korman had done many guest shots in TV sitcoms. From 1963 to 1967, he had been a semi-regular on the CBS variety series The Danny Kaye Show. Burnett already had become an admirer of Korman's talent as a sketch comedian on that series. When Kaye's program ended in the spring of 1967, Burnett insisted that he be signed for her series and Korman immediately joined The Carol Burnett Show as a regular.

Actor Lyle Waggoner had recently auditioned for the title role in the ABC series Batman but was passed over in favor of Adam West. Shortly after, Waggoner auditioned for the Burnett show and was immediately hired. He would often play a handsome man for Burnett to fawn over. His participation on the series was somewhat modeled on Durward Kirby of The Garry Moore Show, as Waggoner was also the show's announcer in addition to playing in sketches.

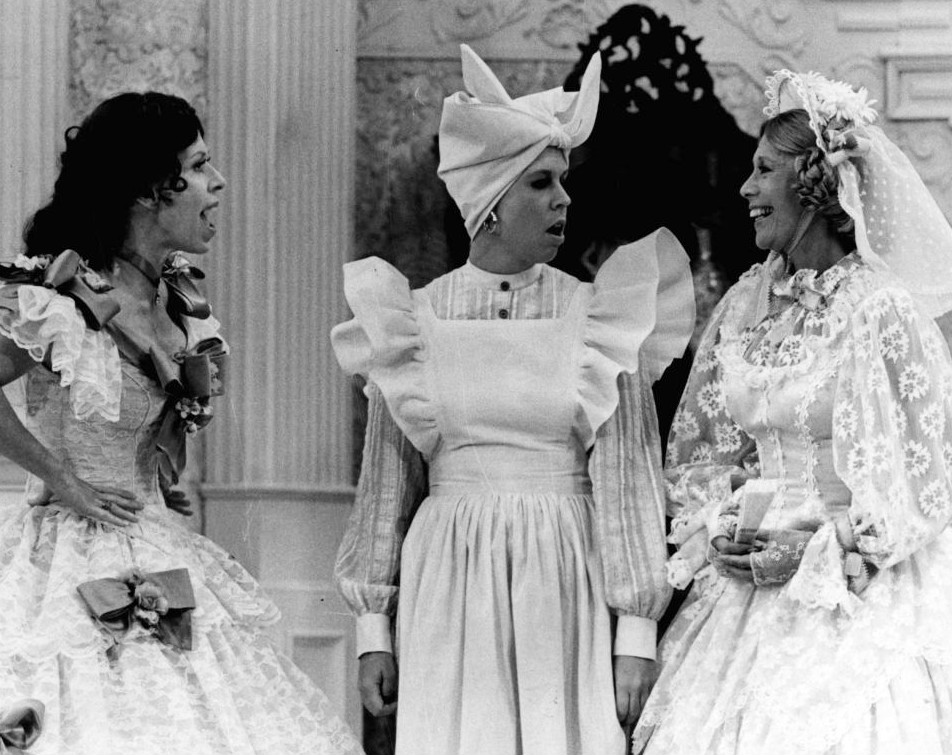
Burnett, Vicki Lawrence, and guest star Dinah Shore in the 1976 "Went with the Wind!" sketch

Vicki Lawrence, a young singer from The Young Americans, wrote a letter to Burnett when she was 17, remarking on their physical resemblance. This led to her audition and getting hired to play Burnett's kid sister in numerous "Carol and Sis" sketches.

=== Costumes ===
Bob Mackie created all of the costumes, including evening gowns, character outfits and dance clothing for guests during the run of the show, including the iconic curtain dress from the "Went with the Wind!" sketch, which is now housed in the Smithsonian Institution. Burnett credited him with coming up with comedic touches for various characters, such as the tight-legged skirt for Mr. Tudball's secretary, Mrs. Wiggins. She told Mackie the skirt was too baggy in the back for her physique, but he told her to stick her bottom out to fill it, resulting in the character's distinctive posture and walk. In a 2003 interview with Terry Gross, she said Mackie would put rice in the “older woman” undergarments, where typically cotton would’ve been used, to make the saggy breasts have weight and movement as the characters walked or danced, such as when Burnett portrayed Norma Desmond or Charo's mother. Burnett estimated that Mackie had created 17,000 outfits for the show, and said his costume work added more humor to some of the skits Burnett felt were weaker than others.

=== Guests ===
Jim Nabors was the guest star on every season premiere of the show. Burnett considered Nabors to be her annual good luck charm.

Celebrity guests who appeared on a semi-regular basis included Steve Lawrence (29 appearances), Ken Berry (20 appearances), Eydie Gorme, Nanette Fabray (13 appearances), Bernadette Peters and Mel Torme (10 appearances).

Other notable guests included Olivia De Havilland, Lucille Ball, Charo, Joanne Woodward, Rita Hayworth, Dinah Shore, Rock Hudson, Cher, Martha Raye, Maggie Smith, Don Rickles, George Carlin, Gloria Swanson, Ella Fitzgerald, Joan Rivers, Rita Moreno, Tony Randall, Betty White, Phyllis Diller, Eddie Albert, Carol Channing, Betty Grable, Sid Caesar, Jonathan Winters, Jean Stapleton, Robert Goulet, William Conrad and Liza Minnelli.

Also, several notable character actors were used in the comedy sketches in featured roles, especially in the earlier seasons. Such actors include William Schallert, Isabel Sanford, Vivian Bonnell, Elaine Joyce, Brad Trumbull, and Reta Shaw. Lesser-known actors who appeared include Bob Duggan, Dick Patterson, and Inga Neilsen.

=== Opening ===
A favorite feature consisted of an unrehearsed question-and-answer segment with the audience in CBS Studio 33 lasting about three to four minutes at the start of most shows. Burnett stated that she borrowed the concept from Garry Moore, who did the same on his variety show, but never taped it. Burnett asked for the lights to be turned up ("Let's bump up the lights") and then randomly picked audience members who raised their hands. Burnett often ad-libbed funny answers, but occasionally ended up as the straight woman. For example:

Young woman: "Have you ever taken acting lessons?"
Carol: "Yes, I have."
Young woman: "Do you think it did any good?"

=== Rehearsals and ad-libs ===
The show was rehearsed each day until its two Friday tapings. Differently colored cue cards (black, blue, green, and red) were used for each major performer ("Carol Burnett: Bump-Up the Lights"). The second taping was fairly routine until Tim Conway came aboard as a guest star. As a recurring guest star from the show's launch and later a regular cast member, Conway inserted unrehearsed bits into sketches that became known to the staff as "Conway's Capers". Conway would play the first taping straight, but (if the sketch had played well in the first taping, and could be used) would ad-lib bizarre scenarios during the second. Some notable clips included Conway as a Nazi interrogator berating an American captive (Lyle Waggoner). Using a Hitler puppet and a pencil as a "club", Conway sang "I've Been Working on the Railroad" as Waggoner tried in vain to ignore him. Some, like the Hitler puppet, made it into the final broadcast; others, like a notably convoluted story about Siamese elephants joined at the trunk (ad-libbed during a 1977 "Mama's Family" sketch), were edited, the uncensored version only appearing years later on CBS specials. Conway's favorite victim was Harvey Korman, who often broke character reacting to Conway's zaniness, such as when Conway played a dentist misusing Novocaine or the recurring role of "The Oldest Man" – an elderly, shuffling, senile man who slowly rolled down stairs and fell prey to various mechanical mishaps (including an electric wheelchair and an automated dry-cleaning rack).

=== Ending ===
The show also became known for its closing theme song, written by Burnett's husband, Joe Hamilton, with these lyrics:

I'm so glad we had this time together
Just to have a laugh or sing a song
Seems we just get started and before you know it
Comes the time we have to say, "So long."

At the close of each episode, Burnett tugged her ear. This silent message was meant for her grandmother, who raised her, and meant she was thinking of her at that moment. After her grandmother's death, Burnett continued the tradition.

== Broadcast ==
When The Carol Burnett Show made its network debut on CBS-TV on September 11, 1967, it was scheduled on Mondays at 10:00 pm (EST) opposite NBC's I Spy and ABC's The Big Valley. At the end of its first season and through the spring of 1971, it consistently ranked among the top-30 programs. (For the 1969–70 season, it posted its highest rating ever, ranking at number 13.) For season five, CBS moved the show to Wednesdays at 8:00 pm (EST), where its chief competition was NBC's Adam-12 and the ABC sitcoms Bewitched and The Courtship of Eddie's Father. Despite the schedule change, the show continued to do well until the fall of 1972, when the ratings slipped. In December 1972, CBS again moved The Carol Burnett Show to Saturdays at 10:00 pm (EST) where, for the next four years, it not only received solid ratings, but was also part of a powerhouse Saturday-night lineup of primetime shows that included All in the Family, M*A*S*H, The Mary Tyler Moore Show, and The Bob Newhart Show.

In the 1973–74 season, the "Family" sketches (with Burnett as Eunice, Korman as her husband Ed, and Lawrence as Eunice's mother) were introduced and the "Carol and Sis" segments were phased out. At the end of that season (the series' seventh), after having been with The Carol Burnett Show from the beginning, Lyle Waggoner left the series to pursue other acting opportunities. The following season, Waggoner's spot as a supporting regular remained vacant. Don Crichton, the lead male dancer on the show, began to inherit some of Waggoner's duties. Then in season nine, because of his many popular guest appearances on the series, Tim Conway was signed as a full-time regular, joining Korman and Lawrence.

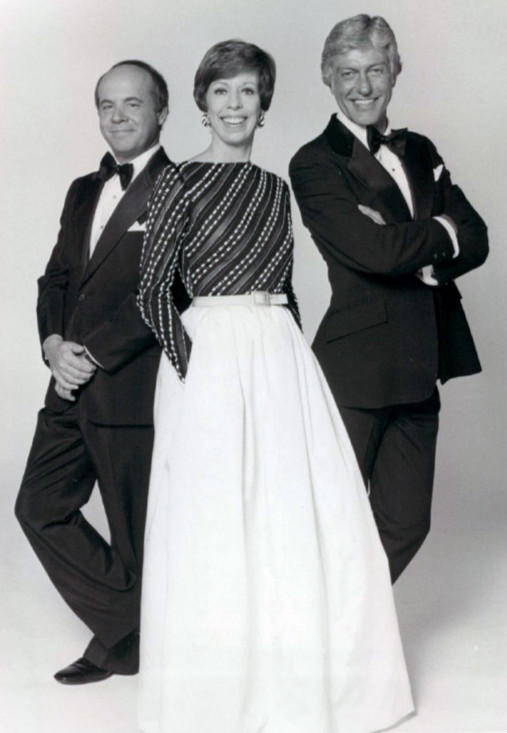
From left to right: Conway, Burnett, and Dick Van Dyke in the final season

In November 1976, the series' tenth year, The Carol Burnett Show presented what would become one of its best-known and most well-regarded sketches: "Went with the Wind!" a parody of the 1939 film Gone with the Wind, which had its television debut on NBC the week before. After the 1976–77 season ended, Harvey Korman decided to leave the series. After a decade of working with Burnett and winning several Emmy Awards, Korman had been offered a contract by ABC to headline his own series. Also, the ratings had begun to decline with the series ending its 10th season in 44th place as opposed to the previous year's Nielsen rating at No. 29. Nevertheless, CBS renewed Burnett's show for an 11th season.

Dick Van Dyke, fresh from headlining his own short-lived Emmy-winning variety series, Van Dyke & Company, was brought in to replace Korman. However, his presence did not help stem the sagging ratings, as the show faced new competition in ABC's The Love Boat. After three months, Van Dyke departed the show, and CBS, in a desperate attempt to save the series, moved The Carol Burnett Show from Saturdays at 10:00 pm (EST) to Sundays at the same hour, beginning in December 1977. Regular guest stars Steve Lawrence and Ken Berry were brought in to fill the void left by Korman and Van Dyke. The ratings improved considerably.

CBS wanted to renew the show for another year, but by this time, Burnett had grown tired of the weekly grind and wanted to explore acting roles outside of the comedy genre, despite her success in it. With the changes in cast along with the mediocre ratings, she felt that television was undergoing a transition and that the variety series format was on its way out. Therefore, Burnett decided to end the series on her own rather than be canceled later. Thus, on March 29, 1978, in a special two-hour finale entitled "A Special Evening with Carol Burnett", The Carol Burnett Show left primetime television after 11 years, finishing its last season in 66th place. Reruns were aired during the summer of 1978.

== Characters and sketches ==
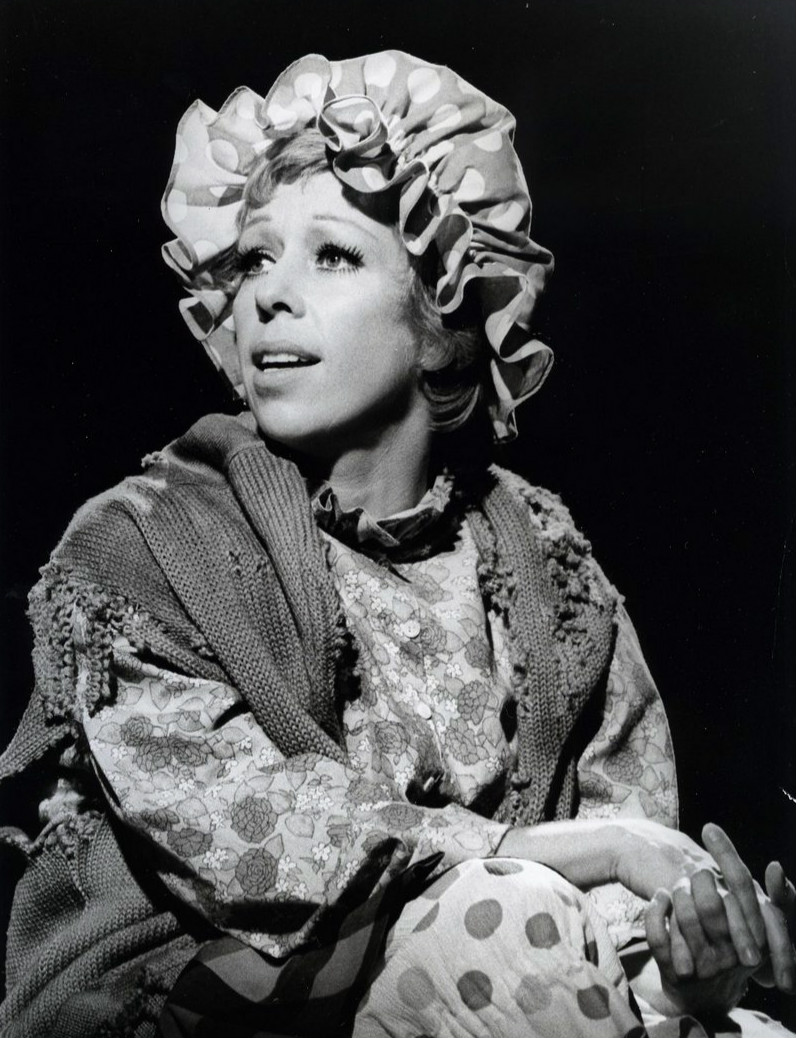
Burnett as the Charwoman

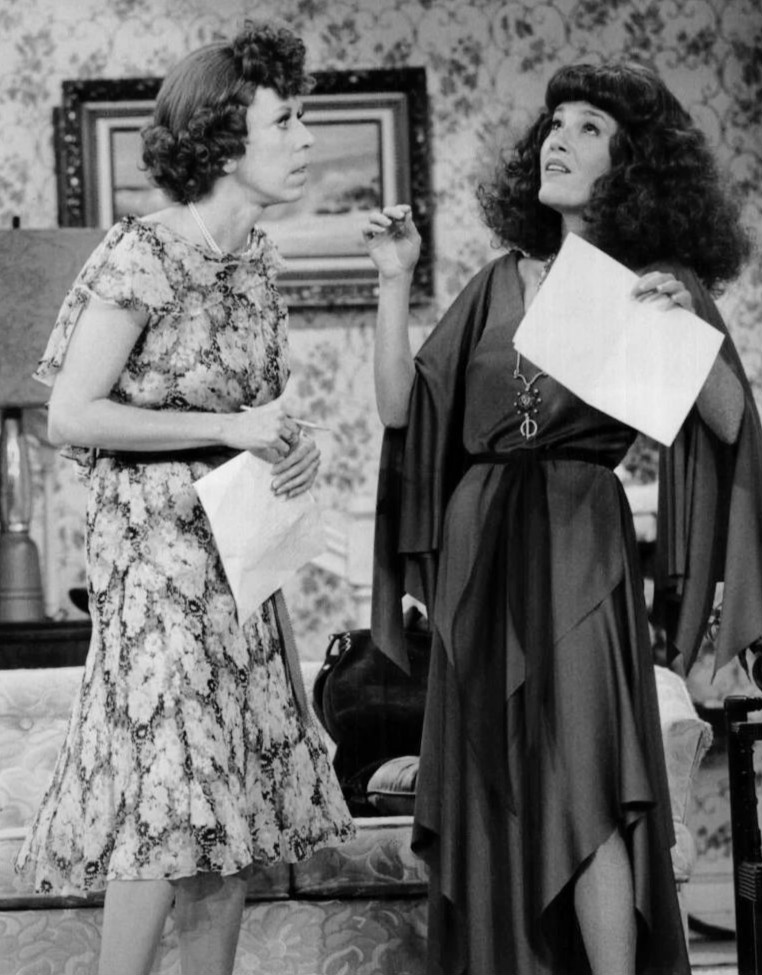
Burnett as Eunice with Madeline Kahn in "The Family" sketch

Some of the show's recurring characters and sketches include:

- As the Stomach Turns – a soap opera parody taking place in the fictional town of Canoga Falls with Burnett as the main character Marian Clayton
- Carol and Sis – Burnett as Carol and Vicki Lawrence as her sister Chris with Korman as Carol's husband Roger
- Charwoman – Burnett's signature character, an unnamed charwoman, most often in a musical number, whose animated image has been used in the opening credits, and also in the opening and closing credits of Carol Burnett and Friends
- The Family – Burnett and Korman as Eunice and Ed Higgins, a married couple, with Lawrence portraying Eunice's very difficult mother "Mama" Thelma Harper
- Nora Desmond – Burnett as a has-been silent film actress and Korman as her bald, dutiful butler Max in the take-off of the 1950 film Sunset Boulevard
- The Oldest Man – Conway as Duane Toddleberry, an old, slow-moving man, usually in various situations involving Korman being annoyed with his lack of speed
- V.I.P. – Harvey Korman as F. Lee Korman, who interviews famous "celebrities", parodied by Burnett, such as Julia Wild (Julia Child), Shirley Dimple (Shirley Temple) and Mae East (Mae West), as well as other guests such as a nudist
- Movie Parodies, spoofs of popular movies, most notably Went with the Wind!; others included Jowls, Mildred Fierce, The Lavender Pimpernel, Natural Velvet and more.
- Mrs. Wiggins – Conway as Mr. Tudball, a businessman who speaks in a mock Romanian accent, putting up with his empty-headed secretary Mrs. Wiggins, played by Burnett.
- The Queen, Burnett as a monarch patterned after Queen Elizabeth II, Harvey Korman as her consort and Tim Conway as Private Arthur Newberry.
- Commercial Parodies, spoofs of then-current television commercial spots.

== After the series ==
=== Continuations and revivals ===
In the fall of 1977, while the series was still running in prime time, the comedy sketches of the show were re-edited into freestanding programs; the resulting show enjoyed success for many years in syndicated reruns as Carol Burnett and Friends, a half-hour edition of selected 1972–77 material.

In the spring of 1979, a year after The Carol Burnett Show left the air, Burnett and her husband Joe Hamilton were dining in a restaurant with friends, including Tim Conway. At that gathering, Burnett got wistful and started reminiscing about the show and making suggestions to Conway concerning sketches that she wished they could be creating if the show were still running. Hamilton suggested to Burnett that she do a summer series. Taking that idea, Burnett and Hamilton approached CBS about doing a four-week program in the summer of 1979. CBS already had its schedule filled for the summer months and rejected the idea. However, ABC was interested, and as a result, four postscript episodes of The Carol Burnett Show were produced. Under the title Carol Burnett & Company, the show premiered on Saturday, August 18, 1979, and included many favorite sketches such as "Mr. Tudball and Mrs. Wiggins", "The Family", "As The Stomach Turns", and Burnett doing her impersonation of Queen Elizabeth II. Its format was very much similar to Burnett's series, with two exceptions. Due to the unavailability of Harvey Korman (who, ironically, had been under contract to ABC since he had left Burnett's show in 1977), comic actors Kenneth Mars and Craig Richard Nelson were added to the supporting cast, joining Lawrence and Conway. Ernie Flatt, who had been the choreographer on Burnett's show for its entire 11-year run, was replaced by the show's lead dancer Don Crichton. The guest stars in that four-week period were (chronologically) Cheryl Ladd, Alan Arkin, Penny Marshall, and Sally Field. The reviews of the series were very favorable, with several critics heartily welcoming Burnett back to weekly television, albeit on a limited basis. The ratings also were respectable and plans were announced for the program to become a yearly summer event, but it never happened.

In 1980, Joe Hamilton produced The Tim Conway Show, a variety series in the same vein with Conway as host and much of the staff of Carol Burnett & Company carrying over. Harvey Korman would join Conway as a co-host later in the show's short run; it ended in 1981.

The "Family" sketches led to a 1982 CBS made-for-television film called Eunice starring Burnett, Korman, Lawrence, Betty White, and Ken Berry. The success of this program spawned a spin-off sitcom titled Mama's Family, starring Vicki Lawrence and Ken Berry, which ran from 1983 to 1990. It occasionally featured Burnett and Korman guest-starring as Eunice and Ed Higgins; Burnett's involvement in Mama's Family was limited due to her divorce from producer Joe Hamilton. In the first year and a half of the show's run, Korman also appeared as narrator Alastair Quince, introducing each episode (a parody of Alastair Cooke hosting Masterpiece Theatre) and he also directed 31 episodes of the series.

NBC aired a comedy half-hour repertory series called Carol & Company that premiered in March 1990. It proved to be moderately successful in the ratings and was renewed for a second season. The regulars on the show included Peter Krause, Jeremy Piven, Terry Kiser, Meagen Fay, Anita Barone, and Richard Kind (and occasional guest stars, including Betty White and Burt Reynolds); each week's show was a different half-hour comedy play. This program lasted until July 1991.

CBS brought back The Carol Burnett Show for another run in the fall of 1991; new regulars included Meagen Fay and Richard Kind (brought over from the NBC show), and Chris Barnes, Roger Kabler, and Jessica Lundy. However, the times had changed and Burnett's humor was tame compared to the edgier comedy popular in the 1990s. The series failed to catch on with the public and only six episodes of this revival were aired.

In 1996, reruns of the syndicated Carol Burnett and Friends package aired on The Family Channel. It also aired on TV Land from 2004 to 2005. Beginning in January 2015, the show airs on MeTV at 11:00 PM ET.

The episodes of The Carol Burnett Show from 1967 to 1972 had never been released in syndication until 2019, when MeTV added the episodes to its library on April 14, 2019.

=== Specials ===
The cast of The Carol Burnett Show was reunited on four CBS television specials:

- The Carol Burnett Show: A Reunion (January 10, 1993) – featured several clips of the show's best moments from 1967 to 1978 with the gang reminiscing about their time together on the show.
  - 21.4 rating; 27.1 million viewers (9–11 pm)
- The Carol Burnett Show: Show Stoppers (November 26, 2001) – consisted mostly of bloopers and outtakes from the series.
  - November 26, 2001: 29.8 million viewers (time slot rank: first)
  - April 26, 2002: 11.5 million (time slot rank: first)
  - September 20, 2002: 6.2 million (time slot rank: third)
- The Carol Burnett Show: Let's Bump Up the Lights! (May 12, 2004) – featured showings of Burnett's recorded audience warmups (most of which made it, though not usually in full, to the aired episodes), during which she would turn up the house lights and provide often humorous — but sometimes serious — answers to questions shouted to her by members of the studio audience.
  - 13.6 million (time slot rank: second)
- The Carol Burnett Show: 50th Anniversary Special (December 3, 2017) – featured some of the most popular clips of comedy and music from the entire run of the show. Included dozens of celebrities, both live and recorded, to reminisce with Carol.
  - December 3, 2017: 1.5 18-49 rating; 15.2 million viewers (time slot rank: first)
  - December 27, 2017: 0.6 18-49 rating; 5.26 million viewers (time slot rank: fourth)

== List of guest stars ==
Note: only the first appearance by the guest star is listed.

=== Season 1 (1967–1968) ===
- Don Adams (1967-11-27)
- Eddie Albert (1967-09-25)
- Lucille Ball (1967-10-02)
- Ken Berry (1968-01-15)
- Sid Caesar (1967-09-18)
- Art Carney (1968-02-19)
- Diahann Carroll (1967-10-23)
- George Chakiris (1968-01-22)
- Richard Chamberlain (1967-11-13)
- Imogene Coca (1967-10-09)
- Tim Conway (1967-10-02)
- John Davidson (1967-12-11)
- Phyllis Diller (1967-10-16)
- Mike Douglas (1968-01-01)
- Barbara Eden (1967-12-04)
- Nanette Fabray (1967-11-06)
- Ella Fitzgerald (1967-12-25)
- John Gary (1968-02-26)
- Bobbie Gentry (1967-10-16)
- Frank Gorshin (1968-01-08)
- Betty Grable (1968-02-12)
- Jack Jones (1968-03-18)
- Shirley Jones (1968-01-22)
- Lainie Kazan (1967-10-09)
- Richard Kiley (1967-10-23)
- Durward Kirby (1968-02-26)
- Peter Lawford (1968-04-15)
- Gloria Loring (1967-10-02)
- Trini Lopez (1968-01-15)
- Barbara McNair (1968-05-06)
- Liza Minnelli (1967-09-18)
- Garry Moore (1968-02-26)
- Jim Nabors (1967-09-11)
- Leonard Nimoy (1967-12-04)
- Jack Palance (1968-02-05)
- Minnie Pearl (1968-04-15)
- Juliet Prowse (1967-11-20)
- Martha Raye (1967-11-20)
- Lynn Redgrave (1968-01-01)
- Mickey Rooney (1967-12-11)
- Soupy Sales (1968-03-25)
- The Smothers Brothers (1967-10-23)
- Sonny & Cher (1967-11-06)
- Mel Tormé (1968-03-04)
- Lana Turner (1968-01-08)
- Gwen Verdon (1967-10-16)
- Shani Wallis (1968-04-29)
- Lesley Ann Warren (1967-11-27)
- Dionne Warwick (1968-01-29)
- Jonathan Winters (1967-09-25)

=== Season 2 (1968–1969) ===
- Edie Adams (1968-10-21)
- Barbara Bain (1968-09-30)
- George Gobel (1968-10-14)
- Sergio Bustamante (1969-04-28)
- Vikki Carr (1969-03-31)
- Carol Channing (1968-09-30)
- Barrie Chase (1969-03-24)
- Perry Como (1969-01-20)
- Vic Damone (1968-12-09)
- Mike Douglas (1969-03-17)
- Vince Edwards (1969-02-03)
- Eileen Farrell (1968-12-16)
- George Gobel (1968-10-14)
- Robert Goulet (1969-04-07)
- Emmaline Henry (1968-12-30)
- Bob Hope (1968-12-16)
- Marilyn Horne (1968-12-16)
- Larry Hovis (1969-03-24)
- Martin Landau (1968-09-30)
- Michele Lee (1968-12-02)
- Ross Martin (1969-03-10)
- Ethel Merman (1969-03-03)
- Don Rickles (1968-11-11)
- Chita Rivera (1969-02-03)
- Jimmie Rodgers (1969-06-09)
- Mickey Rooney (1968-12-30)
- Isabel Sanford (1968-09-23)
- Ronnie Schell (1969-03-31)
- Mel Torme (1968-11-11)
- Flip Wilson (1968-12-02)
- Nancy Wilson (1968-11-04)
- Roland Winters (1968-12-30)

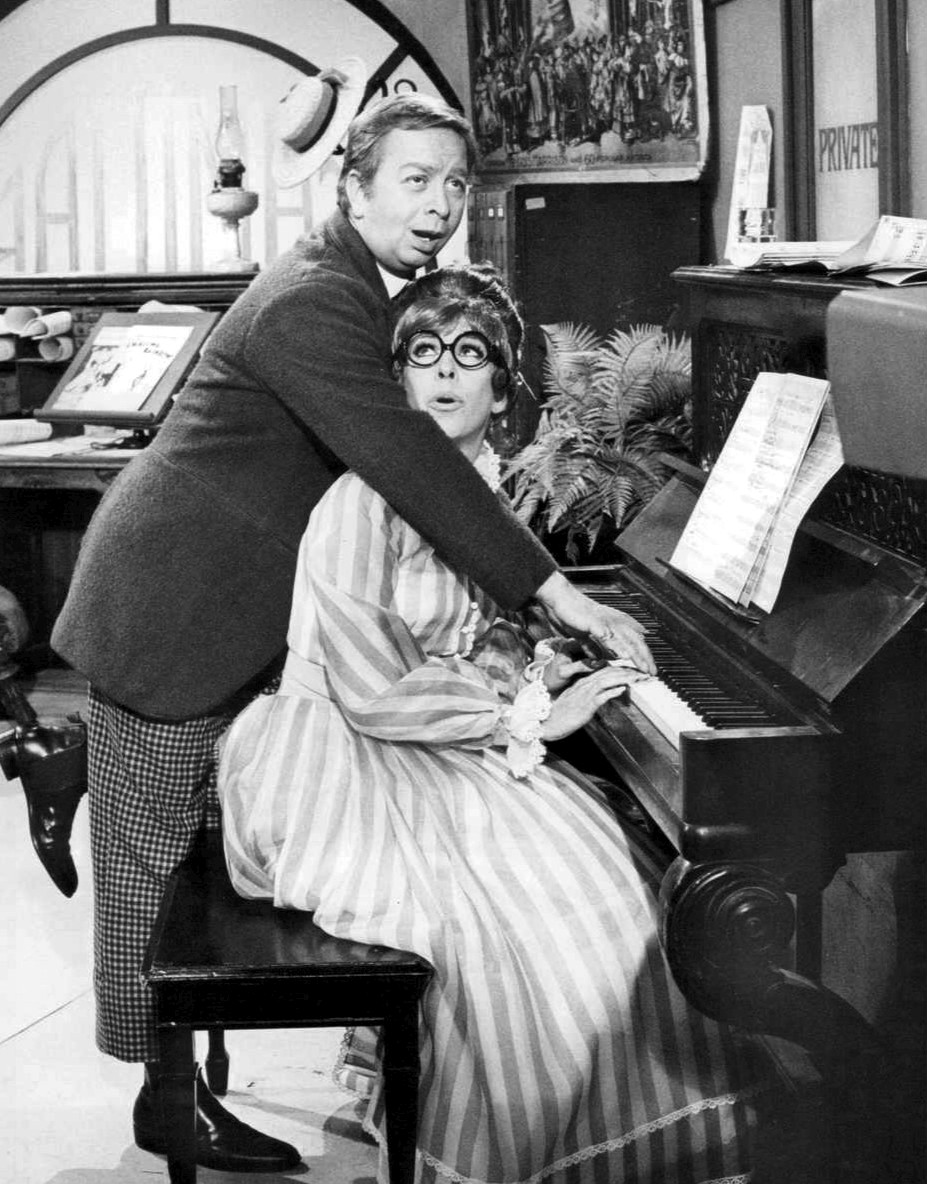
Skit with Mel Torme, 1969

=== Season 3 (1969–1970) ===
- Pat Boone (1969-11-03)
- George Carlin (1969-11-24)
- Pat Carroll (1970-02-23)
- Jane Connell (1970-03-02)
- Bing Crosby (1969-11-10)
- Barbara Feldon (1970-02-02)
- Merv Griffin (1969-11-17)
- Andy Griffith (1969-11-17)
- Jack Jones (1970-02-23)
- Steve Lawrence (1969-10-06)
- Peggy Lee (1970-03-30)
- Audrey Meadows (1970-01-05)
- Kay Medford (1969-10-20)
- Scoey Mitchell (1969-10-13)
- Donald O'Connor (1969-12-29)
- Bernadette Peters (1969-09-29)
- Ronald Reagan (1970-01-26)
- Joan Rivers (1970-02-02)
- Rowan & Martin
- Kaye Stevens (1970-01-05)
- Gwen Verdon (1969-11-03)
- Edward Villella (1969-10-06)

=== Season 4 (1970–1971) ===
- Jim Bailey (1971-02-01)
- Dyan Cannon (1970-11-23)
- Cass Elliot (1970-09-21)
- Totie Fields (1971-02-15)
- David Frost (1971-03-22)
- Eydie Gormé (1970-10-05)
- Rita Hayworth (1971-02-01)
- Jerry Lewis (1971-01-11)
- Michele Lee (1971-01-18)
- Mel Torme (1971-01-18)
- Rich Little (1970-12-28)
- Paul Lynde (1970-11-23)
- Ricardo Montalbán (1970-11-02)
- Bob Newhart (1971-02-22)
- Pat Paulsen (1970-09-21)
- Debbie Reynolds (1970-11-30)
- Leslie Uggams (1971-01-11)
- Violette Verdy (1971-01-25)
- Martha Raye (1970-11-15)
- Ross Martin (1970-11-15)

=== Season 5 (1971–1972) ===
- Kaye Ballard (1972-02-16)
- Karen Black (1972-03-22)
- The Carpenters (1971-09-22)
- Ray Charles (1972-01-26)
- Cass Elliot (1971-10-13)
- Dom DeLuise (1971-10-20)
- Diahann Carroll (1971-10-27)
- Shecky Greene (1971-11-24)
- Jack Klugman (1972-03-08)
- Vincent Price (1972-02-09)
- Tony Randall (1972-03-08)
- Burt Reynolds (1972-02-23)

=== Season 6 (1972–1973) ===
- Pearl Bailey (1972-10-25)
- Ruth Buzzi (1973-01-20)
- John Byner (1973-02-10)
- Jack Cassidy (1973-01-06)
- Petula Clark (1973-02-10)
- William Conrad (1973-03-17)
- Marty Feldman (1972-09-20)
- Jack Gilford (1972-10-11)
- Joel Grey (1972-10-18)
- Valerie Harper (1973-02-17)
- Paula Kelly (1973-03-10)
- Melba Moore (1972-11-29)
- Anthony Newley (1972-12-16)
- Helen Reddy (1972-09-27)
- Carl Reiner (1972-11-29)
- Paul Sand (1972-10-04)
- Stiller and Meara (1972-11-01)
- Lily Tomlin (1972-11-08)

=== Season 7 (1973–1974) ===
- Lucette Aldous (1973-12-08)
- Charo (1973-09-22)
- Richard Crenna (1973-12-15)
- The Jackson 5 (1974-03-16)
- Roddy McDowall (1974-03-16)
- Gloria Swanson (1973-09-29)
- Jack Weston (1973-10-20)

=== Season 8 (1974–1975) ===
- Alan Alda (1974-12-21)
- James Coco (1974-09-28)
- Buddy Ebsen (1975-03-08)
- Rock Hudson (1975-02-15)
- Janet Jackson (1975-01-25)
- Alan King (1974-11-02)
- Kenneth Mars (1974-11-09)
- The Pointer Sisters (1974-09-28)
- Wayne Rogers (1975-03-08)
- Telly Savalas (1974-10-12)
- Phil Silvers (1975-03-29)
- Maggie Smith (1974-11-23)
- Jean Stapleton (1975-03-29)
- Sally Struthers (1975-03-22)
- Nancy Walker (1975-02-15)
- Lena Zavaroni (1974-11-02)

=== Season 9 (1975–1976) ===
- Sammy Davis Jr. (1975-09-20)
- Emmett Kelly (1976-01-24)
- Shirley MacLaine (1975-10-04)
- Rita Moreno (1976-01-03)
- Dick Van Dyke (1976-02-21)
- Jessica Walter (1975-12-13)
- Betty White (1975-11-22)
- Joanne Woodward (1976-02-14)

=== Season 10 (1976–1977) ===
- Glen Campbell (1977-01-15)
- Madeline Kahn (1976-10-16)
- Hal Linden (1977-03-05)
- Neil Sedaka (1977-03-19)
- Dinah Shore (1976-11-13)
- Ben Vereen (1977-02-26)

=== Season 11 (1977–1978) ===
- Captain and Tennille (1978-01-28)
- Natalie Cole (1978-02-04)
- Nancy Dussault (1977-10-15)
- Steve Martin (1978-03-04)
- James Stewart (1978-03-29)

== Legacy ==
Considering her large body of work, and due in great part to this TV show, Burnett received Kennedy Center Honors in 2003, and was awarded the Mark Twain Prize for American Humor in October 2013.

In 2009, TV Guide ranked "Went with the Wind" number 53 on its list of the 100 Greatest Episodes.

On September 13, 2016, Burnett released her memoir about the show titled In Such Good Company: Eleven Years of Laughter, Mayhem, and Fun in the Sandbox. The book, full of anecdotes about the 1967–1978 variety series, covers the history of how Burnett created the show, how she cast her co-stars, the co-star she once fired (and quickly rehired), and all of the show's memorable characters. The audio format of the book, which she narrated, won a Grammy Award for Best Spoken Word Album.

== Home media ==
In the early 2000s, certain full-length episodes of The Carol Burnett Show were released on VHS and DVD by Columbia House on a subscription basis (now discontinued). Guthy-Renker released another DVD collection, The Carol Burnett Show Collector's Edition.

In August 2012, Time–Life released The Carol Burnett Show - The Ultimate Collection on DVD in Region 1. This 22-disc set features 50 episodes from the series, selected by Burnett. It also contains bonus features, including interviews with the cast, featurettes, sketches that were never aired, and a 24-page commemorative booklet.

In August 2015, Time–Life released The Carol Burnett Show - The Lost Episodes on DVD in Region 1. This 22-disc set features 45 episodes from the series' first five years (1967–72), selected by Burnett. It also contains bonus features, including interviews with the cast, featurettes, and a 24-page commemorative booklet. Previously, due to an ongoing legal battle with the production company Bob Banner Associates, the episodes from those seasons had never appeared in syndication nor been released on home media.

On April 27, 2020, Shout! Factory announced that all 11 seasons of The Carol Burnett Show would be available for viewing through their streaming channel beginning June 1, 2020, kicked off by a two-day marathon of episodes hand-picked by Burnett. The marathon would be available on Shout! Factory's website, streaming device channel, Twitch channel, and YouTube channel on May 30 and 31, 2020. This is the first time the complete series will be available on a streaming platform, although the episodes themselves are all edited down to 22 minutes, resulting in 30 minutes removed from each episode. These same episodes, edited-down from the original broadcast 52 minutes to 22 minutes, were subsequently carried by Amazon Prime Video.

== Repeat broadcasts ==
Half-hour edited episodes are broadcast on MeTV and full hour episodes on the Catchy Comedy channel.

== Nielsen ratings/broadcast schedule ==
Season	Rank	Rating	Time slot
1 (1967–68)	#27	20.1	Mondays at 10:00 pm
2 (1968–69)	#24	20.8	Mondays at 10:00 pm
3 (1969–70)	#13	22.1	Mondays at 10:00 pm
4 (1970–71)	#25	19.8	Mondays at 10:00 pm
5 (1971–72)	#23	21.2	Wednesdays at 8:00 pm
6 (1972–73)	#22	20.3	Wednesdays at 8:00 pm
7 (1973–74)	#27	20.1	Saturdays at 10:00 pm
8 (1974–75)	#29	20.4	Saturdays at 10:00 pm
9 (1975–76)	#29	20.5	Saturdays at 10:00 pm
10 (1976–77)	#44	18.9	Saturdays at 10:00 pm
11 (1977–78)	#66	16.4	Saturdays at 10:00 pm Sundays at 10:00 pm
12 (1991)			Fridays at 9:00 pm
