= Mrs. Wiggins =

Series of comedic sketches featured on The Carol Burnett Show

"Mrs. Wiggins" (also known as "Mr. Tudball and Mrs. Wiggins") is a series of comedy sketches featured on The Carol Burnett Show, with one installment airing on Carol Burnett & Company. The Carol Burnett Show introduced the skit series during its ninth season in 1975–76 and continued to air new installments for the remainder of its 11-season run, through its final season in 1977–78. However, the final installment of "Mrs. Wiggins" would not air until August 18, 1979 on a different four-week summer series titled Carol Burnett & Company. This was the only installment of "Mrs. Wiggins" that did not air on The Carol Burnett Show, which had completed its run almost a year and a half earlier on March 29, 1978. All together, there were 19 installments of "Mrs. Wiggins" sketches.

== Premise ==
"Mrs. Wiggins" features two characters created by Tim Conway: Mr. Bernie Tudball (played by Conway) and Mrs. Wanda Wiggins (played by Carol Burnett). Vicki Lawrence would occasionally play Mr. Tudball's wife. Mr. Tudball is a businessman with an off-color toupee and a mock Romanian accent, pronouncing his secretary's name "Mrs. Uh-Whiggins". Mrs. Wiggins is his secretary, a "bimbo who the IQ fairy never visited". She was notably recognized by how she walked in her skirt, as designed by Bob Mackie, and her near-constant fingernail filing and gum chewing. The sketches center on Mr. Tudball's frustration over Mrs. Wiggins' dimwittedness, such as not being able to properly use the office intercom system.

== Background ==
Tim Conway created the sketch after The Carol Burnett Show writers' office secretary, Charlene, would constantly press the wrong button on the intercom.

Mrs. Wiggins was originally written to be a little old lady, but Bob Mackie decided to go another route. He decided to base the look of Mrs. Wiggins on the kind of secretary that would sit around and file her nails and go to lunch. In the costuming of Mrs. Wiggins, Mackie put Burnett in a very tight skirt that would control the way she walked. He told Burnett to stick her behind in the bagging part in the back of the skirt, and this gave her the "Wiggins walk."

== Sketches ==
Nº	Season	Episode	Airdate	Title & Description
1	Season 9 (1975–1976)	Ep 17	January 10, 1976	The Intercom – Mr. Tudball has difficulty teaching Mrs. Wiggins how to use the office's new intercom system.
2	Season 9 (1975–1976)	Ep 21	February 14, 1976	The Intercom…Again – Mr. Tudball has even more difficulty teaching Mrs. Wiggins the workings of the office intercom.
3	Season 9 (1975–1976)	Ep 24	March 13, 1976	The Birthday Party – Mr. Tudball attempts to surprise Mrs. Wiggins on her birthday.
4	Season 10 (1976–1977)	Ep 4	October 16, 1976	The Vending Machine – Mr. Tudball does battle with a difficult coffee vending machine.
5	Season 10 (1976–1977)	Ep 7	October 30, 1976	Buzz Off – Mr. Tudball gets into trouble with a newly-installed door buzzer system, and Mrs. Wiggins is no help.
6	Season 10 (1976–1977)	Ep 10	November 27, 1976	Mr. Tudball tries to get Mrs. Wiggins to cover for him by lying to his wife.
7	Season 10 (1976–1977)	Ep 13	December 25, 1976	At Lunch – Mr. Tudball treats Mrs. Wiggins to a lunch in honor of National Secretary Week.
8	Season 10 (1976–1977)	Ep 17	January 29, 1977	Mrs. Wiggins' Lunch Date – Mrs. Wiggins has a lunch date with a millionaire suitor (Rock Hudson), but she wants to dump him.
9	Season 10 (1976–1977)	Ep 18	February 5, 1977	Enter Mrs. Tudball – Mr. Tudball is thrown out of the house by his wife for playing poker.
10	Season 10 (1976–1977)	Ep 19	February 12, 1977	The Vacation – Mr. Tudball teaches Mrs. Wiggins to play blackjack in preparation for her Las Vegas vacation.
11	Season 10 (1976–1977)	Ep 23	March 26, 1977	The Fire Drill – Mr. Tudball has a hard time coordinating a fire-safety plan with Mrs. Wiggins before an inspector arrives.
12	Season 11 (1977–1978)	Ep 4	October 15, 1977	Mrs. Wiggins' Pet Funeral – Mrs. Wiggins is overcome with grief at the funeral of her pet canary and Mr. Tudball offers to pay for the funeral but soon regrets it.
13	Season 11 (1977–1978)	Ep 6	October 29, 1977	Ol' Paint – Mr. Tudball tries to paint the office and relies on Mrs. Wiggins for help.
14	Season 11 (1977–1978)	Ep 9	November 19, 1977	Mrs. Wiggins in Hawaii – Mrs. Wiggins goes to Hawaii for a convention with Mr. and Mrs. Tudball.
15	Season 11 (1977–1978)	Ep 11	December 3, 1977	Mr. Tudball nudges Mrs. Wiggins to clean-up her desk which leads to office chaos.
16	Season 11 (1977–1978)	Ep 13	December 18, 1977	Christmas Eve – Mr. Tudball and Mrs. Wiggins enjoy a champagne-laden Christmas Eve.
17	Season 11 (1977–1978)	Ep 20	February 26, 1978	Car Problems – Mr. Tudball takes a telephone call from Mrs. Wiggins' car repairman, thinking it's her doctor.
18	Season 11 (1977–1978)	Ep 24	March 29, 1978	Flashbacks – Mr. Tudball is moving his office and has a flashback to the first time he interviewed Mrs. Wiggins.
19	Carol Burnett & Company	Ep 1.1	August 18, 1979	Mrs. Wiggins and the Energy Crisis – Mr. Tudball and Mrs. Wiggins make a mess of energy conservation.
