= Jenna McMahon =

American actress (1925–2015)

- McMahon in The Funny Side, 1971
- Born: Mary Virginia Skinner; May 24, 1925; Kansas City, Missouri, U.S.
- Died: March 2, 2015 (aged 89); Monterey, California, U.S.
- Occupations: Writer, producer, actress, comedian
- Years active: 1959–1993
- Spouse: James Holden (divorced)
- Children: 1 daughter, Kerry Holden-Dixon
- Awards: Emmy Award for Best Writing in Variety or Music for The Carol Burnett Show (1974, 1975, 1978)

Mary Virginia Skinner (May 24, 1925 – March 2, 2015), known professionally as Jenna McMahon, was an American writer, producer, actress and comedian. She was best known for her Emmy Award-winning work as a writer on the variety/sketch comedy program The Carol Burnett Show and for co-creating the television sitcoms It's a Living, The Facts of Life, and Mama's Family along with her writing partner Dick Clair.

== Early life ==
McMahon was born in Kansas City, Missouri. She later moved to New York City where she studied acting under Stella Adler. As an actress, she appeared on such television shows as Dennis the Menace, The Twilight Zone, Love, American Style, The Bob Newhart Show, and Welcome Back, Kotter.

== Television writing career ==
Relocating to West Hollywood, McMahon opened a playhouse and was teaching acting when she met Dick Clair in 1961. Using the name McMahon (her mother's maiden name), she and Clair formed a comedy act similar to that of Nichols and May, playing nightclubs and eventually appearing on The Ed Sullivan Show, The Merv Griffin Show and other television programs.

The duo moved into television writing in the early 1970s, working on episodes of sitcoms such as The Bob Newhart Show and The Mary Tyler Moore Show before joining the writing staff of The Carol Burnett Show in 1973. They remained with the show for six seasons, winning three Emmy Awards and receiving an additional six Emmy nominations in the process. The duo then moved on to write for Soap, for which they earned another Emmy nomination in 1981.

McMahon and Clair contributed the story for the final first-season episode of the NBC sitcom Diff'rent Strokes, which served as the springboard for their series The Facts of Life. The latter series ran for nine seasons on NBC, making it one of the longest-running sitcoms of the 1980s. McMahon and Clair then co-created It's a Living with Stu Silver; this series aired on ABC for two seasons and in first-run syndication for another four. In 1983, McMahon and Clair created Mama's Family, based on a recurring series of comedy sketches they wrote for The Carol Burnett Show called "The Family." McMahon and Clair also wrote for, and were producers on, the 1987 ABC comedy special Carol, Carl, Whoopi and Robin, for which Robin Williams won the first of his two Emmy Awards.

== Personal life ==
McMahon was married to actor James Holden, which ended in divorce. They have a daughter, Kerry Holden-Dixon.

== Later life ==
Following Clair's death in 1988, McMahon produced the short-lived sitcom Julie, starring Julie Andrews, before retiring from television. She died of heart failure in Monterey, California, on March 2, 2015, at age 89.
