= Craig Richard Nelson =

American actor (1947–2025)

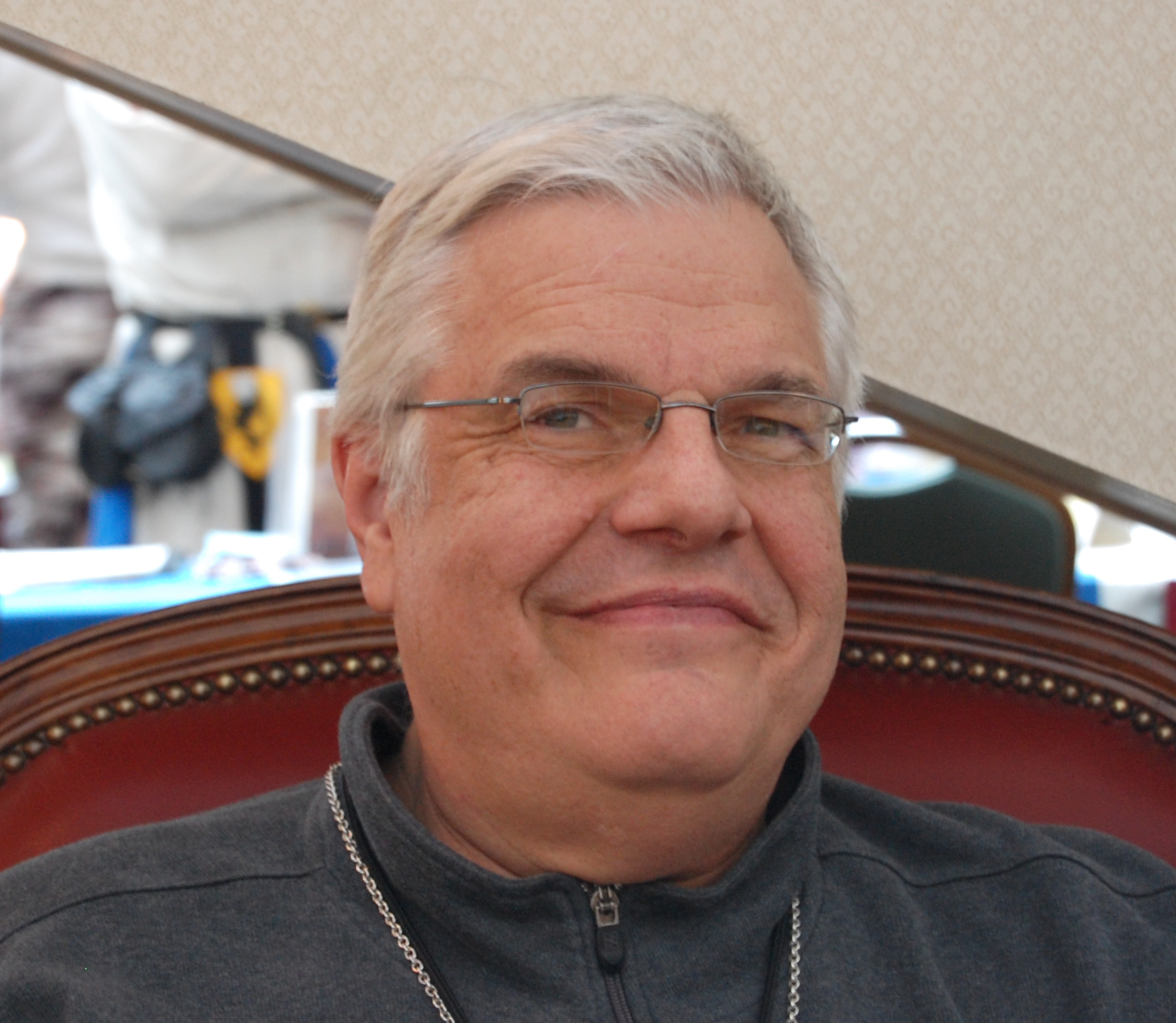
- Nelson in 2007
- Born: September 17, 1947; Salt Lake City, Utah, U.S.
- Died: March 3, 2025 (aged 77); Salt Lake City, Utah, U.S.
- Education: University of Utah (BA); New York University (MFA)
- Occupation: Actor
- Years active: 1973–1998

Craig Richard Nelson (September 17, 1947 – March 3, 2025) was an American actor in theater, film and television.

== Life and career ==
Nelson was born in Salt Lake City, Utah, and grew up as a member of the Church of Jesus Christ of Latter-day Saints. He studied acting at the University of Utah and New York University's Tisch School of the Arts. After graduation, he was cast in the Tony Award-winning Broadway musical Two Gentlemen of Verona.

A casting director saw him in that show and cast him in the film The Paper Chase as a mean-spirited law student. This led to a long career in film and television, including three Robert Altman films, A Wedding, 3 Women, and Quintet as well as a role in the coming-of-age comedy My Bodyguard. He also had a recurring role as drama teacher Mr. Spacek on the 1980s television show Square Pegs.

Nelson died in Salt Lake City, Utah on March 3, 2025, at the age of 77.

== Filmography ==
=== Film ===
- The Paper Chase (1973) – Bell
- 3 Women (1977) – Dr. Maas
- A Wedding (1978) – Reedley Roots
- Quintet (1979) – Redstone
- My Bodyguard (1980) – Griffith
- A Small Circle of Friends (1980) – Harry Norris
- Honey, I Shrunk the Kids (1989) – Professor Fredrickson (uncredited)
- Another You (1991) – Walt

=== Television ===
- Paul Sand in Friends and Lovers (1974) – Mason Woodruff
- Fernwood 2 Night (1977) – Dr. Richard Osgood
- Maude (1977) – Guest Star
- Stick Around (1977) – Earl
- The Grass is Always Greener over the Septic Tank (1978) – Hal Watson
- Barney Miller (1978) – Arnold Moraz
- Carol Burnett & Company (1979) – Regular
- Square Pegs (1982) – Mr. Spacek
- The Golden Girls (1986) – Mr. Thurber (1 episode)
- L.A. Law (1988) – U.S. Attorney Donald Kelly (uncredited)
- Dream On (1990) – Andre
- Star Trek: The Next Generation (1990) – Krag
- Alien Nation (1989) – Attorney
- Get a Life (1990) – Hastings
- Home Improvement (1991) – Bjorn
- Diagnosis: Murder (1993) – Dr. Thatcher
- Murder, She Wrote (1995) – Rob Hazlitt
- Star Trek: Voyager (1998) – Vaskan arbiter
