= Joe Hamilton (producer) =

American television producer and actor (1929–1991)

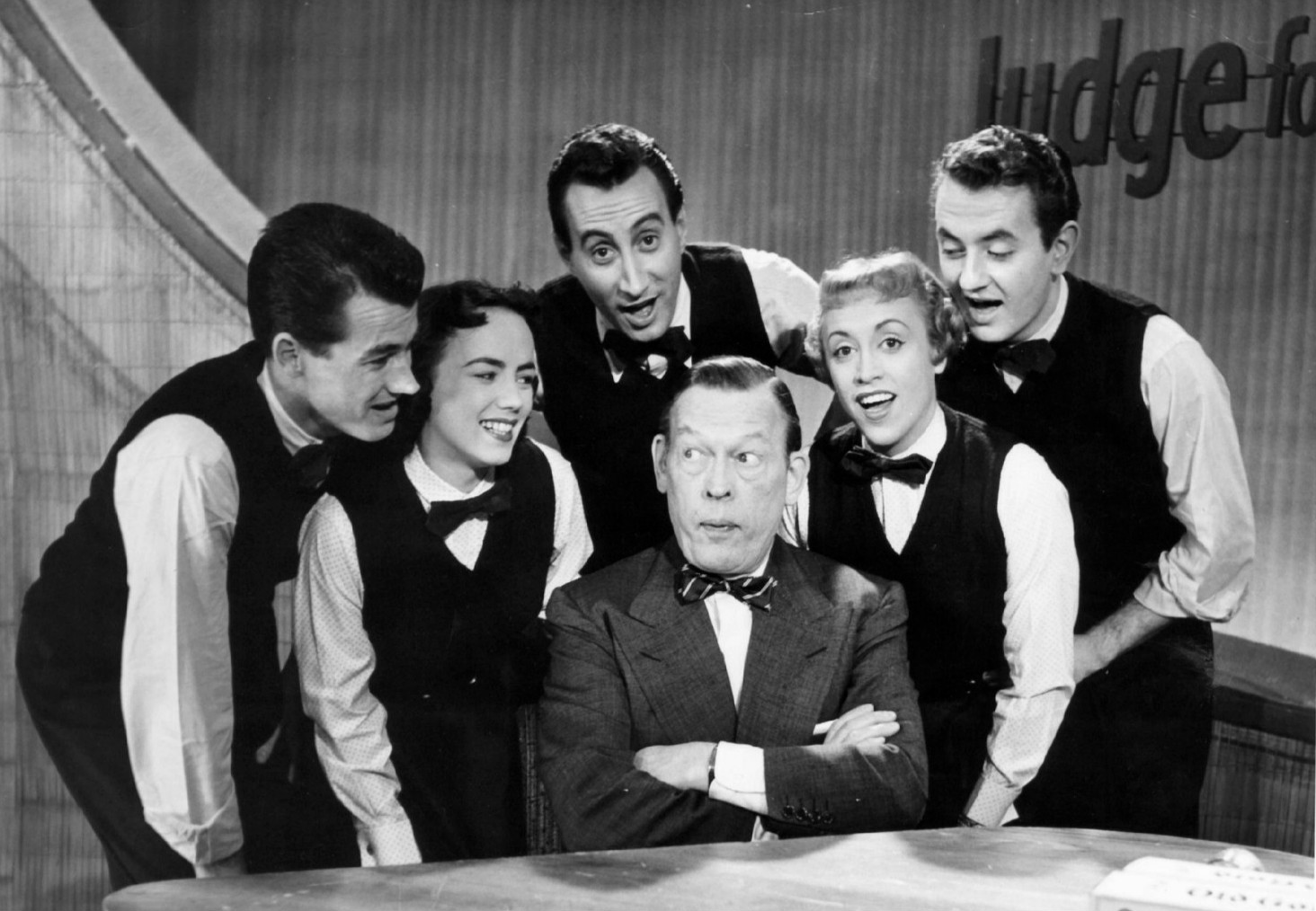
- Hamilton at left with Fred Allen as a member of The Skylarks in 1954, the group was part of the Judge for Yourself cast
- Born: Joseph Henry Hamilton Jr. January 6, 1929; Los Angeles, California, U.S.
- Died: June 9, 1991 (aged 62); Los Angeles, California, U.S.
- Spouses: Gloria Hartley (m. 1948; div. 1963) Carol Burnett (m. 1963; div. 1984) Sandy Troggio (m. 1991)
- Children: 11, including Carrie Hamilton and Erin Hamilton
- Relatives: Kipp Hamilton (sister)

Joseph Henry Hamilton Jr. (January 6, 1929 – June 9, 1991) was an American television producer and actor.

== Career ==
Hamilton began his career as a singer and composer with a vocal group, The Skylarks. With The Skylarks, he appeared on many early television programs, including Dinah Shore's. He became the producer of The Garry Moore Show in 1958, where actress Carol Burnett was a regular. He also appeared in two 1964 episodes of The New Phil Silvers Show.

Hamilton appeared in several episodes of The Andy Griffith Show as a bystander who made fun of Deputy Barney Fife (Don Knotts). He worked with Burnett on the short-lived CBS variety show The Entertainers and her long-running eponymous series The Carol Burnett Show, as executive producer and composer of its theme song. I'm So Glad We Had This Time Together. After Burnett's show concluded, he was executive producer of the 1982 Eunice TV movie. He also served as executive producer of The Tim Conway Show in 1980–81.

Hamilton was a catalyst behind the creation of Mama's Family. Despite the character of Thelma "Mama" Harper's death in the movie, the show centered around Mama, and ran for 30 episodes on NBC (from 1982 to 1984), and subsequently for 100 more episodes in the syndicated version, produced independently for Lorimar Telepictures (from 1986 to 1990). He made one brief appearance (albeit on a poster) on the show as Duke Reeves.

Hamilton won three Emmy Awards and had 14 nominations. He won the Outstanding Variety Series-Musical in 1972, the Outstanding Music-Variety Series in 1974, and the Outstanding Comedy-Variety Or Music Series in 1975, all three for The Carol Burnett Show.

== Personal life and death ==
Hamilton was the brother of television actress Kipp Hamilton.

Hamilton's first marriage was to Gloria Hartley on April 10, 1948. The marriage produced eight children. The couple divorced in 1963. His second marriage was to Carol Burnett on May 4, 1963. They had three children including Carrie Hamilton and Erin Hamilton before divorcing in 1984. His final marriage was to Sandy Troggio in 1991. He died on June 9, 1991.

== Actor ==
- Sea Hunt (1960) - Season 2, Episode 5
- "Alfred Hitchcock Presents" S3 E39 "Little White Frock" aired 6/28/1958
