= Dick Clair =

American actor (1931–1988)

- Born: Richard Jones; November 12, 1931; San Francisco, California, U.S.
- Died: December 12, 1988 (aged 57); Los Angeles, California, U.S.
- Resting place: Cryopreserved at Alcor Life Extension Foundation
- Years active: 1972–1987
- Awards: Emmy Award for Best Writing in Variety or Music for The Carol Burnett Show (1974, 1975, 1978)

Dick Clair (November 12, 1931 – December 12, 1988) was an American television producer, actor and television and film writer, best known for the television sitcoms It's a Living, The Facts of Life, and Mama's Family.

== Early life ==
Clair was born Richard Jones in San Francisco, California. He served in the military for two years from 1955 to 1957. He never married or had children.

== Career ==
In the early 1970s, Clair performed husband-and-wife comedy routines for The Ed Sullivan Show and The Dean Martin Show with his writing partner Jenna McMahon. Clair was a screenwriter for episodes of The Mary Tyler Moore Show and The Bob Newhart Show in addition to his Emmy Award-winning writing for the comedy-variety TV program The Carol Burnett Show. With Jenna McMahon, he wrote and produced the television sitcoms It's a Living, The Facts of Life, and Mama's Family.

== Cryonics involvement ==
Clair was active as an early member of the Cryonics Society of California in the 1960s. In 1982 he contributed $20,000 to the cryonics organization Trans Time so that a husband and wife could remain cryopreserved in liquid nitrogen. He was diagnosed with AIDS in 1986. When he was hospitalized in 1988, he faced opposition from the hospital and the State of California concerning his desire for cryonics treatment. The ensuing court battle (Roe v. Mitchell, with Clair as "John Roe") ended victoriously, establishing the legal right of persons to be cryonically preserved in the state of California.

== Death ==
Clair died on December 12, 1988, of multiple AIDS-related infections at the age of 57. He was cryopreserved at the Alcor Life Extension Foundation.
