= Tim Conway filmography =

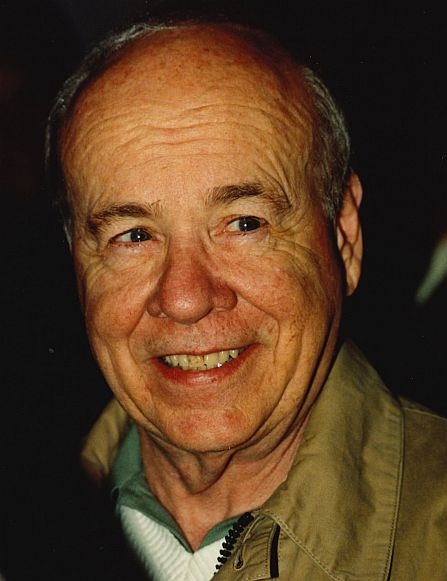
Tim Conway in 2002

The following is the complete filmography of American actor and comedian Tim Conway.

== Film ==
Year	Film	Role	Notes
1964	McHale's Navy	Ensign Charles Beaumont Parker	Based on the television series of the same name; Directed and produced by Edward Montagne
1965	McHale's Navy Joins the Air Force	Ensign Charles Beaumont Parker	Based on the television series of the same name; Directed and produced by Edward Montagne
1968	Star Spangled Salesman	Telephone Repairman	Short film directed by Norman Maurer; Produced by the United States Department of the Treasury to promote the sale of United States Savings Bonds
1973	The World's Greatest Athlete	Milo Jackson	Comedy film directed by Robert Scheerer
1975	The Apple Dumpling Gang	Amos Tucker	Comedy-western film directed by Norman Tokar
1976	Gus	Crankcase	Comedy film directed by Vincent McEveety
1976	The Shaggy D.A.	Tim	Comedy film and a sequel to The Shaggy Dog (1959) and directed by Robert Stevenson; Based on The Hound of Florence (German: Der Hund von Florenz) by Felix Salten and translated by Huntley Paterson
1977	The Billion Dollar Hobo	Vernon Praiseworthy	Comedy film directed and co-written by Stuart E. McGowan
1978	They Went That-A-Way & That-A-Way	Dewey	Slapstick/comedy film directed by Stuart E. McGowan & Edward Montagne and written by Conway
1979	The Apple Dumpling Gang Rides Again	Amos Tucker	Comedy-western film and sequel to The Apple Dumpling Gang (1975) directed by Vincent McEveety
1979	The Prize Fighter	Bags	Comedy film directed by Michael Preece and co-written by Conway
1980	The Private Eyes	Dr. Tart	Comedy-mystery film directed & co-produced by Lang Elliott and co-written by Conway
1984	Cannonball Run II	CHP Officer #1	Comedy film and sequel to The Cannonball Run directed by Hal Needham
1986	The Longshot	Dooley	Comedy film directed by Paul Bartel
1987	Dorf on Golf	Dorf	Comedy film directed by Roger Beatty and written by Conway
1988	Dorf's Golf Bible	Dorf	Comedy film directed by Roger Beatty and written by Conway
1988	Dorf and the First Games of Mount Olympus	Dorf	Comedy film directed by Lang Elliott and written by Conway
1990	Dorf Goes Auto Racing	Dorf	Comedy film directed by Barry Landon and written by Conway
1993	Dorf Goes Fishing	Dorf	Comedy film directed by Barry Landon and written by Conway
1996	Dorf on the Diamond	Dorf	Comedy film directed by Barry Landon and written by Conway
1996	Dear God	Herman Dooly	Comedy film directed by Garry Marshall
1997	Speed 2: Cruise Control	Mr. Kenter, Driving Instructor	Action-thriller film directed and produced by Jan de Bont
1998	Air Bud: Golden Receiver	Fred Davis	Sports-comedy film and sequel to Air Bud directed by Richard Martin; Also known as Air Bud 2
2000	The View from the Swing	Henry Whitaker	Comedy film directed by Paul Tuerpé
2001	Dorf Da Bingo King	Dorf	Comedy film directed by Jack Boeki
2006	Scooby-Doo! Pirates Ahoy!	Skip Jones	Voice, direct-to-video
2008	Garfield's Fun Fest	Freddy Frog / Gate Guard / Narrator	CGI film directed by Mark A.Z. Dippé and written & produced by Jim Davis; Sequel to Garfield Gets Real
2008	Legend of the Paddle: The Oldie Hollis Story	Oldie Hollis / Narrator / Derk Dorf	Short-comedy film directed by Raul Garcia & Pasquale Murena and written by Conway & Zack Zeiler
2009	Santa Buddies	Sniffer	Direct-to-DVD adventure-fantasy film directed, co-written, & co-produced by Robert Vince; Ninth film (eighth sequel) to the Air Bud series of films
2009	Rainbow Valley Heroes	Hank	Family film directed by Daniel E. Taylor
2011	Spooky Buddies	Sniffer	Direct-to-DVD Adventure-fantasy film directed, co-written, & co-produced by Robert Vince; Tenth film (ninth sequel) to the Air Bud series of films
2012	Treasure Buddies	Sniffer	Direct-to-DVD Adventure-fantasy film directed, co-written, & co-produced by Robert Vince; Eleventh film (tenth sequel) to the Air Bud series of films
2013	Super Buddies	Sniffer	Direct-to-DVD adventure-fantasy film directed, co-written, & co-produced by Robert Vince; Twelfth film (Eleventh sequel) to the Air Bud series of films
2013	Saving Santa	Santa Claus	Animated comedy film directed by Leon Joosen and Aaron Seelman
2014	Dawn of the Dragon Racers	Mulch	Animated short film directed by Elaine Bogan and John Sanford
2015	The SpongeBob Movie: Sponge Out of Water	Seagull	Comedy film directed by Paul Tibbitt; Based on SpongeBob SquarePants
2015	Chip & Bernie's Zomance	Professor VanVanguard	Horror film directed and written by Pasquale Murena
2016	Chip and Bernie Save Christmas with Dorf	Dorf	Comedy film directed and written by Pasquale Murena

== Television ==
Year	Title	Role	Notes
1960–1962	Ernie's Place	Various	WJW-TV Cleveland-area sketch comedy show
1962	The Garry Moore Show	Himself	1 episode
1962–1966	McHale's Navy	Ensign Charles Beaumont Parker	Contract role
1962–1976	The Mike Douglas Show	Himself	23 episodes
1963–2007	Big Chuck and Lil' John	Various	WJW-TV Cleveland-area sketch comedy show
1963	Shock Theater - Ghoulardi	Himself - Ghoulardi cohost	WJW-TV Cleveland-area Late Night horror show
1963	Channing	The Young Man	Episode: "A Doll's House with Pompoms and Trophies"
1966	The Red Skelton Show	Phil Fumble	Episode: "Gyp Off the Old Block"
1967	Rango	Rango	Contract role
1967–1978	The Carol Burnett Show	Various	Recurring (1967–75); Contract (1975–78)
1968	That's Life	Guest	Episodes: "Bachelor Days"; "Our First Baby"
1969	Turn-On	Guest Host	1 Episode
1970	The Tim Conway Show	Tim "Spud" Barrett	Contract role; Short-lived sitcom
1970	The Tim Conway Comedy Hour	Various	Contract role; Short-lived variety/sketch comedy
1970	The Merv Griffin Show	Himself	3 episodes
1970–1971	Rowan & Martin's Laugh-In	Guest	Recurring
1970–1971	Sesame Street	Himself	5 episodes
1972	Love Is... Barbara Eden	Himself	Television film
1973	The New Scooby-Doo Movies	Himself	Voice, episode: "The Spirit Spooked Sports Show"
1974	The Boys	Eddie Ryan	Television film
1974	ABC Afterschool Special	Janitor	Episode: "The Crazy Comedy Concert"
1974	Roll, Freddy, Roll!	Freddy Danton	Television film
1977	The Chevy Chase Show	Various	Television special directed by Art Fisher
1977	The John Davidson Christmas Special	Himself	Television special directed by Tony Charmoli
1977–1992	The Tonight Show Starring Johnny Carson	Himself	27 episodes
1979	Carol Burnett & Company	Various	Television specials and variety/sketch comedy
1980–1981	The Tim Conway Show	Various	Variety/sketch comedy
1983	Ace Crawford, Private Eye	Ace Crawford	Short-lived sitcom
1983	Great Day	Howard Simpson	Television film
1987	Faerie Tale Theatre	Mayoral Candidate	Episode: "Rip Van Winkle"
1990	Newhart	Himself	Episode: "Dick and Tim"
1990	Tim Conway's Funny America	Various	Short-lived hidden camera reality series
1991	Carol & Company	Audience Member	Episode: "That Little Extra Something"
1992	The Golden Palace	Milton	Episode: "Marriage on the Rocks, with a Twist"
1995	The Tonight Show with Jay Leno	Himself	Episode: "April 24, 1995"
1995–1996	Late Night with Conan O'Brien	Himself	2 episodes
1995–1996	Married... with Children	Ephraim Wanker	Recurring role
1996	Coach	Kenny Montague	Episode: "The Gardener"
1996	Cybill	Major Milo	Episode: "Going Out with a Bang"
1997	The Larry Sanders Show	Himself	Episode: "The Matchmaker"
1997	Coach	Kenny Montague	Episode: "The Body Gardener"
1997	Diagnosis: Murder	Tim Conrad	Episode: "Comedy Is Murder"
1997	The Simpsons	Himself	Voice, episode: "The Simpsons Spin-Off Showcase"
1997	Cosby	Happy Clock	Episode: "Hilton's Playland"; Billed as Special Guest Star
1997	Clueless	Mr. Hubley	Episode: "Shop 'Til You Drop"
1997	Touched by an Angel	Freddy	Episode: "The Comeback"
1997	Suddenly Susan	Mickey	Episode: "The Old and the Beautiful"
1997	The Drew Carey Show	Gus	Episode: "Volunteer"; Billed as Special Guest Star
1997	Hiller and Diller	Cliffy Dukay	Episode: "The Cliffy Dukay Show"
1998	Ellen	Comedian	Episode: "Ellen: A Hollywood Tribute, Part 1"
1998	Hercules	Griffin	Voice, episode: "Hercules and the Griffin"
1998	Clueless	Mr. Hubley	Episode: "Never P.E.T.A. Squirrel"
1998	7th Heaven	Rocky / Santa Claus	Episode: "Here Comes Santa Claus"
1998–2001	Biography	Himself	5 episodes
1999	Diagnosis: Murder	Tim Conrad	Episode: "The Roast"
1999	Mad About You	Clerk / Justice of Peace	Episodes : "The Final Frontier"
1999	O Christmas Tree	Squirrel	Voice, television special
1999	The Wild Thornberrys	Zebra #1 / Jackal	Voice, episode: "Have Yourself A Thornberry Little Christmas"
1999–2012	SpongeBob SquarePants	Barnacle Boy	Voice, recurring role
2001–2005	Yes, Dear	Tom Warner	Recurring role
2002	The Proud Family	Mr. Peterson	Voice, episode: "A Hero for Halloween"
2003	Hermie: A Common Caterpillar	Hermie	Voice, television film
2003	On the Spot	Mr. Henderson	Contract role; Short-lived sketch comedy show
2008	30 Rock	Bucky Bright	Episode: "Subway Hero"
2010	CSI: Crime Scene Investigation	Knuckles Pratt	Episode: "Take My Life, Please"
2010	Hot in Cleveland	Nick	Episode: "It's Not That Complicated"
2011	Batman: The Brave and the Bold	Weeper	Voice, episode: "Joker: The Vile and the Villainous!"
2011	Wizards of Waverly Place	Cragmont	Episode: "Justin's Back In"
2011–2012	WordGirl	Bampy Botsford	Voice, recurring role
2012	Pound Puppies	Wally Banks	Voice, episode: "The Fraud Princess"
2012–2014	DreamWorks Dragons	Mulch	Voice, recurring role
2013	Mike & Molly	Exhibitionist	Episode: "School Recital"
2013	Hot in Cleveland	Nick	Episode: "Canoga Falls"
2013	Major Crimes	Howard Gray	Episode: "There's No Place Like Home"
2014	Two and a Half Men	Tim	Episode: "Bite Me, Supreme Court"
2014	Glee	Marty Rogers	Episode: "Old Dog, New Tricks"
2014	Melissa & Joey	Rev. Matthews	Episode: "Don't Look Back in Anger"
2015	Surprised by Love	Granddad	Television film

== Video games ==
Year	Title	Role	Notes
2001	SpongeBob SquarePants: SuperSponge	Barnacle Boy	2D platform game developed by Climax Development and published by THQ; The game is based on the Nickelodeon cartoon series of the SpongeBob SquarePants; Released for PlayStation on November 5, 2001 and for Game Boy Advance on November 8, 2001; The Game Boy Advance version was also released on a Twin Pack cartridge bundled with SpongeBob SquarePants: Revenge of the Flying Dutchman
2002	Scooby-Doo! Night of 100 Frights	Professor Alexander Graham	Third person platform game with action elements that was developed by Heavy Iron Studios and published by THQ; Released for the PlayStation 2, GameCube, and Xbox consoles
2002	SpongeBob SquarePants: Employee of the Month	Barnacle Boy	Point-and-click adventure video game developed by AWE Games and published by THQ for the PC
2003	SpongeBob SquarePants: Battle for Bikini Bottom	Barnacle Boy	Based on the television show SpongeBob SquarePants, developed by Heavy Iron Studios, AWE Games, and Vicarious Visions, and published by THQ; Released for the PlayStation 2, Xbox, and GameCube consoles, as well as separate versions for Microsoft Windows and Game Boy Advance
2005	SpongeBob SquarePants: Lights, Camera, Pants!	Barnacle Boy	Based on the television show SpongeBob SquarePants, developed by THQ Studio Australia, WayForward Technologies, and AWE Games, and published by THQ; Released for the PlayStation 2, Xbox, and Nintendo GameCube consoles as well as separate versions for Microsoft Windows and Game Boy Advance; First SpongeBob SquarePants title to feature multiplayer mini-games, similar to the Mario Party video game series.
2009	SpongeBob's Truth or Square	Barnacle Boy	Based on the SpongeBob SquarePants episode with the same title, developed by Heavy Iron Studios, Barking Lizards Technologies, and Altron, and published by THQ; Released for the Wii, Nintendo DS, PlayStation Portable, and Xbox 360
2010	SpongeBob's Boating Bash	Barnacle Boy	Based on the television show SpongeBob SquarePants, developed by ImPulse Games and Firebrand Games, and published by THQ; Released for the Wii and Nintendo DS
2013	SpongeBob Moves In!	Barnacle Boy	Based on the television show SpongeBob SquarePants, developed by Kung Fu Factory, and published by Viacom International Inc.; Released for Android, iPhone, and iPad
2020	SpongeBob SquarePants: Battle for Bikini Bottom – Rehydrated	Barnacle Boy	Based on the television show SpongeBob SquarePants, developed by Purple Lamp Studios, and published by THQ Nordic; This game uses archival recordings of Tim Conway's voice that he provided as Barnacle Boy; This game marks Tim Conway's first posthumous role; Released for the Microsoft Windows, Nintendo Switch, PlayStation 4, Xbox One

== Video ==
Year	Title	Role	Notes
2004	Hermie & Friends: Flo the Lyin' Fly	Hermie	Animated short directed by Demetre Gionis and written by Troy Schmidt
2004	Hermie & Friends: Webster the Scaredy Spider	Hermie	Animated short directed by Demetre Gionis and written by Troy Schmidt
2004	Rainbow Valley Fire Department	Rusty the Firefighter	Animated short directed by Mark Page and written by Daniel E. Taylor
2005	Hermie & Friends: Buzby, the Misbehaving Bee	Hermie	Animated short directed by Bill Boyce & Gionis with the story by Max Lucado and written by Schmidt
2005	Hermie & Friends: A Fruitcake Christmas	Hermie	Animated short directed & co-written by Schmidt and co-written by Lucado
2006	Hermie & Friends: Stanley the Stinkbug Goes to Camp	Hermie	Animated short directed & co-written by Schmidt and co-written by Lucado
2006	Hermie & Friends: To Share or Nut to Share	Hermie	Animated short directed & written by Troy Schmidt
2007	Hermie & Friends: Milo the Mantis Who Wouldn't Pray	Hermie	Animated short directed by Rick Eldridge, written by Buddy Lewis & Schmidt, and story by Lucado
2007	Buzby and the Grumble Bees	Hermie	Animated short directed by Boyce and written by Lewis & Schmidt
2008	Hermie & Friends: Hermie and the High Seas	Hermie	Animated short directed by Boyce and written by Schmidt
2008	Huntin' Buddies	Game Warden	Short video directed by Wayne Berry and written by Tom Lester
2009	Skeeter and the Mystery of the Lost Mosquito Treasure	Hermie	Animated short directed by Boyce and written by Schmidt
2009	The Flo Show Creates a Buzz	Hermie	Animated short directed by Boyce and written by Schmidt
2010	Antonio Meets His Match	Hermie	Animated short directed by Boyce and written by Schmidt
2010	Hermie and Friends: Who's in Charge Anyway?	Hermie	Animated short directed and written by Ralph Boral
2011	Dorf and the Trial	Dorf	Short video directed by Pasquale Murena and written by Conway & Murena
2011	Dorf and the Tee Time	Dorf	Short video directed by Murena and written by Conway
2011	Dorf and the New Toga	Dorf	Short video directed by Murena and written by Conway
2011	Dorf and the Confession	Dorf	Short video directed by Murena and written by Conway & Murena
2011	Dorf and the Angry Fan	Dorf	Short video directed by Murena and written by Conway & Murena
