= As the Stomach Turns =

Comedy sketch series

"As the Stomach Turns" is a series of comedy sketches parodying the soap opera As the World Turns (or its title, at any rate) featured on The Carol Burnett Show, with one installment airing on Carol Burnett & Company. The sketch was created by show writers Kenny Solms and Gail Parent. The Carol Burnett Show introduced the series during its first season in 1967–68 and continued to air new installments for the remainder of its 11-season run, through its final season in 1977–78. The final installment of "As the Stomach Turns" did not air until September 8, 1979, on a different four-week summer series titled Carol Burnett & Company. This was the only installment of "As the Stomach Turns" that did not air on The Carol Burnett Show, which completed its run almost a year and a half earlier on March 29, 1978.

== Premise ==
The sketch's premise was to describe, in great detail, the problems of a woman in her 30s named Marian Clayton (played by Carol Burnett), who lived in the fictional town of Canoga Falls. The first installment aired on the 21st episode of the first season on February 12, 1968. As introduced by Lyle Waggoner, it was supposed to be the final episode of a 15-year long soap opera.

The sketch dealt with problems that were more likely to be seen on a soap opera than in real life, although many skits were inspired by popular television shows or movies. An example of the latter is a spoof of The Exorcist when Marian's niece Raven (played by guest Bernadette Peters) came to visit her and was possessed by a devil, Marian assumed, because Raven was such a nice girl normally. Otto Blackflag, the town exterminator, now styling himself as a freelance exorcist (played by Tim Conway and using the same mock Romanian accent that he would use to play the character Mr. Tudball) exorcised the demon from Raven's body. This same sort of plot was eventually done, in all seriousness, on Days of Our Lives decades later.

Another movie parody saw Marian meet the bedraggled "Richard Dryface," played by guest Steve Martin in a spoof of Close Encounters of the Third Kind, complete with a grey, bulbous-headed alien played by Conway.

The sketch also touched on stereotypical aspects of production values in American soaps. Many times, Marian forgot what she wanted to say, reminiscent of the times when soap operas were broadcast live and actors routinely forgot their next line. The "soap's sound effects people" would frequently either miss their cues to ring Marian's doorbell or telephone, or they would ring them too soon, leaving "the actress playing Marian" high and dry to the point that, after multiple times of trying to hint that she was waiting for a sound effect and getting complete silence, she was forced to answer her door or the phone before they rang (after which the sound effect would finally be heard––at the completely wrong time) in order to keep the plot moving. On live soap opera productions, these were big problems; due to the live nature of the show, they happened fairly frequently and were subsequently spoofed at length on The Carol Burnett Show.

In addition to the missed cues, the sketch was notorious for overusing loud and plangent organ music, a reference to a time when soap operas would have in-house organists play dramatic music as well as the show's theme song (when this skit first ran, organ music was still in wide use on the serials). Organ music was eventually discontinued in the mid-1970s, around the time The Carol Burnett Show wrapped up its run, so when the sketch is seen in syndication today, it brings back a sense of production technique that is now seen by many younger soap viewers as archaic and outdated.

One of the sketch's recurring characters is Marian's "ne'er-do-well" daughter (played by Vicki Lawrence) who arrives at the door holding a baby (a doll), usually says "Don't you recognize me mother? I'm your daughter," then leaves after giving the baby to Marian who immediately stashes it in the umbrella stand. This was a parody of the fact that traditional soap operas have little use for child characters, either dropping them from the plot line shortly after they are introduced or unnaturally aging them into adulthood or, more recently, into the teenage years (for example, a young character might be sent upstairs to put on his or her shoes and never be referred to again).

The sketch also marks the first appearances of Harvey Korman's Mother Marcus character, who had also become a recurring resident of Canoga Falls, as well as Tim Conway's Oldest Man character, who within the confines of the series, played several characters, including Marian's grandfather, her Uncle Waldo, insurance agent Duane Toddleberry, and obscene phone caller Marvin Peterson Jr.

The sketch was famous for the parody ending in which the announcer would ask foreboding, progressively nonsensical questions about the characters while focusing on their puzzled reactions.

== Trivia ==
- In her 1996 memoir, As My World Still Turns, actress Eileen Fulton, who has starred on the CBS soap As the World Turns for over four decades, claimed credit for coming up with the concept for "As the Stomach Turns". Fulton stated that when she was contacted to be a guest star on The Carol Burnett Show, she suggested a parody of a soap called "As the Stomach Turns". Ultimately Fulton ended up not appearing on the show, but the "Stomach Turns" sketch did.
- Cher appeared on an episode of "As the Stomach Turns" as Pocahontas Pirelli, "the town half-breed: half-Indian, and half-dressed," which was a play on her hit song of the time, "Half-Breed." She came in wearing a Native American headdress and a bikini top.
- In an early sketch, Carol Burnett opens the door to find Harvey Korman as Mother Marcus for the character's first appearance on the show. When rehearsing the sketch, Korman never appeared in costume but spoke in the voice. When Burnett opened the door in dress rehearsal it was the first time she had actually seen him dressed up as the character. Burnett's reaction (pausing, struggling to regain her composure before slamming the door in his face, then cracking up when she opened the door again (with Harvey holding Mother Marcus' chest that had been "hit by the door") to move the script along) was completely genuine.
- In addition to Mother Marcus, several other characters who appeared at the door and had it slammed in their faces also held their noses or foreheads when the door reopened.
- In Hot in Cleveland, season 4, episode 14, Canoga Falls is revealed to be Victoria Chase’s hometown. Carol Burnett guest star as Victoria’s mother, who Victoria (Wendie Malick) hasn’t visited in twelve years. The episode reunites Carol Burnett with Betty White, who often guest starred on Carol Burnett’s variety show and was in the last installment of “As the Stomach Turns” on The Carol Burnett Show.

== Sketches ==
| Nº | Season | Episode | Airdate | Title & Description | Guest stars |
|---|---|---|---|---|---|
| 1 | Season 1 (1967–1968) | Ep 22 | February 12, 1968 | Marian's friend Victoria's long lost son is found after 15 years. | Martha Raye, Betty Grable |
| 2 | Season 2 (1968–1969) | Ep 3 | October 7, 1968 | Marian tells her friend Ruth they are sisters, and Ruth has six months to live as she is dying from malaria. | Nanette Fabray |
| 3 | Season 2 (1968–1969) | Ep 6 | November 4, 1968 | Marian and her widow friend Laura Peterson come back from a funeral. | Lucille Ball, Eddie Albert, Nancy Wilson |
| 4 | Season 2 (1968–1969) | Ep 19 | February 17, 1969 | Marian's friend Elise wants to kill her. | Shirley Jones, Ken Berry |
| 5 | Season 3 (1969–1970) | Ep 5 | October 20, 1969 | Marian is planning on sending her grandfather away to Sun City. | Tim Conway, Ken Berry |
| 6 | Season 3 (1969–1970) | Ep 6 | November 3, 1969 | Marian's brother Teddy comes for a visit and announces he's engaged to Miss Lily, the "town naughty lady". | Gwen Verdon, Pat Boone |
| 7 | Season 3 (1969–1970) | Ep 15 | January 5, 1970 | Marion's friend Muriel wants to kill herself. | Audrey Meadows |
| 8 | Season 3 (1969–1970) | Ep 20 | February 23, 1970 | A housewife with a weight problem seeks advice from Marian and her divorce lawyer. | Pat Carroll |
| 9 | Season 3 (1969–1970) | Ep 22 | March 9, 1970 | Marion fears her friend is an alcoholic and calls the doctor. | Nanette Fabray |
| 10 | Season 3 (1969–1970) | Ep 26 | April 13, 1970 | Marian's friend Selma is hooked on tranquilizers and pep-up pills. | Nanette Fabray, Michele Lee |
| 11 | Season 4 (1970–1971) | Ep 3 | September 28, 1970 | Marian's friend Joyce announces she's a kleptomaniac. | Nanette Fabray, Nancy Wilson |
| 12 | Season 4 (1970–1971) | Ep 11 | November 23, 1970 | Marian's rich friend Louise and the Canoga Twins come over for a visit. | Dyan Cannon, Paul Lynde |
| 13 | Season 4 (1970–1971) | Ep 15 | December 28, 1970 | Marian is visited by the Kissing Bandit of Canoga Falls. | Robert Goulet, Pat Carroll |
| 14 | Season 4 (1970–1971) | Ep 16 | January 4, 1971 | Marian's friend Renée is a women's libber and a pro football scout has his eye on her. | Art Carney, Pat Carroll |
| 15 | Season 4 (1970–1971) | Ep 21 | February 15, 1971 | Marian's friend Estelle announces she's a werewolf. | Totie Fields |
| 16 | Season 4 (1970–1971) | Ep 26 | March 29, 1971 | Marian tells her friend Renée that she is broke and Felix Murdock the banker comes to foreclose on her house. | Nanette Fabray, Paul Lynde |
| 17 | Season 5 (1971–1972) | Ep 3 | October 6, 1971 | Marian's friend Jinx Vandenberg suffers from bad luck. | Carol Channing, Steve Lawrence |
| 18 | Season 5 (1971–1972) | Ep 9 | November 3, 1971 | Marian's visitors are town masochist Mel Torment and Mother Marcus. | Bing Crosby, Paul Lynde |
| 19 | Season 5 (1971–1972) | Ep 10 | November 10, 1971 | Marian's modelling friend Suzie Shrimpton comes back to Canoga Falls. | Bernadette Peters, Cass Elliot |
| 20 | Season 5 (1971–1972) | Ep 14 | December 29, 1971 | Marian speaks with Madame Natasha, a soothsayer who forecasts several over-the-top guests arriving at her front door. | Vivian Bonnell, Dick Martin, Steve Lawrence |
| 21 | Season 5 (1971–1972) | Ep 21 | February 16, 1972 | Marian is in the hospital recovering from an accident. | Kaye Ballard, Steve Lawrence |
| 22 | Season 6 (1972–1973) | Ep 8 | November 1, 1972 | Marian goes to the circus. | Jerry Stiller, Anne Meara |
| 23 | Season 6 (1972–1973) | Ep 20 | February 17, 1973 | Marian's friend David is deathly afraid of women. | Valerie Harper, Tim Conway |
| 24 | Season 7 (1973–1974) | Ep 9 | November 10, 1973 | While desperately seeking a problem, Marian meets her long-lost twin sister. | Petula Clark, Tim Conway |
| 25 | Season 7 (1973–1974) | Ep 19 | February 16, 1974 | Marian's niece Raven is possessed by the devil. | Bernadette Peters, Tim Conway |
| 26 | Season 8 (1974–1975) | Ep 11 | December 7, 1974 | Don Provolone comes to blackmail Marian. | Steve Lawrence |
| 27 | Season 9 (1975–1976) | Ep 3 | September 27, 1975 | Pocahontas Perrelli visits and Canoga Falls has a new hairdresser, Warren Pretty. | Cher |
| 28 | Season 10 (1976–1977) | Ep 20 | February 26, 1977 | Marian comes back from her daughter Jamie's funeral, only to realize that she's not dead but bionic. | N/A |
| 29 | Season 11 (1977–1978) | Ep 21 | March 5, 1978 | Marian's daughter comes back to Canoga Falls with an alien. | Steve Martin, Betty White |
| 30 | Carol Burnett & Company | Ep 1.4 | September 8, 1979 | Marian is visited by Pamela, a former Miss America pageant winner who refuses to give up her crown. | Sally Field |
