= Joan Benedict Steiger =

American actress (1927–2024)

- Born: Joan Benedict; July 21, 1927; Brooklyn, New York, U.S.
- Died: June 24, 2024 (aged 96); Los Angeles, California, U.S.
- Resting place: Forest Lawn Memorial Park, Hollywood Hills, California, U.S.
- Spouses: John Myhers (m. 1962; died 1992); Rod Steiger (m. 2000; died 2002)
- Partner: Jeremy Slate (2002–2006; his death)
- Children: 1

Joan Benedict Steiger (July 21, 1927 – June 24, 2024) was an American actress best known for her role as Edith Fairchild on General Hospital.

== Early life and education ==
Benedict Steiger was born in Brooklyn, New York, and first performed at the age of seven at the Brooklyn Academy of Music. She continued her training at Rome Opera Ballet School, before studying with acting coaches Robert Lewis and Stella Adler, founders of the Actors Studio in New York.

== Career ==
=== Theatre ===
Her list of stage credits include acclaimed productions of contemporary offerings such as Promises, Promises, The Beauty Queen of Leenane, Collected Stories by Donald Margulies, P.J. Barry's The Octette Bridge Club, Horton Foote's The Traveling Lady, and Morris West's The World is Made of Glass, opposite Don Knotts in the comedy The Mind with the Dirty Man, and others.

=== Film ===
Benedict Steiger is known for a classic bit from the original version of Candid Camera, where she played a lost tourist looking for directions from passersby. She was also part of the ensemble of the original Steve Allen Show, where she did double duty as the spokesperson for Hazel Bishop cosmetics. On daytime drama, she had regular and recurring roles on General Hospital, Days of Our Lives, and Capitol. She has a starring role the 2011 feature Dead Border.

== Personal life ==
Joan Benedict Steiger's personal relationships were the basis for her one-woman show, The Loves of my Life. Her first marriage was to actor John Myhers, best known for his work in How to Succeed in Business Without Really Trying, and they were married from 1962 until Myhers' death in 1992. Benedict Steiger is also the widow of the Academy Award-winning actor Rod Steiger, whom she married on October 10, 2000. They appeared in two films together, A Month of Sundays and the telefilm The Flying Dutchman. Following Rod Steiger's death in 2002, Benedict Steiger's partner was actor Jeremy Slate, a veteran of over 80 films and television shows dating back to 1959, until his death in 2006.

Steiger lived in Malibu, California for many years. She died from complications of a stroke at the Cedars-Sinai Medical Center in Los Angeles, on June 24, 2024. She was 96.

== Filmography ==
=== Film ===
Year	Title	Role	Notes
1965	Saturday Night in Apple Valley	Poopsie Patata	
1977	The Happy Hooker Goes to Washington	Sally	
1979	The Prize Fighter	Dori	
1988	Perfect Victims	Receptionist	
2001	A Month of Sundays	Dr. Stanz	
2004	Sweet Underground	Martha	
2006	The Theory of Everything	Judge	
2013	Dead Border	Dr. Charlotte Barnes	
2017	Opus of an Angel	Bird Lady	

=== Television ===
Year	Title	Role	Notes
1971	The Smith Family	Marge	Episode: "Greener Pastures"
1974	Apple's Way	Mr. Knowles	Episode: "The Pen Pal"
1980	The Incredible Hulk	Society Woman	Episode: "Falling Angels"
1981, 1982	Fantasy Island	Announcer / Matron	2 episodes
1984	T. J. Hooker	Mary	Episode: "Model for Murder"
1985	Berrenger's	Rue McDaniels	Episode: "For Gloria's Benefit"
1985	Crazy Like a Fox	M. C.	Episode: "Fox in 3/4 Time"
1985	Hunter	Jewelry Customer	Episode: "Waiting for Mr. Wrong"
1986	Hotel	Mrs. Adams	Episode: "Changes of Heart"
1986	Days of Our Lives	Real Estate Agent	Episode #1.5318
1986	The New Gidget	Matron	Episode: "Super Gidget"
1992	The Trials of Rosie O'Neill	Wife	Episode: "Heartbreak Hotel"
2001	The Flying Dutchman	Moira	Television film
2009	Dollhouse	Old Lady	Episode: "A Spy in the House of Love"
