= The Oldest Man =

Recurring character from comedy sketches on The Carol Burnett Show

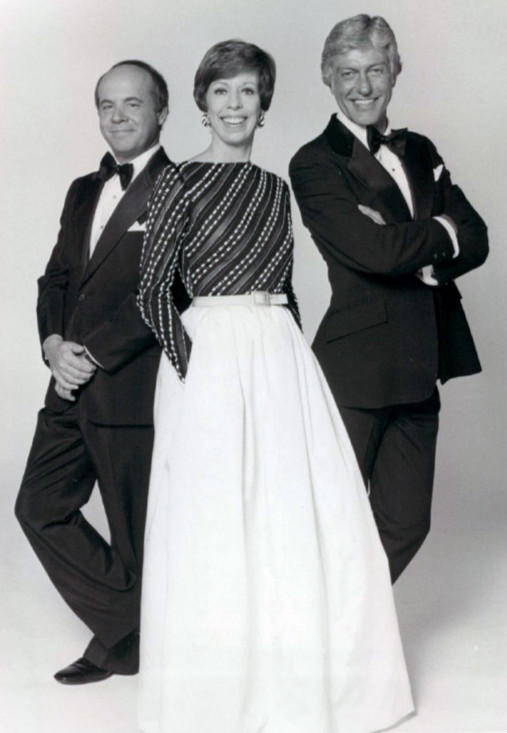
Tim Conway, Carol Burnett, Dick Van Dyke (1977)

The Oldest Man, sometimes referred to as Duane Toddleberry, is a recurring character from comedy sketches featured on The Carol Burnett Show. The character was created by Tim Conway during his run on the show and is noted for Conway's performance of slapstick and ad-libbed humor. The character was revisited in Conway's live comedy tour with fellow actor Harvey Korman from 2003 until Korman's death in 2008, twice on The Queen Latifah Show between 2014 and 2015, in a sketch in the Motion Picture & Television Fund, and also in the collector's edition DVD titled Together Again, which includes new sketches starring Tim Conway and Harvey Korman in their classic roles from The Carol Burnett Show.

Throughout his career, Conway earned five Emmy Awards for his work on the show, and in 2002, he was inducted into the Television Hall of Fame.

Conway cites "The Fireman" as among his favorite sketches he's ever performed. In addition, Carol Burnett included one of "The Oldest Man" sketches - "Galley Slaves" - in her list of All-Time Favorite Sketches from The Carol Burnett Show.

== Description ==
The Oldest Man is known for his signature shuffle, created by his absurdly slow movements. As the Oldest Man, Tim Conway wears a rumpled white wig, typically along with a suit, and speaks in a slurred, droning voice. The character was created by Conway, who began as a recurring guest on The Carol Burnett Show before becoming a series regular beginning with the 1975–1976 season.

The Oldest Man appears in a variety of situations, performing a new type of role in each sketch. Some of the most notable including a slave in a galley ship, a fireman, a clock-maker, a butcher, and a shoe store salesman. Most often, the character plays opposite straight man Harvey Korman, who reacts with frustration and anger to The Oldest Man's lingering pace and unhelpful charades.

The Oldest Man is a strong example of slapstick comedy and clown acting, as the character typically performs exaggerated physical stunts and often injures himself comically in the process. For example, playing the grandfather character to Marion, Conway takes a drastically slow tumble down the stairs in one "As the Stomach Turns" sketch, aired October 20, 1969, or in The Oldest Torturer sketch, aired December 6, 1975, he slowly burns himself with a hot iron.

== Origins ==
Conway remarks that the idea for the Oldest Man character began with memories from earlier in life: “I broke my back in high school,” Conway says, “and walking to and from school that was my speed. That was the way I walked. So that got a lot of laughs.” Later, when working on The Carol Burnett Show, Conway claims the idea for the shuffling walk arrived spontaneously during one sketch. “Carol (Burnett) opened the door and I was supposed to walk to the couch and then I was going to talk to her but I was supposed to be this old man. I started walking that way and as I was walking across the room I said to myself, ‘You know, if they don’t stop this the sketch is going to be about three days long.’ But nobody stopped me, we kept going, and that started that character.”

Conway says the spontaneity of the Oldest Man’s creation served as a way to make fellow actor Korman laugh. “A lot of the characters were created on air... Harvey would fall apart because the first time they saw the old man and the way I walked as the old man was when we were actually taping the show. So, when I started walking from the door and shuffling across the room as the rug was gathering in front of me (laughs), that was the first time that anybody had seen it.”

In regards to the Oldest Man, Carol Burnett also recognized Conway's strong desire to make Korman crack up during the show: "It was Tim's goal in life to destroy Harvey Korman."

== Sketches ==
Nº	Season	Episode	Airdate	Title
1	Season 3 (1969–1970)	Ep 5	October 20, 1969	"As the Stomach Turns" (as Grandpa) – The Oldest Man is the grandfather of Marian (Carol Burnett) whom she is planning to send to a retirement home.
2	Season 3 (1969–1970)	Ep 10	December 8, 1969	"Pit Stop" – The Oldest Man is a pit crew member who attempts to perform an oil change for a race-car driver (Harvey Korman).
3	Season 5 (1971–1972)	Ep 6	October 27, 1971	"The Safecracker" –The Oldest Man is a safecracker and the mastermind of a jewelry heist.
4	Season 6 (1972–1973)	Ep 7	October 25, 1972	"Galley Slaves" – The Oldest Man is a galley slave who creates trouble for his rowing partner (Harvey Korman) on a slave ship.
5	Season 6 (1972–1973)	Ep 20	February 17, 1973	"The Fireman" – The Oldest Man is a fireman who attempts to rescue a man (Harvey Korman) when a house is on fire.
6	Season 7 (1973–1974)	Ep 9	November 10, 1973	"As the Stomach Turns" (as Marvin Peterson Jr.) – The Oldest Man is the obscene phone caller who is telephoning Marian (Carol Burnett).
7	Season 7 (1973–1974)	Ep 12	December 8, 1973	"The Conductor" – The Oldest Man is a conductor who leads the Sydney Symphony Orchestra at the Sydney Opera House.
8	Season 7 (1973–1974)	Ep 17	February 2, 1974	"The Dresser" – The Oldest Man is a wardrobe dresser having problems helping an actor (Harvey Korman) with a quick change between acts of a play.
9	Season 8 (1974–1975)	Ep 11	December 7, 1974	"As the Stomach Turns" (as Uncle Waldo) – The Oldest Man is the wealthy uncle of Marian (Carol Burnett) who is being blackmailed.
10	Season 8 (1974–1975)	Ep 19	February 22, 1975	"The Old Witness" – A detective (Harvey Korman) interviews The Oldest Man after he witnesses a murder.
11	Season 8 (1974–1975)	Ep 24	April 5, 1975	"Clock Repair" – A business man (Harvey Korman) brings his grandfather clock to The Oldest Man for a repair and is in a hurry to get back to work.
12	Season 9 (1975–1976)	Ep 10	November 15, 1975	"The Doctor" – The Oldest Man is a doctor who makes a house call for a man (Harvey Korman) home sick with a bad cold.
13	Season 9 (1975–1976)	Ep 12	December 6, 1975	"The Torturer" – The Oldest Man is a royal torturer summoned by HRH (Harvey Korman) to convince a lady (Vicki Lawrence) to accept his marriage proposal.
14	Season 9 (1975–1976)	Ep 15	December 20, 1975	"The Shoe Store" – The Oldest Man is a shoe salesman trying to sell a pair of blue slippers to Stella Toddler (Carol Burnett).
15	Season 9 (1975–1976)	Ep 20	February 7, 1976	"The Sheriff" – The Oldest Man is a Wild West sheriff who must contend with a bank robber (Harvey Korman) before he can escape town.
16	Season 10 (1976–1977)	Ep 8	November 13, 1976	"The Butcher" – The Oldest Man is a butcher who tries to serve an impatient customer (Harvey Korman).
17	Season 10 (1976–1977)	Ep 9	November 20, 1976	"The Hot Dog Vendor" – A business man (Harvey Korman) on his lunch hour stops for a hot dog and a milkshake at a shop run by The Oldest Man.
18	Season 10 (1976–1977)	Ep 20	February 26, 1977	"As the Stomach Turns" (as Duane Toddleberry) – The Oldest Man is a life insurance agent visiting Marian (Carol Burnett) after she returns from her daughter's funeral.
19	Season 10 (1976–1977)	Ep 21	March 5, 1977	"The Captain" – A sailor (Harvey Korman) and The Oldest Man as a ship captain try to keep their ship from hitting an iceberg.
20	Season 10 (1976–1977)	Ep 22	March 19, 1977	"The Baggage Handler" – The Oldest Man works as a baggage handler at an airport.
21	Season 11 (1977–1978)	Ep 9	November 19, 1977	"Old-Timers" – The Oldest Man and Dick Van Dyke are legendary baseball hall-of-fame players from the turn of the century.

=== Later Appearances ===
- 2003–2008: Together Again – Tour with Harvey Korman
- 2010: Together Again – Collector's DVD
- 2014: "The Oldest Ski Jumper" – The Queen Latifah Show
- 2015: "The Oldest White House Butler" – The Queen Latifah Show
