= The Private Eyes (1980 film) =

1980 American comedy mystery film

- DVD cover
- Directed by: Lang Elliott
- Written by: Tim Conway; John Myhers
- Produced by: Wanda Dell; Lang Elliott
- Starring: Tim Conway; Don Knotts; Trisha Noble
- Cinematography: Jacques Haitkin
- Edited by: Patrick M. Crawford; Fabien D. Tordjmann
- Music by: Peter Matz
- Production companies: Tri Star Pictures; The Private Eyes Partners Limited
- Distributed by: New World Pictures
- Release date: April 17, 1980
- Running time: 91 minutes
- Country: United States
- Language: English
- Budget: $2.3 million
- Box office: $18,942,320 (U.S.) or $8.1 million

The Private Eyes is a 1980 American comedy mystery film starring Tim Conway and Don Knotts. The pair play bumbling American detectives who work for Scotland Yard. It was filmed at Biltmore Estate in Asheville, North Carolina.

The film was directed by Lang Elliott and was the final pairing of Conway and Knotts, not counting their cameos as two California Highway Patrol officers in the 1983 film Cannonball Run II.

== Plot ==
The film opens early in the twentieth century, at an English country mansion with the apparent murder of Lord and Lady Morley in their car by a figure in a black cape. Inspector Winship (Knotts) and Dr. Tart (Conway), two American detectives transferred over to Scotland Yard because of problems in the United States, travel to the Morley mansion, brandishing a letter from the late Lord Morley asking them to investigate his own murder. They encounter the attractive heiress - the Morley's adopted daughter Phyllis Morley (Trisha Noble) - and are introduced to the manor's questionable staff.

As the two investigate the murder, each of the staff, which includes a samurai, a hunchback, a busty maid, a gypsy, and an insane butler, are seemingly killed. However, each of their bodies disappear before the detectives can show them to the heiress. Their attempts to update Scotland Yard via homing pigeon are continuously thwarted, typically by the death of the pigeon. After discovering the manor's numerous hidden passages, the detectives wind up in a "torture chamber" and Winship is caught in a deadly trap. While Tart clumsily searches for a way to help, the caped figure ("The Shadow") leaps out to rescue Winship from the trap.

A boa constrictor then frightens them into a trash compactor, where they survive being compressed into a bale of garbage. Once out of the garbage, they find the heiress taking the Morley money and preparing to leave the mansion. She then confesses to having killed the Morleys for their money as she has a gambling habit. Planning to kill the detectives and escape the mansion, she falls backward into a flower bed while retreating, where she is grabbed by the shadowy figure, who has been hiding in the dirt. The shadow scares her to the point that she faints, at which time the shadow takes off his cape, revealing himself to be Lord Morley.

Morley had escaped the car crash and gathered the staff to gain their help in a plan to get the heiress to confess to the murder of his wife and the attempt on his own life. Morley remained "dead" (in hiding) as part of the plan, writing the letter to Scotland Yard in order to request Winship and Tart as investigators, presumably because of their incompetence. As Morley explains what he did, the members of the staff appear, having faked their own deaths as part of the plan. The heiress is arrested and Winship and Tart are thanked with a gift of a very rare sarcophagus, which is placed in their car.

As Winship and Tart drive away, they argue over the existence of creatures known as "wookalars", said to be manlike creatures with superhuman strength and a pig-like face. The film ends with their car careening down the road as they scream in terror, due to the sudden appearance of a wookalar from the sarcophagus.

== Main cast ==
- Don Knotts as Inspector Winship
- Tim Conway as Dr. Tart
- Trisha Noble as Mistress Phyllis Morley
- John Fujioka as Mr. Uwatsum
- Bernard Fox as Justin
- Grace Zabriskie as Nanny
- Stan Ross as Tibet
- Irwin Keyes as Jock
- Suzy Mandel as Hilda

== Background ==
The two comedic actors Conway and Knotts achieved success onscreen when they appeared in several family-friendly feature films for Disney: The Apple Dumpling Gang (1975), Gus (1976) (the only one not to feature the two onscreen together), and The Apple Dumpling Gang Rides Again (1979). Conway and John Myhers wrote a screenplay which became The Prize Fighter and after its success at the box office in 1979 (and in rentals), Conway and Myhers wrote another Knotts and Conway team-up, The Private Eyes.

== Reception ==
The Private Eyes earned $12 million in rentals during its initial release, and became the highest-grossing film made at New World Pictures under Roger Corman.
