= The Flying Dutchman (2000 film) =

The Flying Dutchman (Frozen in Fear)
- Directed by: Robin P. Murray
- Written by: Mick Davis
- Produced by: Richard Rionda Del Castro; Christopher Arnold
- Starring: Catherine Oxenberg; Eric Roberts; Rod Steiger
- Cinematography: Irv Goodnoff
- Edited by: Eddie Hamilton
- Distributed by: Hannibal Pictures
- Release date: January 22, 2001
- Running time: 94 minutes
- Country: United States
- Language: English

The Flying Dutchman is an American film of 2000, directed by Robin P. Murray and starring Catherine Oxenberg, Eric Roberts, and Rod Steiger.

The movie has also been called Frozen in Fear and is a re-working of The Mystery of the Wax Museum (1933) and House of Wax (1953).

A horror film, it was released on streaming media on September 11, 2001.

== Plot ==
An art buyer in Seattle buys a good painting from an old lady called Moira (Joan Benedict) and offers it to Lacy Anderson (Catherine Oxenberg), a dealer. Lacy is impressed and wants to represent the painter, who lives in a remote cabin by a lake at Dark Hollow, Western Montana, so she and her assistant Polly go there to meet Sean (Eric Roberts). Lacy falls for him, and when they go hiking in the mountains she is concussed, waking up in Sean’s bed. Sean and his friend Ben (Rod Steiger) look after her, and Sean wants Lacy to stay with him, but she plans to go back to Seattle. When Lacy fails to arrive home, Polly goes back to look for her and is captured by Sean. Lacy finds Ben, unhinged, holding Moira at gunpoint. Events from Sean’s childhood are then visited in a flashback: Sean saw his father kill his mother and then himself.

Lacy goes to Sean’s cabin looking for Polly and finds her chained to a table. Sean shows Lacy his ice sculpture "Maternal Ice Tomb", containing three naked women, in an ice house. He is about to kill Lacy when Moira’s friend Ethan arrives, armed with a gun, and stops him. Ethan then sees his missing girlfriend in the ice. Sean tries to kill Ethan, but Lacy gets hold of the gun and shoots Sean several times. Ethan, Polly and Lacy go to tell Moira Sean is dead, but soon Sean’s body disappears, with a trail of blood tracks leading to the lake.

Months later, at home in Seattle, Lacy receives a new painting by Sean, and then gets a phone call from him.

== Cast ==
- Catherine Oxenberg as Lacy Anderson
- Eric Roberts as Sean
- Rod Steiger as Ben
- Joan Benedict as Moira
- Scott Plank as Ethan
- Ellina McCormick as Polly
- Gabriel Clark as Vitally
- Douglas Sebern as Hans
- Barry Sigismondi as Nathaniel
- Christi Marsico as Astrid
- Brendan Shanahan as Simon
- Gillian Todd as Hippie Girl
- Ryan James Talbot as young Sean

== Reception ==
When the movie was released on video in 2003 as Frozen in Fear, Sean Abberton’s review for Michael DVD found that Rod Steiger was "the clear stand-out", stealing scenes from younger actors. He found the movie to be "amiably directed and photographed", but nevertheless "let down by a deplorably woeful script and one-dimensional character development".

Film Review gave the video release of 2003 a negative review under the heading "Frozen in Fear – it will leave you cold". It commented

Once again Eric Roberts proves that acting ability isn't inherent in the Roberts DNA as he stars (perhaps too strong a word) in this tawdry thriller which the cover laughably likens to Silence of the Lambs.

Den of Geek also reviewed the movie, calling it "quite possibly the hugest pile of shite anyone could ever have the misfortune to sit through."
