= Dorf on the Diamond =

- Directed by: Berry Landen
- Written by: Tim Conway
- Starring: Tim Conway; Shawn Hess; Tim Conway Jr.
- Distributed by: J2 Communications
- Release date: December 1, 1996
- Running time: 50 minutes
- Language: English

Dorf on the Diamond is a 1996 comedy short film starring Tim Conway, Shawn Hess and Tim Conway Jr.

== Plot ==
Baseball "Super Fan" Dorf goes to the East-West all star game. While enjoying the game, Dorf daydreams about being on the diamond himself and inspiring a baseball team to greatness as their coach (ala General Patton). Yet, even in his daydreams he's not entirely successful. Between daydreams, Dorf has his hands full coping with a bratty kid, a smart aleck peanut vendor and his uncooperative car.

== See also ==
- List of baseball films
