= Dorf (character) =

Fictional character

Dorf is a fictional character created by comedy writer and performer Tim Conway. He was the main character in a series of direct-to-video films during the 1980s and 1990s. Dorf was characterized by his diminutive height (he was performed by Conway standing in a hole with fake shoes attached to his knees), toupée, toothbrush mustache, pot belly, unusual accent (modeled by Conway on a Swedish accent, similar to that used by his Mr. Tudball character on The Carol Burnett Show), and frequent pratfalls. Each film focused on a particular sport, with Dorf humorously giving instructions on the history and play of the sport.

== History ==
The character was created by Conway for a sketch on The Tonight Show Starring Johnny Carson as a horse jockey. Based on the popularity of the sketch, he produced a set of direct-to-video comedy films, each focusing on a different sport, most of which were released through J2 Communications, which later became known for its purchase of the National Lampoon franchise. These included:

- Dorf on Golf (1987)
- Dorf and the First Games of Mount Olympus (1988)
- Dorf's Golf Bible (1988)
- Dorf Goes Auto Racing (1990)
- Dorf Goes Fishing (1993)
- Dorf on the Diamond (1996)
- Dorf's Christmas Specials (2009–2015)
- Chip & Bernie Save Christmas with Dorf (2016)

In the first four entries, Dorf is "assisted" by Boom-Boom LaRue (Michele Smith), a mute dumb blonde, and by either the perpetually spaced-out Leonard (Vincent Schiavelli) or nerdy Waldo (Eddie Deezen), who each serve as comic foil. Other characters replace them in later entries. Dorf serves mainly as a stooge in the dialogue, with much of the humor on his part coming from his pratfalls.

Other than the main series of films, Dorf has made numerous guest appearances on talk shows, award shows and television commercials. "Dorf on Stalking" was humorously referred to by Norm MacDonald on "Saturday Night Live" "Weekend Update" as a satirical title.
