= Dorf and the First Games of Mount Olympus =

- Videocassette cover
- Directed by: Lang Elliott
- Written by: Tim Conway
- Starring: Tim Conway; Vincent Schiavelli
- Distributed by: J2 Communications
- Release date: June 1, 1988
- Running time: 30 minutes
- Language: English

Dorf and the First Games of Mount Olympus is a 1988 comedy short film starring Tim Conway as Dorf and Vincent Schiavelli as Leonard.

== Plot ==
Set in A.D. 1 during the days of the Roman Empire, Emperor Dorf announces the first Olympic Games as a way to promote peace between the nations.

Each competition either includes only Dorf as a competitor, or Dorf sparring with Leonard: shot put, fencing, discus, pole vault, relay race, javelin, weightlifting, hurdles, balance beam, hammer throw and boxing. In the end, Dorf, as emperor, is awarded first prize despite losing most of the head-to-head matches to Leonard. The prize is a massive millstone, which causes Dorf to tumble off the podium when it is placed on his neck.

== Cast ==
- Vincent Schiavelli as Leonard
- Tim Conway as Dorf
- Anthony De Franco as Neighbor
- Anthony B. DeFranco as Neighbor
- Michele Smith as "Boom-Boom" LaRue
