= Vincent Schiavelli =

American actor (1948–2005)

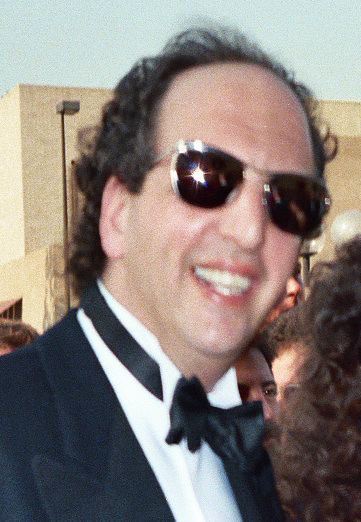
- Schiavelli in 1987
- Born: Vincent Andrew Schiavelli; November 11, 1948; New York City, U.S.
- Died: December 26, 2005 (aged 57); Polizzi Generosa, Sicily, Italy
- Education: New York University (MFA)
- Occupation: Actor
- Years active: 1971–2005; 1993−2005 (writing)
- Spouses: Allyce Beasley (m. 1985; div. 1988) Carol Sue Mukhalian (m. 1992)
- Children: 1

Vincent Andrew Schiavelli (/ˌskiːəˈvɛli/ SKEE-ə-VEL-ee; November 11, 1948 – December 26, 2005) was an American character actor noted for his work on stage, screen, and television. Described as an "instantly recognizable sad-faced actor", he was diagnosed with Marfan syndrome in childhood.

Schiavelli gained fame as a character actor, mainly in supporting roles. He was a regular in the films of Miloš Forman including as Fredrickson in One Flew Over the Cuckoo's Nest (1975), Antonio Salieri's valet in Amadeus (1984), Jean in Valmont (1989), Chester in The People vs. Larry Flynt (1996), and ABC executive Maynard Smith in Man on the Moon (1999).

His other roles include Mr. Vargas in Fast Times at Ridgemont High (1982), John O'Connor in The Adventures of Buckaroo Banzai Across the 8th Dimension (1982), the Subway Ghost in Ghost (1990), Organ Grinder in Batman Returns (1992), Lanny in The X-Files episode "Humbug" (1995), Dr. Kaufman in Tomorrow Never Dies (1997), and Buggy Ding Dong in Death to Smoochy (2002). Schiavelli is the subject of the biographical film, Tanti beddi cosi (English, Many Beautiful Things) about his return to Polizzi Generosa, the historically significant ancestral village of his grandfather.

== Early life ==
Schiavelli was born in Brooklyn, New York City to Sicilian-Americans John Schiavelli and Katherine Coco. He attended Bishop Loughlin Memorial High School in Brooklyn. He was raised in the large Sicilian neighborhood of Bushwick, Brooklyn, the stories and recipes of which he shared in his 1998 book Bruculinu, Remembrances of Sicilian American Brooklyn. He studied acting through the theatre program at New York University and began performing on stage in the 1960s.

== Career ==
Schiavelli's first film role occurred in Miloš Forman's 1971 production Taking Off, where he played a counselor who taught parents of runaway teens to smoke marijuana to better understand their children's experiences. Schiavelli's aptitude and distinctive appearance soon provided him with a steady stream of supporting roles, often in Forman's films, including One Flew Over the Cuckoo's Nest, Amadeus, The People vs. Larry Flynt, Valmont, and the 1999 biopic Man on the Moon.

He played Mr. Vargas, the biology teacher, in the 1982 comedy Fast Times at Ridgemont High, a role he reprised in the 1986 television spin-off Fast Times. He was cast in a similar role in Better Off Dead in which he played geometry teacher Mr. Kerber.

In 1987, he starred alongside Tim Conway in the short film comedy Dorf on Golf, and then Dorf and the First Games of Mount Olympus in 1988. In 1990, he played the Subway Ghost in Ghost and in 1992, he played in Tim Burton's Batman Returns as the "Organ Grinder", one of the Penguin's henchmen. He appeared as another villain in the James Bond film Tomorrow Never Dies (1997), as a silent monk in The Frisco Kid (1979), and as John O'Connor, one of the evil Red Lectroids in 1984's The Adventures of Buckaroo Banzai Across the 8th Dimension. In 1994 he appeared in the music video for ZZ Top's "Breakaway", alongside Fairuza Balk and in 1997, was named one of America's best character actors by Vanity Fair magazine. He also made several voice appearances in the animated television show Hey Arnold!. In 2002, he played a children's television show host turned heroin addict named Buggy Ding Dong in Death to Smoochy.

His first television role came in 1972 as Peter Panama in The Corner Bar, the first sustained portrayal of a gay character on American television. His other television credits include The Moneychangers, Buffy the Vampire Slayer, WKRP in Cincinnati, Benson, and Taxi as the priest who marries Latka and Simka. He appeared in the Star Trek: The Next Generation episode "The Arsenal of Freedom" as a holographic salesman, on Miami Vice as a research scientist who conspires to steal a top-secret prototype weapon from his employer, and in an uncredited role in an episode of Punky Brewster. In 1987 he appeared as Lyle, a gangster, in the MacGyver season 2 episode "Soft Touch". In Highlander: The Series, he played Leo Atkins, a homeless Vietnam War veteran accused of murder, in the Season 1 episode "Innocent Man". In The X-Files, he played Lanny, a man with an underdeveloped conjoined twin in the Season 2 episode "Humbug".

Schiavelli was honorary co-chair of the National Marfan Foundation, an organization that serves those affected by Marfan syndrome, a condition that Schiavelli had.

Schiavelli also performed in a few video games, including Emperor: Battle for Dune (as Harkonnen Mentat Yanich Kobal) and as Dr. Hellman in the video game Corpse Killer.

== Personal life ==
Schiavelli was married twice. He and his first wife, actress Allyce Beasley, were married from 1985 to 1988. They appeared together in an episode of Moonlighting, Beasley's television series. They had one son, composer Andrea Schiavelli. Vincent Schiavelli then married harpist Carol Sue Mukhalian on October 23, 1992. They remained married until his death.

Schiavelli was also a food and cookbook writer.

== Death ==
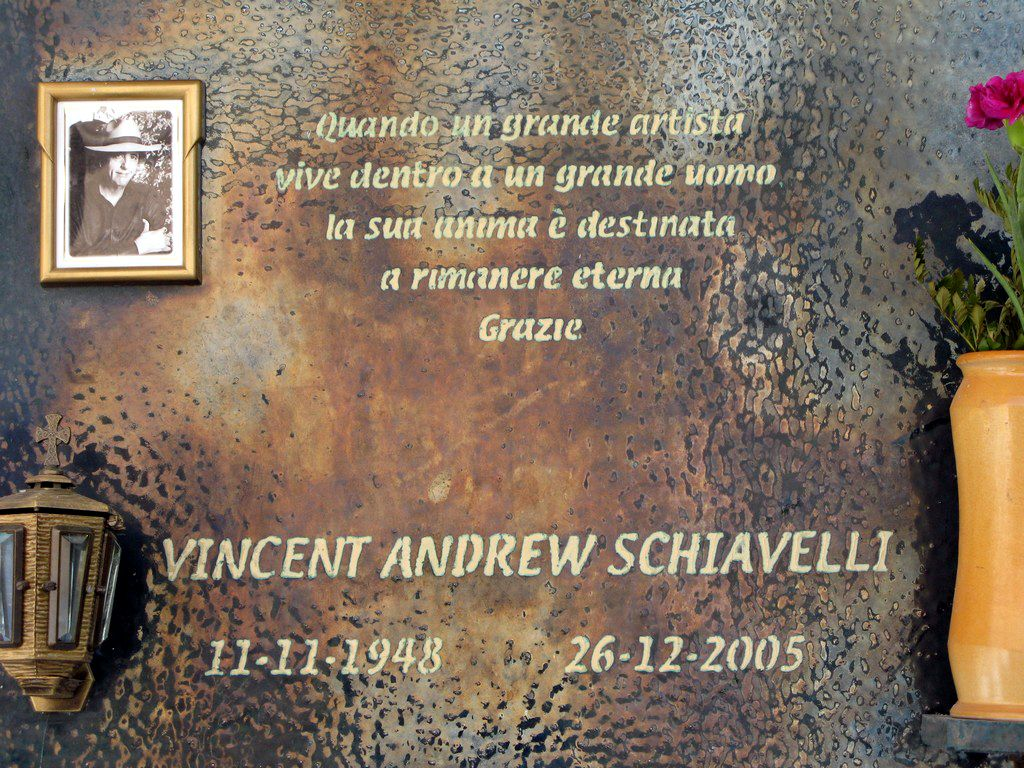
Schiavelli's tombstone in the Polizzi Generosa graveyard

Schiavelli died of lung cancer on December 26, 2005, at the age of 57 at his home in Polizzi Generosa, the Sicilian town near Palermo where his grandfather Andrea Coco was born, and about which he wrote in his 2002 book Many Beautiful Things: Stories and Recipes from Polizzi Generosa (ISBN 0-7432-1528-1). He was buried at the Polizzi Generosa cemetery.

== Filmography ==
=== Film ===
Year	Title	Role	Notes
1971	Taking Off	Schiavelli	
1974	The Great Gatsby	Thin Man	Uncredited
1974	For Pete's Sake	Grocery Clerk	
1975	The Happy Hooker	Music Guru	
1975	One Flew Over the Cuckoo's Nest	Bruce Frederickson	
1976	Next Stop, Greenwich Village	Rent Party Guest	Uncredited
1976	Angels	Tex	
1977	Close Encounters of the Third Kind	Policeman	Uncredited
1977	Another Man, Another Chance	Train Traveler	Uncredited
1978	An Unmarried Woman	Man at Party	
1979	Butch and Sundance: The Early Days	Guard	
1979	The Frisco Kid	Brother Bruno	
1980	The Gong Show Movie	Mario Romani	
1980	Seed of Innocence	Leo	
1980	The Return	Prospector	
1981	American Pop	Theatre Owner	
1981	Chu Chu and the Philly Flash	B.J.	
1981	The Gangster Chronicles	Jacob "Gurrah" Shapiro	
1982	Night Shift	Carl	
1982	Fast Times at Ridgemont High	Mr. Vargas	
1983	The Selling of Vince D'Angelo	Vince's Right Hand Man	
1984	Kidco	Phil Porzinski	
1984	The Adventures of Buckaroo Banzai Across the 8^{th} Dimension	John O'Connor	
1984	Amadeus	Salieri's Valet	
1984	Johnny Dangerously	Roman Moronie's Building Planner	Uncredited
1985	Better Off Dead	Mr. Kerber	
1988	Time Out	Receptionist	
1989	Cold Feet	Vet	
1989	Homer and Eddie	Priest	
1989	Valmont	Jean	
1990	Playroom	Roman Hart	
1990	Waiting for the Light	Mullins	
1990	Mister Frost	Angelo	
1990	Ghost	Subway Ghost	
1990	Penny Ante: The Motion Picture	Davidson	
1991	Another You	Dentist	
1991	Ted & Venus	Publisher	
1992	Batman Returns	Organ Grinder	
1992	Miracle Beach	Mystic	
1993	Painted Desert	Harry	
1994	Lurking Fear	Knaggs	
1994	Cultivating Charlie	Martin	
1995	Escape to Witch Mountain	Waldo Fudd	
1995	3 Ninjas Knuckle Up	Mayor	
1995	Lord of Illusions	Vinovich	
1995	Two Much	Sommelier	
1995	"The Little Princess	Mr Barrow	
1996	Back to Back	Leonardo	
1996	The People vs. Larry Flynt	Chester	
1996	Independence Day	Dr. Hartmut Engel	News Footage
1997	The Beautician and the Beast	Jailer	
1997	Tomorrow Never Dies	Dr. Kaufman	
1998	Casper Meets Wendy	Vincent	
1998	Love Kills	Emmet	
1998	Restons groupés	Gary	
1998	Rusty: A Dog's Tale	Carney Boss	
1998	Milo	Dr. Matthew	
1999	Inferno	Mr. Singh	
1999	Treehouse Hostage	Gardener	Uncredited
1999	Man on the Moon	Maynard Smith, ABC Executive	
1999	The Prince and the Surfer	Baumgarten	
1999	American Virgin	Cab Driver	
2000	3 Strikes	Cortino	
2000	The Pooch and the Pauper	Willy Wishbow	
2001	Snow White: The Fairest of Them All	Wednesday	
2001	American Saint	Charley Grebbini	
2002	Hey Arnold!: The Movie	Mr. Bailey (voice)	
2002	Death to Smoochy	Buggy Ding Dong	
2002	Solino	Director Baldi	
2002	The 4^{th} Tenor	Marcello	
2003	Baadasssss!	Jerry	
2003	Ferrari	Mr. Paradise	
2003	Baggage	Thomas Horelick	
2003	Gli indesiderabili	Frank Frigenti	
2005	Miracle in Palermo!	Federico II	
2005	Once Upon a Time in Polizzi	Himself	
2006	Nuovomondo	Marriage Broker	Posthumous role
2007	Oliviero Rising	Albino	Posthumous role
2010	The Passport	Inspector Manuel Silvera	Short film, posthumous role, final film role

=== Television ===
Year	Title	Role	Notes
1972	The Corner Bar	Peter Panama	
1978	Rescue from Gilligan's Island	Dimitri	Television film
1979	WKRP In Cincinnati	Don Pesola #1	Episode: "The Contest Nobody Could Win"
1980	Escape	J.W. White	Television film
1980	White Mama	Medic	
1980	Nightside	Tom Adams	Television film
1981	Comedy of Horrors	Gregory	Television film
1981	The Fall Guy	Motel manager	Television film
1982	Taxi	Reverend Gorky	2 Episodes
1983	Little Shots	Smokey Joe	Television film
1984	The Ratings Game	Skip	Television film
1984	Night Court	Peter DeMarco	
1985	Lots of Luck	Skinny	Television film
1985	Moonlighting	Rodney Dillon	Episode: "Next Stop Murder"
1985	Otherworld	Priest	Episode: "Village of the Motorpigs"
1985	Punky Brewster	Mr.Pieces	Episode: "Perils of Punky"
1985	Who's the Boss?	Motel Manager	2 Episodes
1986	Remington Steele	Leon Pulver	Episode: "Steele on the Air"
1987	MacGyver	Lyle	Episode: "Soft Touch"
1987	Star Trek: The Next Generation	The Peddler	Episode: "The Arsenal of Freedom"
1987	Bride of Boogedy	Lazarus	Television film
1989	Miami Vice	Lawrence Fowler	Episode: "World of Trouble"
1991	Eerie, Indiana	The Dentist	Episode: "The Retainer"
1992	Highlander: The Series	Leo	Episode: "Innocent Man"
1993	Batman: The Animated Series	Zatara (voice)	Episode: "Zatanna"
1995	The Courtyard	Ivan	Television film
1995	Brother's Destiny	Davinport	Television film
1995	Aaahh!!! Real Monsters	Lapin Perdido, Announcer (voice)	Episode: "Hats Off"
1995	The X-Files	Lanny	Episode: "Humbug"
1996	Hey Arnold!	Pigeon Man, Mr. Bailey (voice)	2 episodes
1998	Buffy, the Vampire Slayer	Enyos	2 episodes
2000	Sabrina, the Teenage Witch	Pastor	Episode: "Salem's Daughter"
2005	La bambina dalle mani sporche	Silva Roibes	
