= Dorf on Golf =

1987 film

- Directed by: Roger Beatty
- Written by: Tim Conway
- Produced by: Tom Egan
- Starring: Tim Conway; Vincent Schiavelli; Michele Smith
- Cinematography: Sandra Chandler
- Edited by: Ron Menzies; Ken Laski
- Music by: Brian Banks; Anthony Marinelli
- Production companies: Longshot Enterprises, Inc.
- Distributed by: J2 Communications
- Release date: 1987
- Running time: 30 minutes
- Language: English

Dorf on Golf is a 1987 comedy short film starring Tim Conway, Vincent Schiavelli and Michele Smith. The film is the first in a series of eight films released by Conway and J2 Communications using the Dorf sporting theme. The film had a total cast of three people.

== Cast ==
- Tim Conway as Derk Dorf
- Vincent Schiavelli as Leonard
- Michele Smith as "Boom-Boom" LaRue

== Characters ==
- Dorf is the main character, giving instruction in how to play golf. He is apparently Swedish (his accent is from Conway's "Mr. Tudball" character on The Carol Burnett Show) and is about as tall as a 5-year-old; his height and some humorous movements are achieved by Conway standing in a hole, with fake shoes attached above his knees. As a result, Dorf always stands in one place.
- Leonard is Dorf's clueless caddy, about twice as tall as Dorf. As Dorf tells Leonard what to do, he'll usually answer "Right" (when he finds the Five-Iron, Dorf proclaims, "You get your numbers and colors down, you're going to be a real threat!")
- Boom-Boom Larue is a posing character, a shapely but silent blonde that "helps" Dorf out when he's explaining the "dog-leg" hole. She annoys Dorf when her hot dog sticks to his stick and when she drops an illustration because she's fixing her hair.

== Home media ==
Dorf on Golf was a success on home video. The first three films in the Dorf series had sold 360,000 units by 1989. All were originally priced at $29.95.
