= Hermie and Friends =

Christian animated film series

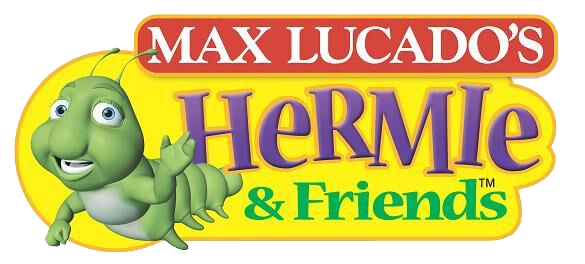
- Created by: Max Lucado
- Based on: Hermie: A Common Caterpiller
- Written by: Troy Schmidt
- Screenplay by: Troy Schmidt
- Voices of: Tim Conway; Don Knotts; John Causby; Melissa Disney; Sam Merucio; Rob Pottorf
- Music by: Rob Pottorf; Jamie Hagerty (additional music)
- Composer: Rob Pottorf
- Country of origin: United States
- Original language: English
- No. of episodes: 16

Production
- Producer: Rick Eldridge
- Running time: 26-40 minutes
- Production companies: Tommy Nelson/Thomas Nelson, Inc. Glueworks Entertainment; Dean River Productions (2003-2006); Peculiar Pictures (2002-2003, 2005); Huhu Studios (2004-2005, 2007-2008); ORG Studios, Inc. (2009-2010)

Original release
- Release: 2002 – 2010

Hermie and Friends is an American Christian direct-to-video series for children which ran from 2002 to 2010. Produced by Tommy Nelson and GlueWorks Entertainment, the show is animated using 3D animation and follows a pair of caterpillars named Hermie and Wormie.

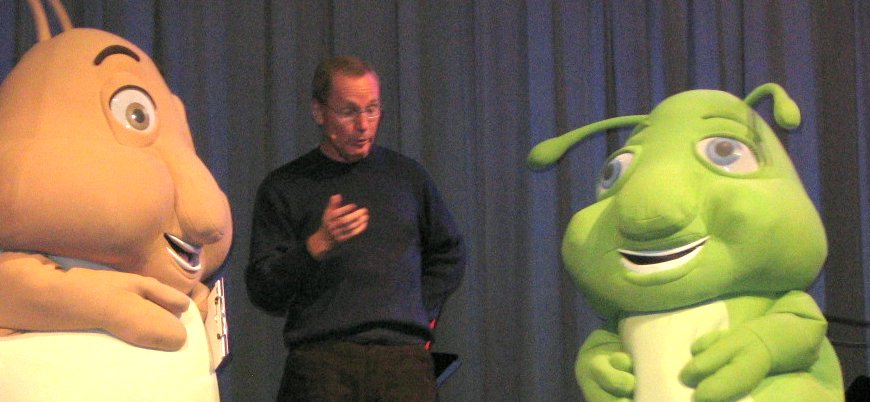
Author Max Lucado with the characters Hermie and Wormie

The show started with a 40-minute Max Lucado video special called Hermie: A Common Caterpillar, based on his book of the same name. The show was turned into a video series that takes place before Hermie became a butterfly. Licensed products include Christian video games, which loosely follow the videos.

It was also broadcast internationally on the Australian Christian Channel and Disney Channel Australia.

In America, Hermie and Friends formerly aired on TBN but it is currently available through their streaming service, Yippee TV.

== Cast and characters ==
- Tim Conway as Hermie, a green caterpillar and the main protagonist. In the series, Hermie goes on adventures in Lucado's garden. He will occasionally discuss the topic of the episode in the beginning with a live-action Lucado. His role is that of a comic relief character and he will typically take "the wrong path" in episodes until given guidance from Wormie.
- Don Knotts (2003-2006) and John Causby (2007-2010) as Wormie, a cream white caterpillar and Hermie's best friend. In contrast to Hermie, Wormie is kind and friendly, however tends to become angry when others do wrong. He has a habit of reciting Bible verses and explaining their meanings to other characters. Knotts died on February 24, 2006, shortly after recording his lines for "To Share or Nut to Share," which was released posthumously. John Causby took over for the remainder of the series.
- Vicki Lawrence as Flo, a talkative pink fly. She was originally dubbed "Flo the Lyin' Fly" until she learns to tell the truth with the help of Hermie and Wormie.
- Melissa Disney as:
  - Lucy, a red and black ladybug. She is Hailey's and Bailey's kind-hearted mother. She tries everything to discipline and scold her disobeying children and give them guidance. She frequently references her marital status, yet her husband remains unseen throughout the series. He was shown once briefly, with his name being revealed as Ricky.
  - Hailey and Bailey, the red and black ladybug twins of Lucy. The two characters are always mischievous and tend to disobey their mother. Hailey's love of tomatoes and Bailey's love of blueberries conflict each other, as shown in "Hailey and Bailey's Silly Fight."
  - Lizzie, a green lizard
  - Adam and Annette Ant, two brown ants in the garden
- Sam Mercurio as:
  - Antonio, the leader of the brown ant army of the garden. He is brave and helps protect the garden. He is sometimes shown wearing a soldier hat.
  - Milt, a blue caterpillar with red spots and another of Hermie's neighbors.
  - Buzby, a misbehaving yellow and black striped honey bee who later learns to follow the rules. Buzby is an amazing speller, in reference to Spelling bees. He loves singing and playing the guitar. He has a niece, named Beebee, and a nephew, named Buddy. Buzby’s voice, design, and mannerisms are reminiscent of Elvis Presley as well as 50’s and 60’s greasers.
  - God, who listens to the bugs when they pray and provides them with wisdom, guidance, and love.
  - Private, a brown ant army of the garden.
  - Hermie, a green caterpillar and main character. (2008; 2010 as young Hermie)
  - The Narrator Guy, offscreen.
- Wayne Powers as:
  - Schneider, a blue-skinned Snail with an orange shell.
  - Gator, a green alligator.
  - Al, Art and Private Ant, Brown-ant Army members of the Garden
- Frank Peretti as Puffy, the orange dragonfly.
- Tahj Mowry as Webster, a smart, blue and purple spider with yellow spots and glasses. When he first appears, he is afraid. Later he learns to be brave by saying "God is with me". He is named after Webster's Dictionary.
- Mac Powell, Tai Anderson, Mark Lee, and Brad Avery, as The Waterbeetles: Stringo, Lingo, Bingo, and Zingo. They are a famous band in the garden and a parody of The Beatles.
- Rick Burgess and Bill "Bubba" Bussey Jr. as Iggy and Ziggy, two mischievous cockroaches. They are typically hosts in games or other events throughout the series.
- Rob Pottorf as:
  - Freddie, an orange flea.
  - Skeeter M. Skeeto, a blue mosquito.
  - Al, a brown ant army of the garden.
  - Webster, a smart, blue and purple spider with yellow spots and glasses. (2008)
  - Carson, a green caterpillar who's Hermie's cousin.
  - Schneider Snail, a blue-skinned Snail with an orange shell. (2007, 2009)
- Judge Reinhold as Stanley, whose character is disliked by others due to being a stink bug. Stanley is a stinkbug who stinks when he's afraid, which tends to be often. He is shown to be good at sports.
- Richard Kind as Milo, a green praying mantis who does not know how to pray to God. The character owns a snack shack in the garden that he claims has been there for generations. Milo then learns to pray with the help of Hermie and Wormie.
- Dan Lynch as Big Bully Croaker, a giant green bullfrog with a toothless mouth and purple prehensile tongue. He is the main antagonist of the series. He causes trouble in the garden and tries to devour the bugs.
- Victoria Jackson as Beebee, Buzby's niece.
- Josh Hall as Buddy, Buzby's nephew
- John O'Hurley as Sinclair M. Skeeto, Skeeter's brother.
- Catherine Smith and Jill Bloede as:
  - Catelyn, a pink caterpillar and one of Hermie's neighbors.
  - Annie, a brown ant.
- Kasey Brennan as:
  - Lucy Ladybug, a red and black ladybug. She is Hailey's and Bailey's kind-hearted mother. (2010)
  - Hailey and Bailey Ladybug, the red and black ladybug twins of Lucy. (2010)
  - Adam and Annette Ant, two brown ants in the garden (2009)
  - Flo, the talkative pink Fly. (Young Flo in 2010)
- Fred Willard as Angus O'Reilly, a red ant. he is Antonio's cousin who likes playing bagpipes and golf, and wearing kilts. Antonio learn to love his neighbors.
- Buddy Lewis as:
  - Puffy, the orange dragonfly (2008-2009).
  - Wallace, a 1st pal of Angus O'Reilly.
- Will Howard as:
  - Rodney, a 2nd pal of Angus O'Reilly.
  - Artie Ant, a brown ant.
- John Causby as Announcer for "Win, Lose or Honey!".

== Episodes ==
- "Hermie: A Common Caterpillar" (December 10, 2002)
- "Flo the Lyin' Fly" (December 5, 2003)
- "Webster the Scaredy Spider" (March 31, 2004)
- "Buzby, the Misbehaving Bee" (February 12, 2005)
- "A Fruitcake Christmas" (September 6, 2005)
- "Stanley the Stinkbug Goes to Camp" (January 24, 2006)
- "To Share or Nut to Share" (August 23, 2006)
- "Milo: The Mantis Who Wouldn't Pray" (February 10, 2007)
- "Buzby and the Grumble Bees" (September 22, 2007)
- "Hailey and Bailey's Silly Fight" (January 26, 2008)
- "Hermie and the High Seas" (March 15, 2008)
- "Hermie the Uncommon DJ" (April 21, 2008)
- "Skeeter and the Mystery of the Lost Mosquito Treasure" (January 4, 2009)
- "The Flo Show Creates a Buzz" (July 9, 2009)
- "Antonio Meets His Match" (March 30, 2010)
- "Who's in Charge Anyway?" (May 1, 2010)

== Shorts ==
Shorts are released in DVDs. They usually follow the focus of the main episode. Sam Mercurio and Melissa Disney provide the narrations.

- The Flood of Lies
- The Race of Fear
- The Straight Path
- A Friend In Need
- Win, Lose, or Honey!
- Buzby's Beach Blanket Bug Bash
- Spelling Bee
- Hermielocks
- Hermie Had a Little Lamb
- Little Red Hermie in the Hood
- Caterpilla
