= The Longshot =

- Directed by: Paul Bartel
- Written by: Tim Conway
- Produced by: Lang Elliott; Mike Nichols (executive producer)
- Starring: Tim Conway; Harvey Korman; Jack Weston; Ted Wass; Stella Stevens; Anne Meara; George DiCenzo; Jonathan Winters
- Cinematography: Robby Müller
- Edited by: Alan Toomayan
- Music by: Charles Fox
- Distributed by: Orion Pictures
- Release date: January 17, 1986
- Running time: 89 minutes
- Country: United States
- Language: English
- Box office: $256,301 (US)

The Longshot is a 1986 American comedy film directed by Paul Bartel and starring Tim Conway.

== Plot ==
Four friends enjoy betting on horses at the race track. Someone tells them that he has something he can give his horse to make it run faster, and they can win a lot of money if they bet on it. Dooley tries to romance Nicki Dixon to get the money, but he finds out she is a lunatic who tries to kill him when he reminds her of her ex-husband. Later, they borrow an envelope of money from the Mob, who expect them to pay back within a week. They find out that the man who gave them the tip is a fraud, but Dooley remembers someone saying that the horse will run fast if he sees red, so he runs out to the track, waving a red dress, and the horse wins the race.

== Cast ==
- Tim Conway as Dooley
- Harvey Korman as Lou
- Jack Weston as Elton
- Ted Wass as Stump
- Stella Stevens as Nicki Dixon
- Anne Meara as Madge
- George DiCenzo as DeFranco
- Jorge Cervera as Santiago
- Jonathan Winters as Tyler
- Frank Bonner as Realtor
- Eddie Deezen as Parking Attendant
- Nick Dimitri as Track Cop
- Garry Goodrow as Josh
- Edie McClurg as Donna
- Joseph Ruskin as Fusco

== Theme song ==
"The Longshot", the film's title track, is performed by Irene Cara.

== See also ==
- List of films about horses
- List of films about horse racing
