= John Myhers =

American stage and screen actor (1921–1992)

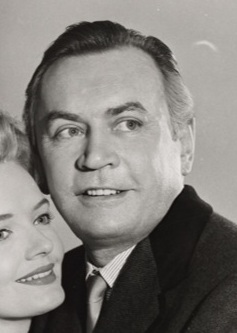
- Myhers in The Sound of Music, 1961
- Born: John Benjamin Myhers; December 18, 1921; Strum, Wisconsin, U.S.
- Died: May 27, 1992 (aged 70); Los Angeles, California, U.S.
- Resting place: Forest Lawn Memorial Park (Hollywood Hills)
- Years active: 1951–1985
- Height: 6 ft 0 in (1.83 m)
- Spouse: Joan Benedict (m. 1962)
- Children: 1

John Benjamin Myhers (December 18, 1921 – May 27, 1992) was an American stage and screen actor. His film roles included playing Mr. Bratt in the film adaptation of the Broadway musical How to Succeed in Business Without Really Trying (1967), Robert Livingston in the 1972 film adaptation of the Broadway musical 1776, and as the leader of the Roman Senate in Mel Brooks' History of the World, Part I (1981).

== Early life and education ==
Myhers was born in Strum, Wisconsin, the son of Ole Myhers (1896–1941) and Mabel (née Borreson) Myhers (1902–1964), who later married Hal DeRoach. Myhers began singing at the age of 12 and won several leading roles in the St. Paul Civic Opera during his student years at McPhail School of Music in St. Paul. He served in the United States Armed Forces in Italy during World War II and stayed in Rome for 11 years after the war. He studied at the American Academy and earned a doctoral degree in literature from the University of Rome.

== Career ==
=== Theatre ===
He performed leading roles in Broadway shows such as Kiss Me Kate, The Golden Fleecing and The Good Soup, and most notably played the role of Captain Von Trapp in the First National Touring Company of The Sound of Music in the early 1960s and later. He played opposite Katharine Hepburn in a Stratford, Connecticut, production of Antony and Cleopatra. He also appeared opposite actors such as Jack Lemmon and Charlton Heston in theatrical plays across the country.

=== Film ===
His most notable film role was playing Bert O. Bratt in the film adaptation of How to Succeed in Business Without Really Trying. He played Robert Livingston in 1776 (he also played the role in the Broadway version), and also appeared in Mel Brooks' History of the World, Part I as the leader of the Roman Senate. Other film credits include Quo Vadis, Willard, Weddings and Babies, and several Disney movies (including Treasure of Matecumbe, The Shaggy D.A. and Now You See Him, Now You Don't). Myhers wrote, directed and made a cameo appearance in the little-known 1965 comedy Saturday Night Bath in Apple Valley, which co-starred his wife Joan Benedict (later Joan Benedict Steiger) and was issued on VHS and DVD-R by Something Weird Video.

=== Television ===
Myhers also had a robust career on television, appearing on shows like Get Smart; Hogan's Heroes; The Mothers-in-Law; I Dream of Jeannie; Love, American Style; Alice; The Waltons and Fantasy Island. He was also the voice of Hector Heathcote on The Hector Heathcote Show in 1961, and in a series of animated shorts that ran from 1959 to 1971. His last acting appearance was in 1985 on The Twilight Zone in the episode "Ye Gods".

== Personal life and death ==
Myhers was married to Joan Benedict from 1962 to his death in 1992. He died of pneumonia on May 27, 1992, at Cedars-Sinai Medical Center in Los Angeles, California, and was survived by his wife and his daughter Claudia Myhers Tschudin. Myhers is buried at Forest Lawn Memorial Park-Hollywood Hills.

== Partial filmography ==
- La vendetta del corsaro (1951)
- Quo Vadis (1951) as Guard (uncredited)
- O.K. Nero! (1951)
- The Small Miracle (1951)
- Weddings and Babies (1958) as Al
- Saturday Night in Apple Valley (1965)
- How to Succeed in Business Without Really Trying (1967) as Bert O. Bratt
- The Wicked Dreams of Paula Schultz (1968) as Boss
- The Private Navy of Sgt. O'Farrell (1968) as Lt. Cmdr. Roger Snavely
- 2000 Years Later (1969) as Air Force General
- Willard (1971) as Carlson
- Now You See Him, Now You Don't (1972) as Golfer
- 1776 (1972) as Robert Livingston (NY)
- Snowball Express (1972) as Mr. Manescue
- Awake and Sing! (1972 PBS - TV) as Schlosser
- Walking Tall (1973) as Lester Dickens
- Herbie Rides Again (1974) as Announcer at San Francisco's Office of the President
- The Strongest Man in the World (1975) as Mr. Roscoe
- Linda Lovelace for President (1975) as Billy Leroy Boy
- Train Ride to Hollywood (1975) as Sheik
- Street People (1976) as Francis (uncredited)
- Treasure of Matecumbe (1976) as Captain Boomer
- The Shaggy D.A. (1976) as Adm. Brenner
- The Happy Hooker Goes to Washington (1977) as Donald Axelrod
- The Billion Dollar Hobo (1977) as Cox
- The Prize Fighter (1979) as Doyle
- History of the World, Part I (1981) as Leader of Senate (The Roman Empire)
