= Dorf Goes Fishing =

- Theatrical release poster
- Directed by: Berry Landen
- Written by: Tim Conway
- Starring: Tim Conway; Ronnie Schell; Yvonne Wilder
- Distributed by: J2 Communications
- Release date: December 1, 1993
- Running time: 45 minutes
- Language: English

Dorf Goes Fishing is a 1993 comedy short film in the Dorf series, starring Tim Conway, Ronnie Schell and Yvonne Wilder.

== Plot ==
=== Grunt the Caveman ===
Dorf begins the video by introducing us to 'Grunt', a caveman who looks peculiarly similar to Dorf (and is also played by Tim Conway). Grunt is credited as the caveman that 'discovers' fishing and yelling. He is not too intelligent, but he knows that 'food can be gotten from the water. The question was how to get that food out of the water and into your mouth.' After many attempts (including discovering two physics formulas when trying a bow and arrow, the latter of which is because he shot himself in the foot, and his attempt with raw meat only succeeding in attracting "his old friend" the bear), a vine works (by accident).

=== Fishing Gear ===
Dorf demonstrates modern clothes and equipment of fishing, albeit not properly.

=== Dorf and His Wife - Segment One ===
Dorf's friend Billy Bob couldn't make it to fish, so Dorf convinces his amateur wife to join him. Despite inappropriate clothing and nearly useless gear, she catches more fish than her husband.

=== The D.I.P. Shopping Network ===
The video shifts gears and turns to the "Discount In Price" shopping channel, or "DIP" for short. All of their products have the name "DIP" in them. Dorf demonstrates the items, often with their negative side effects included. The number to order them from is 1-(555) DIP-FISH.

=== Dorf and His Wife - Segment Two ===
Dorf and his wife continue to fish; at this point, she has over 30 fish, while Dorf has none. Dorf is, however, determined to catch a fish, and determines that her simple pole is superior to his own. However, after they trade, his wife catches yet another impressive fish, while Dorf's bacon has been stolen away.

=== Cooking with Carly ===
Dorf has prepared his campsite for his favorite cooking show, "Cooking with Carly". Carly (also played by Tim Conway) is a ditzy chef who appears to have drunken a bit too much 'Sauce'. The recipe is for 'Taters, Fish, and Biscuits'.

- Step One Carly instructs that the potatoes have to be washed and covered in aluminum foil. Dorf hurriedly douses them in water to keep up with the show's fast pace, but fumbles with the foil, tossing the potatoes hastily in the fire.
- Step Two Carly begins to filet the fish with 'one swipe', but Dorf claims that his wife has been 'cutting cardboard boxes' with the filet knife, so he proceeds to sharpen the knife, but slices his finger in the process. After wrapping the wound in an oily rag, he attempts to debone the fish, but fumbles when he tries to take the whole skeleton out in one quick swipe.
- Step Three Carly opens the biscuit mix bag easily, but Dorf fails to rip it open as easily. As he fails to keep up, he burns his hand on the oven, but places the mix inside.
- Step Four Dorf places the fish into the frying pan, but cannot bring the plastic wrap under control to cover his biscuit mix.
- Step Five Carly instructs to remove the fish from the frying pan, but warns that the handle may be hot. Dorf does not heed this warning, however, causing him to throw the pan (and fish) into the air. The fish lands on the ground, ruining it.
- Step Six Again, Carly warns that the potatoes cannot be placed in the center of the campfire. As Dorf wonders about this, a potato suddenly flies out, barely missing his head. Another potato explodes into his face, covering him in potato pieces.
- Step Seven Carly shows the eight-minute biscuits she prepared. However, Dorf's are still extremely runny as he takes them out of the oven. Carly reminds everyone that at a high altitude campsite, cooking the biscuits require an extra two minutes.
- Step Eight Carly retrieves a set-up version of the meal from off-set, which is inexplicably and obviously pre-prepared. Dorf's fish, potatoes, and biscuits are ruined, and of course nothing like the show claims. Carly finally recommends that the meal be finished off with 'sauce', and she swigs some with a "WOO-HOO!" as the program ends. Dorf angrily takes a swig from his water supply and mutters, "Awoo-hoo." As he walks away from the campsite, the last potato explodes into his face, and he drenches his face in water to keep from getting burnt.

=== Dorf and His Wife - Segment Three ===
Dorf is sitting alone in his boat. His wife tells him to come back to shore; she had caught 63 fish, and Dorf has yet to catch one. The wife drives away without him, as he sits alone in the boat. The credits roll by as he calls for help from others and insults his wife.
