= The Prize Fighter =

1979 film by Michael Preece

- Theatrical release poster
- Directed by: Michael Preece
- Screenplay by: Tim Conway; John Myhers
- Story by: Tim Conway
- Produced by: Lang Elliott; Wanda Dell
- Starring: Tim Conway; Don Knotts; David Wayne
- Cinematography: Jacques Haitkin
- Edited by: Fabien Tordjmann
- Music by: Peter Matz
- Production company: Tri Star Pictures
- Distributed by: New World Pictures
- Release date: November 16, 1979
- Running time: 99 minutes
- Country: United States
- Language: English
- Budget: $2 million
- Box office: $6.5 million

The Prize Fighter is a 1979 American comedy film starring Tim Conway and Don Knotts. Directed by Michael Preece, it was written by Tim Conway and John Myhers, based on a story by Conway. It was released by New World Pictures in November 1979.

== Plot ==
Set in the 1930s, Bags, an ex-boxer and Shake, his manager have bottomed out as fight trainers. Their latest fighter has lost and fired them. Without a home or even money for food. Bags tells Shake about getting back into the ring, despite Bags' record of 20 losses by knockout (out of 20 fights). One night, while at a carnival, Shake talks Bags into appearing at a $50 amateur fight. Unbeknownst to them, in the crowd is a local mobster known as Mr. Mike. Spotting opportunity, Mr. Mike arranges for Bags' opponent to take a dive in the round. Bags knocks the other boxer with a right hook, winning the money. Afterwards, Mr. Mike approaches Bags and Shake, introducing himself as a local businessman, and invites them to his mansion for dinner. During dinner, he explains that he would like to arrange Bags to get a shot at the Heavyweight title. His plan involves arranging Bags to fight the top three contenders for the title, then Bags will have a shot with the Heavyweight champ, known as the Butcher. Believing that Bags' right hook gives him a shot. Bags and Shake agree. What they do not know is that Mr. Mike is using both men as pawns in a plan to get his hands on an old boxing gym, so he can tear it down to redevelop the property.

== Main cast ==
- Tim Conway as "Bags"
- Don Knotts as "Shake"
- Robin Clarke as Mike
- David Wayne as Pop Morgan
- Irwin Keyes as "Flower"
- Mary Ellen O'Neill as Mama
- Michael LaGuardia as "The Butcher"
- Cisse Cameron as Polly
- George Nutting as Timmy
- John Myhers as Doyle
- Ted Henning as Jimmy

== Background ==
The two comedic actors Conway and Knotts achieved success onscreen when they were paired in several family-friendly feature films for Disney: The Apple Dumpling Gang (1975), Gus (1976), and The Apple Dumpling Gang Rides Again (1979). As boxing and wrestling movies were popular in the 1970s and '80s, choosing the subject for a slapstick comedy seemed like a good idea. Knotts and Conway would team up yet again in 1980 for The Private Eyes.

== Reception ==
The film earned $6.5 million during its initial release and was one of the most financially successful films ever released by New World Pictures, having earned more than twice the cost of its production.
