= Tim Conway =

American actor and comedian (1933–2019)

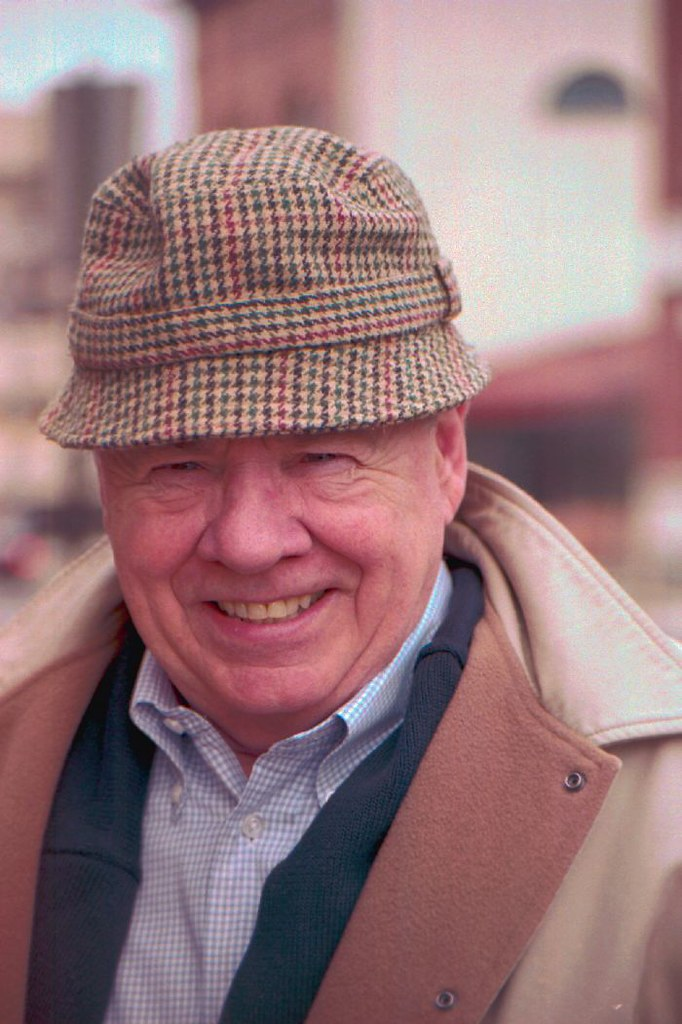
- Born: Thomas Daniel Conway; December 15, 1933; Willoughby, Ohio, US
- Died: May 14, 2019 (aged 85); Los Angeles, California, US
- Resting place: Westwood Village Memorial Park, Westwood, California, US
- Other names: Tim Daniel Conway; Thomas Conway; Toma Daniel Conway^{1}
- Education: Bowling Green State University
- Occupations: Actor; comedian; writer; director
- Years active: 1956–2016
- Spouses: Mary Anne Dalton (m. 1961; div. 1978); Charlene Fusco Del Sardo Beatty (m. 1984)
- Children: 7

Thomas Daniel "Tim" Conway (December 15, 1933 – May 14, 2019) was an American comedian, actor, writer, and director. He was a regular cast member (1975–1978) on the TV comedy-variety series The Carol Burnett Show where he portrayed his recurrent iconic characters Mister Tudball and the Oldest Man. Conway was notable for his physical comedy. Over his career he received numerous accolades, including five Primetime Emmy Awards and a Golden Globe Award. He received a star on the Hollywood Walk of Fame in 1999 and was inducted into the Television Hall of Fame in 2002.

Conway started his career in local television in Cleveland as Ernie Anderson's collaborator. He gained national exposure on The Steve Allen Show, The Garry Moore Show and The Mike Douglas Show and then wider recognition for his role as the inept Ensign Parker in the World War II TV situation comedy McHale's Navy from 1962 to 1966. The role garnered him a nomination for the Primetime Emmy Award for Outstanding Supporting Actor in a Comedy Series. Conway starred on The Carol Burnett Show, where he was admired for his ability to depart from scripts with humorous ad libs and gestures, which frequently caused others in the skit to break character with laughter.

Conway helmed his own series twice, The Tim Conway Comedy Hour (1970) and The Tim Conway Show (1980–1981). He also co-starred with Don Knotts in several films including The Apple Dumpling Gang (1975), its 1979 sequel, Gus (1976), and The Private Eyes (1980). He played Dorf in eight films from 1987 to 1996, and voiced Barnacle Boy in SpongeBob SquarePants (1999–2012). He received two Primetime Emmy Awards for Outstanding Guest Actor in a Comedy Series for his roles in the ABC comedy series Coach in 1996 and the NBC sitcom 30 Rock in 2008.

== Early life and education ==
Conway was born Thomas Daniel Conway^{1} on December 15, 1933, in Willoughby, Ohio, a suburb of Cleveland, and grew up in nearby Chagrin Falls, the son of Daniel and Sophia (née Murgoiu) Conway. Daniel was a groomer for polo ponies. His father, who immigrated to the United States in 1927, was born in Ireland to Scottish parents, and his mother was a first-generation Romanian-American.

Conway's legal name was Thomas, though he was also referred to as Toma, the Romanian-language analog,^{1} and was typically known as Tom; he changed his stage name to Tim near the beginning of his acting career (quipping he "dotted the O") to avoid confusion with British actor Tom Conway.

Conway attended Bowling Green State University in Bowling Green, Ohio, where he majored in television and radio and was a disc jockey, and he was a member of the Phi Delta Theta fraternity. When he graduated, Conway enlisted in the United States Army, where he served between 1956 and 1958.

== Career ==
=== 1960–1966: Rise to prominence ===
After his discharge from the Army, Conway returned to Cleveland and worked with Ernie Anderson on KYW-TV, an NBC affiliate, in 1958 and 1959. Early on, Conway and Anderson acted in TV commercials that built on their quirky brand of humor to supplement their income.

From 1960 to 1962, Conway was on WJW-TV (then a CBS affiliate, now a Fox affiliate) on a weekday morning film show (under the Ernie's Place banner), where he also wrote material for the comedic skits shown during film intermissions. Conway also recorded a comedy album with Anderson, who gained national prominence as a voice-over announcer for ABC Television beginning in the 1970s.

WJW-TV dismissed Conway in 1962, in part because he (and Anderson) misled station management into thinking he had experience as a director. Because of this move, which deprived Anderson of his co-host and comic foil, the station asked Anderson if he could host a B-grade (and lower) horror film show on Friday nights instead. Conway continued to make many appearances alongside Anderson's alter ego Ghoulardi, in addition to "Big Chuck" Schodowski, a station engineer who Anderson got to assume much of Conway's sidekick status (and who ultimately succeeded Anderson as co-host of the horror film program).

After he became famous, Conway resurfaced periodically on Cleveland television on the Hoolihan and Big Chuck and Big Chuck and Lil' John shows on WJW-TV, in guest spots and occasional skits. Conway also made regular guest appearances at numerous "Ghoulardifest" functions held by WJW over the years, along with former Cleveland TV personality Bob "Hoolihan" Wells, in tribute to Anderson, who died in 1997.

Comedic actress Rose Marie visited WJW in 1961, as part of CBS's promotional practice of sending their major show stars directly to local affiliates: in this case, it was for The Dick Van Dyke Show. She viewed tapes of some of Anderson and Conway's skits and proceeded to take Conway under her wing. Following his departure from WJW, Conway moved to New York City, where, with Rose Marie's assistance, he auditioned for, and gained a spot on, ABC's The Steve Allen Show as a regular player. During this time he also appeared on The Garry Moore Show and The Mike Douglas Show, and That's Life.

McHale's Navy

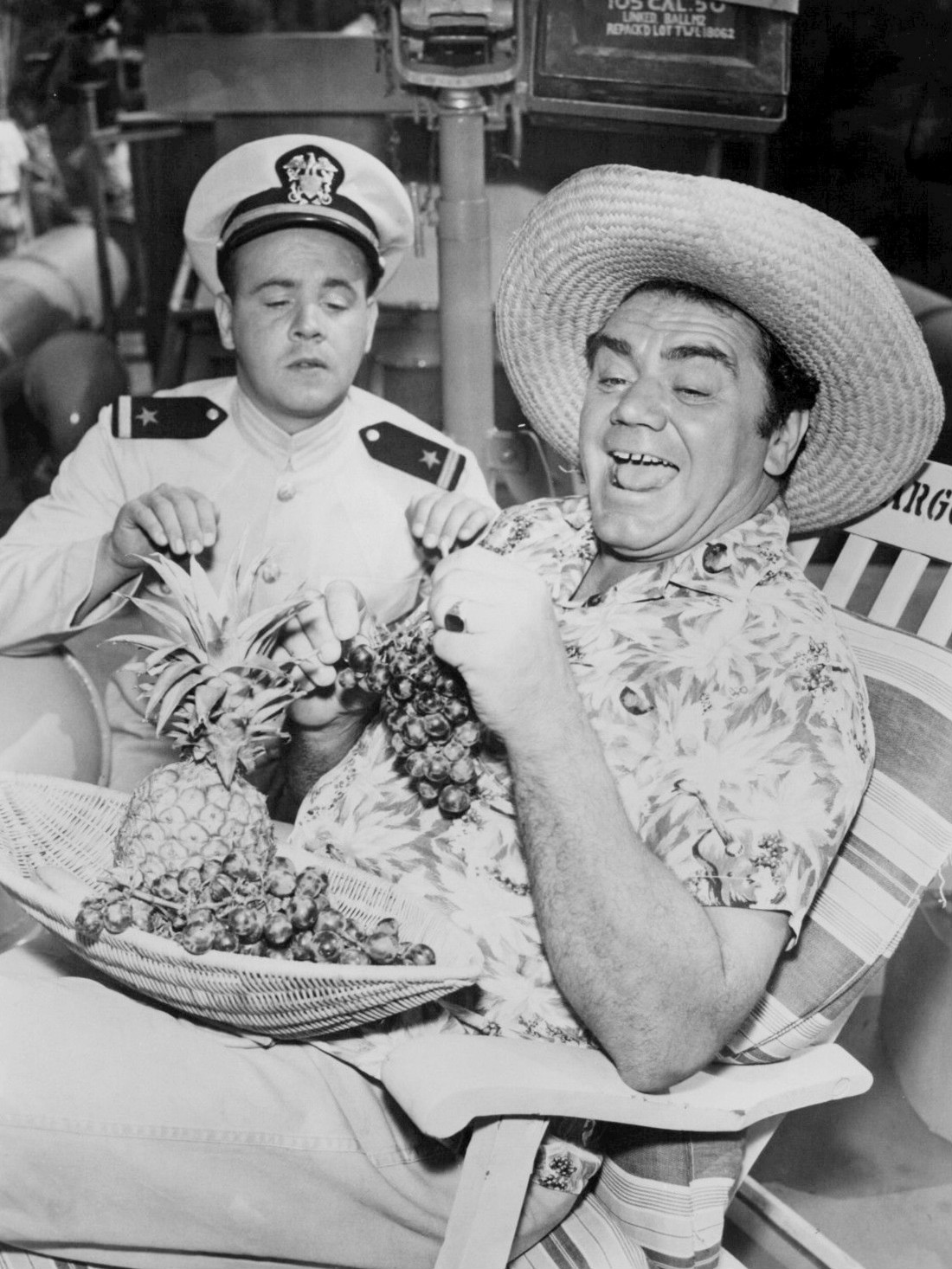
Conway and Ernest Borgnine in a photograph of McHale's Navy, 1962

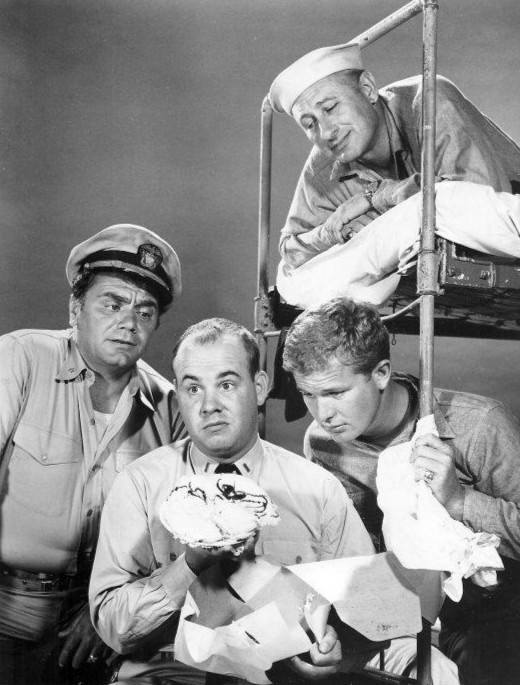
Borgnine, Conway, Gary Vinson, and Carl Ballantine (in top bunk) in McHale's Navy in 1962

Conway gained a national following from his role as the bumbling, naive Ensign Charles Parker, Executive Officer of the World War II PT-73, in the 1960s sitcom McHale's Navy, alongside Ernest Borgnine and Joe Flynn. Borgnine became a mentor and a good friend. Conway appeared at Borgnine's 90th birthday celebration and, four years later, paid tribute to his friend at the 7th Annual Screen Actors Guild Awards on TNT.

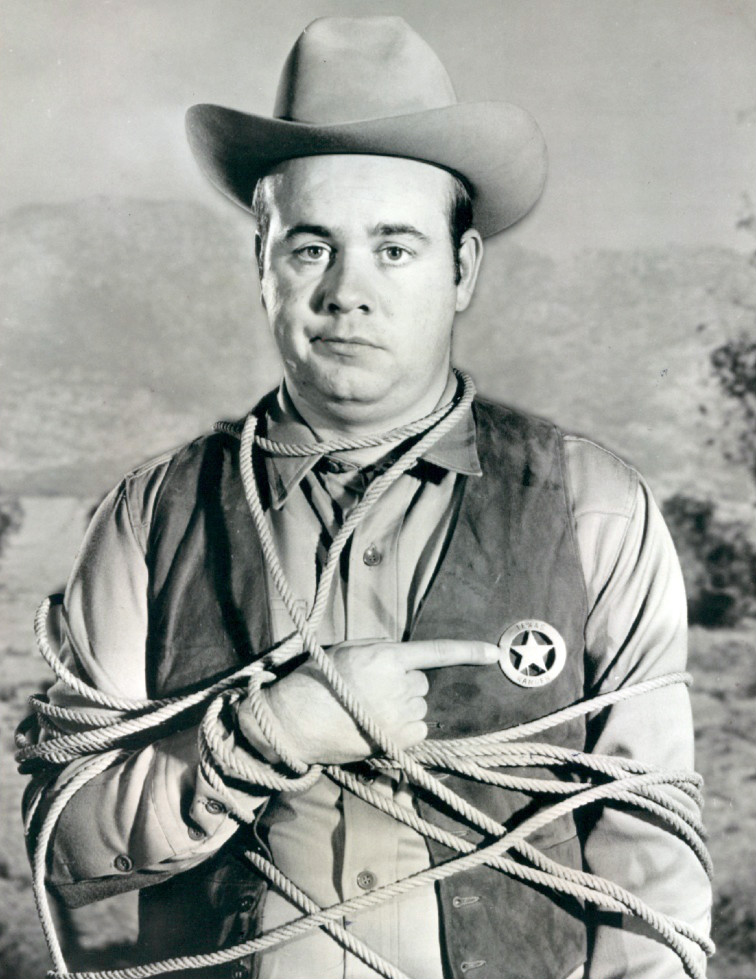
Conway in a publicity photo for Rango, 1966

Afterwards, he starred in a string of short-lived television series, starting with 1967's Rango which starred Conway as an incompetent Texas Ranger. Conway was part of an infamous network TV programming catastrophe, Turn-On, a counter-cultural sketch comedy show on ABC that was derided as a rip-off of NBC's Rowan & Martin's Laugh-In. The show was in fact created and directed by Laugh-In's creator George Schlatter. Even though Conway was listed only as a guest star on the pilot, which ABC broadcast on February 5, 1969, it was the only episode that ever aired.

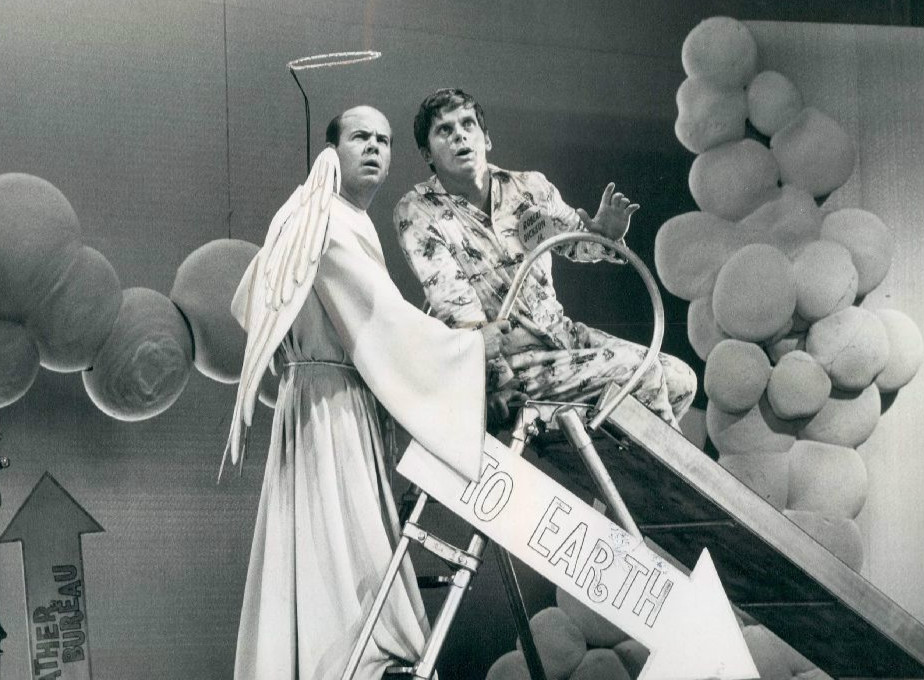
Conway as an angel with Robert Morse on That's Life, 1968

In 1963, Conway guest-starred in Channing playing a job applicant. In 1968, he made two guest appearances on That's Life. From 1970 to 1971, Conway made four appearances on Rowan & Martin's Laugh-In.

Turn-On received enough immediate, negative reaction to force several ABC affiliates, including WEWS-TV in Conway's hometown of Cleveland, to refuse to return to the program after the first commercial break. WEWS management also sent an angrily worded telegram to the network's headquarters. Many West Coast affiliates received advance warning and refused to air the show. Conway remarked that the show's premiere party he attended was also the program's cancellation party, but ABC did not officially cancel the program until February 9.

=== 1967–1978: The Carol Burnett Show ===
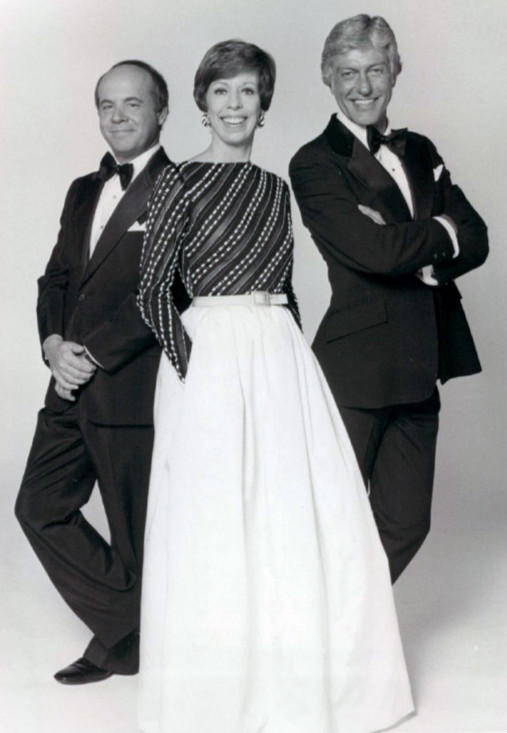
(L to R): Conway, Carol Burnett, and Dick Van Dyke in the final season

Starting with the 1975–76 season, Conway became a regular on The Carol Burnett Show (replacing Lyle Waggoner), after having been a frequent guest for the show's first eight seasons. Conway's work on the show earned him four Emmy Awards — one for writing and three for performance, one of which was before he became a regular. Two of Conway's memorable characters on the Burnett Show were The Oldest Man, whose shaggy white hair, slow speech, and shuffling gait ran counter to the much-needed energy levels of the various occupations in which he was usually found, and Mr. Tudball, a businessman whose intentions of running a "ship-shape" office were usually sunk by the bored indifference of his secretary, Mrs. Wiggins (Burnett). Although the character was widely thought to be Swedish, Conway used a Romanian accent learned from his mother.

Conway often made his co-stars on The Carol Burnett Show break character and laugh in the middle of a scene, usually without speaking a line of dialogue. According to Burnett, the characters breaking and laughing did not happen as often as many people later remembered, but because the laughter was real and added even more comedic value to a scene, those breaks became a defining characteristic of the show.

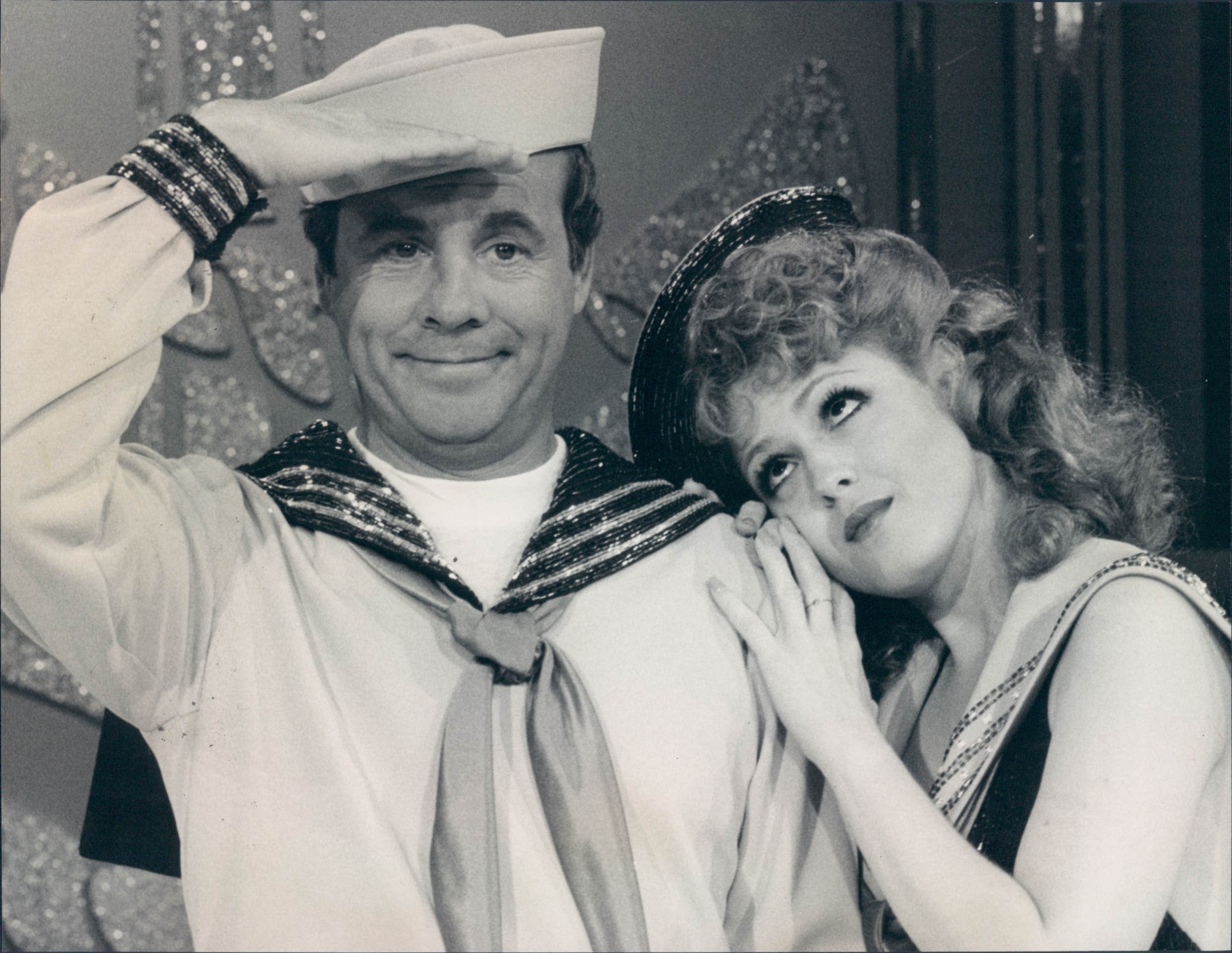
Conway with Bernadette Peters in a skit

A prime example of his ability to make his co-stars laugh uncontrollably involved Lyle Waggoner as a captured American airman, with Conway as a stereotypical blond-haired Gestapo agent charged with his interrogation. Stating that "the Fuhrer" had taken particular interest, Conway produced a small Hitler hand puppet. Conway suggested to the puppet that singing might relax Waggoner's character to the point he is willing to talk. In a long, drawn-out fashion, the Hitler puppet (Conway providing a falsetto voice, with German accent) sings "I've Been Working on the Railroad," and with each passing verse, Waggoner loses more of his composure, finally laughing hysterically when puppet-Hitler screeches, "FEE-FI-Fiddely-I-O!".

Another example of his ability to make his co-stars break up in laughter is exemplified in the "Elephant Story" outtake from one of the "Family" sketches. Conway tells an increasingly absurd story about his visit to the circus; as he continues, the other cast members (Carol Burnett, Vicki Lawrence, and Dick Van Dyke) are soon having trouble staying in character, looking away from him and the cameras. Conway eventually finishes his story, and Lawrence (in character as Mama) replies: "Are you sure that little asshole's through?", causing the others – even Conway – to break out in hysterical laughter. Conway remained a regular cast member of The Carol Burnett Show until the program's run ended in 1978.

=== 1970–1989: Established work ===
The Tim Conway Show (1970)

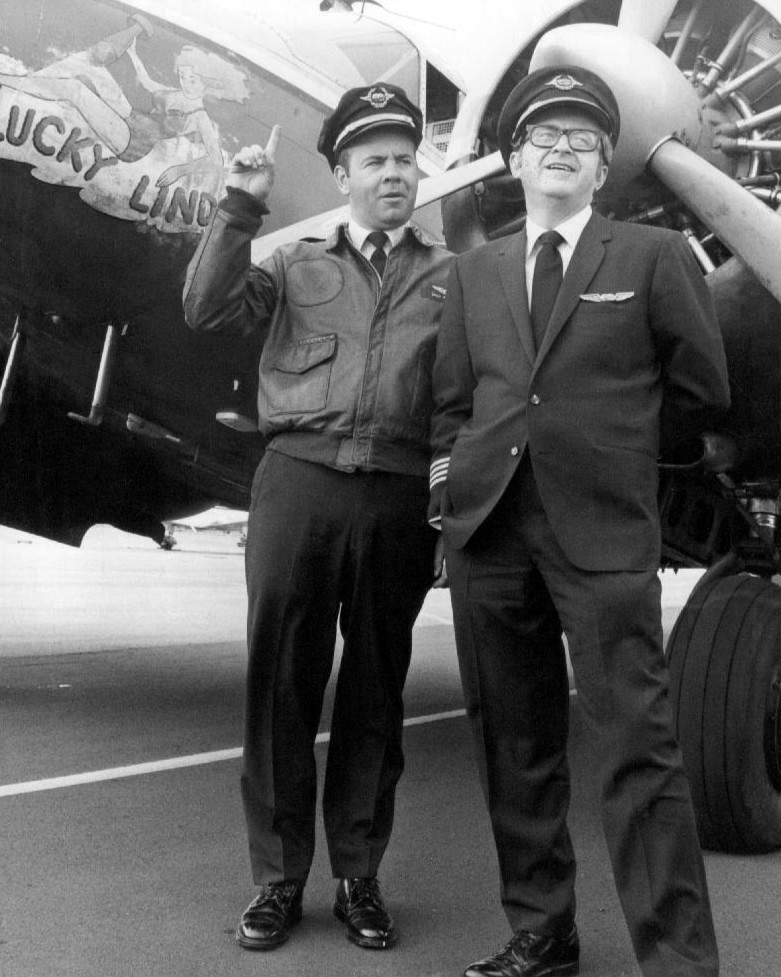
Conway and Joe Flynn pose in front of Lucky Linda in a publicity photo for The Tim Conway Show taken on January 9, 1970

In 1970, The Tim Conway Show paired Conway with Joe Flynn of McHale's Navy in a sitcom as owner-pilots of a one-plane (a Beechcraft Model 18 named Lucky Linda) airline operated by the duo. Having "nowhere to run", this pressurized situation was ideal for the fast repartee of the lead actors. It debuted in January 1970 and the last new show aired in June 1970. In the fall of the same year, Conway was given his own hour-long variety show, The Tim Conway Comedy Hour, or The Tim Conway Comedy House, which, as his other series had, folded quickly, lasting only 13 weeks. Typical of his self-effacing humor, he ordered his car's license plate to reflect the short duration of the series: "13 WKS". (Conway was given another one-hour variety show ten years later, which revived the title The Tim Conway Show.)

In 1973, Conway guest-starred in The New Scooby Doo Movies, voiced himself in the episode "The Spirited Spooked Sports Show". In 1974, he was in the ABC Afterschool Special as a janitor in the episode: "The Crazy Comedy Concert". In 1987, Conway guest-starred in Faerie Tale Theatre as a mayoral candidate in the episode: "Rip Van Winkle". Beginning in 1975, Conway was often paired with Don Knotts in family films from Disney, including The Apple Dumpling Gang and its 1979 sequel, The Apple Dumpling Gang Rides Again. They also starred in two independent films, a boxing comedy called The Prize Fighter in 1979, and a 1980 mystery comedy film called The Private Eyes.

The Tim Conway Show (1980–1981)

In 1980, Conway again was given his own one-hour variety program, titled The Tim Conway Show (the title that was previously used for his 1970 sitcom). It aired on CBS, as his previous shows had, and debuted on March 22, 1980. It was originally a full hour but was reduced to half an hour in summer 1980. It lasted longer than any of his earlier self-titled series, ending in August 1981. The format was similar to that of The Carol Burnett Show, with several regular cast members performing in comedy sketches, interspersed with the occasional musical performance by a guest musician. Among the regulars in the cast were Maggie Roswell, Miriam Flynn, Eric Boardman, Jack Riley, and Dick Orkin. Former Burnett cast member Harvey Korman also became a Tim Conway Show regular in late 1980, after having earlier made guest appearances on the show, as had Carol Burnett and Vicki Lawrence.

In the spring of 1983, Conway starred in another situation comedy, Ace Crawford, Private Eye; a spoof of detective shows, it lasted only a month. In the summer of 1990, he starred in Tim Conway's Funny America, playing pranks in disguise on unsuspecting passersby around the United States while hidden cameras recorded the results, which Conway presented to a studio audience; it, too, lasted only a few weeks.

Dorf

In the 1980s, Conway began appearing in a series of satirical how-to videos in which he played a diminutive, dark-haired Scandinavian known as Dorf (a variation on "dwarf"), reprising his goofy Mr. Tudball accent. The Dorf character first appeared on the January 3, 1986, episode of The Tonight Show Starring Johnny Carson. In that episode, he portrayed a horse jockey. Dorf also appeared in the 1987 film Dorf on Golf and later appeared in eight other films on a variety of sports from baseball to auto racing. Dorf on Golf was remastered for DVD in 2007. In 2010, all of the Dorf films were remastered in a DVD Collection featuring all eight films, a behind-the-scenes with Dorf, and a commentary track by Tim Conway on "The Legend of the Paddle: The Oldie Hollis Story." Dorf also appeared on an episode of Tim Conway's Funny America in the summer of 1990, leading an aerobics class on his impossibly short legs. In 2009, Conway's Dorf character started "helping" Santa Claus on the website iSpotSanta. Each year, Dorf had three sketches; in 2009, he tried to give Santa his Christmas list, failing and accidentally hitting Santa with a golf ball. Then, in 2010, he tried to give all of the world's letters to Santa directly using jet rockets to fly to his sleigh, cannonballs, and more.

Conway starred in Disney films such as The World's Greatest Athlete (1973), The Apple Dumpling Gang (1975), Gus (1976), and The Apple Dumpling Gang Rides Again (1979), his work with the company earning him a Disney Legend award in 2004. He starred in the 1977 comedy film The Billion Dollar Hobo. Conway also co-starred with Don Knotts in The Prize Fighter (1979) and The Private Eyes (1980). He starred in the 1986 equestrian comedy, The Longshot. Conway also appeared with Dick Martin in Air Bud: Golden Receiver (1998) as Fred Davis, the main announcer for the Timberwolves' final game, with Martin as his co-announcer, Phil Phil. He was postal employee Herman Dooly in the 1996 film, Dear God.

=== 1990–2016: Voice work and resurgence ===
In 1990, he guest-starred in Newhart as himself in the episode: "Dick and Tim". In 1991, Conway made a cameo appearance in Carol & Company as an audience member in the episode "That Little Extra Something". From 1995 to 1996, he guest-starred in Married... with Children as Ephraim Wanker, the hillbilly father of Peg Bundy in four episodes. In 1996 and 1997, Conway guest-starred in ABC's Coach, for which he received the Primetime Emmy Award for Outstanding Guest Actor in a Comedy Series, playing Kenny Montague in the 1996 episode "The Gardener." In 1997, Conway guest-starred in Diagnosis: Murder as Tim Conrad in the episode: "Comedy Is Murder" where he teamed back up with Dick Van Dyke and Harvey Korman where Conway and Korman (Harvey Huckaby) are former comedy partners. In the episode, a clip of the well-known dentist sketch from The Carol Burnett Show was used to illustrate their partnership. In 1998, Conway guest-starred in Ellen as a comedian in the episode: "Ellen: A Hollywood Tribute, Part 1".

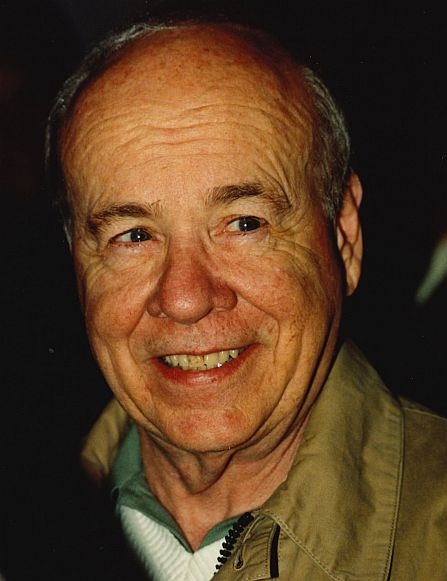
Conway in 2002

In 1999, Conway and his good friend Ernest Borgnine reunited to become the first guest stars of Nickelodeon's SpongeBob SquarePants, voicing the roles of Mermaid Man and Barnacle Boy. Series creator Stephen Hillenburg and creative director Derek Drymon visioned the voices of the characters with the two actors in mind from the very beginning, having been fans of their work in McHale's Navy. Hillenberg and Drymon directly approached Borgnine and Conway, and the actors both accepted. Conway lent his voice to other television shows including The Simpsons, the Disney spin-off Hercules, Lloyd in Space, The Wild Thornberrys, Cybill, The Proud Family, The New Scooby-Doo Movies, WordGirl, Scooby-Doo! Pirates Ahoy!, Caillou and What's with Andy?. He also narrated The Secret Shortcut in Reading Rainbow and hosted The Flintstones' 25th Anniversary Celebration. He also provided the voice of Freddy the Frog in the direct-to-DVD film Garfield's Fun Fest. From 2003 to 2010, Conway starred as Hermie in Max Lucado's animated video series, Hermie and Friends alongside his co-star, Don Knotts as Wormie. His final voice acting role was one of the talking seagulls in The SpongeBob Movie: Sponge Out of Water. In 1999, he guest-starred again in Diagnosis: Murder as Tim Conrad in the episode: "The Roast". From 2001 to 2005, Conway guest-starred in Yes Dear as Tom Warner, the father of Greg, with Carol Burnett Show co-star Vicki Lawrence playing his wife.

Conway and Harvey Korman created a Collector's Edition DVD of new comedy sketches, titled Together Again; it was produced by Pasquale Murena and sold through Conway's official website. Starting in 2003, Conway teamed up with good friend Don Knotts again to provide voices for the direct-to-video children's series Hermie and Friends, which continued with both until Knotts died in 2006. Conway continued to do the series afterwards. In 2007, he hosted Thou Shalt Laugh 2: The Deuce, a collection of Christian stand-up comedians. In 2012–13, he voiced the character Mulch in DreamWorks' DreamWorks Dragons subtitled Riders of Berk series. In 2016, he played Professor VanVanguard, a knowledgeable character of the lives, characteristics and treating of zombies in the award-winning feature film Chip & Bernie's Zomance.

On his 75th birthday in 2008, Conway was interviewed as a guest on The Bonnie Hunt Show and given a surprise cake by Bob Newhart. He won another Emmy Award for Outstanding Guest Actor in a Comedy Series for his role as Bucky Bright in the 30 Rock episode "Subway Hero," which initially aired on April 17, 2008. From 2010 to 2014, Conway guest-starred on CSI: Crime Scene Investigation, Hot in Cleveland, WordGirl, Batman: The Brave and the Bold, Wizards of Waverly Place, Mike & Molly, Major Crimes, Two and a Half Men, and Glee. In 2018, Conway was seen promoting The Carol Burnett Show and other classic television series on the MeTV television network.

== Collaborators ==
Conway collaborated with many notable performers and maintained long-term professional relationships with many of them.

=== Ernie Anderson ===
Conway first pitched the idea of Ernie Anderson and himself doing a late night show together in Cleveland during the 1960s. That is where Rose Marie found Conway and got him a role on The Steve Allen Show. Before that, the duo recorded two comedy albums together: Are We On? (1966) and Bull (1967). Anderson turned to doing voiceovers after Conway moved on, but their collaborations continued with Conway's string of shows and Anderson's career as "The Voice of ABC". Anderson performed on sketches and was the voiceover talent for The Carol Burnett Show.

Anderson became a cult icon in Cleveland as the character Ghoulardi during his own late night television show, where he showed horror B movies to viewers. In 2013, Conway went to the Ghoulardi Fest to promote his book and show his love for his friend Anderson.

=== Harvey Korman ===
Conway first met Harvey Korman in 1966 during the first of Conway's three appearances on The Danny Kaye Show. Korman was a four-year series regular on Kaye's CBS variety hour. 1967 saw the end of the Kaye show and the debut of The Carol Burnett Show. With Korman available, he stepped into a regular role there. Conway appeared as a guest during that first Burnett season and the two men immediately became friends starting a lifetime of working together until Korman's death in 2008. One of their most famous sketches was from The Carol Burnett Show called "The Dentist Sketch." In this sketch, Korman goes to the just-graduated dentist Conway for a toothache. Conway proceeds to remove Korman's tooth, but before he can inject the novocaine into Korman, he injects it into himself, causing his hand, leg, and head to go numb.

Korman and Conway performed together for 10 years on The Carol Burnett Show before Korman left to pursue his own show. Korman joined Conway on Conway's shows and then later on in the 1986 film The Longshot, which Conway wrote for the two men. Conway also wrote the direct-to-video films Tim and Harvey in The Great Outdoors and Together Again with Tim and Harvey, which the comedy pair starred in together. The duo also toured the US performing together. The DVD Together Again with Tim and Harvey is a recording of their touring stage show that ran over 10 years to sold out markets until Korman's death in 2008. When interviewed in 2004, Conway said of Korman, "We're friends; He's a bright guy; he can do The New York Times crossword puzzle in about five minutes, but he can't tie his shoes."

=== Don Knotts ===
When Conway was starting his career in Hollywood, so was Don Knotts. Both men were regulars on The Steve Allen Show, though at different times. They didn't have the chance to work together until Disney Studios paired the two men on the Apple Dumpling Gang series of films, and their comedy clicked; Knotts's boisterous, Barney Fife-style bungling both contrasted and meshed with Conway's quieter form of physical comedy. The first film starred Bill Bixby and Susan Clark in 1975 and was called The Apple Dumpling Gang. In it, Bixby is tricked into taking care of a trio of orphans as a pair of lovable holdup men named Amos Tucker (Conway) and Theodore Ogelvie (Knotts) attempts to steal a gold nugget the children find. The film was a commercial success and a sequel, starring the pair, was made in 1979, called The Apple Dumpling Gang Rides Again. The sequel did not have the other cast members but was hugely profitable for Disney.

Conway wrote two other films for the pair to star in together starting with The Prize Fighter in 1979 and The Private Eyes in 1980. Both were independently produced and the highest grossing independent films of those years. They had a cameo in the Cannonball Run II film together and in later years voiced the characters of Hermie and Wormie the caterpillars in numerous shows from Max Lucado's Christian children's series, "Hermie and Friends".

=== Pasquale Murena ===
In 2007, Conway met filmmaker Pasquale Murena when Murena was brought in to direct additional scenes and edit the direct-to-DVD film Legend of the Paddle, starring Conway. The two men subsequently worked together on numerous productions, including Murena producing the DVD releases of Together Again with Tim and Harvey, the re-releases of Tim and Harvey in The Great Outdoors, Dorf on Golf, and Dorf Goes Fishing. Murena directed, produced and co-wrote with Conway six Dorf comedy sketches for the DVD release of The Ultimate Dorf DVD Collection, which has sold over 3 million copies.

Starting in 2009, the two men collaborated on their first sketches for the website iSpotSanta, where Dorf helps Santa deliver presents, and works at the North Pole as Santa's No. 1 elf. The two men did over 25 comedy sketches and three short films for the website, while garnering over 35 million viewers. Conway was quoted in an interview on the Disney Channel, stating that, "Pasquale has done more with Dorf than I ever imagined. We love making these films for kids." Continuing their success, Murena cast Conway as Professor VanVanGuard in his award-winning first feature film in 2014 called, Chip & Bernie's Zomance, with Conway adding his unique humor to this zombie film.

== Personal life ==
=== Family ===
Conway was married to Mary Anne Dalton from 1961 until 1978, and they had six children together. He was married to Charlene Fusco from May 18, 1984, until his death. Her daughter, Jacqueline "Jackie" Beatty, became Tim's stepdaughter, giving him seven children altogether.

=== Autobiography ===
Conway's memoir What's So Funny?: My Hilarious Life was on The New York Times Best Seller list its first week on sale.

=== Religion ===
Tony Rossi interviewed Conway on November 20, 2013, on his podcast Christopher Closeup (on Patheos), and Conway revealed that he had returned to Catholicism, the faith he was born into. This was also reported in an interview with Raymond Arroyo on his EWTN program The World Over.

=== Philanthropy ===
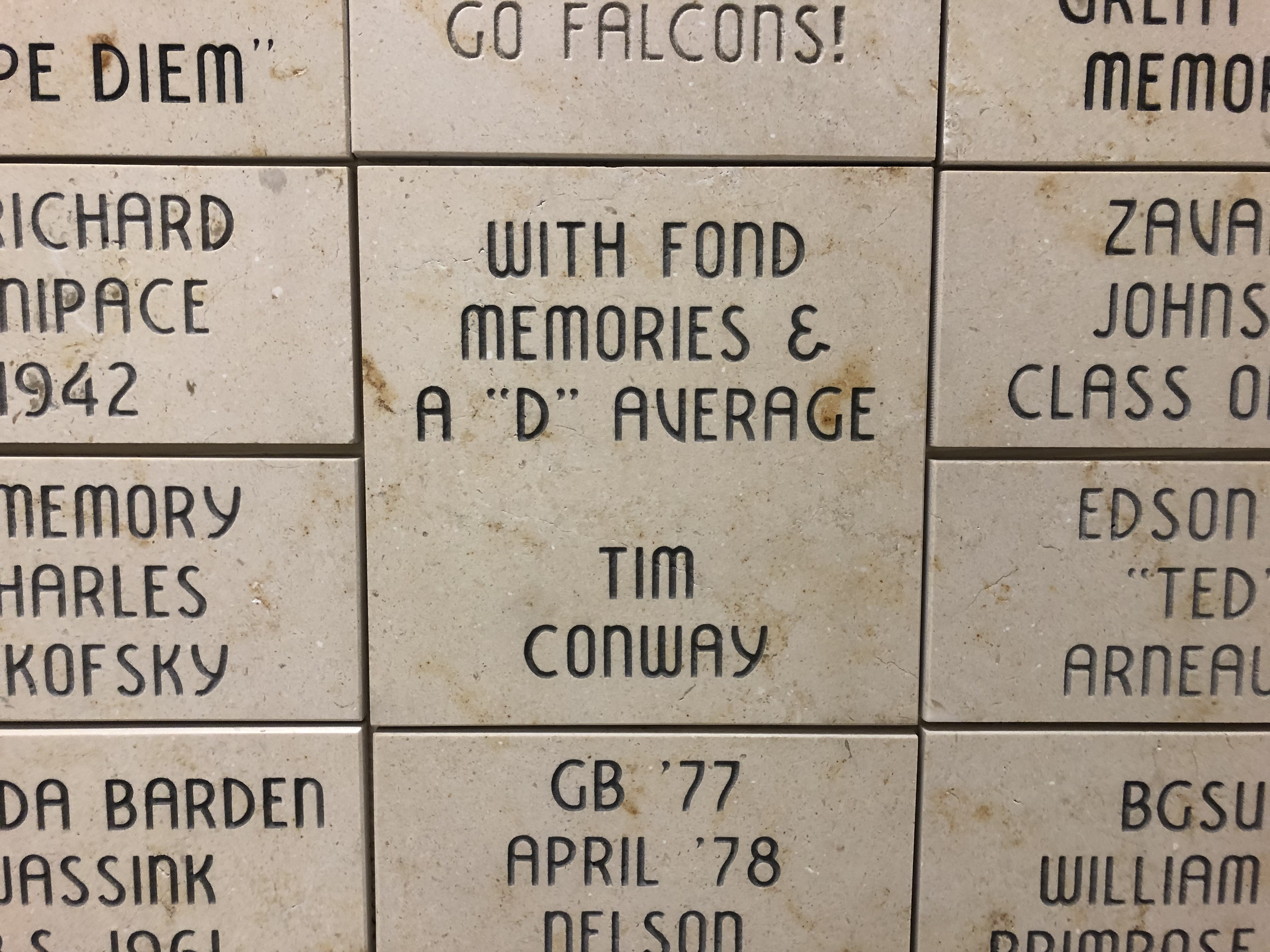
A brick sponsored by Tim Conway in the Student Union at Bowling Green State University.

In June 2010, Conway returned to his hometown of Chagrin Falls, Ohio, to put on fund-raising performances at the Chagrin Valley Little Theatre to kick off its capital campaign.

He was a spokesperson for the United Leukodystrophy Foundation.

=== Interests ===
A fan of thoroughbred horse racing and an occasional racehorse owner, Conway was the co-founder and vice-president of the board of directors of the Don MacBeth Memorial Jockey Fund.

== Illness and death ==
In September 2018, SpongeBob SquarePants executive producer Vincent Waller commented that during the time Conway was recording dialogue for the seagull in The SpongeBob Movie: Sponge Out of Water (which was released in 2015), he was having trouble recording due to health issues. These issues led to his complete retirement from acting in 2016; he had previously retired from playing Barnacle Boy in 2012, following his and Mermaid Man's retirement due to Ernest Borgnine's death.

In 2018, Conway was diagnosed with dementia due to normal pressure hydrocephalus. He had surgery to have a ventricular shunt placed. His daughter Kelly and his wife Char each wanted sole conservatorship over his health, and a suit was filed at the Superior Court of Los Angeles. Kelly wanted him to be in his home, not in a facility, for privacy reasons. Judge Robert Wada ruled against Kelly, and in March 2019 his wife was appointed as his conservator.

Conway died on May 14, 2019, at the age of 85 from complications of normal pressure hydrocephalus at a care facility in Los Angeles. He is entombed in a crypt at Pierce Brothers Westwood Village Memorial Park and Mortuary within its Sanctuary of Prayer Mausoleum.

=== Tributes ===
Numerous actors and celebrities paid tribute to Conway following his death, including Dick Van Dyke, Patton Oswalt, Ben Stiller, Billy Gardell, Ed Asner, Buzz Aldrin, Neil Patrick Harris, Tom Kenny, Jamie Lee Curtis, Larry King, Judd Apatow, Wayne Brady, Marlee Matlin, Al Jean, John Scalzi, Richard Lewis, Marsha Warfield, Patricia Heaton, Tony Hale, Larry Wilmore, Vicki Lawrence, Yvette Nicole Brown, Andy Richter, and Conan O'Brien.

Close friend Bob Newhart made the following statement:

"We lost one of the greatest today – Tim Conway may be the greatest ever. I will never forget on an Emmy Awards when Harvey Korman won and Tim did not. Harvey went up to accept his award, Tim went up and stood right next to him, not saying a word. Ginnie and I will miss him greatly."

Close friend Carol Burnett made the following statement:

"I'm heartbroken. He was one in a million, not only as a brilliant comedian but as a loving human being. I cherish the times we had together both on the screen and off. He'll be in my heart forever."

== Accolades and recognition ==
Year	Association	Category	Nominated work	Result	Ref.
1963	Primetime Emmy Award	Outstanding Supporting Actor in a Comedy Series	McHale's Navy	Nominated	
1965	Laurel Awards	New Faces, Male	McHale's Navy	Nominated	
1973	Primetime Emmy Award	Outstanding Individual Performance in a Variety or Music Program	The Carol Burnett Show	Won	
1974	Primetime Emmy Award	Outstanding Individual Performance in a Variety or Music Program	The Carol Burnett Show	Nominated	
1975	Primetime Emmy Award	Outstanding Individual Performance in a Variety or Music Program	The Carol Burnett Show	Nominated	
1976	Primetime Emmy Award	Outstanding Individual Performance in a Variety or Music Program	The Carol Burnett Show	Nominated	
1976	Golden Globe Award	Best Supporting Actor – Series, Miniseries or Television Film	The Carol Burnett Show	Won	
1977	Golden Globe Award	Best Supporting Actor – Series, Miniseries or Television Film	The Carol Burnett Show	Nominated	
1977	Primetime Emmy Award	Outstanding Writing for a Variety Series	The Carol Burnett Show	Nominated	
1977	Primetime Emmy Award	Outstanding Individual Performance in a Variety or Music Program	The Carol Burnett Show	Won	
1978	Primetime Emmy Award	Outstanding Writing for a Variety Series	The Carol Burnett Show	Nominated	
1978	Primetime Emmy Award	Outstanding Writing for a Variety Series	The Carol Burnett Show	Won	
1978	Primetime Emmy Award	Outstanding Individual Performance in a Variety or Music Program	The Carol Burnett Show	Nominated	
1978	Writers Guild of America Award	Outstanding Variety: Series or Special: Musical or Comedy	The Carol Burnett Show	Nominated	
1979	Writers Guild of America Award	Variety Script, Musical or Comedy^{5}	The Carol Burnett Show	Nominated	
1980	Primetime Emmy Award	Outstanding Writing for a Variety Series^{6}	Carol Burnett & Company	Nominated	
1996	Primetime Emmy Award	Outstanding Guest Actor in a Comedy Series	Coach: The Gardener	Won	
1997	American Comedy Awards	Funniest Supporting Actor in a Motion Picture	Dear God	Nominated	
2000	American Comedy Awards	Funniest Male Guest Appearance in a TV Series	Mad About You	Nominated	
2003	TV Land Award	Favorite Second Banana^{7}	The Carol Burnett Show	Nominated	
2005	TV Land Award	Legend Award^{8}	The Carol Burnett Show	Won	
2008	Primetime Emmy Award	Outstanding Guest Actor in a Comedy Series	30 Rock: Subway Hero	Won	
2011	Horror Host Hall of Fame	Behind The Screams	Shock Theater (Ghoulardi)	Won	

Honors

- 1989 - Hollywood Walk of Fame at 6740 Hollywood Blvd
- 2002 - Television Hall of Fame Lifetime achievement
