= Carol Burnett on screen and stage =

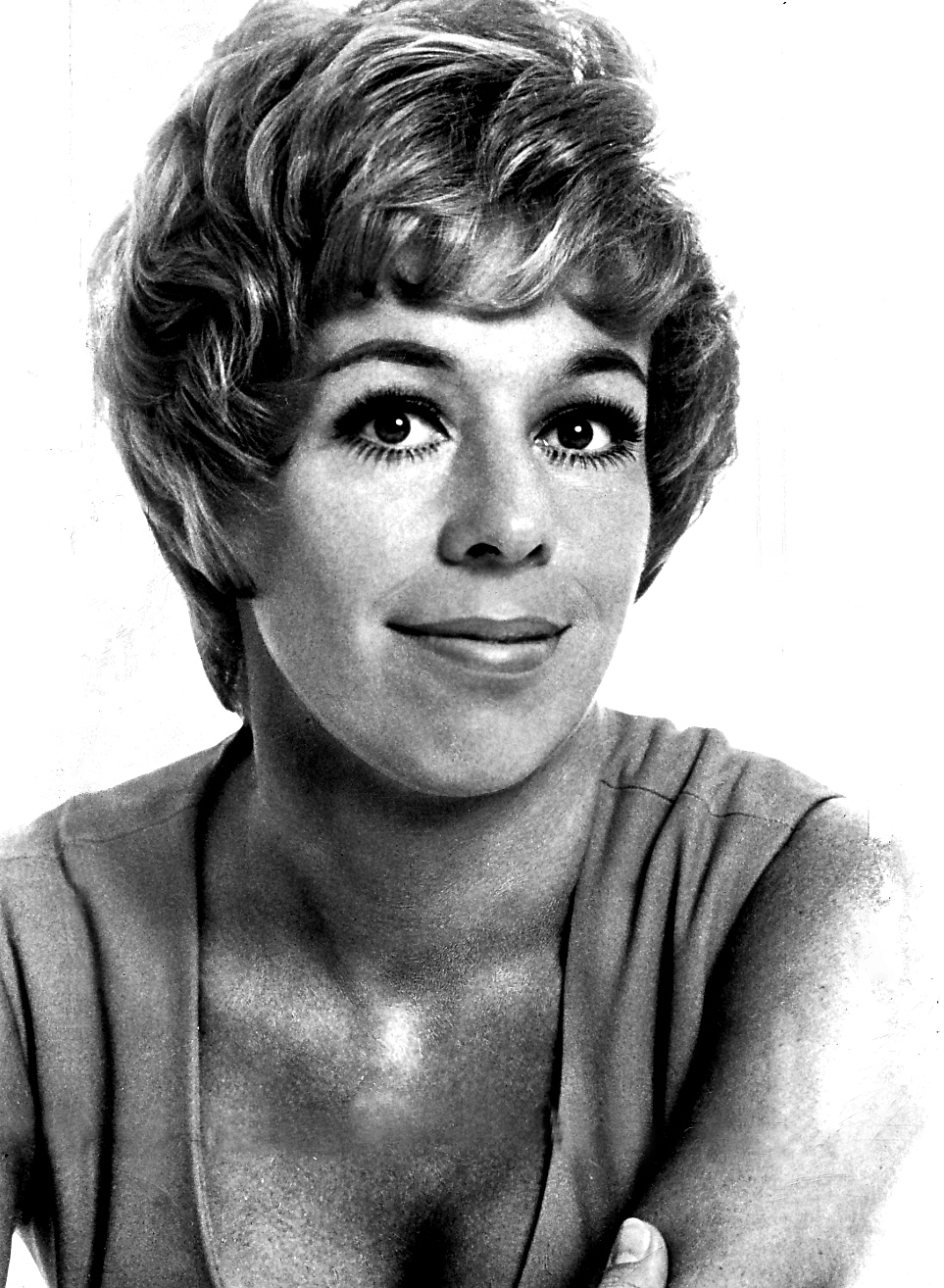
Carol Burnett in 1974

Carol Burnett is an American comedian and actress known for her performances in film, television and theater.

== Film ==
Note: TV films are listed in the Television credits section.

Year	Title	Role	Notes	Ref.
1963	Who's Been Sleeping in My Bed?	Stella Irving		
1968	Rowan & Martin at the Movies	Herself	Documentary short	
1968	Star Spangled Salesman	Miss Grebs	Documentary short	
1972	Pete 'n' Tillie	Tillie		
1974	The Front Page	Mollie Malloy		
1978	A Wedding	Tulip Brenner		
1980	HealtH	Gloria Burbank		
1981	The Four Seasons	Kate Burroughs		
1981	Chu Chu and the Philly Flash	Emily "Chu Chu" Laedecker		
1982	Annie	Miss Hannigan		
1985	Molly and the Skywalkerz: Happily Ever After	Narrator / Molly Conway (adult)	Voice; Television film for PBS, later, VHS video	
1989	Molly and the Skywalkerz: Two Daddies?	Narrator / Molly Conway (adult)	Voice; Television film for PBS, later, VHS video	
1992	Noises Off	Dotty Otley / Mrs. Clackett		
1997	Moon Over Broadway	Herself	Documentary film	
1999	Get Bruce	Herself	Documentary film	
2001	The Trumpet of the Swan	Mrs. Hammerbotham	Voice	
2003	Broadway: The Golden Age	Herself	Documentary film	
2008	Horton Hears a Who!	Kangaroo	Voice	
2009	Post Grad	Grandma Maureen		
2012	The Secret World of Arrietty	Hara	Voice	
2019	Toy Story 4	Chairol Burnett	Voice	
2020	All Together Now	Joan		
2022	Betty White: A Celebration	Herself	Documentary film	

== Television ==
Year	Title	Role	Notes
1955	The Paul Winchell Show	Guest	Episode: "Episode #6.19"
1956	Stanley	Celia	Episode: "The New Year's Party"
1956	Omnibus	Singer	Episode: "The American Musical Comedy"
1958–1964, 1966	The Garry Moore Show	Herself	Contract role
1962	Julie and Carol at Carnegie Hall	Herself	TV special
1962	The Jack Benny Program	Herself / Jane	Episode: "Jack Plays Tarzan"
1962	The Twilight Zone	Agnes Grep	Episode: "Cavender Is Coming"
1963	An Evening with Carol Burnett	Herself	TV special
1963	The Jack Benny Program	Herself / Cindy Lou Wilson	Episode: "Riverboat Sketch"
1963	Calamity Jane	Calamity Jane	Made-for-TV movie
1964	Once Upon a Mattress	Princess Winnifred	Made-for-TV movie
1964–1965	The Entertainers	Herself	7 episodes
1966–1967	The Lucy Show	Carol Bradford	4 episodes
1966	Password	Herself	Celebrity guest star
1966	Carol + 2	Herself	Variety/sketch comedy
1967	Gomer Pyle, U.S.M.C.	Corporal Carol Barnes	Episode: "Corporal Carol"
1967	Get Smart	"Ozark" Annie Jones	Episode: "One of Our Olives Is Missing"
1967	Our Place	Herself	Episode: "Carol Burnett"
1967–1978	The Carol Burnett Show	Herself / Skit characters	Variety/sketch comedy television series.
1969–1971	Here's Lucy	Herself / Carol Krausmeyer	3 episodes
1969	Gomer Pyle, U.S.M.C.	Sergeant Carol Barnes	Episode: "Showtime with Sgt. Carol"
1969–1971, 1974	Sesame Street	Herself	8 episodes
1971	Julie and Carol at Lincoln Center	Herself	TV special
1972	Once Upon a Mattress	Princess Winifred the Woebegone	Made-for-TV movie
1974	6 Rms Riv Vu	Anne Miller	Made-for-TV movie
1974	Out to Lunch	Herself	TV special directed by Bill Davis.
1975	Twigs	Emily / Celia / Dorothy / Ma	Made-for-TV movie
1976	The Sonny & Cher Show	Herself / Various Characters	2 episodes
1976	Van Dyke and Company	Herself	Episode: "Episode #1.5"
1976	Sills and Burnett at the Met	Herself	Music special
1977	Insight	Eve	Episode: "This Side of Eden"
1977	3 Girls 3	Guest	Pilot
1978	The Grass Is Always Greener over the Septic Tank	Dorothy Benson	Made-for-TV movie
1979	Dolly & Carol in Nashville	Herself/Marcy	TV special
1979	Password Plus	Herself	Celebrity Guest Star
1979	Friendly Fire	Peg Mullen	Made-for-TV movie
1979	Carol Burnett & Company	Skit characters	Variety/sketch comedy television series.
1979	The Tenth Month	Dori Grey	Made-for-TV movie
1980	The Wild Wacky Wonderful World of Winter	Stripper	HBO special
1980	The Muppet Show	Herself	Episode: "Carol Burnett"
1981, 1986–1987, 1995	Great Performances	Herself / Carlotta Campion	4 episodes
1982	Eunice	Eunice Harper Higgins	Made-for-TV movie
1982	Life of the Party: The Story of Beatrice	Beatrice O'Reilly	Made-for-TV movie
1983, 1995, 2005, 2011	All My Children	Verla Grubbs	6 episodes
1983	Between Friends	Mary Catherine Castelli	Made-for-TV movie
1983–1984	Mama's Family	Eunice Higgins	6 episodes
1984	Burnett Discovers Domingo	Herself	TV special directed
1984, 1988	Magnum, P.I.	Susan Johnson	2 episodes
1985	The Laundromat	Alberta Johnson	Made-for-TV movie
1985	Happily Ever After	Narrator	Made-for-TV movie
1986	Fresno	Charlotte Kensington	Miniseries
1987	Plaza Suite	Karen Nash / Muriel Tate / Norma Hubley	Made-for-TV movie
1987	Carol, Carl, Whoopi and Robin	Herself	Comedy special
1987	Fame	Rose	Episode: "Reggie and Rose"
1988	Hostage	Martha	Made-for-TV movie
1989	Julie & Carol: Together Again	Herself	TV special
1990–1991	Carol & Company	Skit characters	Comedy anthology series.
1991	The Carol Burnett Show	Skit characters	Variety/sketch comedy television series.
1991	The Tale of Peter Rabbit	Various	TV special
1992	The Larry Sanders Show	Herself	2 episodes
1993	The Carol Burnett Show: A Reunion	Herself	TV special directed by Dave Powers.
1994	Carol Burnett: The Special Years	Archival footage of herself	TV special
1994	Seasons of the Heart	Vivian Levinson	Made-for-TV movie
1994	Men, Movies & Carol	Herself	TV special directed by Paul Miller.
1995	Women of the House	Herself	Episode: "Women in Film"
1996–1999, 2019	Mad About You	Theresa Stemple, Jamie's mother	11 episodes
1997	Touched by an Angel	Lillian Bennett	Episode: "The Comeback"
1998	The Marriage Fool	Florence	Made-for-TV movie
2000	Putting It Together	The Wife	TV special
2001	The Carol Burnett Show: Show Stoppers	Herself	Also executive producer
2004	The Carol Burnett Show: Let's Bump Up the Lights!	Herself	Also executive producer
2005	Once Upon a Mattress	Queen Aggravain	Made-for-TV movie
2006	Desperate Housewives	Eleanor Mason	Episode: "Don't Look at Me"
2007	American Masters: Tribute to Carol Burnett	Archival footage of herself	TV special
2009	Law & Order: Special Victims Unit	Birdie Sulloway	Episode: "Ballerina"
2010, 2015	Glee	Doris Sylvester	2 episodes
2013–2014	Curious George	Great Aunt Sylvia (voice)	2 episodes
2013, 2015	Hot in Cleveland	Penny	2 episodes
2013–2014, 2016	Hawaii Five-0	Aunt Deb McGarrett	3 episodes
2014	Signed, Sealed, Delivered	Ardis Paine	Episode: "A Hope and a Future"
2017	Julie's Greenroom	Mrs. Edna Brightful	Episode: "Mash-Up: The Musical"
2017	Household Name	Vivian Valmont	TV pilot
2017	The Carol Burnett Show: 50th Anniversary Special	Herself	TV special directed by Paul Miller.
2018	A Little Help with Carol Burnett	Herself (host)	12 episodes
2018	Angie Tribeca	President Priscilla Filcox	Episode: "Air Force Two"
2019	Forky Asks a Question	Chairol Burnett	Episode: "What is Love?"
2021	Scooby-Doo and Guess Who?	Herself (voice)	Episode: "The Movieland Monsters"
2021	Trolls: Holiday in Harmony	Wind Breeze (voice)	TV special
2022	AFI Life Achievement Award: Julie Andrews	Herself	TV special
2022	Better Call Saul	Marion	4 episodes
2023	Carol Burnett: 90 Years of Laughter + Love	Herself	TV special
2024–2026	Palm Royale	Norma Dellacorte	20 episodes
2024	Frasier	Jennifer (voice)	Episode: "Thank You, Dr. Crane"
2025	Hacks	Herself	Episode: "I Love LA"

== Theatre ==
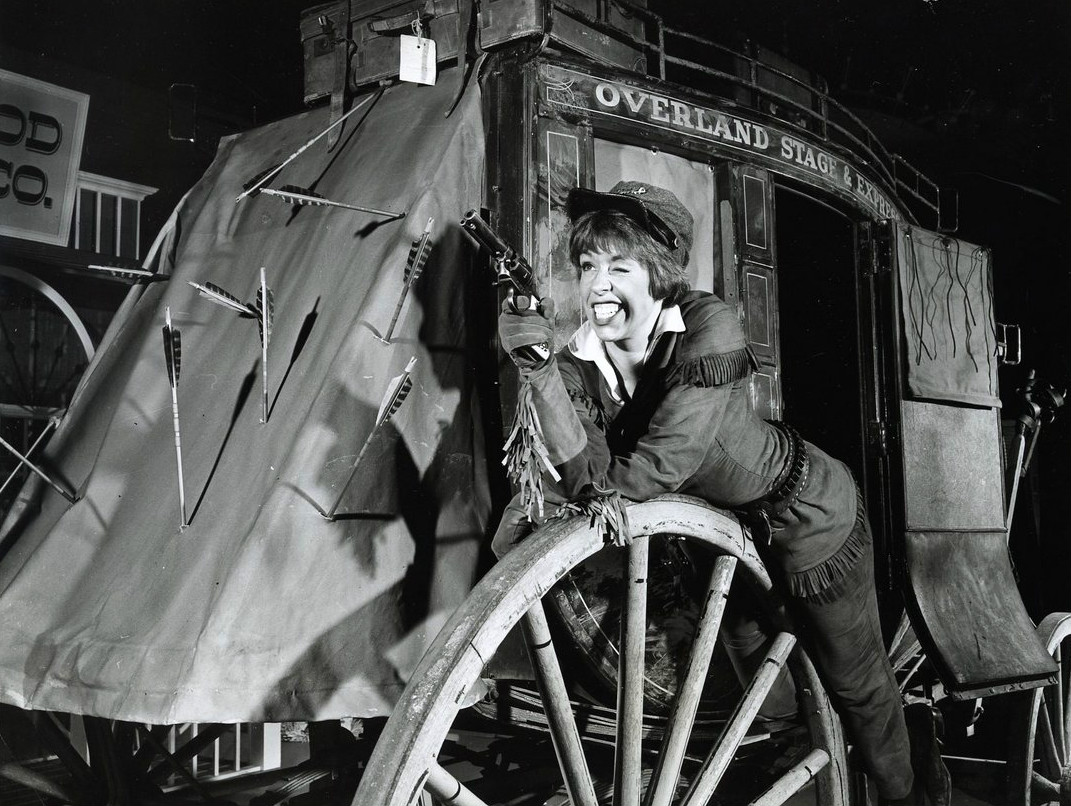
As Calamity Jane in 1963

Year	Title	Role	Theatre Venue	Notes
1959	Once Upon a Mattress	Princess Winnifred	Alvin Theatre	
1961/63	Calamity Jane	Calamity Jane	Music Hall at Fair Park	
1964	Fade Out – Fade In	Hope Springfield	Mark Hellinger Theatre	
1974	I Do! I Do!	Agnes	National tour	
1977/80	Same Time, Next Year	Doris	The Huntington Hartford Theatre	
1985	Follies	Carlotta	Avery Fisher Hall	
1990	Love Letters	Melissa Gardner	The Canon Theatre, Los Angeles	
1993	Company	Joanne	The Long Beach Civic Light Opera	
1995	Moon Over Buffalo	Charlotte Hay	Martin Beck Theatre	
1999	Putting It Together	Wife	Ethel Barrymore Theatre	
2002	Hollywood Arms	—N/a	Cort Theatre	co-playwright
2014	Love Letters	Melissa	Brooks Atkinson Theatre	
