= List of awards and nominations received by Carol Burnett =

Carol Burnett awards and nominations
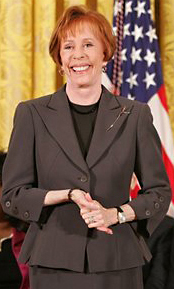
- Burnett in 2005
Awards and nominations
Award	Wins	Nominations
Critics' Choice Awards	0	1
Emmy Awards	7	23
Golden Globe Awards	5	16
Grammy Awards	1	3
Tony Awards	0	2

Totals (Note: Certain award groups do not simply award one winner. They acknowledge several different recipients, have runners-up, and have third place. Since this is a specific recognition and is different from losing an award, runner-up mentions are considered wins in this award tally. For simplification and to avoid errors, each award in this list has been presumed to have had a prior nomination.)
- Wins: 16
- Nominations: 47

Carol Burnett is an American comedian and actress known for her work in film, television and the theater. Over her career she has received numerous accolades including seven Emmy Awards, five Golden Globe Awards, a Grammy Award, and a Special Tony Award.

Burnett has received 23 Primetime Emmy Award nominations with six wins for her work for her appearances in the CBS variety series The Garry Moore Show (1950–1967), the television special Julie and Carol at Carnegie Hall (1962), the CBS variety-sketch series The Carol Burnett Show (1967–1987) and the NBC sitcom Mad About You. She was also Emmy-nominated for her roles in The Larry Sanders Show, Law & Order: SVU, and Palm Royale. She has also received 18 Golden Globe Award nominations, winning seven of them, for her work on The Carol Burnett Show. She was nominated for a Critics' Choice Television Award for her dramatic role on Better Call Saul (2022).

For her film roles she has been nominated for four Golden Globe Awards for her performances in the drama Pete 'n' Tillie (1972), the satirical comedy A Wedding (1978), the romantic comedy The Four Seasons (1981), and the musical comedy Annie (1982). On stage, she was nominated for two Tony Awards, her first for Best Actress in a Musical for her role in Once Upon a Mattress (1960), and her second for Best Actress in a Play for Moon Over Buffalo (1996). She won the Special Tony Award in 1969. She has also been thrice for the Grammy Award for Best Audio Book, Narration & Storytelling Recording winning for the narration of her memoir In Such Good Company (2017).

Burnett has also received various honors including two Peabody Awards, a Screen Actors Guild Life Achievement Award, and a Star on the Hollywood Walk of Fame. In 2003, she was honored with the Kennedy Center Honor. In 2005, she received the Presidential Medal of Freedom awarded to her by President George W. Bush. In 2013 she received the Mark Twain Prize for American Humor.

== Major awards ==
=== Critics' Choice Awards ===
Year	Category	Nominated work	Result	Ref.
2022	Best Supporting Actress in a Drama Series	Better Call Saul	Nominated	

=== Emmy Awards ===
Year	Category	Nominated work	Result	Ref.
Primetime Emmy Awards
1962	Outstanding Performance in a Variety or Music Program	The Garry Moore Show	Won	
1963	Outstanding Performance in a Variety or Music Program	Julie and Carol at Carnegie Hall / An Evening with Carol	Won	
1969	Outstanding Performance in a Variety or Music Program	Carol Burnett Show	Nominated	
1970	Outstanding Performance in a Variety or Music Program	Carol Burnett Show	Nominated	
1971	Outstanding Performance in a Variety or Music Program	Carol Burnett Show	Nominated	
1972	Outstanding Variety Series – Musical	Carol Burnett Show	Won	
1972	Outstanding Single Program – Variety or Musical	Julie and Carol at Lincoln Center	Nominated	
1973	Outstanding Variety Musical Series	The Carol Burnett Show	Nominated	
1974	Outstanding Music-Variety Series	The Carol Burnett Show	Won	
1974	Best Lead Actress in a Drama	6 Rms Riv Vu	Nominated	
1975	Outstanding Comedy-Variety or Music Series	The Carol Burnett Show	Won	
1976	Outstanding Comedy-Variety or Music Series	The Carol Burnett Show	Nominated	
1976	Outstanding Special - Comedy-Variety or Music	Sills and Burnett at the Met	Nominated	
1978	Outstanding Comedy-Variety or Music Series	The Carol Burnett Show	Nominated	
1979	Outstanding Lead Actress in a Limited Series or a Special	Friendly Fire	Nominated	
1993	Outstanding Guest Actress in a Comedy Series	The Larry Sanders Show (episode: "The Spider Episode")	Nominated	
1995	Achievement or Performance Music Dance Cultural	Men, Movies & Carol	Nominated	
1997	Outstanding Guest Actress in a Comedy Series	Mad About You (season six)	Won	
1998	Outstanding Guest Actress in a Comedy Series	Mad About You (season seven)	Nominated	
2002	Outstanding Variety, Music or Comedy Special	The Carol Burnett Show: Show Stoppers	Nominated	
2009	Outstanding Guest Actress in a Drama Series	Law & Order: Special Victims Unit (episode: "Ballerina)	Nominated	
2023	Outstanding Variety Special (Pre-Recorded)	Carol Burnett: 90 Years of Laughter + Love	Won	
2024	Outstanding Supporting Actress in a Comedy Series	Palm Royale	Nominated	

=== Golden Globe Awards ===
Year	Category	Nominated work	Result	Ref.
1967	Best TV Star – Female	The Carol Burnett Show	Won	
1969	Best TV Actress – Musical or Comedy	The Carol Burnett Show	Won	
1971	Best TV Actress – Musical or Comedy	The Carol Burnett Show	Won	
1972	Best TV Actress – Musical or Comedy	The Carol Burnett Show	Nominated	
1972	Best Motion Picture Actress – Musical or Comedy	Pete 'n' Tillie	Nominated	
1973	Best TV Actress – Musical or Comedy	The Carol Burnett Show	Nominated	
1974	Best TV Actress – Musical or Comedy	The Carol Burnett Show	Nominated	
1975	Best TV Actress – Musical or Comedy	The Carol Burnett Show	Nominated	
1976	Best TV Actress – Musical or Comedy	The Carol Burnett Show	Won	
1977	Best TV Actress – Musical or Comedy	The Carol Burnett Show	Won	
1978	Best TV Actress – Musical or Comedy	The Carol Burnett Show	Nominated	
1978	Best Motion Picture Actress in a Supporting Role	A Wedding	Nominated	
1981	Best Motion Picture Actress – Comedy or Musical	The Four Seasons	Nominated	
1982	Best Actress in a Motion Picture – Comedy or Musical	Annie	Nominated	
1982	Best Actress in a Miniseries or TV Movie	Life of the Party: The Story of Beatrice	Nominated	
1990	Best Actress in a TV Series – Comedy or Musical	Carol & Company	Nominated	
2018	Carol Burnett Award	—N/a	Honored	

=== Grammy Awards ===
Year	Category	Nominated work	Result	Ref.
2011	Best Spoken Word Album	This Time Together: Laughter and Reflection	Nominated	
2014	Best Spoken Word Album	Carrie and Me	Nominated	
2017	Best Spoken Word Album	In Such Good Company	Won	

=== Tony Awards ===
Year	Category	Nominated work	Result	Ref.
1960	Best Actress in a Musical	Once Upon a Mattress	Nominated	
1969	Special Tony Award	—N/a	Honored	
1996	Best Actress in a Play	Moon Over Buffalo	Nominated	

== Honorary accolades ==
Organizations	Year	Award	Result	Ref.
Peabody Awards	1962	Personal Award	Honored	
Hollywood Walk of Fame	1975	Achievement in the entertainment industry	Honored	
Women in Film Honors	1980	Crystal Award	Honored	
Television Hall of Fame	1985	Inductee	Honored	
Women in Film Honors	1997	Crystal Award	Honored	
Rose Parade	1998	Grand Marshal of the 109th and the 84th Rose Bowl Game	Honored	
Kennedy Center Honors	2003	Medal and Honoree	Honored	
Presidential Medal of Freedom	2005	Civil awards and decorations of the United States	Honored	
California Hall of Fame	2009	Inducted at The California Museum for History, Women and the Arts	Honored	
Mark Twain Prize for American Humor	2013	Mark Twain Prize	Honored	
American Academy of Achievement	2014	Recipient of the Golden Plate Award presented by Julie Andrews	Honored	
The Jimmy Stewart Museum	2014	Harvey Award recipient	Honored	
Screen Actors Guild Award	2015	Lifetime Achievement Award	Honored	
Peabody Award	2018	Career Achievement Award	Honored	
Hollywood Foreign Press Association	2019	First recipient of the Carol Burnett Award	Honored	
Dorian Awards	2024	GALECA Timeless Star Award	Honored	
