= Big D (song) =

1956 song by Frank Loesser

"Big D" is a song about Dallas, Texas, written by Frank Loesser in 1956 for the musical The Most Happy Fella. It was introduced by Susan Johnson as "Cleo" and Shorty Long – the country and not the soul singer as "Herman". The song's refrain spells out "Dallas": "Big D, little A, double L, A, S."

Bing Crosby recorded the song in 1956 with his son Lindsay Crosby for use on Bing's radio show, and it was subsequently issued on the CD New Tricks – 60th Anniversary Deluxe Edition (2017).

Jo Stafford also recorded the song in 1956. It was featured on a various artists EP of Columbia artists, Hits from 'The Most Happy Fella'.

Edmund Hockridge recorded the song for his EP The Most Happy Fella (1960).

Carol Burnett and Julie Andrews performed "Big D" in 1961, while Burnett was a regular and Andrews a guest star on The Garry Moore Show. The success of this appearance led to the development of a 1962 CBS television special, Julie and Carol at Carnegie Hall, in which the pair reprised their duet.
