= Carol + 2 =

- Genre: Variety
- Written by: Nat Hiken
- Directed by: Marc Breaux
- Starring: Carol Burnett; Lucille Ball; Zero Mostel
- Country of origin: United States

Production
- Executive producer: Bob Banner
- Producer: Nat Hiken
- Running time: 60 minutes
- Production company: Bob Banner Associates

Original release
- Network: CBS
- Release: March 22, 1966

Carol + 2 is the second of a multi-year series of variety television specials starring Carol Burnett, aired on CBS network in the United States between 1962 and 1989. The first special, Julie and Carol at Carnegie Hall, was aired in 1962. It featured Burnett and Julie Andrews. On March 22, 1966, Carol + 2 aired, in which Carol was joined by actor Zero Mostel and comedien Lucille Ball.^{[1]}

== Cast ==
- Carol Burnett as Herself / Various Characters
- Lucille Ball as Herself / Various Characters
- Zero Mostel as Himself / Various Characters

== Production ==
The variety / sketch comedy was directed by Marc Breaux. The inclusion of Ball was partly because CBS insisted on Burnett having an established co-star for the special, and also because Ball already had a contract with CBS for up to three specials (in addition to her regular sitcom The Lucy Show) for the 1966–67 season, of which she would only produce one (Lucy in London).

== Release ==
On March 22, 1966, Carol + 2 aired on CBS. The variety / sketch comedy was such a critical and ratings success that CBS rebroadcast it on January 15, 1967. Carol + 2 was released on DVD on May 17. 2016. In April 2016, MeTV broadcast the special for the first time in 50 years.
