= In Such Good Company =

2016 memoir by Carol Burnett

In Such Good Company: Eleven Years of Laughter, Mayhem, and Fun in the Sandbox
- Author: Carol Burnett
- Audio read by: Carol Burnett
- Subject: Memoir
- Publisher: Crown Archetype, Random House Audio
- Publication date: 2016
- Media type: Print / Audio
- Pages: 301
- Awards: Grammy Award for Best Spoken Word Album
- ISBN: 978-1-101-90465-7
- Dewey Decimal: 791.4572
- LC Class: PN1992.77.C3255

In Such Good Company: Eleven Years of Laughter, Mayhem, and Fun in the Sandbox is a 2016 memoir by Carol Burnett, which, in its audio form, earned Burnett a Grammy Award for Best Spoken Word Album. The memoir tells the behind-the-scenes story of The Carol Burnett Show.

Burnett rewatched all 276 episodes of the show (although admitting she fast-forwarded through much of it) and screen-grabbed her favorite video stills from the archives while writing the book to discuss the interactions of the cast members and guests to explain what she felt made the show so successful. Topics range from bringing on cast members Harvey Korman, Vicki Lawrence, Lyle Waggoner, and Tim Conway, to sharing anecdotes about guest stars and close friends, including Lucille Ball, Roddy McDowall, Jim Nabors and more. She talks about designer Bob Mackie and his contributions, creating 60 to 70 costumes a week for the show, including the iconic Went with the Wind! curtain dress. Burnett also mentions her favorite sketches and improvised moments.
