= Jeff Margolis =

American television director and producer (1946–2025)

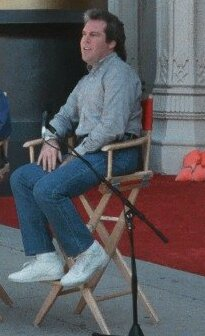
- Margolis on rehearsal day for the 61st Academy Awards
- Born: Jeffrey Mark Margolis; October 14, 1946; Los Angeles, California, U.S.
- Died: May 23, 2025 (aged 78); Nashville, Tennessee, U.S.
- Occupations: Television director; television producer
- Relatives: Monty Hall (uncle)

Jeffrey Mark Margolis (October 14, 1946 – May 23, 2025) was an American television director and producer. He directed The Beatrice Arthur Special (1980), Julie & Carol: Together Again (1989), and multiple Academy Awards ceremonies. He also directed the film Richard Pryor: Live in Concert (1979) and the educational video Be Somebody... or Be Somebody's Fool! (1984), featuring Mr. T.

In addition to his directing work, he won two Primetime Emmy Awards and was nominated for five more in the categories Outstanding Directing for a Variety Series and Outstanding Variety Special. He also won two Directors Guild of America Awards in the category Outstanding Directing for Musical Variety.

He was director of the telecasts of the 61st Academy Awards, 62nd Academy Awards, 63rd Academy Awards, 64th Academy Awards, 65th Academy Awards, 66th Academy Awards, 67th Academy Awards and 68th Academy Awards (1989–1996).

Margolis was born in Los Angeles, California. He began his career in television, serving as a cue card holder for his uncle Monty Hall on the television game show Let's Make a Deal. His memoir, We're Live in 5: My Extraordinary Life in Television, was published in 2020.

Margolis died at his home in Nashville, Tennessee, on May 23, 2025, at the age of 78.
