= Paul Miller (TV director) =

American director

Paul D. Miller is an American director whose credits include directing Saturday Night Live in the 1980s. He has also directed for MADtv and ALF, as well as In Living Color.

He received an undergraduate degree from Ohio University in 1971, and is the son of director Walter C. Miller.

== Awards ==
- Emmy, Best Director for a Variety/Music Program, for 1998 Tony Awards
- In 2024 he won the Directors Guild of America Award for Outstanding Directorial Achievement in Variety/Talk/News/Sports – Specials for Carol Burnett: 90 Years of Laughter + Love

== Career ==
He has worked as a director in the following:

- Country Music Awards
- Saturday Night Live
- The Pest
