= Julie and Carol at Lincoln Center =

1971 film directed by Dave Powers

- Written by: Bob Ellison; Marty Farrell; Mitzie Welch
- Directed by: Dave Powers
- Starring: Julie Andrews; Carol Burnett
- Music by: Peter Matz
- Country of origin: United States
- Original language: English

Production
- Producer: Joe Hamilton
- Running time: 60 minutes

Original release
- Network: CBS
- Release: December 7, 1971

Related
- Julie & Carol: Together Again

Julie and Carol at Lincoln Center is a 1971 American television special featuring Julie Andrews and Carol Burnett, their second out of three specials after Julie and Carol at Carnegie Hall (1962) and before Julie & Carol: Together Again (1989). Held at the Philharmonic Hall at Lincoln Center in New York City, it was produced by Joe Hamilton, and written by Bob Ellison, Marty Farrell and Mitzi Welch, who reused the template from the first show.

== Setlist ==
1	Our Classy Classical Show
2	Girls In The Band
3	Madame Abernall's (I Could Have Danced All Night)
4	He's Gone Away
5	Medley Of The 60's
6	Wait Till The Sun Shines Nellie
7	Finale

As with the previous concert, the two comedian singers performed a medley; this one 14 minutes long and celebrating music of the 60's.

== Critical reception and analysis ==
The audience was not watching two supertalented singing actresses cutting up and making fun at the country's premier temple of culture; they were watching two beloved icons trying — or perhaps pretending to try — to cut up.

— Playbill,

The official website of Carnegie Hall asserted that this reprise of the Carnegie Hall concert confirmed that Julie and Carol had achieved a level of fame, success, and double-act after their 1962 show. Playbill lamented that this show tried to mimic its predecessor. Denton Record-Chronicle deemed the special "renowned".

The show was nominated for the 1972 Emmy for Outstanding Single Program – Variety or Musical – Variety and Popular Music.
