= Carol Burnett =

American comedian and actress (born 1933)

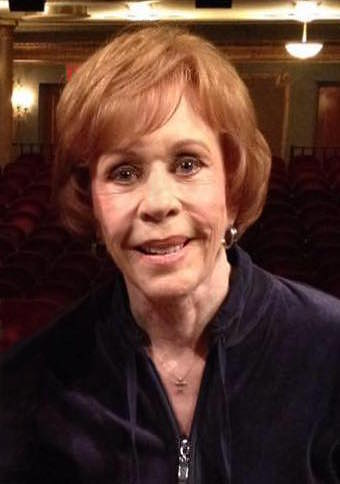
- Burnett in 2014
- Born: Carol Creighton Burnett; April 26, 1933 (age 93); San Antonio, Texas, U.S.
- Occupations: Comedian; actress; singer; writer
- Years active: 1955–present
- Spouses: Don Saroyan (m. 1955; div. 1962) Joe Hamilton (m. 1963; div. 1984) Brian Miller (m. 2001)
- Children: 3, including Carrie and Erin
- Notable work: The Carol Burnett Show; Miss Agatha Hannigan in Annie; Eunice Harper Higgins on Mama's Family; See also full list

Comedy career
- Medium: Film; television; theater; writing
- Genres: Parody; satire; slapstick

Carol Creighton Burnett (born April 26, 1933) is an American comedian, actress, singer and writer. Burnett has played dramatic and comedic roles on stage and screen. She has received numerous awards and accolades, including five Golden Globe Awards, a Grammy Award, seven Primetime Emmy Awards, twelve People's Choice Awards, two Peabody Awards. Burnett was honored with a Special Tony Award in 1969, Star on the Hollywood Walk of Fame in 1975, the Presidential Medal of Freedom in 2005, the Mark Twain Prize for American Humor in 2013, the Screen Actors Guild Life Achievement Award in 2015, and the inaugural Golden Globe Carol Burnett Award in 2019.

Burnett was born and raised in San Antonio, Texas, until her family moved to Hollywood, living a block away from Hollywood Boulevard. She attended Hollywood High School and eventually studied theater and musical comedy at UCLA. Later, she moved to New York City, performed in nightclubs there, and had a breakout success on Broadway in 1959 in Once Upon a Mattress, for which she received a Tony Award nomination. She soon made her television debut, regularly appearing on The Garry Moore Show for the next three years, and won her first Emmy Award in 1962.

Eventually, Burnett moved back to Los Angeles and began an 11-year run as star of the CBS variety-sketch comedy series The Carol Burnett Show from 1967 to 1978. She is the first woman to host a comedy-variety series. With its vaudeville roots, The Carol Burnett Show was a variety show that combined comedy sketches with song and dance. The comedy sketches included film parodies and character pieces. Burnett created many memorable characters during the show's run, and both she and the show won numerous Emmy and Golden Globe Awards.

Burnett's film roles include Pete 'n' Tillie (1972), The Front Page (1974), A Wedding (1978), The Four Seasons (1981), Annie (1982), Noises Off (1992), and Horton Hears a Who! (2008). On television, she won an Emmy Award for her guest role in Mad About You. She appeared in multiple specials with Julie Andrews. She was nominated for a Tony for her role in Moon Over Buffalo (1995). Recently she has acted in Better Call Saul (2022), Palm Royale (2024), and Hacks (2025). She recorded her memoir In Such Good Company (2016), for which she won a Grammy Award.

In 2019, the Golden Globes created the Carol Burnett Award for career achievement in television, giving Burnett the first award. She was honored with an NBC special Carol Burnett: 90 Years of Laughter + Love celebrating her 90th birthday.

== Early life and education ==
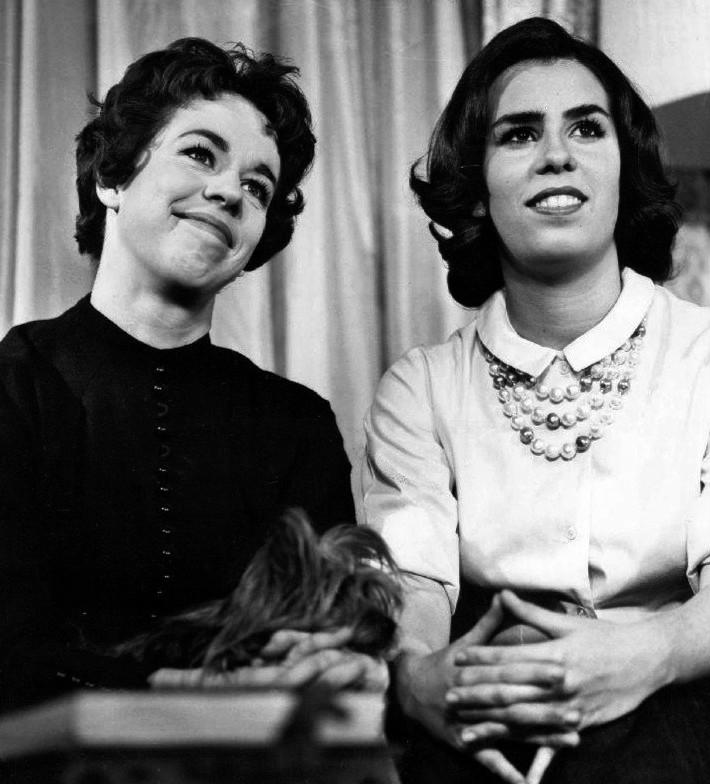
Burnett (left) and her sister Chrissie on Person to Person, 1961

Carol Creighton Burnett was born on April 26, 1933, at Nix Hospital in San Antonio, Texas, the daughter of Ina Louise (née Creighton), a publicity writer for movie studios, and Joseph Thomas Burnett, a movie theater manager. She was named after Carole Lombard. Her maternal grandparents were William Henry Creighton (1873–1918) and Mabel Eudora "Mae" Jones (1885–1967). Her parents divorced in the late 1930s. Subsequently, both parents independently moved to Hollywood and Burnett moved with her grandmother to a one-room apartment near her mother. They lived in an impoverished area of Hollywood, California, in a boarding house with Burnett's younger half-sister Chrissie.

When Burnett was in second grade, she briefly invented an imaginary twin sister named Karen, with Shirley Temple-like dimples. She later recalled that, motivated to further the pretense, she "fooled the other boarders in the rooming house where we lived by frantically switching clothes and dashing in and out of the house by the fire escape and the front door. Then I became exhausted and Karen mysteriously vanished." When Burnett was nine, she taught herself how to do the "Tarzan yell", which she realized years later was a good vocal exercise for volume, and it became a fan favorite. Burnett's first experiences with singing were with her family. Her grandmother was a trained musician who could play the piano (although they did not have one at the time), and her mother played the ukulele, so they sometimes sang popular songs in harmony together around the kitchen table. Her grandmother frequently took Burnett and her sister to the movies. They would take a few rolls of toilet paper home from the theater. The movies she saw in her youth influenced the sketch content in The Carol Burnett Show.

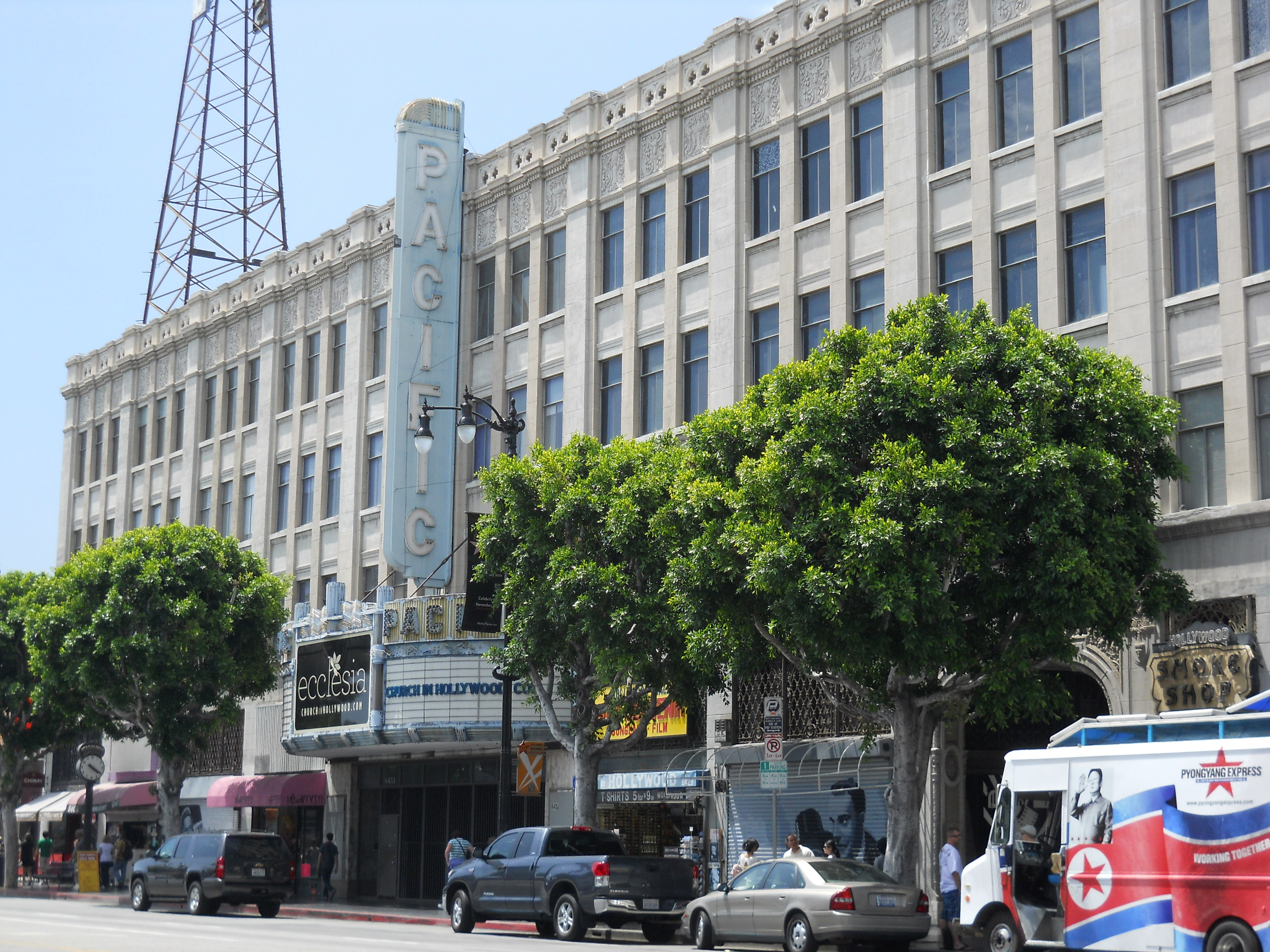
Hollywood Pacific Theatre in 2010, site of Burnett's star

Burnett worked as an usherette at the Warner Brothers Theater (now the Hollywood Pacific Theatre). When the cinema screened Alfred Hitchcock's Strangers on a Train (1951), having already seen and enjoyed the film, she advised two patrons arriving during the last five minutes of a showing to wait until the beginning of the next showing to avoid spoiling the ending for them, but the couple insisted on being seated. The manager observed Burnett not letting the couple in and fired her, stripping the epaulettes from her uniform on the spot. Years later in the 1970s after achieving TV stardom, when the Hollywood Chamber of Commerce offered her a star on the Hollywood Walk of Fame, they asked her where she wanted it. She replied "Right in front of where the old Warner Brothers Theater was, at Hollywood and Wilcox", which is where it was placed, at 6439 Hollywood Blvd.

After graduating from Hollywood High School in 1951, Burnett received an anonymous envelope containing $50 for one year's tuition at UCLA, where she initially planned on studying journalism. During her first year of college, she switched her focus to theater arts and English, with the goal of becoming a playwright. She found she had to take an acting course to enter the playwright program. On the subject, she later reflected: "I wasn't really ready to do the acting thing, but I had no choice." During her first performance, she got a sudden impulse to speak her lines in a new way. "Don't ask me why, but when we were in front of the audience, I suddenly decided I was going to stretch out all my words and my first line came out 'I'm baaaaaaaack!'" The audience response moved her deeply:

They laughed and it felt great. All of a sudden, after so much coldness and emptiness in my life, I knew the sensation of all that warmth wrapping around me. I had always been a quiet, shy, sad sort of girl and then everything changed for me. You spend the rest of your life hoping you'll hear a laugh that great again.

During this time, she performed in several university productions, garnering recognition for her comedic and musical abilities. Her mother disapproved of her acting ambitions:

She wanted me to be a writer. She said you can always write, no matter what you look like. When I was growing up she told me to be a little lady, and a couple of times I got a whack for crossing my eyes or making funny faces. Of course, she never, I never, dreamed I would ever perform.

The young Burnett, always insecure about her looks, responded many years later to her mother's advice of "You can always write, no matter what you look like" by noting "God, that hurt!" in her memoir One More Time (1986).

During her junior year at UCLA in 1954, a professor invited Burnett and some other students to perform at a party in place of their class final that had been canceled (which required a performance in front of an audience). Afterwards, a man and his wife approached her while Burnett was stuffing cookies in her purse to take home to her grandmother. Instead of reprimanding her, the man complimented her performance and asked about her future plans. When he learned that she wanted to travel to New York in order to try her luck in musical comedy but could not afford the trip, he offered her and her boyfriend (Don Saroyan) each, on the spot, a $1,000 (equivalent to $11,989 in 2025) interest-free loan; the man, who was a millionaire from La Jolla, California, wasn't affiliated with show business and had earned his wealth from the shipbuilding industry. His conditions were simply that the loans were to be repaid within five years, his name was never to be revealed, and if she achieved success, she would help other aspiring talents to pursue their artistic dreams. Burnett took him up on his offer, and she and Saroyan left college and moved to New York to pursue acting careers. That same year, her father died of causes related to his alcoholism.

== Career ==
=== 1955–1966: Rise to prominence ===
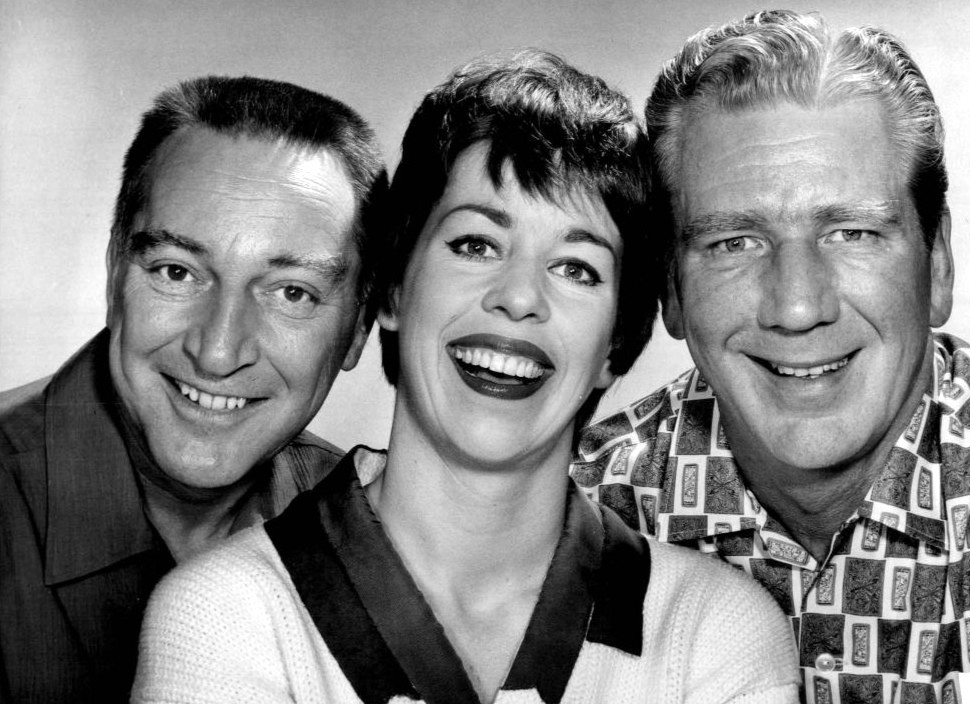
1961 cast photo from The Garry Moore Show. From left to right: Garry Moore, Burnett, and Durward Kirby.

Burnett spent her first year in New York working as a hat-check girl and trying to land acting jobs. She and other girls living at the Rehearsal Club (a boarding house for women seriously pursuing acting careers) put on The Rehearsal Club Revue on March 3, 1955. They mailed invitations to agents, who showed up along with stars like Celeste Holm and Marlene Dietrich. Such attendance opened doors for several of the girls.

Burnett was cast in a minor role on The Paul Winchell and Jerry Mahoney Show in 1955. She played the girlfriend of a ventriloquist's dummy on the popular children's program. This role led to her starring role opposite Buddy Hackett in the short-lived sitcom Stanley from 1956 to 1957.

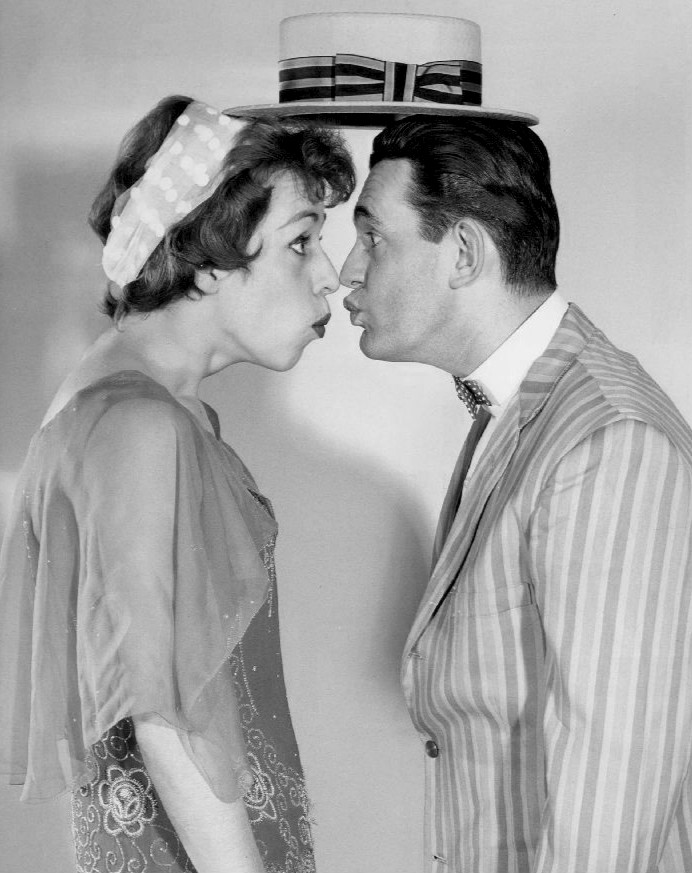
Burnett and Larry Blyden from The Garry Moore Show, 1960

After Stanley, Burnett found herself unemployed for a short time. A few months later she bounced back, becoming highly popular as a performer on the New York circuit of cabarets and night clubs, most notably for a hit parody number called "I Made a Fool of Myself Over John Foster Dulles" (Dulles was Secretary of State at the time). In 1957, she performed this number on both The Tonight Show and The Ed Sullivan Show. Dulles was asked about her on Meet the Press and joked, "I never discuss matters of the heart in public." Around this time she also worked as a regular on one of television's earliest game shows, Pantomime Quiz. On January 10, 1958, just as she was achieving her first small successes, her mother died. In October 1960, Burnett debuted at New York City's Blue Angel Supper Club, where she was discovered by scouts for The Jack Paar Show and The Ed Sullivan Show.

Burnett's first true taste of success came with her appearance on Broadway in the 1959 musical Once Upon a Mattress, for which she was nominated for a Tony Award; in the same year, she paid back her mysterious benefactor "to the day" after agreeing to her non-obligatory unsecured loan of $1,000. The same year, she became a regular player on The Garry Moore Show, a job that lasted until 1962. She won an Emmy Award that year for her "Outstanding Performance in a Variety or Musical Program or Series" on the show. She portrayed a number of characters, most memorably the put-upon cleaning woman. The character later became her signature alter-ego. With her success on the Moore Show, Burnett finally rose to headliner status and appeared in the special Julie and Carol at Carnegie Hall (1962), co-starring with her friend Julie Andrews. The show was produced by Bob Banner, directed by Joe Hamilton and written by Mike Nichols and Ken Welch. Julie and Carol at Carnegie Hall won an Emmy Award for Outstanding Program Achievement in the Field of Music, and Burnett won an Emmy for her performance. She also guest-starred on a number of shows during this time, including The Twilight Zone episode "Cavender Is Coming". In July 1963 Burnett starred as Calamity Jane in the Dallas State Fair Musicals production of Calamity Jane and had her television special debut in 1963 when CBS aired that production on November 12, 1963.

In 1964, Burnett starred in the Broadway musical Fade Out – Fade In but was forced to withdraw after sustaining a neck injury in a taxi accident. She returned to the show later but withdrew again to participate in a variety show, The Entertainers, opposite Caterina Valente and Bob Newhart. The producers of Fade Out – Fade In sued the actress for breach of contract after her absences from the popular show caused its failure, but the suit was later dropped. The Entertainers ran for only one season. Around the same time, Burnett became good friends with Jim Nabors, who was enjoying great success with his series Gomer Pyle – USMC As a result of their close friendship, she played a recurring role on Nabors' show as a tough corporal and later as a gunnery sergeant (starting with the episode "Corporal Carol"). Later, Nabors would be the first guest on her variety show each season. She considered him to be her good-luck charm.

In 1959, Lucille Ball became a friend and mentor to Burnett. After having guested on Burnett's highly successful CBS-TV special Carol + 2 (1966) and having the younger performer reciprocate by appearing on The Lucy Show (1966–1967), it was rumored that Ball offered Burnett a chance to star on her own sitcom. In truth, Burnett was offered (but declined) Here's Agnes by CBS executives. The two women remained close friends until Ball's death in 1989. Ball sent flowers every year on Burnett's birthday. When Burnett awoke on the day of her 56th birthday in 1989, she discovered via the morning news that Ball had died. Later that afternoon, flowers arrived at Burnett's house with a note reading, "Happy Birthday, Kid. Love, Lucy."

In 1963 she made her feature film debut in the comedy Who's Been Sleeping in My Bed? starring opposite Dean Martin and Elizabeth Montgomery. Burnett said of her role in the film, "I should have been given the award for 'Worst Performance Ever Given in Movies by an Actress.' I was confused, bored and I missed the [live] audience. Nothing was spontaneous." During this time she acted in the CBS variety show The Entertainers alongside Bob Newhart and in an episode of the Mel Brooks and Buck Henry created spy comedy series Get Smart in 1966.

=== 1967–1978: The Carol Burnett Show ===
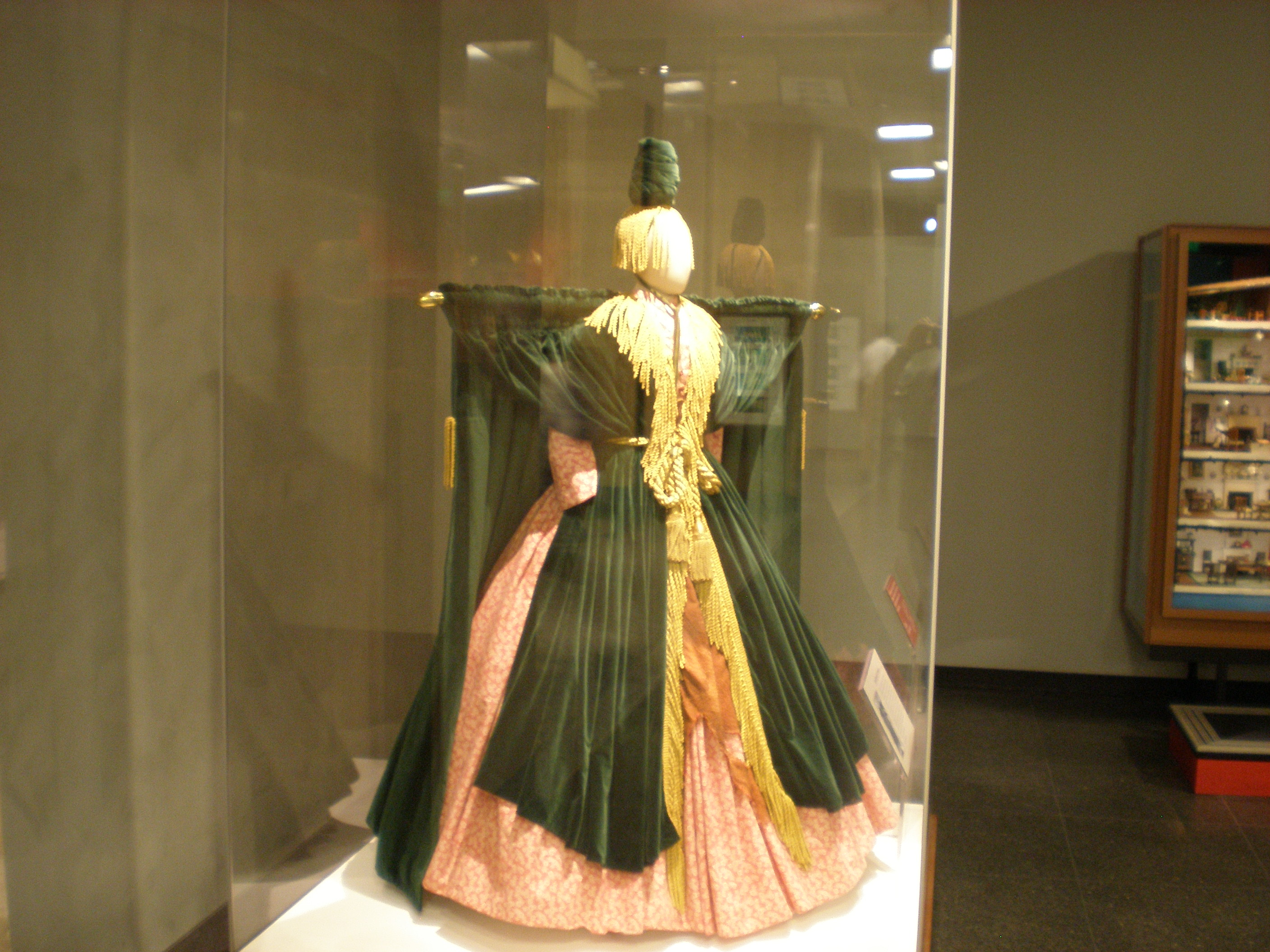
The Bob Mackie–designed curtain dress worn by Burnett in the Went with the Wind! sketch, housed at the Smithsonian Institution

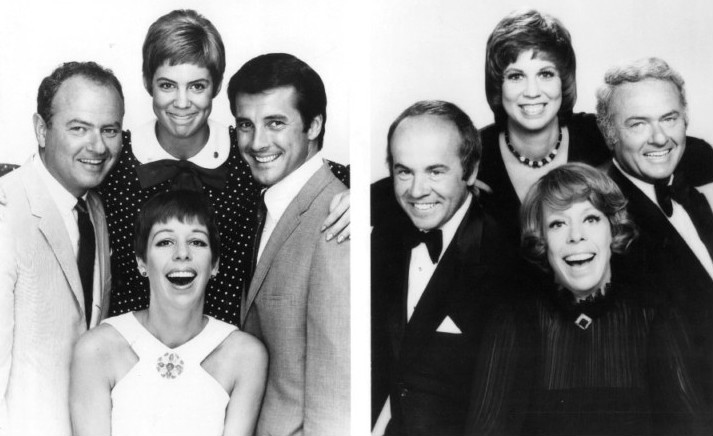
On the left, cast members in 1967 (clockwise from the bottom): Burnett, Harvey Korman, Vicki Lawrence and Lyle Waggoner. On the right, the 1977 cast: Burnett, Tim Conway, Lawrence and Korman.

In 1967, after CBS offered Burnett Here's Agnes, she exercised a stipulation in her ten-year contract with CBS that said she had five years from the date The Garry Moore Show ended to "push the button" on hosting thirty one-hour episodes of a music/comedy variety show. As a result, the hour-long Carol Burnett Show was born and debuted in September 1967, eventually garnering 23 Emmy Awards and winning or being nominated for multiple Emmy and Golden Globe Awards every season it was on the air. Its ensemble cast included Tim Conway (who was a guest player until the ninth season), Harvey Korman, Lyle Waggoner and the teenaged Vicki Lawrence, whom Burnett discovered and mentored. The network initially did not want her to do a variety show because it believed only men could be successful at variety, but her contract required that it give her one season of whatever kind of show she wanted to make. She chose to carry on the tradition of past variety show successes. During this time Burnett was the first celebrity to appear on the children's series Sesame Street, appearing on that series' first episode on November 10, 1969. She also made occasional returns to the stage in the 1970s and 1980s. In 1974, she appeared at the Muny Theatre in St. Louis, Missouri, in I Do! I Do! with Rock Hudson.

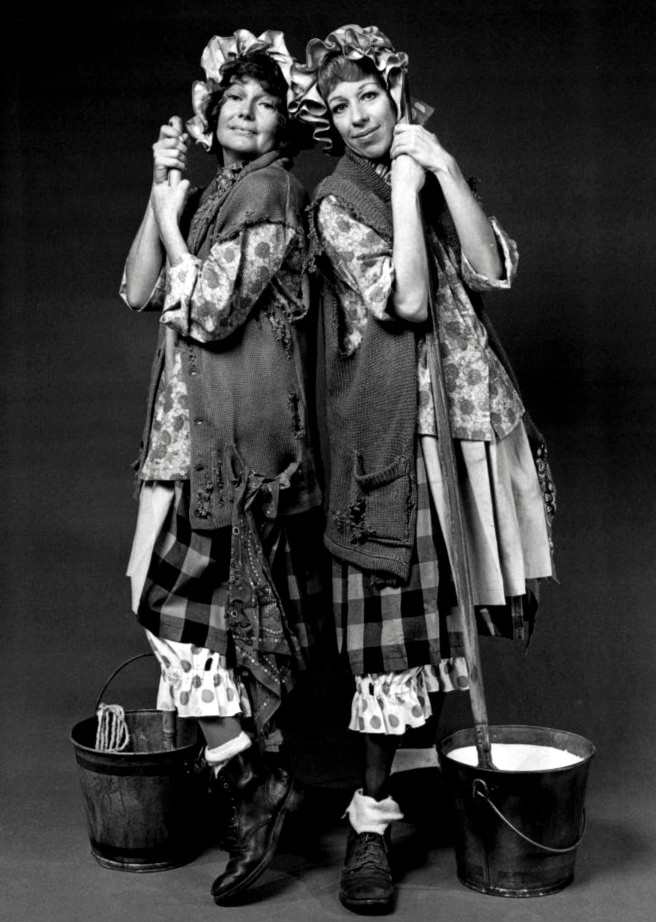
Burnett, as her well-known charwoman character, gets a hand from guest star Rita Hayworth in 1971.

A true variety show, The Carol Burnett Show struck a chord with viewers. Among other subjects, it parodied films (Went with the Wind! for Gone with the Wind), television (As the Stomach Turns for the soap opera As the World Turns) and commercials. There were also frequent musical numbers. Burnett and her team struck gold with the original sketch "The Family", which eventually was spun off into the television show Mama's Family, starring Vicki Lawrence. She opened most shows with an impromptu question-and-answer session with the audience, lasting a few minutes, during which she often demonstrated her ability to humorously ad lib. On numerous occasions, she obliged when asked to perform her trademark Tarzan yell. She ended each show by tugging on her left ear, which was a message to her grandmother. This was done to let her know that she was doing well and that she loved her. During the show's run, her grandmother died. On an Intimate Portrait episode about Burnett, she tearfully recalled her grandmother's last moments: "She said to my husband Joe from her hospital bed 'Joe, you see that spider up there?' There was no spider, but Joe said he did anyhow. She said 'Every few minutes a big spider jumps on that little spider and they go at it like rabbits!!' And then she died. There's laughter in everything!" Burnett continued the tradition of tugging her ear.

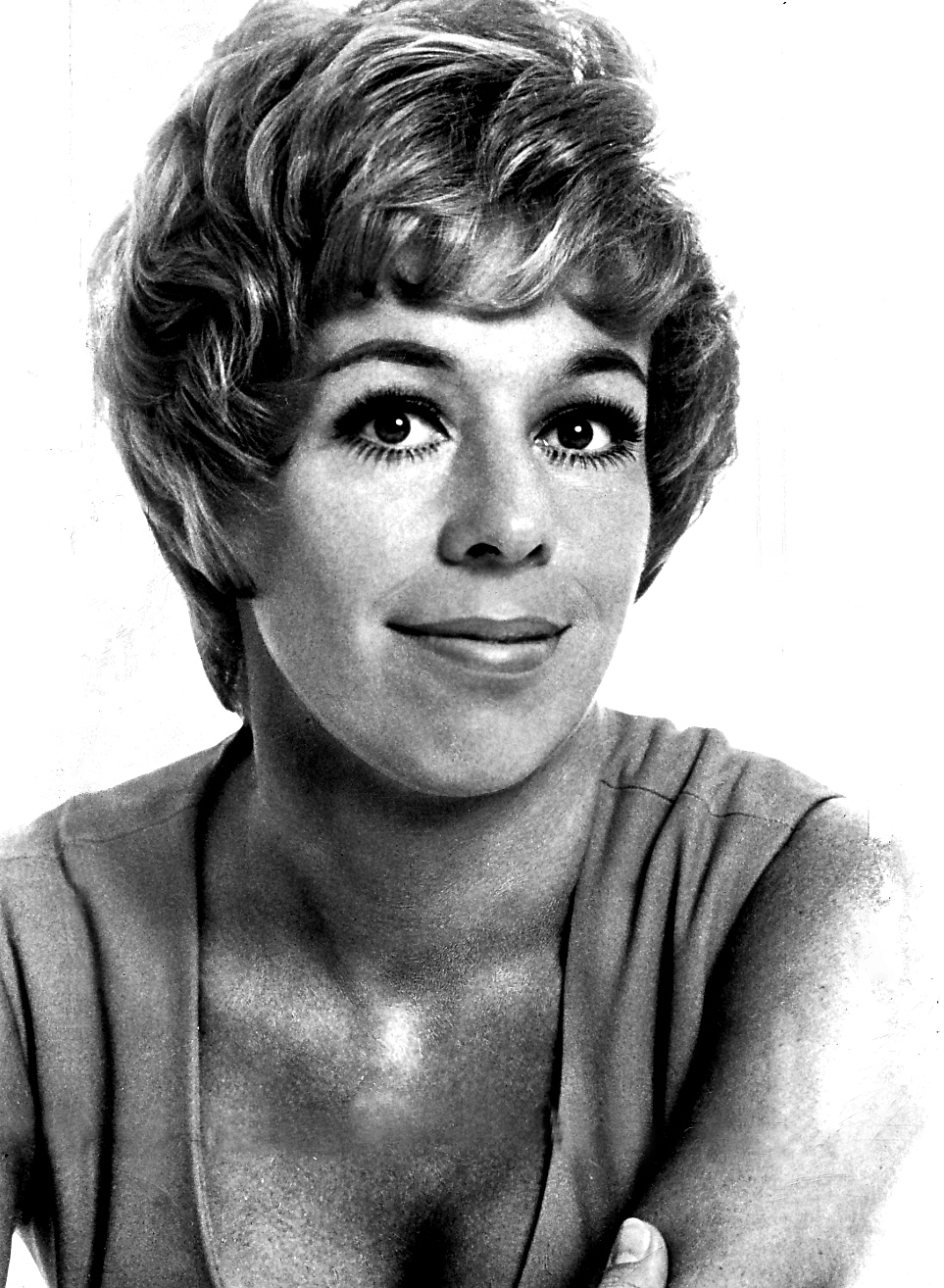
Burnett in 1974

The show ceased production in 1978. Four post-script episodes were produced and aired on ABC during the summer of 1979 under the title Carol Burnett & Company. The productions used essentially the same format and, with the exception of Harvey Korman and Lyle Waggoner, the same supporting cast. Beginning in 1977, the comedy sketches of her series were edited into half-hour episodes for syndication entitled Carol Burnett and Friends, which for many years proved to be extremely popular in syndication. In the digital age, the series began airing on MeTV in January 2015. Burnett starred in a few films while her variety show was running, including Pete 'n' Tillie (1972) and The Front Page (1974). She was nominated for an Emmy in 1974 for her role in the drama 6 Rms Riv Vu. The show's enduring popularity surprised many when a 2001 retrospective containing outtakes and discussions with the cast, and a tribute to Bob Mackie, who designed all of the costumes that appeared on the show and enhanced outfits with comedic touches, drew in 30 million viewers, topping the Emmy Awards as well as all but the final game of that year's World Series. Her Grammy-winning memoir In Such Good Company is about the show, and Burnett tells about how it was developed, with anecdotes about improvisations, the cast, crew, and guests.

=== 1979–1999: Film roles and return to Broadway ===
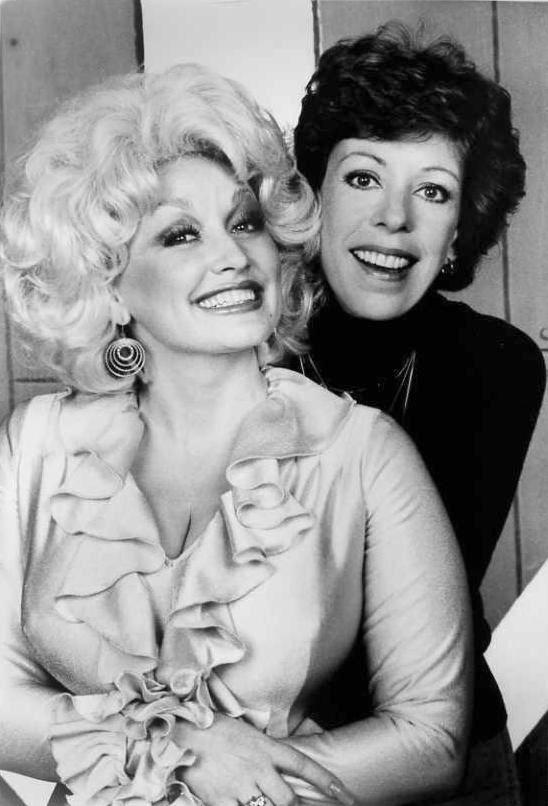
Dolly Parton with Burnett in 1980

After her show ended, she assumed a number of roles that departed from comedy. She appeared in several dramatic roles, most notably in the television movie Friendly Fire. She appeared as Beatrice O'Reilly in the film Life of The Party: The Story of Beatrice, a story about a woman fighting her alcoholism. Her other film work includes Robert Altman's comedy-drama A Wedding (1978), Alan Alda's romantic comedy The Four Seasons (1981), John Huston's musical film Annie (1982), and Peter Bogdanovich's comedy Noises Off (1992). She took the supporting role of Carlotta Campion in the 1985 concert performance of Stephen Sondheim's Follies. In 1995, after an absence of 30 years, she was back on Broadway in Moon Over Buffalo, for which she was nominated for a Tony Award for Best Actress in a Play. Four years later, she appeared in the Broadway revue Putting It Together.

In the 1980s and 1990s, she made several attempts at starting a new variety program. She also appeared briefly on The Carol Burnett Show's "The Family" sketches' spinoff, Mama's Family, as her stormy character, Eunice Higgins. She played the matriarch in the cult comedy miniseries Fresno, which parodied the primetime soap opera Falcon Crest. In 1987 she starred in a variety sketch special, Carol, Carl, Whoopi and Robin alongside Carl Reiner, Whoopi Goldberg, and Robin Williams. That same year she starred in the TV movie Plaza Suite with Dabney Coleman and Hal Holbrook. She reunited with Julie Andrews in the ABC special Julie & Carol: Together Again which they performed at the Pantages Theatre in Hollywood. She returned to television with the comedy series Carol & Company from 1990 to 1991. She guest starred as herself in The Larry Sanders Show in 1992 and in the sitcom Mad About You, playing Theresa Stemple, the mother of main character Jamie Buchman (Helen Hunt), for which she won the Primetime Emmy Award for Outstanding Guest Actress in a Comedy Series.

She made frequent appearances as a panelist on the game show Password, an association she maintained until the early 1980s (Mark Goodson awarded her his Silver Password All-Stars Award for best celebrity player; she is also credited with coming up with the title Password Plus, when it was originally titled Password '79). Burnett had long been a fan of the soap opera All My Children and realized a dream when Agnes Nixon created the role of Verla Grubbs for her in 1983. Burnett played the long-lost daughter of Langley Wallingford (Louis Edmonds), causing trouble for her stepmother Phoebe Tyler-Wallingford (Ruth Warrick). She made occasional appearances on the soap opera in each decade thereafter. She hosted a 25th-anniversary special about the show in 1995 and made a brief cameo appearance as Verla Grubbs on the January 5, 2005, episode which celebrated the show's 35th anniversary. She reprised her role as Grubbs in September 2011 as part of the series' finale. She also starred in television films such as Seasons of the Heart (1994).

=== 2000–present: Pause and return to acting ===
Burnett's first voice role was in The Trumpet of the Swan in 2001. In 2008, she had her second role as an animated character in the film Horton Hears a Who! In 2012, she had another voice role as the character Hara in the US Disney-dubbed version of The Secret World of Arrietty. In 2019, she voiced a talking chair, named Chairol Burnett, in Toy Story 4. Burnett similarly returned to film in 2005 to star in a different role as Queen Aggravain in the movie version of Once Upon a Mattress. She guest-starred in season two episodes of Desperate Housewives as Bree's stepmother, Elanor Mason. In 2009, she made a guest appearance on the Law & Order: Special Victims Unit, for which she was nominated for the Emmy Award for Outstanding Guest Actress in a Drama Series. In November 2010, she guest-starred on an episode of Glee as the mother of cheerleading coach Sue Sylvester. In 2014, Burnett joined two-time Tony Award winner Brian Dennehy on Broadway in A. R. Gurney's Love Letters. She appeared on the reboot of Hawaii Five-0 as Steve McGarrett's Aunt Debbie. Her appearances, traditionally on Thanksgiving-themed episodes, were featured from 2013 until the character died of cancer in the January 15, 2016, episode.

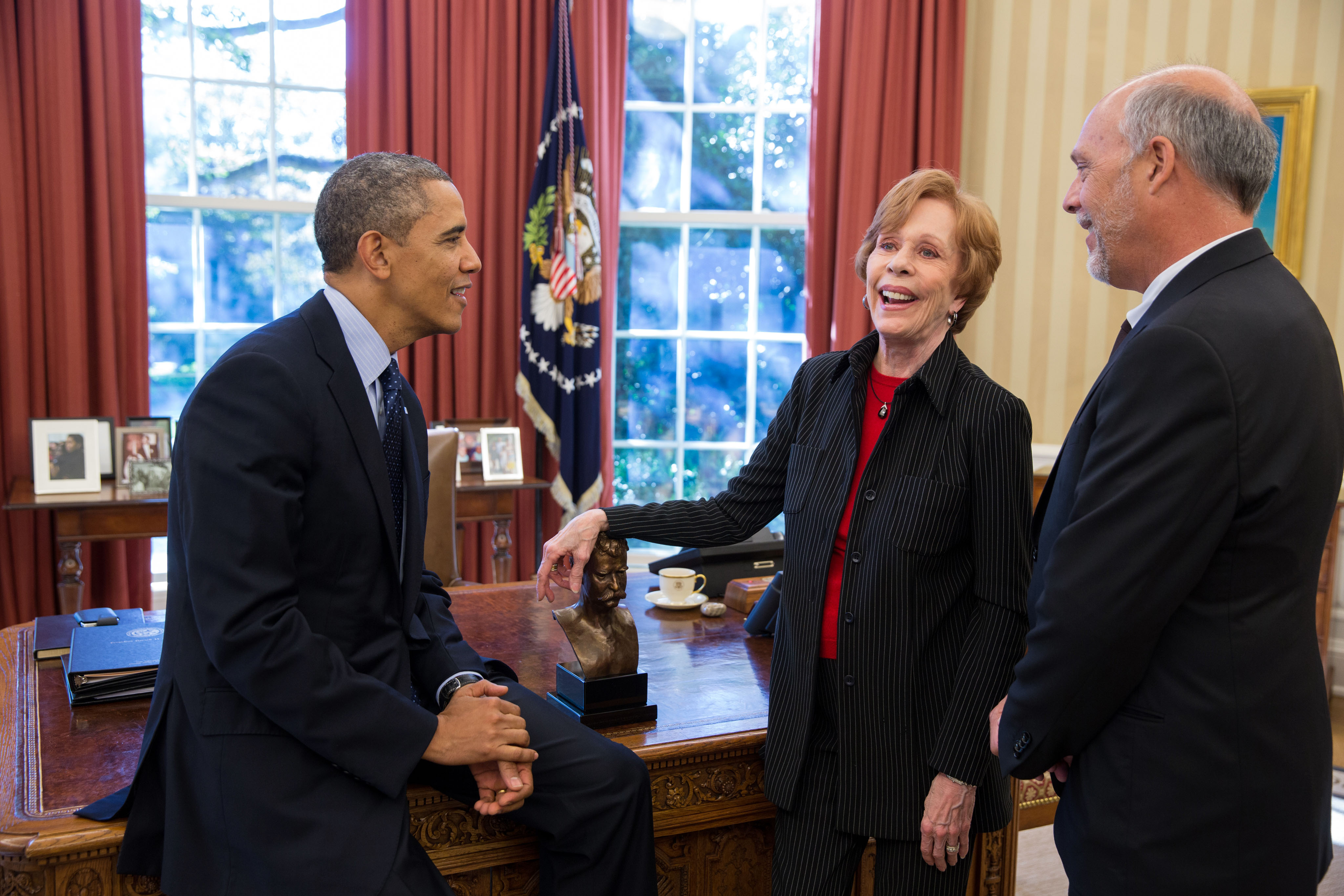
President Barack Obama with Burnett and her husband Brian Miller in the Oval Office in 2013

Burnett has mostly stayed away from the spotlight, yet she still earns honorary awards for her groundbreaking work in comedy. For instance in 2013, she received the Mark Twain Prize for American Humor at the Kennedy Center. Those who were there to honor Burnett included her longtime friends and collaborators Julie Andrews, Vicki Lawrence and Tim Conway, as well as Tina Fey, Amy Poehler, Maya Rudolph, Rashida Jones and Martin Short. In 2017, CBS aired The Carol Burnett Show: 50th Anniversary Special. The event featured Burnett, original cast members Vicki Lawrence and Lyle Waggoner, costume designer Bob Mackie and special guests Jim Carrey, Kristin Chenoweth, Stephen Colbert, Harry Connick Jr., Bill Hader, Jay Leno, Jane Lynch, Bernadette Peters, Maya Rudolph and Martin Short. Burnett spoke about the adversity she endured, saying "They said it was a man's game—Sid Caesar, Dean Martin, Milton Berle—because it hadn't been done. But that doesn't mean it couldn't be done."

In 2019, the Golden Globes created an award in Burnett's name, the Carol Burnett Award, for career achievement in television. Burnett was also announced as the first recipient of the award. The Hollywood Foreign Press said in a statement, "For more than 50 years, comedy trailblazer Carol Burnett has been breaking barriers while making us laugh". Steve Carell presented the award to Burnett.

In June 2022, Burnett guest starred in the second half of the sixth and final season of American drama series Better Call Saul, a spin-off, prequel, and sequel to Breaking Bad. Burnett was announced to be portraying a character named "Marion" on June 27, 2022, by AMC. Of how she got the role Burnett stated, "I was a big fan of Breaking Bad and I knew Vince Gilligan...When they started Better Call Saul, I got hooked on that and he said, 'you know, maybe I'll write something for you for Saul.' I said, I don't care if it's one sentence. I'll be there. Because I just love their writing. I spent two and a half months in New Mexico doing that and it was just a delight." Upon Burnett missing out on an Emmy nomination for her role, Daniel Feinberg of The Hollywood Reporter praised Burnett, lamenting the outcome and describing her performance "as a subtle symphony of world-weary nuance."

On April 26, 2023, Burnett was honored for her music, film, television, and theater roles by her friends and fellow actors and singers on her 90th birthday in the NBC special Carol Burnett: 90 Years of Laughter + Love, which was filmed at the Avalon Hollywood Theatre. Numerous stars came out to pay tribute to Burnett including Julie Andrews, Cher, Ellen DeGeneres, Lily Tomlin, Amy Poehler, and Kristin Wiig. The special won the Emmy for Outstanding Variety Special (pre-recorded) at the 75th Creative Emmy Arts Emmy Awards. As an executive producer of the special, Burnett accepted the Emmy on behalf of the special's team. Burnett also presented the Emmy Award for Outstanding Lead Actress in a Comedy Series to Quinta Brunson for Abbott Elementary at the 75th Primetime Emmy Awards. Upon accepting the Emmy from Burnett, Brunson started to choke up saying, "I don't even know why I'm so emotional. I think, like, the Carol Burnett of it all".

In March 2024, Burnett co-starred alongside Kristen Wiig, Allison Janney, and Laura Dern in the Apple TV+ comedy series Palm Royale. Her performance earned praise from critics, with Tom Gliatto of People highlighting Burnett as the series' "strongest performance", adding: "Burnett plays Norma with an unforgiving toughness — even when she's comatose — and, by some miracle, she projects the slapstick kick of her old CBS comedy show." Judy Berman of Time wrote "the legendary Carol Burnett [plays] the funniest convalescent you'll ever meet." Burnett said that while Palm Royale was "probably" her last acting appearance, she was pursuing other projects as a writer, producer, or presenter.

In 2025, she played herself in the Max comedy series Hacks season four episode entitled, "I Love L.A.". In the episode Burnett offers some critical advice to Deborah (played by Jean Smart) who's overcome by a sudden bout of anxiety. Smart said of Burnett, "It was such a treat to have her. There's nobody like her in terms of comedy and just being an incredibly cool human being.... If I can be like her or Betty White when I'm in my 90s, I'll be a very, very happy lady."

== Acting credits and accolades ==
Burnett has received 23 Primetime Emmy Award nominations with 6 wins for her work in The Garry Moore Show, Julie and Carol at Carnegie Hall, The Carol Burnett Show, Mad About You, and Palm Royale. In 2024 at age 91, she became the oldest nominee for a Primetime Emmy Award for Outstanding Supporting Actress in a Comedy Series, for her work in Palm Royale.

She also received 18 Golden Globe Award nominations, winning 7 Awards, for her work on The Carol Burnett Show. She also received 3 Tony Awards and 3 Grammy Awards nominations, winning one of each.

Burnett also received various honors including 2 Peabody Awards, a Screen Actors Guild Life Achievement Award and a Star on the Hollywood Walk of Fame. In 2003, she was honored with the Kennedy Center Honor. In 2005, she received the Presidential Medal of Freedom, awarded to her by President George W. Bush. In 2013, she received the Mark Twain Prize for American Humor. In 2019 she became the first recipient of the Carol Burnett Lifetime Achievement Award for Television, which was named in her honor.

On her 90th birthday she was honored with an NBC variety special entitled, Carol Burnett: 90 Years of Laughter + Love where various collaborators and performers paid tribute to her. This included Julie Andrews, Vicki Lawrence, Lily Tomlin, Steve Carell, Amy Poehler, Ellen DeGeneres, Bob Odenkirk, and Cher among many others.

== Personal life ==
=== Marriages and family ===
Burnett married her college sweetheart Don Saroyan on December 15, 1955. They divorced in 1962.

On May 4, 1963, Burnett married television producer Joe Hamilton, a divorced father of eight and brother of actress Kipp Hamilton who had produced her 1962 Carnegie Hall concert. He later produced The Carol Burnett Show, among other projects. The couple had three daughters:

- Carrie Hamilton (December 5, 1963 – January 20, 2002), who died at the age of 38 from pneumonia as a complication of lung and brain cancer. She was a writer and an actress.
- Jody Hamilton (born January 18, 1967), a film producer and, as of 2023, the executive producer of The Stephanie Miller Show and an occasional actress.
- Erin Hamilton (born August 14, 1968), a singer.

In early 1965 she had a miscarriage while in her ninth week of pregnancy.

Burnett and Hamilton's marriage ended in divorce in 1984. The challenge of coping with Carrie’s drug problems was mentioned as part of the reason for the separation, but the couple took the opportunity to inform other parents about handling such problems and raised money for the clinic in which Carrie was treated. In 1988, Burnett and Carrie took a trip to Moscow to help introduce the first Alcoholics Anonymous branch in the Soviet Union. Joe Hamilton died of cancer in 1991. Also in the 1980s, Burnett participated in a publicity campaign for MedicAlert, of which she is symbolically the one millionth member with the one millionth bracelet.

On November 24, 2001, Burnett married drummer Brian Miller, who is 23 years her junior.

Burnett has enjoyed close friendships with Lucille Ball, Beverly Sills, Jim Nabors (who became the godfather to her daughter Jody), Julie Andrews and Betty White. She is the acting mentor to Vicki Lawrence. They share a close friendship, as noted by Lawrence in a testimonial speech during her appearance at Burnett's 2013 Mark Twain Award in Washington, D.C. (recorded and broadcast on PBS Television).

In August 2020, Burnett and her husband petitioned for guardianship of Burnett's teenage grandson. Burnett was already "educational rights holder", holding the legal right to make decisions about her grandson Dylan's schooling. Burnett and Miller subsequently held temporary guardianship of the child from September 2020 to November 2021, at which point Dylan's case worker assumed the role.

=== Philanthropy ===
In keeping with her promise to the anonymous benefactor who assisted her in 1954, she has contributed to scholarship programs at UCLA and the University of Hawaii to help people in financial need. On November 6, 2025, UCLA announced that Burnett had "endowed a scholarship at the UCLA School of Theater, Film and Television (TFT). The scholarship will support high-potential undergraduate students in the school's Ray Bolger Musical Theater Program." At the same time, she donated more than 140 industry awards and honors and ephemera, which will be displayed on a rotating basis in the lobby of UCLA's Freud Playhouse.

== Discography ==
Recording appearances as a singer:

Solo/duet albums

- Carol Burnett Remembers How They Stopped the Show (1961). Decca. LP, digital.
- Julie and Carol at Carnegie Hall – Julie Andrews and Carol Burnett (1962). Recording from Julie and Carol at Carnegie Hall TV special. Columbia Masterworks. LP, CD, digital.
- Let Me Entertain You: Carol Burnett Sings (1964). Decca. LP, CD, digital.
- Carol Burnett Sings (1967). RCA. LP, CD, digital.
- Here's Carol! Carol Burnett Sings (1968). Vocalion. LP, digital.
- Together Again for the First Time – Carol Burnett and Martha Raye (1968). Tetragrammaton Records. LP.
- Julie and Carol at Lincoln Center – Julie Andrews and Carol Burnett (1971). Recording from Julie and Carol at Lincoln Center TV special. Columbia Masterworks. LP, CD, digital.
- Carol Burnett Featuring 'If I Could Write a Song' (1972). Columbia. LP, CD, digital. (No. 199 US)
- Julie Andrews and Carol Burnett: The CBS Television Specials – Julie Andrews and Carol Burnett (2012). Compilation of albums Julie and Carol at Carnegie Hall and Julie and Carol at Lincoln Center. Masterworks Broadway. CD, digital.

Other recordings

- Once Upon a Mattress – Original Cast Recording (1959). Kapp Records. LP, CD, digital.
- Three Billion Millionaires – Various Artists (1963). United Nations. LP.
- Fade Out – Fade In – Original Broadway Cast (1964). ABC-Paramount. LP, CD, digital.
- Annie: Original Motion Picture Soundtrack – Various Artists (1982). Columbia. LP, CD, digital.
- Follies: In Concert – Various Artists (1985). RCA. LP, CD, digital.
- Sherry! The Broadway Musical – Studio Cast (2004). Angel Records. CD, digital.
- Annie: The Broadway Musical – 30th Anniversary Production – Various Artists (2008). Time Life. CD, digital.

== Bibliography ==
Memoirs

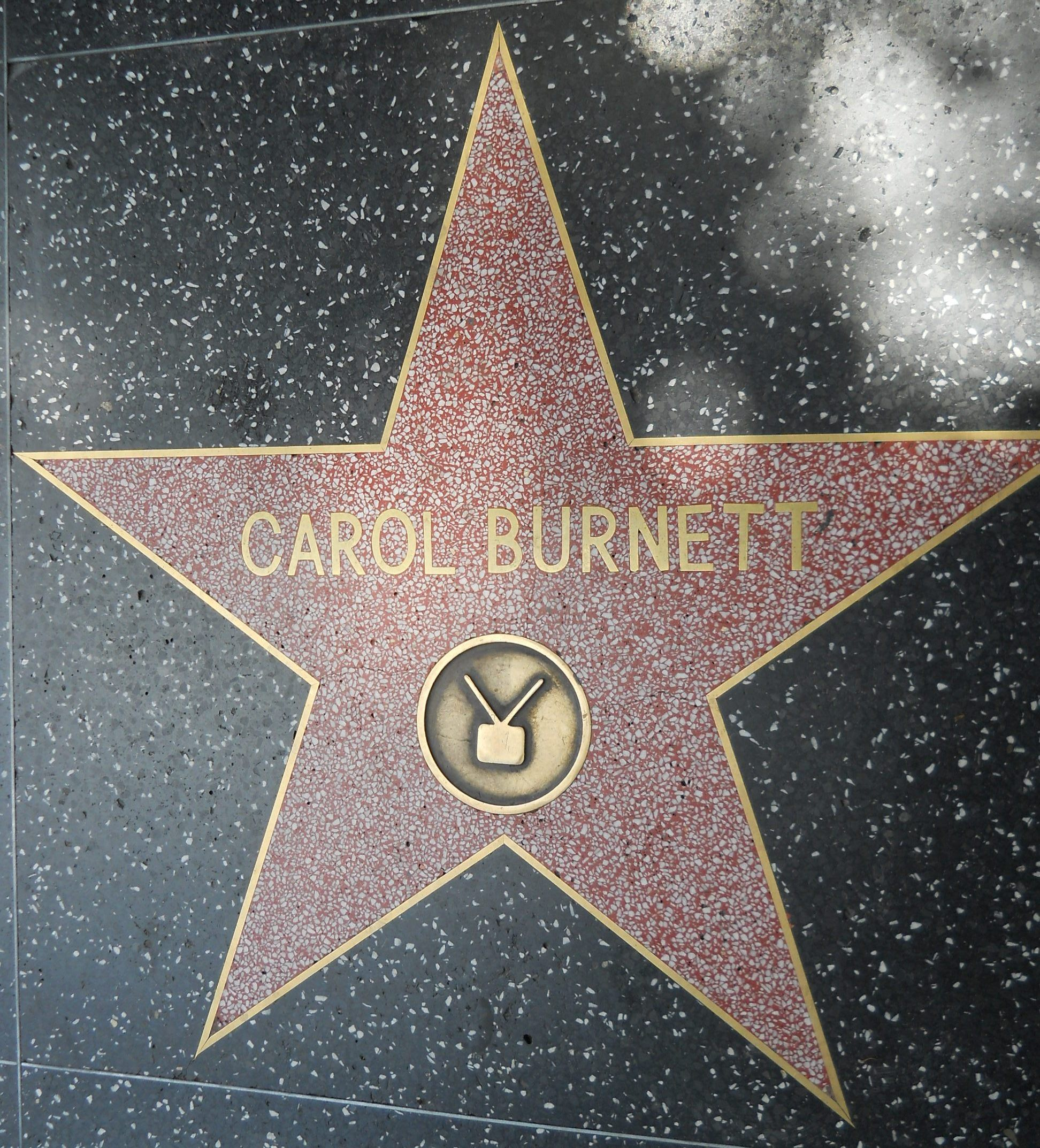
Star on the Hollywood Walk of Fame at 6439 Hollywood Blvd.

Burnett and her oldest daughter, Carrie Hamilton, co-wrote Hollywood Arms (2002), a play based on Burnett's bestselling memoir, One More Time (1986). The show was developed at the 1998 Sundance Theatre Lab and The Goodman Theatre before arriving on Broadway, directed by Harold Prince. Sara Niemietz and Donna Lynne Champlin shared the role of Helen (the character based on Burnett), while Michele Pawk played Louise, Helen's mother, and Linda Lavin played Helen's grandmother. For her performance, Pawk received the 2003 Tony Award for Best Performance by a Featured Actress in a Play. The show received a staging at New York's Merkin Concert Hall in 2015.

Burnett has written and recorded three memoirs, each voice recording receiving a nomination for Grammy Award for Best Spoken Word Album. In Such Good Company won the Grammy for Best Spoken Word at the 59th Grammy Awards.

- This Time Together (2010)
- Carrie and Me (2014)
- In Such Good Company (2016)

Books

- Mendoza, George; Burnett, Carol (1975). What I Want to Be When I Grow Up. New York City: Simon & Schuster. ISBN 978-0671221591.
- Burnett, Carol (1986). One More Time : A Memoir By Carol Burnett (1st ed.). New York City: Random House. ISBN 978-0394552545.
- Burnett, Carol (2011). This Time Together: Laughter and Reflection (Reprint ed.). New York City: Three Rivers Press. ISBN 978-0307461193.
- Burnett, Carol (2014). Carrie and Me: A Mother-Daughter Love Story (Reprint ed.). New York City: Simon & Schuster. ISBN 978-1476755793.
- Burnett, Carol (2016). In Such Good Company: Eleven Years of Laughter, Mayhem, and Fun in the Sandbox. New York City: Crown Archetype. ISBN 978-1101904657.

== Litigation ==
=== Burnett v. National Enquirer, Inc. ===
In 1976, the tabloid newspaper The National Enquirer published an article alleging that Burnett had been drunk and boisterous in public at a restaurant with U.S. Secretary of State Henry Kissinger in attendance. Soon afterwards, it published a retraction stating, "We understand these events did not occur and we are sorry for any embarrassment our report may have caused Miss Burnett". Burnett sued for libel and, after years of litigation, won a judgment against the Enquirer in 1981. Though the initial jury award of $1.6 million was reduced to $200,000 after a series of appeals, and the final settlement was out of court, the event was widely viewed as a historic victory for libel victims of tabloid journalism.

=== Carol Burnett and Whacko, Inc. vs. Twentieth Century Fox Film Corporation ===
In 2007, Burnett and Whacko, Inc. brought a suit against 20th Century Fox demanding at least $2 million in damages after an animated likeness of Burnett appeared in the 2006 episode "Peterotica" of the animated sitcom Family Guy. In the episode, the characters discuss the cleanliness of a porn shop, Glenn Quagmire stating that it is so clean because Burnett works there as a janitor. Burnett is then shown as her charwoman character mopping the floor, while a modified version of The Carol Burnett Show theme tune plays. The lawsuit alleged copyright infringement, violation of publicity rights and misappropriation of Burnett's name and likeness. In addition to damages, Burnett and her company demanded that Fox remove all references to her, the theme and the character. The studio refused. The court ruled in favor of the defendant because the bit was a parody, which is protected by the First Amendment, particularly by fair use doctrine.
