= Golden Globe Carol Burnett Award =

Award in the television industry

- Awarded for: "outstanding contributions to television on or off the screen"
- Country: United States
- Presented by: Golden Globe Foundation
- First award: 2019
- Currently held by: Sarah Jessica Parker (2026)
- Website: goldenglobes.org

The Carol Burnett Award is an honorary Golden Globe Award bestowed by Golden Globe Foundation for "outstanding contributions to television on or off the screen." The Golden Globe Foundation board of directors selects the honorees based on their body of work and the lasting impact that their television career achievements have had on both the industry and audiences. The award is seen as the equivalent to its film accolade counterpart, the Cecil B. DeMille Award. It was first presented at the 76th Golden Globe Awards ceremony in January 2019 and is named in honor of its first recipient, actress and trailblazer Carol Burnett.

The award has been presented annually since 2019, skipping 2022 and 2024. The youngest honoree was television writer, director, and producer Ryan Murphy, at age 57 in 2023. The oldest honoree was television writer and producer Norman Lear, at age 98 in 2021.

== List of honorees ==
Year	Image	Honorees	Nationality	Description	Ref.
2019	Carol Burnett, 2014	Carol Burnett	USA	"A Television Icon, Burnett is an American actress, comedian, singer and writer, whose career spans seven decades of television. She is best known for her groundbreaking comedy variety show, "The Carol Burnett Show". She is the most decorated person in the Golden Globes Television Category, with six wins from 17 nominations. Steve Carell was chosen to present the award to Burnett. She has also won six Primetime Emmy Awards, and is the recipient of the Kennedy Center Honor, Mark Twain Prize, Peabody Award and the Screen Actors Guild Life Achievement Award amongst other honors."	
2020	Ellen DeGeneres, 2011	Ellen DeGeneres	USA	"From her sitcoms, to stand-up, to becoming a household staple on daytime television, she is a pioneer who has captivated audiences for nearly 25 years with her undeniable charm and wit. In addition to her television success, she's an advocate and philanthropist, lending her voice to those who don't have one, and spreading kindness and joy through the power of her platform." Kate McKinnon presented the award to DeGeneres.	
2021	Norman Lear, 2017	Norman Lear	USA	"Norman Lear is among the most prolific creators of this generation. His career has spanned the Golden Age and the streaming era. His progressive approach addressing controversial topics through humor prompted a cultural shift that allowed social and political issues to be reflected in television. His work revolutionized the industry." Ceremony co-host Amy Poehler presented the award to Lear.	
2022	Not awarded (Note: The 2022 awards ceremony was cancelled due a boycott stemming from various media companies, actors, and other creatives over its lack of action to increase the membership diversity of the HFPA. Furthermore, broadcaster NBC announced in May 2021 that the network would refuse to broadcast the ceremony in support of the boycott.)				
2023		Ryan Murphy	USA	"Writer, director, and producer, winner of a Golden Globe and six nominations." Billy Porter presented the award to Murphy.	
2024	Not awarded (Note: No award was presented at the 2024 ceremony to make space for new categories and additional nominees.)				
2025		Ted Danson	USA	"Ted Danson has entertained audiences for decades with his iconic performances that will forever be ingrained in television history," said Helen Hoehne, President of the Golden Globes, via statement. "His renowned career is a testament to his remarkable talent and versatility as an actor and bears resemblance to the award's legendary namesake." Mary Steenburgen (Danson's wife), presented the award to him.	
2026		Sarah Jessica Parker	USA	“Sarah Jessica Parker’s career embodies the very spirit of the Carol Burnett Award,” said Helen Hoehne, president, Golden Globes. “Her trailblazing impact on television and her dedication to storytelling across stage and screen have left an indelible mark on popular culture. We are honored to celebrate her extraordinary contributions to entertainment.” Matthew Broderick (Parker's husband), presented the award.	
