= Cavender Is Coming =

- The Twilight Zone episode
- Episode no.: Season 3 Episode 36
- Directed by: Christian Nyby
- Written by: Rod Serling
- Production code: 4827
- Original air date: May 25, 1962

Guest appearances
- Jesse White; Carol Burnett; Howard Smith; Roy N. Sickner; Frank Behrens; John Fiedler; Sandra Gould; Donna Douglas; Maurice Dallimore

Episode chronology
← Previous "I Sing the Body Electric"	Next → "The Changing of the Guard"
- The Twilight Zone (1959 TV series) (season 3)

"Cavender Is Coming" is episode 101 of the American television anthology series The Twilight Zone. It originally aired on May 25, 1962 on CBS.

== Opening narration ==
Small message of reassurance to that horizontal young lady: Don't despair. Help is en route. It's coming in an odd form from a very distant place, but it's nonetheless coming.

The narration continues after Cavender is assigned as Agnes' guardian angel.

Submitted for your approval, the case of one Miss Agnes Grep, put on Earth with two left feet, an overabundance of thumbs and a propensity for falling down manholes. In a moment she will be up to her jaw in miracles, wrought by apprentice angel Harmon Cavender, intent on winning his wings. And, though it's a fact that both of them should have stood in bed, they will tempt all the fates by moving into the cold, gray dawn of the Twilight Zone.

== Plot ==
Angel Harmon Cavender is assigned to Agnes Grep, a clumsy woman routinely fired from work for her clumsy antics, and tasked with improving her life in 24 hours to earn his wings. As he has taken longer than any other angel to do so, failure in this case means demotion.

Cavender appears beside Agnes on her bus ride home and tries to prove he is her guardian angel by changing the bus into a horse and buggy, then a convertible, and finally back to a bus. Once at home, Agnes is greeted by cookie-loving kids and neighbors who sympathize with her ongoing work woes. When she enters her apartment, she finds Cavender on her couch.

He provides her a mansion, high society friends, and a large bank account to fund it all. Instead of bowling, her former social "high point", she finds herself hosting a lavish party. But she is uncomfortably overwhelmed by the high society chatter, largely incomprehensible to her, and by the obsequious affections of the men. Cavender, meanwhile, indulges himself in alcoholic drinks.

Cavender wakes up on Agnes' mansion couch. He does not see Agnes anywhere and zaps himself to her old apartment, where she glumly tells him that none of her old apartment neighbors recognize her. She tells him she does not want to go back to the mansion and wants her old life back. Cavender argues against the idea, but eventually gives in and zaps her back to her normal life. With excitement, she greets and jokes with all her old friends. She thanks Cavender and he realizes that she is "the richest woman [he] know[s]" and that money does not necessarily equal happiness.

Cavender returns to Heaven to see his boss, who reprimands him for his behavior at the party and for making no change to Agnes' life. But, after looking down on Earth, the boss sees that though her circumstances are unchanged, Agnes is now happy. He realizes Cavender did complete his mission by making Agnes appreciate what she had, and instead of being demoted, he will now help "other deserving subjects". Cavender takes out a cigar and happily leaves the 3rd Celestial Division Angel Placement.

== Closing narration ==
A word to the wise now to any and all who might suddenly feel the presence of a cigar-smoking helpmate who takes bankbooks out of thin air. If you're suddenly aware of any such celestial aids, it means that you're under the beneficent care of one Harmon Cavender, guardian angel. And this message from the Twilight Zone: Lotsa luck!

== Cast ==
- Jesse White as Harmon Cavender
- Carol Burnett as Agnes Grep
- Howard Smith as Polk
- Frank Behrens as Stout
- Roy N. Sickner as Bus Driver
- Sandra Gould as Woman
- John Fiedler as Field Rep #3
- Donna Douglas as Woman #1
- Adrienne Marden as Woman #2
- Maurice Dallimore as Man

== Episode notes ==
This episode was originally broadcast with a laugh track – the only Twilight Zone episode to feature one – because this episode was intended as a backdoor pilot for a regular comedy series featuring the Cavender character. The version included in The Twilight Zone – The Complete Definitive Collection DVD set has the laugh track removed. Reruns airing in the U.S. on Syfy and MeTV also have the laugh track removed as does the version on Netflix.

"Cavender Is Coming" bears strong similarities to the first-season episode "Mr. Bevis". Both episodes are comedies about guardian angels who try to help kindhearted but hapless human beings by giving them everything they think they desire, only to discover that the humans are happier with the way life had been previously. Both episodes were written by Rod Serling.
