= Julie & Carol: Together Again =

- Written by: Mitzie Welch; Ken Welch; Stan Hart
- Directed by: Jeff Margolis
- Starring: Julie Andrews; Carol Burnett
- Music by: Peter Matz
- Country of origin: United States
- Original language: English

Production
- Producers: Ken & Mitzie Welch
- Running time: 60 minutes
- Production companies: Greengage Productions; Kalola Productions

Original release
- Network: ABC
- Release: December 13, 1989

Related
- Julie and Carol at Lincoln Center

Julie & Carol: Together Again is a 1989 American musical comedy television special performed by Julie Andrews and Carol Burnett at the Pantages Theatre in Hollywood. It aired December 13, 1989 on ABC and was directed by Jeff Margolis.

== Background ==
This event marked "25 years after Andrews' and Burnett's first music and comedy special in Carnegie Hall, 18 years since their last at Lincoln Center". Many of the crew had worked with the two on some of their previous projects, including producer-writers Ken and Mitzie Welch, costumer Bob Mackie, and musician-arranger Peter Matz.

Andrews said "The thought over the years, is that we would love to do a series of shows, starting here and then going on to 'Julie & Carol in London,' 'Julie and Carol in Paris,' maybe even in Moscow or at the Great Wall of China."

== Contents ==
The show featured "reminiscences, a rap, an unconventional comic tea party, a medley, and a country-style "Phantom of the Opry." No dancers. No other singers. Just the two of them on stage together performing with a full orchestra."

One of the main themes is growing older. The Morning Call noted: "Now in their mid-fifties, the women sensibly - and they are both sensible women - deal with middle age up front. No longer the young and adored toasts of Broadway as they were when they met - Andrews in My Fair Lady and Burnett in Once Upon a Mattress - they address motherhood and the other changes that time has brought."

== Critical reception ==
The show has received highly positive reviews.

=== Awards ===
Year	Nominee / work	Award	Result
1990	Rene Lagler (production designer)	Primetime Emmy Award for Outstanding Art Direction for a Variety or Music Program	Nominated
1990	Bob Mackie (costume designer)	Primetime Emmy Award for Outstanding Costume Design for a Variety or Music Program	Nominated
1990	Kris Trexler (editor)	Primetime Emmy Award for Outstanding Editing for a Miniseries or a Special - Multi-Camera Production	Nominated
1990	Carol Burnett	American Comedy Award for Funniest Female Performer in a TV Special (Leading or Supporting) Network, Cable or Syndication	Won
