= Went with the Wind! =

1976 comedy sketch on The Carol Burnett Show

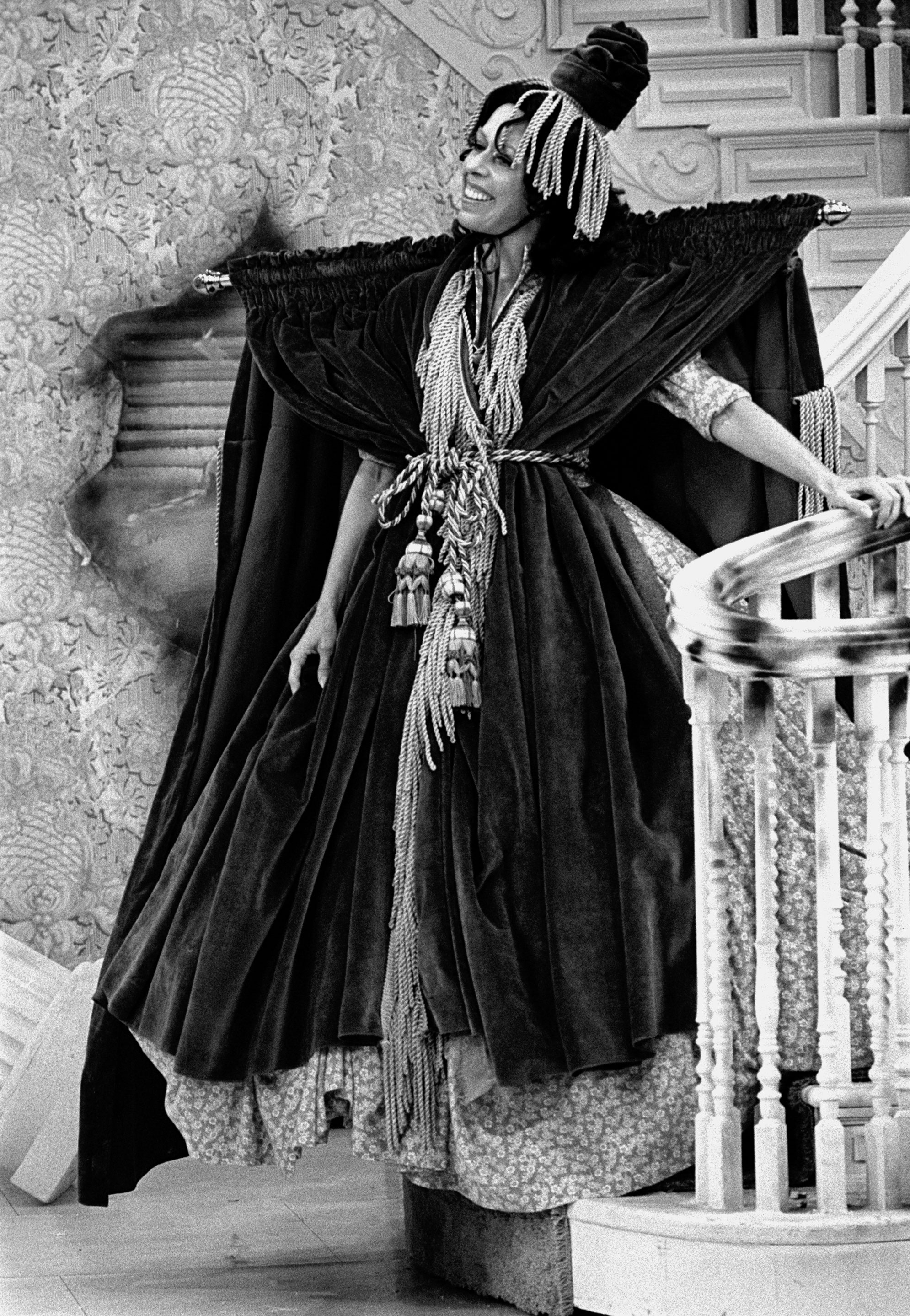
Carol Burnett as Starlett O'Hara in a scene from the "Went with the Wind!" sketch on The Carol Burnett Show (1976)

"Went with the Wind!" is a comedy sketch featured on the eighth episode of the tenth season of The Carol Burnett Show. It originally aired in the United States on CBS on November 13, 1976, and is a parody of the 1939 American historical drama film Gone with the Wind. The sketch was written by two young writers, Rick Hawkins and Liz Sage. In 2009, TV Guide ranked the sketch #53 on its list of "Top 100 Episodes of All Time".

== Cast ==
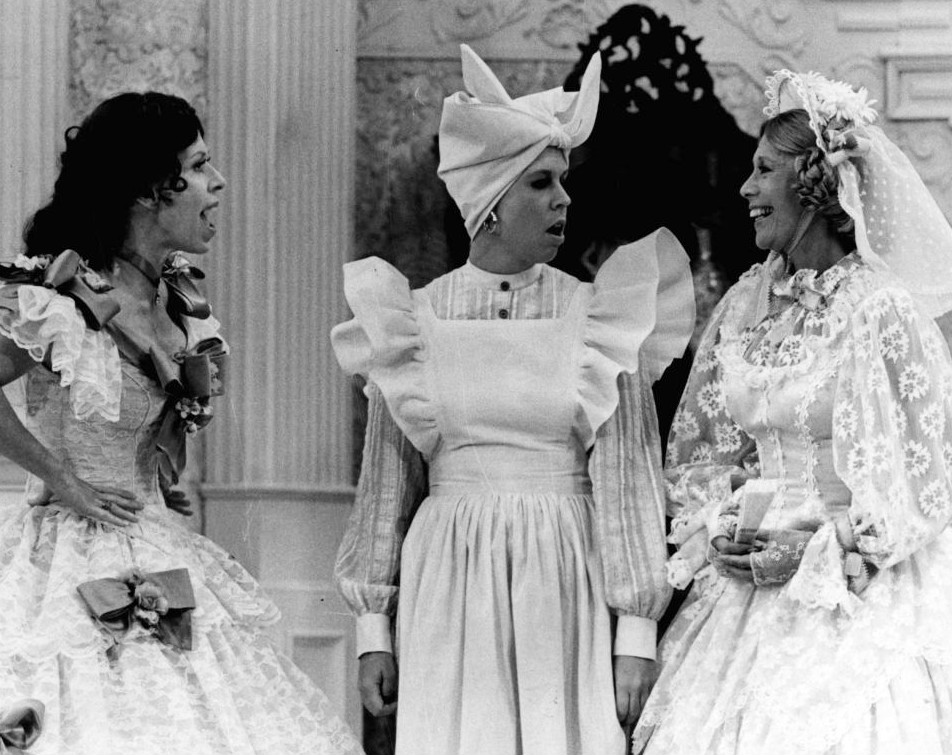
From left to right: Carol Burnett as Starlett, Vicki Lawrence as Sissy, and Dinah Shore as Melody

- Carol Burnett as Starlett O'Hara, a parody of Scarlett O'Hara
- Harvey Korman as Captain Ratt Butler, a parody of Rhett Butler
- Dinah Shore as Melody, a parody of Melanie Hamilton
- Vicki Lawrence as Sissy, a parody of Prissy
- Tim Conway as Brashly, a parody of Ashley Wilkes
- Don Crichton as the Yankee soldier

== Premise ==
Burnett introduces the sketch:

Recently, nearly the entire nation spent a total of five hours watching Gone with the Wind make its TV debut. So for those of you who ran out of Kleenex and were unable to watch it, we put together our own mini-version to let you know what you've missed. Uh-huh.

Part One: Atlanta, Terra Plantation Somewhere in Georgia

Starlett O'Hara hosts a party and greets her guests. Sissy, her house slave, comes to tell Starlett that Brashly Wilkes has arrived. Starlett, infatuated with the clueless Brashly, opens the door to find him introducing her to his cousin, Melody. Starlett begins to express her love for Brashly but her words quickly turn to anger when he informs her that he has married Melody. Upset, Starlett throws a vase, which is caught by the visiting Captain Ratt Butler. The two share a moment, only to be interrupted by the breakout of a war.

Everyone leaves, save for Melody, who announces that she is in labor. Outside, a fire breaks out after Sissy gives a Yankee soldier a match. As Melody gives birth, Starlett delivers her speech about how she will "never go hungry again".

Part Two: Terra Plantation, One War Later

Sissy tells Starlett that the war is over. The Yankee soldier returns to Terra to collect back taxes. Starlett incapacitates the soldier with a chair. Brashly returns and admits that he is broke but Captain Butler has since become a millionaire. Starlett, trying to figure out a way to ask Ratt for the money, quickly pulls down the drapes and goes upstairs to make a dress.

Sissy stalls Ratt briefly, and Starlett descends in her handmade dress, complete with curtain rod, and Ratt professes his love. The Yankee soldier comes to, marries Ratt and Starlett, and is given the back taxes. After an altercation and realizing that Starlett is in love with Brashly, Melody dies but not before she pushes Starlett down the stairs. Brashly leaves, followed by Ratt, who begins to deliver the famous line but Starlett slams the door in his face. Defeated and aimless, Starlett asks Sissy what to do, whereupon Sissy slaps her, stating, "Frankly, Miss Starlett, I don't give a damn".

== Cultural references ==
The sketch made various cultural references including Bobbie Gentry's "Ode to Billie Joe", Tony Orlando and Dawn's "Tie a Yellow Ribbon Round the Ole Oak Tree", "Dixie", "Camptown Races", Chicken of the Sea, A Streetcar Named Desire, and tuna casserole.

== Curtain dress ==
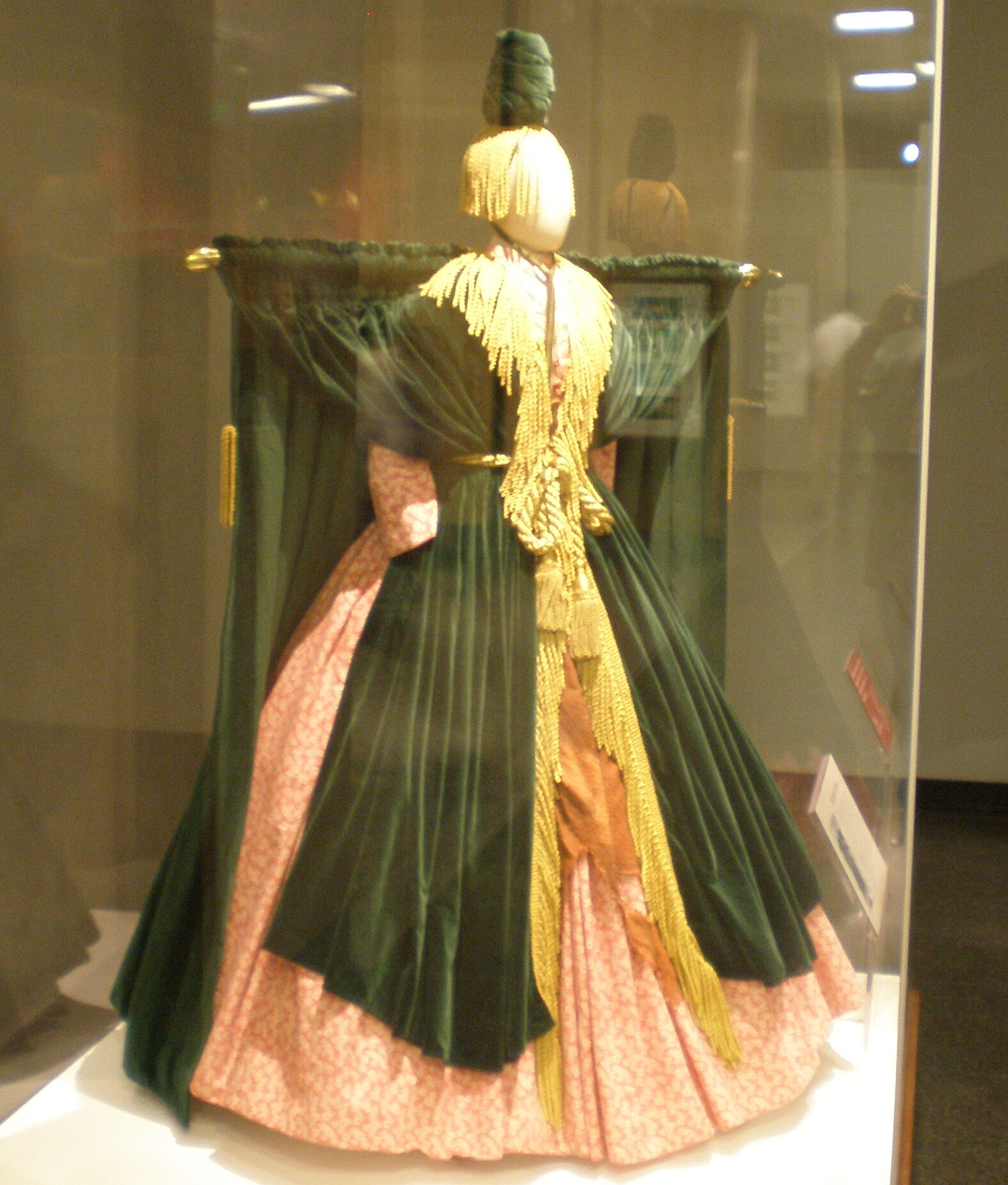
Curtain dress worn by Burnett

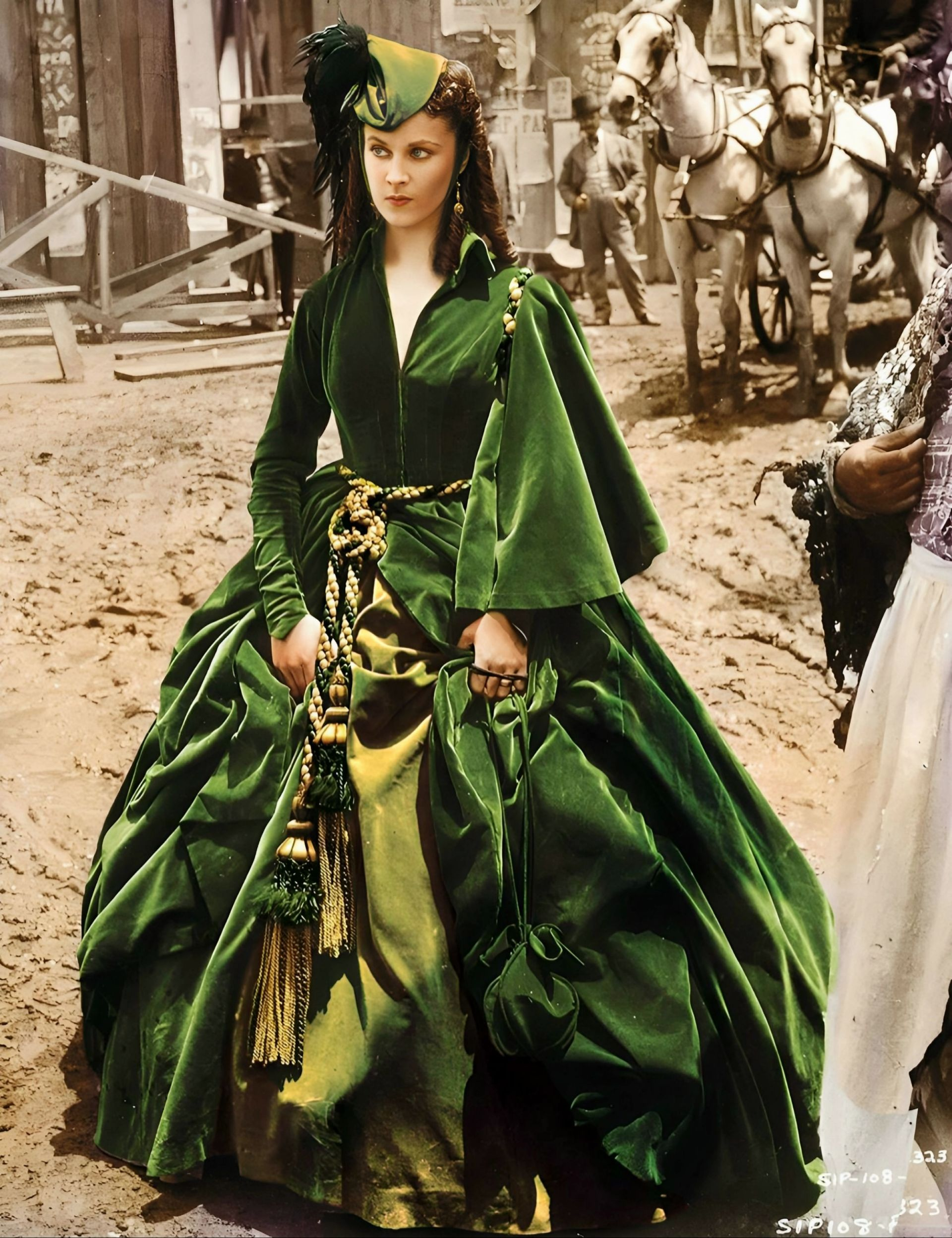
Curtain dress worn in Gone with the Wind

The curtain dress was conceptualized and designed by The Carol Burnett Show costumer Bob Mackie. It parodies a scene in Gone With the Wind in which an impoverished Scarlett refashions a set of green velvet curtains into a dress to wear. The script called for the dress to be hanging off Burnett, but Mackie did not find it funny. He asked the art director for a real curtain rod and green fabric and made the dress on a mannequin. Burnett said that she came into costume fittings and when she saw the curtain rod she said it was the most brilliant sight gag ever.

When Ratt Butler first sees Starlett in her improvised garment, he calls it "gorgeous" and she replies, "Thank you. I saw it in the window, and I just couldn't resist it."

When Burnett descended the staircase, the laughter of the studio audience was so sustained that it had to be edited for broadcast. It was the longest-length audience reaction in the series' entire 11-year run.

In 2009, Mackie and Burnett donated the dress to the National Museum of American History.

== Earlier parodies ==
Exactly nine years earlier to the day, November 13, 1967, The Carol Burnett Show aired a different spoof entitled "Gone with the Breeze". In that sketch, Burnett's character was named "Scarlett O'Fever". Guest star Richard Chamberlain played "Ratt Butler", and Korman appeared as "Uncle Ben".

On another occasion, during a tribute to the films of MGM, a quickie based on Gone With the Wind was performed by Lawrence as Scarlett and Lyle Waggoner as Rhett.

== Legacy ==
The curtain dress scene was named #2 in TV Guide's January 23–29, 1999, list of "The 50 Funniest TV Moments of All Time". The entire outfit, curtain rod and all, is in the collection of the Smithsonian Institution.

In 2009, TV Guide ranked "Went with the Wind!" #53 on its list of "Top 100 Episodes of All Time". That year Mattel released a Starlett doll under the Barbie Celebrity Doll line.

== See also ==
- Gone with the Wind, 1936 novel by Margaret Mitchell
