= Carol Burnett: 90 Years of Laughter + Love =

2023 US television special

- Genre: Variety special
- Starring: Carol Burnett
- Country of origin: United States
- Original language: English

Production
- Executive producers: Mark Bracco; Carol Burnett; Linda Gierahn; Baz Halpin; Brian Miller; Paul Miller; Steve Sauer
- Running time: 84 minutes
- Production company: Silent House Productions

Original release
- Network: NBC / Peacock
- Release: April 26, 2023

Carol Burnett: 90 Years of Laughter + Love is a television special that premiered on NBC on April 26, 2023, honoring the life and career of comedian and actress Carol Burnett. Burnett is known for her work over 60 years as a female comedian, hosting her variety sketch series The Carol Burnett Show from 1967 to 1978. The tribute includes documentary footage, musical performance, clips from her work in film and television, and pre-taped tributes.

The special honors Burnett on her 90th birthday. Various comedians, collaborators, singers, and artists attended, where they performed and spoke about Burnett's work, including Julie Andrews, Vicki Lawrence, Lily Tomlin, Amy Poehler, Ellen DeGeneres, Bob Odenkirk, Steve Carell, Cher and Bob Mackie. The special also featured musical performances from Kristin Chenoweth, Bernadette Peters, Jane Lynch, Billy Porter, Darren Criss, Sutton Foster, and Katy Perry.

The two-hour program premiered on NBC and is available for streaming on Peacock. Interspersed included documentary footage, clips from her film and television work, and pre-taped tributes.

In 2024 at the 75th Primetime Creative Arts Emmy Awards, the special was awarded the Emmy Award for Outstanding Variety Special (Pre-Recorded), and it also received four other Emmy nominations. Also in 2024, Paul Miller received the Directors Guild of America Award for Outstanding Directorial Achievement in Variety/Talk/News/Sports – Specials for the special.

== Participants ==
In order of appearance:

=== Tributes ===
- Steve Carell
- Sheryl Lee Ralph
- Lily Tomlin
- Julie Andrews
- Amy Poehler
- Vicki Lawrence
- Charlize Theron
- Sofia Vergara
- Marisa Tomei as Mrs. Wiggins
- Bob Mackie
- Lisa Kudrow
- Melissa Rauch
- Cher
- Bob Odenkirk
- Kristen Wiig
- Allison Janney
- Laura Dern
- Ellen DeGeneres

=== Musical performers ===
- Kristin Chenoweth and Bernadette Peters
- Jane Lynch, Bernadette Peters, Billy Porter, and Aileen Quinn
- Darren Criss and Sutton Foster
- Katy Perry

=== Pre-taped ===
- Dolly Parton
- Oprah Winfrey
- Former First Lady Michelle Obama
- Steve Martin and Martin Short
- Bill Hader
- Jimmy Fallon
- President Joe Biden and First Lady Jill Biden
- Stephen Colbert
- Tina Fey

== Production ==
Burnett stated, "Rather than a birthday bash or whatever with candles and balloons, I wanted a show like you haven't seen in a long time, with a 19-piece orchestra, singers and wonderful music. I wanted a variety show". The special was recorded on March 3, 2023, at the Avalon Hollywood in Los Angeles.

The telecast aired on NBC on April 26, 2023. It was available to stream on Peacock. The special drew 7.3 million viewers, becoming the most-watched program that night and the fourth-highest-rated entertainment program of the season to that point.

== Reception ==
Marianne Garvey of CNN described the special as "elegant" and "hilarious".

=== Accolades ===
Year	Award	Category	Nominee(s)	Result	Ref.
2023	Primetime Creative Arts Emmy Awards	Outstanding Variety Special (Pre-Recorded)		Won	
2023	Primetime Creative Arts Emmy Awards	Outstanding Production Design For a Variety Special	Tamlyn Wright and Travis Deck	Nominated	
2023	Primetime Creative Arts Emmy Awards	Outstanding Directing For a Variety Special	Paul Miller	Nominated	
2023	Primetime Creative Arts Emmy Awards	Outstanding Picture Editing For Variety Programming	Mike Polito and Timothy Schultz	Nominated	
2023	Primetime Creative Arts Emmy Awards	Outstanding Writing For a Variety Special	Jon Macks and Carol Leifer	Nominated	
