= Moon Over Buffalo =

Play

- Written by: Ken Ludwig
- Characters: George Hay, Charlotte Hay, Rosalind, Howard, Paul, Ethel, Richard, Eileen
- Setting: Buffalo, New York

Moon Over Buffalo is a 1995 comic play by Ken Ludwig set in Buffalo, New York in 1953. This play marked the return, after a 30-year absence, of Carol Burnett to the Broadway stage.

== Characters ==
- George Hay, a traveling actor.
- Charlotte Hay, George's wife and actress in his company.
- Rosalind "Roz" Hay, George & Charlotte's daughter, who left the stage to lead a "normal" life.
- Howard, a TV weatherman and Rosalind's fiancé.
- Paul Singer, stage manager for George's company, and Rosalind's ex-fiancé.
- Ethel, Charlotte's nearly-deaf mother.
- Richard Maynard, a love sick lawyer who is courting Charlotte.
- Eileen, an actress in George's company who was George's "one-night stand."

== Overview ==
Moon Over Buffalo relies heavily on situation comedy for its humor, as well as some sexual innuendo and a little slapstick. The actor who plays George, in particular, must be able to deliver a highly physical performance; George engages in a mock fencing match with Charlotte, a wrestling match with Howard, and a stunt fall into the orchestra pit. The action and dialogue are fast-paced, as the characters are constantly bickering or frantically trying to resolve some confusion. It bears numerous similarities to Ludwig's previous farce, Lend Me A Tenor: period time-frame, Northeastern city, drinking-and-womanizing male star, justifiably jealous wife, young stage manager desperately trying to keep things together, important person(s) in the audience, at least one character who's passed out and is believed missing, non-actors forced to go onstage, etc.

George and Charlotte Hay, traveling actors, are performing Cyrano de Bergerac and Private Lives in a repertory theatre in Buffalo. Charlotte has grandiose dreams of becoming a Hollywood film star; George, on the other hand, is quite satisfied as a stage actor, and sees live theater as being superior to film.

George receives a phone call from Frank Capra, a very famous film director, who says that he needs replacements for Ronald Colman and Greer Garson, the two stars of his current film, The Twilight of The Scarlet Pimpernel, and that he plans to see one of George's shows and consider George and Charlotte for the parts. Charlotte, however, doesn't believe George when he gives the news; she has just learned that George has had an affair with one of their actors, Eileen, and that Eileen is pregnant with George's child. Charlotte tells George she plans to leave with Richard, a successful and charismatic lawyer. George, despondent, gives up hope and turns to alcohol to drown his misery.

When Charlotte reads the news about Capra losing his actors, she returns to the theater, only to find that George has left. Charlotte and Rosalind (their daughter who has recently come to visit) contact all the bars in the city, looking for him. They can't find him, but Charlotte does meet Howard, Roz's new fiancé, whom Charlotte's hard-of-hearing mother mistakenly introduces as Frank Capra. Thinking that Howard is the famous director, Charlotte gives him the "red carpet" treatment, for which Howard is grateful, but confused. And when George returns, he believes that Howard is actually Eileen's brother, seeking revenge for George's affair with Eileen. In what he thinks is self-defense, George ties up the innocent Howard and locks him in a closet.

When Charlotte and Roz finally meet George again, they try to get him prepared for the afternoon's showing of Private Lives, which Capra intends to see. George, in his drunken stupor, decides he would rather do Cyrano, and dresses appropriately. The resulting show is a disaster, as George is several minutes late to arrive onstage and in the wrong costume and character. In the end, Howard, still bound in ropes, hops onstage and calls out for help; then George falls into the orchestra pit, presumably breaking a few instruments and sending him to the hospital.

After the show, a sober George offers his apology to Howard. Brushing that aside, Howard announces that he has met an old love and in walks Eileen. Howard and Eileen have decided to get engaged and eagerly plan to start a family right away. Everyone is relieved... and happy. Now that Roz is single, Paul takes the opportunity to propose to her, and they get engaged again on the spot. Charlotte forgives — or at least forgets — George's infidelity and decides to stay with him instead of Richard. Finally, in a deus ex machina-like plot twist, Capra himself calls to say that he missed the afternoon performance and will instead see the show in the evening, thus allowing George and Charlotte another chance at Hollywood stardom.

== Productions ==
Directed by Tom Moore, Moon Over Buffalo opened on Broadway at the Martin Beck Theatre on October 1, 1995, where it ran for 309 performances, after 22 previews and an out-of-town tryout in Boston. Philip Bosco was nominated for the Tony Award, Best Actor in a Play and Carol Burnett was nominated for the Tony Award, Best Actress in a Play.

The play opened in London at the Old Vic under the title Over The Moon in October 2001. Directed by Ray Cooney, the cast starred Frank Langella and Joan Collins.

The D.A. Pennebaker documentary entitled Moon Over Broadway follows the show from rehearsal period through Broadway opening. The film documents the time during rehearsal when the play had to be stopped due to a technical problem and Burnett "for half an hour just did the Carol Burnett Show. She's born to be out there."

== Original Broadway cast ==
Source: New York Times

- George Hay – Philip Bosco
- Charlotte Hay – Carol Burnett
- Rosalind – Randy Graff
- Ethel – Jane Connell
- Paul – Dennis Ryan
- Eileen – Kate Miller
- Howard – Andy Taylor
- Richard Maynard – James Valentine

During the original run, Carol Burnett and Philip Bosco were temporarily replaced by Lynn Redgrave and Robert Goulet while on extended vacations.

== Awards and nominations ==
=== Original Broadway production ===
Year	Award	Category	Nominee	Result
1996	Tony Award	Best Actor in a Play	Philip Bosco	Nominated
1996	Tony Award	Best Actress in a Play	Carol Burnett	Nominated
