= Julie and Carol at Carnegie Hall =

US television special, broadcast 1962

- Title card
- Genre: Variety
- Written by: Mike Nichols; Ken Welch
- Directed by: Joe Hamilton
- Starring: Julie Andrews; Carol Burnett
- Country of origin: United States

Production
- Producer: Bob Banner
- Production location: Carnegie Hall
- Running time: 60 minutes
- Production company: Bob Banner Associates

Original release
- Network: CBS
- Release: June 11, 1962

Related
- Julie and Carol at Lincoln Center

Julie and Carol at Carnegie Hall is an American musical comedy television special starring Julie Andrews and Carol Burnett, broadcast on CBS on June 11, 1962.

== Development ==
The special was produced by Bob Banner and directed by Joe Hamilton. Banner came up with the idea in the Fall of 1961. Burnett was then a regular on The Garry Moore Show and Andrews had appeared as a guest twice, performing the song "Big D" from the musical The Most Happy Fella in the first appearance; and in the show's 1961 Christmas special, she did a number with Burnett and fellow guest Gwen Verdon plus an early performance of "My Favorite Things" (three years before she performed it as Maria while filming The Sound of Music).

Burnett tells an anecdote about the development of the special. CBS programming executives Michael Dann and Oscar Katz were reluctant to approve it. They believed Andrews did not have sufficient name recognition and with Burnett appearing weekly on Moore's show the public would not tune in. Following a CBS promotional event, Burnett was unable to hail a taxi. Dann and Katz offered to wait until one appeared but Burnett said not to bother, that a truck driver would appear shortly and offer her a ride. Almost instantly a trucker appeared and offered Burnett a ride. Burnett received a telephone call from Katz immediately upon arriving home. Taking the trucker incident as a sign, he approved the special.

Mike Nichols wrote the script and co-wrote the song "You're So London" with Ken Welch. Writing began in February 1962 and the stars rehearsed for two weeks before the March 5 taping. Irwin Kostal was the musical director. George Fenneman served as the announcer. Burnett introduced the song "Meantime", written by Robert Allen and Al Stillman.

== Program ==
1. "No Mozart Tonight" – Carol Burnett
2. "You're So London" – Carol Burnett and Julie Andrews
3. "Oh Dear! What Can the Matter Be?" – Julie Andrews
4. "From Russia: The Nausiev Ballet" – Carol Burnett and Julie Andrews, with ensemble: "There's No Business Like Show Business"; "The Girl That I Marry"; "Doin' What Comes Natur'lly"
5. "Meantime" – Carol Burnett
6. "From Switzerland: The Pratt Family" – Carol Burnett and Julie Andrews, with ensemble: "Pratt Family Tree"; "The Things We Like Best"; "Ding Dong Yum Yum Yum" (A musical parody of Broadway’s ’Sound of Music’)
7. "History of Musical Comedy" – Carol Burnett and Julie Andrews (medley sung variously as duets, alternating, or in musical counterpoint): "Every Little Movement"; "Ah! Sweet Mystery of Life"; "Tramp, Tramp, Tramp"; "Look for the Silver Lining"; "Limehouse Blues"; "Funny Face"; "Fidgety Feet"; "'S Wonderful"; "Hallelujah!"; "Why Was I Born?"; "Don't Ever Leave Me"; "Dancing in the Dark"; "I Get a Kick Out of You"; "Night and Day"; "Where or When"; "Lucky Day"; "Yesterdays"; "Get Out of Town"; "Glad to Be Unhappy"; "I've Got You Under My Skin"; "Begin the Beguine"; "I Cain't Say No"; "Wouldn't It Be Loverly"; "A Boy Like That"; "I Have a Love"
8. "From Texas: Big D" – Carol Burnett and Julie Andrews, with ensemble
9. "You're So London" (reprise) – Carol Burnett and Julie Andrews

Andrews and Burnett each perform one satirical interstitial in which each damns the other with faint praise; Burnett explains Andrews's disappointment at not being allowed to perform "Ol' Man River" in her "natural" bass voice while Andrews explains Burnett's sorrow at not getting to perform Mark Antony's speech from Julius Caesar.

== Critical response ==
Julie and Carol at Carnegie Hall received mixed critical reviews. Billboard described the material as "warm and delightful" and noted "the hilarious hand of Mike Nichols" throughout. While describing the performance at taping as "smooth" and "scintillating", Cynthia Lowry of the Associated Press criticized the material, direction and photography of the program as aired, writing "after gay, funny starts the comedy plummeted to banana-peel level".

Julie and Carol at Carnegie Hall received the 1963 Emmy Award for Outstanding Program Achievement in the Field of Music. For her performance here along with her performance in 1963's An Evening with Carol Burnett, Burnett won the Emmy for Outstanding Performance in a Variety or Musical Program or Series. The program also won the 1963 Rose d'Or Light Entertainment Festival Golden Rose.

Columbia Records released an LP record of the special in June 1962. It peaked at number 85 on the Billboard chart.

Andrews and Burnett re-teamed for Julie and Carol at Lincoln Center (1971) and Julie & Carol: Together Again (1989).
