= I'll Be (album) =

Compilation album by Reba McEntire
- Released: October 9, 2000
- Genre: Country
- Length: 1:00:00
- Label: MCA
- Producer: Jimmy Bowen; Tony Brown; Reba McEntire; Michael Omartian

Reba McEntire chronology
So Good Together (1999)	I'll Be (2000)	Greatest Hits Vol. 3: I'm a Survivor (2001)

I'll Be is a compilation album by Reba McEntire, released October 9, 2000, on MCA Nashville, exclusively in Europe. The album peaked at #134 on the UK Albums Chart. This album has every song from her 21st studio album Starting Over, except "You Keep Me Hangin' On".

== Track listing ==
No.	Title	Writer(s)	Length
1.	"If I Fell"	John Lennon, Paul McCartney	2:59
2.	"I'll Be"	Diane Warren
3.	"What If" (Edit)	Warren	3:30
4.	"By the Time I Get to Phoenix"	Jimmy Webb	4:02
5.	"On My Own" (feat. Trisha Yearwood, Martina McBride, and Linda Davis)	Burt Bacharach, Carole Bayer Sager	4:33
6.	"You're No Good"	Clint Ballard Jr.	3:33
7.	"Starting Over Again"	Bruce Sudano, Donna Summer	4:11
8.	"Please Come to Boston"	Dave Loggins	4:40
9.	"Ring on Her Finger, Time on Her Hands"	Don Goodman, Mary Ann Kennedy, Pamela Rose	4:13
10.	"New Fool at an Old Game"	Steve Board, Rick Giles, Sheila Stephen	3:48
11.	"I Won't Mention It Again"	Cam Mullins, Carolyn Jean Yates	4:14
12.	"Five Hundred Miles Away from Home"	Bobby Bare, Heddy West, Charlie Williams	4:24
13.	"Talking in Your Sleep"	Roger Cook, Bobby Wood	4:24
14.	"What Do You Say"	Michael Dulaney, Neil Thrasher	3:30
15.	"We're So Good Together"	Bob DiPiero, Annie Roboff, John Scott Sherrill	3:31

== Sales chart positions ==
Chart (2000)	Peak position
UK Albums Chart	134

=== Certifications and sales ===
Country	Certification (thresholds)	Sales
United Kingdom		37,000
