= Ships in the Night =

Ships in the Night may refer to:

== Film and television ==
- "Ships in the Night", a 1984 episode of Automan
- "Ships in the Night", a 2011 episode of NCIS
- "Ships in the Night", a 2021 television film installment of the Martha's Vineyard Mysteries series

== Music ==
- Ships in the Night (musician), American electronic music project
- "Ships in the Night" (Mat Kearney song), 2011
- Ships in the Night, a 1974 album by Vicki Lawrence
  - "Ships in the Night" (Vicki Lawrence song), 1973
- "Ships in the Night", a 1976 song by Be-Bop Deluxe

== Publications ==
- Ships in the Night, a 1993 novella by Jack McDevitt

== See also ==
- Ships of the Night, a 1928 silent adventure film directed by Duke Worne
