= I'll Be =

I'll Be may refer to:

- "I'll Be" (Celine Dion song)
- "I'll Be" (Edwin McCain song)
- "I'll Be" (Foxy Brown song)
- "I'll Be" (Reba McEntire song)
- I'll Be (album), a 2000 compilation album by Reba McEntire
