= It Could Have Been Me =

Single by Sami Jo

from the album It Could Have Been Me
- B-side: "Look at Us"
- Released: July 1974
- Recorded: 1974
- Genre: Pop
- Length: 3:17
- Label: MGM South
- Songwriters: Gloria Sklerov, Harry Lloyd
- Producers: S. Limbo, M. Buckins

Sami Jo singles chronology
"Tell Me a Lie" (1974)	"It Could Have Been Me" (1974)	"I'll Believe Anything You Say" (1975)

"It Could Have Been Me" is a song written by Gloria Sklerov and Harry Lloyd . The song was originally recorded by Vicki Lawrence in 1972. Though not released as a single, it was included on her debut LP, The Night the Lights Went Out in Georgia.

"It Could Have Been Me" is a torch song, with the singer expressing regrets about separating from her erstwhile love upon witnessing his marriage to another woman. She awakens to learn that it was only a dream, and that he is her fiancé.

== Sami Jo Cole recording ==
In 1974 song was recorded by Sami Jo Cole. It became a pop hit in both the U.S. (#46) and Canada (#45). It was a bigger hit on the Adult Contemporary charts, reaching #31 and #12 in those nations, respectively. It was the follow-up to her debut hit, "Tell Me a Lie," and both songs were released in advance of her first LP.

== Chart history ==
=== Weekly charts ===
Chart (1974/75)	Peak position
Australia (Kent Music Report)	68
Canada RPM Top Singles	45
Canada RPM Adult Contemporary	12
U.S. Billboard Hot 100	46
U.S. Billboard Adult Contemporary	31
U.S. Billboard Country	61
U.S. Cash Box Top 100	49
