= Greatest Hits Volume III: I'm a Survivor =

Greatest hits album by Reba McEntire
- Released: October 23, 2001
- Studios: Emerald Sound Studios, Ocean Way Nashville and Seventeen Grand Recording (Nashville, Tennessee)
- Genre: Country
- Length: 56:24
- Label: MCA
- Producers: Tony Brown; Tim DuBois; John Guess; Alison Krauss; David Malloy; Reba McEntire

Reba McEntire chronology
So Good Together (1999)	Greatest Hits Volume III: I'm a Survivor (2001)	20th Century Masters – The Christmas Collection: The Best of Reba (2003)

Singles from Greatest Hits Volume III: I'm a Survivor
- 1. "I'm a Survivor" Released: July 5, 2001; 2. "Sweet Music Man" Released: January 2002

Professional ratings
Review scores
Source	Rating
Allmusic	4/5 stars

Greatest Hits Volume III: I'm a Survivor is the third greatest hits compilation released by Reba McEntire. It is her third compilation album following Reba McEntire's Greatest Hits (1987) and Greatest Hits Volume Two (1993). It was released on October 23, 2001, via MCA Nashville. The compilation includes 12 of McEntire's hit singles of the 1990's decades, along with three newly recorded tracks.

The lead single, "I'm a Survivor", was released in July 2001; the song would also become the theme song for her TV show Reba (2001–2007) albeit in an alternate version. It was a huge hit, peaking at number three on the US Hot Country Songs chart and becoming one of her signature hits. McEntire's cover of Kenny Rogers's 1977 single "Sweet Music Man" was a moderate hit, peaking at number 36.

The album debuted atop the Billboard Top Country Albums chart on November 10, 2001 with first week sales of 147,000 copies.

== Track listing ==
No.	Title	Writer(s)	Length
1.	"I'm a Survivor"	Shelby Kennedy, Philip White	2:59
2.	"Forever Love"	Deanna Bryant, Liz Hengber, Sunny Russ	3:50
3.	"The Heart Is a Lonely Hunter"	Kim Williams, Ed Hill, Mark D. Sanders	3:47
4.	"And Still"	Hengber, Tommy Lee James	3:23
5.	"If You See Him/If You See Her" (duet with Brooks & Dunn)	James, Jennifer Kimball, Terry McBride	3:53
6.	"The Night the Lights Went Out in Georgia"	Bobby Russell	4:12
7.	"Fallin' Out of Love"	Jon Ims	4:31
8.	"The Heart Won't Lie" (duet with Vince Gill)	Kim Carnes, Donna Weiss	3:18
9.	"Take It Back"	Kristy Jackson	3:13
10.	"She Thinks His Name Was John"	Sandy Knox, Steve Rosen	4:17
11.	"The Fear of Being Alone"	Walt Aldridge, Bruce Miller	2:59
12.	"Why Haven't I Heard from You"	T. W. Hale, Knox	3:25
13.	"One Honest Heart"	Gary Baker, David Malloy, Frank J. Myers	3:51
14.	"Myself Without You"	Bob DiPiero, Victoria Shaw	4:19
15.	"Sweet Music Man"	Kenny Rogers	3:27

== Personnel ==
Musicians (Tracks 1, 14 & 15)

- Reba McEntire – lead vocals
- Steve Nathan – keyboards (1, 14)
- Matt Rollings – keyboards (1, 14)
- Gary Smith – acoustic piano (15)
- Steve Gibson – electric guitars (1, 14)
- Ron Block – guitars (15)
- Chris Thile – bouzouki (15)
- Jerry Douglas – dobro (15)
- Michael Rhodes – bass (1, 14)
- Barry Bales – bass (15)
- Paul Leim – drums (1, 14)
- Jim Keltner – drums (15)
- Alison Krauss – violin (15), harmony vocals (15)
- Kim Parent – backing vocals (1, 14)
- Russell Terrell – backing vocals (1, 14)

== Production ==
- Reba McEntire – producer (1–4, 6–14)
- Tony Brown – producer (1, 3–10, 12, 14)
- David Malloy – producer (2, 13)
- Tim DuBois – producer (5)
- John Guess – producer (11)
- Alison Krauss – producer (15)
- Cindy Owen – art direction
- George Holz – photography
- Rob Van Dorssen – hair, make-up
- Freddie Leiba – stylist
- Lon Helton – liner notes
- Narvel Blackstock for Starstruck Entertainment – representative

Technical credits

- Hank Williams – assembling and mastering at MasterMix (Nashville, Tennessee)
- Justin Niebank – recording (1, 14), mixing (1, 14), overdub recording (1, 14)
- Steve Marcantonio – overdub recording (1, 14)
- Gary Paczosa – recording (15), mixing (15)
- Jason Lehning – digital editing (15)
- Chad Brown – overdub assistant (1, 14)
- Leslie Richter – overdub assistant (1, 14)
- Thomas Johnson – recording assistant (15)

== Charts ==
=== Weekly charts ===
Chart (2001)	Peak position
US Billboard 200	18
US Top Country Albums (Billboard)	1

=== Year-end charts ===
Chart (2001)	Position
US Top Country Albums (Billboard)	59
Chart (2002)	Position
US Top Country Albums (Billboard)	24

=== Certifications and sales ===
Region	Certification	Certified units/sales
United States (RIAA)	Gold	500,000^{^}
^{^} Shipments figures based on certification alone.

=== Singles ===
Billboard (North America)

Year	Single	Peak positions	
Year	Single	US Country	US
2001	"I'm a Survivor"	3	49
2002	"Sweet Music Man"	36	—
