= Ships in the Night (Vicki Lawrence song) =

Single by Vicki Lawrence

from the album Ships in the Night
- B-side: "Sensual Man"
- Released: June 1973
- Genre: Easy listening, pop
- Length: 3:03
- Label: Bell
- Songwriter: Bobby Russell
- Producer: Snuff Garrett

Vicki Lawrence singles chronology
"He Did With Me" (1973)	"Ships in the Night" (1973)	"Mama's Gonna Make it All Better" (1974)

"Ships in the Night" is a 1973 song by American singer-actress Vicki Lawrence. It was the first of two singles included on her 1974 Ships in the Night LP. It is a waltz done in 3/4 time.

The song reached No. 7 on the Australian Kent Music Report. It peaked at No. 18 in New Zealand. In the United States it hit No. 49 on the Adult Contemporary chart.

"Ships in the Night" was included on the compilation album, Explosive Hits 74. The B-side, "Sensual Man," is a track from Lawrence's previous LP, The Night the Lights Went Out in Georgia.

== Chart performance ==
=== Weekly charts ===
Chart (1973–74)	Peak position
Australia (Kent Music Report)	7
New Zealand (Listener)	18
U.S. Billboard Easy Listening	49

=== Year-end charts ===
Chart (1974)	Rank
Australia (Kent Music Report)	40
