= The Night the Lights Went Out in Georgia (album) =

Studio album by Vicki Lawrence
- Released: April 21, 1973
- Recorded: United (Hollywood)
- Genre: Country pop
- Length: 32:34
- Label: Bell
- Producer: Snuff Garrett

Vicki Lawrence chronology
The Night the Lights Went Out in Georgia (1973)	Ships in the Night (1974)

The Night the Lights Went Out in Georgia is the 1973 debut album by Vicki Lawrence, recorded and released on Bell Records. It features the US and Canadian number-one single and title track "The Night the Lights Went Out in Georgia", written by Bobby Russell. Another song, "He Did with Me", reached number one in Australia.

This album also features a few cover songs, such as Cher's "Gypsys, Tramps & Thieves", Roger Miller's "Little Green Apples" and Lori Lieberman's "Killing Me Softly with His Song". The album was released on LP, cassette tape, 8-track and open reel stereo tape. Later, in 2003 the first CD release minus the original cover artwork was released by Snuff Garret Music, Inc.

== Track listing ==
All songs written by Bobby Russell except where noted.

Side one

1. "The Night the Lights Went Out in Georgia"
2. "Mr. Allison"
3. "Killing Me Softly with His Song" (Charles Fox & Norman Gimbel & Lori Lieberman)
4. "Sensual Man" (Annette Tucker & Jan Rado)
5. "Little Green Apples"
6. "He Did with Me" (Gloria Sklerov & Harry Lloyd)

Side two

1. "(For a While) We Helped Each Other Out"
2. "It Could Have Been Me" (Gloria Sklerov & Harry Lloyd)
3. "Dime a Dance" (Bob Stone)
4. "Gypsys, Tramps & Thieves" (Bob Stone)
5. "How You Gonna Stand It"

== Personnel ==
=== Musicians ===
- Vocals by Vicki Lawrence
- Music played by the Wrecking Crew

=== Production ===
- Arrangement – Artie Butler, Larry Muhoberac
- Art direction – Beverly Weinstein
- Design – Ken Kim, Woody Woodward
- Engineer – Eric Prestidge, Jerry Barnes
- Liner notes – Carol Burnett
- Producer – Snuff Garrett

Credits

- Tracks 1, 2, 5, and 11 published by Pixruss Music
- Track 3 published by Fox-Gimbel Productions
- Track 4, 6 and 9 published by Senor Music
- Track 7 published by Russell-Cason Music
- Tracks 9 and 10 published by Peso Music
- Recorded at United / Western Recording, Hollywood, CA
- Mastered at Artisan Sound Recorders

== Charts ==
Chart (1973)	Peak position
US Billboard 200	51
