= Sami Jo =

American singer (born 1947)

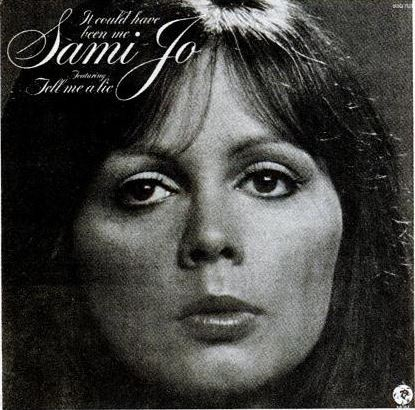
Sami Jo, c. 1975

Sami Jo (born Jane Annette Jobe on May 9, 1947 in Batesville, Arkansas) is an American former singer. She is best known for her 1974 single "Tell Me a Lie", which peaked at No. 21 on the Pop Top 40 that same year. The song also peaked at number 43 in Australia.

Sami Jo was raised in a religious family in Batesville, AR. She began singing on local radio at age 3 and was also a local beauty queen during high school. When she was 19 she moved to Dallas, where she acquired the nickname "Sam" from a roommate, which eventually turned into "Sami Jo".

Her early career was guided by Atlanta music legend Sonny Limbo. He connected Sami Jo with Rick Hall in Muscle Shoals, AL, where she recorded two singles that failed to chart. Sonny then got her a deal with MGM South, which led to Sami Jo's first hit, "Tell Me A Lie". In addition to reaching #21 on Billboard's Hot 100 singles chart, it also reached #14 on Billboard's Easy Listening chart. Her follow-up single, "It Could Have Been Me", also did well, reaching #46 pop and #31 easy listening. Her first album, also entitled It Could Have Been Me, peaked at #33 on the U.S. Country Albums chart.

Despite this early success, Sami Jo did not achieve another major hit on either the pop or the country charts. In 1975, after MGM South was folded into its parent label, MGM Records, Sami Jo charted one record ("I'll Believe Anything You Say") at #62 on Billboard's Top Country Singles chart. When MGM Records was merged into Polydor Records, Sami Jo continued recording for the new label, achieving two minor country hits ("God Loves Us" and "Take Me To Heaven") in 1976, working with Jimmy Bowen as her producer.

After these two singles, Sami Jo was dropped by her label. She was signed to Elektra/Asylum's country division in 1981 by its president, her former producer Jimmy Bowen. Even though her recordings were produced by Bowen, neither of her two charting singles ("One Love Over Easy" and a remake of Eddie Rabbitt's "I Can't Help Myself") cracked the top 70 on the country chart. In 1983, Elektra stopped recording country music and transferred the artists it recorded in the genre (including Sami Jo) to Warner Bros. Records. She worked with producer Jim Ed Norman (best known for his work with Anne Murray) on a remake of Brenda Lee's "Emotions", but Warner Bros. recalled the single soon after sending promo singles to radio stations. She also recorded some tracks for the Southern Tracks label, but none charted.

After her music career ended, Sami Jo managed two stores in Tulsa, OK.

She has a son, Tony, and a grandson, Maximus.

Sami Jo Cole Website: http://www.samijocole.com/index.html

"Tell Me a Lie" was later covered in 1983 by recording artist Janie Fricke, who turned the song into a No. 1 Country hit.

== Additional information ==
In-depth interview with Sami Jo: http://www.hollywoodstarletbarbarapayton.com/samijo/index.html

Sami Jo Cole website: http://www.samijocole.com/index.html

== Discography ==
- It Could Have Been Me (MGM South, S3G 703, 1974)
- Sami Jo (MGM South, M3G 4998, 1975)
