= Sweet Music Man =

1977 single by Kenny Rogers

Single by Kenny Rogers

from the album Daytime Friends
- B-side: "Lying Again"
- Released: October 10, 1977
- Genre: Country
- Length: 4:21
- Label: United Artists
- Songwriter: Kenny Rogers
- Producer: Larry Butler

Kenny Rogers singles chronology
| "Daytime Friends" (1977) | "Sweet Music Man" (1977) | "Every Time Two Fools Collide" (1978) |

"Sweet Music Man"

Single by Reba McEntire

from the album Greatest Hits Volume III: I'm a Survivor
- Released: January 2002
- Genre: Country
- Length: 3:27
- Label: MCA Nashville
- Songwriter: Kenny Rogers
- Producer: Alison Krauss

Reba McEntire singles chronology
| "I'm a Survivor" (2001) | "Sweet Music Man" (2002) | "I'm Gonna Take That Mountain" (2003) |

"Sweet Music Man" is a song written and recorded by American musician Kenny Rogers. It appears on his 1977 album Daytime Friends, from which it was released as the final single.

== History ==
In 1977, the song reached number 9 on the country music charts published by Billboard, and number 44 on the Billboard Hot 100. The song was a number one hit on the Canadian country and adult contemporary charts published by RPM, reaching its peak on both charts for the week of December 31, 1977. Rogers used the song as a b-side to two of his later singles: "Lady" in 1980 and "You Were a Good Friend" in 1983.

Later in 1977, Dolly Parton included the song on her Here You Come Again album (Parton and Alison Krauss performed the song together at the 2010 concert at Foxwoods Casino honoring Rogers' fifty years in entertainment); Reba McEntire covered the song in 2001 on her album Greatest Hits Volume III: I'm a Survivor. Her version was also released as a single, reaching number 36 on the country music charts. At the time, it was her lowest-peaking single since "(I Still Long to Hold You) Now and Then" in 1980.

Through the years the song has been covered by numerous other artists, including Tammy Wynette, Dottie West, Billie Jo Spears, Waylon Jennings, Anne Murray, Johnny Hallyday, and Millie Jackson.

== Critical reception ==
=== Kenny Rogers version ===
Kip Kirby, of Billboard magazine reviewed the song favorably, calling it a "first rate singing job from Rogers and pop-oriented production should ensure the chances of this song to register in both country and pop formats." She goes on to say that the song contains "excellent guitar work, cascading strings and Rogers' vocal ability to help the song build to a pleasing climax."

== Chart performance ==
=== Kenny Rogers ===
| Chart (1977–1978) | Peak position |
|---|---|
| Australian (Kent Music Report) | 89 |
| US Hot Country Songs (Billboard) | 9 |
| US Billboard Hot 100 | 44 |
| US Billboard Adult Contemporary | 29 |
| Canadian RPM Country Tracks | 1 |
| Canadian RPM Top Singles | 45 |
| Canadian RPM Adult Contemporary | 1 |

=== Millie Jackson ===
| Chart (1978) | Peak position |
|---|---|
| U.S. Billboard Hot R&B Singles | 33 |

=== Reba McEntire ===
| Chart (2002) | Peak position |
|---|---|
| US Hot Country Songs (Billboard) | 36 |
