= He Did with Me =

Single by Vicki Lawrence

from the album The Night the Lights Went Out in Georgia
- B-side: "Mr. Allison"
- Released: June 1973
- Genre: Easy Listening, Pop
- Length: 2:27
- Label: Bell
- Songwriters: Gloria Sklerov, Harry Lloyd
- Producer: Snuff Garrett

Vicki Lawrence singles chronology
| "The Night the Lights Went Out in Georgia" (1973) | "He Did with Me" (1973) | "Ships in the Night" (1973) |

"He Did with Me" is a song by Vicki Lawrence, an American pop music singer, actress, and comedienne. It was the second of two releases from her 1973 Bell Records debut album.

The song was a number-one hit on the Australian Kent Music Report. It appeared on the US Hot 100, but fell short of the main Top 40 in both countries, but reached the Top 20 on the Adult Contemporary charts of both nations. The song received strong airplay on Minneapolis radio station WDGY-AM.

== Chart performance ==
=== Weekly charts ===
| Chart (1973) | Peak position |
|---|---|
| Australia (Kent Music Report) | 1 |
| Canadian RPM Top Singles | 42 |
| Canadian RPM Adult Contemporary | 16 |
| US Billboard Hot 100 | 75 |
| US Adult Contemporary (Billboard) | 14 |
| US Cash Box Top 100 | 49 |

=== Year-end charts ===
| Chart (1973) | Rank |
|---|---|
| Australia | 18 |
| US (Joel Whitburn's Pop Annual) | 405 |
