= We're So Good Together =

Single by Reba

from the album So Good Together
- B-side: "Nobody Dies from a Broken Heart"
- Released: September 9, 2000
- Length: 3:31
- Label: MCA Nashville
- Songwriters: Bob DiPiero, John Scott Sherrill, Annie Roboff
- Producers: David Malloy, Reba McEntire

Reba singles chronology
"I'll Be" (2000)	"We're So Good Together" (2000)	"I'm a Survivor" (2001)

"We're So Good Together" is a song written by Bob DiPiero, John Scott Sherrill and Annie Roboff, and recorded by American country music artist Reba McEntire. It was released in September 2000 as the third single from the album So Good Together. The song reached #20 on the Billboard Hot Country Singles & Tracks chart.

== Chart performance ==
Chart (2000)	Peak position
Canada Country Singles (RPM)	27 (Note: "We're So Good Together" had not yet peaked when RPM ceased publication in November 2000.)
US Hot Country Songs (Billboard)	20
US Bubbling Under Hot 100 (Billboard)	9
