= What Do You Say (Reba McEntire song) =

Single by Reba McEntire

from the album So Good Together
- B-side: "Nobody Dies from a Broken Heart"
- Released: September 14, 1999
- Recorded: 1999
- Genre: Country pop
- Length: 3:28
- Label: MCA Nashville
- Songwriters: Michael Dulaney, Neil Thrasher
- Producers: David Malloy, Reba McEntire

Reba McEntire singles chronology
"One Honest Heart" (1999)	"What Do You Say" (1999)	"I'll Be" (2000)

"What Do You Say" is a song written by Neil Thrasher and Michael Dulaney, and recorded by American country music artist Reba McEntire. It was released on September 14, 1999 as the first single from her album So Good Together. The song reached number 3 on the Billboard Hot Country Singles & Tracks chart in January 2000 and number 31 on the Billboard Hot 100 becoming her first crossover hit and top 40 hit on the Billboard Hot 100. It is her highest peaking single on that chart.

A video was produced of the song, and has aired on CMT, CMT Pure Country and Great American Country.

== Content ==
The song's main premise explores a protagonist's struggle to appropriately explain or respond to different situations. The story — as depicted in the song's video, is told from the perspective of a typical American family.

The first verse sees the father and young son driving around town. While stopped at a red traffic light, the boy sees an adult bookstore and, spotting the store's marquee, asks "What are those X's for?" The father decides he does not want his son to know the type of business taking place inside the store and quickly changes the subject to football.

In the next verse, the teenaged daughter is at a friend's party, where she quickly becomes very drunk. After becoming ill, she becomes frightened and calls her mother to come get her. The mother does just that, upholding a promise to not ask any questions.

== Music video ==
In the video, directed by Deaton-Flanigen, the mother is suffering from the final stages of cancer; this is revealed when she removes her wig and sees that she has lost her hair due to chemotherapy. In the song's final verse, the woman's family is at her bedside saying their final goodbyes. Although she has been trying to maintain her strength, she knows that her life is about to end. Her final apparent words to her family are a whispered "I want to go home." As the video ends, a photo collage of the woman and her family in more pleasant times (presumably on display at the woman's visitation and funeral) is shown, before the three surviving members of the family — the father (played by Thomas Ian Griffith), daughter and son — leave the hospital in sadness. They walk by McEntire and two children, who are in the hallway for an unexplained reason; this is the only moment in the entire video in which McEntire appears. Furthermore, this video marks the third of such in McEntire's career to not feature her singing, the other two being 1992's "Is There Life Out There" and "The Night the Lights Went Out in Georgia." The video received a nomination for a Grammy Award for Best Short Form Music Video.

== Chart performance ==
Chart (1999–2000)	Peak position
Canada Country Singles (RPM)	5
US Billboard Hot 100	31
US Hot Country Songs (Billboard)	3

=== Year-end charts ===
Chart (2000)	Position
US Country Songs (Billboard)	38
