= 20th Century Masters – The Christmas Collection: The Best of Reba =

20th Century Masters: Christmas Collection

Greatest hits album by Reba McEntire
- Released: September 23, 2003
- Genre: Country
- Length: 40:31
- Label: MCA
- Producer: Jimmy Bowen; David Malloy; Reba McEntire

Reba McEntire chronology
Greatest Hits Volume III: I'm a Survivor (2001)	20th Century Masters: Christmas Collection (2003)	Room to Breathe (2003)

20th Century Masters – The Christmas Collection: The Best of Reba McEntire is a compilation of songs from Reba McEntire's two Christmas albums (Merry Christmas to You and The Secret of Giving: A Christmas Collection) for release in 2003 on a 20th Century Masters Christmas collection. No new material was recorded for the compilation.

== Track listing ==
No.	Title	Writer(s)	Length
1.	"This Is My Prayer for You"	Tony Arata, Gary Scruggs	3:40
2.	"I Saw Mommy Kissing Santa Claus"	Tommie Connor	3:44
3.	"Up on the Housetop"	Benjamin Hanby	2:07
4.	"The Angels Sang"	Helen Darling, Peggy Newman	3:45
5.	"The Secret of Giving"	Rick Bowles, Sunny Russ	3:55
6.	"Silent Night"	Franz Gruber, Josef Mohr	3:35
7.	"O Holy Night"	Adolphe Adam, John Sullivan Dwight	3:53
8.	"Happy Birthday Jesus (I'll Open This One for You)"	Traditional	2:33
9.	"White Christmas"	Irving Berlin	2:58
10.	"I'll Be Home for Christmas"	Kim Gannon, Walter Kent, Buck Ram	3:16
11.	"The Christmas Song"	Mel Tormé, Bob Wells	3:27
12.	"'Til The Season Comes 'Round Again"	Randy Goodrum, John Barlow Jarvis	3:34

== Critical reception ==
Professional ratings
Review scores
Source	Rating
Allmusic	3/5 stars

20th Century Masters – The Christmas Collection: The Best of Reba McEntire received three out of five stars from William Ruhlmann of Allmusic. In his review, Ruhlmann describes McEntire's versions of "Silent Night" and "Up on the Housetop" as "appropriately reverent," while "This Is My Prayer for You" is the "most memorable" of the non-standards.

== Chart performance ==
20th Century Masters – The Christmas Collection: The Best of Reba McEntire peaked at number 67 on the U.S. Billboard Top Country Albums chart.

Chart (2003)	Peak position
U.S. Billboard Top Country Albums	67
Chart (2015)	Peak position
Canadian Albums (Billboard)	79
