= I'm a Survivor =

Single by Reba McEntire

from the album Greatest Hits Volume III: I'm a Survivor
- B-side: "'Til I Said It to You"
- Released: July 5, 2001
- Recorded: 2001
- Genre: Country pop
- Length: 3:08
- Label: MCA Nashville
- Songwriters: Shelby Kennedy; Philip White
- Producers: Tony Brown; Reba McEntire

Reba McEntire singles chronology
"We're So Good Together" (2000)	"I'm a Survivor" (2001)	"Sweet Music Man" (2002)

"I'm a Survivor" is a song recorded by American country music singer Reba McEntire for her third compilation album Greatest Hits Volume III: I'm a Survivor (2001). The song was written by Shelby Kennedy and Philip White and produced by McEntire and Tony Brown. "I'm a Survivor" is a country pop song with lyrics that tell the story of a premature baby, who later becomes a single parent. It was released as the album's first single on July 5, 2001, through MCA Nashville. The song garnered a positive reception from contemporary music critics, who found McEntire fitting to perform the song. The track experienced moderate success in the United States, where it peaked at No. 49 on the Billboard Hot 100 as well as No. 3 on the Billboard' Hot Country Songs. An altered version of the song was later used as the theme song for McEntire's The WB/The CW sitcom Reba (2001–2007).

== Background and composition ==
"I'm a Survivor" was written by Shelby Kennedy and Philip White. It was produced by McEntire and record producer Tony Brown. The song features a variety of instrumentation, including electric guitars, played by Steve Gibson. The drums were played by Paul Leim, while the bass was performed by Michael Rhodes. The song's keyboards were provided by Steve Nathan and Matt Rollings. In addition to McEntire's vocals, background vocals were performed by Russell Terrell and Kim Parent. "I'm a Survivor" was recorded and mixed by recording engineer Justin Niebank at Emerald Studio A in Nashville, Tennessee. Niebank also recorded the overdub featured on the track with Steve Marcantonio at Ocean Way Nashville recording studio in Nashville Tennessee, assisted by Chad Brown and Leslie Richter.

"I'm a Survivor" is a country pop song with a length of 3 minutes and 8 seconds (3:08). According to the sheet music published at Musicnotes.com by BMG Rights Management, the song is composed in a key of D major and follows a chord progression of Em–D–D/F♯–G(9). It has a moderate tempo of 96 beats per minute. McEntire's vocals span from A3 to B4 while the piano arrangement ranges from A3 to G5. The song follows in the theme of McEntire previous singles, which center on struggles of strong women throughout their lives. The lyrics focus on a woman who was born prematurely and went on to become a single mother.

== Critical reception ==
The song received positive reviews from music critics who felt that McEntire made the song her own. Marshall Bowden of PopMatters stated the song "rings truer coming from her than it would from the likes of Hill and Twain" while adding that it "manages to combine the trials and tribulations of a premature baby and a single mom up in one ball of wax and still come out sounding like an anthem of personal victory—no small feat." About.com wrote positively about the song, "A perfect song for this troubled time in the world. Reba fits this song so perfectly. She *is* a survivor, and she's always done songs about strong women so well, and this is no exception."

In the United States, the song exhibited a moderate commercial performance. "I'm a Survivor" debuted on the Billboard Hot 100 at No. 81 on the issue dated September 15, 2001. The single continued ascending the chart for eleven weeks, reaching its peak at No. 49 on the issue dated December 1, 2001. It lasted a total of nineteen weeks on the chart. The song fared better on the Hot Country Songs chart, where it peaked at No. 3 on the issue dated November 24, 2001 and spent a total of 21 weeks on the chart.

== Credits and personnel ==
Credits adapted from the album's liner notes.

Locations

- Recorded at Emerald Studio A (Nashville, Tennessee)
- Overdubs recorded at Ocean Way Nashville (Nashville, Tennessee)
- Mastered at Master Mix (Nashville, Tennessee)

Personnel

- Reba McEntire – producer
- Tony Brown – producer
- Justin Niebank – recording (vocals and overdub), mixing
- Chad Brown – assistant recording (overdub)
- Leslie Richter – assistant recording (overdub)
- Steve Marcantonio – recording (overdub)
- Hank Williams – mastering

== Charts ==
Chart (2001)	Peak position
US Hot Country Songs (Billboard)	3
US Billboard Hot 100	49

=== Year-end charts ===
Chart (2001)	Position
US Country Songs (Billboard)	43

== Certifications ==
Region	Certification	Certified units/sales
United States (RIAA)	Gold	500,000^{‡}
^{‡} Sales+streaming figures based on certification alone.
