= So Good Together =

Studio album by Reba McEntire
- Released: November 23, 1999
- Studios: Starstruck Studios, Sound Emporium Studios, Emerald Entertainment Studios and The Sound Station (Nashville, Tennessee); Ocean Way Recording and Conway Studios (Hollywood, California); O'Henry Sound Studios (Burbank, California); Blue Studios (Rio de Janeiro, Brazil)
- Genres: Country; Country pop
- Length: 46:37
- Label: MCA
- Producers: Tony Brown; Guto Graça Mello; Reba McEntire; David Malloy; Keith Stegall

Reba McEntire chronology
If You See Him (1998)	So Good Together (1999)	Greatest Hits Volume III: I'm a Survivor (2001)

Singles from So Good Together
- 1. "What Do You Say" Released: September 14, 1999; 2. "I'll Be" Released: January 5, 2000; 3. "We're So Good Together" Released: September 9, 2000

Professional ratings
Review scores
Source	Rating
AllMusic	4/5 stars

So Good Together is the twenty-fourth studio album by American country music singer Reba McEntire. It was released in 1999 and was preceded by the single "What Do You Say". "What Do You Say" peaked at number 3 on the country singles chart and was nominated for a Grammy for Best Short Form Video. It also became her highest-charting single on the Billboard Hot 100, peaking at number 31. The album was certified platinum by the RIAA.

The album peaked at number 5 on the Billboard Top Country Albums chart and number 28 on the Billboard 200 with sales of 49,000 copies.

== Track listing ==
North American version

No.	Title	Writer(s)	Producer	Length
1.	"We're So Good Together"	Bob DiPiero, Annie Roboff, John Scott Sherrill	McEntire, David Malloy	3:31
2.	"'Til I Said It to You"	Tom Shapiro, Sharon Vaughn, Wally Wilson	McEntire, Tony Brown	3:21
3.	"I'll Be"	Diane Warren	McEntire, Brown	4:23
4.	"What Do You Say"	Michael Dulaney, Neil Thrasher	McEntire, Malloy	3:28
5.	"Roses"	Melba Montgomery, Leslie Satcher	McEntire, Brown	4:39
6.	"I'm Not Your Girl"	Shelly Peiken, Eric Silver	McEntire, Keith Stegall	3:39
7.	"She Wasn't Good Enough for Him"	Dean Dillon, Satcher	McEntire, Stegall	3:23
8.	"Nobody Dies from a Broken Heart"	Sonny LeMaire, Randy Sharp	McEntire, Malloy	3:58
9.	"Back Before the War"	Dan Hill, Keith Stegall, Robin Wiley	McEntire, Stegall	4:09
10.	"When You're Not Trying To"	Tim Johnson, Rory Feek	McEntire, Malloy	3:38
11.	"Where You End and I Begin"	Chuck Jones, Templeton Thompson	McEntire, Brown	4:17
12.	"We're All Alone" (with Jose y Durval and David Campbell)	Boz Scaggs	McEntire, Brown, Guto Graça Mello	4:11

International version

No.	Title	Writer(s)	Length
1.	"We're So Good Together"	DiPiero, Roboff, Sherrill	3:31
2.	"'Til I said It to You"	Shapiro, Vaughn, Wilson	3:21
3.	"I Like It That Way"	Robert Jason	3:15
4.	"What Do You Say"	Dulaney, Thrasher	3:28
5.	"Roses"	Montgomery, Satcher	4:39
6.	"I'm Not Your Girl"	Peiken, Silver	3:39
7.	"She Wasn't Good Enough for Him"	Dillon, Satcher	3:23
8.	"Nobody Dies from a Broken Heart"	LeMaire, Sharp	3:58
9.	"Back Before the War"	Hill, Stegall, Wiley	4:09
10.	"When You're Not Trying To"	Johnson, Feek	3:38
11.	"Where You End and I Begin"	Jones, Thompson	4:17
12.	"We're All Alone" (with Jose e Durval)	Scaggs	4:11
13.	"I'll Be"	Warren	4:23
14.	"If I Fell"	Paul McCartney, John Lennon	2:59

== Personnel ==
Adapted from liner notes.

- Reba McEntire – vocals, backing vocals (1, 4, 8, 10)
- Jimmy Nichols – keyboards (1, 4, 8, 10), backing vocals (1, 4, 8, 10)
- John Hobbs – synthesizer (2, 3, 5, 11), keyboards (12)
- John Barlow Jarvis – keyboards (2, 3, 5, 11), acoustic piano (2, 3, 5, 11, 12)
- Steve Nathan – keyboards (2, 3, 5, 11), acoustic piano (2, 3, 5, 11)
- Gary Prim – keyboards (6, 7, 9), acoustic piano (6, 7, 9)
- Jeff King – electric guitar (1, 4, 8, 10)
- B. James Lowry – acoustic guitar (1, 4, 8, 10)
- Brent Mason – electric guitar (1, 4, 6–10)
- Jerry McPherson – electric guitar (1, 4, 8, 10)
- Brent Rowan – electric guitar (1, 4, 8, 10)
- Mark Casstevens – acoustic guitar (2, 3, 5, 11, 12)
- Steve Gibson – acoustic guitar (2, 3, 5, 11), electric guitar (2, 3, 5, 11)
- Dann Huff – electric guitar (2, 3, 5, 11)
- Steuart Smith – acoustic guitar (2, 3, 5, 11), electric guitar (2, 3, 5, 11, 12), gut string guitar (12)
- John Willis – acoustic guitar (6, 7, 9)
- Terry Crisp – steel guitar (1, 4, 8, 10)
- Paul Franklin – steel guitar (1–11)
- Richard "Spady" Brannon – bass (1, 4, 8, 10)
- Michael Rhodes – bass (2, 3, 5, 11, 12)
- Glenn Worf – bass (2, 3, 5–7, 9, 11)
- Paul Leim – drums (1–5, 8, 10, 11)
- Eddie Bayers – drums (2, 3, 5–7, 9, 11, 12)
- Eric Darken – percussion (1, 4, 8, 10)
- Larry Franklin – fiddle (1–5, 8, 10, 11)
- Stuart Duncan – fiddle (6, 7, 9)
- The Nashville String Machine – strings (2, 3, 5, 11)
- Ronn Huff – string arrangements and conductor (2, 3, 5, 11)
- Steve Dorff – string arrangements and conductor (6, 7, 9)
- Debbi Datz-Pyle – orchestra contractor (6, 7, 9)
- Patti Zimmitti – orchestra contractor (6, 7, 9)
- David Campbell – orchestra arrangements and conductor (12)
- Wes Hightower – backing vocals (1, 4, 8, 10)
- Liana Manis – backing vocals (1, 4, 6–10)
- John Cowan – backing vocals (2, 3, 5, 11)
- Thom Flora – backing vocals (2, 3, 5, 11)
- Kim Keyes – backing vocals (2, 3, 5, 11)
- John Wesley Ryles – backing vocals (2, 3, 5–7, 9, 11)
- Harry Stinson – backing vocals (2, 3, 5, 11)
- Templeton Thompson – backing vocals (2, 3, 5, 11)
- Laura Vida – backing vocals (2, 3, 5, 11)
- Jose y Durval – featured vocals (12)

== Production ==
- Reba McEntire – producer, liner notes
- David Malloy – producer (1, 4, 8, 10)
- Tony Brown – producer (2, 3, 5, 11, 12)
- Keith Stegall – producer (6, 7, 9)
- Guto Graça Mello – producer (12)
- Candle Burgess – production coordinator (1, 4, 8, 10)
- Jessie Noble – production coordinator (2, 3, 5, 11, 12)
- Sandra Fox – production coordinator (6, 7, 9)
- Cindy Owen – art direction
- Karen Cronin – design
- Ron Davis – photography
- Lynn Rogers – make-up
- Sandi Spika – hair, wardrobe
- Narvel Blackstock for Starstruck Entertainment – representation

Technical credits

- Denny Purcell – mastering at Georgetown Masters (Nashville, Tennessee)
- Kevin Beamish – mixing (1, 4, 8, 10), recording (1, 10)
- Steve Marcantonio – recording (2, 4, 5, 8, 11), mixing (2, 5, 11), overdub recording (3), additional overdub recording (12)
- Jeff Balding – recording (3, 12), mixing (3, 12), string recording (3), guitar overdub recording (3)
- Graham Lewis – overdub recording (3)
- John Kelton – recording (6, 7, 9), mixing (6, 7, 9)
- Mark Nevers – overdub recording (6, 7, 9), recording assistant (6, 7, 9)
- Rick Riccio – string recording (6, 7, 9)
- Daniel Kresco – mix assistant (1, 4, 8, 10), additional recording assistant (1, 4, 8, 10)
- Derek Bason – additional recording (1, 4, 8, 10), recording assistant (1, 10), digital editing (1, 4, 8, 10)
- J.R. Rodriguez – additional recording assistant (1, 4, 8, 10), recording assistant (2, 3, 5, 11), mix assistant (2, 5, 11)
- Brian McConkey – recording assistant (2, 5, 11, 12), mix assistant (2, 5, 11, 12)
- Alex Chan – recording assistant (3, 4, 8, 12), mix assistant (12)
- Matt Andrews – string recording assistant (3)
- Eric Bickel – guitar overdub assistant (3)
- Chad Brown – mix assistant (3)
- Brady Burnett – mix assistant (6, 7, 9), additional engineer (6, 7, 9)
- Jon Stople – additional engineer (6, 7, 9)
- Victor Carrio – string recording assistant (6, 7, 9)
- Jeff Shannon – string recording assistant (6, 7, 9)
- Ben Faccone – additional overdub recording (12)

== Charts ==
=== Weekly charts ===
Chart (1999)	Peak position
Australian Albums (ARIA)	124
Canadian Country Albums (RPM)	9
US Billboard 200	28
US Top Country Albums (Billboard)	5

=== Year-end charts ===
Chart (2000)	Position
US Billboard 200	129
US Top Country Albums (Billboard)	12
Chart (2001)	Position
US Top Country Albums (Billboard)	65

=== Certifications ===
Region	Certification	Certified units/sales
United States (RIAA)	Platinum	1,000,000^{^}
^{^} Shipments figures based on certification alone.

=== Singles ===
Year	Single	Peak chart positions		
Year	Single	US Country	US	CAN Country
1999	"What Do You Say"	3	31	5
2000	"I'll Be"	4	51	4
2000	"We're So Good Together"	20	109	—

=== Other charted songs ===
Year	Single	Peak chart positions
Year	Single	US Country
1999	"I'm Not Your Girl"	75
1999	"Till I Said It to You"	70
