= Vicki! =

American television talk show

- Presented by: Vicki Lawrence
- Country of origin: United States

Production
- Camera setup: Multi-camera setup
- Running time: 60 minutes
- Production companies: Lawrence-Schultz Productions; Group W Productions

Original release
- Network: Syndication (1992–1994)
- Release: 1992 – 1994

Vicki! is a syndicated talk show hosted by actress and The Carol Burnett Show alumna Vicki Lawrence from 1992 to 1994. The show earned a number of Daytime Emmy Award nominations, including Outstanding Talk Show Host, though it was short-lived and ended after its second season due to creative conflicts behind the scenes between Lawrence and the show's distributor, Group W (whose stations formed the main group carrying the series).

== Background ==
After the end of Mama's Family and hosting the daytime network version of Win, Lose or Draw for NBC, Vicki Lawrence was put together with Group W to do a talk show in the vein of its long-running shows with Merv Griffin and Mike Douglas, as Lawrence had no interest in hosting a tabloid talk show.

== Cancellation ==
The show was renewed after the first season, with Lawrence gaining more creative control of the series through the summer hiatus. The show ended after the second season as it became clear the mid-afternoon Griffin/Douglas model with celebrity guests was outmoded, along with tension behind the scenes to move towards the tabloid format becoming more popular and Group W (which was about to go through a deal to acquire CBS and switch their stations to their network) decided to recruit actress Marilu Henner to host a show of her own as a replacement in the tabloid format, which only lasted one season.
