= The Night the Lights Went Out in Georgia =

1972 ballad by Bobby Russell

Single by Vicki Lawrence

from the album The Night the Lights Went Out in Georgia
- B-side: "Dime a Dance"
- Released: 7 November 1972
- Recorded: October 24–26, 1972
- Genre: Southern gothic; country pop
- Length: 3:40
- Label: Bell
- Songwriter: Bobby Russell
- Producer: Snuff Garrett

Vicki Lawrence singles chronology
"No, No" (1970)	"The Night the Lights Went Out in Georgia" (1972)	"He Did with Me" (1973)

"The Night the Lights Went Out in Georgia" is a Southern Gothic murder ballad first recorded by actress, singer, comedian Vicki Lawrence. The song was written in 1972 by songwriter Bobby Russell, who was married to Lawrence at the time. Lawrence's version, from her 1973 album of the same name, went to number one on the US Billboard Hot 100. There have been several cover versions since Lawrence's release. Reba McEntire's version, from her 1991 album For My Broken Heart, peaked at number 12 on the US Hot Country Songs chart.

== Content ==
The unnamed female narrator tells about how her unnamed brother, identified only as "Brother", was executed for a crime he did not actually commit, although he had intended to do it.

Returning home from a two-week trip, Brother stops for a drink at a bar before going home to his wife. While there, he encounters his friend Andy Wolloe, who tells Brother that his wife has been having an affair with "that Amos boy, Seth", then admits that he has "been with her [him]self". An angry Brother leaves the bar, and a frightened Andy makes his way home. Assuming his absent wife has left town, Brother retrieves a gun and walks through the woods to Andy's house. On the way, he notices a set of footprints "too small for Andy to make" leading to and from Andy's house. Arriving at Andy's back door, Brother sees his body, killed by a gunshot. In a panic, Brother fires a shot in the air to get the attention of the Georgia Patrol, but the sheriff who arrives accuses him of the murder. In a show trial, the judge wastes little time declaring Brother guilty and sentences him to death, which is carried out in short order.

The story wraps up as the narrator explains that the footprints in the woods were hers, traveling to and from Andy's house to shoot him. She then reveals that she not only killed Andy but Brother's wife as well, boasting that "that's one body that'll never be found" and "little sister don't miss when she aims her gun." In the song's chorus, the singer blames the local criminal justice system for Brother's death, warning the listener, "Don't trust your soul to no backwoods Southern lawyer, 'cause the judge in the town's got blood stains on his hands."

== History and original recording ==
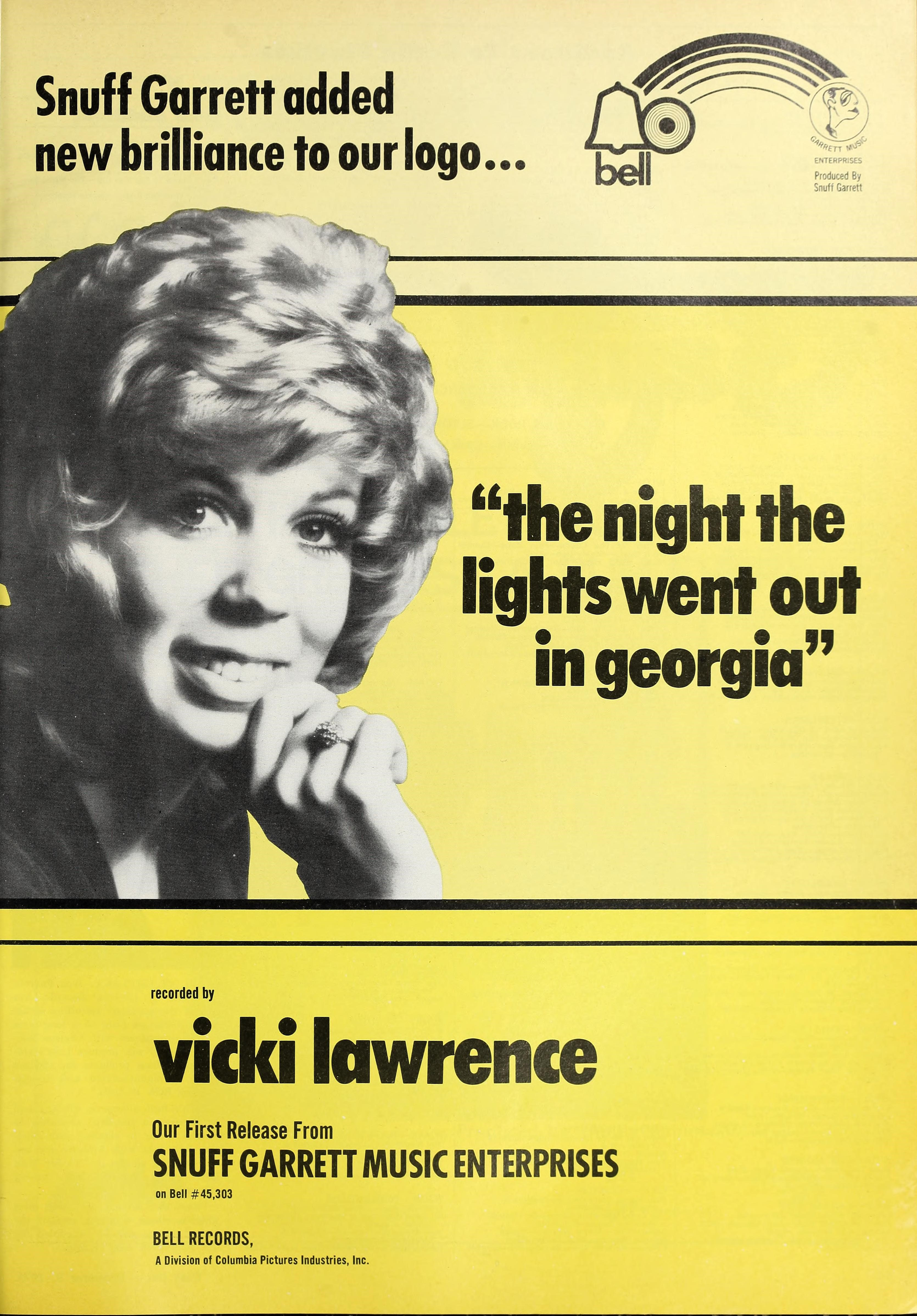
Cashbox advertisement, December 9, 1972

Although Bobby Russell wrote the lyrics and composed the music for the song, he was reluctant to even record a demo for it because he did not like it. Lawrence, who was married to Russell at the time, believed the song was a hit and recorded the demo. The publishers and the record label did not know how to pitch the song, as it was not a country or a pop song. The first thought was to offer the song to actress/singer Liza Minnelli, but eventually it was offered to singer Cher. Cher's then-husband and -manager, Sonny Bono, refused it as he was concerned that the song might offend Cher's Southern fans. Without a singer to record the song, Lawrence, along with producer Snuff Garrett, went into a studio and recorded it professionally herself, with the instrumental backing of session musicians from the Wrecking Crew.

== Release and reception ==
Released as a single in November 1972, the song went to No. 1 on the Hot 100 chart in 1973 when Lawrence was a regular performer on the ensemble variety comedy television show The Carol Burnett Show. On March 24, 1973, the final episode of the sixth season, Burnett surprised Lawrence by presenting her with an RIAA gold record for more than a million copies sold. The song hit No. 6 on the Easy Listening chart, and peaked at No. 36 on Billboard's Hot Country Singles chart. It was No. 1 for two weeks on the Billboard Hot 100, and was topped by Tony Orlando and Dawn's "Tie a Yellow Ribbon Round the Ole Oak Tree." Billboard ranked it as the No. 11 song for 1973.

In Canada, the single version went to No. 1 on the RPM 100 national singles chart on May 5, 1973. On the RPM Country Singles chart, it reached No. 25.

== Musical structure ==
The lyrics use an AABCCB rhyming pattern on the verses, and ABAB on the chorus. The song's verses are in C Dorian. Verse one consists of four lines, each using the chord pattern Cm-B♭/C-Cm-F/C-Cm-Gm7-Cm. At the chorus, the song modulates to the key of G major, with a chord pattern of Am-D7-G-Em used three times before ending on Am-D7-Gm.

Verse two uses the same structure as verse one, with an additional two lines. The first additional line also modulates to G major with a chord pattern of Am-D7-G-Em-Am-D-Gm, before returning to C Dorian for another repetition of the original chord pattern. After the second chorus, the third verse consists of two lines before the chorus is sung a third time. The song ends with a four-measure riff in G minor. The vocal range is G_{3}-D_{5}.

== Personnel ==
- Vocals by Vicki Lawrence
- Music played by the Wrecking Crew

== Cover versions ==
"The Night the Lights Went Out in Georgia"

Single by Reba McEntire

from the album For My Broken Heart
- B-side: "All Dressed Up"
- Released: April 1992
- Recorded: 1991
- Genre: Country
- Length: 4:17
- Label: MCA Nashville
- Songwriter: Bobby Russell
- Producers: Tony Brown, Reba McEntire

Reba McEntire singles chronology
"Is There Life Out There" (1992)	"The Night the Lights Went Out in Georgia" (1992)	"The Greatest Man I Never Knew" (1992)

=== Tanya Tucker ===
In 1981, country singer Tanya Tucker recorded a version with differing lyrics and an altered timeline, based on the plot of the 1981 film The Night the Lights Went Out in Georgia. Tucker's cover is included on the film's soundtrack album.

=== Reba McEntire ===
During 1991, the song was covered by Reba McEntire on her album For My Broken Heart. It reached No. 12 on Billboard's Hot Country Songs chart. While still a commercially successful release, it broke a string of 24 consecutive top 10 country singles by McEntire.

Jack Cole directed a music video for the McEntire single, which included spoken dialogue expanding on the song's plot points. In the video, the older brother of the story is given the name Raymond Brody, and it's suggested that the judge convicted Brody despite knowing Brody was innocent, because he (the judge) feared a trial would expose that he had also had an affair with the wife, played by Playboy centerfold/pin up model Barbara Moore. In the video, the little sister, played by McEntire, as a young woman in flashbacks and in the present as a woman in her 70s, catches her fiancé, Andy, in the act with her brother's wife.

During a promotional tour for the song, Lawrence and McEntire performed the song as a duet on Lawrence's talk show Vicki! using the McEntire backing track.

== In popular culture ==
- The song inspired a 1981 film of the same name, which features a different storyline but uses several names from the song.
- The 1992 film Reservoir Dogs references the song's twist ending when Nice Guy Eddie, played by Chris Penn, says, "This is the first time I ever realized that the girl singin' the song is the one who shot Andy."
- The song is referenced in a parody on The Carol Burnett Show, on which Lawrence was a cast member (season 7 episode 25). A non-existent song, "The Night My Tights Gave Out in Georgia", is mentioned during a sketch set against the backdrop of a music awards show.
- Using Pete Schofield and the Canadians' recording, the opening and closing motifs are sampled in "The Time Is Now," which American professional wrestler John Cena used as his entrance music.
- The title of the song is part of a monologue featured on the sitcom Designing Women in the episode called "The Beauty Contest" (season 1, episode 2), spoken by the character Julia Sugarbaker, as played by Dixie Carter. The monologue became notable and was subsequently quoted by fans and is often mentioned in pop culture.

== Charts ==
=== Vicki Lawrence version ===
==== Weekly charts ====
Chart (1972–1973)	Peak position
Australia (Kent Music Report)	20
Canada Top Singles (RPM)	1
Canada Adult Contemporary (RPM)	2
Canada Country Tracks (RPM)	25
New Zealand (Listener)	18
US Billboard Hot 100	1
US Adult Contemporary (Billboard)	6
US Hot Country Songs (Billboard)	36

==== Year-end charts ====
Chart (1973)	Rank
Canada (RPM)	10
US Billboard Hot 100	11

=== Reba McEntire version ===
==== Weekly charts ====
Chart (1992)	Peak position
Canada Country Singles (RPM)	7
US Hot Country Songs (Billboard)	12

==== Year-end charts ====
Chart (1992)	Position
Canada Country Tracks (RPM)	73

== Certifications ==
=== Vicki Lawrence version ===
Region	Certification	Certified units/sales
United States (RIAA)	Gold	1,000,000^{^}
^{^} Shipments figures based on certification alone.

=== Reba McEntire version ===
Region	Certification	Certified units/sales
United States (RIAA)	2× Platinum	2,000,000^{‡}
^{‡} Sales+streaming figures based on certification alone.

== See also ==
- Murder ballad
- List of 1970s one-hit wonders in the United States
