= I'll Be (Reba McEntire song) =

- Australia cover art

Single by Reba McEntire

from the album So Good Together
- B-side: "When You're Not Trying"
- Released: March 13, 2000
- Genre: Country
- Length: 4:23
- Label: MCA Nashville
- Songwriter: Diane Warren
- Producers: Reba McEntire; Tony Brown

Reba McEntire singles chronology
| "What Do You Say" (1999) | "I'll Be" (2000) | "We're So Good Together" (2000) |

"I'll Be" is a song by American country music recording artist Reba McEntire. The song was written by famed songwriter Diane Warren, with McEntire co-producing the track with frequent collaborator Tony Brown. Released as the second single from her 24th studio album So Good Together (1999), the track was sent to country radio on March 13, 2000.

The song continued McEntire's chart success, hitting number four on both the US Hot Country Songs chart and Canada RPM Country Tracks while also becoming her second entry in Australia.

== Music video ==
Deaton-Flanigen Productions filmed the music video for "I'll Be". It is one of McEntire's few music videos not available on her official YouTube channel. It debuted to CMT on March 12, 2000. The video would be nominated for Video of the Year at the 2001 TNN Country Weekly Music Awards, the precursor to the modern-day CMT Music Awards.

== Commercial performance ==
"I'll Be" initially entered the US Billboard Hot Country Songs chart the week of February 12, 2000 due to unsolicited airplay at number 69. It re-entered the chart the week of March 25, 2000 at number 52, unofficially being the highest debut of the week (the highest first-time debut of that week was Lee Ann Womack and Sons of the Desert's "I Hope You Dance" at number 56). It would hit its peak position of number four on the chart on July 22, 2000, becoming her 51st top-ten single. On both country charts for Radio & Records and Gavin Report, the track hit number three.

== Charts ==
=== Weekly charts ===
| Chart (2000) | Peak position |
|---|---|
| Australia (ARIA) | 198 |
| Canada Country Singles (RPM) | 4 |
| US Billboard Hot 100 | 51 |
| US Hot Country Songs (Billboard) | 4 |
| US Radio Songs (Billboard) | 42 |
| US Country Top 50 (Radio & Records) | 3 |
| US GavinCountry (Gavin Report) | 3 |

=== Year-end charts ===
| Chart (2000) | Position |
|---|---|
| US Country Songs (Billboard) | 28 |
| US Country (Radio & Records) | 26 |
