= Vicki Lawrence =

American actress, comedian, and singer (born 1949)

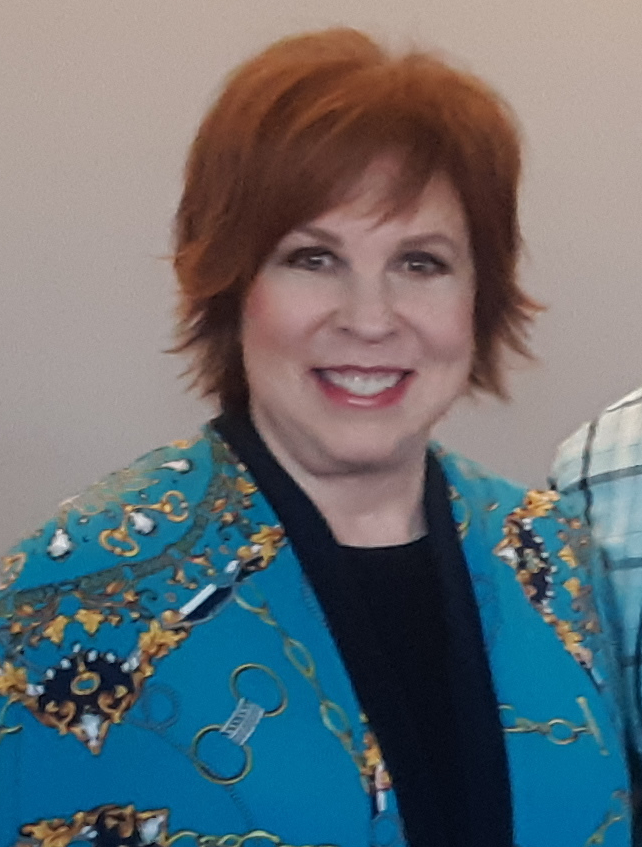
- Lawrence in 2024
- Born: Vicki Ann Axelrad; March 26, 1949 (age 77); Inglewood, California, U.S.
- Other name: Vicki Lawrence Schultz
- Occupations: Actress; comedian; singer
- Years active: 1967–present
- Spouses: Bobby Russell (m. 1972; div. 1974) Al Schultz (m. 1974; died 2024)
- Children: 2
- Website: Official website

Vicki Lawrence (born Vicki Ann Axelrad; March 26, 1949), sometimes credited as Vicki Lawrence Schultz, is an American actress, comedian, and singer. She played the title character Mama (Thelma Harper) in the NBC sitcom Mama's Family. The Mama character originated from one of the characters Lawrence played on CBS's The Carol Burnett Show from 1967 to 1978, and was one of many she created for the variety show.

Continuing the Mama character's evolution, Lawrence has hosted an untelevised stand-up comedy routine since 2001, "Vicki and Mama: A Two Woman Show". Moreover, Lawrence has made numerous post-Mama's Family guest TV show appearances in her famed Mama role.

In 1973, Lawrence became a one-hit wonder singer, landing on the US chart with "The Night the Lights Went Out in Georgia". The song reached number one on both the United States and Canada charts. "The Night the Lights Went Out in Georgia" peaked at no. 36 on the US country chart. In 1991 Reba McEntire covered the song for her album For My Broken Heart.

In early 1974, Lawrence hit number one in Australia with "He Did with Me", followed up by the no. 7, "Ships in the Night". She also released an album on Bell Records. Lawrence has multiple Emmy Award nominations, and won one in 1976. She was also nominated for Golden Globe awards multiple times for her work on The Carol Burnett Show. Lawrence made several guest appearances in the Disney Channel sitcom Hannah Montana and starred in the Fox sitcom series The Cool Kids.

== Early life ==
Lawrence was born Vicki Ann Axelrad in Inglewood, California.

Her paternal grandfather, Simon Axelrad, was an Austrian Jewish immigrant. Her paternal grandmother, Anna Irmas, was born in Illinois, to German Jewish parents but became an adherent of Christian Science, in which faith Vicki's father was raised. The family surname was legally changed to "Lawrence" when Vicki was young.

A graduate of Morningside High School in Inglewood (class of 1967), Lawrence had originally planned on being a dental hygienist. She attended UCLA while on The Carol Burnett Show, and changed her major to theater arts, but dropped out after two years.

In high school, she joined the musical group The Young Americans. She stayed with the group until almost the end of high school. While with the group, she gained experience from touring, performing at the Oscars, coming in contact with noteworthy performers such as Johnny Mathis and Louis Armstrong, and performing on The Andy Williams Show.

In her senior year, she entered the Miss Fireball of Inglewood contest for the local firefighter's ball. A reporter for a local newspaper wrote a story about the contest and mentioned that Lawrence bore a striking resemblance to a young Carol Burnett. An avid fan letter-writer, Lawrence's mother urged her to write a letter to Burnett and include the newspaper article. After receiving the letter, Burnett found Lawrence's father's name in the phone book, called him, and pledged to see the Miss Fireball contest. Lawrence won the contest and Burnett was called to the stage to crown her. Burnett had been looking for an actress to play her younger sister on her upcoming show, and after a few months and several auditions by Lawrence, she offered Lawrence, now 18, the opportunity to play "Chrissy" in the "Carol and Sis" sketches.

After Lawrence was given the job on The Carol Burnett Show, both Burnett and Harvey Korman took her under their wings. Korman taught her various sketch comedy skills, such as listening not just for a cue line, and also coached her in other areas, such as speaking in different accents. Lawrence has credited Korman and Burnett with being her mentors, and has referred to her experience on the show as the "Harvard school of comedy". Lawrence has stated that she learned show business from Burnett and looked up to her very much, and that the two share a very close friendship.

== Career ==
=== Acting ===
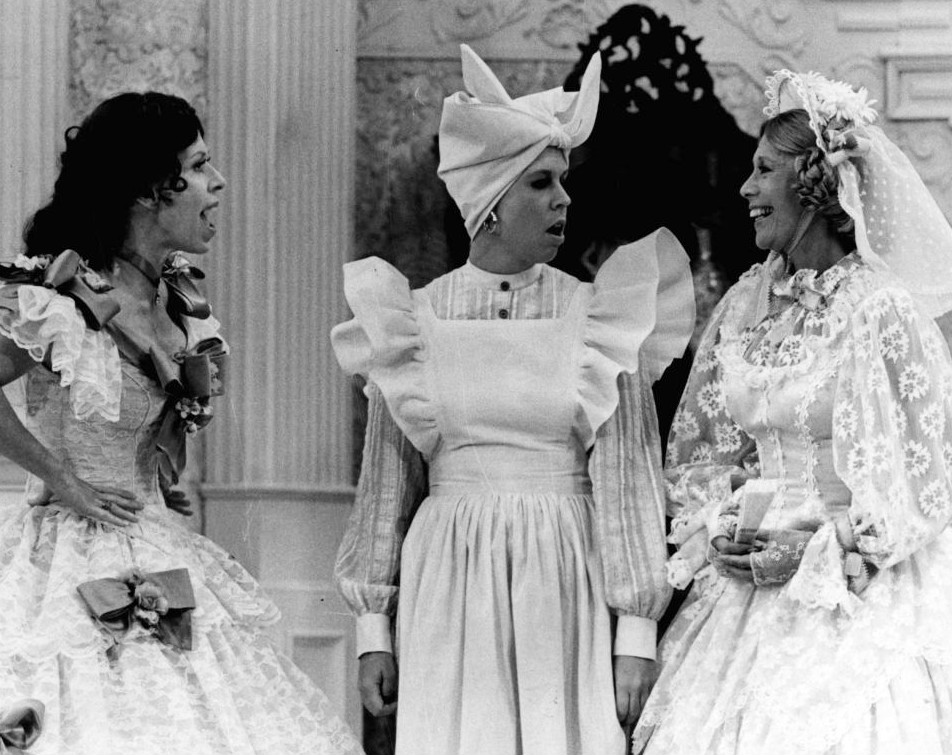
On The Carol Burnett Show, L-R: Carol Burnett, Vicki Lawrence, and Dinah Shore in the sketch "Went with the Wind!", 1977.

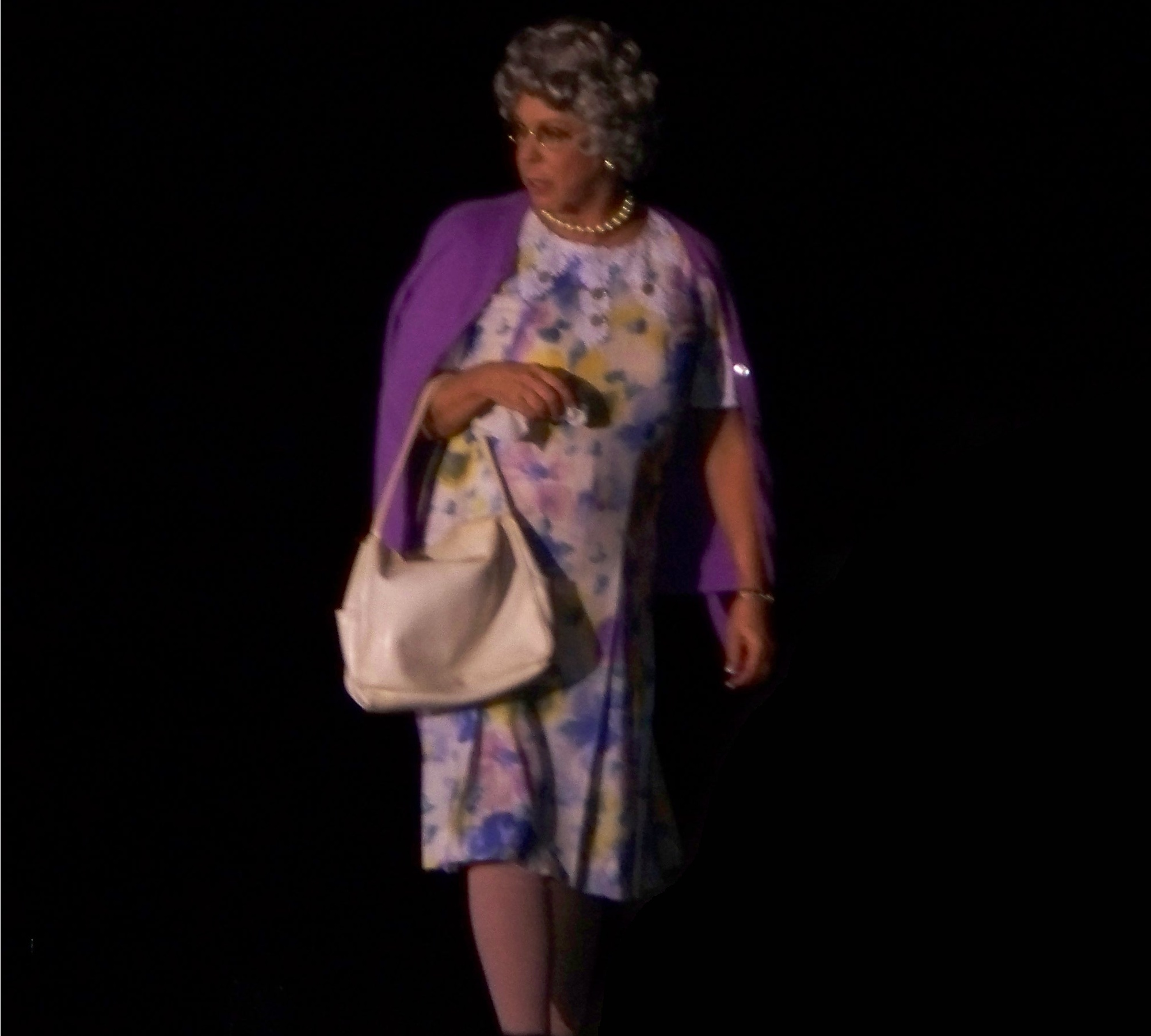
Vicki Lawrence as Thelma "Mama" Harper, 2009

As a comedian and actress, Lawrence is best known for her work on CBS's The Carol Burnett Show, of which she was a part from 1967 to 1978. She was the only cast member, except for Burnett herself, who stayed on the show for the entire 11 seasons. After The Carol Burnett Show ended in 1978, Lawrence and her husband Al Schultz moved with their children to Maui, Hawaii, but after a few years, returned to Los Angeles, where they have remained.

==== Mama character and Mama's Family ====
In The Carol Burnett Show's seventh season, Lawrence debuted her Mama role on a comedy sketch called The Family. Originally created as a one-off skit, The Family enjoyed unexpected success with audiences, which led to its recurring appearances for the final five seasons of the program. With Lawrence's portraying the character of an elderly mother to Eunice, The Family bred some of The Carol Burnett Show's most famed blooper moments.

Lawrence's portrayal of the Mama character on The Carol Burnett Show's The Family sketches was so popular that CBS developed the TV movie Eunice in 1982, and NBC subsequently developed the sitcom Mama's Family; Burnett reprised the Eunice Higgins character for the sitcom from time to time. The series ran from 1983 to 1985 on NBC. After its cancellation from NBC, it was renewed from 1986 to 1990 in first-run syndication, where it was more successful than in its earlier incarnation. Lawrence also reprised the Mama character on stage for Vicki Lawrence & Mama: A Two-Woman Show.

==== Other acting ====
Lawrence has made appearances on other programs, such as the sitcoms Laverne & Shirley, The Love Boat, Major Dad, Diagnosis: Murder, and Yes, Dear. She appeared in two episodes of Murder, She Wrote, playing different characters. Lawrence also played Dan's old high-school flame, Phyllis, in an episode of Roseanne.

Between the NBC and syndication runs of Mama's Family, Lawrence starred in the 1985 comedy pilot Anything for Love, which aired as a special on CBS that summer and co-starred Lauren Tewes and Rebeca Arthur. Lawrence has also appeared with Burnett, Korman, and Tim Conway in the Burnett show retrospectives that were broadcast in 1993, 2001, and 2004. Lawrence played Sister Mary Paul (Sister Amnesia) in the TV special based on Nunsense Jamboree that originally aired on TNN in 1998. She is also known for her voice-over work as Flo on the animated series Hermie and Friends.

Lawrence played Mamaw Stewart (the mother of Robby Ray Stewart and grandmother of Jackson and Miley Stewart) in the hit Disney series Hannah Montana alongside Billy Ray Cyrus and his daughter Miley Cyrus from 2006 to 2011. In 2011, she was Mrs. Santa Claus in the Hallmark movie Annie Claus Is Coming to Town. She starred in the Fox sitcom The Cool Kids, along with Martin Mull, Leslie Jordan, and David Alan Grier from 2018 to 2019.

Lawrence played as Mama in an Ohio commercial, promoting a constitutional amendment that would permit casino gambling in Ohio. She also appeared in a special celebrity-edition episode of the Anne Robinson version of The Weakest Link. Playing for a charity, she made it to the final two but ended up losing to Ed Begley Jr.

=== Music ===
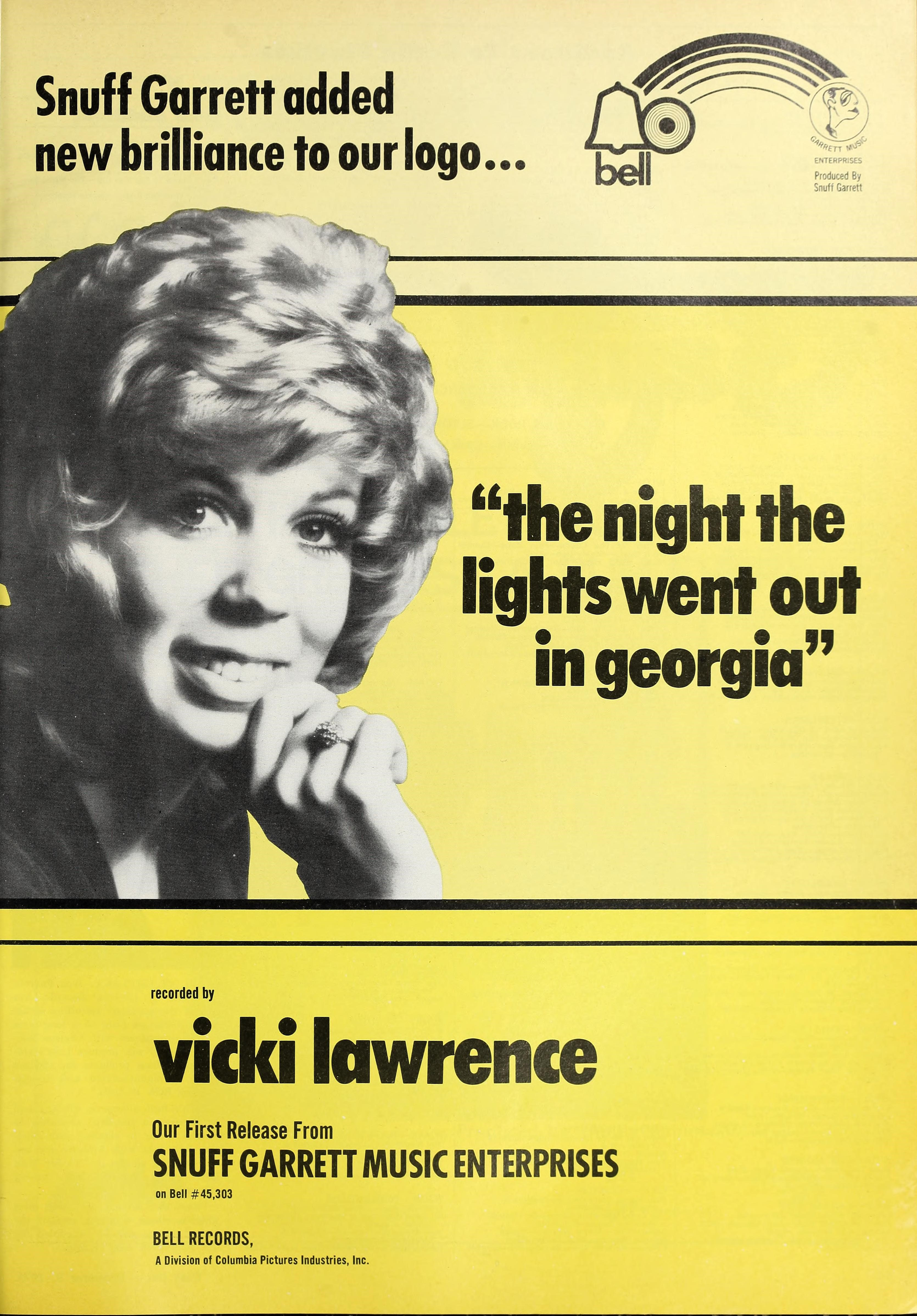
Cashbox advertisement, December 9, 1972

As a singer, Lawrence got her start as one of the scores of hopefuls on the syndicated Johnny Mann's Stand Up And Cheer program. However, she is most known for her number-one hit, "The Night the Lights Went Out in Georgia", a song written by her first husband Bobby Russell, which was released on Bell Records in November 1972. It sold over two million copies and was awarded a gold disc by the Recording Industry Association of America during the last episode of the sixth season of The Carol Burnett Show (March 24, 1973), when Burnett herself surprised Lawrence with the award on the air. Her first LP, The Night the Lights Went Out in Georgia, was issued soon after the single went gold. The song was re-recorded by Reba McEntire for her 1991 album For My Broken Heart. McEntire released the track as a single to country radio in 1992 and it peaked at No. 12 on the country chart, aided in part by a highly cinematic music video.

"He Did with Me", Lawrence's follow-up to "The Night the Lights Went Out in Georgia", reached number 75 in the United States, although it reached the top 20 of the adult contemporary music charts and also became her biggest hit in Australia, peaking at number one there in November 1973. She followed it up there with "Ships in the Night" (1974). In the fall of 1975, Lawrence managed one last minor U.S. chart entry on the Private Stock label with "The Other Woman" (number 81).

In 1974, she recorded her second LP for Bell Records, Ships in the Night. The label was in the process of being phased out by Arista, and the LP was not released in the U.S. The LP was, however, released in Australia, where she continued to have chart success. Lawrence's first two LPs were released as a single CD with bonus tracks on April 1, 2014, by Real Gone Music.

She released a disco album entitled Newborn Woman in late 1979. The album produced the minor disco hit "Don't Stop the Music".

=== Hosting and other work ===
As an emcee, Lawrence hosted the daytime NBC version of the game show Win, Lose or Draw (1987-1990), as well as an unsold pilot for Mark Goodson Productions, 1990's Body Talk. She has also appeared often as a popular celebrity player on such game shows as Match Game, Password, Password Plus, Super Password, and various incarnations of the Pyramid game show, where she was known for verbally sparring with host Dick Clark on numerous occasions. In one episode, aired in 1987, she also left after losing only to return during the closing credits. She also appeared on the 1986–89 version of Hollywood Squares, where she appeared both as herself and in character as Thelma "Mama" Harper. She was a regular panelist on the 1998 revival of Match Game, but the series only lasted one season.

As a talk show host, Lawrence was nominated a number of times for a Daytime Emmy Award for Outstanding Talk Show Host for the eponymous Vicki! (1992–1994), but the show ended after two seasons amid creative battles with her syndicator. In 1997, she hosted Fox After Breakfast, which was renamed The Vicki Lawrence Show, but was cancelled five weeks later due to low ratings.

In 2018, Lawrence was seen promoting The Carol Burnett Show and other classic television series on the MeTV television network.

She currently tours the country with her "two-woman" show with the first half as herself and the second half done as Mama. She can also be seen on TV in an infomercial for the Big Boss Grill.

== Personal life ==
Lawrence was married to singer and songwriter Bobby Russell from 1972 to 1974. Lawrence's second husband was Hollywood make-up artist Al Schultz, whom she married November 16, 1974, and with whom she had two children, Courtney Allison Schultz (born May 3, 1975) and Garrett Lawrence Schultz (born July 1, 1977). Al Schultz died June 19, 2024.

Lawrence was a registered Republican for most of her life, and a strong supporter of Elizabeth Dole. In 2000, she changed her affiliation to the Democratic Party and endorsed Al Gore. Since then, she has remained active in a variety of liberal leaning causes including women's rights, animal welfare and the environment.

Lawrence and her family appeared on Celebrity Family Feud in July 2015.

Lawrence was diagnosed with chronic idiopathic urticaria (CIU) around 2011. She teamed with the Asthma and Allergy Foundation of America and has become the spokesperson for the campaign "CIU & You".

She appeared on The Doctors in 2015 to relay her story and talk about CIU and promote the CIU & You campaign.

== Filmography ==
Selected film and television roles
Year	Title	Role	Notes
1967–1978	The Carol Burnett Show	Various characters	Regular cast member Won – Primetime Emmy Award for Individual Performance in a Variety or Music Program – 1976; Nominated – Primetime Emmy award for Best Supporting Actress in Comedy-Variety, Variety or Music (1967); Nominated – Primetime Emmy Award for Individual Performance in a Variety or Music Program (1975, 1977); Nominated – Golden Globe Award for Best Supporting Actress – Series, Miniseries or Television Film (1973, 1975, 1977)
1975–1991	The (New) $25,000 Pyramid	Herself (celebrity contestant)	90 episodes
1976–1991	The $25,000 Pyramid	Herself (celebrity contestant)	7 episodes
1978	The Eddie Capra Mysteries	Eve Randall	Episode: "Murder on the Flip Side"
1978–1986	The Love Boat	Various roles	6 episodes
1979	Carol Burnett & Company	Various characters	4 episodes
1979–1983	Laverne & Shirley	Sgt. Alvinia T. Plout	5 episodes
1979–1981	Password Plus	Herself (celebrity contestant)	49 episodes
1982	Eunice	Thelma Harper	TV movie Nominated – Primetime Emmy Award for Outstanding Supporting Actress in a Miniseries or a Movie (1980–81)
1983–1990	Mama's Family	Thelma Harper	130 episodes
1987	Mama's Family	Lydia Harper	1 episode
1984–1988	Super Password	Herself (celebrity contestant)	44 episodes
1985	Anything for Love	Elaine Monty	Unsold TV pilot
1985–1986	Murder, She Wrote	Phoebe Carroll / Jackie MacKay	2 episodes: "My Johnny Lies Over the Ocean" and "Trial by Error"
1987–1989	Win, Lose, or Draw	Host	Nominated – Daytime Emmy Award for Outstanding Game Show Host (1988, 1989)
1991	Major Dad	"Pookie" Pond	Episode: "Steel Magnolia"
1992–1994	Vicki!	Host	Nominated – Daytime Emmy Award for Outstanding Talk Show Host (1993, 1994, 1995)
1993	Roseanne	Phyllis Zimmer	Episode: "Guilt by Imagination"
1994	Hart to Hart: Old Friends Never Die	Nora Kingsley	TV movie
1996	Diagnosis: Murder	Kitty Lynn	Episode: "FMurder"
1997	Fox After Breakfast: The Vicki Lawrence Show	Host	
2001–2005	Yes, Dear	Natalie Warner	7 episodes
2002–2004	Hollywood Squares	Herself/Thelma Harper (celebrity panelist)	45 episodes
2006–2011	Hannah Montana	Ruthie "Mamaw" Stewart	5 episodes
2012	RuPaul's Drag Race All Stars	Herself/Thelma Harper	1 episode
2015	Celebrity Family Feud	Herself	1 episode
2017	Great News	Angie Deltaliano	4 episodes
2018–2019	The Cool Kids	Margaret Flynn	22 episodes
2022	The Resident	Gloria Ortiz	Episode: "The Space Between"
2023	Call Me Kat	Lurlene Crumpler	Episode: "Call Me Philliam"
2023	The Really Loud House	Joan Shivers	Episode: "The Manager with the Planager"
2023	Carol Burnett: 90 Years of Laughter + Love	Herself	TV special
2024	Monsters: The Lyle and Erik Menendez Story	Leigh	Episode: "Hang Men"
2024	Lopez vs Lopez	Ruthie Van Bryan	Episode: "Lopez vs In-Laws"
2025	Palm Royale	Lotte	4 episodes

== Discography ==
=== Albums ===
Year	Album	Chart positions			Catalog #
Year	Album	US	AUS	CAN	Catalog #
1973	The Night the Lights Went Out in Georgia	51	—	—	Bell 1120; Stateside SOSL-10105
1974	Ships in the Night	—	94	—	Stateside SOSL-10106
1979	Newborn Woman	—	—	—	Windmill LJ-26

=== Singles ===
Year	Song	Chart positions								Album
Year	Song	US	US AC	US Country	CAN	CAN AC	CAN Country	AUS	NZ	Album
1969	"And I'll Go" b/w "The Whole State of Alabama"	—	—	—	—	—	—	—	—	Non-album tracks
1970	"No, No" b/w "Lincoln Street Chapel"	—	—	—	—	—	—	—	—	Non-album tracks
1973	"The Night the Lights Went Out in Georgia" b/w "Dime a Dance"	1	6	36	1	2	25	20	18	The Night the Lights Went Out in Georgia
1973	"He Did with Me" b/w "Mr. Allison"	75	14	—	42	16	—	1	—	The Night the Lights Went Out in Georgia
1974	"Ships in the Night" b/w "Sensual Man" (from The Night the Lights Went Out in Georgia)	—	49	—	—	—	—	7	18	Ships in the Night
1974	"Mama's Gonna Make It All Better" b/w "Cameo"	—	—	—	—	—	—	56	18	Ships in the Night
1974	"Old Home Movies" b/w "The Light on the Back Porch Door" (from Ships in the Night); UK release only	—	—	—	—	—	—	—	—	Non-album tracks
1975	"The Other Woman" b/w "Cameo"	81	—	—	97	—	—	97	—	Non-album tracks
1976	"There's a Gun Still Smokin' in Nashville" b/w "Mama's Gonna Make It All Better"	—	—	—	—	—	—	—	—	Non-album tracks
1976	"Love in the Hot Afternoon" b/w "The Other Man I've Been Slipping Around With"	—	—	—	—	—	—	—	—	Non-album tracks
1977	"Hollywood Seven" (mono) b/w "Hollywood Seven" (stereo)	—	—	—	—	—	—	—	—	Non-album tracks
1979	"Don't Stop the Music" b/w "Newborn Woman"	—	—	—	—	—	—	—	—	Newborn Woman
1979	"Your Lies" b/w "Star Love"	—	—	—	—	—	—	—	—	Newborn Woman
"—" denotes releases that did not chart.

== Written works ==
- Vicki!: The True-Life Adventures of Miss Fireball (1995) – ISBN 0-684-80286-4; published by Simon & Schuster with Marc Eliot, an American biographer listed several times on The New York Times bestsellers list.
- Mama for President: Good Lord, Why Not? (2008) ISBN 1-4016-0409-9 ISBN 978-1-4016-0409-7, with Monty Aidem, an American comedy writer.

== See also ==
- List of 1970s one-hit wonders in the United States
