= Bobby Russell =

American singer-songwriter (1940–1992)

Background information
- Born: April 19, 1940; Nashville, Tennessee, U.S
- Died: November 19, 1992 (aged 52) Nicholasville, Kentucky, U.S.
- Genres: Country, pop
- Occupation: Singer-songwriter
- Instrument: Vocals
- Years active: 1966–1973
- Labels: Elf, United Artists
- Spouse: Vicki Lawrence (m. 1972; div. 1974)

Bobby Russell (April 19, 1940 – November 19, 1992) was an American singer and songwriter. Between 1966 and 1973, he had five singles on the Hot Country Songs charts, including the crossover pop hit "Saturday Morning Confusion". Russell was married to singer and actress Vicki Lawrence from 1972 to 1974.

== Career ==
Russell wrote hits over several genres. His most notable songs were "The Night the Lights Went Out in Georgia", his critique of country justice (a No. 1 hit for his then-wife Vicki Lawrence), "Used to Be" (sung by Lawrence) and "As Far As I'm Concerned" (sung by Russell) both from the 1970 film The Grasshopper; and "Little Green Apples", which won a Song of the Year Grammy Award in 1968. "Little Green Apples" was originally recorded and released by Roger Miller, who had the first Top 40 hit with the song. It was also a hit for O.C. Smith and Patti Page in the US in 1968. The song was a particular favorite of Frank Sinatra. Russell wrote the song "Honey", which was a hit for Bobby Goldsboro in 1968, spending five weeks at the top of the Billboard Hot 100 chart.

Russell wrote the ballad "Do You Know Who I Am", which was recorded by Elvis Presley during his 1969 Memphis sessions. Russell penned "The Joker Went Wild", a Billboard Top 40 hit for Brian Hyland in 1966. Russell also wrote "Anabell of Mobile" for Nancy Sinatra. The Russell composition "Camp Werthahekahwee", an ode to summer camps sung by a father to his son, appeared on a 1986 album by Ray Stevens. The name of the camp is pronounced "where the heck are we?"

=== As a performer ===
As a singer, Russell's biggest chart success was his self-penned "Saturday Morning Confusion", a top 25 country hit and No. 28 pop hit in the early fall of 1971. The song was a first-person account of a family man suffering from a hangover and trying to find peace and quiet to sleep it off, but constantly being henpecked by the kids, wife and neighbors. Also penned and sung by Russell was 1974's "Go Chase Your Rainbow", his highest-charting entry in Australia.

Other songs that Russell recorded were "Better Homes and Gardens", "1432 Franklin Pike Circle Hero", "For a While We Helped Each Other Out", "Our Love Will Rise Again", "How You Gonna Stand It", and "Mid American Manufacturing Tycoon". He also wrote and recorded "Summer Sweet" for the Disney live-action Rascal in 1969 and wrote and sang the title song "As Far as I'm Concerned" over the opening credits of The Grasshopper.

== Death ==
Russell was married to Cynthia Jo Horton Russell, at the time of his death from coronary artery disease, on November 19, 1992 in Nicholasville, Kentucky. He was 52 years old.

== Discography ==
=== Albums ===
Year	Album	Chart Positions		Label
Year	Album	US Country	US	Label
1968	Words, Music, Laughter and Tears	—	—	Elf
1969	Bobby Russell Unlimited	—	—	Elf
1971	Saturday Morning Confusion	44	183	United Artists

=== Singles ===
Year	Single	Chart Positions							Album
Year	Single	US Country	US BB	US AC	AUS	CAN	CAN Country	CAN AC	Album
1966	"Friends and Mirrors"	—	—	—	—	22	—	—	Non-LP tracks
1967	"Dusty"	—	—	—	—	—	—	—	Words, Music, Laughter and Tears
1968	"1432 Franklin Pike Circle Hero"	64	36	9	—	35	—	—	Words, Music, Laughter and Tears
1969	"Carlie"	66	115	—	—	—	—	—	Non-LP tracks
1969	"Then She's a Lover"	—	—	—	—	—	—	—	Bobby Russell Unlimited
1969	"Better Homes and Gardens"	34	—	31	—	—	—	—	Bobby Russell Unlimited
1969	"Our Love Will Rise Again"	—	—	—	64	—	—	—	Bobby Russell Unlimited
1971	"Saturday Morning Confusion"	24	28	13	52	27	13	14	Saturday Morning Confusion
1971	"Goodbye"	—	—	—	—	—	—	—	Saturday Morning Confusion
1972	"Easy Made For Lovin'"	—	—	—	—	—	—	—	Non-LP tracks
1973	"Mid American Manufacturing Tycoon"	93	—	—	82	—	—	—	Non-LP tracks
1974	"I Wouldn't Have It Any Other Way"	—	—	—	—	—	—	—	Non-LP tracks
1974	"Go Chase Your Rainbow"	—	—	—	25	—	—	—	Non-LP tracks
1975	"Little Boxes"	—	—	—	—	—	—	—	Non-LP tracks
