= Reba Live =

Live album by Reba McEntire
- Released: August 30, 1989
- Recorded: April 2–4, 1989, Palm Desert, CA
- Genre: Country
- Length: 74:08
- Label: MCA
- Producer: Jimmy Bowen; Reba McEntire

Reba McEntire chronology
Sweet Sixteen (1989)	Reba Live (1989)	Rumor Has It (1990)

Professional ratings
Review scores
Source	Rating
AllMusic	3/5 stars
The Windsor Star	A

Reba Live is a live album by American country singer Reba McEntire released on August 30, 1989. It is Reba's only live album to date. It features material primarily from her MCA recordings, including several covers ("Respect", "Jolene", "Mama Tried", "Night Life" and "Sweet Dreams"). The album had no singles. It won the Favorite Country Album award at the American Music Awards.

== Track listing ==
No.	Title	Writer(s)	Length
1.	"So, So, So Long"	Lisa Palas, Alan Taylor	4:23
2.	"One Promise Too Late"	Dave Loggins, Don Schlitz, Lisa Silver	3:16
3.	"Let the Music Lift You Up"	Troy Seals, Eddie Setser	3:40
4.	"Little Rock"	Bob DiPiero, Gerry House, Pat McManus	3:08
5.	"New Fool at an Old Game"	Steve Bogard, Rick Giles, Sheila Stephen	3:44
6.	"Little Girl"	Kendal Franceschi, Quentin Powers	3:29
7.	"Can't Stop Now"	Gary Nicholson, Wendy Waldman	2:23
8.	"Sunday Kind of Love"	Barbara Belle, Anita Leonard, Louis Prima, Stan Rhodes	5:43
9.	"I Know How He Feels"	Rick Bowles, Will Robinson	3:16
10.	"Whoever's in New England"	Franceschi, Powers	3:13
11.	"Cathy's Clown"	Don Everly	3:06
12.	"You Must Really Love Me"	Reba McEntire, Schlitz	3:09
13.	"Somebody Up There Likes Me"	Bill Cooley, Suzy Wills	3:04
14.	"San Antonio Rose"	Bob Wills	1:01
15.	"Mama Tried"	Merle Haggard	1:06
16.	"Night Life"	Walt Breeland, Paul Buskirk, Willie Nelson	4:20
17.	"Jolene"	Dolly Parton	2:51
18.	"Sweet Dreams"	Don Gibson	4:00
19.	"Respect"	Otis Redding	3:07

== Personnel ==
- Reba McEntire – lead vocals
- Kirk Cappello – keyboards, backing vocals
- Michael Thomas – electric guitars
- Glen Duncan – acoustic guitar, fiddle, mandolin, backing vocals
- Joe McGlohon – acoustic guitar, saxophone
- ? – banjo on "Jolene"
- Steve Marshall – bass guitar
- Vic Mastrianni – drums
- Suzy Wills – backing vocals

=== Production ===
- Jimmy Bowen – producer
- Reba McEntire – producer
- Kirk Cappello – assistant producer
- Bill "Dog" Dooley – recording engineer
- Gary Long – recording engineer
- Tim McColm – recording engineer
- Brently Walton – recording engineer
- Bob Bullock – overdub recording, mixing, digital editing
- Dave Boyer – assistant engineer
- Mark J. Coddington – assistant engineer
- Julian King – assistant engineer
- Russ Martin – assistant engineer
- Marty Williams – assistant engineer
- Milan Bogdan – digital editing
- Glenn Meadows – mastering
- Mark Eshelman – project coordinator
- Jessie Noble – project coordinator
- Mickey Braithwaite – art direction, design
- Beth Gwinn – photography

== Charts ==
=== Weekly charts ===
Chart (1989)	Peak position
US Billboard 200	124
US Top Country Albums (Billboard)	2

=== Year-end charts ===
Chart (1990)	Position
US Top Country Albums (Billboard)	10
Chart (1991)	Position
US Top Country Albums (Billboard)	55
Chart (1992)	Position
US Top Country Albums (Billboard)	68

== Certifications and sales ==
Region	Certification	Certified units/sales
United States (RIAA)	Platinum	1,000,000^{^}
^{^} Shipments figures based on certification alone.
