= List of number-one singles in 1960 (New Zealand) =

This is a list of Number 1 hit singles in 1960 in New Zealand, starting with the first chart dated, 21 July 1960 from the Lever Hit Parade.

== Summary ==
=== Chart ===
Week	Title	Artist
21 July 1960	"Cathy's Clown"	Bill & Boyd ^{‡}
28 July 1960	"Cathy's Clown"	Bill & Boyd ^{‡}
4 August 1960	"Everybody's Somebody's Fool"	Connie Francis
11 August 1960	"Everybody's Somebody's Fool"	Connie Francis
18 August 1960	"Alley Oop"	The Hollywood Argyles
25 August 1960	"Alley Oop"	The Hollywood Argyles
1 September 1960	"I'm Sorry"	Brenda Lee
8 September 1960	"Alley Oop"	Dante & Evergreens
15 September 1960	"Itsy Bitsy Teenie Weenie Yellow Polka Dot Bikini"	Brian Hyland
22 September 1960	"Please Don't Tease"	Cliff Richard
29 September 1960	"Please Don't Tease"	Cliff Richard
27 October 1960	"Apache"	The Shadows
3 November 1960	"Apache"	The Shadows
10 November 1960	"It's Now Or Never"	Elvis Presley
17 November 1960	"Lively"	Lonnie Donegan
24 November 1960	"It's Now or Never"	Elvis Presley
December not archived
