= List of costliest tropical cyclones =

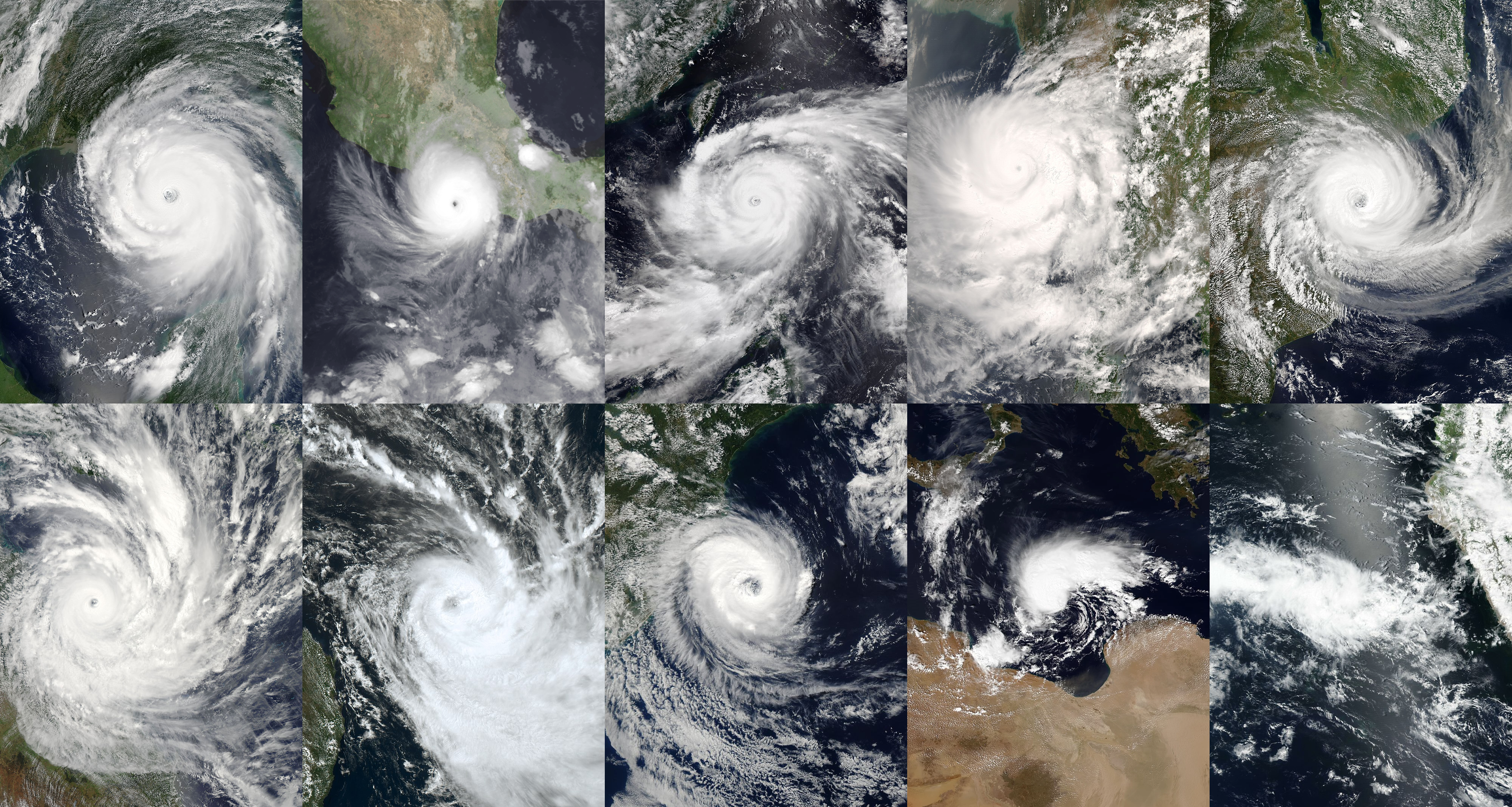
The costliest tropical cyclones by basin when adjusted for inflation.

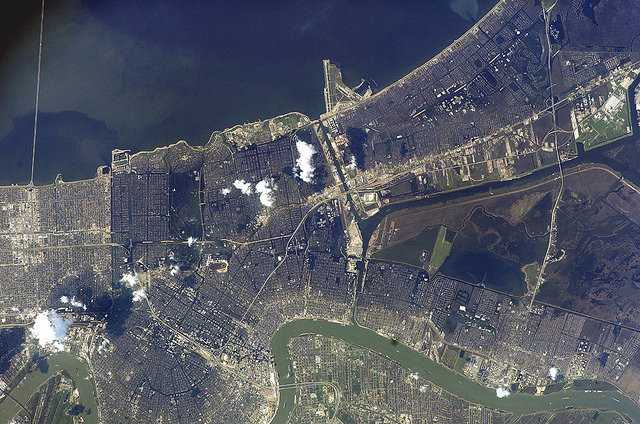
NASA flood image after Hurricane Katrina.

This is a list of costliest tropical cyclones, listed by tropical cyclone basin. Damage tolls of tropical cyclones are listed and ranked in USD of the year of the tropical cyclone, although inflation-adjusted figures are also supplied. The main effects of tropical cyclones include strong winds, heavy rainfall, storm surge, floods, tornadoes, and landslides. This list is based on property damage done directly by a tropical cyclone.

== Overall costliest ==
The costliest tropical cyclones on record are Hurricanes Katrina and Harvey, both causing $125 billion in damages in 2005 and 2017, respectively. In 2022, Hurricane Ian became the third-costliest tropical cyclone on record, causing $112 billion in damages. In 2017, Hurricane Maria became the fourth costliest tropical cyclone on record. In 2024, Hurricane Helene became the fifth-most costly tropical cyclone on record, causing $78.7 billion in damages. Hurricanes Irma and Ida also have damage tolls of over $70 billion.

Costliest Tropical Cyclones
Rank (Nominal)	Storm Name	Season	Basin	Damage (Nominal USD)	Inflation-Adjusted Damage (2025 USD)
1	5 Katrina	2005	N. Atlantic	$125 billion	$206 billion
1	4 Harvey	2017	N. Atlantic	$125 billion	$164 billion
3	5 Ian	2022	N. Atlantic	$112 billion	$123 billion
4	5 Maria	2017	N. Atlantic	$91.6 billion	$120 billion
5	4 Helene	2024	N. Atlantic	$78.7 billion	$80.8 billion
6	5 Irma	2017	N. Atlantic	$77.2 billion	$101 billion
7	4 Ida	2021	N. Atlantic	$75.3 billion	$89.4 billion
8	3 Sandy	2012	N. Atlantic	$68.7 billion	$96.3 billion
9	4 Ike	2008	N. Atlantic	$38 billion	$56.8 billion
10	5 Milton	2024	N. Atlantic	$34.3 billion	$35.2 billion
11	4 Doksuri	2023	W. Pacific	$28.6 billion	$30.2 billion
12	5 Andrew	1992	N. Atlantic	$27.3 billion	$62.6 billion
13	5 Wilma	2005	N. Atlantic	$26.5 billion	$43.7 billion
14	5 Ivan	2004	N. Atlantic	$26.1 billion	$44.5 billion
15	5 Michael	2018	N. Atlantic	$25.5 billion	$32.7 billion
16	4 Florence	2018	N. Atlantic	$24.2 billion	$31 billion
17	4 Laura	2020	N. Atlantic	$23.3 billion	$29 billion
18	TS Daniel	2023	Mediterranean	$21.1 billion	$22.3 billion
19	TS Senyar	2025	N. Indian	$19.8 billion	$20.1 billion
20	5 Rita	2005	N. Atlantic	$18.5 billion	$30.5 billion
21	5 Hagibis	2019	W. Pacific	$17.3 billion	$21.8 billion
22	4 Charley	2004	N. Atlantic	$16.9 billion	$28.8 billion
23	5 Matthew	2016	N. Atlantic	$16.5 billion	$22.1 billion
24	5 Amphan	2020	N. Indian	$15.5 billion	$19.3 billion
25	4 Nargis	2008	N. Indian	$15.3 billion	$22.9 billion
26	5 Yagi	2024	W. Pacific	$14.7 billion	$15.1 billion
27	3 Irene	2011	N. Atlantic	$14.2 billion	$20.3 billion
28	5 Jebi	2018	W. Pacific	$13 billion	$16.7 billion
29	5 Melissa	2025	N. Atlantic	$12.2 billion	$12.2 billion
30	5 Otis	2023	E. Pacific	$12 billion	$12.7 billion
31	5 Hugo	1989	N. Atlantic	$11 billion	$28.6 billion
32	2 Fitow	2013	W. Pacific	$10.4 billion	$14.4 billion
33	4 Frances	2004	N. Atlantic	$10.1 billion	$17.2 billion
33	4 Mireille	1991	W. Pacific	$10 billion	$23.6 billion
35	4 Faxai	2019	W. Pacific	$10 billion	$12.6 billion
36	4 Georges	1998	N. Atlantic	$9.37 billion	$18.5 billion
37	4 Songda	2004	W. Pacific	$9.3 billion	$15.9 billion
38	4 Lekima	2019	W. Pacific	$9.28 billion	$11.7 billion
39	5 Saomai	2000	W. Pacific	$9.24 billion	$17.3 billion
40	2 Gabrielle	2022–23	S. Pacific	$9.2 billion	$10.1 billion
41	5 Beryl	2024	N. Atlantic	$9.05 billion	$9.29 billion
42	TS Allison	2001	N. Atlantic	$9 billion	$16.4 billion
43	4 Gustav	2008	N. Atlantic	$8.31 billion	$12.4 billion
44	5 Fani	2019	N. Indian	$8.1 billion	$10.2 billion
45	5 Rammasun	2014	W. Pacific	$8.08 billion	$11 billion
46	3 Jeanne	2004	N. Atlantic	$7.94 billion	$13.5 billion
47	2 Sally	2020	N. Atlantic	$7.3 billion	$9.08 billion
48	4 Eta	2020	N. Atlantic	$7.24 billion	$9.01 billion
49	4 Floyd	1999	N. Atlantic	$6.5 billion	$12.6 billion
50	3 Hato	2017	W. Pacific	$6.41 billion	$8.42 billion

== North Atlantic Ocean ==
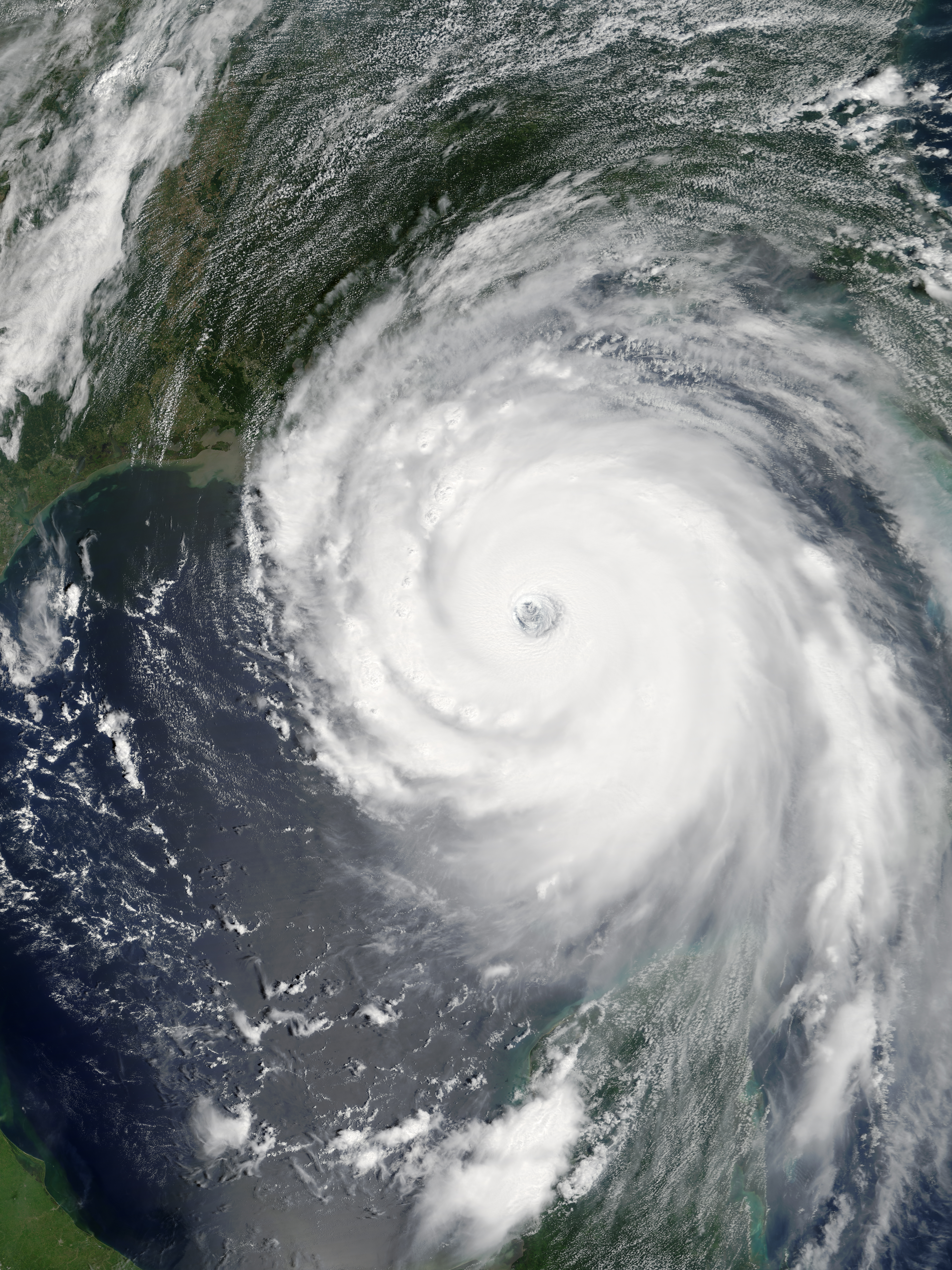
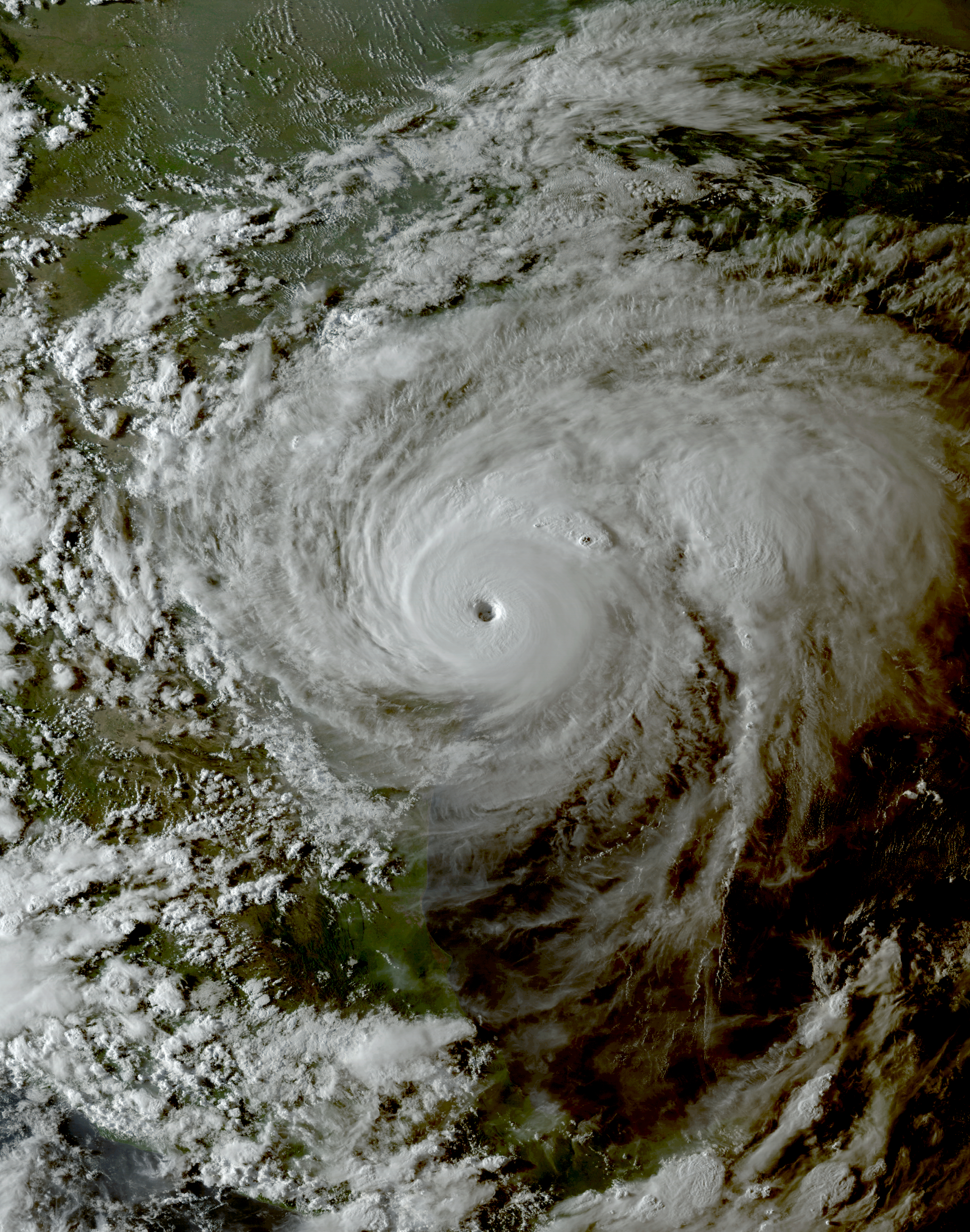
Hurricanes Katrina (left) and Harvey (right) both caused $125 billion in damage, more than any other tropical cyclone worldwide.

The costliest Atlantic hurricanes on record are Hurricanes Katrina and Harvey, both causing $125 billion in damages in 2005 and 2017 respectively. In 2022, Hurricane Ian became the third costliest Atlantic hurricane on record, causing $112 billion in damages. Hurricanes Maria, Helene, Irma, and Ida also have damage tolls of over $70 billion. The costliest tropical cyclone in the Atlantic that did not become a hurricane is Tropical Storm Allison, which caused $9 billion in damages in 2001. The costliest Atlantic hurricane to not have its name retired is Hurricane Sally in 2020, which caused $7.3 billion in damages.

Costliest Atlantic hurricanes
Rank (Nominal)	Hurricane	Season	Damage (Nominal USD)	Inflation-Adjusted Damage (2025 USD)
1	5 Katrina	2005	$125 billion	$206 billion
1	4 Harvey	2017	$125 billion	$164 billion
3	5 Ian	2022	$112 billion	$123 billion
4	5 Maria	2017	$91.6 billion	$120 billion
5	4 Helene	2024	$78.7 billion	$80.8 billion
6	5 Irma	2017	$77.2 billion	$101 billion
7	4 Ida	2021	$75.3 billion	$89.4 billion
8	3 Sandy	2012	$68.7 billion	$96.3 billion
9	4 Ike	2008	$38 billion	$56.8 billion
10	5 Milton	2024	$34.3 billion	$35.2 billion

== Northeastern Pacific Ocean ==
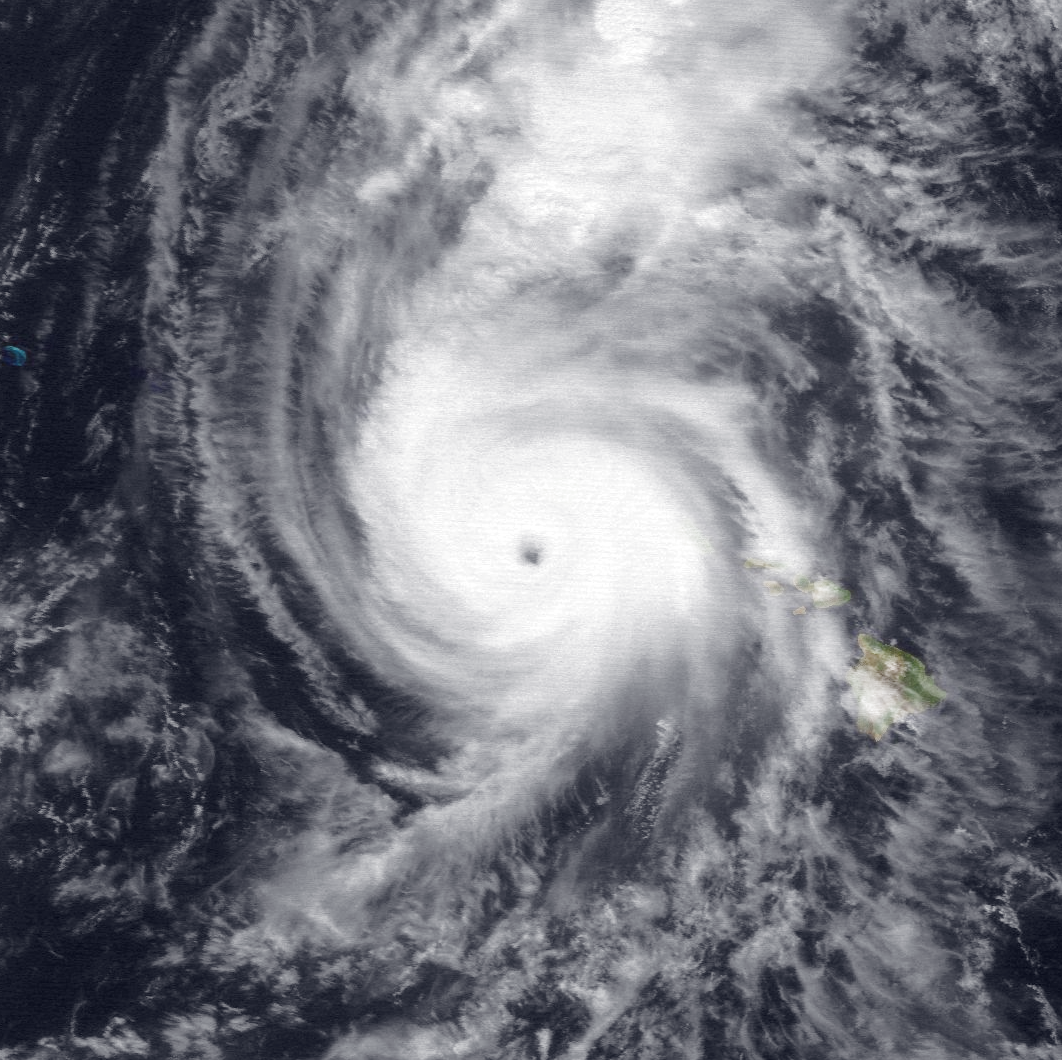
Hurricane Iniki at peak intensity near landfall in Kauai

The costliest Pacific hurricane on record was Hurricane Otis in 2023. Hurricane Manuel in 2013 is the second costliest Pacific hurricane on record. Hurricane Iniki of the 1992 Pacific hurricane season is still the costliest central Pacific hurricane on record. Only six Pacific hurricanes have caused over one billion dollars in damage; the three mentioned above, as well as Hurricane John, Hurricane Odile and Tropical Storm Agatha.

Costliest Pacific hurricanes
Rank (Nominal)	Hurricane	Season	Damage (Nominal USD)	Inflation-Adjusted Damage (2025 USD)
1	5 Otis	2023	$12–16 billion	$16.9 billion
2	1 Manuel	2013	$4.2 billion	$5.81 billion
3	4 Iniki	1992	$3.1 billion	$7.11 billion
4	3 John	2024	$2.45 billion	$2.51 billion
5	4 Odile	2014	$1.25 billion	$1.7 billion
6	TS Agatha	2010	$1.1 billion	$1.62 billion
7	4 Hilary	2023	$948 million	$1 billion
8	5 Willa	2018	$825 million	$1.06 billion
9	1 Madeline	1998	$750 million	$1.48 billion
10	2 Rosa	1994	$700 million	$1.52 billion

== Northwestern Pacific Ocean ==
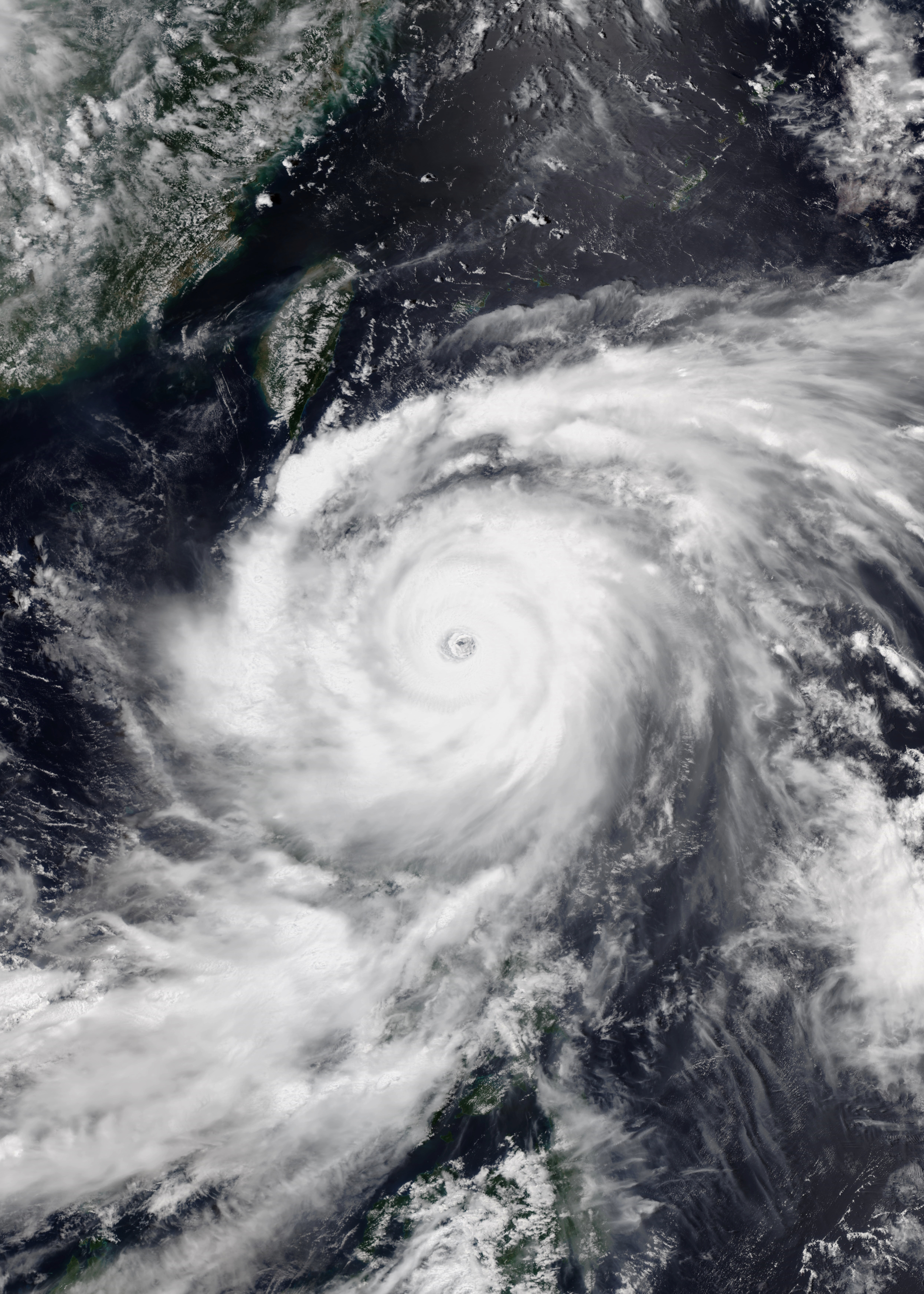
Typhoon Doksuri at peak intensity near Luzon

The costliest typhoon on record was Typhoon Doksuri in 2023, which caused over $28 billion in damages, primarily in China. Typhoon Hagibis in 2019 was responsible for over $17 billion in damages. Typhoon Yagi in 2024 is the third-costliest in nominal terms, causing over $14 billion in damages, while Typhoon Jebi in 2018 is the fourth-costliest, causing $13 billion in damages. Adjusting for inflation, Typhoon Mireille of 1991 is the second-costliest typhoon on record with it causing $18.4 billion (2018 USD) in damages. Without adjusting for inflation, it is tied with Typhoon Faxai of 2019 with both systems causing $10 billion in damages. Typhoons Lekima, Songda, and Saomai caused over $9 billion in damages in 2019, 2004, and 2000, respectively.

Costliest Pacific typhoons (adjusted for inflation)
Rank (Nominal)	Typhoon	Season	Damage (Nominal USD)	Inflation-adjusted Damage (2025 USD)
1	4 Doksuri	2023	$28.6 billion	$30.2 billion
2	5 Hagibis	2019	$17.3 billion	$21.8 billion
3	5 Yagi	2024	$14.7 billion	$15.1 billion
4	5 Jebi	2018	$13 billion	$16.7 billion
5	2 Fitow	2013	$10.4 billion	$14.4 billion
6	4 Mireille	1991	$10 billion	$23.6 billion
6	4 Faxai	2019	$10 billion	$12.6 billion
8	4 Songda	2004	$9.3 billion	$15.9 billion
9	4 Lekima	2019	$9.28 billion	$11.7 billion
10	5 Saomai	2000	$9.24 billion	$17.3 billion

== North Indian Ocean ==
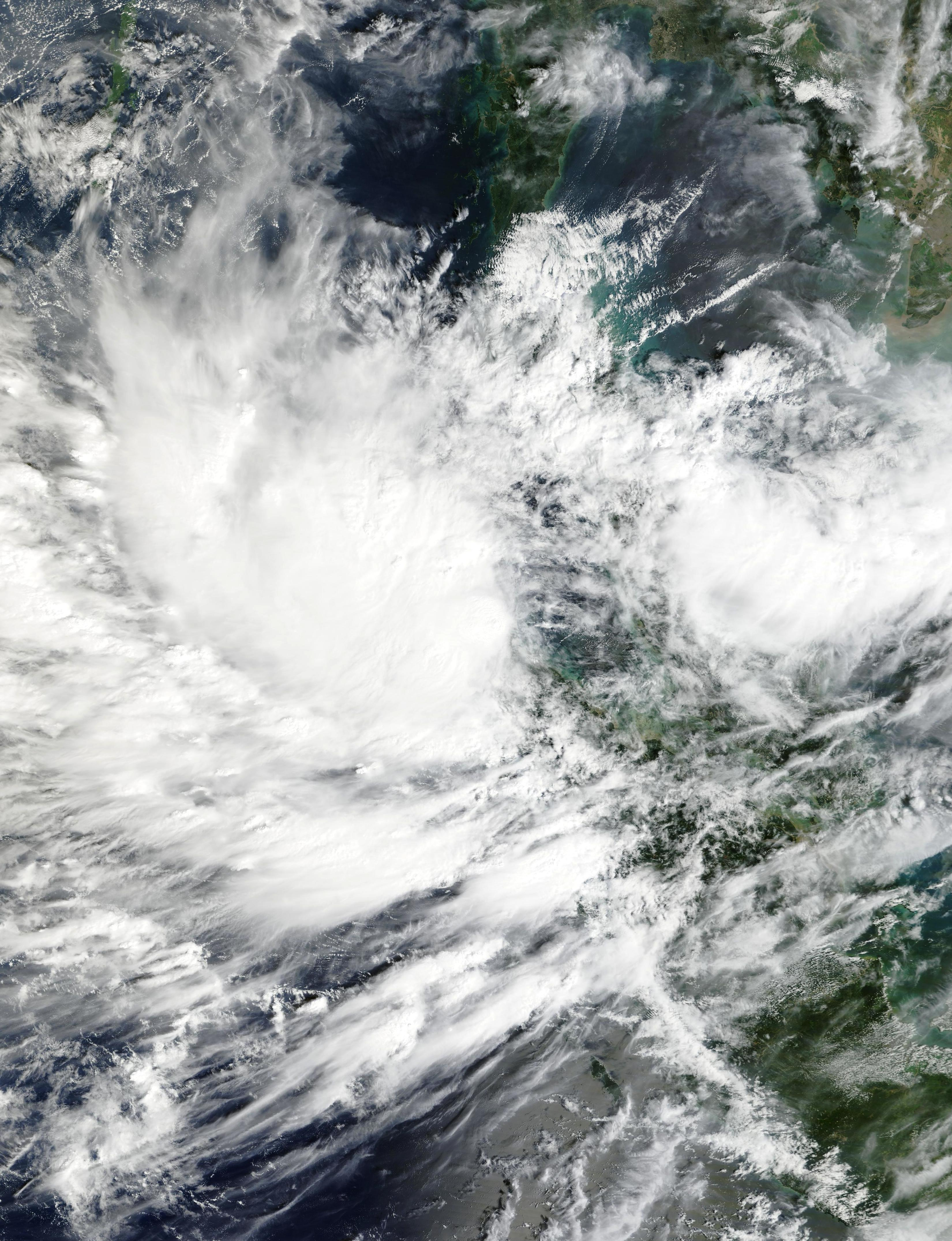
Cyclone Senyar making landfall in Sumatra

The costliest North Indian Ocean cyclone on record was Cyclone Senyar in 2025, which caused over $19 billion in damages. Cyclone Amphan became the second costliest cyclone in 2020 after causing $15.5 billion in damages. Cyclone Gonu is the costliest tropical cyclone in the Arabian Sea. Other costly cyclones include Cyclones Fani, the 1999 Odisha cyclone, and Cyclone Phailin.

Costliest North Indian Ocean tropical cyclones
Rank (Nominal)	Tropical cyclones	Season	Damage (Nominal USD)	Inflation-Adjusted Damage (2025 USD)
1	TS Senyar	2025	$19.8 billion	$19.8 billion
2	5 Amphan	2020	$15.5 billion	$19.3 billion
3	4 Nargis	2008	$15.3 billion	$22.9 billion
4	5 Fani	2019	$8.1 billion	$10.2 billion
5	5 "Odisha"	1999	$4.44 billion	$8.58 billion
6	5 Gonu	2007	$4.42 billion	$6.86 billion
7	5 Phailin	2013	$4.26 billion	$5.89 billion
8	4 Hudhud	2014	$3.58 billion	$4.87 billion
9	3 Bulbul	2019	$3.41 billion	$4.29 billion
10	2 Vardah	2016	$3.38 billion	$4.53 billion

== South-West Indian Ocean ==
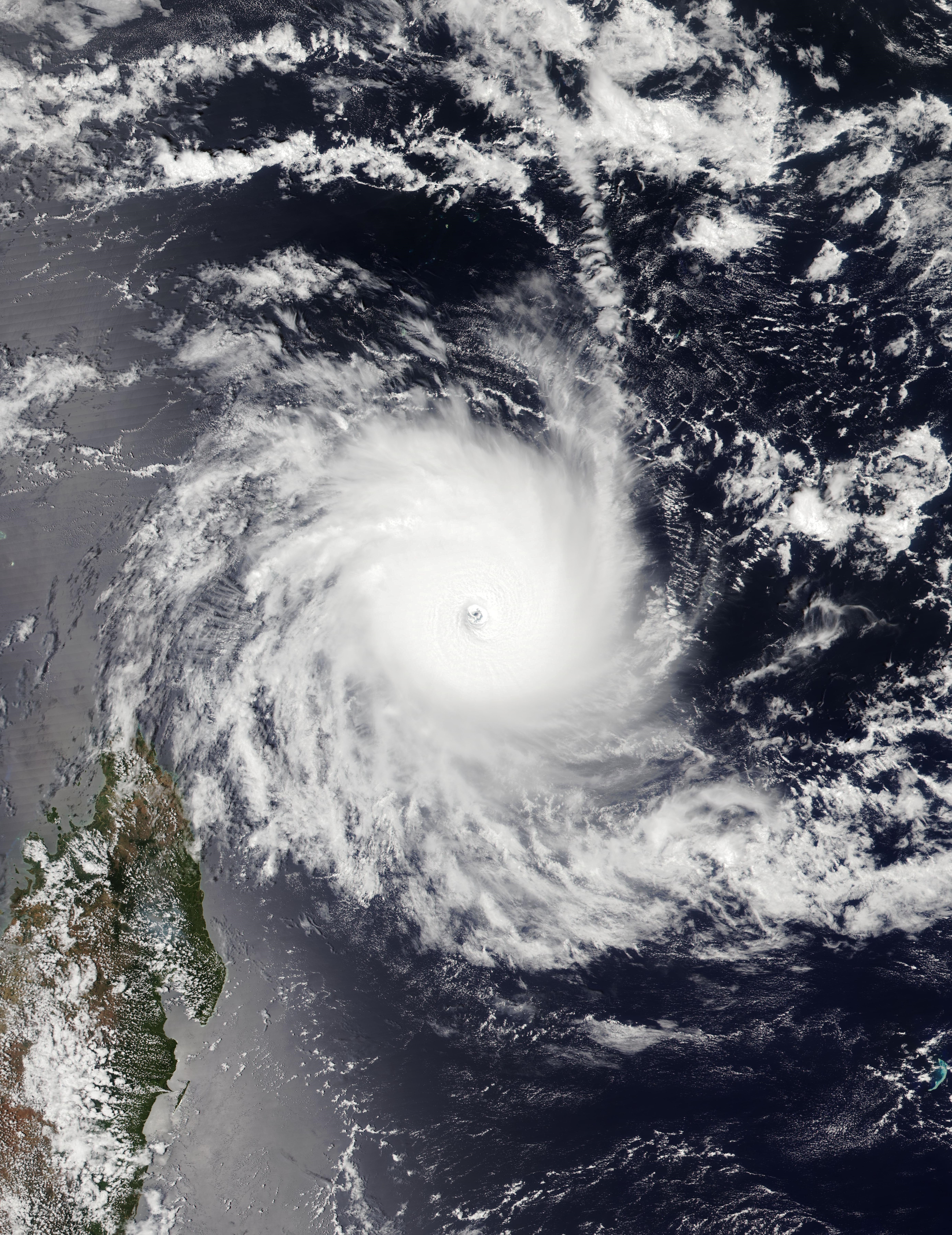
Cyclone Chido at peak intensity on December 12.

Only twelve South-West Indian Ocean tropical cyclones are known to have caused at least $250 million in damages. Among these, the costliest on record was Cyclone Chido in 2024, which caused $3.9 billion in damages. Other costly cyclones include Idai in 2019, Gezani in 2026, and Freddy in 2023; respectively, the three cyclones caused $3.3 billion, $2 billion, and $1.53 billion in damages.

Costliest South-West Indian Ocean tropical cyclones
Rank (Nominal)	Cyclone	Season	Damage (Nominal USD)	Inflation-Adjusted Damage (2026 USD)
1	4 Chido	2024–25	$3.9 billion	$4 billion
2	4 Idai	2018–19	$3.3 billion	$4.23 billion
3	3 Gezani	2025–26	$2 billion	$2 billion
4	5 Freddy	2022–23	$1.53 billion	$1.68 billion
5	3 Garance	2024–25	$1.05 billion	$1.08 billion
6	3 Fytia	2025–26	$475 million	$475 million
7	4 Enawo	2016–17	$400 million	$525 million
8	4 Kenneth	2018–19	$345 million	$430 million
9	4 Leon–Eline	1999–00	$309 million	$578 million
10	4 Dina	2001–02	$287 million	$514 million

== Australian region ==
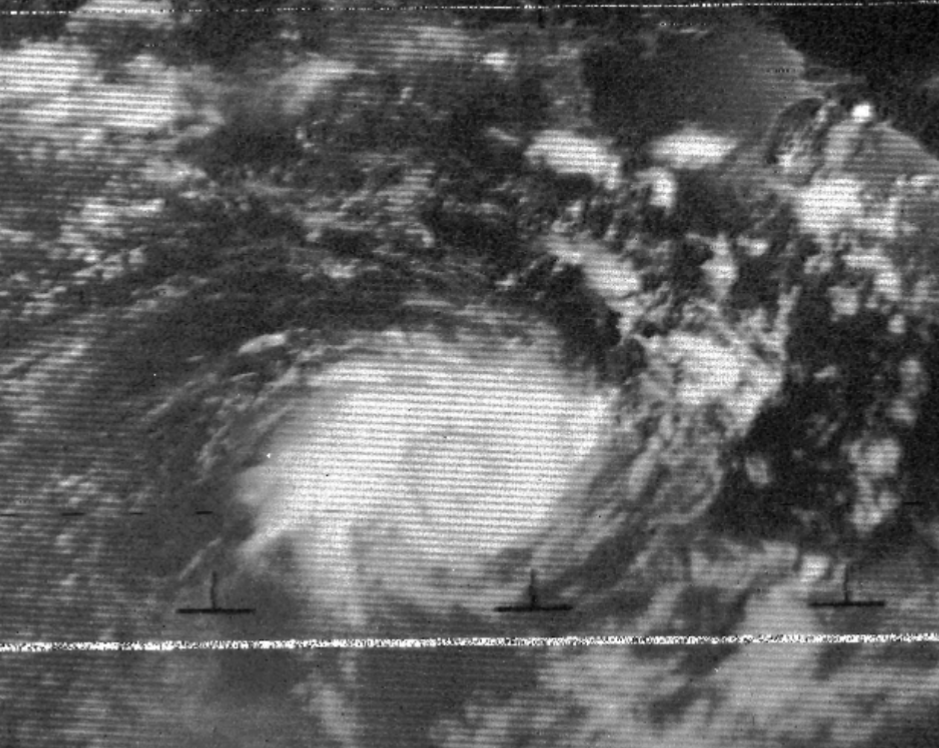
Cyclone Tracy at landfall in the Northern Territory on December 25, 1974

The costliest Australian region tropical cyclone on record was Cyclone Yasi in 2011, which caused $3.6 billion in damages. The next-costliest cyclone, Debbie, caused $2.73 billion in damages and is closely followed by Oswald, which caused $2.52 billion in damages. Additionally, Cyclones Alfred, Veronica, Ita, and Larry caused over $1 billion in damages in 2025, 2019, 2014, and 2006 respectively. Cyclone Tracy is considered one of Australia's most destructive cyclones. While only causing $645 million in damages, (Note: Adjusted for inflation, damages are the highest on record, at $7.69 billion.) 66 people were killed and over 25,000 people were left homeless.

Costliest Australian region tropical cyclones
Rank (Nominal)	Cyclone	Season	Damage (Nominal USD)	Inflation-Adjusted Damage (2025 USD)
1	4 Yasi	2010–11	$3.6 billion	$5.32 billion
2	4 Debbie	2016–17	$2.73 billion	$3.66 billion
3	TS Oswald	2012–13	$2.52 billion	$3.53 billion
4	4 Alfred	2024–25	$1.25 billion	$1.28 billion
5	4 Veronica	2018–19	$1.2 billion	$1.54 billion
6	5 Ita	2013–14	$1.15 billion	$1.59 billion
7	4 Larry	2005–06	$1.1 billion	$1.81 billion
8	4 Zelia	2024–25	$733 million	$752 million
9	4 Jasper	2023–24	$670 million	$708 million
10	3 Tracy	1974–75	$645 million	$4.21 billion

== South Pacific Ocean ==
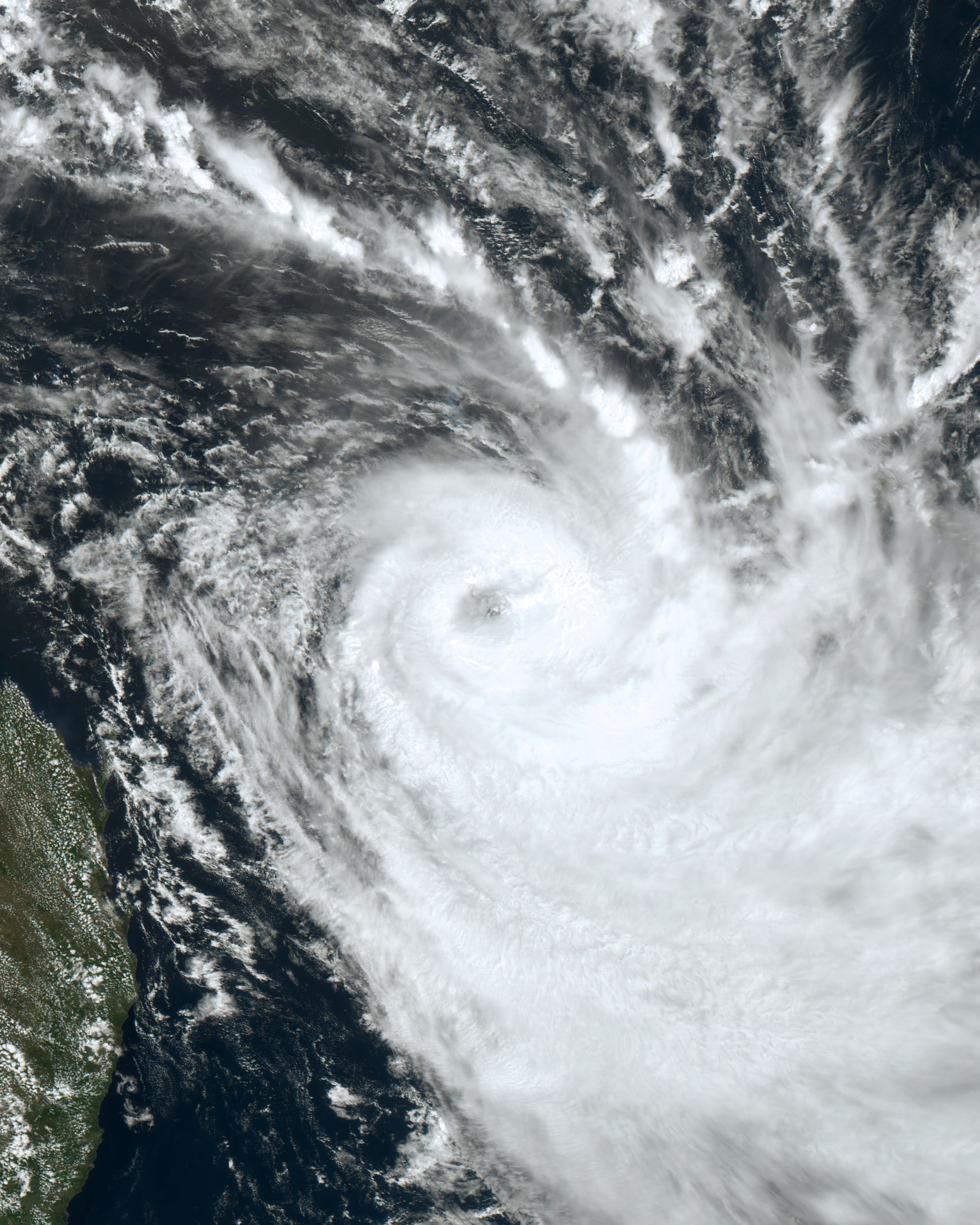
Cyclone Gabrielle at peak intensity. It would later strike New Zealand as a subtropical cyclone.

The costliest South Pacific tropical cyclone was Cyclone Gabrielle in 2023, which caused $9.2 billion in damages. The next costliest, Tropical Depression 06F in 2023, caused $1.43 billion in damages. Other costly South Pacific cyclones include Cyclone Winston in 2016, Cyclone Harold in 2020, and Cyclone Pam in 2015.

Costliest South Pacific Ocean tropical cyclones
Rank	Tropical cyclones	Season	Damage USD	Refs
1	3 Gabrielle	2022–23	$9.2 billion	
2	TD 06F	2022–23	$1.43 billion	
3	5 Winston	2015–16	$1.4 billion	
4	5 Harold	2019–20	$768 million	
5	5 Pam	2014–15	$543 million	
6	5 Judy and Kevin	2022–23	$433 million	
7	4 Val	1991–92	$381 million	
8	5 Lola	2023–24	$352 million	
9	4 Evan	2012–13	$313 million	
10	4 Gita	2017–18	$253 million	

== Mediterranean Sea ==
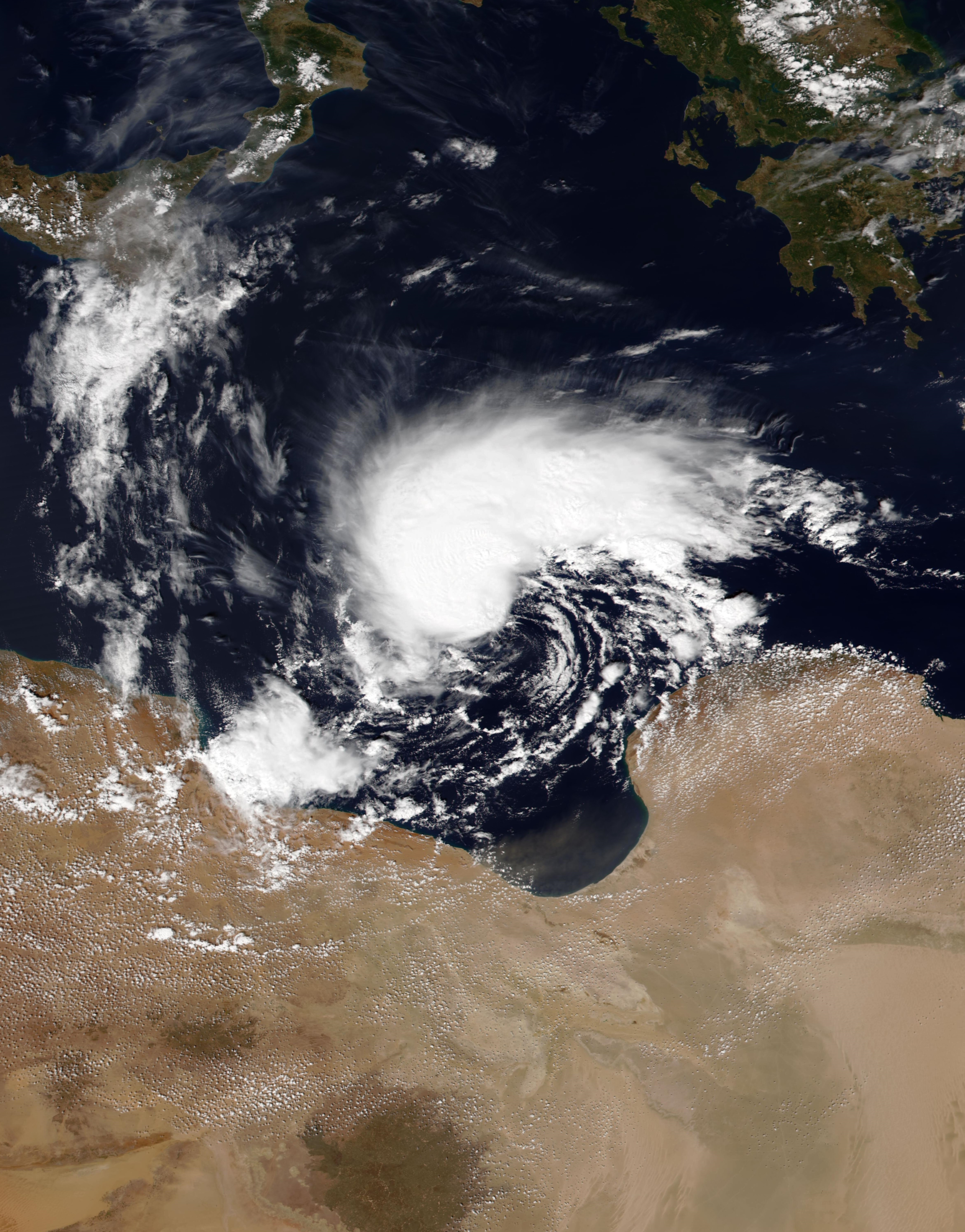
Storm Daniel was responsible for over 5,000 confirmed deaths in Libya.

The costliest Mediterranean tropical-like cyclone is Storm Daniel in 2023, which caused $21.14 billion in damages in Greece and Libya. The next costliest is Tropical Storm Rolf in 2011, which caused over $1.25 billion in damages. Other costly Mediterranean tropical-like cyclones include Cyclone Qendresa in 2014, Cyclone Apollo in 2021, Cyclone Numa in 2017, and Cyclone Ianos in 2020.

Costliest Mediterranean tropical-like cyclones
Rank (Nominal)	Cyclone	Season	Damage (Nominal USD)	Inflation-Adjusted Damage (2025 USD)
1	TS Daniel	2023	$21.1 billion	$22.3 billion
2	TS Rolf	2011	$1.25 billion	$1.79 billion
3	TS Qendresa	2014	$250 million	$340 million
4	TS Apollo	2021	$245 million	$291 million
5	TS Numa	2017	$100 million	$131 million
5	2 Ianos	2020	$100 million	$124 million
7	1 Zorbas	2018	$1 million	$1.3 million
7	TS Blas	2021	$1 million	$1.2 million

== Elsewhere ==
Only two South Atlantic tropical cyclones have caused measurable amounts of damages. In 2004, Hurricane Catarina caused $350 million in damages when it made landfall as a Category 2 tropical cyclone in Santa Catarina. In 2022, Subtropical Storm Yakecan caused $50 million in damages in Uruguay and Southern Brazil.

In the eastern portion of the South Pacific, tropical cyclone formation is extremely rare, and Cyclone Yaku in 2023 is the only known system to impact land, causing $690 million in damages in Peru and Ecuador.

== See also ==
- Outline of tropical cyclones
- List of disasters by cost
- List of the deadliest tropical cyclones
- List of the most intense tropical cyclones
