= Cyclone Tracy =

Australian region cyclone in 1974

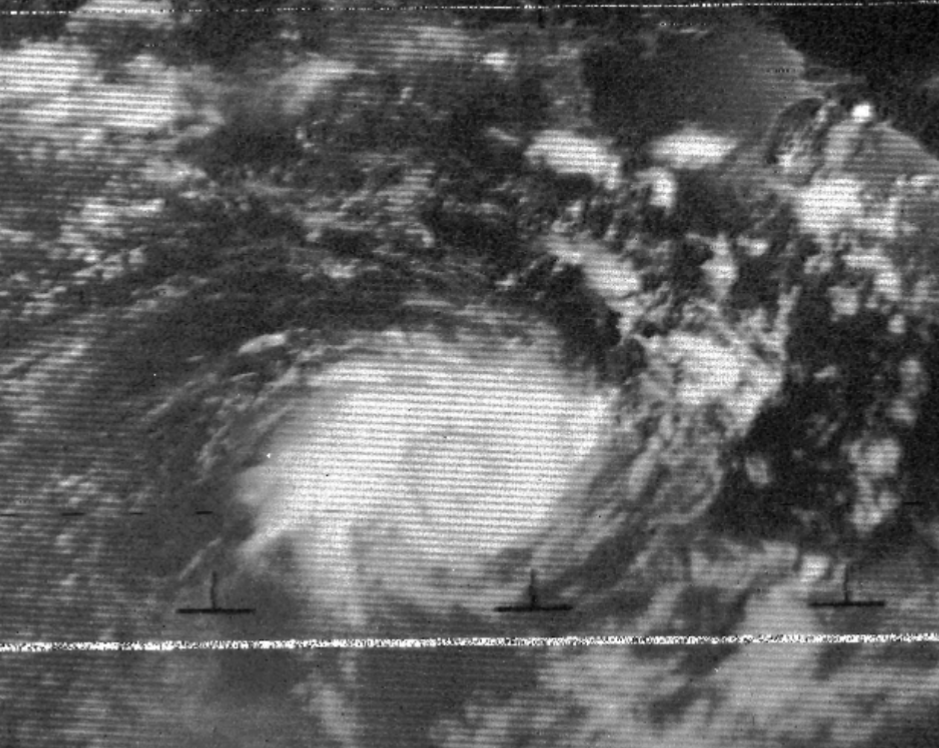
- Cyclone Tracy at peak intensity shortly before landfall on Christmas Day

Meteorological history
- Formed: 21 December 1974
- Dissipated: 26 December 1974

Category 4 severe tropical cyclone
- 10-minute sustained (Aus)
- Highest winds: 175 km/h (110 mph)
- Lowest pressure: 950 hPa (mbar); 28.05 inHg

Category 3-equivalent tropical cyclone
- 1-minute sustained (SSHWS/JTWC)
- Highest winds: 205 km/h (125 mph)

Overall effects
- Fatalities: 66
- Damage: $645 million (1974 USD) (Second-costliest in the Australian region when adjusted for inflation)
- Areas affected: Tiwi Islands, Northern Territory
- Part of the 1974–75 Australian region cyclone season

Severe Tropical Cyclone Tracy was a small but destructive tropical cyclone that devastated the city of Darwin, in the Northern Territory of Australia, in December 1974. The small but developing easterly storm was originally expected to pass clear of the city, but it turned towards it early on 24 December. After 10:00 p.m. ACST, damage became severe, with wind gusts reaching 217 km/h (117 kn; 135 mph) before instruments failed. The anemometer in Darwin Airport control tower had its needle bent in half by the strength of the gusts.

Residents of Darwin were celebrating Christmas, and they did not immediately acknowledge the emergency, partly because they had been alerted to an earlier cyclone (Selma) which passed west of the city, not affecting it in any way. Additionally, news outlets had only a skeleton crew on duty over the holiday.

The fatality count from Tracy was 66 people, while the damage it caused was A$838 million (about A$7.69 billion in 2022; approximately US$5.2 billion in 2022). It destroyed more than 70 percent of Darwin's buildings, including 80 percent of houses. It left more than 25,000 out of the 47,000 inhabitants of the city homeless prior to landfall and required the evacuation of over 30,000 people, of whom many never returned. After the storm passed, the city was rebuilt using more stringent standards "to cyclone code". At the time, Tracy held the record worldwide for the smallest tropical cyclone in terms of gale-force wind diameter, a record that was held for 34 years until it was broken by Tropical Storm Marco in the Atlantic basin of 2008.

== Meteorological history ==
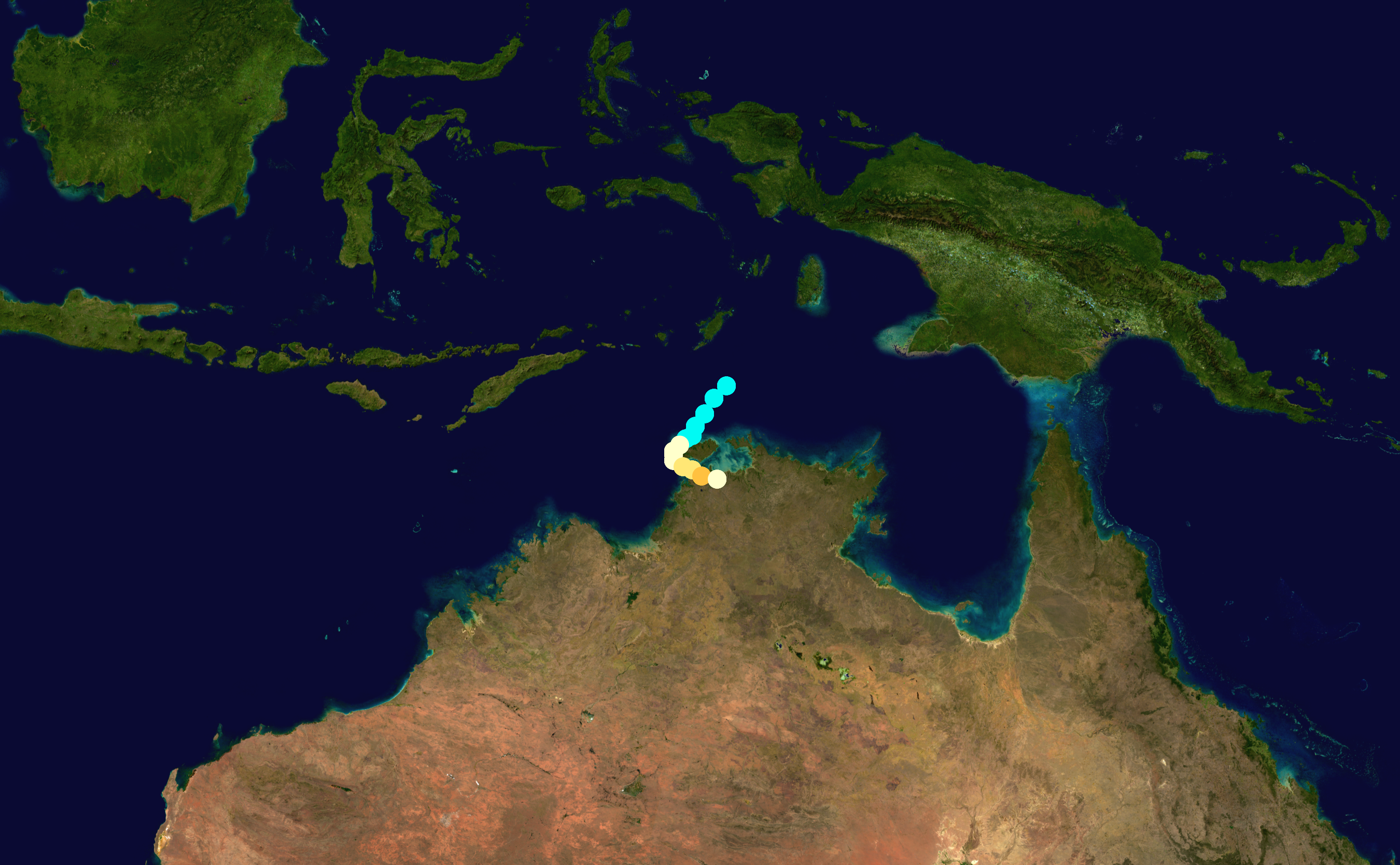
Map plotting the storm's track and intensity, according to the Saffir–Simpson scale Map key Saffir–Simpson scale Tropical depression (≤38 mph, ≤62 km/h) Tropical storm (39–73 mph, 63–118 km/h) Category 1 (74–95 mph, 119–153 km/h) Category 2 (96–110 mph, 154–177 km/h) Category 3 (111–129 mph, 178–208 km/h) Category 4 (130–156 mph, 209–251 km/h) Category 5 (≥157 mph, ≥252 km/h) Unknown Storm type Tropical cyclone Subtropical cyclone Extratropical cyclone, remnant low, tropical disturbance, or monsoon depression

On 20 December 1974, the United States' ESSA-8 environmental satellite recorded a large cloud mass centred over the Arafura Sea about 370 km (230 mi) northeast of Darwin. This disturbance was tracked by the Darwin Weather Bureau's regional director Ray Wilkie, and by senior meteorologist Geoff Crane. On 21 December, the ESSA-8 satellite showed evidence of a newly formed circular centre near latitude 8° south and longitude 135° east. Crane - the meteorological duty officer at the time - issued the initial tropical cyclone alert, describing the storm as a tropical low that could develop into a tropical cyclone.

Later in the evening, the Darwin meteorological office received an infrared satellite image from the National Oceanic and Atmospheric Administration's satellite, NOAA-4, showing that the low pressure had developed further and that spiralling clouds could be observed. The storm was officially pronounced a tropical cyclone at around 10 p.m. on 21 December, when it was around 200 km (125 mi) to the north-northeast of Cape Don (360 km (225 mi) northeast of Darwin). Cyclone Tracy was first observed on the Darwin radar on the morning of 22 December.

Over the next few days, the cyclone moved in a southwesterly direction, passing north of Darwin on 22 December. A broadcast on ABC Radio that day stated that Cyclone Tracy posed no immediate threat to Darwin. However, early in the morning of 24 December, Tracy rounded Cape Fourcroy on the western tip of Bathurst Island, and moved in a southeasterly direction, straight towards Darwin. The bureau's weather station at Cape Fourcroy measured a mean wind speed of 120 km/h (75 mph) at 9:00 that morning.

By late afternoon on 24 December, the sky over the city was heavily overcast, with low clouds, and was experiencing strong rain. Wind gusts increased in strength; between 10 p.m. (local time) and midnight, the damage became serious, and residents began to realise that the cyclone would not pass by the city, but over it. On 25 December at around 3:30 a.m., Tracy's centre crossed the coast near Fannie Bay. The highest recorded wind gust from the cyclone was 217 kilometres per hour (135 mph), which was recorded around 3:05 a.m. at Darwin Airport. The anemometer (wind speed instrument) failed at around 3:10 a.m., with the wind vane (wind direction) destroyed after the cyclone's eye passed over. The Bureau of Meteorology's official estimates suggested that Tracy's gusts had reached 240 kilometres per hour (150 mph). The lowest air pressure reading during Tracy was 950 hectopascals (28.05 inHg), which was taken at around 4 a.m., by a Bureau staff member at Darwin Airport. This was recorded during the eye of the cyclone. From around 6:30 a.m., the winds began to ease, with the rainfall ceasing at around 8:30 a.m. After making landfall, Tracy rapidly weakened, dissipating on 26 December. Total rainfall in Darwin from Cyclone Tracy was at least 255 mm (10.0 in).

The relative sizes of the United States, Cyclone Tracy and Typhoon Tip, the second smallest and largest tropical storms ever recorded, respectively

== Preparations ==
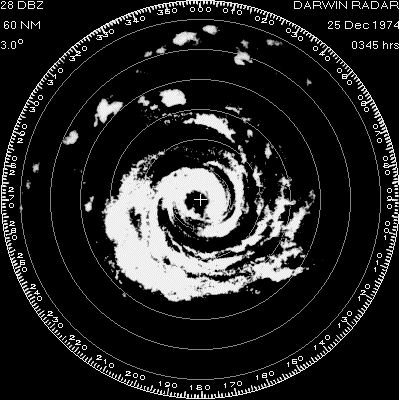
Tracy before making landfall on Darwin

Darwin had been severely battered by cyclones before: in January 1897 and again in March 1937. However, in the 20 years leading up to Cyclone Tracy, the city had undergone a period of rapid expansion. E.P. Milliken estimated that on the eve of the cyclone there were 43,500 people living in 12,000 dwellings in the Darwin area. Though building standards at the time required that some attention be given to the possibility of cyclones, most buildings were not capable of withstanding the force of a cyclone's direct hit.

On the day of the cyclone, most residents of Darwin believed that the cyclone would not cause any damage to the city. Cyclone Selma had been predicted to hit Darwin earlier in the month, but it instead went north and dissipated without affecting Darwin in any way. As a result, Cyclone Tracy took most Darwin residents by surprise. Despite several warnings, the people of Darwin did not evacuate or prepare for the cyclone. Many residents continued to prepare for Christmas, and many attended Christmas parties despite the increasing winds and heavy rain. Journalist Bill Bunbury interviewed the residents of Darwin sometime later and recorded the experiences of the survivors of the cyclone in his book Cyclone Tracy: Picking Up the Pieces. Resident Dawn Lawrie, a 1971 independent candidate for the electorate of Nightcliff, told him:

We'd had a cyclone warning only 10 days before Tracy [that another cyclone (Selma)] was coming, it was coming, and it never came. So when we started hearing about Tracy we were all a little blasé. (Bunbury, p. 20)

Another resident, Barbara Langkrens, said:

And you started to almost think that it would never happen to Darwin even though we had cyclone warnings on the radio all the time ... most of the people who had lived here for quite some time didn't really believe the warnings. (Bunbury, p. 21)

== Impact ==
Devastation in Darwin

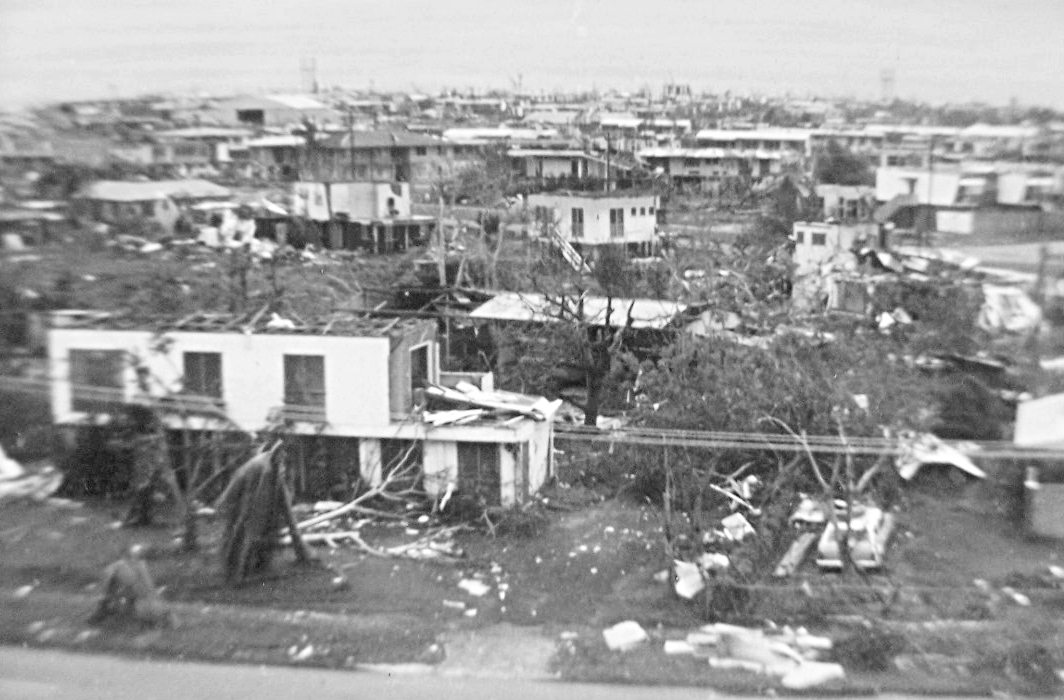
Houses after the destruction caused by Tracy

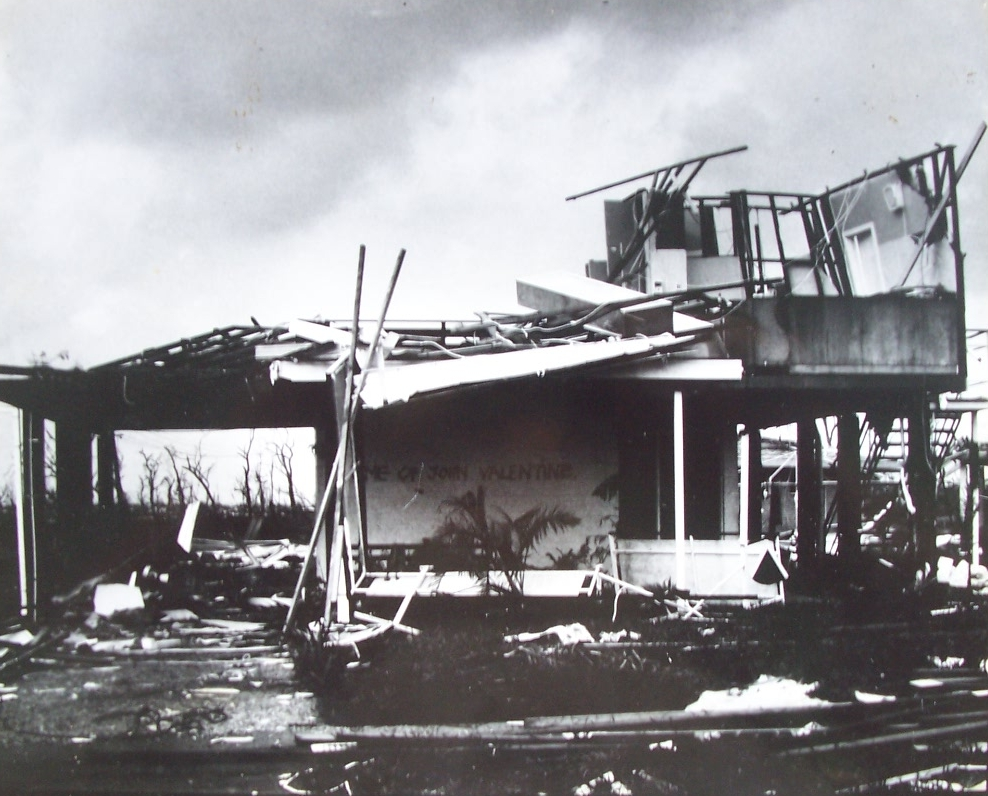
House in Nakara, Northern suburbs, after Tracy

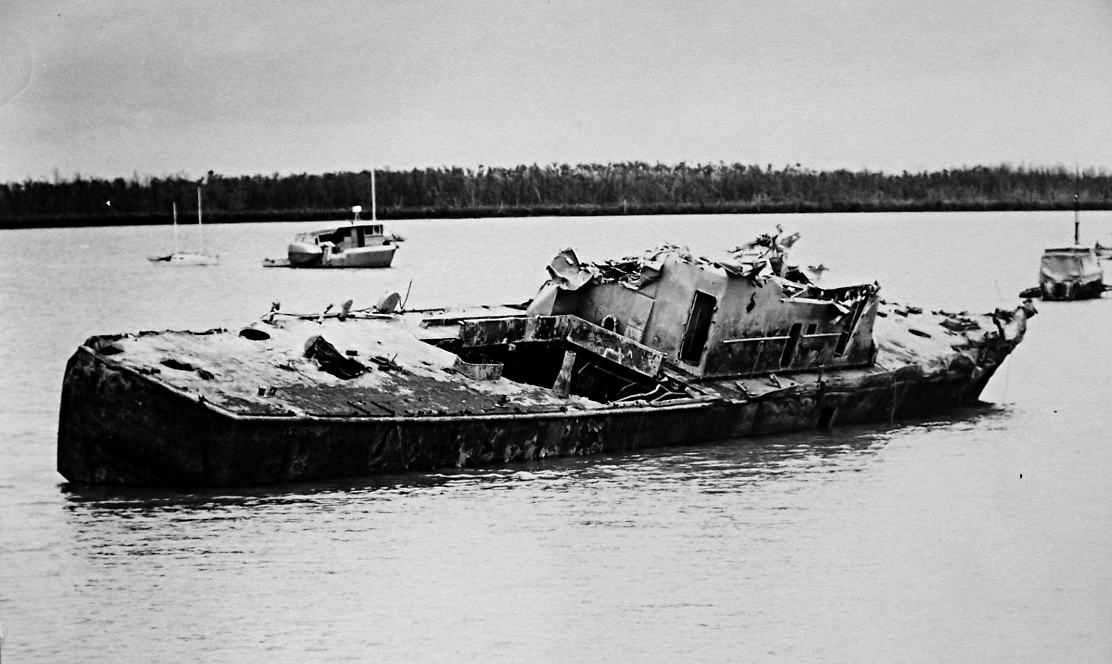
HMAS Arrow beached in Francis Bay March 1975

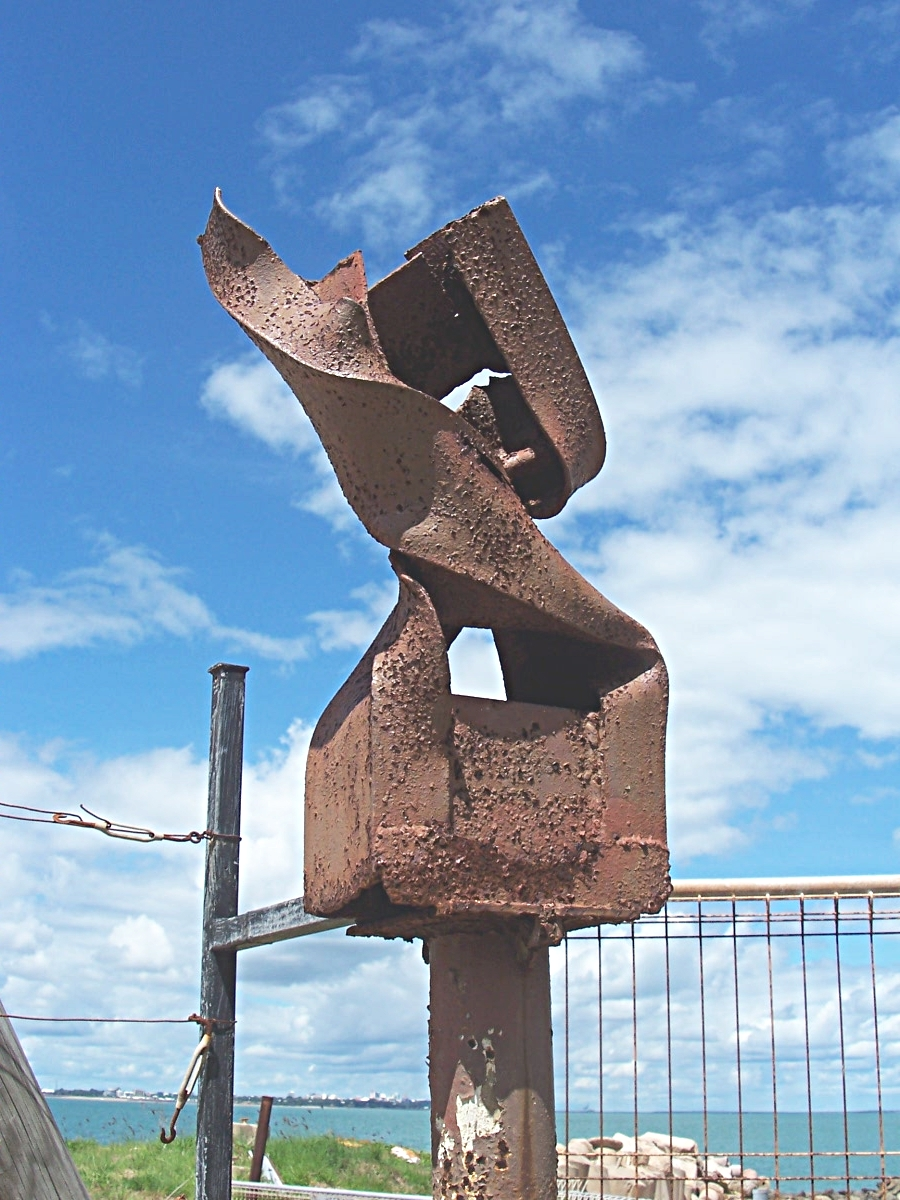
The base of a steel electricity pole bent by Tracy

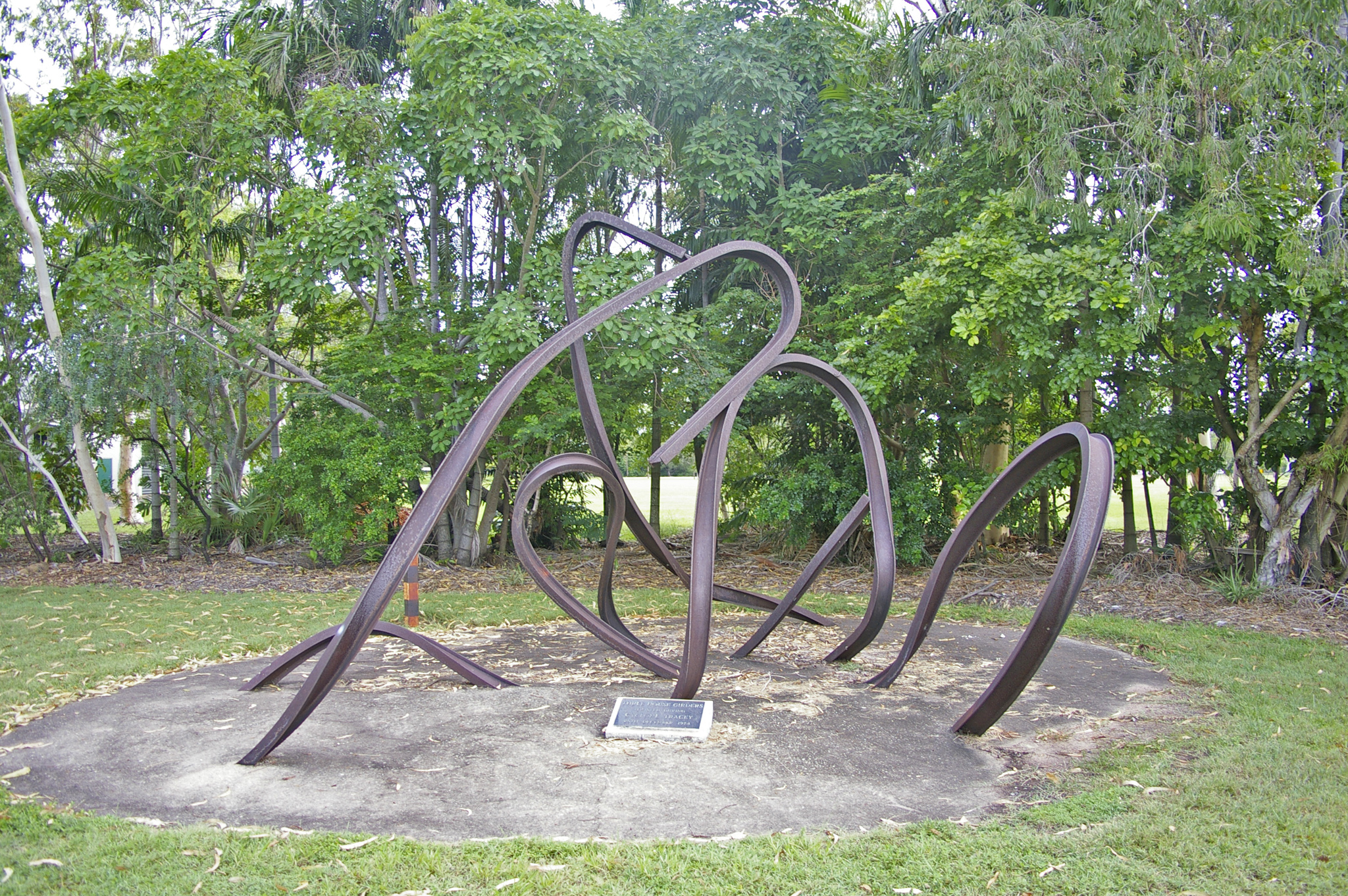
Memorial at Casuarina High School assembled from three house girders twisted by Cyclone Tracy

Cyclone Tracy destroyed about 80% of the Darwin city. 94% of housing was uninhabitable. At Darwin Airport, thirty-one aircraft were destroyed and another twenty-five badly damaged.

=== Deaths ===
Cyclone Tracy killed 66 people on land and at sea. In the cyclone's aftermath, the number of deaths reported varied from 49 to 66, as an official list of deaths was never compiled. Nearly thirty years later, the last two missing ships were located in Darwin Harbour, MV Booya in October 2003 and the ferry Darwin Princess in May 2004. Police divers investigated both wrecks and found no human remains but did retrieve some personal effects. In March 2005, the Northern Territory Coroner held an inquest into the people suspected to have died on board, declaring them deaths at sea. Following the inquest, the death total was raised to 71, and this was widely published. However recent research by the Museum and Art Gallery of the Northern Territory has determined that this figure includes five deaths that were double counted, reducing the overall total to 66. Of these, 45 died on land and 21 died at sea.

=== Reporting ===
Several factors delayed the dissemination of the news of the cyclone's impact to the country. The intensity and track of the cyclone had destroyed virtually all telecommunication and radio equipment in the city, including the transmission equipment at both Royal Australian Navy bases HMAS Melville and HMAS Coonawarra. The first communication link reestablished in the aftermath was via HF Radio sourced from a Connellan Airways de Havilland Heron that had been hastily stored in an empty hangar at Darwin Airport the night before, being anchored to towing equipment and weighed down with 350 kg (770 lb) of beer cartons. From this aircraft, pilot David Fredrickson contacted the Katherine Flight Service Center by mid-morning to convey news of the disaster. He then spent much of the day relaying messages on behalf of emergency services, Navy personnel and airport staff until additional communication links were established later in the day.

The destruction of transportation infrastructure and the distance between Darwin and the rest of the Australian population played a role in the delayed information dissemination, as did the fact the storm made landfall on Christmas Day and most media outlets only had a skeleton crew rostered on at best. Most Australians were not aware of the cyclone until late in the afternoon. Dick Muddimer, a reporter for the local ABC radio station, 8DR, credited as being the man who informed the rest of the nation about the cyclone, after finding out that the ABC's studios on Cavenagh Street were completely knocked off transmission, was able to travel through the wreckage and the storm to the studios of the local television station NTD-8 to send a message to the ABC station in Mount Isa, Queensland, to notify ABC headquarters in Sydney that Darwin had been hit by a cyclone.

=== Governance ===
In order to provide the initial emergency response, a committee was created. The committee, composed of several high-level public servants and police, stated that, "Darwin had, for the time being, ceased to exist as a city". Gough Whitlam, the Australian prime minister, was on an official trip to Europe at the time and flew to Darwin immediately upon hearing of the disaster. Additionally, the Australian government began a mass evacuation by road and air; all of the Defence Force personnel throughout Australia, along with the entire Royal Australian Air Force's fleet of transport planes, were recalled from holiday leave and deployed to evacuate civilians from Darwin as well as to bring essential relief supplies to the area. Thirteen RAN ships were used to transport supplies to the area as part of Operation Navy Help Darwin, which is the largest humanitarian or disaster relief operation ever performed by the Royal Australian Navy.

=== Health and essential services crisis ===
As soon as the worst of the storm had passed, Darwin faced several immediate health crises. On Christmas Day, the Darwin Hospital treated well over five hundred patients, with 112 of these being admitted into the hospital, and both of the facility's operating theatres being utilised. The first casualties did not arrive till 7 a.m. because of high winds and severe road conditions in and around the Darwin area. Operating continued throughout the night and into the early morning. Local teams worked without relief until the arrival of a surgical team from Canberra late that day. Those who were considered unable to return to work within two weeks were evacuated by air to safer locations.

All official communications out of Darwin were no longer operational. The antennas at the OTC Coastal Radio Service station (callsign VID) were destroyed during the storm. Station manager Bob Hooper, who was an amateur radio operator, helped to establish communications using his own equipment. By 10 a.m., Gary Gibson, another amateur operator, was able to establish a station at the Darwin Community College, and within a short period of time, a network of stations was established across the country. This network, coordinated by Melbourne D24 police, provided message services to the cities of Perth, Melbourne, Sydney, Canberra, Townsville, Brisbane, Adelaide, Alice Springs, Gove, Mount Isa, Cairns, Rockhampton, Mackay, Lismore and Cooma. By 10:40 a.m., VID operators had established VID2 on board Nyanda in Darwin Harbour, and then for five days official communications traffic in and out of Darwin was handled via continuous wave radio (Morse code). The only local radio station that was not completely disabled was the ABC's 8DR. For the next two days, it was Darwin's only link to the outside world and was on the air for all but 34 hours in the coming weeks.

Those who remained in Darwin faced the threat of several diseases due to much of the city being without water, electricity, or basic sanitation. An initial response was to vaccinate residents for typhoid and cholera. Approximately 30,000 people were homeless and were forced to seek shelter in several makeshift housing and emergency centres that lacked proper hygienic conditions. Volunteers came in from across the country to assist with the emergency relief efforts. Trench latrines were dug, water supplies delivered by tankers, and mass immunisation programs begun. The army was given the task of searching houses for bodies of people and animals, as well as locating other health risks; for example, cleaning out rotting contents from fridges and freezers across the city. This was completed within a week. Houses which had been "searched and cleared" had S&C painted on an external wall. The city itself was sprayed with malathion to control mosquitoes and other similar pests.

Attempts to reconnect the essential services to the city began on Christmas Day. Local officers from the Commonwealth Department of Housing and Construction began clearing debris and working to restore power. They sealed off damaged water hydrants and activated pumps to reactivate the city's water and sewerage systems.

=== Evacuation and the public response ===
Major-General Alan Stretton, director-general of the Natural Disasters Organization, and the commonwealth minister for the Northern Territory, Rex Patterson, arrived at Darwin Airport late on Christmas Day and took charge of the relief efforts. After an assessment of the situation and meetings with the Department of the Northern Territory and the relevant minister, it was concluded that Darwin's population needed to be reduced to a "safe level" of 10,500 people. This decision was made on the advice of Dr. Charles Gurd, the director of health in the Northern Territory. Around 10,000 people left Darwin and the surrounding area within the first two days, but the rate of departures then began to slow down. The government then gave support to his position, offering full reimbursement of personal costs, as long as the evacuation took place.

The population was evacuated by air and ground; because of communications difficulties with Darwin airport, landing was limited to one plane every ninety minutes. At major airports, teams of federal and territory department officials as well as Salvation Army and Red Cross workers met refugees, with the Red Cross taking responsibility for keeping track of the names and temporary addresses of the refugees. Evacuations were prioritised according to need; women, children, the elderly, and the sick were evacuated first. There were reports of men dressing up as women to escape with the early evacuations. Between 26 and 31 December, a total of 35,362 people were evacuated from Darwin. Of those, 25,628 were evacuated by air, the remainder by road.

Most evacuation flights were conducted onboard commercial aircraft sent by Ansett, TAA, MMA and Qantas, with a majority of these flights being filled to upwards of 150% their normal passenger capacity. One particular evacuation flight, a Qantas Boeing 747-238B (VH-EBB) departed Darwin on 28 December with a record breaking 673 evacuees on board. By 31 December, only 10,638 people (mostly men who were required to help clean up the city) remained in Darwin. Stretton also regulated access to the city by means of a permit system. Permits were issued only to those who were involved in either the relief or reconstruction efforts, and were used to prevent the early return of those who had been evacuated.

Upon receiving news of the damage, several community groups across Australia began fundraising and relief efforts to assist the survivors. Major reception centres were set up in cities such as Katherine, Tennant Creek and Alice Springs. Several of the small towns along the Stuart Highway made efforts to assist people who were fleeing by road, supplying them with food, fuel, rest, and mechanical aid. At Adelaide River, the small local population provided hot meals to the refugees who stopped there. Approximately 24 hours after the storm hit Darwin, the population of Alice Springs had raised over $105,000 (~A$665,000 in 2022 terms) to assist the victims of Tracy. In Melbourne at the Boxing Day Test cricket match between Australia and England, members of both teams moved around the boundaries carrying buckets which the crowd threw cash into for the relief funds. Darwin families were also given priority on public housing waiting lists. On 31 December 1974, Stretton recommended that full civilian control should resume in Darwin, and handed over control of the city to its elected officials.

== Aftermath ==
=== Reconstruction and effects on Darwin ===
Costliest Australian region tropical cyclones
| Rank | Tropical cyclones | Season | Damage |
|---|---|---|---|
| 1 | 4 Yasi | 2010–11 | $3.6 billion |
| 2 | 4 Debbie | 2016–17 | $2.73 billion |
| 3 | TS Oswald | 2012–13 | $2.52 billion |
| 4 | 4 Alfred | 2024–25 | $1.36 billion |
| 5 | 4 Veronica | 2018–19 | $1.2 billion |
| 6 | 5 Ita | 2013–14 | $1.15 billion |
| 7 | 4 Larry | 2005–06 | $1.1 billion |
| 8 | 4 Zelia | 2024–25 | $733 million |
| 9 | 4 Jasper | 2023–24 | $670 million |
| 10 | 3 Tracy | 1974–75 | $645 million |

In February 1975, Australian prime minister Gough Whitlam announced the creation of the Darwin Reconstruction Commission, which was given the task of rebuilding the city "within five years", focusing primarily on building houses. The commission was headed by Tony Powell. The damage to the city was so severe that some advocated moving the entire city. However, the government insisted that it be rebuilt in the same location. By May 1975, Darwin's population had recovered somewhat, with 30,000 residing in the city. Temporary housing, caravans, hotels, and an ocean liner (MV Patris), were used to house people, because reconstruction of permanent housing had not yet begun by September that year. Ella Stack became mayor of Darwin in May 1975 and was heavily involved in its reconstruction.

However, by the following April, and after receiving criticism for the slow speed of reconstruction, the commission had built 3,000 new homes in the nearly destroyed northern suburbs, and completed repairs to those that had survived the storm. Several new building codes were drawn up, trying to achieve the competing goals of the speedy recovery of the area and ensuring that there would be no repeat of the damage that Darwin took in 1974. By 1978, much of the city had recovered and was able to house almost the same number of people as it had before the cyclone hit. However, by the 1980s, as many as sixty percent of Darwin's 1974 population had left, never to return. In the years that followed, Darwin was almost entirely rebuilt and now shows almost no resemblance to the pre-Tracy Darwin of December 1974.

Although a legislative assembly had been set up earlier in the year, the Northern Territory had only minimal self-government, with a federal minister being responsible for the territory from Canberra. However, the cyclone and subsequent responses highlighted several problems with the way the regional government was set up. This led Malcolm Fraser, Whitlam's successor as prime minister, to give self-government to the Territory in 1978.

Many of the government records associated with Cyclone Tracy became publicly available on 1 January 2005 under the 30-year rule.

On 25 December 2024 – the 50th anniversary – a memorial was unveiled at East Point Reserve, where the cyclone made landfall. The memorial includes individual plaques with the names of the deceased.

=== In popular culture ===
Cyclone Tracy inspired the song "Santa Never Made It into Darwin", composed by Bill Cate and performed by Bill and Boyd in 1975 to raise money for the relief and reconstruction efforts. In 1983, Hoodoo Gurus released "Tojo", a song comparing the Japanese bombing of Darwin under the command of Hideki Tojo during World War II to the damage done by Cyclone Tracy. The much-feared Japanese invasion was stopped by the US and Australian militaries, but the cyclone was virtually ignored and ended up destroying the city. In May 1976, Australian band Ayers Rock released the single "Song for Darwin", also as a fundraiser for the relief and reconstruction efforts.

In 1986, the Nine Network and PBL created Cyclone Tracy, a period drama mini-series based on the events during the cyclone. Michael Fisher, Ted Roberts and Leon Saunders wrote the series, and it also starred Chris Haywood and Tracy Mann, who played the lead characters of Steve and Connie. The mini-series was released on DVD by Umbrella Entertainment in December 2005. The DVD is compatible with all region codes and includes special features such as newsreel footage of the devastation and a documentary titled On A Wind and a Prayer.

== Records and meteorological statistics ==
Tracy is the most compact cyclone or equivalent-strength cyclone on record in the Australian basin and Southern Hemisphere, with gale-force winds extending only 48 kilometres (30 mi) from the centre, and was also the smallest tropical cyclone worldwide until 2008, when Tropical Storm Marco of the 2008 Atlantic hurricane season broke the record, with gale-force winds extending only 18.5 kilometres (11.5 mi) from the centre. After forming over the Arafura Sea, the storm moved southwards and affected the city with Category 4 winds on the Australian cyclone intensity scale, while there is evidence to suggest that it had reached Category 3 on the Saffir–Simpson Hurricane Scale when it made landfall. Bruce Stannard of The Age stated that Cyclone Tracy was a "disaster of the first magnitude ... without parallel in Australia's history."

== Pressure estimates ==
David Longshore, in the book Encyclopedia of Hurricanes, Typhoons, and Cyclones 1992 and 2008 edition, states that Tracy's barometric pressure was as low as 914 mbar, but the actual lowest pressure was 950 mbar. This information was recorded by a Bureau of Meteorology staff member at the Darwin airport.

== See also ==
- Cyclone Tracy (1986 miniseries), starring Chris Haywood and Tracy Mann and Tony Barry
- Blown Away (2014 film), documentary film about Cyclone Tracy
