= I Wish I Were Only Lonely =

1989 song performed by Michelle Wright

Single by Michelle Wright

from the album Do Right by Me
- Released: 1989
- Genre: Country
- Length: 4:04
- Label: Savannah
- Songwriters: Steve Bogard; Rick Giles
- Producers: Steve Bogard; Rick Giles

Michelle Wright singles chronology
"Do Right by Me" (1988)	"I Wish I Were Only Lonely" (1989)	"Rock Me Gently" (1989)

"I Wish I Were Only Lonely" is a song recorded by Canadian country music artist Michelle Wright. It was released in 1989 as the fifth single from her debut album, Do Right by Me. It peaked at number 7 on the RPM Country Tracks chart in June 1989.

The song was also recorded by American country music artist Reba McEntire on her 1988 album Reba.

== Chart performance ==
Chart (1989)	Peak position
Canada Country Singles (RPM)	7

=== Year-end charts ===
Chart (1989)	Position
Canada Country Tracks (RPM)	66
