= Reba (album) =

Studio album by Reba McEntire
- Released: April 25, 1988
- Studios: Sound Stage Studios and Emerald Sound Studios (Nashville, Tennessee)
- Genre: Country
- Length: 35:46
- Label: MCA
- Producers: Jimmy Bowen; Reba McEntire

Reba McEntire chronology
Merry Christmas to You (1987)	Reba (1988)	Sweet Sixteen (1989)

Singles from Reba
- 1. "Sunday Kind of Love" Released: April 1988; 2. "I Know How He Feels" Released: August 1988; 3. "New Fool at an Old Game" Released: December 1988

Professional ratings
Review scores
Source	Rating
Allmusic	3.5/5 stars

Reba is the fourteenth studio album by American country music singer Reba McEntire. McEntire collaborated once again with former rockabilly artist and legendary music producer Jimmy Bowen, and the album was released on April 25, 1988. Gone were the honky tonk stable steel guitars and fiddles of My Kind of Country and Have I Got a Deal for You, to be replaced by a highly produced and orchestrated production. The album recalls to mind the music on the hit parade of the late 1940s and early 1950s. The Nashville and country-soul crossover sounds of the 1960s are also represented. Created before For My Broken Heart and It's Your Call, this was one of the first of McEntire's albums to have a conceptual feeling. This was created by song choice and the use of similar instrumentation and vocal arrangement throughout the album. Reba was a success.

The album was her third #1 country album, and two of its tracks, "I Know How He Feels" and "New Fool at an Old Game," reached No. 1 on the Billboard country singles charts.

A remake of an old jazz vocal standard made famous by Ella Fitzgerald, "Sunday Kind of Love" reached the #5 spot. Also covered was "Respect," a song made famous by Aretha Franklin.

The album debuted at #20 for the week of May 21, 1988, on the Country Albums chart, and peaked at #1 for the week of June 11, 1988. The album stayed at #1 for 6 consecutive weeks.

Three songs from the album, "Do Right By Me", "Wish I Were Only Lonely" and "New Fool At An Old Game", were previously recorded by Michelle Wright on her 1988 album, Do Right By Me.

== Track listing ==
No.	Title	Writer(s)	Length
1.	"So, So, So Long"	Lisa Palas, Alan Taylor	3:40
2.	"Sunday Kind of Love"	Barbara Belle, Anita Leonard, Louis Prima, Stan Rhodes	3:00
3.	"New Fool at an Old Game"	Steve Bogard, Rick Giles, Sheila Stephen	3:49
4.	"You're the One I Dream About"	Pamela Brown, Teresa Jackson	3:38
5.	"Silly Me"	Ben Weisman, Roberts Etoll	4:14
6.	"Respect"	Otis Redding	2:39
7.	"Do Right by Me"	Bogard, Giles	3:37
8.	"I Know How He Feels"	Rick Bowles, Will Robinson	3:20
9.	"Wish I Were Only Lonely"	Bogard, Giles	3:56
10.	"Everytime You Touch Her"	Pam Rose, Pat Bunch, Mary Ann Kennedy	3:52

== Personnel ==
- Reba McEntire – vocals
- John Barlow Jarvis – acoustic piano, Yamaha DX7
- Mike Lawler – synthesizers
- Pat Flynn – acoustic guitar, mandolin, bouzouki
- Pam Rose – acoustic guitar, harmony vocals
- Dann Huff – electric guitars
- Wayne Nelson – bass
- Russ Kunkel – drums, percussion
- Kirk "Jelly Roll" Johnson – harmonica
- Yvonne Hodges – harmony vocals
- Suzy Hoskins – harmony vocals
- Mary Ann Kennedy – harmony vocals

=== Production ===
- Jimmy Bowen – producer
- Reba McEntire – producer, make-up
- Ron Treat – recording engineer
- Bob Bullock – overdub recording
- Tim Kish – overdub recording
- Willie Pevear – overdub recording
- John Guess – mixing
- Mark J. Coddington – second engineer
- Marty Williams – second engineer
- Milan Bogdan – digital editing
- Glenn Meadows – mastering
- Masterfonics (Nashville, Tennessee) – mixing and mastering location
- Jessie Noble – project coordinator
- Simon Levy – art direction
- Katherine DeVault – design
- Jim "Señior" McGuire – photography
- Linda McMith – hair
- Sheri McCoy – wardrobe
- Ann Payne-Rice – wardrobe

== Charts ==
=== Weekly charts ===
Chart (1988)	Peak position
US Billboard 200	118
US Top Country Albums (Billboard)	1

=== Year-end charts ===
Chart (1988)	Position
US Top Country Albums (Billboard)	13

=== Singles ===
Year	Song	Chart positions	
Year	Song	US Country	CAN Country
1988	"Sunday Kind of Love"	5	9
1988	"I Know How He Feels"	1	1
1988	"New Fool At An Old Game"	1	1

== Certifications ==
Region	Certification	Certified units/sales
United States (RIAA)	Platinum	1,000,000^{^}
^{^} Shipments figures based on certification alone.
