= A Guy Called Athol =

Australian variety television show (1968)

A Guy Called Athol is an Australian variety television show broadcast by Channel 7 in 1968. It was hosted by Athol Guy and had a run of seventeen shows. Produced in Melbourne, it debuted on 28 August and featured supporting acts Bill and Boyd, Terry Norris, Pat Carroll, Kim Parry, Joe Lantana Dancers and an orchestra. It was a mixture of music, comedy and discussions. After a slow start to the series scriptwriters Eric Green and John Muir were brought in from England to improve the show. Channel 7 planned to follow it up with a Sydney produced The Athol Guy Show but dropped the series after the pilot.
