= Santa Never Made It into Darwin =

1975 single by Bill and Boyd

Single by Bill and Boyd

from the album Bill and Boyd
- Released: January 1975
- Studio: Armstrong Audio/Video (Melbourne, Australia)
- Length: 5:54
- Label: Fable
- Songwriter: William Cate
- Producer: Doug Trevor

Bill and Boyd singles chronology
"Aussie" (1974)	"Santa Never Made It into Darwin" (1975)	"Union Silver" (1975)

"Santa Never Made It into Darwin" is a charity single recorded by Bill and Boyd. It was written by the band's William Cate. Funds raised supported the Australian city of Darwin, Northern Territory, following the damage wrought by Cyclone Tracy on Christmas Eve and Christmas Day, 1974. The song peaked at number 2 on the Australian Kent Music Report. At the 1975 Australian Record Awards it won Song of the Year. It also won APRA Song of the Year at the 1976 Country Music Awards of Australia.

== Background ==
Bill and Boyd formed in Wellington, New Zealand as a pop and country music duo in 1959 by William "Bill" Cate and William Boyd Robertson. They relocated to Sydney in 1964. In 1970 they signed with independent label, Fable Records, which issued "Santa Never Made It to Darwin" in January 1975. Its proceeds supported the re-building of Northern Territory's capital city, Darwin after its devastation on the previous Christmas Eve and Christmas Day by Cyclone Tracy.

"Santa Never Made It into Darwin" was written by Cate and produced by Doug Trevor at Armstrong Audio and Video Studios in Melbourne. It peaked at number 2 on the Australian singles chart. At the 1975 Australian Record Awards it won Song of the Year. It also won APRA Song of the Year at the 1976 Country Music Awards of Australia.

== Track listing ==
7-inch vinyl single

A. "Santa Never Made It into Darwin" (William Cate) – 5:54
B. "Chulu Chululu" (Cate, William Boyd Robertson) – 2:02

== Charts ==
=== Weekly charts ===
Chart (1975)	Peak position
Australia (Kent Music Report)	2

=== Year-end charts ===
Chart (1975)	Position
Australia (Kent Music Report)	48

== Certifications ==
Region	Certification	Certified units/sales
Australia (ARIA)	Gold	50,000
