= Do Right by Me =

Do Right By Me

Studio album by Michelle Wright
- Released: 1988
- Recorded: 1987
- Studio: Inception Sound Studios, Ontario, Canada
- Genre: Country
- Length: 37:01
- Label: Savannah
- Producer: Steve Bogard; Rick Giles

Michelle Wright chronology
Do Right By Me (1988)	Michelle Wright (1990)

Alternative cover
- Cover for the 2010 re-release.

Singles from Do Right by Me
- 1. "New Fool at an Old Game" Released: 1987; 2. "Rock Me Gently" Released: 1989; 3. "I Wish I Were Only Lonely" Released: 1989

Professional ratings
Review scores
Source	Rating
Allmusic	3/5 stars

Do Right By Me is the first studio album by the Canadian country music artist Michelle Wright. It was released in 1988 on Savannah Records. Three songs from the album, "Do Right By Me", "Wish I Were Only Lonely" and "New Fool At An Old Game", were later recorded by Reba McEntire on her 1988 album Reba. The album was re-released twice. Once in 1997 and again on August 24, 2010, with all original songs, plus Wright's 1987 duet with Terry Carisse, "None of the Feeling Is Gone" (2010 release)

== Track listing ==
All songs written by Steve Bogard, Rick Giles except where noted.

1. "The Rhythm of Romance" - 3:57
2. "Do Right By Me" - 4:05
3. "I Want to Count on You" - 3:30
4. "I Wish I Were Only Lonely" - 4:04
5. "A Good Man Is Hard To Find" (J.K. Gulley) - 2:36
6. "Rock Me Gently" (Andy Kim) - 3:31
7. "New Fool at an Old Game" - 3:32
8. "With a Love Like Yours" - 3:34
9. "I Don't Want to Wonder" - 4:06
10. "Reaching for the Stars" (Michelle Wright) - 4:00
11. "None of the Feeling Is Gone" (2010 re-issue only)
  - duet with Terry Carisse

== Chart performance ==
Chart (1989)	Peak position
Canadian RPM Country Albums	32
