= 'Til Love Comes Again =

"'Til love Comes Again"
- Cassette single cover art

Single by Reba

from the album Sweet Sixteen
- B-side: "You Must Really Love Me"
- Released: September 6, 1989
- Genre: Country
- Length: 3:38
- Label: MCA
- Songwriters: Ed Hill, Bob Regan
- Producers: Jimmy Bowen, Reba McEntire

Reba singles chronology
"Cathy's Clown" (1989)	"'Til love Comes Again" (1989)	"Little Girl" (1989)

"'Til Love Comes Again" is a song recorded by American country music artist Reba McEntire. It was released in September 1989 as the second single from the album Sweet Sixteen. The song reached #4 on the Billboard Hot Country Singles & Tracks chart. The song was written by Ed Hill and Bob Regan.

== Chart performance ==
Chart (1989)	Peak position
Canada Country Singles (RPM)	5
US Hot Country Songs (Billboard)	4

=== Year-end charts ===
Chart (1989)	Position
Canada Country Tracks (RPM)	31
US Country Songs (Billboard)	61
