= Sweet Sixteen (Reba McEntire album) =

Studio album by Reba McEntire
- Released: May 1, 1989
- Studios: Emerald Sound Studios (Nashville, Tennessee)
- Genre: Country
- Length: 33:26
- Label: MCA
- Producers: Jimmy Bowen; Reba McEntire

Reba McEntire chronology
Reba (1988)	Sweet Sixteen (1989)	Reba Live (1989)

Singles from Sweet Sixteen
- 1. "Cathy's Clown" Released: April 1989; 2. "'Til Love Comes Again" Released: September 6, 1989; 3. "Little Girl" Released: December 1989; 4. "Walk On" Released: March 1990

Professional ratings
Review scores
Source	Rating
Allmusic	3.5/5 stars

Sweet Sixteen is the fifteenth studio album by American country music singer Reba McEntire, released on May 1, 1989 by MCA Records. Four singles from the album entered the Billboard country charts: the number one hit "Cathy's Clown" (a cover version of The Everly Brothers' song), top 5 hit "Walk On", and the top ten hits "'Til Love Comes Again" and "Little Girl". Sweet Sixteen was her penultimate album with record producer Jimmy Bowen. Reba Live would be her last.

The album's title derives from its being McEntire's sixteenth album, counting compilation and Christmas albums.

The album was certified Platinum by the RIAA, for selling over 1 million copies. The album debuted at #17 on the Country Albums chart for the week of May 27, 1989, and peaked at #1 for the week of June 24, 1989. It stayed at #1 for 13 consecutive weeks. The album sold over 500,000 copies in its first 9 weeks.

== Track listing ==
No.	Title	Writer(s)	Length
1.	"Cathy's Clown"	Don Everly	3:04
2.	"'Til Love Comes Again"	Bob Regan, Ed Hill	3:38
3.	"It Always Rains on Saturday"	Kendal Franceschi, Quentin Powers, Reba McEntire	4:26
4.	"Am I the Only One Who Cares"	Don Schlitz, McEntire	3:02
5.	"Somebody Up There Likes Me"	Suzi Hoskins-Wills, Bill Cooley	3:05
6.	"You Must Really Love Me"	Schlitz, McEntire	3:05
7.	"Say the Word"	Tom Shapiro, Chris Waters, Michael Garvin	2:46
8.	"Little Girl"	Franceschi, Powers	3:23
9.	"Walk On"	Steve Dean, Lonnie Williams	3:16
10.	"A New Love"	Dave Loggins	3:24

== Personnel ==
Adapted from the album liner notes.

- Reba McEntire – vocals, harmony vocals
- Bill Payne – acoustic piano
- Mike Lawler – synthesizers
- Brent Rowan – electric guitar
- Michael Thomas – electric guitar
- Billy Joe Walker Jr. – electric guitar, acoustic guitars
- Jerry Douglas – dobro
- Donnie LaValley – steel guitar, lap steel guitar
- Glen Duncan – fiddle, mandolin
- Leland Sklar – bass
- Eddie Bayers – drums
- Russ Kunkel – drums
- Kirk Cappello – cabasa
- Joe McGlohon – saxophone
- Vince Gill – harmony vocals
- Suzy Hoskins-Wills – harmony vocals
- Dave Loggins – harmony vocals
- Patty Loveless – harmony vocals
- Judy Rodman – harmony vocals
- Steve Wariner – harmony vocals

=== Production ===
- Jimmy Bowen – producer
- Reba McEntire – producer, pre-production, liner notes, make-up
- Don Lanier – pre-production
- Bob Bullock – recording engineer, overdub recording
- Tim Kish – overdub recording
- John Guess – mixing
- John S. Howell – second engineer
- Marty Williams – second engineer
- Milan Bogdan – digital editing
- Glenn Meadows – mastering at Masterfonics (Nashville, Tennessee)
- Jessie Noble – project coordinator
- Kirk Cappello – musical arranger
- Simon Levy – art direction
- Mickey Braithwaite – design
- Jim "Señor" McGuire – photography
- Linda McMith – hair, make-up
- Sheri McCoy – wardrobe
- Ann Payne-Rice – wardrobe

== Charts ==
=== Weekly charts ===
Chart (1989)	Peak position
Canadian Country Albums (RPM)	1
US Billboard 200	78
US Top Country Albums (Billboard)	1

=== Year-end charts ===
Chart (1989)	Position
US Top Country Albums (Billboard)	15
Chart (1990)	Position
US Top Country Albums (Billboard)	55

=== Singles ===
Year	Song	Chart positions	
Year	Song	US Country	CAN Country
1989	"Cathy's Clown"	1	1
1989	"Til' Love Comes Again"	4	5
1989	"Little Girl"	7	7
1990	"Walk On"	2	1

== Certifications and sales ==
Region	Certification	Certified units/sales
United States (RIAA)	Platinum	1,000,000^{^}
^{^} Shipments figures based on certification alone.
