= Walk On (Reba McEntire song) =

Single by Reba McEntire

from the album Sweet Sixteen
- B-side: "It Always Rains on Saturday"
- Released: March 1990
- Genre: Country
- Length: 3:16
- Label: MCA 79009
- Songwriters: Steve Dean; Lonnie Williams
- Producers: Jimmy Bowen; Reba McEntire

Reba McEntire singles chronology
"Oklahoma Swing" (1990)	"Walk On" (1990)	"You Lie" (1990)

"Walk On" is a song written by Steve Dean and Lonnie Williams, and recorded by American country music artist Reba McEntire. It was released in March 1990 as the fourth and final single from her album Sweet Sixteen. The song reached #2 on the Billboard Hot Country Singles & Tracks chart in June 1990.

== Chart performance ==
Chart (1990)	Peak position
Canada Country Singles (RPM)	1
US Hot Country Songs (Billboard)	2

=== Year-end charts ===
Chart (1990)	Position
Canada Country Tracks (RPM)	50
US Country Songs (Billboard)	31
