= Cathy's Clown =

1960 single by the Everly Brothers

Single by the Everly Brothers

from the album A Date with the Everly Brothers
- B-side: "Always It's You"
- Released: April 1960
- Recorded: 1960
- Genre: Pop
- Length: 2:22
- Label: Warner Bros.
- Songwriter: Don Everly
- Producer: Wesley Rose

The Everly Brothers singles chronology
"Let It Be Me" (1960)	"Cathy's Clown" (1960)	"When Will I Be Loved" (1960)

"Cathy's Clown" is a popular song, written by Don Everly and recorded by The Everly Brothers in 1960. The lyrics describe a man who has been wronged and publicly humiliated by his lover: "Here he comes / That's Cathy's clown". The choruses are sung by brothers Don and Phil in their trademark close harmony style, while Don sings the bridges solo.

"Cathy's Clown" is noted for its unorthodox structure, such as beginning on a chorus and having bridges but no verses. The song was a worldwide success and the best-selling single of the Everly Brothers' career. Because of its enduring influence on popular music, the song was added to the National Recording Registry of the Library of Congress in 2013.

== Recording ==
The musicians included the Everlys and Hank Garland on guitars, Floyd Cramer on piano, Floyd Chance on bass and Buddy Harman on drums. The distinctive drum sound was achieved by recording them with a tape loop, making it sound as if there were two drummers. "Cathy's Clown" was recorded live in a single take, with Don and Phil sharing a microphone.

== History ==
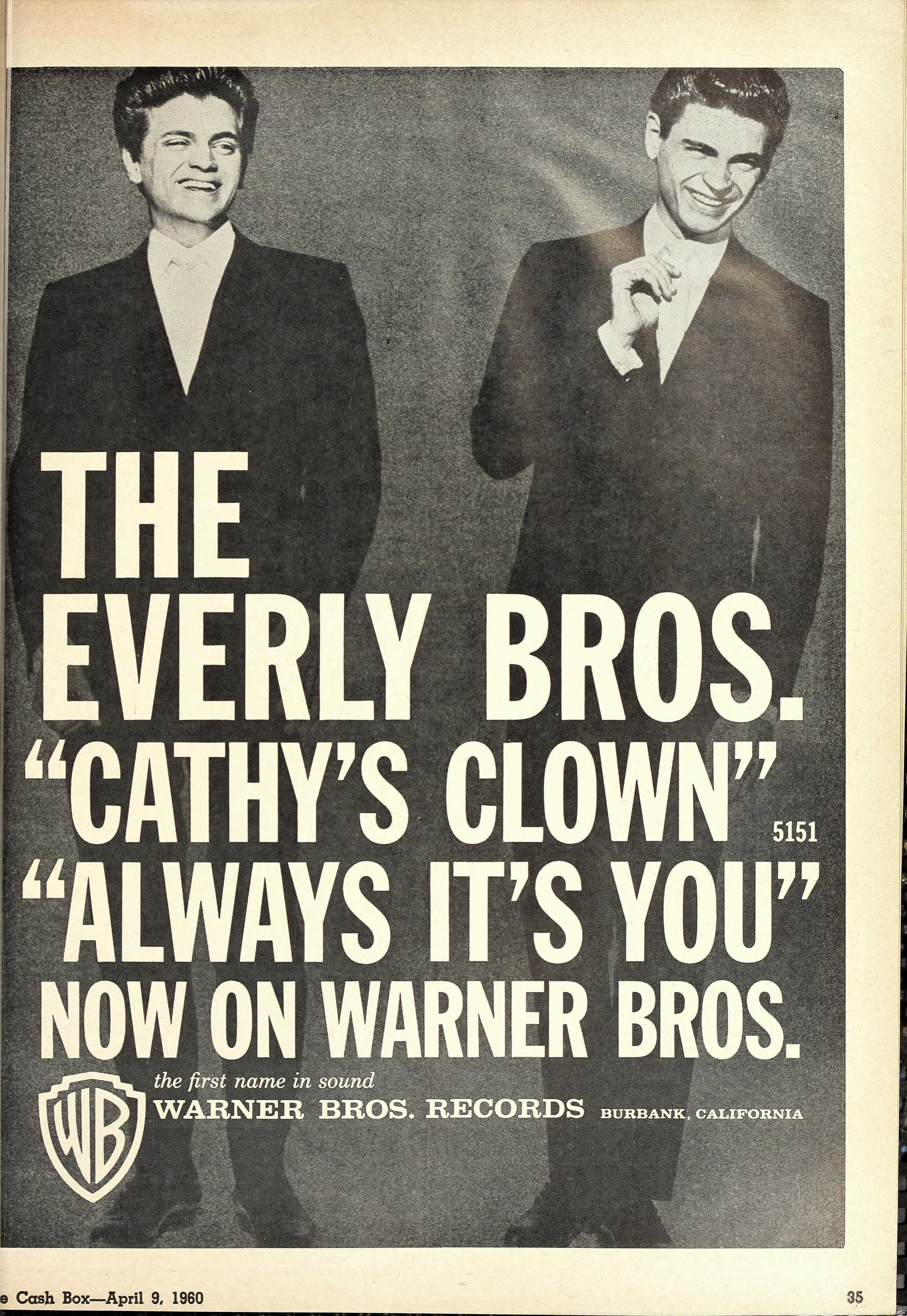
Cashbox advertisement, April 9, 1960

"Cathy's Clown" was The Everly Brothers' first single for Warner Bros., having previously recorded for Archie Bleyer's Cadence label for three years. It sold eight million copies worldwide, spending five weeks at number 1 on the U.S. Billboard Hot 100 chart and one week on the R&B chart. The song spent seven weeks at number 1 on the UK Singles Chart in May and June 1960, and was the Everly Brothers' biggest-selling single and their third and final U.S. number 1 hit. Billboard ranked it as the number 3 song of the year for 1960.

In 2004, it was ranked 149th on Rolling Stone magazine's list of the 500 Greatest Songs of All Time.

In November 2018, a judge ruled that Don was the sole writer of "Cathy's Clown", as Phil had relinquished his rights sometime before June 1980. Acuff-Rose Music, which owned the song publishing, and BMI (the brothers' rights society) removed Phil's name from all the royalty statements. In 2011, Don filed to regain ownership, with the estate of Phil following in 2014.

== Associations ==
"Cathy's Clown" was inspired by Ferde Grofé's Grand Canyon Suite. It was a major influence on the Beatles, who—having "once toyed with calling themselves The Foreverly Brothers"—three years later copied the Everly's harmonies on their first U.K. No. 1 hit single, "Please Please Me".

"Cathy's Clown" is mentioned in the opening line of Elliott Smith's song "Waltz 2 (XO)", the title track of his 1998 album XO.

Jan and Dean recorded a cover of "Cathy's Clown" for their album Filet of Soul, but Liberty Records rejected both track listings that included the song. Liberty later selected its own track listing, which did not include "Cathy's Clown", and released it shortly after Jan Berry's crash near Deadman's Curve. Jan & Dean's cover of "Cathy's Clown" is available on the "Filet Of Soul Redux: The Rejected Master Recordings" release.

== Charts ==
Chart (1960–1961)	Peak position
Italy (FIMI)	20
UK Singles Chart	1
US Billboard Hot 100	1
US Billboard Hot R&B Singles	1

== Reba McEntire version ==
"Cathy's Clown"

Single by Reba McEntire

from the album Sweet Sixteen
- Released: April 1989
- Genre: Country
- Length: 3:04
- Label: MCA
- Songwriter: Don Everly
- Producers: Jimmy Bowen, Reba McEntire

Reba McEntire singles chronology
"New Fool at an Old Game" (1988)	"Cathy's Clown" (1989)	"'Til Love Comes Again" (1989)

The song was recorded by American country music artist Reba McEntire in April 1989 as the lead single from her fifteenth studio album Sweet Sixteen. The song reached #1 on the Billboard Hot Country Singles & Tracks chart.

=== Charts ===
Chart (1989)	Peak position
Canada Country Singles (RPM)	1
US Hot Country Songs (Billboard)	1

=== Year-end charts ===
Chart (1989)	Position
Canada Country Tracks (RPM)	11
US Country Songs (Billboard)	15

== Johnny Hallyday version (in French) ==
"Le p'tit clown de ton cœur"

Single by Johnny Hallyday

from the album Nous les gars, nous les filles
- Language: French
- English title: The Little Clown of your heart
- B-side: "Oui j'ai"
- Released: November 24, 1960
- Recorded: October 1960
- Genre: Rock and roll
- Length: 2:26
- Label: Disques Vogue
- Songwriters: Don Everly, Georges Aber, Pierre Delanoë

Johnny Hallyday singles chronology
"Itsy bitsy petit bikini" (1960)	"Le p'tit clown de ton cœur" (1960)	"Kili watch" (1960)

Also in 1960, the song was adapted into French by Georges Aber and Pierre Delanoë as "Le p'tit clown de ton cœur" (meaning "The Little Clown of your heart"), and was recorded by French rock and roll singer Johnny Hallyday and was released as the lead single off of Hallyday's second studio album Nous les gars, nous les filles ("Us guys, us girls") that November, which was released two months later. Hallyday's version peaked at Number 48 on the French Belgian charts in early 1961.

=== Charts ===
Chart (1961)	Peak position
Belgium (Ultratop 50 Wallonia)	48

== Other notable versions ==
The song was covered by Bill and Boyd in New Zealand; their version reached number 1 on the Lever Hit Parades chart in that country in July 1960. Another cover, by the English singer Dick Jordon, reached number 5 in New Zealand. English musician John Lennon recorded a piano version, though only as a short demo that was never finished. Neil Sedaka recorded a cover version for his 1983 album Come See About Me.
