= Bill and Boyd =

Pop music duo consisting of William Cate and William Robertson

- Origin: Wellington, North Island, New Zealand
- Genres: Pop
- Years active: 1959–1989
- Labels: Stetson, Peak, Philips, Sunshine, Fable, EMI M7
- Past members: William "Bill" Cate; William "Boyd" Robertson

Bill and Boyd were a pop music duo from 1959 to 1989 consisting of William "Bill" Cate (10 October 1940 - 29 November 2020) and William "Boyd" Robertson (born 1941), both on lead vocals and lead guitar, which started recording in 1960. They began their careers in Wellington, New Zealand before relocating to Sydney by 1964. In 1968 they toured United States supporting The Supremes and Herb Alpert.

Bill and Boyd's highest-charting single, "Santa Never Made It into Darwin", peaked at No. 2 on the Australian Kent Music Report Singles Chart in early 1975. It was a charity single in support of rebuilding Darwin after its devastation by Cyclone Tracy on the previous Christmas Eve – Christmas Day. At the Country Music Awards of Australia of 1976 "Santa Never Made It into Darwin" won the APRA Song of the Year for the duo and Cate its writer. Their self-titled album from 1975 reached No. 1 on the New Zealand Albums Chart, while "Put Another Log on the Fire" reached No. 5 on the related New Zealand Singles Chart and No. 23 in Australia. The duo continued together until 1989. Cate formed a self-titled trio.

== History ==
William "Bill" Cate (1940–2020) and William "Boyd" Robertson (born 1941) both attended Naenae College, a secondary school in Lower Hutt, in the mid-1950s. They started practising pop music in Robertson's bedroom and recorded a home version of "Angel" in about 1956. They formed a duo, Bill and Boyd, with both on lead vocals and lead guitar. They began public performances at local halls including a residency at Lower Hutt's Town Hall. Their early repertoire was cover versions of overseas artists, especially The Everly Brothers and Elvis Presley. In 1959 they supported local rock and roller, Johnny Devlin, in Wellington.

By 1960 they had signed with Peak Records label, and issued five singles over the following year including "Fall in Love with You" and their cover of "Corrina, Corrina". Late in 1961 they switched labels to Philips Records and two years later relocated to Auckland. During 1963 they toured with Peter Posa, Max Merritt and Dinah Lee. By 1964 they had relocated to Sydney with the release of their single, "Chulu Chululu", receiving attention in Australia. The track was co-written by Cate and Robertson. In the early sixties they had three hit singles on the Lever Hit Parade, the biggest, a cover of the Everly Brothers hit "Cathy's Clown" which went to number one in 1960.

Through the late 1960s they released further singles, extended plays and albums, gained popularity, toured the club circuit and regularly appeared on national TV shows, Bandstand and Six O'Clock Rock. During February 1966 they supported an Australian tour by folk-pop group, The Seekers. The Canberra Times' Garry Raffaele caught their performance in Canberra and felt the duo were "more suited to night-club work although they were very well received by last night's audience. Their boy-next-door image even allowed Boyd to get away with a couple of slightly queer jokes". In September 1967 Bill and Boyd's version of the Fiddler on the Roof track "If I Were a Rich Man" was issued on Sunshine Records and peaked at No. 24 on the Go-Set National Top 40. In 1968 they toured United States supporting The Supremes and Herb Alpert. That same year they were featured regulars on A Guy Called Athol.

By 1970 they had signed with independent label, Fable Records, which released Bill and Boyd's version of "It's a Small World". On Christmas Eve and Christmas Day 1974 Cyclone Tracy devastated the Northern Territory capital, Darwin. Cate wrote "Santa Never Made It into Darwin", which was released as a charity single in January the following year by Bill and Boyd to support the city's rebuilding. It peaked at No. 2 on the Australian Kent Music Report Singles Chart. and sold 50,000 copies in eight weeks. At the Country Music Awards of Australia of 1976 "Santa Never Made It into Darwin" won APRA Song of the Year for the duo and Cate its writer.

A follow-up single, "Put Another Log on the Fire", was a cover version of Tompall Glaser's hit from the same year. Bill and Boyd's version reached No. 5 on the New Zealand Singles Chart, and No. 23 in Australia. The duo's self-titled album was issued in December 1975 and peaked at No. 1 on the New Zealand Albums Chart.

In June 1976 visiting US artist, Glen Campbell, hosted Down Home, Down Under on Nine Network with guests including the duo alongside Olivia Newton-John, John Meillon and Sherbet. Bill and Boyd continued performing on the club circuit until 1989. In 2003 Bruce Ward curated a CD compilation album, The Very Best of Bill and Boyd which was issued by EMI Music New Zealand.

== Discography ==
=== Albums ===
Title	Album details	Peak chart positions	
Title	Album details	NZL	AUS
Swingin' Together	Released: 1962; Label: Philips Records (P 08756)	-	-
Songs for a Cloudy Summer Afternoon	Released: 1964; Label: Philips Records (P 08759)	-	-
Interfusion Talent Plus	Released: 1967; Label: Sunshine Records (SQL-932604)	-	-
Bill and Boyd	Released: March 1975; Label: Fable Records (FBSA-049)	1	83
Companions	Released: 1979; Label: Elektra (600041)	-	-

=== Compilation albums ===
Title	Album details	Peak chart positions	Certification
Title	Album details	AUS	Certification
Dreamin': 18 All Time Greats	Released: March 1982; Label: J & B Records (JB101)	41	AUS: Gold
The Very Best of Bill and Boyd	Released: 2003; Label: EMI Music (5830442)	-	

=== Extended plays ===
Title	EP details	Peak chart positions
Title	EP details	AUS
Chulu Chululu	Released: 1964; Label: Philips (PE25)	
If I Were a Rich Man	Released: 1967; Label: Sunshine Records (QX-11,325)	

=== Charting singles ===
Year	Single	Chart positions		Certification
Year	Single	AUS	NZ	Certification
1960	"Cathy's Clown"		1	
1961	"Surrender My Love"		7	
1962	"Double Trouble"		8	
1967	"If I Were a Rich Man"	24		
1970	"It's a Small World"	51		
1975	"Santa Never Made It into Darwin"	2		AUS: Gold
1975	"Union Silver"	98		
1975	"Put Another Log on the Fire"	23	5	
1976	"Questions"	84		

== Awards ==
=== Australian Record Awards ===
Year	Nominee / work	Award	Result
1975	"Santa Never Made It into Darwin"	Song of the Year	Won

=== Country Music Awards of Australia ===
The Country Music Awards of Australia (CMAA) (also known as the Golden Guitar Awards) is an annual awards night held in January during the Tamworth Country Music Festival, celebrating recording excellence in the Australian country music industry. They have been held annually since 1973.

Year	Nominee / work	Award	Result
1976	"Santa Never Made It into Darwin"	APRA Song of the Year	Won

=== Mo Awards ===
The Australian Entertainment Mo Awards (commonly known informally as the Mo Awards), were annual Australian entertainment industry awards. They recognise achievements in live entertainment in Australia from 1975 to 2016. Bill and Boyd won 9 awards in that time.

Year	Nominee / work	Award	Result (wins only)
1975	Bill and Boyd	Vocal Duo of the Year	Won
1976	Bill and Boyd	Vocal Duo of the Year	Won
1977	Bill and Boyd	Vocal Duo of the Year	Won
1980	Bill and Boyd	Vocal Duo of the Year	Won
1981	Bill and Boyd	Vocal Duo of the Year	Won
1982	Bill and Boyd	Vocal Duo of the Year	Won
1983	Bill and Boyd	Vocal Duo of the Year	Won
1984	Bill and Boyd	Vocal Duo of the Year	Won
1991	Bill and Boyd	1&2 Man Band of the Year	Won
