= New Fool at an Old Game =

Single by Michelle Wright

from the album Do Right by Me
- Released: 1987
- Recorded: 1987
- Genre: Country
- Length: 3:32
- Label: Savannah
- Songwriters: Steve Bogard; Rick Giles; Sheila Stephen
- Producers: Steve Bogard; Rick Giles

Michelle Wright singles chronology
"I Want to Count on You" (1986)	"New Fool at an Old Game" (1987)	"The Rhythm of Romance" (1988)

"New Fool at an Old Game"

Single by Reba McEntire

from the album Reba
- B-side: "You're the One I Dream About"
- Released: December 1988
- Recorded: 1988
- Genre: Country
- Length: 3:49
- Label: MCA
- Songwriters: Steve Bogard; Rick Giles; Sheila Stephen
- Producers: Jimmy Bowen; Reba McEntire

Reba McEntire singles chronology
"I Know How He Feels" (1988)	"New Fool at an Old Game" (1988)	"Cathy's Clown" (1989)

"New Fool at an Old Game" is a song first recorded by Canadian country music artist Michelle Wright. Wright's version was released in 1987 on Savannah Records as the second single from her 1988 album Do Right by Me and peaked at number 11 on RPM Country Tracks chart in Canada. American Country Music Hall of Fame artist Reba McEntire released her version in December 1988 as the third single from her album Reba. It was her twelfth number one on the country chart. The single went to number one for one week and spent a total of fourteen weeks on the country chart. The song was written by Steve Bogard, Rick Giles, and Sheila Stephen.

== Chart performance ==
=== Michelle Wright ===
Chart (1987)	Peak position
Canadian RPM Country Tracks	11
Canadian RPM Adult Contemporary Tracks	21

=== Reba McEntire ===
Chart (1988–1989)	Peak position
US Hot Country Songs (Billboard)	1
Canadian RPM Country Tracks	1

==== Year-end charts ====
Chart (1989)	Position
Canada Country Tracks (RPM)	61
US Country Songs (Billboard)	36
