= I Know How He Feels =

Single by Reba McEntire

from the album Reba
- B-side: "So So So Long"
- Released: August 1988
- Genre: Country pop
- Length: 3:20
- Label: MCA
- Songwriter(s): Rick Bowles; Will Robinson
- Producer(s): Jimmy Bowen; Reba McEntire

Reba McEntire singles chronology
"Sunday Kind of Love" (1988)	"I Know How He Feels" (1988)	"New Fool at an Old Game" (1988)

"I Know How He Feels" is a song written by Rick Bowles and Will Robinson and recorded by American country music artist Reba McEntire. It was released in August 1988 as the second single from the album Reba. The song was McEntire's eleventh number one country hit. The single went to number-one for one week and spent fourteen weeks on the country chart.

== Charts ==
=== Weekly charts ===
Chart (1988)	Peak position
US Hot Country Songs (Billboard)	1
Canadian RPM Country Tracks	1

=== Year-end charts ===
Chart (1988)	Position
US Hot Country Songs (Billboard)	90
