= Cyclone Apollo =

Mediterranean tropical-like cyclone in 2021

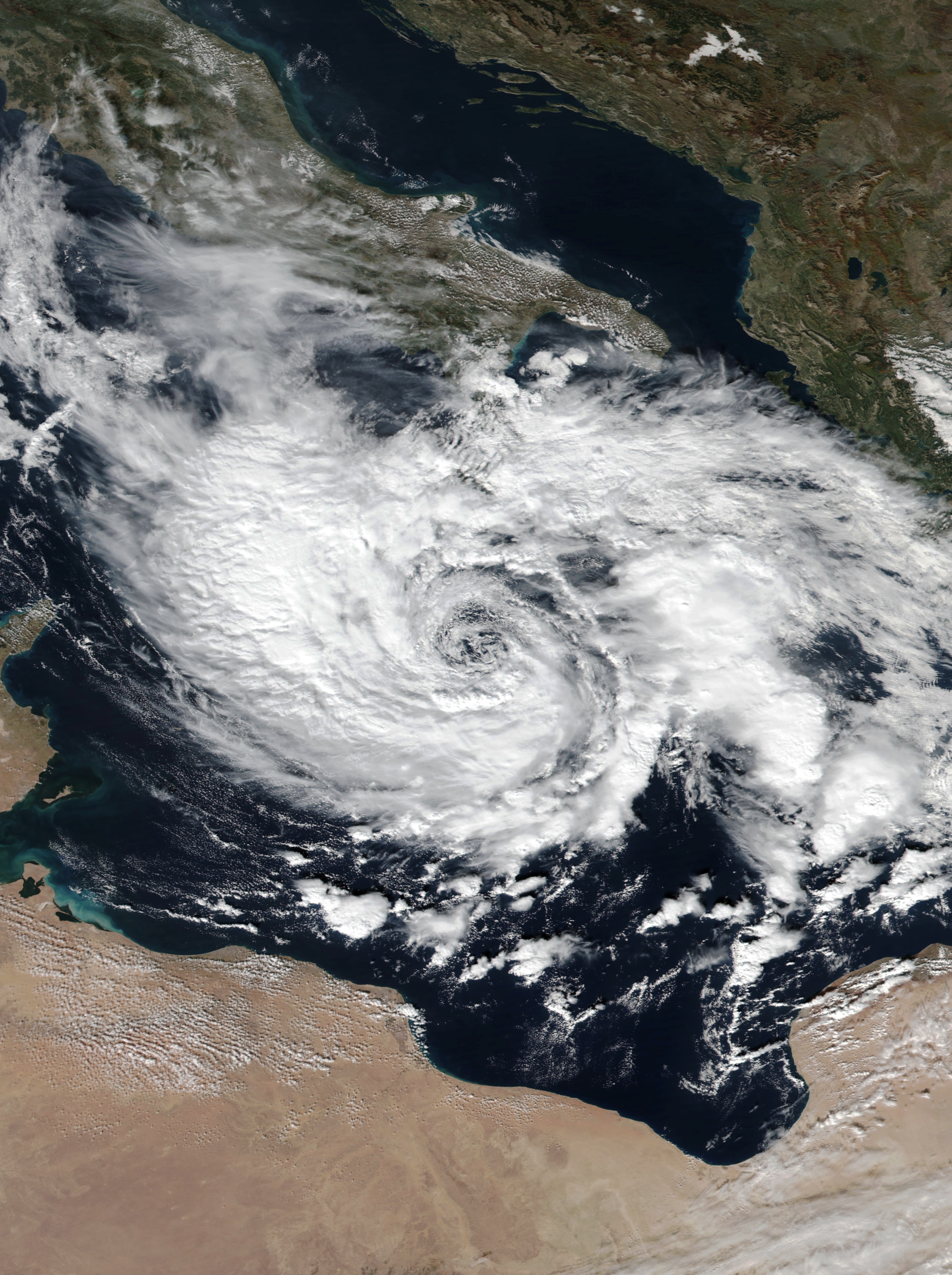
- Cyclone Apollo at peak intensity on 29 October off the eastern coast of Sicily

Meteorological history
- Formed: 24 October 2021
- Dissipated: 2 November 2021

Tropical storm
- Highest winds: 100 km/h (65 mph)
- Lowest pressure: 999 hPa (mbar); 29.50 inHg

Overall effects
- Fatalities: 7
- Damage: >$245 million (2021 USD)
- Areas affected: Algeria, Tunisia, Italy (especially Sicily), Malta, Libya, Cyprus, Turkey
- Part of the 2021–22 European windstorm season

Cyclone Apollo, also known as Medicane Nearchus, was a powerful Mediterranean tropical-like cyclone that affected many countries on the Mediterranean coast, especially Italy, in 2021. The storm killed 7 people total, due to flooding from the cyclone, in the countries of Tunisia, Algeria, Malta, and Italy, where the worst of the effects have been felt, especially on the island of Sicily. Damage estimates by the Aon Benfield were set at more than $245 million.

== Meteorological history ==
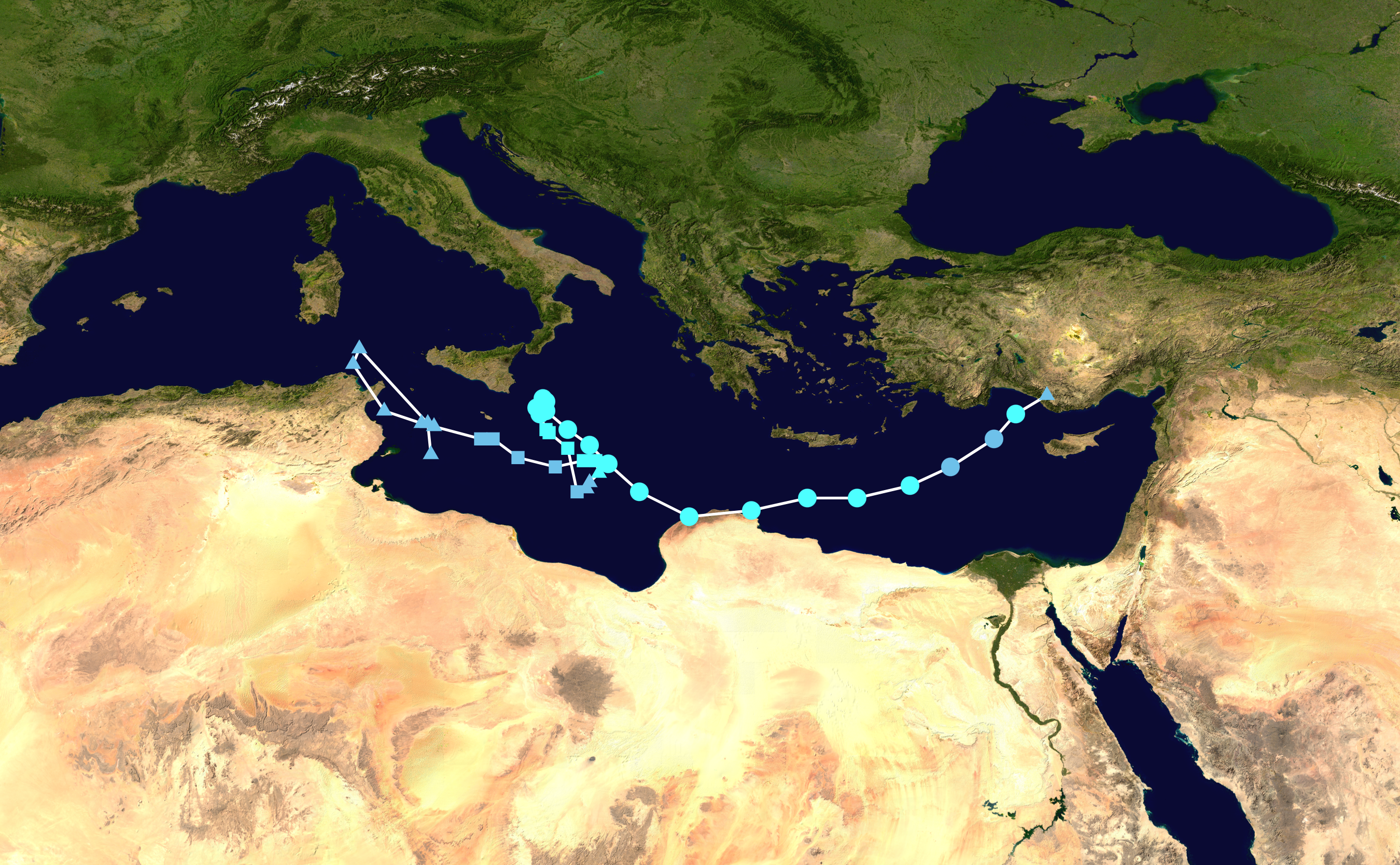
Map plotting the storm's track and intensity, according to the Saffir–Simpson scale Map key Saffir–Simpson scale Tropical depression (≤38 mph, ≤62 km/h) Tropical storm (39–73 mph, 63–118 km/h) Category 1 (74–95 mph, 119–153 km/h) Category 2 (96–110 mph, 154–177 km/h) Category 3 (111–129 mph, 178–208 km/h) Category 4 (130–156 mph, 209–251 km/h) Category 5 (≥157 mph, ≥252 km/h) Unknown Storm type Tropical cyclone Subtropical cyclone Extratropical cyclone, remnant low, tropical disturbance, or monsoon depression

Around 22 October 2021, an area of organized thunderstorms formed near the Balearic Islands, with the disturbance becoming more organized and developing an area of low pressure around 24 October. On the next day, the low started to develop a low-level circulation center, and moved into the Tyrrhenian Sea. On 28 October, the system organized even further and intensified, which prompted forecast offices in Europe to name the low. Italy's "Servizio Meteorologico" named the storm Apollo (which was then adopted by the Free University of Berlin), while Greece named the storm Nearchus. On 29 October 2021, a ship in the Mediterranean Sea passed through Apollo and measured a peak wind speed of 104 km/h (65 mph) and a pressure of 999.4 mb (29.51 inHg), indicating that Apollo was still strengthening. After Apollo made its closest approach to Sicily during the overnight hours of 29 October, Apollo appeared to have begun to weaken as its convection waned and its low-level circulation became exposed on visible satellite imagery on 30 October 2021. On 31 October 2021, Apollo made landfall near Bayda and stayed inland until emerging over the Mediterranean a few hours later. On 2 November 2021, Apollo dissipated inland over Turkey.

== Preparations and impact ==
Heavy rain from the cyclone and its precursor caused heavy rainfall and flooding in Tunisia, Algeria, Southern Italy, and Malta, killing 7 people total. The flooding was especially severe in the provinces of Catania and Siracusa, in Eastern Sicily.

== Aftermath and naming ==
Some names for the cyclone include the most commonly used one, Apollo, which was used by Italy, which used it from its naming list for the 2021-22 windstorm season, and was also used by the Free University of Berlin. The agency Meteo Greece named the system Nearchus, after the voyager of the same name.

== See also ==
- Mediterranean tropical-like cyclone
- Tropical cyclones in 2021
- Tropical cyclones and climate change
- Cyclone Ianos – A powerful Medicane which effected similar areas a year prior
- Cyclone Zorbas – Another powerful medicane which also developed in the same region in 2018
