= Little Girl (Reba McEntire song) =

1989 single by Reba McEntire

- Cassette single cover art

Single by Reba

from the album Sweet Sixteen
- B-side: "Am I the Only One Who Cares"
- Released: December 1989
- Recorded: January 1989
- Genre: Country
- Length: 3:27
- Label: MCA 53763
- Songwriters: Kendal Franceschi, Quentin Powers
- Producers: Jimmy Bowen, Reba McEntire

Reba singles chronology
"'Til Love Comes Again" (1989)	"Little Girl" (1989)	"Oklahoma Swing" (1990)

"Little Girl" is a song written by Kendal Franceschi and Quentin Powers, and recorded by American country music artist Reba McEntire. It was released in December 1989 as the third single from the album Sweet Sixteen. The song reached number 7 on the Billboard Hot Country Singles & Tracks chart.

== Chart performance ==
Chart (1989–1990)	Peak position
Canada Country Singles (RPM)	6
US Hot Country Songs (Billboard)	7

=== Year-end charts ===
Chart (1990)	Position
Canada Country Tracks (RPM)	87
US Country Songs (Billboard)	58
