= Destiny (disambiguation) =

Destiny is a predetermined course of events or fixed natural order of the universe.

Destiny may also refer to:

== People ==
- Destiny (given name), with a list of people so called
- Destiny (streamer) (born 1988), American live streamer and political commentator
- Destiny (singer) (born 2002), Maltese singer

== Arts and entertainment ==
=== Fiction ===
- Destiny (wordless novel), 1926, by Otto Nückel
- Destiny (Don Brown novel), a 2014 historical fiction novel written by Don Brown
- Destiny, a 1916 novel by Charles Neville Buck
- Destiny, a 2007 Dragonlance novel by Paul B. Thompson and Tonya C. Cook
- Star Trek: Destiny, a Star Trek crossover trilogy authored by David Alan Mack

=== Comics ===
==== DC Comics ====
- Doctor Destiny
  - Destiny: A Chronicle of Deaths Foretold, a 1996 miniseries published by Vertigo
- JLA: Destiny, a 2002 miniseries

==== Marvel Comics ====
- Destiny (Irene Adler), a supporting character of the X-Men
- Destiny (Marvel Comics personification), the personification of fate
- Destiny (Paul Destine), a possessor of the Serpent Crown
- The Destiny Force, a powerful energy harnessed by Rick Jones, among others

=== Film ===
- Destiny (1915 film), an American silent drama
- Destiny (1919 film), based on the novel by Charles Neville Buck
- Destiny (1921 film), a silent film directed in Germany by Fritz Lang
- Destiny (1925 film), a German silent drama directed by Felix Basch
- Destiny (1927 film), a French silent film directed by Dimitri Kirsanoff
- Destiny (1938 film), a drama directed by Mario Mattoli
- Destiny (1942 film), an Austrian-German historical drama directed by Géza von Bolváry
- Destiny (1946 film), a French film directed by Richard Pottier
- Destiny (1944 film), an American drama noir directed by Reginald Le Borg
- Destiny (1951 film), an Italian drama directed by Enzo Di Gianni
- Destiny (1977 film), directed by Yevgeny Matveyev
- Destiny (1997 film), a French-Egyptian historical drama directed by Youssef Chahine
- Destiny (2006 film), a Turkish drama directed by Zeki Demirkubuz
- The Destiny, a 2010 Bhutanese Dzongkha language film
- Destiny (2018 film), an Indian romantic drama comedy short film

=== Television ===
- Destiny (Singaporean TV series), 2005
- Destiny, a 2024 Japanese TV series starring Satomi Ishihara
- Mobile Suit Gundam SEED Destiny, a 2007 anime television series
- Destiny Evans, a fictional character from the American soap opera One Life to Live
- Destiny, a main character on the television series Mongrels

=== Episodes ===
- "Destiny" (The Acolyte), an episode of The Acolyte
- "Destiny" (Adventure Time: Fionna and Cake), a 2023 episode of the TV series Adventure Time: Fionna and Cake
- "Destiny" (Angel), a 2003 episode of the TV series Angel
- "Destiny" (Legends of Tomorrow), an episode of the TV series Legends of Tomorrow
- "Destiny" (Queen of Swords), first episode of the 2000 TV series Queen of Swords
- "Destiny" (Runaways), an episode of Runaways
- "Destiny" (Star Trek: Deep Space Nine), a 1995 episode of the TV series Star Trek: Deep Space Nine
- "Destiny" (Star Wars: The Clone Wars)

=== Games ===
- Destiny: World Domination from Stone Age to Space Age, 1996 4X video game developed and published by Interactive Magic
- Destiny (video game series), a science fantasy video game series created by Bungie
  - Destiny (video game), the first title in the Destiny video game series
- Destiny (play-by-mail game)

=== Music ===
==== Albums ====
- Destiny (Barrio Boyzz album), 2000
- Destiny (Beckah Shae album), 2011
- Celtic Woman: Destiny, 2015
- Destiny (Chaka Khan album), 1986
- Destiny (DJ Sabrina the Teenage DJ album), 2023
- Destiny (Gloria Estefan album), 1996
- Destiny (The Jacksons album), 1978
- Destiny (Jolina Magdangal album), 2008
- Destiny (Marilyn Crispell album), 1995
- Destiny?, 1998, by the Canadian progressive rock band Mystery
- Destiny (No Angels album), 2007
- Destiny (Saxon album), 1988
- Destiny (Shai album), 1999
- Destiny (Stratovarius album), 1998
- Destiny, 1999, by Jim Brickman
- Destiny, 2002 J-pop album by Miki Matsuhashi
- Destiny, 2023 reggae album by Alborosie

==== Songs ====
- "Destiny" (Jennifer Rush song), 1985
- "Destiny" (Dem 2 song), 1998
- "Destiny" (Jim Brickman song), 1999
- "Destiny" (Zero 7 song), 2001
- "Destiny" (Schiller song), 2008
- "Destiny" (Infinite song), 2013
- "Destiny" (Ellie Goulding song), 2025
- "Destiny", by the English electronic band Syntax
- "Destiny", 1976, by Candi Staton
- "Destiny", 1993, from the Death album Individual Thought Patterns
- "Destiny", 1997, from the Buju Banton album Inna Heights
- "Destiny", 2001, from the Heavenly album Sign of the Winner
- "Destiny", the title song of a 2001 single by Miki Matsuhashi
- "Destiny", 2002, from the Bulldog Mansion album Funk
- "Destiny", 2005, from the Metalium album Demons of Insanity – Chapter Five
- "Destiny", 2010, from the Galneryus album Resurrection
- "Destiny", 2012, from the Firewind album Few Against Many
- "Destiny", 2014, from the Ronnie Radke mixtape Watch Me
- "Destiny", 2015, from the Borealis album Purgatory
- "Destiny", 2017, from the NF album Perception
- "Destiny", 2022, from the Gavin DeGraw album Face the River
- "Destiny", by Take 6 from the compilation album The Prince of Egypt (Inspirational)
- "Destiny – Mann Atkeya", a 2026 film song by Shashwat Sachdev, Vaibhav Gupta, Shahzad Ali and Token from Dhurandhar: The Revenge

==== Other uses in music ====
- Destiny (Janáček), a 1907 opera in three acts by Leoš Janáček
- Destiny (band), a heavy metal/progressive metal band from Gothenburg, Sweden

== Other ==
- DESTINY+, a planned space mission to asteroid 3200 Phaethon
- Dark Energy Space Telescope (Destiny), a planned project by NASA and the U.S. Department of Energy, designed to perform precision measurements of the universe
- Destiny (Greek political party), a defunct political party in Greece
- Destiny (ISS module), the primary operating facility for U.S. research payloads aboard the International Space Station
- Destiny (magazine), a South African women's magazine
- Destiny Church (New Zealand), a Pentecostal fundamentalist Christian movement headquartered in Auckland, New Zealand
- Destiny Church Groningen, a neo-charismatic church denomination founded in Groningen, the Netherlands
- Destiny New Zealand (2003–2007), a Christian political party in New Zealand
- Carnival Destiny, a Destiny-class cruise ship owned and operated by Carnival Cruise Lines
- Destiny USA, a retail and entertainment complex in Syracuse, New York
- Destiny (horse) (1833–?), British Thoroughbred racehorse
- Destiny, Florida, an urban development project in Osceola County, Florida
- Destiny Cable, a cable TV company in the Philippines
- Univel Destiny, a desktop version of Unix later released as UnixWare 1.0 by an AT&T and Novell joint venture
- Manifest Destiny, the concept that drove American Westward expansion

== See also ==
- City of Destiny (disambiguation)
- My Destiny (disambiguation)
