= Warr Acres =

Warr Acres may refer to:

- Warr Acres, Oklahoma, a city in Oklahoma County, Oklahoma, United States
- Warr Acres (band) (formerly VMusic), an American band
- Warr Acres (album), an album from the band Warr Acres
- Warr Acres (Tulsa King), an episode of the American crime drama Tulsa King
