= Sending You a Little Christmas =

Sending You a Little Christmas may refer to:

- "Sending You a Little Christmas", a 2003 song by Jim Brickman from his album Peace.
- Sending You a Little Christmas (album), a 2013 album by Johnny Mathis
