= Kassie DePaiva =

American actress and singer (born 1961)

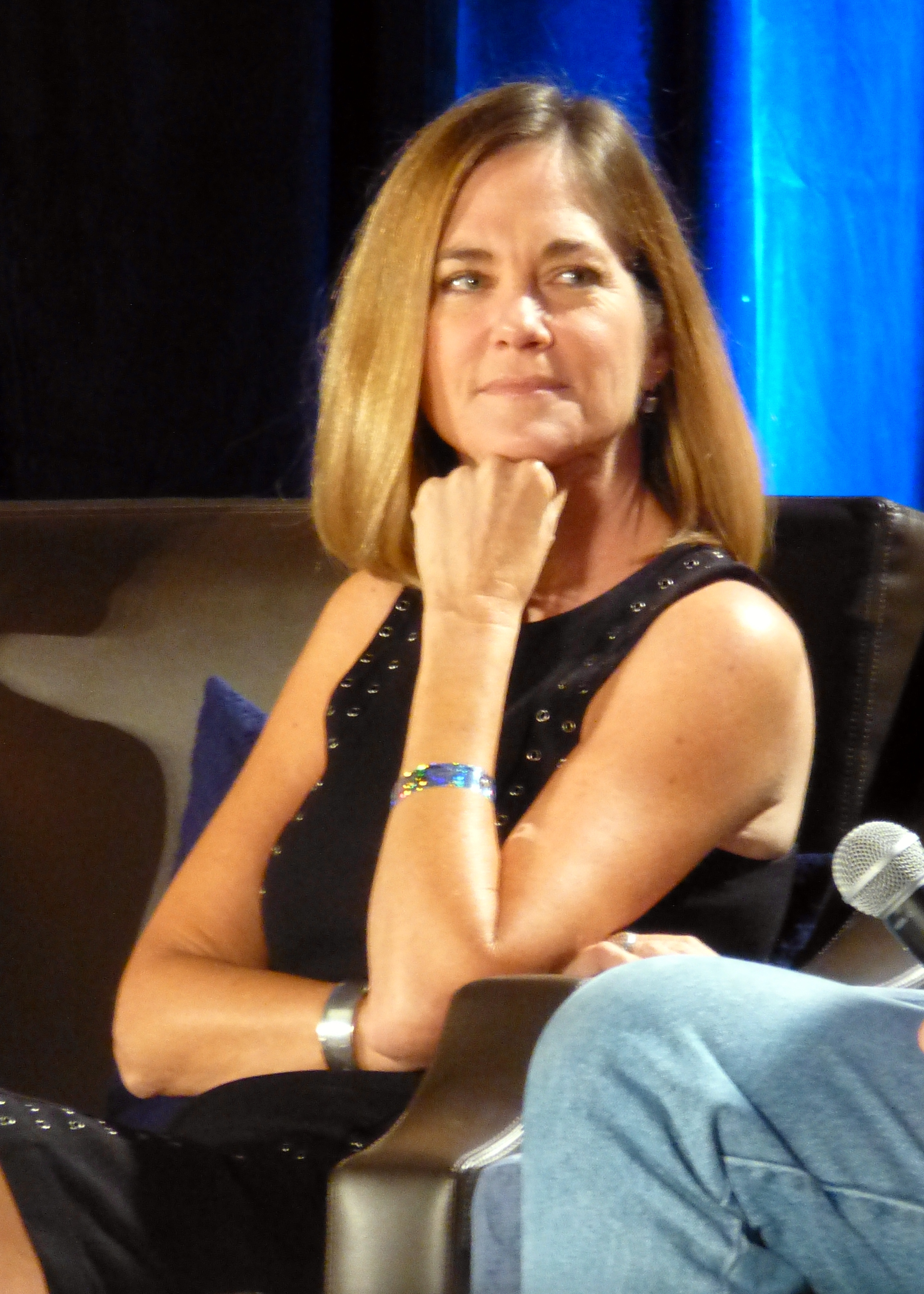
- DePaiva in 2015
- Born: Katherine Virginia Wesley; March 21, 1961 (age 65); Morganfield, Kentucky, U.S.
- Education: Indiana University Bloomington; University of California, Los Angeles
- Occupations: Actress and singer
- Years active: 1986–present
- Spouse(s): Richard C. Hankins (m. 1988; div. 1995) James DePaiva (m. 1996)
- Children: 1
- Website: kassiedepaiva.com

Katherine Virginia "Kassie" DePaiva (née Wesley; born March 21, 1961) is an American actress and singer. She is best known for playing the roles of Chelsea Reardon on the CBS soap opera Guiding Light (1986 to 1991), Blair Cramer on the ABC soap opera One Life to Live (1993 to 2013), and Eve Donovan on the NBC soap opera Days of Our Lives (2014 to 2020, 2023). She received one Daytime Emmy Award nomination for her role on One Life to Live and two nominations for her role on Days Of Our Lives. DePaiva also starred as Bobby Joe in the horror film Evil Dead II (1986). As a singer, she has released three albums, Naked (2000), No Regrets (2005), and I Want to Love You (2007).

== Early life ==
DePaiva was born and raised in Morganfield, Kentucky. Her birth name is Katherine Virginia Wesley. She was named after two of her aunts. Her father was a lawyer who practiced all types of law because of the small town they lived in. DePaiva has two older brothers and one younger sister.

In her childhood and teens, she sang in the church choir, participated in school plays, and she was involved in class government. She was voted Most Talented in her high school class. After high school, DePaiva attended Indiana University Bloomington and worked at Opryland USA in Nashville, Tennessee. She made her professional singing debut at the Grand Ole Opry when she was eighteen years old, singing two songs. She then decided to transfer to University of California, Los Angeles to study theater.

== Career ==
=== 1979-1993: Early work ===
While attending UCLA, DePaiva landed her first acting job in a television commercial for Wendy's. She joined a four-part harmony band called Newport. The group performed in the Los Angeles, San Diego, and Las Vegas areas. She dropped out of college to travel with Newport on a USO tour of Japan, Korea, and Okinawa. After returning to the United States, DePaiva became a back up singer for Bobby Womack. She joined him on two U.S. tours and one tour of Great Britain.

Returning to acting, DePaiva (then using her maiden name of Wesley) landed the role of Bobby Joe in Evil Dead II. She then joined the cast of the CBS soap opera Guiding Light as Chelsea Reardon, first airing in November 1986. The character was a singer, giving DePaiva the opportunity to perform regularly on the show. After four years, she decided to leave due to lack of storyline, last airing in January 1991.

After leaving Guiding Light, she guest starred in episodes of Time Trax, Melrose Place, and Baywatch. An avid golfer, DePaiva hosted The Pro Shop, a syndicated series about the sport.

=== 1993-2006: One Life to Live ===
Kassie DePaiva in-person autograph received at the Trumbull Mall (Connecticut) in the 1990s

DePaiva was cast as Blair Cramer on the ABC soap opera One Life to Live, first airing December 17, 1993. The role had previously been played by Mia Korf, an Asian-American actress. She received a Soap Opera Digest Award nomination for Hottest Actress in 1998 for her role on OLTL.

In 2000, DePaiva released her debut album, Naked. She described the music as being very raw and female-oriented. On February 14, 2002, she and her husband, James DePaiva, starred on stage in A. R. Gurney's Love Letters at Jersey Central Theatre. In 2005, she released her second album, No Regrets, a collection of pop country songs. She also performed a duet with Jim Brickman on his album, The Disney Songbook, singing "Baby Mine" from Dumbo.

In March 2005, DePaiva received her first Daytime Emmy Award nomination for Outstanding Lead Actress in a Drama Series for her role on One Life to Live. She co-starred with Jack Scalia in the short film Exit, written and directed by Jamie Duneier. She starred in and produced the film Undone (2006), which was directed by her husband, James DePaiva. The film co-starred Heather Tom, Timothy D. Stickney, Forbes March, and Ricky Paull Goldin.

In 2006, DePaiva performed the song "Simply Love" on One Life: Many Voices for Hurricane Relief, an album of songs by One Life to Live actors to raise funds for victims of Hurricane Katrina. She sang Have Yourself a Merry Little Christmas on A Holiday Affair, an album of classic holiday songs performed by actors from ABC soap operas. She also performed with the ensemble on the closing track, We Wish You a Merry Christmas. The album was promoted with a Soapnet special, A Very Soapy Christmas.

=== 2007-2016: OLTL and Days ===
DePaiva released her third album, I Want to Love You, in 2007. She described the album as being more unplugged and bluegrass than her earlier recordings. In 2009, she co-starred with her husband, James DePaiva, in a Time Life infomercial for a CD box set, The Power of Love.

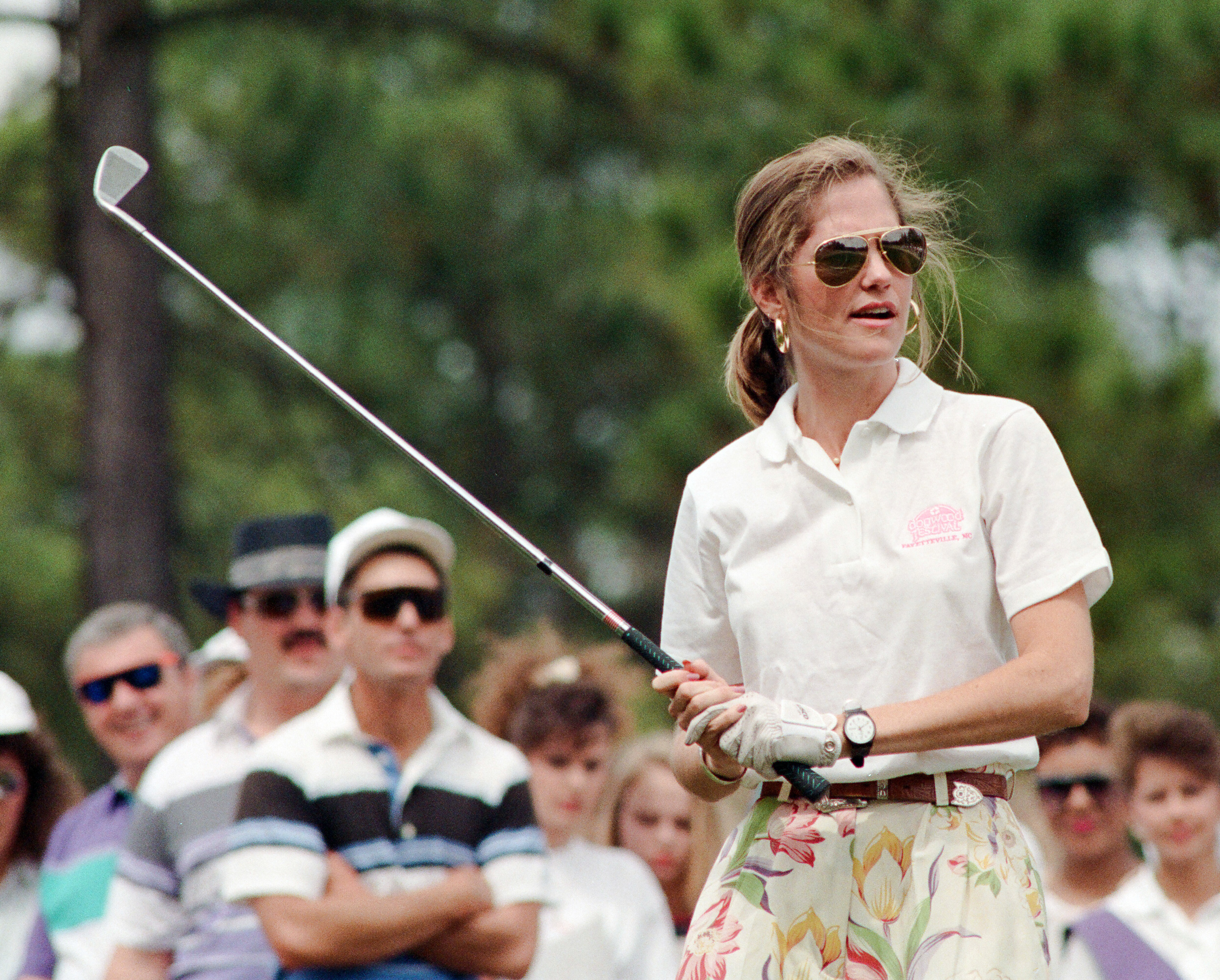
Playing charity golf at the Fayetteville Dogwood Festival in Fayetteville, NC. ca 1994

DePaiva played Blair Cramer on One Life to Live until the final episode aired on ABC in January 2012. That same year, she also made several guest appearances as Blair on the ABC soap opera General Hospital. She then played the role in an online revival of OLTL for several months in 2013. DePaiva played Emma Parker in the thriller film We Are What We Are in 2013. She co-starred with Julia Garner and Ambyr Childers. In May 2013, she co-starred with her husband, James DePaiva, in the musical 110 in the Shade at the Community School of Naples.

In January 2014, Soap Opera Digest announced that DePaiva had joined the cast of the NBC soap opera Days of Our Lives as Eve Donovan. The role had previously been played by Charlotte Ross, who left the show in 1991. DePaiva's first airdate was June 18, 2014. In September 2015, DePaiva announced that she would be leaving Days of Our Lives. Her final airdate was February 2, 2016. She received a Daytime Emmy Award nomination for Outstanding Lead Actress in 2016 for her role on Days. DePaiva made a return appearance to Days, airing on December 9, 2016.

=== 2016-present ===
In 2016, DePaiva made a guest appearance on Castle, alongside her former One Life to Live co-stars Tuc Watkins and Darlene Vogel. She had worked with the star of the series, Nathan Fillion, when he was a cast member on OLTL in the 1990s.

She returned to Days of Our Lives as Eve Donovan, first airing on October 27, 2017. She briefly left the show in October 2018 and returned in December of that year. She once again left the show in December 2019. DePaiva received a Daytime Emmy Award nomination for Outstanding Supporting Actress in 2019 for her role on Days. She returned to the show for a few months in 2020.

She appeared in the film Killian & the Comeback Kids in 2020, playing the wife of Nathan Purdee, her former One Life to Live co-star. The film was completed in 2018. She co-starred with Wally Kurth in the short film Common as Red Hair in 2022. DePaiva made return appearances to General Hospital as Blair Cramer and Days of Our Lives as Eve Donovan in 2023.

== Personal life ==
In the 1980s, she dated Sam Raimi, who directed her in Evil Dead II. He moved to New York with her in 1986, when she was cast on Guiding Light, and they lived together for four months.

She married Richard C. Hankins, Guiding Light's art director, on September 10, 1988. They divorced in 1995.

DePaiva (then known by her maiden name, Kassie Wesley), first met James DePaiva in the late 1980s at the Whaler Bar in New York, where she was singing. They didn't see each other again until 1993, when she was cast as his love interest, Blair Cramer, on One Life to Live. They were married on May 31, 1996, at the courthouse in her hometown, Morganfield, Kentucky. Kassie has said that she scheduled her wedding in between a dentist appointment and a golf game. They had a more formal ceremony in June 1996 at their home in the Catskills. The second wedding included James' daughter from his previous marriage, who was four years old at the time.

The DePaivas have one child together, son James Quentin (J. Q.) DePaiva, who was born on May 12, 1997. When he was twelve months old, they learned that he had been born with an enlarged vestibular aqueduct, an inner-ear abnormality causing him to be completely deaf. He received his first cochlear implant at eighteen months old and his second at eight years old. In 2007, J.Q. had a recurring role on All My Children as Jason. His character appeared on Erica Kane's talk show to help her daughter, Kendall, deal with the hearing loss of her son, Spike.

DePaiva is a board member and fund raiser for the League for the Hard of Hearing, a non profit that aids deaf people and their families. She has crocheted a line of hats, called "Happy Hats", and sold them online, donating the profits to deaf charities. She has also lobbied congress to make hearing tests mandatory for newborns in all fifty states.

In August 2016, DePaiva announced that she had been diagnosed with acute myeloid leukemia the month prior. In September 2023, she announced that she had been diagnosed with breast cancer a year after beginning treatment for leukemia. She is now cancer free.

== Filmography ==
=== Film ===
Year	Title	Role	Notes
1986	Evil Dead II	Bobby Joe	Credited as Kassie Wesley
2005	Exit	Andie	Short film
2006	Undone		Also producer
2008	The Story of Your Life	Red Sauce	
2013	We Are What We Are	Emma Parker	
2020	Killian & the Comeback Kids	Mrs. Raison	
2022	Common as Red Hair	Carol	Short film

=== Television ===
Year	Title	Role	Notes
1986-1991	Guiding Light	Chelsea Reardon	Contract role: October 27, 1986 - January 25, 1991 Credited as Kassie Wesley
1993-2012; 2013	One Life to Live	Blair Cramer	Contract role: December 17, 1993 - January 13, 2012; April 29 - August 19, 2013 Sometimes credited as Kassie Wesley and Kassie Wesley DePaiva
1993	The Pro Shop	Herself (Host)	Credited as Kassie Wesley
1993	Time Trax	Caitlin Carlisle	Episode: "Beautiful Songbird" Credited as Kassie Wesley
1994	Melrose Place	Betty Benson-Chappell	Episode: "Reunion Blues" Credited as Kassie Wesley
1994	Baywatch	Crystal Harris	Episode: "Western Exposure" Credited as Kassie Wesley
2012; 2023	General Hospital	Blair Cramer	Recurring role: March 2, 2012 - December 3, 2012; September 15, 2023
2014-2020; 2023	Days of Our Lives	Eve Donovan	Contract role; Recurring role: June 18, 2014 – February 2, 2016; September 8 – October 4, 2016; December 9, 2016 – December 12, 2016; October 27, 2017 – December 24, 2019; July 30, 2020 – September 25, 2020; 2023
2016	Castle	Joanna Masters	Episode: "Witness for the Prosecution"

== Discography ==
=== Albums ===
- Naked (2000)
- No Regrets (2005)
- I Want to Love You (2007)

=== Other appearances ===
- "Baby Mine" on Jim Brickman's The Disney Songbook. (2005)
- "Simply Love" on One Life: Many Voices for Hurricane Relief (2006)
- "Have Yourself a Merry Little Christmas" on ABC daytime's A Holiday Affair. (2006)
- "We Wish You a Merry Christmas" (Ensemble) on ABC daytime's A Holiday Affair. (2006)

== Awards and nominations ==
List of acting awards and nominations
Year	Award	Category	Title	Result	Ref.
1998	Soap Opera Digest Award	Hottest Female Star	One Life to Live	Nominated	
2001	Soap Opera Digest Award	Outstanding Lead Actress	One Life to Live	Nominated	
2003	Soap Opera Digest Award	Outstanding Lead Actress	One Life to Live	Nominated	
2005	Daytime Emmy Award	Most Irresistible Combination (shared with Trevor St. John)	One Life to Live	Nominated	
2005	Daytime Emmy Award	Outstanding Lead Actress in a Drama Series	One Life to Live	Nominated	
2005	Soap Opera Digest Award	Outstanding Lead Actress	One Life to Live	Nominated	
2008	Hoboken International Film Festival	Best Actress (Feature Film)	Undone	Nominated	
2016	Daytime Emmy Award	Outstanding Lead Actress in a Drama Series	Days of Our Lives	Nominated	
2019	Daytime Emmy Award	Outstanding Supporting Actress in a Drama Series	Days of Our Lives	Nominated	

== See also ==
- Todd Manning and Blair Cramer
