= Light Up the Night =

Light Up the Night may refer to:

== Music ==
=== Albums ===
- Light Up the Night (The Brothers Johnson album), 1980
- Light Up the Night (Jess Moskaluke album), 2014
- Light Up the Night, an album by Mike Stevens

=== Songs ===
- "Light Up the Night" (Protomen song), 2009
- "Light Up the Night" (Boyzone song), 2014
- "Light Up the Night", a song by the Black Eyed Peas from The Beginning
- "Light Up the Night", a song by Warr Acres from Hope Will Rise
- "Light Up the Night", a song by the Besnard Lakes from The Besnard Lakes Are the Roaring Night
- "Light Up the Night", a song by Symphony X from Iconoclast
- "Light Up the Night", a song by Recover from This May Be the Year I Disappear
