= Destine (disambiguation) =

Destine was a Dutch rock band.

Destine may refer to:

- Destin Destine (born 1895), Haitian sport shooter
- Jean-Léon Destiné (1918–2013), Haitian-American dancer and choreographer
- Jean-Marc Destine (born 1973), Haitian runner

== See also ==
- Destiny (disambiguation)
