= Kristy Starling (album) =

Studio album by Kristy Starling
- Released: April 22, 2003
- Genre: Contemporary Christian Music
- Length: 42:03
- Label: Warner
- Producers: David Foster, Richard Marx, Billy Mann, Dan Muckala, Pete Kipley

Kristy Starling chronology
Kristy Starling (2003)	Warr Acres (2011)

Kristy Starling is the debut album by Kristy Starling. It was released by Warner Bros. Records on April 22, 2003. The album consist of Contemporary Christian songs, as well as a cover of LeAnn Rimes' 2000 hit song, "I Need You" and Josh Groban's "To Where You Are". The album peaked at number twenty-four on the Billboard Contemporary Christian.

== Critical response ==
Professional ratings
Review scores
Source	Rating
Allmusic	4/5 stars

Aaron Latham of Allmusic praised the album stating, "All the elements are there for a hit record."

== Track listing ==
No.	Title	Writer(s)	Length
1.	"Water"	Jess Cates, Guy Zabka	4:03
2.	"As Long As We're Here"	Jan Buckingham	4:38
3.	"Broken"	George Rowe	4:16
4.	"There Will Come A Day"	Chris Lindsey, Bill Luther, Aimee Mayo	4:23
5.	"Something More (I Need To Praise You)"	Tyler Hayes Bieck, Trina Harmon	4:10
6.	"You Love Me Like That"	Gary Burr, Billy Mann	3:43
7.	"All For You"	Gary Burr, Billy Mann	4:14
8.	"To Where You Are"	Richard Marx, Linda Thompson	3:54
9.	"Must Have Been Angels"	Wayne Tester, Linda Thompson	4:16
10.	"I Need You"	Ty Lacy, Dennis Matkosky	3:10
Total length:			42:03

== Personnel ==
Credits for Kristy Starling are adapted from Allmusic.

- Kristy Starling – lead vocals, backing vocals
- Pete Kipley – programming, acoustic guitar, electric guitar, bass, string arrangements
- Tim Akers – acoustic piano
- Dan Muckala – programming, string arrangements
- Billy Mann – programming, guitars, backing vocals
- David Foster – acoustic piano, arrangements
- Richard Marx – keyboards, arrangements
- Pete Wallace – programming
- Jerry McPherson – electric guitar
- Alex Nifong – acoustic guitar, electric guitar
- Chris Rodriguez – acoustic guitar
- Michael Thompson – guitars
- Dan Warner – guitars
- Tracy Ferrie – bass
- Mark Hill – bass
- Dan Needham – drums
- Jochem van der Saag – drum programming
- Eric Darken – percussion
- Rob Mathes – string arrangements and conductor
- Daniel O'Lannerghty – orchestration
- William Ross – arrangements
- The Nashville String Machine – strings
- Lisa Cochran – backing vocals
- Nirva Dorsaint – backing vocals
- Desmond Pringle – backing vocals
- Erin O'Donnell – backing vocals

== Production ==
- Lee Bridges – assistant, digital editing
- Tammie Harris Cleek – creative director
- David Cole – engineer
- Tom Coyne – mastering
- David Foster – executive producer, producer
- Jaymes Foster-Levy – A&R
- Humberto Gatica – mixing
- David Kaufman – wardrobe
- Barry Landis – executive producer
- Billy Mann – producer, mixing
- Nick Marshall – assistant
- Richard Marx – producer, arrangements
- J.R. McNeely – engineer
- Shawn McSpadden – A&R
- Dan Muckala – producer
- Bridgett Evans O'Lannerghty – production coordination
- Matt Prock – engineer
- Dave Reitzas – engineer
- Christian Robles – assistant
- Alejandro Rodriguez – mix assistant
- Ray Roper – design
- John Saylor – assistant
- Lisa Sciascia – photography
- Melanie Shelley – hair stylist, make-up
- Dan Shike – assistant
- F. Reid Shippen – engineer, mixing
- Jay Smith – design

== Chart ==
Chart (2003)	Peak position
US Billboard Contemporary Christian	24
