= DJ Sabrina the Teenage DJ =

English electronic music producer

- Origin: London, England
- Genres: Outsider house; plunderphonics; Chicago house
- Years active: 2017–present
- Website: djsabrinatheteenagedj.com

DJ Sabrina the Teenage DJ (abbreviated DJSTTDJ) is a pseudonymous London-based electronic producer. Her name is a reference to the television sitcom Sabrina the Teenage Witch, inspired by a comment on YouTube. She released her debut album, Makin' Magick, in 2017. Her main musical influences include plunderphonics musicians and the 2010s UK outsider house scene.

DJ Sabrina collaborated with her sibling Salem on Makin' Magick, which led to Salem being credited as a member of a duo with Sabrina by some media outlets. "[T]he bio has always mentioned Sabrina and Salem, but I like the idea of it being a mystery," the artist has stated.

== Influences ==
DJ Sabrina started making house music in 2014, influenced by the release of Caustic Window by Aphex Twin. She was first exposed to the UK outsider house scene from DJ Seinfeld in 2016 through the music blog aggregator Hype Machine. DJ Sabrina has cited albums such as the Avalanches' Since I Left You and Daft Punk's Homework as major influences. Starting with Enchanted, she began to incorporate elements of acid house into her music. DJ Sabrina the Teenage DJ often samples music and television shows from the late 1980s to the early 2000s. DJ Sabrina has stated that her album cover arts are inspired by pixel art of '90s video games.

== Career ==
DJ Sabrina the Teenage DJ debuted in 2017 with the release of a two-hour-long album, Makin' Magick. Three more albums followed in 2018 and 2019. In 2020, she released Charmed, a three-hour-long album that became "an underground pandemic hit". In April 2021, she released the single "Try Not to Be Afraid" in collaboration with musicians Delilah Brao, Luke Markinson, and Anyela Gómez, which was described as "highly nostalgic". DJ Sabrina the Teenage DJ since released six further albums from 2021 to 2024.

In addition to her albums and singles, she also produces mixtapes, which she call "combinisions", a portmanteau of "combinational composition". She has released four sets of combinisions, each with five to seven mixes. Most combinisions are between 30 and 40 minutes long, but some exceed an hour, and Homeshake is over two hours long.

On 3 August 2022, the 1975 released "Happiness", the second single from their album Being Funny in a Foreign Language, which was written by DJ Sabrina the Teenage DJ with band members Matty Healy and George Daniel.

== Discography ==
=== Albums ===
Studio albums
Title	Album details
Makin' Magick	Released: 29 September 2017; Released: 23 July 2026 (Rewitched) Remaster; Formats: Download, cassette, CD (Rewitched), LP (Rewitched)
Witchkraft	Released: 13 July 2018; Released: 23 July 2026 (Rewitched) Remaster; Formats: Download, cassette, CD (Rewitched), LP (Rewitched)
Spellbound!	Released: 29 May 2019; Formats: Download, cassette
Enchanted	Released: 6 December 2019; Formats: Download, cassette
Charmed	Released: 25 November 2020; Formats: Download, cassette, LP
The Other Realm	Released: 26 November 2021; Formats: Download, cassette, CD
The Makin' Magick II Album	Released: 26 November 2021; Formats: Download, cassette, CD
Bewitched!	Released: 30 August 2022; Formats: Download, cassette, CD, LP
Destiny	Released: 13 August 2023; Formats: Download, cassette, CD, LP
Hex	Released: 10 August 2024; Formats: Download, cassette, CD, LP, MiniDisc
Sorcery	Released: 6 December 2024; Formats: Download, cassette, CD, LP, MiniDisc
Fantasy	Released: 12 December 2025; Formats: Download, cassette, CD, LP

Compilation albums
Title	Album details
Remixes	Released: 4 December 2020; Formats: Download; Includes remixes of songs by other artists
Chet Larson: Music from the Original Motion Picture Soundtrack	Released: 14 September 2021; Formats: Download; Includes edits of songs from previous albums
Destextrinum	Released: 8 November 2023; Formats: Download, cassette, LP; A remix album of Destiny inspired by John Oswald's Plexure
Destiny (Drumless Edition)	Released: 17 November 2023; Formats: Download; A drumless version of Destiny

Box sets
Title	Album details
Pentalogy	Released: 27 January 2021; Formats: Cassette, CD; Includes: Makin' Magick, Witchkraft, Spellbound!, Enchanted, Charmed
Combinisions II	Released: 16 October 2021; Formats: CD; Includes: Fuels; Belongings, Beginnings; Dakota Style; Rise 'n' Star; Life Fast Lite; To the Max; Amity Spirit
Combinisions I	Released: 26 March 2022; Formats: CD; Includes: Summer Social, Homeshake, New Atlantic, ShopPop, Of Three, Remixes
Combinisions III	Released: 26 March 2022; Formats: CD; Includes: Centember Soun-; Hours, Hers?; Space 4 Space; Prime Architect; Harbor Park; Exceptional Experience; Pseudo Quest
Combinisions IV	Released: 9 May 2024; Formats: CD; Includes: Sabrina Collectable Trading Cards; Not Too Serious; That All Sound The Same; Yacht Club Crew Gathering; Destextrinum

=== EPs ===
EPs
Title	EP details
Demos	Released: 8 January 2020; Formats: Download; Includes 8 demos of previously released tracks
Call You/Under Your Spell	Released: 18 July 2022; Formats: Download, LP; Includes 5 tracks from Bewitched!
Bewitched and Beyond	Released: 30 August 2022; Formats: Download, LP; Includes 4 tracks from Bewitched!, 2 tracks from Destiny, and 1 track from Hex
Sabrina's Hits #1	Released: 1 March 2023; Formats: Download, LP; Includes 4 tracks from Destiny
Something New/Doubts	Released: 5 May 2023; Formats: Download, LP; Includes 4 tracks from Destiny
Anything Lost (Can Be Found Again)	Released: 25 March 2024; Formats: Download, LP; Includes 2 tracks from Hex, 2 tracks from Sorcery, and 1 track from Fantasy
Magickraft	Released: 23 July 2026; Formats: Download, CD, LP; Includes 7 tracks of never before released/finished B-sides from ~2012-2018

=== Singles ===
Singles
Title	Album	Release date	Notes
"Try Not to Be Afraid"	Non-album singles	19 April 2021	featuring Delilah Brao, Luke Markinson, and Anyelisax
"It's Magic"	Non-album singles	3 June 2021	featuring Yung Thicc Boi
"Closure"	Non-album singles	3 August 2021	featuring Delilah Brao
"Practically Everywhere"	Non-album singles	12 November 2021	featuring Nameless Warning
"Call You"	Bewitched!	20 April 2022	
"Under Your Spell"	Bewitched!	24 April 2022	
"Choices"	Spellbound!	8 July 2022	Reissued as a charity single to benefit NARAL Pro-Choice America following the Dobbs v. Jackson decision.
"Dance Now"	Destiny	31 October 2022	
"All I Can Feel"	Destiny	24 December 2022	
"Brave"	Destiny	18 January 2023	
"Princess"	The Makin' Magick II Album	17 February 2023	Reissued as a charity single to benefit Mermaids following the murder of Brianna Ghey.
"It's Still Me"	Destiny	1 March 2023	
"Something New"	Destiny	24 March 2023	
"Doubts"	Destiny	14 April 2023	
"Everything We Do"	Sorcery	17 September 2023	Originally titled "(Livin' in a) Barbie's Paradise". Includes the Fantasy track "Fine" on the B-side.
"Say What You Mean"	Sorcery	31 October 2023	
"Honey"	Destiny	30 November 2023	Includes the B-side "Change Your Ways".
"Stronger Together"	Hex	8 December 2023	
"Anything Lost (Can Be Found Again)"	Hex	3 January 2024	
"Come Find Out"	Hex	19 April 2024	Includes the Fantasy track "In My Eyes" on the B-side.
"Deep Down"	Hex	31 May 2024	Originally released in 2020 as a remix of Harrison BDP – "Watching the World Go By".
"In Silence"	Hex	28 June 2024	
"Will My Love"	Fantasy	11 January 2025	
"Keep Wondering Why"	Fantasy	5 April 2025	
"Search For the Feeling (On and On)"	Fantasy	20 May 2025	
"Throwdown"	Fantasy	28 June 2025	
"Sunset Years"	Fantasy	25 July 2025	
"Whatever You Have"	Fantasy	28 August 2025	
"Not There Yet"	Fantasy	7 November 2025	
"Don’t Listen to Me"	Fantasy	20 December 2025	Includes the B-side "Peace of Mind".
"HeartsDesires"	Non-album singles	6 March 2026	
"Still Standing"	Non-album singles	31 July 2026	
"Junior Beat"	Non-album singles	4 September 2026	
"You Didn’t Tell Me You Didn’t Need Me"	Non-album singles	2 October 2026	
"Be (With U)"	Non-album singles	6 November 2026	

=== Mixtapes ===
- Summer Social (25 August 2017)
- Homeshake (1 November 2017)
- New Atlantic (29 November 2017)
- ShopPop (20 December 2018)
- Of Three (31 August 2020)
- Fuels (Note: Styled in all caps as FUELS.) (3 November 2020)
- Belongings, Beginnings (6 October 2020)
- Dakota Style (8 February 2021)
- Rise 'n' Star (6 March 2021)
- Life Fast Lite (27 March 2021)
- To the Max (14 April 2021)
- Amity Spirit (For Outer Reach music festival) (17 October 2021)
- Centember Soun- (23 December 2021)
- Hours, Hers? (27 March 2022)
- Space 4 Space (10 February 2022)
- Prime Architect (1 March 2022)
- Harbor Park (22 March 2022)
- Exceptional Experience (22 April 2022)
- Pseudo Quest (22 April 2022)
- S.C.T.C. (Note: Initialism for Sabrina Collectable Trading Cards.) (31 January 2023)
- Not Too Serious (18 October 2023)
- That All Sound The Same (1 March 2024)
- Yacht Club Crew Gathering (14 April 2024)
- Treble Fine (16 June 2024)
- Quittin' the Business (30 September 2024)
- On Your Phones (18 October 2026)

=== Official remixes ===
- DJ Boring – "Winona"
- DJ Seinfeld – "Time Spent Away From You"
- Ross From Friends – "Talk to Me, You'll Understand"
- Nelly – "Country Grammar"
- Mall Grab – "Feel U"
- Harrison BDP – "Watching the World Go By"
- Baltra – "Fade Away"
- Blushed – "Needy"
- Spunsugar – "(You Never) Turn Around"
- The Westerlies – "Saro"
- Porter Robinson – "Mirror"
- Sandy Hawkins – "Daddy Didn't Want Me to Sing"
- Superorganism – "Teenager"
- Small Black – "Despicable Dogs"
- Small Black – "Bad Lover"
- Flight Facilities (feat. Enumclaw) – "Days of the Week"
- Hotline TNT – "I Thought You'd Change"
- Trivial Shields – “Incomplete”
- GIVE LOVE – "In Your Mind"
- Lowswimmer – “IRL”
- Touching Ice – “Prey”
- Wednesday – “Elderberry Wine”
- Madeline Kenney – “Scoop”

=== Other credits ===
- The 1975 – "Happiness" – co-writers
- Courting – "We Look Good Together (Big Words)" – co-writers/keyboards
- Nameless Warning – “SHOWME” – co-writers
