= My Destiny =

My Destiny may refer to:

- My Destiny (Kim English album), or the title song
- My Destiny (Yomo album), or the title song
- My Destiny (EP), by Leaves' Eyes
- "My Destiny" (Katharine McPhee song)
- "My Destiny" (Lionel Richie song)
- "My Destiny", a song by Lyn from the original soundtrack of South Korean TV series My Love from the Star
- "My Destiny", a song by Dove Cameron from the American TV series Liv and Maddie
- "My Destiny ~Theme of Elise~", a song by Donna De Lory from the original soundtrack of 2006 video game Sonic the Hedgehog
- My Destiny (Malaysian TV series), 2008–09 TV series
- My Destiny (Philippine TV series), 2014 TV series

== See also ==
- Destiny (disambiguation)
