= Destiny (Jim Brickman song) =

Single by Jim Brickman

from the album Destiny
- Released: 1999
- Genre: Pop
- Length: 3:55
- Label: Windham Hill; BMG
- Songwriters: Jim Brickman; Dane Deviller; Sean Hosein
- Producers: Jim Brickman; David Pringle

Jim Brickman singles chronology
"Love of My Life" (1999)	"Destiny" (1999)	"Your Love" (1999)

Canada CD single cover
- French cover version

"Destiny" is a song co-written and performed by American recording artist Jim Brickman, featuring singer Jordan Hill and Billy Porter. It was released in 1999 on Windham Hill Records and BMG as the second single and as well as the thirteenth track from his fifth studio album of the same name. It is a pop song that was written by Dane Deviller, Sean Hosein and Jim Brickman and produced by the latter and by David Pringle.

== Charts ==
Chart (1999)	Peak position
Canada Adult Contemporary (RPM)	10
US Adult Contemporary (Billboard)	10
