= The Disney Songbook =

Studio album by Jim Brickman
- Released: October 5, 2005
- Recorded: 2004–2005
- Genre: Pop
- Length: 43:56
- Label: Walt Disney
- Producer: David Grow; Jim Brickman

Jim Brickman chronology
Grace (2005)	The Disney Songbook (2005)	Escape (2006)

Professional ratings
Review scores
Source	Rating
AllMusic	3.5/5 stars

The Disney Songbook is Jim Brickman's fourteenth album. Brickman is joined by guest vocalists, including Wayne Brady, Kassie DePaiva, Kimberley Locke and Josh Gracin. Heather Phares of AllMusic writes that "The Disney Songbook may not be among Brickman's all-time best albums, but it's never less than relaxing and sweet."

== Track listing ==
No.	Title	Writer(s)	Length
1.	"Beauty and the Beast"	Howard Ashman; Alan Menken	2:39
2.	"Mary Poppins Medley"	Robert B. Sherman; Richard M. Sherman	4:17
3.	"Cruella De Vil"	Mel Leven	2:42
4.	"Beautiful" (with Wayne Brady)	Jim Brickman; Jack Kugell; Jamie Jones	3:38
5.	"Reflection"	Matthew Wilder; David Zippel	3:10
6.	"When I See an Elephant Fly" (with Josh Gracin)	Ned Washington; Oliver Wallace	2:54
7.	"Zip-a-Dee-Doo-Dah"	Allie Wrubel; Ray Gilbert	3:39
8.	"Baby Mine" (with Kassie DePaiva)	Ned Washington; Frank Churchill	3:59
9.	"Can You Feel the Love Tonight"	Elton John; Tim Rice	3:47
10.	"A Dream Is a Wish Your Heart Makes" (with Kimberly Locke)	Mack David; Al Hoffman; Jerry Livingston	4:22
11.	"Someday My Prince Will Come"	Frank Churchill; Larry Morey	3:06
12.	"I'm Amazed" (with Lila McCann)	David Le Moyne Grow; Victoria Shaw	3:16
13.	"When You Wish Upon a Star"	Ned Washington; Leigh Harline	2:27
Total length:			43:56

- Track information and credits taken from the album's liner notes.

== Personnel ==
- Producer: David Grow, Jim Brickman
- Executive Producer: Jay Landers
- Associate Producer: Damon Whiteside
- A&R Coordinator: Dani Markman
- Mastered by: Dave Collins
- Photography: Rocky Schenck
- Art Direction: Gabrielle Raumberger
- Design: Brandon Fall
