= Peace (Jim Brickman album) =

Studio album by Jim Brickman
- Released: September 23, 2003
- Recorded: 2002
- Studios: Brickhouse Studios (Studio City, California); Howling Music Recording (Malibu, California); Megatrax Studios, Clearlake Studios and Entourage Studios (North Hollywood, California); Westlake Studios (Los Angeles, California); Eccolux Studios and RMI Studios (New York City, New York); OmniSound Studios (Nashville, Tennessee)
- Genres: Christmas, New-age, Jazz, Pop music
- Labels: Windham Hill, Bertelsmann Music Group
- Producers: Jim Brickman, David Grow, Eddie King, Billy Mann

Jim Brickman chronology
| Love Songs & Lullabies (2002) | Peace (2003) | Greatest Hits (2004) |

Peace is a studio album by Jim Brickman released on September 23, 2003. It is a Christmas album and received a Grammy Award Nomination for Best Pop Instrumental Album at the 46th Annual Grammy Awards.

"Sending You a Little Christmas" featured vocals by Kristy Starling. The single was written by Brickman along with Billy Mann and Victoria Shaw. It was his second number one on the Adult Contemporary chart. The song spent one week at number one, and only charted on the Adult Contemporary chart. In 2013, the song was covered by Johnny Mathis for his album Sending You a Little Christmas.

== Track listing ==
1. "We Three Kings" – 3:42
2. "Hark! The Herald Angels Sing" – 2:42
3. "Let It Snow! Let It Snow! Let It Snow!" – 2:45; featuring The Blind Boys of Alabama
4. "Early Snowfall" (Jim Brickman) – 3:04
5. "Do You Hear What I Hear?" – 4:05; featuring Anne Cochran and Tracy Silverman
6. "Away in a Manger" – 3:45
7. "Rejoice (O Come, O Come Emmanuel)" – 3:59
8. "O Holy Night" – 3:29
9. "Jingle Bells" – 4:21
10. "God Rest Ye Merry Gentlemen" – 4:05
11. "Sending You a Little Christmas" (Brickman, Billy Mann, Victoria Shaw) – 2:28; featuring Kristy Starling
12. "Blessings" (Brickman) – 2:28
13. "Peace (Where the Heart Is)" (Brickman, Keith Follesé) – 4:04; featuring Collin Raye

== Personnel ==
=== Musicians ===
- Jim Brickman – grand piano, arrangements (1, 2, 6, 8, 9, 10), backing vocals (5)
- Howard Pfeifer – additional keyboards (3), arrangements (3)
- Billy Mann – keyboard programming (11), arrangements (11), backing vocals (11)
- Chris Rojas – keyboard programming (11), arrangements (11)
- Bruce Watson – guitars (13)
- Jorgen Carlsson – additional guitars (13), bass (13)
- Dominic Genova – bass (3)
- Nick Vincent – drums (3)
- Matt Laug – drums (13), percussion (13)
- David Grow – additional percussion (3), arrangements (3, 7, 13), keyboards (5, 7, 13), backing vocals (5, 13), additional keyboards (12)
- George Purviance – Ethnic percussion (13)
- Joseph Stone – recorder (1), English horn (9)
- Steven Holtman – muted trombone (3)
- Eric Rigler – penny whistle (5)
- Tracy Silverman – 6-string viola (5, 7, 12), arrangements (7), violin (13)
- Ellie Choate – harp (6)
- Peggy Baldwin – cello (13)
- Eddie King – orchestrations (1, 2, 9, 10), arrangements (6)
- Cliff Bemis – vocal conductor (5, 7)
- The Blind Boys of Alabama – vocals (3)
- Anne Cochran – lead vocals (5), backing vocals (5)
- Ken Stacey – backing vocals (5, 13)
- Windy Wagner – backing vocals (5, 13)
- Kristy Starling – lead vocals (11)
- Collin Raye – lead vocals (13)
- Monty Allen – backing vocals (13)
- David Isaacs – backing vocals (13)

The Malibu Lake Holiday Singers (5 & 7)

- Cliff Bemis, David Grow, Phoebe Jevtovich, Ken Stacey and Windy Wagner

=== Production ===
- Jim Brickman – producer (1, 2, 4, 6, 8, 9, 10), piano recording (7), recording (8)
- Eddie King – producer (1, 2, 6, 9, 10), engineer (2, 4, 6, 9, 10)
- David Grow – producer (3, 5, 7, 12, 13), recording (3, 5, 7, 12, 13), mixing (3, 5, 7, 12, 13), additional recording (7)
- Billy Mann – producer (11)
- Chris Rojas – engineer (11)
- Rod Michaels – assistant engineer (3, 13), music editing (3, 13)
- Ashburn Miller – assistant engineer (3, 5, 7, 12)
- Dave Collins – mastering at Dave Collins Mastering (Hollywood, California)
- Michael Caprio – art direction, design
- Kevin Merrill – cover photography, studio photography
- Anne Cochran – winter scene photography
- Wendy Leonard – winter scene photography assistant
