= The Gift (Jim Brickman song) =

Single by Jim Brickman

from the album The Gift
- Released: 1997
- Genre: Country pop, Christmas
- Length: 3:44
- Label: Windham Hill
- Songwriters: Jim Brickman; Tom Douglas
- Producer: Dan Shea

Jim Brickman singles chronology
"Your Love" (1997)	"The Gift" (1997)	"After All These Years" (1998)

Music video
- "The Gift" on YouTube

"The Gift" is a song co-written and performed by American recording artist Jim Brickman, featuring singers Collin Raye and Susan Ashton. It was released in 1997 on Windham Hill Records as the first single and as well as the thirteenth track from his fourth studio album of the same name. It is a country pop song that was written by Jim Brickman and Tom Douglas. This song is often played on radio around the time of Christmas due to being part of Brickman's holiday album of the same name.

== Charts ==
=== Weekly charts ===
Chart (1997)	Peak position
Canada Country Singles (RPM)	52
US Adult Contemporary (Billboard)	3
US Hot Country Songs (Billboard)	51
US Radio Songs (Billboard)	65

=== Year-end charts ===
Chart (1998)	Position
US Adult Contemporary (Billboard)	16

== Cover version ==
The song became a cover version for Piolo Pascual performing The Gift from the movie Milan and duet with Claudine Barretto.

On September 25, 2022, Asia's Popstar Royalty Sarah Geronimo and her husband Matteo Guidicelli did a special cover of the 1997 country pop hit on ASAP Natin 'To with Jim Brickman himself.
