= Anne Cochran =

American singer

- Born: Cleveland, Ohio
- Occupation: Singer-songwriter
- Instrument: Vocals
- Years active: 1998–present
- Labels: Fishhead, A&E
- Website: AnneCochran.com

Anne Cochran is a singer-songwriter from Cleveland, Ohio. She is best known as the lead touring vocalist for pianist and songwriter Jim Brickman, with whom she shared the top 5 Adult Contemporary radio format hit single "After All These Years" in 1998. She has also released a number of solo albums, and the single "Someone Is Missing at Christmas" from her album This is the Season peaked at number 11 on the US Adult contemporary chart in 2005. She has shared duets with musicians and artists such as Donny Osmond, Michael Feinstein, Collin Raye, Dave Koz, Richie McDonald, Orlagh Fallon, Tracy Silverman, Jeff Timmons, Kristy Starling, Mario Frangoulis, Wayne Brady, Michael Bolton, Linda Eder and Mark Masri.

== Early life ==
Anne Cochran was born and raised in Cleveland, Ohio. She has stated she started singing around the same age she learned to talk, and at a young age her mother introduced her to singers such as Doris Day, Ella and Peggy Lee. Her older sister also introduced her to groups such as The Beatles, The Kinks, Paul Simon, and Motown. She soon started gaining stage experience as the lead in school musicals, and from her teens was successively the lead vocalist of a trio of Cleveland rock bands: Hash Brown Band, Timmy and the Tuxedos, and Nitebridge.

While attending Shaker Heights High School she became good friends with musician Jim Brickman, and they formed a band together. Together they won the You Light Up My Life radio contest, though they couldn't attend the attached cocktail lounge gigs because they were under 18.

Cochran earned a degree in theater and voice from Case Western Reserve University, and continued to perform in the Cleveland area after graduating. She met her husband soon after launching her self-titled debut album under the Fishhead label. The next nine years were largely devoted to raising their two sons, which put band life on hold. During this time, however, she pursued a career as a studio vocalist, singing in over 500 commercials.

== Work with Jim Brickman ==
In 1995, Jim Brickman had established a career as a successful songwriter and pianist. He asked Cochran to be his female vocalist on the Asian tour following the release of his album By Heart. Their first major concert in the US took place at Lincoln Center, where they displayed the rapport that became their trademark. According to Brickman, "Onstage, trust seems to be the glue. Anne knows me well enough that if I go off on a (piano) tangent, there's a reason for it."

=== "After All These Years" (1998) ===
In 1998 Brickman released the album Visions of Love, which featured Cochran as the vocalist on the single "After All These Years". The single, released by Windham Hill, proved to be Cochran's break into the mainstream when it became a top five hit on the radio.

Cochran became a regular fixture as touring lead vocalist with Brickman as well, and performed with him in such venues as Severance Hall and Carnegie Hall.

She sang "After All these Years" to accompany Olympic Medalist Rosalind Sumner's final skating performances with "Stars On Ice" in venues as Madison Square Garden, Gund Arena and also on NBC's A Golden Moment.

She appears on all four of the Brickman and Friends PBS specials, and often co-hosts Brickman's syndicated radio show. She also performs on Brickman's annual Brickman Cruise. Her solo vocals are featured on Brickman's 2011 Christmas CD All Is Calm.

As of 2012, she continues to tour as lead vocalist with Brickman and his live band.

== Solo career ==
Cochran has written and released a number of solo albums, starting with Thinking of You in 1998. She released the solo album Lucky Girl in 2000. The review AllMusic noted her "smooth voice and gentle style." Cover Girl followed in 2005, and the album All My Best: A Collection was released that year as well. In 2005, she also released the Christmas album This is the Season. Her single from the album, "Someone is Missing at Christmas", peaked at 11 on the Hot Adult Contemporary Tracks. In 2008, she released an all original cd, Close To Me and in 2010, Christmas Wish. In 2013 Anne reunited with long time friend and collaborator Abe LaMarca and released the single "Rise and Shine". The duet was well received by Smooth Jazz Radio and fans alike. The pair have since joined forces to do five sold out live shows together and in October 2015 Anne released her tenth full-length CD "Deeper" produced by LaMarca. The album's single "The Moment You Were Mine" entered the Adult Contemporary charts the following spring.

=== Close to Me (2009) ===
In 2009 she launched her solo album Close to Me to a standing room only audience at Cleveland's Nighttown. The album include several tracks written by Cochran, a duet with Jim Brickman, and three original tracks by Tracy Silverman, who also produced and recorded the album in Nashville. According to Fanfix, "it's an amazing album and a must have for any true music lover." According to the same review, "Hearing Anne sing for the first time is breathtaking. It's like stepping into a church and watching the light catch a beautiful piece of stained glass. It bring that same kind of peace and joy to me."

== Personal life ==
Cochran continues to live in Cleveland with her husband and two sons.

== Discography ==
=== Albums ===
- Anne Cochran
- Thinking of You (1998)
- Lucky Girl (2000)
- Cover Girl (2005)
- All My Best: A Collection (2005)
- This Is the Season (2005)
- Close to Me (2009)
- Christmas Wish (2010)
- Two of Hearts (2013)
- "Deeper (2015)

Album Collaborations

- All is Calm by Jim Brickman (2012)

=== Singles ===
Year	Single	Chart Positions	Album
Year	Single	US AC	Album
2005	"Someone Is Missing at Christmas"	11	This Is the Season

Guest singles

Year	Single	Artist	Chart Positions		Album
Year	Single	Artist	US AC	CAN AC	Album
1998	"After All These Years"	Jim Brickman	8	18	Visions of Love
