= Sending You a Little Christmas (album) =

Studio album by Johnny Mathis
- Released: October 29, 2013
- Recorded: 2013
- Studios: Starstruck Studios, Nashville, Tennessee, Loud Recording Studios, Nashville, Tennessee, Village Recorders, Los Angeles, California, Sunset Sound Recorders, Hollywood, California; Capitol Studios, Hollywood, California, Crescent Moon Studio, Miami, Florida, Gorbals Sound, Glasgow, Scotland
- Genre: Christmas
- Length: 43:32
- Label: Columbia
- Producer: Fred Mollin

Johnny Mathis chronology
The Ultimate Collection (2011)	Sending You a Little Christmas (2013)	The Classic Christmas Album) (2014)

Professional ratings
Review scores
Source	Rating
Allmusic	Positive
BREATHEcast.com	Positive
Examiner.com	3/5 stars
SacCulturalHub.com	Positive

Sending You a Little Christmas is the sixth Christmas album by American pop singer Johnny Mathis that was released on October 29, 2013, by Columbia Records. In addition to piano accompaniment on the title track by its composer Jim Brickman, this particular holiday release of original recordings (number six for Mathis) is distinguished by duets with guest vocalists Susan Boyle, Natalie Cole, Gloria Estefan, Vince Gill, Amy Grant, Billy Joel, and The Jordanaires.

== Recording ==
Mathis recalls, "My producer, Fred Mollin, and I wanted to do some duets," and the number of singing partners for this one project far exceeded the tally of pairings arranged for any of his previous studio albums. In addition to covering several familiar holiday favorites "we decided that we wanted a newer song and we came up with Jim Brickman's ["Sending You a Little Christmas"]. He'd recorded it before, but it gave the record that finishing touch." Brickman's original recording of the song featured Contemporary Christian singer Kristy Starling and spent a week at number one on Billboard magazine's Adult Contemporary chart after debuting there in December 2003. The musician enjoyed the time spent collaborating with Mathis. "It was surreal, and definitely a ‘pinch me’ moment. I was so honored, and he sounds so beautiful." The fact that Brickman originated the music definitely added to his experience. "It wasn’t something like ‘Silent Night,’ where you're just performing. It was actually a song that I wrote."

== Critical reception ==
After the album's release in October 2013 it was generally well-received, with some critics quite enthusiastic in their praise. BREATHEcast's Timothy Yap described the album as "the best amongst Mathis' canon of Christmas offerings," and Michael P. Coleman of Sac Cultural Hub wrote that Mathis was "serving as host of a wonderful Christmas party that you should think about crashing this season." Joe Szczechowski of Examiner.com was a bit more equivocal in his comments, describing it as a "solid" collection with Mathis in "fine vocal shape" but finding it lacking in comparison with his previous Christmas albums in noting that "there's nothing on Sending You a Little Christmas that would be considered a landmark recording.

== Promotion ==
Mathis appeared on the ABC daytime talk show The View on December 9, 2013, to perform "Sending You a Little Christmas" and was also interviewed during the visit by Whoopi Goldberg, Barbara Walters, and guest co-host Clinton Kelly. He also performed the title song on The Tonight Show with Jay Leno the following week, on December 17.

== Chart performance ==
The album Sending You a Little Christmas peaked at number 13 on Billboard magazine's list of the Top Holiday Albums and number 53 on the Billboard 200 album chart during the 2013 holiday season. It also became Mathis's first entry on the latter of the two since 2002's The Christmas Album, his previous release of new holiday material, and his highest charting entry there since 1978 when That's What Friends Are For, his duet album with Deniece Williams, reached number 19. The title track also did well that winter during its run on the magazine's Adult Contemporary chart, where its number four showing was also the highest that he'd had there since 1978 when he and Williams took "Too Much, Too Little, Too Late" to number one.

== Grammy nomination ==
On December 5, 2014, the album Sending You a Little Christmas was nominated for a Grammy Award for Best Traditional Pop Vocal Album and became Mathis's fourth release to be recognized in this category. His previous nods were for 1990's In a Sentimental Mood: Mathis Sings Ellington, 2005's Isn't It Romantic: The Standards Album, and 2010's Let It Be Me: Mathis in Nashville.

== Track listing ==
1. "The Christmas Song (Chestnuts Roasting on an Open Fire)" performed with Billy Joel (Mel Tormé, Robert Wells) – 3:56
2. "Have Yourself a Merry Little Christmas" performed with Natalie Cole (Ralph Blane, Hugh Martin) – 3:41
3. "This Christmas" (Donny Hathaway, Nadine McKinnor) – 4:05
4. "Sending You a Little Christmas" performed with Jim Brickman (piano) (James Brickman, William Mann, Victoria Shaw) – 3:53
5. "Mary's Boy Child" performed with Gloria Estefan (Jester Hairston) – 3:09
6. "This Is a Time for Love" (Dobie Gray, Bud Reneau) – 4:03
7. "Do You Hear What I Hear?" performed with Susan Boyle (Gloria Shayne Baker, Noël Regney) – 3:52
8. "Home for the Holidays" performed with The Jordanaires (Robert Allen, Al Stillman) – 3:07
9. "Merry Christmas Darling" (Richard Carpenter, Frank Pooler) – 3:13
10. "Decorate the Night" (Ray Chafin, Dobie Gray, Bud Reneau) – 3:33
11. Medley performed with Vince Gill and Amy Grant – 3:36
  a. "I'll Be Home for Christmas" (Kim Gannon, Walter Kent, Buck Ram)
  b. "White Christmas" (Irving Berlin)
12. "Count Your Blessings (Instead of Sheep)" (Irving Berlin) – 3:25

== Personnel ==
From the liner notes for the original album:

Musicians

- John Hobbs – piano, keyboards
- Pat Coil – piano, keyboards
- Jim Brickman – piano
- Tony Harrell – keyboards, accordion, harmonium
- Catherine Styron-Marx – keyboards
- Fred Mollin – keyboards, acoustic guitar, electric guitar, percussion, background vocals
- Bryan Sutton - acoustic guitar
- John Willis - acoustic guitar
- Kerry Marx - acoustic guitar, electric guitar
- Brent Mason - electric guitar
- Larry Paxton – bass
- Greg Morrow – drums, percussion
- Shannon Forrest – drums
- Paul Leim – drums, percussion
- Paul Franklin - pedal steel guitar
- Stuart Duncan – fiddle
- Russell Terrell - background vocals
- David Angell – violin
- Conni Ellisor – violin
- Mary Kathryn Vanosdale – violin
- Janet Askey – violin
- Gerald Greer – violin
- Wei Tsun Chang – violin
- Zeneba Bowers – violin
- Stefan Petrescu – violin
- David Davidson – violin
- Pam Sixfin – violin
- Allison Gooding – violin
- Karen Winkelman – violin
- Kristin Wilkinson – viola
- Seanad Chang – viola
- Monisa Angell – viola
- Chris Farrell – viola
- Dan Reinker – viola
- Kathryn Plummer – viola
- Anthony LaMarchina – cello
- Sari Reist – cello
- Matt Walker – cello
- Julie Tanner – cello
- Carol Rabinowitz – cello
- Phyliss Sparks – harp
- Erik Gratton – flute
- Roger Weissmeyer - oboe, English horn
- James Zimmerman – clarinet
- Harry Ditzel - French horn
- Beth Beeson - French horn
- Radu Rusu - French horn
- Jennifer Kumer - French horn
- Jim Hoke – horn
- Steve Patrick – horn
- Roy Agee – horn
- Doug Moffatt- horn
- Steve Herman – horn
- John Hinchey - horn

Production

- Johnny Mathis – vocals
- Fred Mollin – producer
- Gordon Goodwin - conductor, string and horn arranger
- Scott Lavender – conductor
- Matthew McCauley – conductor
- Kristin Wilkinson - contractor
- Kyle Lehning - track engineer, mixer
- "Teenage" Dave Salley - track and overdub engineer
- Casey Wood - track engineer
- Jared Clement - assistant engineer
- John Furr - assistant engineer
- Zach Allen - assistant engineer
- Ronnie Pinnell - assistant engineer
- Chris Wilkinson - assistant engineer
- Charlie Paakari - assistant engineer
- Chandler Harrod - assistant engineer
- Will Wetzel - assistant engineer
- Jason Lehning - additional recording
- Jake Burns - additional recording
- Jesse String - additional recording
- Chris Owens - additional recording
- Matt Rausch - additional recording
- Eric Schilling - additional recording
- Avril Mackintosh - additional recording
- Steve Anderson - producer (Susan Boyle's vocal)
- Cliff Masterson - producer (Susan Boyle's vocal)
- Greg Calbi – mastering
- Ed Blau – representation
- John McL. Doelp - A&R
- Sofia Abbasi – A&R coordinator
- Jeff Dunas – photography
- Dave Bett - art direction

== Bibliography ==
- Whitburn, Joel (2007), Joel Whitburn Presents Billboard Top Adult Songs, 1961-2006, Record Research Inc., ISBN 978-0898201697
- Whitburn, Joel (2010), Joel Whitburn Presents Top Pop Albums, Seventh Edition, Record Research Inc., ISBN 978-0-89820-183-3
