= City of Destiny =

City of Destiny may refer to:

== Cities ==
=== India ===
- Bahadurgarh, Haryana
- Visakhapatnam, Andhra Pradesh

=== United States ===
- Des Plaines, Illinois
- Sunnyvale, California, historically
- Tacoma, Washington

== Other ==
- New Destiny Christian Center, a church previously led by Paula White

== See also ==
- Destiny (disambiguation)
