= Destiny (given name) =

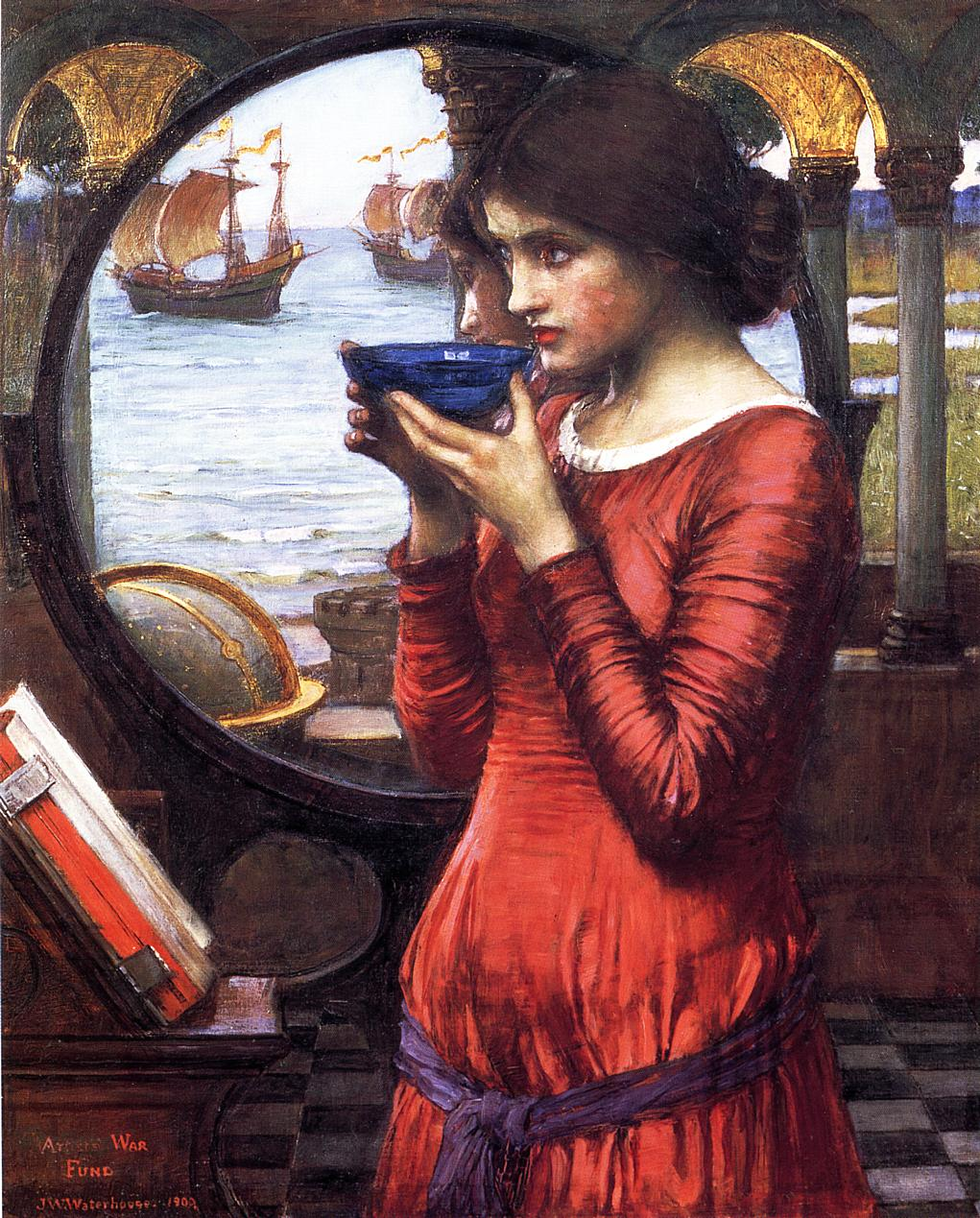
- Destiny by John William Waterhouse (1900)
- Gender: Primarily feminine

Origin
- Origin: English
- Meaning: "destiny, fate", to determine

Other names
- Related names: Hessa (name), Moira (given name)

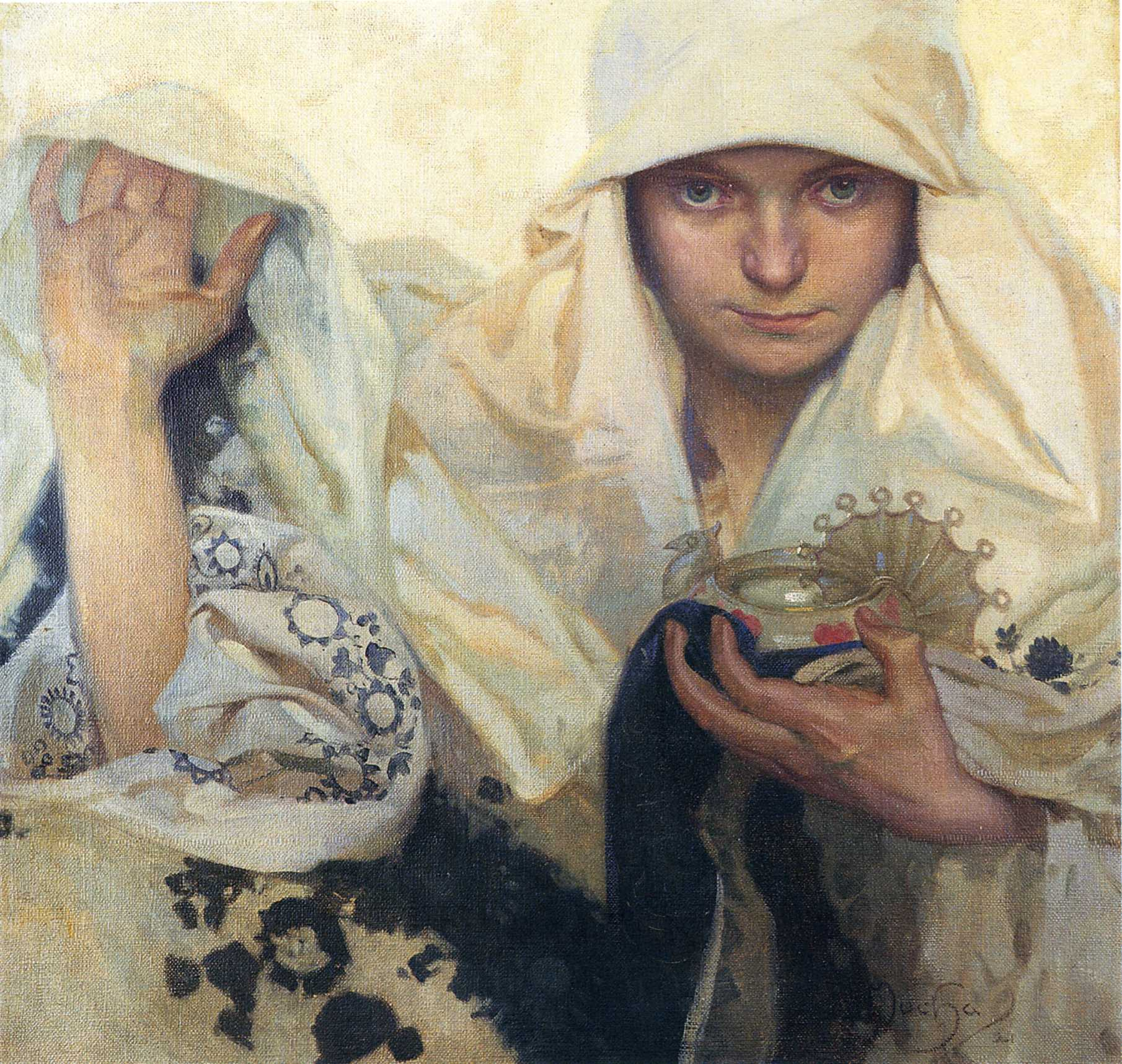
Destiny by Alphonse Mucha, 1920.

Destiny is a primarily feminine given name meaning "destiny", "fate", which is ultimately derived from the Late Latin word destinata. Commonly used spelling variants include Destinee, Destiney, and Destinie.

== Usage ==
The name and its variants were in use for girls by the 1800s in the United States. Destiny, spelling variant Destiney, and variants Destie, Destin, Destina, and Destine were recorded in U.S. census records from 1845 to 1923.

It has been a popular name in the United States, where it was ranked in the top 50 names given to baby girls between 1997 and 2008. It has since declined in use but remains among the top 500 names given to American girls. It has been among the top 1,000 names for girls born in England and Wales since 1996. It peaked in usage there between 2008 and 2010. It was among the top 100 names for girls born in New Zealand between 2000 and 2002, and for girls born in some Canadian provinces in 2001. It was also among the top 509 names for girls born in the Netherlands between 2008 and 2016.

== Women ==
- Destiny Carter (born 1992), American track and field athlete
- Destiny Chukunyere (born 2002), Maltese singer
- Destiny Clark, American singer, songwriter, and beauty pageant titleholder
- Destiny Hope Cyrus, the birth name of American singer, songwriter, and actress Miley Cyrus (born 1992)
- Destiny Deacon (1957–2024), Australian photographer
- Destiny Ekaragha, British film director
- Destiny Etiko (born 1989), Nigerian actress
- Destiny Frasqueri (born 1992), better known as Princess Nokia, American rapper
- Destiny Herndon-De La Rosa (born 1983), American activist
- Destiny Levere Bolling, American politician
- Destiny Lightsy, American actress, singer and dancer
- Destiny Norton (2000–2006), American murder victim
- Destiny Rogers (born 1999), American singer
- Destiny Slocum (born 1997), American basketball player
- Destiny Smith-Barnett (born 1996), American sprinter
- Destiny Vélez (born 1995), Miss Puerto Rico 2015
- Destiny Wagner (born 1996), Belizean author, TV host, model and beauty queen who was crowned Miss Earth 2021
- Destiny Williams (born 1991), American basketball player

== Men ==
- Steven Kenneth Bonnell II, known online as Destiny, American live streamer and political commentator
- Destiny Udogie (born 2002), Italian football player
- Destiny Vaeao (born 1994), American football defensive tackle

== Fictional characters ==
- Destiny Baker, a character from the Disney Channel sitcom Bunk'd
- Destiny, a whale shark and a character in the 2016 Disney/Pixar animated film Finding Dory
- Destiny, a character from Captain Scarlet and the Mysterons
- Destiny Evans, a character from the soap opera One Life to Live
- Destiny (Irene Adler), a character appearing in Marvel Comic books
- Destiny Rose, main character of the Philippine drama of the same name
- Big Destiny, a character in the Adventure Time episode "Crossover"
- Mr. Destiny Sparkle, a supporting character in the web series New Easton Sim Saturday Night

== See also ==
- Destiney Sue Moore, an American television personality
