= Destiny Church Groningen =

Dutch neo-charismatic church denomination

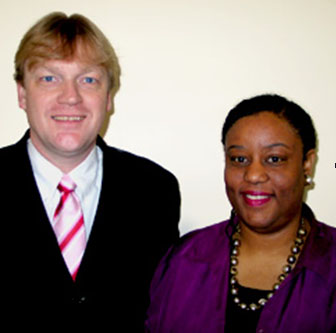
Johan and Tessa Proost

Destiny Church Groningen is a neo-charismatic church denomination which was founded in 1992 in Groningen, the Netherlands, by Johan and Tessa Proost.

== Origin ==
Destiny Church follows a Charismatic and Apostolic interpretation of Biblical principles. Its membership is predominantly Antillians from the island of Curaçao.

== Development ==
Destiny Church started with a membership of 17 people and within three years had grown to 600. Destiny Church has a network of 10 churches in the Netherlands, Aruba, Brazil, Italy, Portugal, Mexico and Rwanda. The church provides religious guidance and a range of social services such as homework groups, help in choosing schools, and helping young women who have been abused for prostitution.

From 1994 to 2005 Destiny Church was part of an apostolic organisation. Since 2005 it has been autonomous.

== Characteristics and beliefs ==
Like other neo-charismatic churches, it embraces many of the doctrines and practices found within Pentecostal and Charismatic churches; however, it is not specifically aligned with either movement.

According to its webpage it is known as a Word of Faith and a dominion-minded church with a New Apostolic Reformation church structure. This mixture of beliefs and theology is very common in neo-charismatic churches.
