= Destiny (play-by-mail game) =

Play-by-mail game

Destiny is a play-by-mail game published by Blue Panther Enterprises.

== Gameplay ==
Destiny is a science fiction play-by-mail game in which six players compete to dominate a galaxy of 225 sectors arranged in a 15x15 grid. Each begins with a single sector and must fight, negotiate, and invest strategically to expand their territory and technological prowess. Every sector offers industrial potential, ship production, and valuable investment points, which players use to boost either production or technological level. There are three tech tiers, each unlocking new race-specific advantages. Players craft their own alien race at the game's start, describing its psychological and physical traits, which the moderator interprets into game stats—covering attributes like intelligence, physical strength, and adaptability. This customization deepens immersion, especially during first-contact moments, where encounters are narrated uniquely based on both races’ profiles. Diplomacy and balance are central to gameplay, but the small player count makes each participant's presence critical—any dropouts risk destabilizing the map. The ultimate goal is not just numerical conquest, but control of half the galaxy's territory, adding a strategic layer to expansion.

== Reception ==
Stewart Wieck reviewed Destiny in White Wolf #16 (June/July, 1989), rating it a 3 out of 5 and stated that "the company is very responsive to those who play Destiny and the company is constantly making improvements in the game."

== Reviews ==
- Paper Mayhem
- Who's Who Among Play-By-Mail-Gamers
