= Warr Acres (band) =

- Also known as: VMusic
- Origin: Warr Acres, Oklahoma, U.S.
- Genres: CCM, praise & worship, pop rock
- Years active: 2005–present
- Label: DREAM
- Members: Aubrey Huffman, Lael Ewing (nee Louthan), Chris Crow, Oscar Ortiz
- Past members: Matt Payne, Kristy Starling, Jaron Nix
- Website: warracres.tv

Warr Acres (formerly known as VMusic) is a contemporary worship music band from Warr Acres, Oklahoma. They are on the DREAM Records label, which they released their first studio album on August 23, 2011, entitled Warr Acres, and their second studio LP called Hope Will Rise on October 29, 2013.

== Background ==
Warr Acres formerly called VMusic are from Warr Acres, Oklahoma, and their home church is Victory Church in Oklahoma City.

== Music ==
In 2011, the band were signed to DREAM Records, which is an independent Christian music label in the United States.

=== Independent albums ===
As VMusic, they released six independent albums starting with 2005's Unfold, 2006's Resonation, 2007's Displegar and Wait, 2009's Altísima Adoración and Fixed On You.

=== Studio albums ===
The band released their eponymously titled first studio album Warr Acres on August 23, 2011. It saw success on the Billboard 200 and Christian Albums charts at numbers 166 and 8, respectively. In addition, it placed at number 19 on the Independent Albums chart.

Their second album, Hope Will Rise did better on the charts: Released on October 29, 2013, Hope Will Rise peaked at number 118 on the Billboard 200 and number 6 on the Christian Albums chart.

== Members ==
Current members

- Aubrey Huffman – vocals
- Lael Ewing (née Louthan) – vocals
- Chris Crow – keys and vocals
- Oscar Ortiz - vocals
- Jaron Nix – electric guitar

Former members

- Matt Payne – bass guitar and vocals
- Kristy Starling – vocals

== Discography ==
=== Studio albums ===
List of studio albums, with selected chart positions
Title	Album details	Peak chart positions	
Title	Album details	US 200	US CHR
Warr Acres	Released: August 23, 2011; Label: DREAM Records; CD, digital download	166	8
Hope Will Rise	Released: October 29, 2013; Label: DREAM; CD, digital download	118	6
Future	Released: August 18, 2015; Label: DREAM Records; CD, digital download		
