= Spunsugar =

- Origin: Malmö, Sweden
- Genres: Shoegaze; alternative rock
- Years active: 2018–present
- Labels: Adrian Recordings
- Members: Cordelia Moreau; Elin Ramstedt; Felix Sjöström
- Website: spunsugar.bandcamp.com

Spunsugar is a shoegaze band from Malmö, Sweden. It consists of band members Cordelia Moreau, Elin Ramstedt and Felix Sjöström. The trio describes themselves as 'an alternative rock band with shoegaze influences'. Their music has a higher tempo than that of their peer shoegazing bands. The room for guitar riffs and the use of a drum machine further define their sound.

The band's first EP, Mouth Full Of You was released in 2019. In 2020 they released their first album, called Drive-Through Chapel.

== History ==
Cordelia Moreau and Elin Ramstedt met each other at the age of thirteen in the village they grew up in. They both had their own music preferences. Cordelia liked twee pop, jangle and grunge. Elin mainly listened to heavy metal, hardcore and post-rock. Together they discovered a shared love for shoegaze, noise rock and dream pop. At the age of fifteen, Cordelia and Elin started a four-member band. Elin was the lead vocalist and played guitar. Cordelia played the drums. They played mostly in youth clubs at the time. The group eventually disbanded, but Cordelia and Elin kept writing songs together for a while.

After a five-year hiatus, the two women found each other again in the city of Malmö. In 2018 they recorded two lo-fi songs at Cordelia's student flat. They shared the resulting demo with Felix Sjöström, a classmate of Cordelia. Shortly after Felix joined the two of them as their bass player. Under the name Spunsugar they wrote songs and played at smaller venues for a year. In 2019 they signed with record label Adrian Recordings. That same year their first EP, Mouth Full Of You, got released. The band followed this up in 2020 with their first full-length album, titled Drive-Through Chapel.

Due to the COVID-19 pandemic the band was unable to tour after their debut album released. They instead decided to spend time writing new music. This resulted in material for a new EP, Things That I Confuse, which the band released in the fall of 2021. The song Rodan was released before the EP as a single.

== Sound ==
Spunsugar combines the dense texture of shoegaze with the depressing and pulsating character of post-punk. The band draws their inspiration from the wider British underground music of the '70s, '80s and early '90s. Clear influences are the jarring shoegaze of My Bloody Valentine, the gothic rock of The Cure, and the droning and bleakness of Joy Division. These darker elements and the cold, industrial instrumentation are contrasted with clear harmonies and the angelic singing of Elin Ramstedt. It produces a mixture that reminds of bands like Chromatics and Cocteau Twins.

The songs by Spunsugar do have a higher tempo than the usual shoegazing. The room given to guitar riffs and the presence of a drum machine also define their sound. The result is a synthesis of electronic and rock music. These characteristics put Spunsugar at somewhat of a remove from classical shoegaze bands like Cocteau Twins or Slowdive. The incorporation of styles like grunge and noise, as well as the electronic influences, place the band closer to acts like Curve, Swervedriver and Ringo Deathstarr.

Their next EP, Things That I Confuse, was described by the band as 'dressed-down' and incorporating metal and country influences.

== Discography ==
Studio albums

- Drive-Through Chapel (2020, Adrian Recordings)

EPs

- Mouth Full Of You (2019, Adrian Recordings)
- Things That I Confuse (2021, Adrian Recordings)

Singles

- Native Tongue (2020, Adrian Recordings)
- I Shouldn't Care (2020, Adrian Recordings)
- Happier Happyless (2020, Adrian Recordings)
- (You Never) Turn Around (2021, Adrian Recordings)
- Rodan (2021, Adrian Recordings)
