= Jim Brickman =

American composer, recording artist (born 1961)

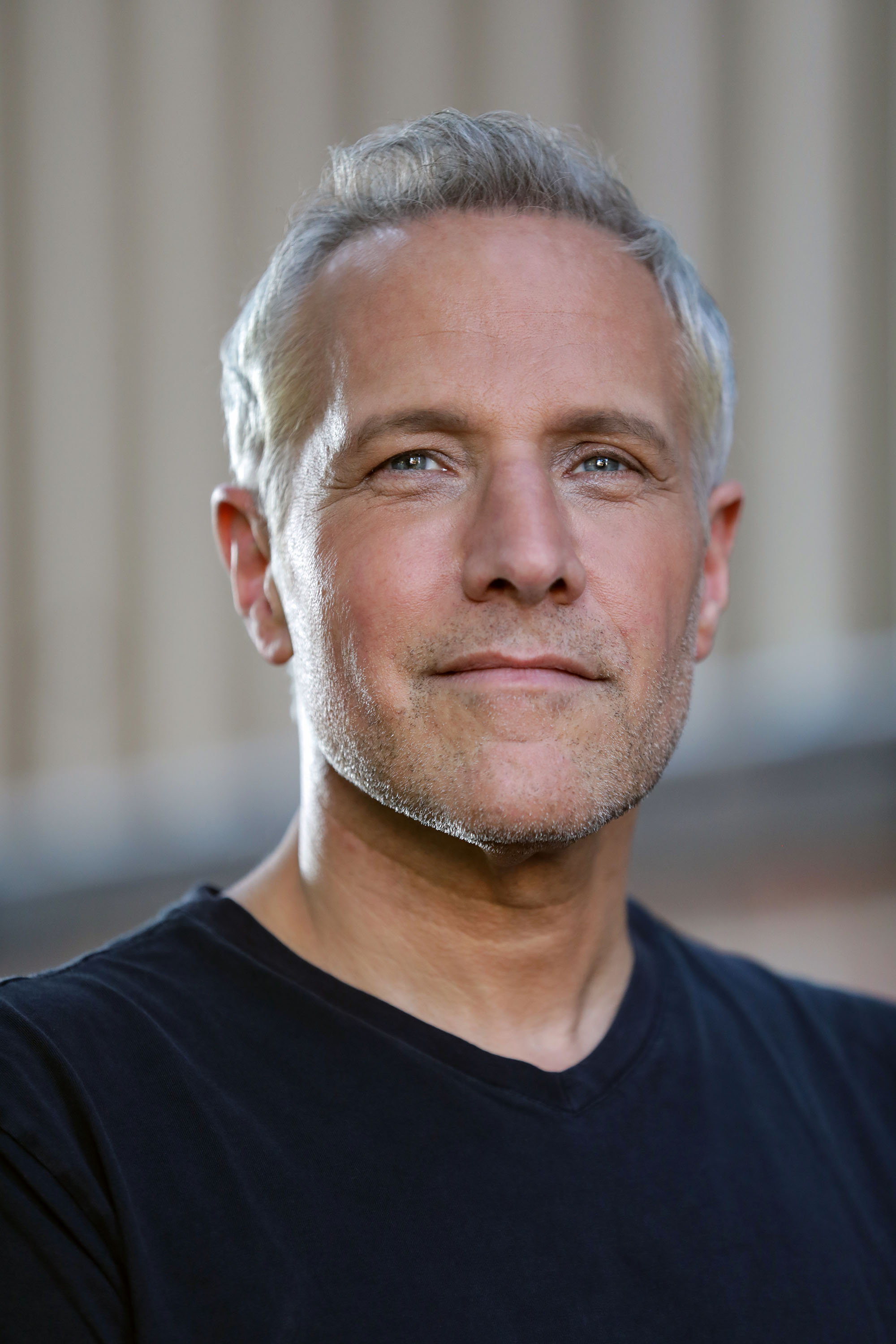

Background information
- Born: James Merrill Brickman; November 20, 1961 (age 64)
- Origin: Cleveland, Ohio, U.S.
- Genres: Pop, new age
- Occupations: Songwriter, pianist, recording artist, radio host
- Instruments: Piano, vocals
- Years active: 1994–present
- Labels: BMG/Windham Hill, Savoy Label Group, Brickhouse, Mood Entertainment
- Website: jimbrickman.com

James Merrill Brickman (born November 20, 1961) is an American pop songwriter, pianist and radio host. Brickman has earned two Grammy nominations for his albums Peace (2003) for Best Instrumental, and Faith (2009) for Best New Age Album. He won a Canadian Country Music Award, a Dove Award presented by the Gospel Music Association, and was twice named Songwriter of the Year by SESAC. Billboard lists 22 of his albums reaching No. 1 on the New Age chart, and 16 of his songs reaching Top 10 on the Adult Contemporary chart. Four of his albums were certified Gold by the Recording Industry Association of America (RIAA).

Since 1997, he has hosted his own radio show, The Jim Brickman Show, which is carried on radio stations throughout the United States.

Brickman has collaborated with Lady A, Johnny Mathis, Kenny Rogers, Michael W. Smith, Leslie Odom Jr., Martina McBride, Megan Hilty, Donny Osmond, Delta Goodrem, Olivia Newton-John, Carly Simon, John Oates, Five for Fighting, Michael Bolton, Gerald Levert, Jane Krakowski, Richie McDonald, Sandi Patty, Mat & Savanna Shaw, and many others.

== Early life ==
Brickman was born and raised in Shaker Heights, Ohio, and began playing piano at the age of five. His Jewish parents took him to services at Suburban Temple-Kol Ami in nearby Beachwood, where Brickman was confirmed in his teens. He attended Shaker Heights High School, and he performed on piano with the high school orchestra. He heard fellow student Anne Cochran sing in a musical, and introduced himself, asking her to join him in performing piano-vocal material. Together, they won a talent competition hosted by the WGCL "G98" radio station. Another high school friend named Meg Tippett convinced Brickman to join the Heights Youth Theatre as accompanist, which grew into four years as musical director.

Brickman studied composition and performance at the Cleveland Institute of Music while taking business classes at Case Western Reserve University. In 1980, Brickman founded his own advertising music company called The Brickman Arrangement, writing commercial jingles for many companies across the country such as McDonald's, Pontiac, City of Cleveland, Ohio Lottery, and Isuzu.

== Musical career ==
Brickman signed to Windham Hill Records in 1994 and released his first album, No Words featuring the song "Rocket to the Moon" which became his first solo instrumental to be ranked on the Billboard charts. The songs "Angel Eyes" and "If You Believe" gained radio airplay from Brickman's second release, By Heart on the Windham Hill label in 1995. The following year, the CD's title track, "By Heart", became his first top 20 adult contemporary (AC) hit. In 1997, Brickman released the album Picture This, adding a vocal performance, "Valentine", sung by Martina McBride. By the end of the year, Brickman issued the first of many Christmas CDs, The Gift, with the title song featuring Collin Raye and Susan Ashton, topping three different charts; for this album, Brickman received a Dove Award from the Gospel Music Association. He later produced several other Christmas-themed albums, Peace (2003), Christmas Romance (2006), Homecoming (2007), and The Hymns and Carols of Christmas (2008); and his two albums Grace (2005) and Faith (2008) concentrated on arrangements of well-known Christian music.

During his career, four albums have sold over 500,000 copies; By Heart (1995), Picture This (1997), The Gift (1997), and Destiny (1999), qualifying them as Gold records in the United States. In November 2005, three of Brickman's albums, The Disney Songbook (2005), Grace (2005) and Greatest Hits (2004), held the top three spots on Billboard's New Age chart. He also received a Grammy nomination in 2003, an SESAC "Songwriter of the Year" award, and a Canadian Country Music Award for "Best Vocal/Instrumental Collaboration". The 2008 album Faith was nominated for the 2009 Grammy Award for Best New Age Album.

Brickman composes a variety of music, and is known for his success in radio's adult contemporary format. He has collaborated with artists from all genres with songs like "Love of My Life" with Michael W. Smith, "You" with Jane Krakowski, "Never Alone" with country group Lady A, "After All These Years" with Anne Cochran, and "Never Far Away" with Christian contemporary group Rush of Fools, among others. Because of his long association with Windham Hill, his work is sometimes classified in the new-age genre, although Brickman considers his style to be broader than that. In May 2006, Brickman left Windham Hill and signed with Savoy Label Group (SLG) to release music under his own Brickman Music Group imprint. The album Escape was his first release distributed by SLG, following Pure Jim Brickman, a career-spanning compilation from Windham Hill.

In 2015, Brickman released the first album in the Soothe series for relaxation, meditation, yoga and massage. Soothe, Vol. 1 came with an audiobook. Three more volumes in the series followed through 2019.

== Radio show ==
Making its debut in January 1997, Your Weekend with Jim Brickman is a four-hour radio show that has been heard across the US featuring music blended with celebrity interviews, lifestyle features and entertainment reports.

In 2018, The Jim Brickman Show Podcast debuted on Pandora. Two years later, his podcast moved to Spotify as The Brickman Bedtime Story.

== Television ==
Brickman filmed the PBS specials My Romance: An Evening with Jim Brickman (2000), Love Songs & Lullabies (2002), The Disney Songbook (2005), and Beautiful World (2009). He has appeared on various TV shows such as Good Morning America and Live with Regis and Kathie Lee.

== Personal life ==
Brickman grew up in Cleveland. He has a residence there as well as in New York City.

== Other media ==
Brickman composed the 1996 Fred Meyer grocery advertising jingle, “What’s On Your List Today?”

Brickman appeared on the September–October 2013 cover of Making Music Magazine to discuss his life and career.

== Brickhouse Direct ==
Brickman founded Brickhouse Direct (BHD) in 2003 to provide internet marketing and e-commerce solutions. They specialized in promoting new acts and reinvigorating the careers of veteran musicians. In 2005, Brickhouse bought the online marketing firm Viawerk, bringing Viawerk co-founder Rod Flauhaus on board as partner. Flauhaus co-wrote the album Homecoming. Brickman's younger brother Michael served as president of Brickhouse. Brickhouse marketing clients included, Amy Grant, Michael W. Smith, Richie McDonald (Lonestar), Point of Grace and many others. The label also published works by saxophonist Dave Koz, comedian Anita Renfroe, singer Chris Sligh and singer Mark Masri. Brickman's own 2012 album Blessings was released on the Brickhouse Direct label.

== Discography ==
=== Albums ===
Year	Album	Chart position			RIAA	Record label
Year	Album	Billboard 200	New Age	CAN Country	RIAA	Record label
1994	No Words	—	13	—	—	Windham Hill
1995	By Heart	187	3	—	Gold	Windham Hill
1997	Picture This	30	1	—	Gold	Windham Hill
1997	The Gift	48	1	19	Gold	Windham Hill
1998	Visions of Love	170	—	—	—	Windham Hill
1999	Destiny	42	1	—	Gold	Windham Hill
1999	If You Believe	—	2	—	—	Windham Hill
1999	My Romance	75	1	—	—	Windham Hill
2001	Simple Things	54	2	—	—	Windham Hill
2002	Love Songs and Lullabies	73	1	—	—	Windham Hill
2002	Valentine	—	—	—	—	Windham Hill
2003	Peace	87	1	—	—	Windham Hill
2004	Greatest Hits	134	1	—	—	Windham Hill
2005	Grace	88	1	—	—	Windham Hill
2005	The Disney Songbook	142	1	—	—	Walt Disney Records
2006	Pure Jim Brickman	—	2	—	—	Windham Hill
2006	Escape	105	1	—	—	Savoy Label Group
2006	Christmas Romance	—	—	—	—	Compass Records
2007	Homecoming	96	1	—	—	SLG
2007	Hope	—	—	—	—	Compass Records
2008	Valentine Reissue	—	1	—	—	Savoy Label Group
2008	Unspoken	199	1	—	—	Savoy Label Group
2008	Ultimate Love Songs	—	2	—	—	Time Life
2008	The Hymns and Carols of Christmas	—	4	—	—	Green Hill
2008	Faith	—	—	—	—	Compass Productions
2009	Beautiful World	89	1	—	—	Somerset Entertainment
2009	Joy	85	1	—	—	Compass Productions (Target), Somerset
2010	Home	—	2	—	—	Somerset Entertainment
2010	Love	141	1	—	—	Somerset Entertainment
2011	Yesterday Once More: A Tribute to the Music of the Carpenters	—	6	—	—	Green Hill
2011	All Is Calm: Peaceful Christmas Hymns	84	1	—	—	Somerset Entertainment
2011	Romanza	—	1	—	—	Somerset Entertainment
2012	Believe	—	2	—	—	Mood Entertainment
2012	Piano Lullabies	—	4	—	—	Mood Entertainment
2013	The Magic of Christmas	58	1	—	—	Somerset Entertainment
2013	Love 2	—	2	—	—	Somerset Entertainment
2014	Blessed: Songs of Inspiration	—	—	—	—	Mood Entertainment
2014	Pure Worship	—	6	—	—	Green Hill
2014	On a Winter's Night: The Songs and Spirit of Christmas	—	2	—	—	Green Hill
2015	Pure Romance	—	2	—	—	Green Hill
2015	Soothe, Volume 1: Music to Quiet Your Mind and Soothe Your World	—	1	—	—	Brickman Music
2016	Pure Cinema	—	3	—	—	Green Hill
2016	Freedom Rings: Solo Piano	—	2	—	—	Brickman Music
2016	Soothe, Volume 2: Sleep - Music for Tranquil Slumber	—	1	—	—	Valley Entertainment
2017	Wedding Songs	—	6	—	—	Brickman Music
2017	Soothe, Volume 3: Meditation - Music for Peaceful Relaxation	—	6	—	—	Valley Entertainment
2017	A Joyful Christmas	—	2	—	—	BMG
2018	Soothe, Volume 4: Subzero - Sounds That Spark the Senses	—	1	—	—	Odeon Records
2018	8: Just Breathe	—	—	—	—	Odeon Records Limited
2019	Soothe, Volume 5: Lullaby Dreams - Music for a Peaceful Escape	—	—	—	—	Odeon Records Limited
2019	Underground	—	—	—	—	Odeon Records Limited
2019	A Christmas Celebration	—	2	—	—	Green Hill
2019	Pure Carpenters	—	9	—	—	Brickman Music/Green Hill Productions
2020	Interstellar	—	—	—	—	Odeon Records Limited
2020	25th Anniversary: Greatest Hits		—			Brickman Music/Green Hill Productions
2020	Bossa	—	—	—	—	Odeon Records Limited
2020	Bedtime Story	—	—	—	—	Brickman Music/Green Hill Productions
2020	Soothe - A Cinematic Soundtrack: Music to Unwind and Take You Away	—	—	—	—	Brickman Music/Green Hill Productions
2020	Soothe, Volume 6: Christmas - Music for a Peaceful Holiday	—	—	—	—	Brickman Music/Green Hill Productions
2021	Brickman on Broadway	—	—	—	—	Brickman Music/Green Hill Productions
2021	88: Solo Piano Sessions	—	—	—	—	Brickman Music/Green Hill Productions
2021	Jim Brickman's Piano Bar: 30 Love Songs of the 50s & 60s	—	—	—	—	Brickman Music/Green Hill Productions
2021	Bedtime Story: Volumes 2 & 3	—	—	—	—	Brickman Music/Green Hill Productions
2021	Soothe, Volume 7: Prayer - Music for a Peaceful Soul	—	—	—	—	Brickman Music/Green Hill Productions
2021	The Ultimate Christmas Playlist	—	—	—	—	Brickman Music/Green Hill Productions
2021	A Christmas Symphony	—	—	—	—	Brickman Music/Green Hill Productions
2022	Bedtime Story: Volumes 4 & 5	—	—	—	—	Brickman Music/Green Hill Productions
2022	Disney on Piano: The Disney Songbook Vol. 2	—	—	—	—	Brickman Music/Green Hill Productions
2022	A Very Merry Christmas	—	—	—	—	Brickman Music/Green Hill Productions
2023	Brickman Across America: Heart & Soul of American Music	—	—	—	—	Brickman Distributed
2023	Soothe Sailing: Brickman Plays Yacht Rock - Volume 1	—	—	—	—	Brickman Distributed
2023	The Look of Love: Brickman Plays Bacharach	—	—	—	—	Brickman Distributed
2023	Brickman Sings Christmas	—	—	—	—	Brickman Distributed
2024	Because You Loved Me: Diane Warren Re-Im	—	—	—	—	Jim Brickman
2024	Music from the Magic Kingdom: The Disney Songbook - Volume 3	—	—	—	—	Brickman Distributed
2024	Brickman Across America: Heart & Soul of American Music - Volume 2	—	—	—	—	Brickman Distributed
2024	Comfort & Joy: An Old Fashioned Christmas - Volume 2	—	—	—	—	Brickman Distributed
2025	Soothe: Endel Sleep Soundscape	—	—	—	—	Emeraldwave by Green Hill
2025	Soothe, Volume 8: Summer Yoga	—	—	—	—	Brickhouse Records & Tapes
2025	Soothe Sailing: Brickman Plays Yacht Rock - Volume 2	—	—	—	—	Brickhouse Records & Tapes
2025	The Gift of Christmas Around the World	—	—	—	—	Brickhouse Records & Tapes
2026	Soothe, Volume 9: Latin	—	—	—	—	Brickhouse Records & Tapes
"—" denotes releases that failed to chart, not released, or not certified

=== Singles ===
Year	Title	Peak chart position						Album
Year	Title	US	US AC	US Country	CAN	CAN AC	CAN Country	Album
1996	"By Heart" (with Laura Creamer)	—	16	—	—	—	—	By Heart: Piano Solos
1996	"If You Believe"	—	36	—	—	—	—	By Heart: Piano Solos
1996	"Angel Eyes"	—	37	—	—	—	—	By Heart: Piano Solos
1996	"Hero's Dream"	—	24	—	—	—	—	Picture This
1997	"Valentine" (with Martina McBride)^{A}	50	3	53	—	16	—	Picture This
1997	"Picture This"	—	23	—	—	—	—	Picture This
1997	"Your Love" (with Michelle Wright)	—	—	74	42	16	15	Visions of Love
1997	"The Gift" (with Collin Raye and Susan Ashton)^{B}	—	3	51	—	—	52	The Gift / Visions of Love
1998	"After All These Years" (with Anne Cochran)	—	8	—	—	18	—	Visions of Love
1998	"Valentine" (with Martina McBride; re-release)^{A}	—	—	9	—	—	14	Evolution (Martina McBride album)
1999	"Love of My Life" (with Michael W. Smith)	—	9	—	—	—	—	Destiny
1999	"Destiny" (with Jordan Hill and Billy Porter)	—	10	—	—	10	—	Destiny
1999	"Your Love" (with Michelle Wright; re-release)	—	19	74	—	—	—	Visions of Love
2000	"The Love I Found in You" (with Dave Koz)	—	15	—	—	84	—	My Romance: An Evening with Jim Brickman
2001	"Simple Things" (with Rebecca Lynn Howard)	—	1	—	—	—	—	Simple Things
2002	"A Mother's Day"	—	18	—	—	—	—	Simple Things
2002	"You" (with Jane Krakowski)	—	4	—	—	—	—	Love Songs and Lullabies
2003	"Peace (Where the Heart Is)" (with Collin Raye and Susan Ashton)	—	15	—	—	—	—	Peace
2003	"Sending You a Little Christmas" (with Kristy Starling)^{C}	—	1	—	—	—	—	Peace
2004	"Til I See You Again" (with Mark Schultz)	—	21	—	—	—	—	Greatest Hits
2004	"My Love Is Here" (with Roch Voisine)	—	21	—	—	9	—	Greatest Hits
2005	"I'm Amazed" (with Lila McCann)	—	—	59	—	—	—	The Disney Songbook
2005	"You" (rerecording with Tara MacLean)	—	32	—	—	—	—	Valentine
2005	"Hear Me (Tears into Wine)" (with Michael Bolton)	—	20	—	—	—	—	Grace
2005	"Beautiful" (with Wayne Brady)	—	2	—	—	—	—	The Disney Songbook
2006	"Hideaway (When It Snows)" (with Geoff Byrd)	—	3	—	—	—	—	Escape
2007	"Escape" (with Marc Antoine)^{D}	—	—	—	—	—	—	Escape
2007	"Never Alone" (with Lady Antebellum)	—	14	—	—	—	—	Escape and Never Alone (single)
2007	"Coming Home for Christmas" (with Richie McDonald)	—	4	—	—	—	—	Homecoming
2008	"Christmas Is" (with Mark Masri)	—	3	—	—	—	—	The Hymns & Carols of Christmas
2009	"Never Far Away" (with Rush of Fools)	—	11	—	—	—	—	Wonder of the World (Rush of Fools album)
2009	"Beautiful World (We're All Here)" (with Adam Crossley)	—	4	—	95	7	—	Beautiful World
2010	"Thank You" (with Matt Giraud)	—	16	—	—	—	—	Home
2011	"Fa La La" (with Olivia Jade Archbold)	—	2	—	—	—	—	Holiday Radio Sampler (promotional CD)
2012	"Good Morning Beautiful" (with Luke McMaster)^{E}	—	3	—	—	—	—	All Roads (Luke McMaster album)
2013	"Sending You a Little Christmas" (with Johnny Mathis)	—	4	—	—	—	—	Sending You a Little Christmas (Johnny Mathis album)
2014	"Night Before Christmas" (with John Oates)	—	5	—	—	—	—	On a Winter's Night: The Songs and Spirit of Christmas
2014	"That Silent Night" (with Kenny Rogers)	—	25	—	—	—	—	On a Winter's Night: The Songs and Spirit of Christmas
2015	"Hitch a Ride with Santa" (with Charlie Alan)	—	22	—	—	—	—	Comfort & Joy (The Sweet Sounds of Christmas)
2016	"A Little Bit of Christmas" (with Kris Allen)	—	26	—	—	—	—	Comfort & Joy (The Sweet Sounds of Christmas)
2017	"Christmas Where You Are" (with Five for Fighting)	—	11	—	—	—	—	A Joyful Christmas
2018	"Poolside Chill (Super Chilled Lo-Fi Remix)"	—	—	—	—	—	—	Non-album single
2019	"Feliz Navidad" (with Kathy Phillips)	—	28	—	—	—	—	A Christmas Celebration
2019	"My Love Is Here" (rerecording)	—	—	—	—	—	—	Non-album singles
2019	"The Water Is Wide"	—	—	—	—	—	—	Non-album singles
2019	"Brahms' Lullaby"	—	—	—	—	—	—	Soothe Volume 5 - Lullaby Dreams
2019	"Funky Flute (Super Chilled Lo-Fi Remix)"	—	—	—	—	—	—	Non-album singles
2019	"Permafrost (Super Chilled Lo-Fi Remix)"	—	—	—	—	—	—	Non-album singles
2019	"Noites Magica"	—	—	—	—	—	—	Bossa
2019	"The Gift" (with Kerrnie)	—	—	—	—	—	—	Non-album single
2019	"Beyond the Atomosphere" (with Chris Phillips)	—	—	—	—	—	—	Interstellar
2020	"What the World Needs Now Is Love"	—	—	—	—	—	—	Bossa
2020	"So Far Away"	—	—	—	—	—	—	Piano Tributes: Songs of Carole King
2020	"Americana"	—	—	—	—	—	—	Soothe - A Cinematic Soundtrack: Music to Unwind and Take You Away
2020	"Here Comes the Sun"	—	—	—	—	—	—	Non-album singles
2020	"Never Alone" (with Erin Kinsey)	—	—	—	—	—	—	Non-album singles
2020	"Sunshine on My Shoulders"	—	—	—	—	—	—	Non-album singles
2020	"Embraceable You"	—	—	—	—	—	—	Jim Brickman's American Songbook Collection: The Music of George Gershwin
2020	"Winter Waltz (2020 Version)"	—	—	—	—	—	—	Soothe, Volume 6: Christmas - Music for a Peaceful Holiday
2020	"I'll Be Home for Christmas"	—	—	—	—	—	—	Soothe, Volume 6: Christmas - Music for a Peaceful Holiday
2020	"Fa La La, HO HO HO" (with Luke McMaster)	—	22	—	—	—	—	Non-album single
2021	"Discover"	—	—	—	—	—	—	88: Solo Piano Sessions
2021	"Together"	—	—	—	—	—	—	88: Solo Piano Sessions
2021	"Sweet Hour of Prayer"	—	—	—	—	—	—	Soothe, Volume 7: Prayer - Music for a Peaceful Soul
2021	"Slow Down Christmas" (with Peter Cincotti)	—	—	—	—	—	—	Non-album singles
2022	"Valentine (25th Anniversary Remix)" (with Olivia Newton-John)	—	—	—	—	—	—	Non-album singles
2022	"You'll Be in My Heart"	—	—	—	—	—	—	Disney on Piano: The Disney Songbook Vol. 2
2022	"How Far I'll Go"	—	—	—	—	—	—	Disney on Piano: The Disney Songbook Vol. 2
2022	"A Taste of Snow"	—	—	—	—	—	—	A Very Merry Christmas
2022	"Peace Joy Love" (featuring Ukrainian Chorus Dumka NY with Haley & Michaels and Mat & Savanna Shaw)	—	—	—	—	—	—	Non-album singles
2022	"The Gift" (with Sarah Geronimo and Matteo Guidicelli)	—	—	—	—	—	—	Non-album singles
2022	"A La Nanita Nana" (with Carolina Gaitán)	—	—	—	—	—	—	Non-album singles
2024	"My Dream" (with Olivia Newton-John and Il Volo)	—	—	—	—	—	—	Non-album singles
2024	"Slow Down Christmas" (with Ruben Studdard)	—	—	—	—	—	—	Comfort & Joy: An Old Fashioned Christmas - Volume 2
2025	"Valentine" (with Haley & Michaels)	—	—	—	—	—	—	Non-album singles
2025	"Wind Beneath My Wings" (with Mat & Savanna Shaw and One Voice Children's Choir)	—	—	—	—	—	—	Non-album singles
2025	"Giving It all (to You)" (with Haley & Michaels)	—	—	—	—	—	—	Non-album singles
2025	"It's You" (with Ruben Studdard)	—	—	—	—	—	—	Non-album singles
2025	"Where's the Good in Goodbye" (with Ruben Studdard)	—	—	—	—	—	—	Non-album singles
2025	"Mele Kalikimaka"	—	—	—	—	—	—	The Gift of Christmas Around the World
2025	"White Christmas"	—	—	—	—	—	—	The Gift of Christmas Around the World
2025	"Feels Like You (Piano Version)"	—	—	—	—	—	—	Non-album single
2026	"Felicidade"	—	—	—	—	—	—	Soothe, Volume 9: Latin
2026	"I Need You More" (with Hayley Bishop)	—	30	—	—	—	—	Amazing Grace
"—" denotes releases that failed to chart or not released

- ^{A} "Valentine" was originally only released to Adult Contemporary and charted on Hot Country Songs as an album cut. It was remixed and released to country radio the following year.
- ^{B} "The Gift" was not eligible to enter the Billboard Hot 100, but instead peaked No. 65 on the Billboard Hot 100 Airplay.
- ^{C} "Sending You a Little Christmas" also peaked at No. 15 on Hot Christian Songs.
- ^{D} "Escape" peaked at No. 17 on Hot Contemporary Jazz Songs.
- ^{E} A Christmas version of "Good Morning Beautiful" was released later in 2012 titled "Merry Christmas Beautiful".

=== Music videos ===
Year	Video	Director
1997	"Valentine" (with Martina McBride)	Alan Glazen, Ron Goldfarb, Ted Zbozion
1997	"Your Love" (with Michelle Wright)	David Safian
1997	"The Gift" (with Susan Ashton and Collin Raye)	Norry Niven
2007	"Never Alone" (with Lady Antebellum)	Glenn Sweitzer
2007	"Coming Home for Christmas" (with Richie McDonald)	Glenn Sweitzer
2012	"Good Morning Beautiful" (with Luke McMaster)	George Tsioutsioulas

== Awards ==
- 1998 – Canadian Country Music Association Award, Vocal Collaboration of the Year, for "Your Love" with Michelle Wright
- 1998 – Dove Award presented by the Gospel Music Association for "The Gift" with Collin Raye and Susan Ashton
- 1998 – SESAC Songwriter of the Year
- 1999 – SESAC Songwriter of the Year
- 2002 – SESAC: Performance award, for Simple Things
- 2003 – SESAC: New Adult Contemporary album, for Love Songs and Lullabies
- 2003 – Grammy nomination for Best Pop Instrumental Album, for Peace
- 2009 – Grammy nomination for Best New Age Album, for Faith
