= Your Love (Jim Brickman song) =

- Holiday cover version

Single by Jim Brickman

from the album Visions of Love
- Released: 1997
- Genre: Country pop
- Length: 3:46
- Label: Windham Hill
- Songwriters: Jim Brickman; Dane Deviller; Sean Hosein
- Producers: Jim Brickman; David Pringle

Jim Brickman singles chronology
"Picture This" (1997)	"Your Love" (1997)	"The Gift" (1997)

Music video
- "Your Love" on YouTube

"Your Love" is a song co-written and performed by American recording artist Jim Brickman, with guest singer Michelle Wright. It was released in 1997 on Windham Hill Records as the lead single and as well as the sixth track from his debut compilation album, Visions of Love (1998). It is a country pop song that was written by Dane Deviller, Sean Hosein and Jim Brickman and produced by the latter and by David Pringle.

== Charts ==
Chart (1998)	Peak position
Canada Top Singles (RPM)	42
Canada Adult Contemporary (RPM)	16
Canada Country Singles (RPM)	15
Chart (2000)	Peak position
US Adult Contemporary (Billboard)	19
US Hot Country Songs (Billboard)	74
