= Destiny (DJ Sabrina the Teenage DJ album) =

Studio album by DJ Sabrina the Teenage DJ
- Released: 13 August 2023
- Genre: Plunderphonics
- Length: 236:00; 98:40 (abridged version)
- Label: Spells on the Telly
- Producer: DJ Sabrina

DJ Sabrina the Teenage DJ chronology
Bewitched! (2022)	Destiny (2023)	Hex (2024)

Destiny is an album by London-based electronic music producer DJ Sabrina the Teenage DJ, released on 13 August 2023 through Spells on the Telly.

== Critical reception ==
Professional ratings
Review scores
Source	Rating
Pitchfork	7.9/10

Hattie Lindert of Pitchfork described Destiny as a "radiant, elastic, nearly four-hour celebration of the transportive possibilities of dance music" and remarked that "daunting as its length may appear, Destiny is less an Odyssey than a 'most romantic moments' YouTube compilation: easy to dip in and out of, because the payoffs just keep coming". Stereogum named it their "Album of the Week" on 15 August 2023, with Chris DeVille writing that it is "an extreme spin on the trope of a record you can get lost in" with music "designed to work best as a backdrop for some other activity, whether that means lighting up a party or carrying you through a night in front of a computer monitor. Think of it as Since I Left You for the 'beats to study/relax to' era".

== Track listing ==
Destiny track listing
No.	Title	Length
1.	"Honey"	8:17
2.	"The Rhythm"	1:02
3.	"Destiny Begins"	1:13
4.	"Brave"	4:06
5.	"For Now and Forever"	7:51
6.	"Garden Party"	5:02
7.	"Got 2 B"	6:04
8.	"It's Still Me"	6:39
9.	"Something New"	6:13
10.	"Because Love"	7:12
11.	"Get Over It"	6:04
12.	"Will U B Mine"	5:32
13.	"I'll Always Be There"	6:18
14.	"I'm Giving You Up"	6:56
15.	"Destiny"	5:29
16.	"Invincible (Something to Hold On To)"	6:40
17.	"The End"	4:37
18.	"I'm Taken"	6:06
19.	"My Own"	4:18
20.	"He's My Baby"	6:40
21.	"Out of Nothing"	6:10
22.	"I Just Wanna Be with You"	7:55
23.	"I Know It's Stupid"	6:26
24.	"Vibrations"	5:23
25.	"DestiNY FM"	1:43
26.	"Dance Now"	8:54
27.	"Over You"	8:31
28.	"It Happened to Me"	6:47
29.	"Stay"	5:35
30.	"Doubts"	6:37
31.	"Actions Speak Louder"	6:53
32.	"Hey, It's Gonna Be Okay"	6:15
33.	"Figuring It Out"	4:53
34.	"All I Can Feel"	7:44
35.	"Who's Your Favorite Artist?"	0:22
36.	"Bewitched"	6:00
37.	"Destined"	2:47
38.	"Some Kind of Destiny"	5:34
39.	"Without Crying/Without Hiding"	9:45
40.	"Slowdown (It's Never Too Late)"	9:06
41.	"Yenoh"	0:46
Total length:		236:00

A September 2023 re-release of the album titled Destiny (Singles) edited the lengths of many of the tracks and combined "The Rhythm" and "Destiny Begins" together for a total of 40 tracks.
