= Hessa (name) =

- Gender: Feminine
- Language: Arabic

Origin
- Meaning: Pearl
- Region of origin: Arabian Peninsula

Other names
- Alternative spelling: Hessah, Hussa, Hassa

Hessa (Arabic: حصـة) is an Arabic feminine given name predominantly used in the Arabian Peninsula. In Gulf Arabic, the name means "pearl". However, the word Hessa also means a "portion" or "a share of something" in Arabic.

The name may refer to:

- Hessa Al-Awadi (born 1956), Qatari poet
- Hessa Al-Isa (born 1995), Bahraini footballer
- Hessa Al Jaber (born 1959), Qatari engineer and politician
- Hessa Al Muhairi, Emirati writer
- Hessa Al-Sudairy (born 1985), Saudi footballer
- Hussa bint Ahmed Al Sudairi (1900–1969), wife of King Abdulaziz of Saudi Arabia
- Hassa bint Mohammed Al Nahyan (1922–2018), wife of the founder and President of the United Arab Emirates
- Hessa bint Trad Al Shalaan, Saudi royal and the wife of King Abdullah
- Hessa bint Salman Al Khalifa (1933–2009), Bahraini queen
