= Kristy Starling =

American singer & pastor

- Origin: Oklahoma City, Oklahoma, United States
- Genre: CCM
- Occupation: Worship pastor
- Years active: 2002–present
- Label: Warner
- Website: kristystarling.com

Kristy Starling is a contemporary Christian music singer, born in Oklahoma City, Oklahoma. After marrying husband Adam Starling in late 2002, she came second in a national singing competition, Today's Superstar, NBC News' morning show. She signed to Warner Bros. Records, working with successful producer David Foster, and released her eponymous debut album on 22 April 2003, the album features a cover of LeAnn Rimes' "I Need You". This album peaked at No. 19 on Billboard's Heatseekers charts and No. 24 on its Top Contemporary Christian Albums chart. In 2005, her single "Coming Home for Christmas" peaked at No. 32 on the Adult Contemporary chart.

Kristy Starling's collaboration "Sending You a Little Christmas" with Jim Brickman was featured on Brickman's album, Peace, which was nominated for the 2004 Grammy Award for Best Pop Instrumental Album. "Sending You a Little Christmas" reached No. 1 on the Adult Contemporary Radio Charts Christmas 2003.

Starling's song, "As Long As We're Here", was released on American Idol runner up Clay Aiken's album, On My Way Here, on May 6, 2008.

Starling also has been a part of Victory Church music, known as VMusic at Victory Church in Oklahoma. In 2011, the group signed on with Dream Records and changed its name to Warr Acres based on the city in Oklahoma. Warr Acres also released a self-titled CD in 2011 that features several songs with Starling, including "Undignified", "Maker of Miracles", "Hymn of Remembrance", "Savior, Crucified" and "Hold to This Truth".

== Discography ==
Studio albums

- Kristy Starling (2003)

Warr Acres

- Warr Acres (2011)
- Hope Will Rise (2013)
