= Hope Will Rise =

Studio album by Warr Acres
- Released: October 29, 2013
- Genre: Contemporary worship music, contemporary Christian music, pop rock
- Length: 68:43
- Label: DREAM
- Producer: Chris Crow, Joe Crow, Jaron Nix

Warr Acres chronology
Warr Acres (2011)	Hope Will Rise (2013)

Hope Will Rise is the second studio album from Contemporary worship music band Warr Acres. The album released on October 29, 2013 by DREAM Records. Band members' Chris Crow and Jaron Nix produced the album alongside Joe Crow. The album met with commercial charting successes, and it has attracted positive critical attention.

== Critical reception ==
Professional ratings
Review scores
Source	Rating
Christian Music Zine	4.75/5
CM Addict	4/5 stars
Cross Rhythms	8/10 squares
Indie Vision Music	4/5 stars
Jesus Freak Hideout	3.5/5 stars
New Release Tuesday	3.5/5 stars

Hope Will Rise garnered universally positive reviews from music critics. At Allmusic, Matt Collar wrote in an unrated review that the release "features the band's anthemic, faith-based songs that mix piano, strings, and electronic flourishes with the group's rock-based sound." Marcus Burkhardt of Jesus Freak Hideout rated the album three-and-a-half stars, and claimed that the conclusion to the album to be "disappointing", which is the reason he wrote the band could still see some "improvement". In addition, Burkhardt highlighted that the offering was done heroically, which the album was done "more thoughtful and creative than much out there", and the album was "worship music with a bit of a twist." At New Release Tuesday, Jonathan Andre rated the album three-and-a-half stars, which said the album was "eclectic" compared to other worship music, and he wrote that "From some engaging pop and light rock, to danceable electronic offerings, to cinematic emotional ballads, they've managed to show themselves a talented and diverse group capable of reaching a wide audience with their unflinching Christ-centric message."

At Indie Vision Music, Jonathan Andre rated the album four stars, and said the band did a great job in crafting "an emotional, enjoyable and energetic album" on which the band have amped up their musicality and lyricism. Paul S. Ganney of Cross Rhythms rated the album an eight out of ten squares, and affirmed that the band "clearly know what they're doing", which the band are "doing it well." Furthermore, Ganney stated that the release was "really well produced, played and arranged." At Christian Music Zine, Joshua Andre rated the album 4.75-out-of-five, and exclaimed that "these gems and treasures are proof of their power to surprise us in a good way." Brianne Bellomy of CM Addict rated it four out of five, and affirmed that this was an album "to keep on hand."

== Track listing ==
Tracklist
No.	Title	Writer(s)	Length
1.	"Pulse"	Chris Crow, Oscar Lemuel, Kristy Starling	4:02
2.	"Freedom Fall" (featuring Jonathan Thulin)	Crow, Lael Ewing	3:34
3.	"Light Up the Night"	Crow	4:48
4.	"Beautifully Complete"	Ewing, Starling	4:30
5.	"The Beautiful Life"	Ewing	3:02
6.	"Hope Will Rise"	Crow, Ewing, Aubree Huffman, Emily Moore, Maggie Payne, Starling	5:35
7.	"Lovesick" (featuring Cindy Cruse-Ratcliff)	Crow, Huffman, Payne	5:30
8.	"So Much Greater"	Ewing	4:21
9.	"Come to Jesus"	Ewing	4:21
10.	"All Around"	Ewing	4:39
11.	"Psalm 27"	Crow, Ewing	7:20
12.	"Nobody Else"	Crow	5:59
13.	"Linger"	Ewing	5:20
14.	"Here at Your Feet"	Ewing	5:42
Total length:			68:43

== Charts ==
Chart (2013)	Peak position
US Billboard 200	118
US Christian Albums (Billboard)	6
