= Warr Acres (album) =

Studio album by Warr Acres
- Released: August 23, 2011
- Genre: contemporary worship music, contemporary Christian music, pop rock
- Length: 46:32
- Label: DREAM
- Producer: Chris Crow, Jaron Nix

Warr Acres chronology
Warr Acres (2011)	Hope Will Rise (2013)

Warr Acres is the debut studio album from contemporary worship music band Warr Acres. The album released on August 23, 2011 by DREAM Records. Band members' Chris Crow and Jaron Nix produced the album. The album met with commercial charting successes, and mostly mixed reviews but overall barely positive reception.

== Critical reception ==
Professional ratings
Review scores
Source	Rating
CCM Magazine	3/5 stars
Christian Music Zine	3/5 stars
Cross Rhythms	8/10 squares
Jesus Freak Hideout	3/5 stars

Warr Acres received generally mixed reviews but overall barely positive reception from music critics. Andrew Greer of CCM Magazine rated the album three stars, and stated that "Though there is nothing new here, Acres offers plenty to enjoy." At Jesus Freak Hideout, Scott Fryberger rated the album three stars, and wrote that their music is all over the map and it needs some honing in, which he noted that the band has the potential to grow and evolve to make better music. Tony Cummings of Cross Rhythms rated the album eight out of ten squares, and called the album "highly impressive". At Christian Music Zine, Tyler Hess rated it three stars, and evoked that the album was not "musical genius by any means, but at least it is a little more fun than the typical fare."

== Track listing ==
No.	Title	Writer(s)	Length
1.	"Undignified"	Chris Crow, Lael Louthan, Matt Payne, Kristy Starling	3:37
2.	"Sound the Alarm"	Louthan	4:37
3.	"You Are Joy"	C. Crow, Louthan, Starling	4:35
4.	"Maker of Miracles"	C. Crow, Jennifer Crow, Joseph Crow, Louthan	3:52
5.	"Hymn of Remembrance"	C. Crow, Je. Crow	4:31
6.	"Shout Your Love"	Jaron Nix	3:04
7.	"Heaven Bound"	Louthan	4:07
8.	"Savior, Crucified"	C. Crow, Joshua Guthrie	5:15
9.	"Hold to This Truth"	C. Crow, Je. Crow	3:53
10.	"Shadow of the Steeple"	Louthan	5:02
11.	"Our God Lives"	Nix	4:49
Total length:			46:32

== Charts ==
Chart (2011)	Peak position
US Billboard 200	166
US Christian Albums (Billboard)	8
US Independent Albums (Billboard)	19
