= Michelle Wright discography =

- Studio albums: 10
- Live albums: 1
- Compilation albums: 2
- Singles: 48
- Music videos: 18

The discography of Canadian country music artist Michelle Wright consists of ten studio albums, two compilations, one live album, 48 singles and 18 music videos.

== Albums ==
=== Studio albums ===
Title	Album details	Peak chart positions					Certifications
Title	Album details	CAN Country	CAN	US Country	US	US Heat	Certifications
Do Right by Me	Release date: 1988; Label: Savannah	32	—	—	—	—	
Michelle Wright	Release date: July 17, 1990; Label: Arista Nashville	—	—	—	—	—	CAN: Gold
Now and Then	Release date: May 26, 1992; Label: Arista Nashville	2	—	20	126	29	CAN: 2× Platinum
The Reasons Why	Release date: September 6, 1994; Label: Arista Nashville	3	44	—	—	—	CAN: 2× Platinum
For Me It's You	Release date: August 27, 1996; Label: Arista Nashville	6	—	74	—	—	CAN: Gold
Shut Up and Kiss Me	Release date: May 7, 2002; Label: BMG Canada / ViK. Recordings / RCA	—	—	—	—	—	
A Wright Christmas	Release date: October 25, 2005; Label: Icon	—	—	—	—	—	
Everything and More	Release date: July 4, 2006; Label: Icon	—	—	—	—	—	
Strong	Release date: July 9, 2013; Label: Savannah	—	—	—	—	—	
Milestone	Release date: August 26, 2022; Label: BFD / Audium Nashville	—	—	—	—	—	
"—" denotes releases that did not chart

=== Compilation albums ===
Title	Album details	Peak positions	Certifications (sales thresholds)
Title	Album details	CAN Country	Certifications (sales thresholds)
The Greatest Hits Collection	Release date: October 26, 1999; Label: Arista Nashville / BMG Canada	12	CAN: Gold
Greatest Hits	Release date: January 25, 2000; Label: Arista Nashville	—	
"—" denotes releases that did not chart

=== Live albums ===
Title	Album details
The Wright Songs: An Acoustic Evening with Michelle Wright	Release date: November 22, 2011; Label: Savannah

== Singles ==
=== 1980s and 1990s ===
Year	Single	Peak chart positions			Album
Year	Single	CAN Country	CAN AC	US Country	Album
1986	"I Want to Count on You"	48	—	—	Do Right by Me
1987	"New Fool at an Old Game"	11	21	—	Do Right by Me
1988	"The Rhythm of Romance"	9	—	—	Do Right by Me
1988	"Do Right by Me"	7	—	—	Do Right by Me
1989	"I Wish I Were Only Lonely"	7	—	—	Do Right by Me
1989	"Rock Me Gently"	7	—	—	Do Right by Me
1989	"I Don't Want to Wonder"	23	18	—	Do Right by Me
1990	"New Kind of Love"	4	—	32	Michelle Wright
1990	"Woman's Intuition"	14	—	72	Michelle Wright
1991	"A Heartbeat Away"	21	—	—	Michelle Wright
1991	"All You Really Wanna Do"	9	—	73	Michelle Wright
1991	"Not Enough Love to Go 'Round"	20	—	—	Michelle Wright
1992	"Take It Like a Man"^{[A]}	1	18	10	Now and Then
1992	"One Time Around"	1	—	43	Now and Then
1992	"He Would Be Sixteen"	3	30	31	Now and Then
1993	"The Change"	14	—	55	Now and Then
1993	"If I'm Ever Over You"	33	—	—	Now and Then
1993	"Guitar Talk"	1	—	—	Now and Then
1994	"Now and Then"	9	—	—	Now and Then
1994	"One Good Man"	1	—	57	The Reasons Why
1994	"The Wall"	4	—	—	The Reasons Why
1995	"Safe in the Arms of Love"	4	—	—	The Reasons Why
1996	"Nobody's Girl"	1	—	50	For Me It's You
1996	"Crank My Tractor"	1	—	—	For Me It's You
1997	"The Answer Is Yes"	4	—	—	For Me It's You
1997	"What Love Looks Like"	4	—	—	For Me It's You
1997	"People Get Ready"	—	49	—	Peace in the Valley
1999	"When I Found You"	5	16	—	The Greatest Hits Collection
1999	"Your Love" (with Jim Brickman; re-release)^{[B]}	—	—	74	Greatest Hits
"—" denotes releases that did not chart

=== 2000s—2020s ===
Year	Single	Peak positions	Album
Year	Single	CAN Country	Album
2000	"I Surrender"^{[C]}	10	The Greatest Hits Collection
2002	"Shut Up and Kiss Me (Or Just Shut Up)"	—	Shut Up and Kiss Me
2002	"Broken"	—	Shut Up and Kiss Me
2002	"I Will Be There"	—	Shut Up and Kiss Me
2003	"Every Time You Come Around"	—	Shut Up and Kiss Me
2005	"Everything and More"	—	Everything and More
2006	"Love Me Anyway"	—	Everything and More
2006	"I've Forgotten You"	26	Everything and More
2007	"Dance in the Boat"	—	Everything and More
2007	"Riding Around the Sun"	33	Everything and More
2007	"I Don't Wanna Be That Strong"	—	Everything and More
2012	"Another Good Day"	46	Strong
2013	"Strong"	43	Strong
2013	"Crazy Stupid Love"	—	Strong
2014	"What's Better Than This"	—	Strong
2015	"Laugh a Little"	—	Strong
2019	"Silver Bells"	—	Non-album single
2021	"Looking for a Lockdown with You" (with Aaron Goodvin, Duane Steele, Amber Marshall, and Scarlett Butler)	50	Non-album single
2022	"Small Town"	—	Milestone
2022	"Heartbreak Song"	—	Milestone
"—" denotes releases that did not chart

=== Guest singles ===
Year	Single	Artist(s)	Peak chart positions			Album
Year	Single	Artist(s)	CAN Country	CAN AC	CAN	Album
1987	"None of the Feeling Is Gone"	Terry Carisse	13	—	—	None of the Feeling Is Gone
1997	"Your Love"	Jim Brickman	15	16	42	Visions of Love
"—" denotes releases that did not chart

== Music videos ==
Year	Title	Director
1990	"New Kind of Love"	Dean Lent
1991	"A Heartbeat Away"	
1991	"All You Really Wanna Do"	Dean Lent
1992	"Take It Like a Man"	Steven Goldmann
1992	"He Would Be Sixteen"	Steven Goldmann
1994	"One Good Man"	Steven Goldmann
1995	"Safe in the Arms of Love"	
1996	"Nobody's Girl"	Steven Goldmann
1997	"What Love Looks Like"	
1997	"Your Love" (with Jim Brickman)	David Safian
1999	"When I Found You"	
2000	"I Surrender"	
2002	"Shut Up and Kiss Me (Or Just Shut Up)"	Lisa Mann
2002	"I Will Be There"	
2005	"Everything and More"	Warren P. Sonoda
2005	"I Know Santa's Been Here"	Warren P. Sonoda
2006	"Joy to the World"	Warren P. Sonoda
2013	"Strong"	Keran Rees

== Notes ==
- A "Take It Like a Man" also peaked at number 52 on RPM Top Singles chart in Canada.
- B "Your Love" also peaked at number 19 on the Billboard Hot Adult Contemporary Tracks chart in the U.S.
- C "I Surrender" also peaked at number 3 on the RPM Adult Contemporary Tracks chart in Canada.
