= The Greatest Hits Collection (Michelle Wright album) =

Greatest hits album by Michelle Wright
- Released: November 2, 1999
- Recorded: 1990–1999
- Genre: Country
- Length: 57:40
- Labels: Arista Nashville; BMG Music Canada
- Producers: Steve Bogard, Dave Deviller, Tim DuBois, Rick Giles, John Guess, Sean Hosein, Jim Scherer, Michael Blakey, Eric Silver

Michelle Wright chronology
| For Me It's You (1996) | The Greatest Hits Collection (1999) | Greatest Hits (2000) |

Singles from Greatest Hits Collection
- 1. "When I Found You" Released: 1999; 2. "I Surrender" Released: 1999

The Greatest Hits Collection is the first greatest hits album by the Canadian country music singer Michelle Wright. It was released on November 2, 1999, on Arista Nashville/BMG Music Canada in Canada. The album has thirteen of Wright's singles and three newly recorded songs.

== Track listing ==
1. "New Kind of Love" (Steve Bogard, Rick Giles) - 3:56
2. "All You Really Wanna Do" (Bogard, Giles) - 3:18
3. "Take It Like a Man" (Tony Haselden) - 3:57
4. "He Would Be Sixteen" (Charlie Black, Jill Colucci, Austin Roberts) - 3:43
5. "Guitar Talk" (Bogard, Colin Linden) - 3:33
6. "Now and Then" (Gary Harrison, Karen Staley) - 3:48
7. "One Good Man" (Bogard, Giles) - 3:40
8. "Safe in the Arms of Love" (Pat Bunch, Mary Ann Kennedy, Pam Rose) - 3:30
9. "Nobody's Girl" (Gretchen Peters) - 3:19
10. "What Love Looks Like" (Michelle Wright, Christi Dannemiller, Lisa Drew) - 3:18
11. "The Answer Is Yes" (Rodney Crowell) - 3:41
12. "People Get Ready" (Curtis Mayfield) - 3:24
13. "Your Love" (Jim Brickman, Dave Deviller, Sean Hosein) - 3:41
14. "Walkin' After Midnight" (Alan Block, Don Hecht) - 3:26
  - duet with Patsy Cline
  - previously unreleased
15. "When I Found You" (Deviller, Hosein, Wright) - 3:40
  - previously unreleased
16. "I Surrender" (Eric Silver, Wright) - 3:37
  - previously unreleased

== Personnel ==
- John Acosta – background vocals
- Michael Black – background vocals
- Bruce Bouton – steel guitar, Weissenborn
- Spady Brannen – bass guitar
- Jim Brickman – piano
- Mak Casstevens – acoustic guitar, mandolin
- Joe Chemay – bass guitar
- Patsy Cline – duet vocals on "Walkin' After Midnight"
- Lisa Cochran – background vocals
- Dave Deviller – acoustic guitar, programming
- Tabitha Fair – background vocals
- Larry Franklin – fiddle
- Paul Franklin – dobro, steel guitar
- John Gardner – drums
- Sonny Garrish – dobro, steel guitar
- Rick Giles – background vocals
- Mark Hill – bass guitar
- John Hobbs – organ, piano
- Paul Hollowell – keyboards
- Sean Hosein – programming
- Dann Huff – electric guitar
- Paul Leim – drums, percussion
- Terry McMillan – percussion
- Liana Manis – background vocals
- Carl Marsh – Fairlight
- Brent Mason – electric guitar
- Anthony Miracle – drums, keyboards
- Steve Nathan – keyboards, piano
- Brian Newcombe – bass guitar
- Michael Omartian – piano
- Larry Paxton – string arrangements
- Michael Rhodes – bass guitar
- Bill Sample – conductor, string arrangements
- Eric Silver – acoustic guitar, electric guitar, mandolin, background vocals
- Karen Staley – background vocals
- Catherine Styron – keyboards
- Biff Watson – acoustic guitar
- Lari White – background vocals
- Kris Wilkinson – string arrangements, strings
- John Willis – acoustic guitar, electric guitar, mandolin
- Lonnie Wilson – drums, percussion
- Michelle Wright – lead vocals

== Chart performance ==
| Chart (1999) | Peak position |
|---|---|
| Canadian RPM Country Albums | 12 |
