= Greatest Hits (Michelle Wright album) =

Greatest hits album by Michelle Wright
- Released: January 25, 2000
- Recorded: 1990–1999
- Genre: Country
- Length: 36:33
- Label: Arista Nashville
- Producers: Steve Bogard, Dave Deviller, Tim DuBois, Rick Giles, John Guess, Sean Hosein, Jim Scherer, Eric Silver

Michelle Wright chronology
| The Greatest Hits Collection (1999) | Greatest Hits (2000) | Shut Up and Kiss Me (2002) |

Professional ratings
Review scores
| Source | Rating |
|---|---|
| AllMusic | link |

Greatest Hits is the second greatest hits album released by the Canadian country music singer Michelle Wright. It was released on January 25, 2000, on Arista Nashville in the United States. The album has nine of Wright's singles and a new remix of her 1999 single "When I Found You".

== Track listing ==
1. "Take It Like a Man" (Tony Haselden) – 3:57
2. "Safe in the Arms of Love" (Pat Bunch, Mary Ann Kennedy, Pamela Rose) – 3:30
3. "He Would Be Sixteen" (Charlie Black, Jill Colucci, Austin Roberts) – 3:43
4. "Nobody's Girl" (Gretchen Peters) – 3:19
5. "When I Found You" (Dave Deviller, Sean Hosein, Michelle Wright) – 3:40
6. "New Kind of Love" (Steve Bogard, Rick Giles) – 3:56
7. "The Answer Is Yes" (Rodney Crowell) – 3:41
8. "What Love Looks Like" (Wright, Christi Dannemiller, Lisa Drew) – 3:18
9. "Guitar Talk" (Bogard, Colin Linden) – 3:33
10. "Your Love" (Jim Brickman, Deviller, Hosein) – 3:41
