= Wild Angels (album) =

Studio album by Martina McBride
- Released: September 26, 1995
- Recorded: 1995
- Studio: The Money Pit (Nashville, Tennessee)
- Genre: Country
- Length: 38:06
- Label: RCA Nashville
- Producers: Paul Worley; Ed Seay; Martina McBride

Martina McBride chronology
The Way That I Am (1993)	Wild Angels (1995)	Evolution (1997)

Singles from Wild Angels
- 1. "Safe in the Arms of Love" Released: July 17, 1995; 2. "Wild Angels" Released: November 20, 1995; 3. "Phones Are Ringin' All Over Town" Released: April 6, 1996; 4. "Swingin' Doors" Released: August 26, 1996; 5. "Cry on the Shoulder of the Road" Released: January 25, 1997

Professional ratings
Review scores
Source	Rating
AllMusic	4/5 stars
Robert Christgau	(2-star Honorable Mention)
Entertainment Weekly	B−
Los Angeles Times	2/4 stars

Wild Angels is the third studio album by the American country music artist Martina McBride. The album produced the singles "Safe in the Arms of Love", the title track, "Swingin' Doors", "Phones Are Ringin' All Over Town" and "Cry on the Shoulder of the Road". The title track was McBride's first number one hit on the US Billboard Hot Country Songs charts. The album was certified Platinum by the RIAA.

Also included on this album is a cover of "Two More Bottles of Wine", which was previously a #1 hit for Emmylou Harris in 1978. "Safe in the Arms of Love" was originally recorded by Wild Choir on their self-titled 1986 album, Baillie & the Boys on their 1989 album Turn the Tide, Kennedy Rose on their 1994 album Walk the Line, and Michelle Wright on her 1994 album The Reasons Why. Wright's version of the song was a Top 10 hit in Canada. "A Great Disguise" would later be recorded by Pam Tillis on her 1998 album Every Time.

== Track listing ==
No.	Title	Writer(s)	Length
1.	"Wild Angels"	Matraca Berg; Gary Harrison; Harry Stinson	3:44
2.	"Safe in the Arms of Love"	Mary Ann Kennedy; Pam Rose; Pat Bunch	3:13
3.	"Phones Are Ringin' All Over Town"	David MacKechnie; Marc Beeson; Kin Vassy	3:31
4.	"A Great Disguise"	Greg Barnhill; Hillary Kanter; Even Stevens	3:58
5.	"Swingin' Doors"	Jim Foster; Chapin Hartford; Bobby Boyd	3:27
6.	"All the Things We've Never Done"	Craig Bickhardt; Jeff Pennig	3:24
7.	"Two More Bottles of Wine"	Delbert McClinton	3:15
8.	"Cry on the Shoulder of the Road"	Berg; Tim Krekel	3:08
9.	"You've Been Driving All the Time"	Stinson; Bunch	4:41
10.	"Born to Give My Love to You"	Kennedy; Rose; Bunch	3:15
11.	"Beyond the Blue"	David Kent; Ashe Underwood	2:25
Total length:			38:06

== Personnel ==
Compiled from liner notes. Musicians

- Eddie Bayers - drums (tracks 2–4 & 10)
- Dennis Burnside - string arrangements (tracks 10 & 11)
- Larry Byrom - electric guitar (tracks 5 & 6)
- Joe Chemay - bass guitar (all tracks), fretless bass (track 2)
- Ashley Cleveland - backing vocals (tracks 1 & 7)
- Rusty "Pedal" Danmyer - pedal steel guitar (tracks 4 & 7)
- Dan Dugmore - electric guitar (tracks 1, 4, 7 & 9), pedal steel guitar (tracks 1 & 8), Dobro (track 11)
- Larry Franklin - fiddle (tracks 2, 5 & 9), mandolin (track 5)
- Carl Gorodetzky, Pamela Sixfin, Kristin Wilkinson, Robert Mason - strings (tracks 10 & 11)
- Vicki Hampton - backing vocals (track 1)
- Levon Helm - backing vocals (track 8)
- John Hobbs - keyboards (track 1, 2, 4 & 8–11), piano (tracks 3 & 7)
- Dann Huff - electric guitar (tracks 1–4, 7, 9 & 10)
- Mary Ann Kennedy - backing vocals (track 2)
- Larry Marrs - backing vocals (tracks 1, 8, 9 & 11)
- Martina McBride - lead vocals (all tracks), tambourine (tracks 1 & 9), backing vocals (tracks 4, 9 & 10)
- Steve Nathan - keyboards (tracks 5 & 6)
- Russ Pahl - pedal steel guitar (tracks 5 & 6)
- Pam Rose - backing vocals (tracks 2 & 10)
- Darrell Scott - mandolin (track 2)
- Eric Silver - mandolin (track 10)
- Harry Stinson - backing vocals (tracks 1, 8 & 11)
- Billy Joe Walker Jr. - acoustic guitar (tracks 2–4 & 10)
- Biff Watson - acoustic guitar (tracks 1, 5–9 & 11)
- Charlie Whitten - pedal steel guitar (track 3)
- Dennis Wilson - backing vocals (tracks 3–5)
- Lonnie Wilson - drums (tracks 1 & 5–9)
- Paul Worley - acoustic guitar (tracks 1, 3–5 & 7–11), high-strung guitar (track 2), electric guitar (tracks 4, 11), six-string bass (track 4)
- Curtis Young - backing vocals (tracks 3–5)

Production

- Jim Burnett - digital editor
- Pete Green - overdubbing engineer
- Martina McBride - producer
- Mike Poole - overdubbing engineer
- Mike Psanos - overdubbing engineer
- Clarke Schleicher - overdubbing engineer
- Ed Seay - producer, engineer, mixing engineer, overdubbing engineer
- Paul Worley - producer

== Chart performance ==
=== Album ===
Chart (1995)	Peak position
U.S. Billboard Top Country Albums	17
U.S. Billboard 200	77
Canadian RPM Country Albums	4

=== Singles ===
Year	Single	Peak positions	
Year	Single	US Country	CAN Country
1995	"Safe in the Arms of Love"	4	38
1995	"Wild Angels"	1	5
1996	"Phones Are Ringin' All Over Town"	28	24
1996	"Swingin' Doors"	38	41
1997	"Cry on the Shoulder of the Road"	26	42

== Certifications ==
Region	Certification
Canada (Music Canada)	Platinum
United States (RIAA)	Platinum
