= Life Is Messy =

Studio album by Rodney Crowell
- Released: May 19, 1992
- Genre: Country
- Length: 42:27
- Label: Columbia
- Producer: Bobby Colomby; Rodney Crowell; Larry Klein; John Leventhal; C. J. Vanston

Rodney Crowell chronology
Keys to the Highway (1989)	Life Is Messy (1992)	Greatest Hits (1993)

Alternative cover
- 2000 reissue cover

Life Is Messy is the seventh studio album by American country music artist Rodney Crowell, released in 1992 by Columbia Records. It peaked at number 30 on the Top Country Albums chart. The songs, "Lovin' All Night", "What Kind of Love", "It's Not for Me to Judge", and "Let's Make Trouble" were released as singles.

== Content ==
The album's first two singles, "Lovin' All Night" and "What Kind of Love", were both released as singles. They respectively reached No. 10 and No. 11 on the Hot Country Songs charts in 1992.

"The Answer Is Yes" was covered by Michelle Wright on her 1996 album For Me It's You, while "Lovin' All Night" was covered by Patty Loveless on her 2003 album On Your Way Home.

== Critical reception ==
Professional ratings
Review scores
Source	Rating
AllMusic	4/5 stars
Chicago Tribune	3.5/4 stars
Entertainment Weekly	C+

William Ruhlmann of AllMusic concluded his review with, "Taken together, the songs on Life Is Messy made for a fascinating portrait of an artist at a personal and professional crossroad -- but it didn't have much to do with commercial country music circa 1992, which is what it was primarily marketed as." He compared the songs' sounds primarily to "a pastiche of late-'50s/early-'60s pop". A review by Jack Hurst in the Chicago Tribune rated the album 3.5 out of 4, saying that the album had "a throbbing sound that is out on the pop-ish progressive end of the country spectrum, it treats life in all its surreal hurtfulness without neglecting its epic joys." A less positive review came from Alanna Nash of Entertainment Weekly, who thought that the album showed emotional influence from Crowell's then-recent divorce from fellow musician Rosanne Cash, and highlighted the song "I Hardly Know How to Be Myself", which the two wrote, as the best song on the album. She also compared Crowell's voice favorably to Roy Orbison but added that "too many of his songs splinter into nebulousness with the occasional joltingly bad line".

== Track listing ==
All tracks are written by Rodney Crowell except where noted.

No.	Title	Writer(s)	Producer(s)	Length
1.	"It's Not for Me to Judge"		Bobby Colomby; John Leventhal; Crowell	4:01
2.	"What Kind of Love"	Crowell; Will Jennings; Roy Orbison	Larry Klein	3:58
3.	"Lovin' All Night"		Leventhal; Crowell	3:50
4.	"Life Is Messy"		Leventhal; C. J. Vanston	4:34
5.	"I Hardly Know How to Be Myself"	Crowell; Rosanne Cash	Leventhal; Crowell	4:45
6.	"It Don't Get Better than This"	Crowell; Leventhal	Leventhal	2:44
7.	"Alone but Not Alone"	Crowell; Klein	Klein	5:08
8.	"Let's Make Trouble"		Klein	4:27
9.	"The Answer Is Yes"		Leventhal; Crowell	4:19
10.	"Maybe Next Time"	Crowell; Leventhal	Leventhal; Crowell	4:58

== Personnel ==
From Life Is Messy liner notes.

Musicians

"It's Not for Me to Judge"

- Marc Cohn - background vocals
- Bobby Colomby - background vocals
- John Leventhal - electric guitar, acoustic guitar
- Jeff Porcaro - drums
- Michael Rhodes - bass guitar
- Steuart Smith - electric guitar, slide guitar
- C. J. Vanston - keyboards

"What Kind of Love"

- Mickey Curry - drums
- Don Henley - background vocals
- Booker T. Jones - organ
- Larry Klein - bass guitar, keyboards
- Linda Ronstadt - background vocals
- Steuart Smith - guitars

"Lovin' All Night"

- Eddie Bayers - drums
- Barry Beckett - electric piano
- Rodney Crowell - acoustic guitar, percussion
- Jim Horn - saxophone
- John Leventhal - guitars, percussion
- Michael Rhodes - bass guitar
- Vince Santoro - background vocals
- Lari White - background vocals

"Life Is Messy"

- Eddie Bayers - drums, percussion
- Vicki Hampton - background vocals
- John Leventhal - guitars
- Jonell Mosser - background vocals
- Michael Rhodes - bass guitar
- C. J. Vanston - keyboards
- Lari White - background vocals
- Steve Winwood - background vocals

"I Hardly Know How to Be Myself"

- Eddie Bayers - drums
- Barry Beckett - organ
- John Leventhal - piano, guitars
- Leland Sklar - bass guitar

"It Don't Get Better than This"

- Larry Byrom - background vocals
- Jim Lauderdale - background vocals
- Albert Lee - background vocals
- John Leventhal - guitar, bass guitar, piano, background vocals
- Larrie Londin - drums

"Alone but Not Alone"

- Vinnie Colaiuta - percussion
- Shawn Colvin - background vocals
- Larry Klein - bass guitar, tremolo guitar, background vocals
- Steuart Smith - guitars

"Let's Make Trouble"

- Alex Acuña - drums, percussion
- Larry Klein - bass guitar, keyboards
- Reginal Sales - slack drum
- Steuart Smith - guitars
- Sam Phillips - background vocals

"The Answer Is Yes"

- Eddie Bayers - drums
- Barry Beckett - organ
- Vicki Hampton - background vocals
- John Leventhal - guitars
- Vince Santoro - background vocals
- Leland Sklar - bass guitar
- Steve Winwood - background vocals

"Maybe Next Time"

- Barry Beckett - organ
- John Leventhal - keyboards, guitar, percussion
- Larrie Londin - drums, percussion
- Vince Santoro - background vocals
- Lari White - background vocals

Technical

- Michael Brauer - mixing (tracks 1, 3, 4, 5, 6, 9, 10)
- Bobby Colomby - production
- Rodney Crowell - production
- Jim Dineen - engineering (tracks 1, 6, 10)
- Larry Klein - production
- John Leventhal - production
- Dan Marnien - engineering and mixing (tracks 2, 7, 8)
- Roger Nichols - engineering (tracks 3, 4, 5, 9)
- C. J. Vanston - production
- Michael Verdick - engineering (track 1)

== Chart performance ==
=== Album ===
Chart (1992)	Peak position
U.S. Billboard Top Country Albums	30
U.S. Billboard 200	155
Canadian RPM Country Albums	9

=== Singles ===
Year	Single	Peak chart positions				
Year	Single	US Country	US AC	CAN Country	CAN	CAN AC
1992	"Lovin' All Night"	10	—	9	—	—
1992	"What Kind of Love"	11	9	2	47	5
1992	"It's Not for Me to Judge"	—	—	—	—	—
1992	"Let's Make Trouble"	—	—	78	—	—
