= Shut Up and Kiss Me (Michelle Wright album) =

Studio album by Michelle Wright
- Released: May 28, 2002
- Recorded: 2001–2002
- Genre: Country pop
- Length: 48:38
- Label: BMG Music Canada; RCA Records; ViK. Recordings
- Producer: Russ DeSalvo; Steven Drake; Eric Silver; Peter Zizzo

Michelle Wright chronology
Greatest Hits (2000)	Shut Up and Kiss Me (2002)	A Wright Christmas (2005)

Shut Up and Kiss Me is an album by the Canadian country music singer-songwriter Michelle Wright. Her sixth album, it was released on May 28, 2002, on BMG Music Canada/RCA/ViK. Recordings.

The title track, "Shut Up and Kiss Me or Just Shut Up", was originally performed by Princessa for her album I Won't Forget You and was later recorded in 2002, by Jamie Benson, the former vocalist of the British pop band Hepburn, for her album My Confession.

== Track listing ==
1. "I Surrender" (Eric Silver, Michelle Wright) – 3:39
2. "Shut Up and Kiss Me or Just Shut Up" (Louise Hoffsten, Shelly Peiken, John Shanks) – 3:29
3. "Still No Shangri-La" (Gerald O'Brien, Silver, Wright) – 4:39
4. "Broken" (Russ DeSalvo, Arnie Roman, Wright) – 4:04
5. "Every Time You Come Around" (Tommy Sims, Wright) – 3:40
6. "Find It in New York" (Silver, Julie Wood) – 4:11
7. "Thank You for Your Love" (Russ DeSalvo, Roman, Wright) – 4:02
8. "Love Is the Only Way" (DeSalvo, Tanya Leah, Stephanie Lewis) – 4:08
9. "Could You Be" (DeSalvo, Roman) – 4:29
10. "Sorry" (Tina Shafer, Wright, Peter Zizzo) – 4:17
11. "I Will Be There" (Silver, Wright) – 3:36
12. "Circle of Life" (Mattis Gustafsson, Larry Loftin, Wright) – 4:16

== Personnel ==
- Jeff Allen – bass guitar
- Rick Almeida – drum programming
- Gary Barnum – slide guitar
- Bob Britt – electric guitar
- Jenny Bruce – background vocals
- Bob Cadway – acoustic guitar
- Dana Calitri – background vocals
- Patrick Carroll – drum programming, bass guitar, percussion
- Lisa Cochran – background vocals
- Russ Desalvo – acoustic guitar, electric guitar, keyboard programming, keyboards
- Steven Drake – bass guitar, electric guitar, background vocals
- Howard Emerson – slide guitar, soloist
- Tabitha Fair – background vocals
- Mattias Gustafsson – acoustic guitar, electric guitar
- Blake Havard – acoustic guitar, piano, background vocals
- Mark Hill – bass guitar
- Shane Keister – Fender Rhodes, Hammond organ, piano, Wurlitzer
- Kim Keyes – background vocals
- Wayne Killius – drums
- Curtis King – background vocals
- David Lawbaugh – drum programming, percussion programming
- Tanya Leah – background vocals
- Gerry Leonard – electric guitar
- Larry Loftin – background vocals
- Kami Lyle – trumpet
- Chris McHugh – drums
- Fleming McWilliams – background vocals
- Anthony Miracle – drum programming, keyboard programming
- John Painter – flugelhorn
- Jeff Roach – drum programming, keyboard programming, keyboards
- Chris Rodriguez – background vocals
- Tina Shafer – background vocals
- Marc Shulman – electric guitar
- Eric Silver – berimbau, acoustic guitar, electric guitar, mandolin, oud, saxophone, violin, background vocals
- Randall Stoll – drums
- Chris Willis – background vocals
- Julie Wood – background vocals
- Michelle Wright – acoustic guitar, lead vocals
- Peter Zizzo – drum programming, acoustic guitar, electric guitar
