= Papa Bear =

Papa Bear may refer to:

- Papa Bear (Sesame Street), a member of the Bear family on Sesame Street
- "Papa Bear" (song), a 1998 song by Keith Harling
- George Halas, American football coach
- Bill O'Reilly (political commentator), American news commentator
- One of the Berenstain Bears
- A character from Goldilocks and the Three Bears
- The son of rapper Nicki Minaj
