= Mike Walker (singer) =

American singer-songwriter

- Birth name: Michael Aubrey Walker
- Origin: Jackson, Tennessee, U.S.
- Genres: Country
- Occupation(s): Singer, songwriter
- Instrument(s): Vocals, Guitar
- Years active: 1998-present
- Labels: DreamWorks Nashville

Michael Aubrey Walker is an American country music artist. In 2000 he was signed by DreamWorks Nashville and in 2001, he released his self-titled debut album. This album produced his only chart single in "Honey Do", which peaked at number 42 on the Billboard country charts. He also toured with Brooks & Dunn on the first annual "Neon Circus Tour" which also featured Toby Keith, Montgomery Gentry, Keith Urban and Cledus T. Judd after the release of his album, although its second through fifth singles all failed to chart. Included on the album were covers of Rodney Crowell's 1990 single "What Kind of Love", Billy "Crash" Craddock's 1974 single "Rub It In", and T. Graham Brown's 1999 single "Memphis Women and Chicken". Gary Allan also recorded the song "See If I Care" on his album of the same name, and "Honey Do" was originally recorded by Keith Harling on his 1999 album Bring It On.

In the late 2000s, Walker began performing in Branson, Missouri.

== Mike Walker (2001) ==
Mike Walker

Studio album by Mike Walker
- Released: October 9, 2001
- Genre: Country
- Label: DreamWorks Nashville
- Producer: James Stroud; Don Cook

Professional ratings
Review scores
Source	Rating
Allmusic	4/5 stars
About.com	(favorable)

=== Track listing ===
1. "Honey Do" (Jeffrey Steele, Al Anderson, Kent Blazy) – 3:11
2. "Stones in the Road" (James House, Wally Wilson) – 4:32
3. "This Is That" (Anderson, Tom Shapiro) – 4:01
4. "Who's Your Daddy?" (Frank J. Myers, Bernie Nelson) – 2:31
5. "See If I Care" (Jamie O'Hara) – 3:18
6. "What Kind of Love" (Rodney Crowell, Will Jennings, Roy Orbison) – 3:14
7. "It's Too Late" (House, Wilson, Drew Womack) – 3:26
8. "I Want a Little More" (Don Cook, Jamie Hartford, Mike Walker) – 2:26
9. "It's Just a Memory" (Joe Collins, Joe Doyle) – 3:05
10. "Long Long Kiss" (Kelly Garrett, Angela Lauer, Tim Lauer) – 2:52
11. "If There's a Chance to Say I Love You" (John Adrian, Dale Morris, Walker) – 3:45
12. "Honey Love Me That Way" (Adrian, Walker) – 3:23
13. "Rub It In" (Layng Martine, Jr.) – 3:00
14. "Memphis Women and Chicken" (Donnie Fritts, Gary Nicholson, Dan Penn) – 3:08

=== Personnel ===
- Al Anderson - acoustic guitar
- Eddie Bayers - drums
- Mark Casstevens - acoustic guitar
- Don Cook - timpani
- Smith Curry - electric dobro
- Stuart Duncan - fiddle
- Sonny Garrish - steel guitar
- Wes Hightower - background vocals
- Jim Horn - saxophone
- David Hungate - bass guitar
- John Barlow Jarvis - piano
- Jerry McPherson - electric guitar
- Brent Mason - electric guitar
- Steve Nathan - keyboards, Hammond organ
- Matt Rollings - keyboards, Hammond organ, piano
- John Wesley Ryles - background vocals
- Robby Turner - steel guitar
- Mike Walker - lead vocals
- Biff Watson - acoustic guitar
- Dennis Wilson - background vocals
- Lonnie Wilson - drums
- Glenn Worf - bass guitar

=== Singles ===
Year	Single	Peak positions
Year	Single	US Country
2001	"Honey Do"	42
2001	"What Kind of Love"	—
2001	"Stones in the Road"	—
2002	"Who's Your Daddy"	—
2002	"If There's a Chance to Say I Love You"	—
"—" denotes releases that did not chart

=== Music videos ===
Year	Video	Director
2001	"Honey Do"	David Abbott
