= What Kind of Love =

Single by Rodney Crowell

from the album Life Is Messy
- B-side: "Nobody's Going to Tear My Playhouse Down"
- Released: June 29, 1992
- Genre: Country
- Length: 3:56
- Label: Columbia
- Songwriters: Rodney Crowell, Roy Orbison, Will Jennings
- Producer: Larry Klein

Rodney Crowell singles chronology
| "Lovin' All Night" (1992) | "What Kind of Love" (1992) | "It's Not for Me to Judge" (1992) |

"What Kind of Love" is a song co-written and recorded by American country music artist Rodney Crowell. It was released in June 1992 as the second single from the album Life Is Messy. The song reached number 11 on the U.S. Billboard Hot Country Singles & Tracks chart and peaked at number 2 on the RPM Country Tracks in Canada.

== History ==
Crowell and co-writer Will Jennings wrote the lyrics to a recording of a melody that Roy Orbison had made before his death. The song features backing vocals from Don Henley and Linda Ronstadt.

== Critical reception ==
Deborah Evans Price, of Billboard magazine reviewed the song favorably, calling it the "first step in a major effort to immerse this rock-influenced country star into the pop and AC realm. She goes on to say that "twangy instrumentation a la Tom Petty and the late Roy Orbison (with whom this song was penned), combined with an appealing vocal, makes a strong argument for play at these and album rock formats."

== Personnel ==
From Life Is Messy liner notes.

Musicians

- Mickey Curry - drums
- Don Henley - background vocals
- Booker T. Jones - Hammond organ
- Larry Klein - bass guitar, keyboards
- Linda Ronstadt - background vocals
- Steuart Smith - guitars

Technical

- Larry Klein - producer
- Dan Marnien - engineering, mixing

== Chart performance ==
"What Kind of Love" debuted at number 75 on the U.S. Billboard Hot Country Singles & Tracks for the week of June 27, 1992.

| Chart (1992) | Peak position |
|---|---|
| Canada Top Singles (RPM) | 47 |
| Canada Adult Contemporary (RPM) | 5 |
| Canada Country Singles (RPM) | 2 |
| US Adult Contemporary (Billboard) | 9 |
| US Hot Country Songs (Billboard) | 11 |

=== Year-end charts ===
| Chart (1992) | Position |
|---|---|
| Canada Adult Contemporary Tracks (RPM) | 42 |
| Canada Country Tracks (RPM) | 30 |

== Other versions ==
Mike Walker covered the song on his 2002 album for DreamWorks Records. It was the B-side to the album's first single, "Honey Do".

Willie Nelson covered the song for his 2025 album of Crowell covers, Oh What A Beautiful World.
