= Bring It On (Keith Harling album) =

Studio album by Keith Harling
- Released: November 23, 1999
- Genre: Country
- Length: 39:23
- Label: Giant
- Producer: John Hobbs, Doug Johnson

Keith Harling chronology
Write It in Stone (1998)	Bring It On (1999)

Professional ratings
Review scores
Source	Rating
Allmusic	link
Country Standard Time	(not rated) link

Bring It On is the second studio album released by American country music artist Keith Harling. Released in 1999, it is also his final studio album. Only two singles were released from it: the title track and "Santa's Got a Semi", neither of which charted in the Top 40 on the country charts. "Honey Do" was later released as a single by Mike Walker from his self-titled debut album, and "Four Walls" by Randy Travis on his album Passing Through.

== Track listing ==
1. "Bring It On" (Rivers Rutherford, George Teren) – 4:21
2. "Honey Do" (Kent Blazy, Al Anderson, Jeffrey Steele) – 3:22
3. "Over You" (Skip Ewing, Donny Kees) – 3:42
4. "Love Without Question" (Doug Johnson, Tony Martin) – 3:35
5. "As If" (Ewing, Steve Diamond) – 4:21
6. "Easy Makin' Love" (Rutherford, Annie Tate, Sam Tate) – 3:31
7. "It Goes Something Like This" (Anderson, Bob DiPiero, Craig Wiseman) – 2:57
8. "Harmless Heart" (Kim Patton-Johnston, Liz Rose) – 3:18
9. "Heartaches and Honky Tonks" (Leslie Satcher, Don Poythress, Luke Wooten) – 2:49
10. "Four Walls" (Don Rollins, Harry Stinson, D. Vincent Williams) – 4:25
11. "Santa's Got a Semi" (Pat Bunch, Johnson) – 3:02

== Personnel ==
- Bruce Bouton – steel guitar
- John Catchings – cello
- Joe Chemay – bass guitar
- David Davidson – violin
- Larry Franklin – fiddle
- Paul Franklin – lap steel guitar, pedal steel guitar
- Steve Gibson – acoustic guitar, bass guitar, six-string bass guitar
- Jackie Harling – background vocals
- Keith Harling – lead vocals
- Wes Hightower – background vocals
- John Hobbs – piano, Hammond organ, keyboards
- Paul Leim – drums, percussion
- Brent Mason – electric guitar
- Terry McMillan – harmonica
- Russ Pahl – Dobro, autoharp
- Tom Roady – percussion
- Brent Rowan – acoustic guitar, electric guitar, mandolin
- Biff Watson – acoustic guitar
- Kris Wilkinson – viola, conductor, string arrangements
- Dennis Wilson – background vocals
