= Swingin' Doors =

Single by Martina McBride

from the album Wild Angels
- B-side: "Phones Are Ringin' All Over Town"
- Released: August 12, 1996
- Genre: Country
- Length: 3:27
- Label: RCA Nashville
- Songwriters: Bobby Boyd; Chapin Hartford; Jim Foster
- Producers: Martina McBride; Paul Worley; Ed Seay

Martina McBride singles chronology
"Phones Are Ringin' All Over Town" (1996)	"Swingin' Doors" (1996)	"Cry on the Shoulder of the Road" (1997)

"Swingin' Doors" is a song written by Bobby Boyd, Chapin Hartford, and Jim Foster. It was recorded by American country music group Molly & the Heymakers under the title "Swinging Doors" for their 1992 self-titled album. Their version, produced by Gregg Brown, was released as a single in August 1992 but did not chart.

It was later recorded by American country music artist Martina McBride, whose version was released in August 1996 as the fourth single from her album Wild Angels. The song reached No. 38 on the Billboard Hot Country Singles & Tracks chart.

== Content ==
The song is about a woman who tells off a "wayward man" who does not remain faithful to her that "you must think my heart has swingin' doors."

== Critical reception ==
Billboard reviewed the Molly & the Heymakers version with favor, saying that "this alternative country record was worth the wait. Catchy, catchy hook."

A review from the same magazine of the McBride version was positive, stating that "McBride's evocative voice fills the chorus with passion and conviction."

== Chart performance ==
Chart (1996)	Peak position
US Hot Country Songs (Billboard)	38
Canadian RPM Country Tracks	41
