= Wild Angels (song) =

Single by Martina McBride

from the album Wild Angels
- B-side: "Two More Bottles of Wine"
- Released: November 20, 1995
- Genre: Country
- Length: 3:44
- Label: RCA Nashville
- Songwriters: Matraca Berg; Gary Harrison; Harry Stinson
- Producers: Paul Worley; Ed Seay; Martina McBride

Martina McBride singles chronology
"Safe in the Arms of Love" (1995)	"Wild Angels" (1995)	"Phones Are Ringin' All Over Town" (1996)

"Wild Angels" is a song written by Matraca Berg, Gary Harrison and Harry Stinson and recorded by American country music artist Martina McBride. It was released in November 1995 as the second single and title track from McBride's album of the same name. The song reached number one on the US Billboard Hot Country Singles & Tracks (now Hot Country Songs) charts, giving McBride her first number one single on that chart. The song's themes of female empowerment and independence resonated with listeners, and it remains one of McBride's signature hits. The album Wild Angels was also well-received by critics and audiences alike.

== Content ==
The song is about a female who looks at her relationship and concludes that there must be "wild angels" watching over her and her lover to keep them together.

McBride's daughter, Delaney, who was a baby at the time, can be heard laughing in the song's intro. According to her Greatest Hits album, McBride had a difficult time recording Delaney. She also praised the production of Paul Worley and Ed Seay, notably Lonnie Wilson's drum fills and Joe Chemay's bass guitar. Worley described the dual electric guitar tracks, with Dan Dugmore on the right channel and Dann Huff on the left, as "amazing".

== Personnel ==
The following musicians perform on this track:

- Joe Chemay – bass guitar
- Ashley Cleveland – backing vocals
- Dan Dugmore – electric guitar, pedal steel guitar
- Vicki Hampton – backing vocals
- John Hobbs – keyboards
- Dann Huff – electric guitar
- Larry Marrs – backing vocals
- Martina McBride – lead vocals, tambourine
- Harry Stinson – backing vocals
- Biff Watson – acoustic guitar
- Lonnie Wilson – drums
- Paul Worley – acoustic guitar

== Music video ==
The music video was directed by Thom Oliphant and premiered in late 1995.

== Chart performance ==
Chart (1995–1996)	Peak position
Canada Country Singles (RPM)	5
US Hot Country Songs (Billboard)	1

=== Year-end charts ===
Chart (1996)	Position
Canada Country Tracks (RPM)	70
US Country Songs (Billboard)	31
