= When I Found You (Michelle Wright song) =

Single by Michelle Wright

from the album The Greatest Hits Collection
- Released: 1999
- Genre: Country pop
- Length: 3:40
- Label: BMG Music Canada
- Songwriters: Dane Deviller; Sean Hosein; Michelle Wright
- Producer: Eric Silver

Michelle Wright singles chronology
"Your Love" (1997)	"When I Found You" (1999)	"I Surrender" (2000)

"When I Found You" is a song recorded by Canadian country music artist Michelle Wright. It was released in 1999 as the first single from her first greatest hits album, The Greatest Hits Collection. It peaked at number 5 on the RPM Country Tracks chart in January 2000.

== Chart performance ==
Chart (1999–2000)	Peak position
Canada Adult Contemporary (RPM)	16
Canada Country Singles (RPM)	5

=== Year-end charts ===
Chart (1999)	Position
Canada Country Tracks (RPM)	82
