= Wild Choir =

- Origin: Nashville, Tennessee, U.S.
- Genres: Country rock
- Years active: 1985 – 1987
- Labels: RCA Nashville
- Past members: Larry Chaney; Denny Dadmun-Bixby; Gail Davies; Bob Mummert; Pete Pendras

Wild Choir was an American country music band. It consisted of Gail Davies (lead vocals, guitar), Larry Chaney (guitar, backing vocals), Pete Pendras (guitar, backing vocals), Denny Dadmun-Bixby (bass, harmony vocals), and Bob Mummert (drums).

Davies thought of the idea upon returning from a trip to London, England in 1985. Upon speaking with RCA executive Joe Galante, the band signed a recording contract with RCA Nashville. Along with a self-titled studio album, the band released three singles in 1986. Although the last single, "Safe in the Arms of Love", did not chart, it would later become a major hit for both Michelle Wright and Martina McBride in 1995 respectively. Two singles from the album followed, the highest-charting being "Heart to Heart", which reached number forty on the Billboard Hot Country Singles chart.

Wild Choir's singles received major criticism from country music radio. Many stations found the recordings to be too closely associated with rock music, believing it would not respond well with listeners. Although they did not achieve major chart success, Wild Choir has been cited as the forerunner of today's Americana movement and has influenced other country bands, including Highway 101 and Foster & Lloyd. A second album was recorded by the band but was never released.

After Wild Choir disbanded, Gail Davies signed with MCA Records and produced an album with label president, Jimmy Bowen. She then proceeded to form her own record label - Little Chickadee Productions. Guitarist Larry Chaney went on to work with Edwin McCain. Pete Pendras teamed up with Neil Andersson from the Northwest band The Wailers to record several albums. Drummer Bob Mummert became a session musician and is currently the drummer for Grand Ole Opry stars, Daley & Vincent. Denny Dadmun-Bixby joined a country group Great Plains and appeared as a background vocalist on Suzy Bogguss' 1998 album Nobody Love, Nobody Gets Hurt.

== Discography ==
=== Studio albums ===
List of albums, with no available chart positions
Title	Album details
Wild Choir	Released: 1986; Label: RCA Nashville; Formats: LP, cassette

=== Singles ===
List of singles, with selected chart positions
Title	Year	Peak chart positions	Album
Title	Year	US Country	Album
"Next Time"	1986	51	Wild Choir
"Heart to Heart"	1986	40	Wild Choir
"Safe in the Arms of Love"	1986	—	Wild Choir
"—" denotes releases that did not chart

== Music videos ==
Year	Title	Director
1986	"Safe in the Arms of Love"	David Hogan
