= Coming Back for You =

Single by Keith Harling

from the album Write It in Stone
- B-side: "I Never Go Around Mirrors"
- Released: August 1, 1998
- Genre: Country
- Length: 3:28
- Label: MCA Nashville
- Songwriter(s): John Rich, Tom Shapiro, Chris Waters
- Producer(s): Wally Wilson

Keith Harling singles chronology
"Papa Bear" (1998)	"Coming Back for You" (1998)	"Write It in Stone" (1998)

"Coming Back for You" is a song recorded by American country music artist Keith Harling. It was released in August 1998 as the second single from the album Write It in Stone. The song reached #39 on the Billboard Hot Country Singles & Tracks chart. The song was written by John Rich, Tom Shapiro and Chris Waters

== Chart performance ==
Chart (1998)	Peak position
US Hot Country Songs (Billboard)	39
Canadian RPM Country Tracks	58
