= Molly & the Heymakers =

- Also known as: Molly and the Danger Band, Molly Otis, Molly Stoddard, Molly Scheer, Molly & The Makers
- Origin: Hayward, Wisconsin, USA
- Genres: Country,
- Years active: 1987-1995
- Labels: Reprise; Muskie Queen Records; Media Records
- Past members: Martha "Molly" Scheer; Andy Dee; Jeff Nelson; Joe Lindzius; Chad "C.J." Udeen
- Website: Molly and the Danger Band featuring Molly Scheer Otis Stoddard

Molly & the Heymakers was an American country music group formed in 1987. The band consisted of Martha "Molly" Scheer (lead vocals, fiddle, mandolin, rhythm guitar), Andy Dee (lead guitar), Jeff Nelson (bass guitar), Joe Lindzius (drums) and Chad "C.J." Udeen (steel guitar). Their highest-charting single, "Chasin' Something Called Love," peaked at No. 50 on the Billboard Hot Country Singles & Tracks chart in 1991; it was included on their self-titled debut album, issued in 1992 on Reprise Records.

== Transition to new sound ==
In 1997, Molly Scheer and Andy Dee, along with Rick Berger (bass guitar) and Scott Tate (drums), released an album of harder-edged material under the moniker known as "Molly & The Makers." The music on this album featured a mixture of styles including Alt.country, Cowpunk, Country, folk rock, Rock and Roll, Alternative rock, rock, power pop, punk rock, garage punk, indie rock and indie pop. Within a couple of years the group folded. Lead guitarist Andy Dee died at age 63 in February 2024.

== Discography ==
=== Albums ===
Title	Album details
Molly & The Heymakers	Release date: 1988; Label: Muskie Queen Records
Live Wires	Release date: 1989; Label: Muskie Queen Records
Molly & the Heymakers	Release date: March 31, 1992; Label: Reprise Records
B-Sides from the Milkhouse	Release date: 1993; Label: Muskie Queen Records
Big Things	Release date: 1995; Label: Muskie Queen Records
Lucky Flame (as Molly & the Makers)	Release date: 1997; Label: Media Records

=== Singles ===
Year	Single	Peak chart positions		Album
Year	Single	US Country	CAN Country	Album
1990	"Chasin' Something Called Love"	50	38	Molly & the Heymakers
1991	"He Comes Around"	59	51	Molly & the Heymakers
1992	"Mountain of Love"	—	79	Molly & the Heymakers
1992	"Jimmy McCarthy's Truck"	69	86	Molly & the Heymakers
1992	"Swinging Doors"	—	—	Molly & the Heymakers
"—" denotes releases that did not chart

=== Music videos ===
Year	Video	Director
1990	"Chasin' Something Called Love"	Joanne Gardner
1991	"Mountain of Love"	Jim Shea
