= The Wall (Michelle Wright song) =

Single by Michelle Wright

from the album The Reasons Why
- Released: 1994
- Recorded: 1994
- Genre: Country
- Length: 3:30
- Label: Arista Nashville
- Songwriters: Steve Bogard; Rick Giles
- Producers: Steve Bogard; Mike Clute

Michelle Wright singles chronology
"One Good Man" (1994)	"The Wall" (1994)	"Safe in the Arms of Love" (1995)

"The Wall" is a song recorded by Canadian country music artist Michelle Wright. It was released in 1994 as the second single from her fourth studio album, The Reasons Why. It peaked at number 4 on the RPM Country Tracks chart in January 1995.

== Chart performance ==
Chart (1994–1995)	Peak position
Canada Country Singles (RPM)	4

=== Year-end charts ===
Chart (1995)	Position
Canada Country Tracks (RPM)	89
