= Write It in Stone =

Studio album by Keith Harling
- Released: May 19, 1998
- Genre: Country
- Label: MCA Nashville
- Producer: Wally Wilson

Keith Harling chronology
| Write It in Stone (1998) | Bring It On (1999) |

Singles from Write It in Stone
- 1. "Papa Bear" Released: March 7, 1998; 2. "Coming Back for You" Released: August 1, 1998; 3. "Write It in Stone" Released: October 1998; 4. "There Goes the Neighborhood" Released: February 1999

Professional ratings
Review scores
| Source | Rating |
|---|---|
| Allmusic | link |
| Country Standard Time | link |

Write It in Stone is the debut studio album by American country music artist Keith Harling. Released in 1998 on the MCA Nashville label, it produced four singles: "Papa Bear", "Coming Back for You", the title track, and "There Goes the Neighborhood", all of which charted on the Billboard Hot Country Songs charts, although only "Papa Bear" and "Coming Back for You" reached Top 40. The track "I Never Go Around Mirrors" is a cover of a hit single by Lefty Frizzell which has also been recorded by Keith Whitley.

== Track listing ==
| No. | Title | Writer(s) | Length |
|---|---|---|---|
| 1. | "Papa Bear" | Keith Harling | 4:03 |
| 2. | "Write It in Stone" | Harling | 3:11 |
| 3. | "I Love What I See" | Mark D. Sanders, Ed Hill | 3:31 |
| 4. | "Right in the Middle" | Harling, Melba Montgomery | 2:36 |
| 5. | "I Never Go Around Mirrors" | Lefty Frizzell, Sanger D. Shafer | 3:50 |
| 6. | "Coming Back for You" | John Rich, Chris Waters, Tom Shapiro | 3:28 |
| 7. | "There Goes the Neighborhood" | Harling | 3:10 |
| 8. | "Afterthoughts" | Sharon Vaughn, Bill Anderson | 3:04 |
| 9. | "Walkin' Away" | Harling | 3:32 |
| 10. | "Three Words Away" | Harling | 3:56 |

== Personnel ==
- Mark Casstevens – acoustic guitar
- Paul Franklin – pedal steel guitar, Dobro
- Kenny Greenberg – electric guitar
- Jackie Harling – background vocals
- Keith Harling – lead vocals
- John Hughey – pedal steel guitar
- John Barlow Jarvis – piano
- Jerry Kimbrough – acoustic guitar
- Liana Manis – background vocals
- Brent Mason – electric guitar
- Michael Rhodes – bass guitar
- John Wesley Ryles – background vocals
- Joe Spivey – fiddle, mandolin
- Billy Joe Walker, Jr. – acoustic guitar
- Lonnie Wilson – drums, percussion
- Curtis Young — background vocals

== Chart performance ==
| Chart (1998) | Peak position |
|---|---|
| U.S. Billboard Top Country Albums | 56 |
| U.S. Billboard Top Heatseekers | 48 |
