= Lovin' All Night =

1992 single by Rodney Crowell

Single by Rodney Crowell

from the album Life Is Messy
- B-side: "I Didn't Know I Could Lose You"
- Released: March 7, 1992
- Genre: Country
- Length: 3:50
- Label: Columbia
- Songwriter: Rodney Crowell
- Producers: Rodney Crowell, John Leventhal

Rodney Crowell singles chronology
"Things I Wish I Said" (1991)	"Lovin' All Night" (1992)	"What Kind of Love" (1992)

"Lovin' All Night" is a song written and recorded by American country music artist Rodney Crowell. It was released in March 1992 as the first single from his album Life Is Messy. The song peaked at number 10 on the Billboard Hot Country Singles and Tracks chart.

== Critical reception ==
Alanna Nash of Entertainment Weekly described the song as "randy" and "celebrat[ing] his new sexual freedom" following his divorce from Rosanne Cash.

== Chart performance ==
"Lovin' All Night" spent 20 weeks on Hot Country Songs, peaking at number 10. It was Crowell's final Top 10 hit on that chart.

Chart (1992)	Peak position
Canada Country Singles (RPM)	9
US Hot Country Songs (Billboard)	10

=== Year-end charts ===
Chart (1992)	Position
Canada Country Tracks (RPM)	83

== Patty Loveless version ==
"Lovin' All Night"

Single by Patty Loveless

from the album On Your Way Home
- B-side: "Nothin' Like the Lonely"
- Released: June 14, 2003
- Genre: Country
- Length: 3:38
- Label: Epic
- Songwriter: Rodney Crowell
- Producer: Emory Gordy Jr.

Patty Loveless singles chronology
"Out of Control Raging Fire" (2002)	"Lovin' All Night" (2003)	"On Your Way Home" (2003)

Patty Loveless included a version of the song on her eighth album with Epic Records, On Your Way Home, her thirteenth album of original music overall. The single was released in 2003. It was the first single released from the album.

According to Loveless "...On the Down From The Mountain tour last year (2002), a friend of mine, Rodney Crowell was out there with me. Rodney was hosting the show, and he would perform it. We were having the best time of our lives out there, and we were in Roanoke, Virginia and he asked me to come out and perform with him, and I couldn't refuse him. Later, when I was in the process of reviewing material for the new album, I remembered the night in Roanoke and I asked my producer if we could contract Rodney and include the song on the album. So, that's how it came about how I recorded "Lovin All Night".

=== Chart performance ===
The song charted for 20 weeks on the Billboard Hot Country Singles and Tracks chart, reaching number 18 during the week of September 27, 2003.

Chart (2003)	Peak position
US Hot Country Songs (Billboard)	18
US Billboard Hot 100	81
