= Now and Then (Michelle Wright album) =

Studio album by Michelle Wright
- Released: May 26, 1992
- Recorded: 1991–1992
- Studios: Sounds Interchange, Ontario, Canada, and The Soundshop, Nashville, TN
- Genre: Country
- Length: 35:56
- Label: Arista Nashville
- Producers: Steve Bogard, Rick Giles

Michelle Wright chronology
Michelle Wright (1990)	Now and Then (1992)	The Reasons Why (1994)

Singles from Now and Then
- 1. "Take It Like a Man" Released: February 1992; 2. "One Time Around" Released: July 6. 1992; 3. "He Would Be Sixteen" Released: October 1992; 4. "Guitar Talk" Released: 1993; 5. "Now and Then" Released: 1994

Professional ratings
Review scores
Source	Rating
AllMusic	3/5 stars

Now and Then is the third studio album by the Canadian country music artist Michelle Wright. It was released on May 26, 1992, on Arista Nashville. The album's first single, "Take It Like a Man", became Wright's first number one hit on the Canadian RPM Country Tracks chart and her only top ten hit on the U.S. Billboard Hot Country Singles & Tracks chart. Two more singles, "One Time Around" and "Guitar Talk", also topped the Canadian RPM Country Tracks chart.

== Track listing ==
No.	Title	Writer(s)	Length
1.	"Take It Like a Man"	Tony Haselden	3:57
2.	"If I'm Ever Over You"	Mark D. Sanders, Trisha Yearwood	3:08
3.	"Now and Then"	Gary Harrison, Karen Staley	3:47
4.	"One Time Around"	Chapin Hartford, Don Pfrimmer	3:33
5.	"He Would Be Sixteen"	Charlie Black, Jill Colucci, Austin Roberts	3:45
6.	"The Change"	Steve Bogard, Rick Giles	3:44
7.	"Don't Start with Me"	Bogard, Michael Clark	3:35
8.	"Guitar Talk"	Bogard, Colin Linden	3:34
9.	"Fastest Healing Wounded Heart"	Pat Bunch, Curtis Stone	3:00
10.	"A Little More Comfortable"	Hartford	3:46

== Personnel ==
As listed in liner notes.

- Bruce Bouton – pedal steel guitar, Weissenborn
- Spady Brannan – bass guitar
- Sonny Garrish – pedal steel guitar, pedabro
- Rick Giles – background vocals
- Carl Marsh – Fairlight
- Brent Mason – electric guitar
- Steve Nathan – piano, keyboards
- Karen Staley – background vocals
- Catherine Styron – keyboards
- Biff Watson – acoustic guitar
- Lari White – background vocals
- John Willis – acoustic guitar, mandolin
- Lonnie Wilson – drums
- Michelle Wright – lead vocals

== Chart performance ==
=== Weekly charts ===
Chart (1992)	Peak position
Canadian Country Albums (RPM)	2
US Billboard 200	126
US Top Country Albums (Billboard)	20
US Heatseekers Albums (Billboard)	29

=== Year-end charts ===
Chart (1992)	Position
US Top Country Albums (Billboard)	71
