= Michelle Wright (album) =

Studio album by Michelle Wright
- Released: July 17, 1990
- Recorded: 1990
- Studio: OmniSound Recording Studio and Midtown Tone and Volume, Nashville, TN
- Genre: Country
- Length: 34:56
- Label: Arista Nashville
- Producer: Steve Bogard, Rick Giles

Michelle Wright chronology
Do Right By Me (1988)	Michelle Wright (1990)	Now and Then (1992)

Singles from Michelle Wright
- 1. "New Kind of Love" Released: April 1990; 2. "All You Really Wanna Do" Released: April 1991

Professional ratings
Review scores
Source	Rating
AllMusic	4/5 stars

Michelle Wright is the second studio album by the Canadian country music artist Michelle Wright. It was released on July 17, 1990, on Arista Nashville. The album's first single, "New Kind of Love", was Wright's first top 40 country hit in the U.S.

== Track listing ==
All song written by Steve Bogard and Rick Giles except where noted.

No.	Title	Writer(s)	Length
1.	"All You Really Wanna Do"		3:16
2.	"New Kind of Love"		3:54
3.	"Woman's Intuition"		2:52
4.	"Wide Open"	Charlie Black, Bogard	3:43
5.	"Not Enough Love to Go 'Round"	Bogard, Bobby Fischer, Giles	3:52
6.	"The Longest Night"		3:21
7.	"The Dust Ain't Settled Yet"	Craig Bickhardt, Brent Maher, Don Schlitz	3:18
8.	"A Heartbeat Away"		3:18
9.	"Like a Hurricane"	Michael Clark	3:59
10.	"As Far as Lonely Goes"	Matraca Berg, Janis Ian	3:14

== Personnel ==
As listed in liner notes.

- Richard "Spadey" Brannon - bass guitar
- Paul Franklin - steel guitar
- John Gardner - drums
- Paul Hollowell - keyboards
- Carl Marsh - Fairlight
- Brent Mason - guitars
- Terry McMillan - percussion

All background vocals by Rick Giles except "Like a Hurricane" - Rick Giles and Nancy T. Michaels.
