= Everything and More (Michelle Wright album) =

Studio album by Michelle Wright
- Released: July 4, 2006
- Recorded: 2006
- Genre: Country
- Length: 41:39
- Label: Icon Records
- Producer: Russ Zavitson; Tony Haselden

Michelle Wright chronology
A Wright Christmas (2005)	Everything and More (2006)	Strong (2013)

Everything and More is the seventh studio album by the Canadian singer Michelle Wright. It was released on July 4, 2006, on Icon Records. The album includes the singles "Everything and More", "Love Me Anyway" and "I've Forgotten You", which had been a single for the American bluegrass singer Rhonda Vincent. "My Give a Damn's Busted" was a Number One country hit in 2005 for Jo Dee Messina, and "Dance in the Boat" was a single for The Kinleys in 1998 from their album Just Between You and Me.

== Track listing ==
1. "Everything and More" (Patricia Conroy, Gerald O'Brien, Michelle Wright) - 3:29
2. "Dance in the Boat" (Craig Bickhardt, Tony Haselden) - 3:04
3. "Riding Around the Sun" (Sunny Russ) - 2:54
4. "I Don't Wanna Be That Strong" (Haselden, Tim Mensy) - 3:33
5. "In the Blink of an Eye" (Conroy, O'Brien, Wright) - 3:51
6. "I've Forgotten You" (Angelo, Brett James, Hillary Lindsey, Troy Verges) - 3:48
7. "Love Me Anyway" (Sarah Majors) - 3:53
8. "Something Wild" (Michael Dulaney, Maia Sharp) - 3:56
9. "You Can't Lose Them All" (Kim Richey, Sharp, Paul Thorn) - 3:15
10. "My Give a Damn's Busted" (Joe Diffie, Tony Martin, Tom Shapiro) - 3:08
11. "Like an Angel" (Pat Buchanan, David Leone) - 3:32
12. "Voodoo" (George Caddisy, George Ducas, Johnny Gilchrist) – 3:09
