= Now and Then (Karen Staley song) =

Single by Michelle Wright

from the album Now and Then
- Released: 1994
- Genre: Country
- Length: 3:47
- Label: Arista Nashville
- Songwriters: Gary Harrison; Karen Staley
- Producers: Steve Bogard; Rick Giles

Michelle Wright singles chronology
"Guitar Talk" (1993)	"Now and Then" (1994)	"One Good Man" (1994)

"Now and Then" is a song written by Gary Harrison and Karen Staley and recorded by Staley. It was released in 1989 as the second single from her debut album, Wildest Dreams. It peaked at number 87 on the Billboard Hot Country Singles chart. The song was later recorded by Canadian country music artist Michelle Wright. Wright's version was released in 1994 as the seventh single from her third studio album, Now and Then. It peaked at number 9 on the RPM Country Tracks chart in May 1994.

== Chart performance ==
=== Karen Staley ===
Chart (1989)	Peak position
U.S. Billboard Hot Country Singles	87

=== Michelle Wright ===
Chart (1994)	Peak position
Canada Country Singles (RPM)	9
