= I Surrender (Michelle Wright song) =

2000 single by Michelle Wright

Single by Michelle Wright

from the album The Greatest Hits Collection
- Released: 2000
- Genre: Country, pop
- Length: 3:37
- Label: Windham Hill
- Songwriters: Eric Silver; Michelle Wright
- Producer: Eric Silver

Michelle Wright singles chronology
"When I Found You" (1999)	"I Surrender" (2000)	"Shut Up and Kiss Me (Or Just Shut Up)" (2002)

"I Surrender" is a song recorded by Canadian country music artist Michelle Wright. It was released in 2000 as the second single from her first greatest hits album, The Greatest Hits Collection. It peaked at number 10 on the RPM Country Tracks chart in April 2000. In 2001, it was named by SOCAN as one of the most performed Canadian country songs.

== Chart performance ==
Chart (2000)	Peak position
Canada Adult Contemporary (RPM)	3
Canada Country Singles (RPM)	10
