= Strong (Michelle Wright album) =

Studio album by Michelle Wright
- Released: July 9, 2013
- Recorded: 2012–2013
- Genre: Country
- Length: 37:32
- Label: Savannah
- Producer: Jason Barry; Eric Silver; Danick Dupelle

Michelle Wright chronology
Everything and More (2006)	Strong (2013)

Singles from Strong
- 1. "Another Good Day" Released: April 2012; 2. "Strong" Released: April 2013; 3. "Crazy Stupid Love" Released: September 2013; 4. "What's Better Than This" Released: March 2014; 5. "Laugh a Little" Released: February 2015

Strong is the eighth studio album by the Canadian country music artist Michelle Wright. It was released in Canada on July 9, 2013, by Savannah Records and in the United States on October 22, 2013.

== Critical reception ==
Markos Papadatos of Digital Journal gave the album a favorable review, writing that "this CD is very uplifting and full of hope and there are no filler tracks on here; moreover, each of the eleven songs has the potential to become a radio single."

== Track listing ==
No.	Title	Length
1.	"Strong"	3:02
2.	"Crazy Stupid Love"	2:56
3.	"One of These Days"	3:43
4.	"What's Better Than This"	3:31
5.	"Laugh a Little"	2:53
6.	"She's a Keeper"	4:02
7.	"Another Good Day"	3:56
8.	"Together Forever"	3:31
9.	"Walkin' on a Heart That's Breakin'"	2:59
10.	"Back to You"	2:55
11.	"I'll Cry Too"	4:04
Total length:		37:32

== Chart performance ==
=== Singles ===
Year	Single	Peak positions
Year	Single	CAN Country
2012	"Another Good Day"	46
2013	"Strong"	43
2013	"Crazy Stupid Love"	—
2014	"What's Better Than This"	—
2015	"Laugh a Little"	—
"—" denotes releases that did not chart
