= One Time Around =

Single by Michelle Wright

from the album Now and Then
- Released: July 6, 1992
- Genre: Country
- Length: 3:33
- Label: Arista
- Songwriters: Chapin Hartford; Don Pfrimmer
- Producers: Steve Bogard; Rick Giles

Michelle Wright singles chronology
"Take It Like a Man" (1992)	"One Time Around" (1992)	"He Would Be Sixteen" (1992)

"One Time Around" is a single by Canadian country music artist Michelle Wright. Released in 1992, it was the second single from her album Now and Then. It reached #1 on the RPM Country Tracks chart in October 1992.

== Chart performance ==
Chart (1992)	Peak position
Canada Country Singles (RPM)	1
US Hot Country Songs (Billboard)	43

=== Year-end charts ===
Chart (1992)	Position
Canada Country Tracks (RPM)	47
