= All You Really Wanna Do =

Single by Michelle Wright

from the album Michelle Wright
- B-side: "The Longest Night"
- Released: April 1991
- Recorded: 1990
- Genre: Country
- Length: 3:16
- Label: Arista Nashville
- Songwriters: Steve Bogard; Rick Giles
- Producers: Steve Bogard; Rick Giles

Michelle Wright singles chronology
"A Heartbeat Away" (1991)	"All You Really Wanna Do" (1991)	"Not Enough Love to Go 'Round" (1991)

"All You Really Wanna Do" is a song recorded by Canadian country music artist Michelle Wright. It was released in April 1991 as the fourth single from her second studio album, Michelle Wright. It peaked at number 9 on the RPM Country Tracks chart in August 1991.

== Chart performance ==
Chart (1991)	Peak position
Canada Country Singles (RPM)	9
US Hot Country Songs (Billboard)	73

=== Year-end charts ===
Chart (1991)	Position
Canada Country Tracks (RPM)	80
