= A Wright Christmas =

Studio album by Michelle Wright
- Released: October 25, 2005
- Recorded: 2005
- Genre: Country
- Length: 40:54
- Label: Icon Records
- Producer: Russ Zavitson; Tony Haselden

Michelle Wright chronology
| Shut Up and Kiss Me (2002) | A Wright Christmas (2005) | Everything and More (2006) |

A Wright Christmas is the first Christmas album by the Canadian country music singer-songwriter Michelle Wright. It was released on October 25, 2005, on Icon Records.

== Track listing ==
1. Have Yourself a Merry Little Christmas (Ralph Blane, Hugh Martin) – 4:21
2. Jingle Bell Rock (Joe Beal, Jim Boothe) – 2:10
3. Joy to the World (George Handel, Isaac Watts) – 4:08
4. I Know Santa's Been Here (Patricia Conroy) – 2:00
5. Little Drummer Boy (Katherine Davis, Henry Onorati, Harry Simeone) – 3:35
6. Rudolph the Red-Nosed Reindeer (Johnny Marks) – 3:22
7. The Christmas Song (Mel Tormé, Robert Wells) – 3:42
8. Silent Night (Franz Gruber, Joseph Mohr) – 4:12
9. Go Tell It on the Mountain (Traditional) – 2:52
10. Winter Wonderland (Felix Bernard, Richard Smith) – 3:38
11. O Come All Ye Faithful (Frederick Oakeley, John Francis Wade) – 3:24
12. White Christmas (Irving Berlin) – 3:22
