= The Reasons Why (album) =

Studio album by Michelle Wright
- Released: September 1, 1994
- Recorded: 1994
- Genre: Country
- Length: 36:28
- Label: Arista
- Producers: Steve Bogard; Mike Clute; Val Garay; John Guess

Michelle Wright chronology
Now and Then (1992)	The Reasons Why (1994)	For Me It's You (1996)

Singles from The Reasons Why
- 1. "One Good Man" Released: 1994; 2. "The Wall" Released: 1994; 3. "Safe in the Arms of Love" Released: March 1995

The Reasons Why is the fourth studio album by the Canadian country music singer Michelle Wright. It was released in Canada on September 1, 1994, on Arista Nashville.

"Try Getting Over You" was later recorded by Daron Norwood on his 1995 album Ready, Willing and Able. "Safe in the Arms of Love" was later released as a single by Martina McBride from her 1995 album Wild Angels.

By March 1995, the album was approaching 100,000 sales.

== Track listing ==
1. "One Good Man" (Steve Bogard, Rick Giles) - 3:41
2. "Safe in the Arms of Love" (Pat Bunch, Mary Ann Kennedy, Pam Rose) - 3:31
3. "We've Tried Everything Else" (Bob DiPiero, Steve Seskin, Pam Tillis) - 3:54
4. "Cold Kisses" (Chapin Hartford, Tillis) - 4:08
5. "The Reasons Why I'm Gone" (Chuck Cannon, Gary Loyd) - 3:12
6. "Try Getting Over You" (Paul Nelson, Craig Wiseman) - 3:57
7. "Where Do We Go from Here" (Jill Colucci, Randy Sharp, Michelle Wright) - 3:54
8. "Tell Me More" (Chuck Jones, Cactus Moser) - 3:00
9. "The Wall" (Bogard, Giles) - 3:30
10. "The Old Song and Dance" (Layng Martine, Jr., Kent Robbins) - 3:33

== Personnel ==
- Richard Bennett – Fender Rhodes, electric guitar
- Stephanie Bentley – background vocals
- Michael Black – background vocals
- Mark Casstevens – acoustic guitar, mandolin
- Joe Chemay – bass guitar
- John Cowan – background vocals
- Bill Cuomo – piano
- Dan Dugmore – pedal steel guitar
- Paul Franklin – dobro, pedal steel guitar, lap steel guitar
- Sonny Garrish – dobro, pedal steel guitar
- Rob Hajacos – fiddle
- Tony Harrell – keyboards
- Dann Huff – electric guitar
- Paul Leim – drums, percussion
- Raul Malo – background vocals
- Liana Manis – background vocals
- Brent Mason – electric guitar
- Steve Nathan – keyboards, piano
- Michael Omartian – piano
- John Wesley Ryles – background vocals
- Cindy Walker – background vocals
- Biff Watson – acoustic guitar
- Lari White – background vocals
- John Willis – guitar
- Lonnie Wilson – drums
- Glenn Worf – bass guitar
- Michelle Wright – lead vocals

== Chart performance ==
Chart positions for The Reasons Why
Chart	Peak
Canada Top Albums/CDs (RPM)	44
Canada Country Albums/CDs (RPM)	4
