= Papa Bear (song) =

Single by Keith Harling

from the album Write It in Stone
- B-side: "Right in the Middle"
- Released: March 7, 1998
- Genre: Country
- Length: 4:03
- Label: MCA Nashville
- Songwriter(s): Keith Harling
- Producer(s): Wally Wilson

Keith Harling singles chronology
"Papa Bear" (1998)	"Coming Back for You" (1998)

"Papa Bear" is a debut song written and recorded by American country music artist Keith Harling. It was released in March 1998 as the first single from the album Write It in Stone. The song reached No. 24 on the Billboard Hot Country Singles & Tracks chart.

== Music video ==
Actor Dean Cain directed the song's music video.

== Chart performance ==
Chart (1998)	Peak position
US Hot Country Songs (Billboard)	24
Canadian RPM Country Tracks	26
