= Keith Harling =

American musician

- Born: May 8, 1963 (age 62)
- Origin: Greenwood, South Carolina, U.S.
- Genres: Country
- Occupation: Singer-songwriter
- Instrument(s): Vocals, rhythm guitar, saxophone, drums
- Years active: 1996–2001
- Labels: MCA Nashville; Giant

Keith Harling (born May 8, 1963) is an American former country music artist. He made his debut in 1998 with the album Write It in Stone, issued on the MCA Nashville label. It produced four singles on the Billboard Hot Country Singles & Tracks (now Hot Country Songs) charts. A second album, Bring It On, was issued a year later on the Giant Records label.

== Biography ==
Harling was born in Greenwood, South Carolina. His family moved to Chattanooga, Tennessee when he was still young. At age ten, Harling constructed a drum kit, which he taught himself how to play; he also developed his musical style through impersonation of songs that he saw on television. Later on, when in high school, Harling also learned to play bass guitar, saxophone, and trumpet, all of which he played in several bands.

He initially moved to Nashville, Tennessee, only to return to Chattanooga after failing to make himself known in Nashville. By 1996, however, he returned to Nashville, where he soon found work as a songwriter for MCA Nashville Records. After only six weeks as a session songwriter, he was also signed to a record deal. In 1998, Harling's debut album, Write It in Stone, was released. Consisting mostly of songs co-written by Harling, his debut album produced two Top 40 entries on the Billboard Hot Country Singles & Tracks charts in "Papa Bear" and "Coming Back for You", but additional singles proved less successful.

Having been dropped from MCA Nashville's roster in early 1999, Harling later signed to Giant Records, releasing his second album Bring It On that year. On his second album, however, Harling was persuaded to record mostly other writers' material instead of his own. The album's only official single, which was the title track, peaked at No. 52. Another selection from the album, "Santa's Got a Semi", charted in both 2000 and 2001 as a Christmas single before Harling exited Giant as well.

Harling is currently living in the Chattanooga, Tennessee area operating a small business with his wife.

== Discography ==
=== Albums ===
Title	Album details	Peak chart positions	
Title	Album details	US Country	US Heat
Write It in Stone	Release date: May 19, 1998; Label: MCA Nashville	56	48
Bring It On	Release date: November 23, 1999; Label: Giant Records	—	—
"—" denotes releases that did not chart

=== Singles ===
Year	Single	Peak chart positions		Album
Year	Single	US Country	CAN Country	Album
1998	"Papa Bear"	24	26	Write It in Stone
1998	"Coming Back for You"	39	58	Write It in Stone
1999	"Write It in Stone"	61	66	Write It in Stone
1999	"There Goes the Neighborhood"	58	—	Write It in Stone
1999	"Bring It On"	52	—	Bring It On
"—" denotes releases that did not chart

=== Other charted songs ===
Year	Single	Peak positions	Album
Year	Single	US Country	Album
2000	"Santa's Got a Semi"	60	Bring It On
2001	"Santa's Got a Semi" (re-entry)	60	Bring It On

=== Music videos ===
Year	Video	Director
1998	"Papa Bear"	Dean Cain
1998	"Coming Back for You"	Michael Merriman
