= Crank My Tractor =

Single by Michelle Wright

from the album For Me It's You
- Released: 1996
- Genre: Country
- Length: 3:02
- Label: Arista
- Songwriters: Steven Dale Jones, Mark Narmore
- Producers: Jim Scherer; Tim DuBois; Monty Powell; John Guess; Val Garay

Michelle Wright singles chronology
"Nobody's Girl" (1996)	"Crank My Tractor" (1996)	"The Answer Is Yes" (1997)

"Crank My Tractor" is a single by Canadian country music artist Michelle Wright. Released in 1996, it was the second single from her album For Me It's You. The song reached #1 on the RPM Country Tracks chart in December 1996.

== Chart performance ==
Chart (1996)	Peak position
Canada Country Singles (RPM)	1

=== Year-end charts ===
Chart (1996)	Position
Canada Country Tracks (RPM)	83
