= Safe in the Arms of Love =

1986 single by Michelle Wright

Single by Wild Choir

from the album Wild Choir
- Released: 1986
- Genre: Country rock
- Length: 2:52
- Label: RCA
- Songwriters: Mary Ann Kennedy, Pam Rose, Pat Bunch
- Producers: Gail Davies, Pete Pendras

Wild Choir singles chronology
"Heart to Heart" (1986)	"Safe in the Arms of Love" (1986)

"Safe in the Arms of Love" is a country music song written by Mary Ann Kennedy, Pam Rose and Pat Bunch in 1986. The song was originally recorded by the American country music band Wild Choir. It was issued on their self-titled debut album in 1986 and was also released as the project's lead single. The song failed to chart. A music video, directed by David Hogan, was shot for the band's version and was scheduled to be broadcast on MTV, but due to a program change, never aired.

In 1994, two of the song's co-writers, Mary Ann Kennedy and Pam Rose who were performing as Kennedy Rose, recorded the song on their second album, Walk the Line.

== Cover versions ==
The song was later recorded by Anne Kirkpatrick in 1987 on her Come Back Again album, and Baillie & the Boys in 1989 on their Turn the Tide album. Then it was recorded by Rhonda Gunn in 1991.

=== Michelle Wright version ===
"Safe in the Arms of Love"

Single by Michelle Wright

from the album The Reasons Why
- Released: March 1995
- Recorded: 1994
- Genre: Country
- Length: 3:30
- Label: Arista Nashville
- Songwriters: Mary Ann Kennedy, Pam Rose, Pat Bunch
- Producer: John Guess

Michelle Wright singles chronology
"The Wall" (1994)	"Safe in the Arms of Love" (1995)	"Nobody's Girl" (1996)

In late 1994, Michelle Wright recorded and released the song as a single the following year. Her version was included on her 1994 album The Reasons Why.

=== Martina McBride version ===
"Safe in the Arms of Love"

Single by Martina McBride

from the album Wild Angels
- B-side: "Life #9"
- Released: July 17, 1995
- Recorded: 1995
- Genre: Country
- Length: 3:15
- Label: RCA Nashville
- Songwriters: Mary Ann Kennedy, Pam Rose, Pat Bunch
- Producers: Paul Worley, Ed Seay, Martina McBride

Martina McBride singles chronology
"Where I Used to Have a Heart" (1995)	"Safe in the Arms of Love" (1995)	"Wild Angels" (1995)

Music video
- "Safe in the Arms of Love" at CMT.com

Martina McBride recorded "Safe in the Arms of Love" in 1995 and released it as a single. McBride's version can be found on her 1995 album Wild Angels.

The music video for the song was directed by Steven Goldmann, and premiered in mid-1995. It was shot in Montreal, Canada at the training school for the Cirque du Soleil. It features acrobats and performers in full makeup. As the song ends, McBride is shown lying in a field of grass and smelling a bouquet of flowers.

Billboard gave McBride's version a positive review, saying that it "sounds custom-made for country radio" and is "nicely complemented by the backing vocals".

== Chart performance ==
=== Michelle Wright ===
Chart (1995)	Peak position
Canada Country Singles (RPM)	4

==== Year-end charts ====
Chart (1995)	Position
Canada Country Tracks (RPM)	60

=== Martina McBride ===
Chart (1995)	Peak position
Canada Country Singles (RPM)	38
US Hot Country Songs (Billboard)	4

==== Year-end charts ====
Chart (1995)	Position
US Country Songs (Billboard)	44

== Other versions ==
- Anne Kirkpatrick recorded the song in 1987 on her LP Come Back Again.
- Lisa Stanley recorded the song in 2017 on her album Heart and Soul.
