= The Answer Is Yes =

Single by Michelle Wright

from the album For Me It's You
- B-side: "Cold Kisses"
- Released: 1997
- Genre: Country
- Length: 3:41
- Label: Arista Nashville
- Songwriter: Rodney Crowell
- Producer: Jim Scherer

Michelle Wright singles chronology
"Crank My Tractor" (1996)	"The Answer Is Yes" (1997)	"What Love Looks Like" (1997)

"The Answer Is Yes" is a song written and originally recorded by Rodney Crowell on his 1992 album Life Is Messy. It was also recorded by Canadian country music artist Michelle Wright. Wright released the song in 1997 as the third single from her fifth studio album, For Me It's You. Her version peaked at number 4 on the RPM Country Tracks chart in May 1997.

== Chart performance ==
Chart (1997)	Peak position
Canada Country Singles (RPM)	4

=== Year-end charts ===
Chart (1997)	Position
Canada Country Tracks (RPM)	10
