= New Kind of Love =

Single by Michelle Wright

from the album Michelle Wright
- B-side: "As Far as Lonely Goes"
- Released: April 1990
- Genre: Country
- Length: 3:54
- Label: Arista Nashville
- Songwriters: Steve Bogard; Rick Giles
- Producers: Steve Bogard; Rick Giles

Michelle Wright singles chronology
"I Don't Want to Wonder" (1989)	"New Kind of Love" (1990)	"Woman's Intuition" (1990)

"New Kind of Love" is a song written by Steve Bogard and Rick Giles, and recorded by Canadian country music artist Michelle Wright. It was released in April 1990 as the first single from her album Michelle Wright. It peaked at number 4 on the RPM Country Tracks chart in September 1990.

== Chart performance ==
Chart (1990)	Peak position
Canada Country Singles (RPM)	4
US Hot Country Songs (Billboard)	32

=== Year-end charts ===
Chart (1990)	Position
Canada Country Tracks (RPM)	37
