= What Love Looks Like =

Single by Michelle Wright

from the album For Me It's You
- Released: 1997
- Genre: Country
- Length: 3:18
- Label: Arista Nashville
- Songwriters: Michelle Wright; Christi Dannemiller; Lisa Drew
- Producer: Jim Scherer

Michelle Wright singles chronology
"The Answer Is Yes" (1997)	"What Love Looks Like" (1997)	"People Get Ready" (1997)

"What Love Looks Like" is a song recorded by Canadian country music artist Michelle Wright. It was released in 1997 as the fourth single from her fifth studio album, For Me It's You. It peaked at number 4 on the RPM Country Tracks chart in September 1997.

== Chart performance ==
Chart (1997)	Peak position
Canada Country Singles (RPM)	4

=== Year-end charts ===
Chart (1997)	Position
Canada Country Tracks (RPM)	26
