= Take It Like a Man (Michelle Wright song) =

Single by Michelle Wright

from the album Now and Then
- B-side: "Guitar Talk"
- Released: February 1992
- Genre: Country
- Length: 3:57
- Label: Arista Nashville
- Songwriter: Tony Haselden
- Producers: Steve Bogard; Rick Giles

Michelle Wright singles chronology
"Not Enough Love to Go 'Round" (1991)	"Take It Like a Man" (1992)	"One Time Around" (1992)

"Take It Like a Man" is a song written by Tony Haselden, and recorded by Canadian country music artist Michelle Wright. It was released in February 1992 as the first single from Wright's album Now and Then. The song became Wright's first Number One on the Canadian RPM Country Tracks charts that year. It was also her only top 10 hit on the Billboard Hot Country Singles & Tracks chart in the United States. Country singer Lari White is featured on background vocals.

The single and its music video, directed by Canadian director Steven Goldmann, went on to win Single of the Year and Video of the Year from the Canadian Country Music Association. The album that included the song won Album of the Year from the RPM Big Country Awards in 1993. The song's success in the United States won Wright Top New Female Vocalist from the Academy of Country Music in 1993.

== Chart performance ==
In Canada, the song debuted at number 84 on the RPM Country Tracks on the chart dated March 28, 1992 and spent 11 weeks on the chart before peaking at number 1 on June 6, 1992.

Chart (1992)	Peak position
Canada Top Singles (RPM)	52
Canada Adult Contemporary (RPM)	18
Canada Country Singles (RPM)	1
US Hot Country Songs (Billboard)	10

=== Year-end charts ===
Chart (1992)	Position
Canada Country Tracks (RPM)	6
