= One Good Man =

Single by Michelle Wright

from the album The Reasons Why
- Released: 1994
- Recorded: 1994
- Genre: Country
- Length: 3:41
- Label: Arista
- Songwriters: Steve Bogard; Rick Giles
- Producers: Steve Bogard; Mike Clute; Val Garay; John Guess

Michelle Wright singles chronology
"Now and Then" (1994)	"One Good Man" (1994)	"The Wall" (1994)

"One Good Man" is a single by Canadian country music artist Michelle Wright. Released in 1994, it was the first single from her album The Reasons Why. The song reached #1 on the RPM Country Tracks chart in October 1994.

== Chart performance ==
Chart (1994)	Peak position
Canada Country Singles (RPM)	1
US Hot Country Songs (Billboard)	57

=== Year-end charts ===
Chart (1994)	Position
Canada Country Tracks (RPM)	35
