= He Would Be Sixteen =

Single by Michelle Wright

from the album Now and Then
- B-side: "The Change"
- Released: October 1992
- Genre: Country
- Length: 3:45
- Label: Arista Nashville
- Songwriters: Charlie Black; Jill Colucci; Austin Roberts
- Producers: Steve Bogard; Rick Giles

Michelle Wright singles chronology
"One Time Around" (1992)	"He Would Be Sixteen" (1992)	"The Change" (1993)

"He Would Be Sixteen" is a song written by Jill Colucci, Charlie Black and Austin Roberts, and recorded by Canadian country music artist Michelle Wright. It was released in October 1992 as the third single from her third studio album, Now and Then. It peaked at number 3 on the RPM Country Tracks chart in January 1993.

== Content ==
Wright said in A Year in the Life that she did not identify with the song when she recorded it, because she had never been pregnant or put a child up for adoption, but she chose to record it anyway because it received positive feedback in concerts.

== Critical reception ==
The song was nominated for a Juno Award for Single of the Year at the 1994 Juno Awards.

== Chart performance ==
Chart (1992–1993)	Peak position
Canada Adult Contemporary (RPM)	30
Canada Country Singles (RPM)	3
US Hot Country Songs (Billboard)	31

=== Year-end charts ===
Chart (1992)	Position
Canada Country Tracks (RPM)	97

Chart (1993)	Position
Canada Country Tracks (RPM)	51
