= For Me It's You =

Studio album by Michelle Wright
- Released: August 27, 1996
- Recorded: 1996
- Genre: Country
- Length: 35:14
- Label: Arista Nashville
- Producers: Jim Scherer; Tim DuBois; Monty Powell; John Guess; Val Garay

Michelle Wright chronology
The Reasons Why (1994)	For Me It's You (1996)	The Greatest Hits Collection (1999)

Singles from For Me It's You
- 1. "Nobody's Girl" Released: 1996; 2. "Crank My Tractor" Released: 1996; 3. "The Answer Is Yes" Released: 1997; 4. "What Love Looks Like" Released: 1997

Professional ratings
Review scores
Source	Rating
Allmusic	4/5 stars

For Me It's You is the fifth studio album by the Canadian country music singer Michelle Wright. It was released on August 27, 1996, on Arista Nashville. Two tracks, "We've Tried Everything Else" and "Cold Kisses", were reprised from Wright's 1994 album, The Reasons Why. Raul Malo, the lead singer of the country music group The Mavericks, sings backup on the track "Love Has No Pride".

The Canadian version of the album features "As Good As It Gets" and "Laid Back Stone Cold" in place of "Cold Kisses"

== Track listing ==
1. "Nobody's Girl" (Gretchen Peters) – 3:19
2. "The Answer Is Yes" (Rodney Crowell) – 3:41
3. "We've Tried Everything Else" (Pam Tillis, Bob DiPiero, Steve Seskin) – 3:53
4. "I'm Not Afraid" (Dougie Pincock, Monty Powell, Debi Cochran, Anna Wilson) – 3:12
5. "What Love Looks Like" (Michelle Wright, Christi Dannemiller, Lisa Drew) – 3:18
6. "You Owe Me" (Craig Wiseman, Ronnie Samoset) – 3:28
7. "For Me It's You" (Marilyn Martin, Trey Bruce, Thom McHugh) – 3:19
8. "Cold Kisses" (Tillis, Chapin Hartford) – 4:05
9. "Crank My Tractor" (Steven Dale Jones, Mark Narmore) – 3:02
10. "Love Has No Pride" (Eric Kaz, Libby Titus) – 3:50

== Personnel ==
- Brian Barnett – drums
- Richard Bennett – electric guitar
- Michael Black – background vocals
- Mark Casstevens – acoustic guitar, mandolin
- Joe Chemay – bass guitar
- John Cowan – background vocals
- Bill Cuomo – synthesizer
- Dan Dugmore – steel guitar
- Tabitha Fair – background vocals
- Michael Francis – acoustic guitar, electric guitar
- Larry Franklin – fiddle
- Paul Franklin – dobro, steel guitar, pedabro
- Michael Freeman – bass guitar, background vocals
- John Gardner – drums
- Sonny Garrish – dobro, steel guitar
- Steve Gibson – electric guitar
- Rick Gratton – drums
- Tony Harrell – keyboards
- John Hobbs – organ, piano
- Dann Huff – electric guitar
- Sheree Jeacocke – background vocals
- John Johnson – baritone saxophone, tenor saxophone
- Paul Leim – drums, percussion
- Pasi Leppikangas – drums
- Sara Majors – acoustic guitar, mandolin, background vocals
- Raul Malo – background vocals on "Love Has No Pride"
- Liana Manis – background vocals
- The Nashville String Machine – strings
- Steve Nathan – keyboards
- Don Nielson – background vocals
- Michael Omartian – piano
- Kim Parent – background vocals
- Lou Pomanto – accordion, piano
- Monty Powell – background vocals
- Mark Prentice – bass guitar
- Kip Raines – background vocals
- Buck Reid – steel guitar
- Michael Rhodes – bass guitar
- Tom Roady – percussion
- Matt Rollings – keyboards
- Jim Scherer – acoustic guitar, electric guitar
- Mike Severs – electric guitar
- Eric Silver – fiddle, acoustic guitar, electric guitar, mandolin
- Tom Szczesniak – bass guitar
- Billy Thomas – drums
- Lee Warren – dobro, steel guitar
- Biff Watson – acoustic guitar
- John Willis – acoustic guitar
- Dennis Wilson – background vocals
- Michelle Wright – lead vocals

== Chart performance ==
Chart performance for For Me It's You
Chart (1996)	Peak position
Canadian Country Albums (RPM)	6
US Top Country Albums (Billboard)	74
