= Nobody's Girl (Michelle Wright song) =

Single by Michelle Wright

from the album For Me It's You
- Released: 1996
- Genre: Country
- Length: 3:19
- Label: Arista
- Songwriter: Gretchen Peters
- Producers: Jim Scherer; Tim DuBois; Monty Powell; John Guess; Val Garay

Michelle Wright singles chronology
"Safe in the Arms of Love" (1995)	"Nobody's Girl" (1996)	"Crank My Tractor" (1996)

"Nobody's Girl" is a single by Canadian country music artist Michelle Wright. Released in 1996, it was the first single from her album For Me It's You. The song reached #1 on the RPM Country Tracks chart in August 1996.

== Chart performance ==
Chart (1996)	Peak position
Canada Country Singles (RPM)	1
US Hot Country Songs (Billboard)	50

=== Year-end charts ===
Chart (1996)	Position
Canada Country Tracks (RPM)	7
