= BMG Music Canada =

- Founded: 1987
- Country of origin: Canada
- Location: Toronto, Ontario

BMG Music Canada was the Canadian division of Bertelsmann Music Group (BMG), headquartered in Toronto, Ontario, Canada.

== History ==
The company's origins date to 1924, when it was established as the Victor Talking Machine Co. of Canada Limited. It was subsequently renamed RCA Victor Company, Ltd. in 1934, RCA Limited in 1968, and RCA Inc. in 1980. In 1986, following the acquisition of RCA Records by its international parent company, the Canadian operation was renamed BMG Music Canada as part of a global rebranding of RCA's international divisions under the BMG name.

In 1987, BMG established a Canadian division of Ariola Records in partnership with BMG International, N.V.

In 1990, after previously working with releases by Henri Dès, BMG acquired Interdisc Distribution Inc., a Lanoraie, Quebec-based company. This acquisition led to the formation of BMG Québec, initially operating as BMG Musique du Québec under the direction of Nicolas Ferrier.

During the 1990s, BMG Music Canada released several dance music compilation albums. In 1995, Paul Alofs was appointed President of BMG Canada, while former artist manager Keith Porteous was promoted to Vice President. Around this time, BMG also became the Canadian distributor for the band Treble Charger.

In 1998, Lisa Zbitnew, who had served as General Manager the previous year, was appointed President of the company.

In 2004, BMG Music Canada merged with Sony Music Canada to form Sony BMG Music Canada Inc.

== See also ==
- List of record labels
