= Guitar Talk =

Single by Michelle Wright

from the album Now and Then
- Released: 1993
- Genre: Country
- Length: 3:34
- Label: Arista
- Songwriters: Steve Bogard; Colin Linden
- Producers: Steve Bogard; Rick Giles

Michelle Wright singles chronology
| "If I'm Ever Over You" (1993) | "Guitar Talk" (1993) | "Now and Then" (1994) |

"Guitar Talk" is a single by Canadian country music artist Michelle Wright. Released in 1993, it was the sixth single from her album Now and Then. The song reached #1 on the RPM Country Tracks chart in January 1994.

== Chart performance ==
| Chart (1993–1994) | Peak position |
|---|---|
| Canada Country Singles (RPM) | 1 |

=== Year-end charts ===
| Chart (1994) | Position |
|---|---|
| Canada Country Tracks (RPM) | 40 |
