= Michelle Wright =

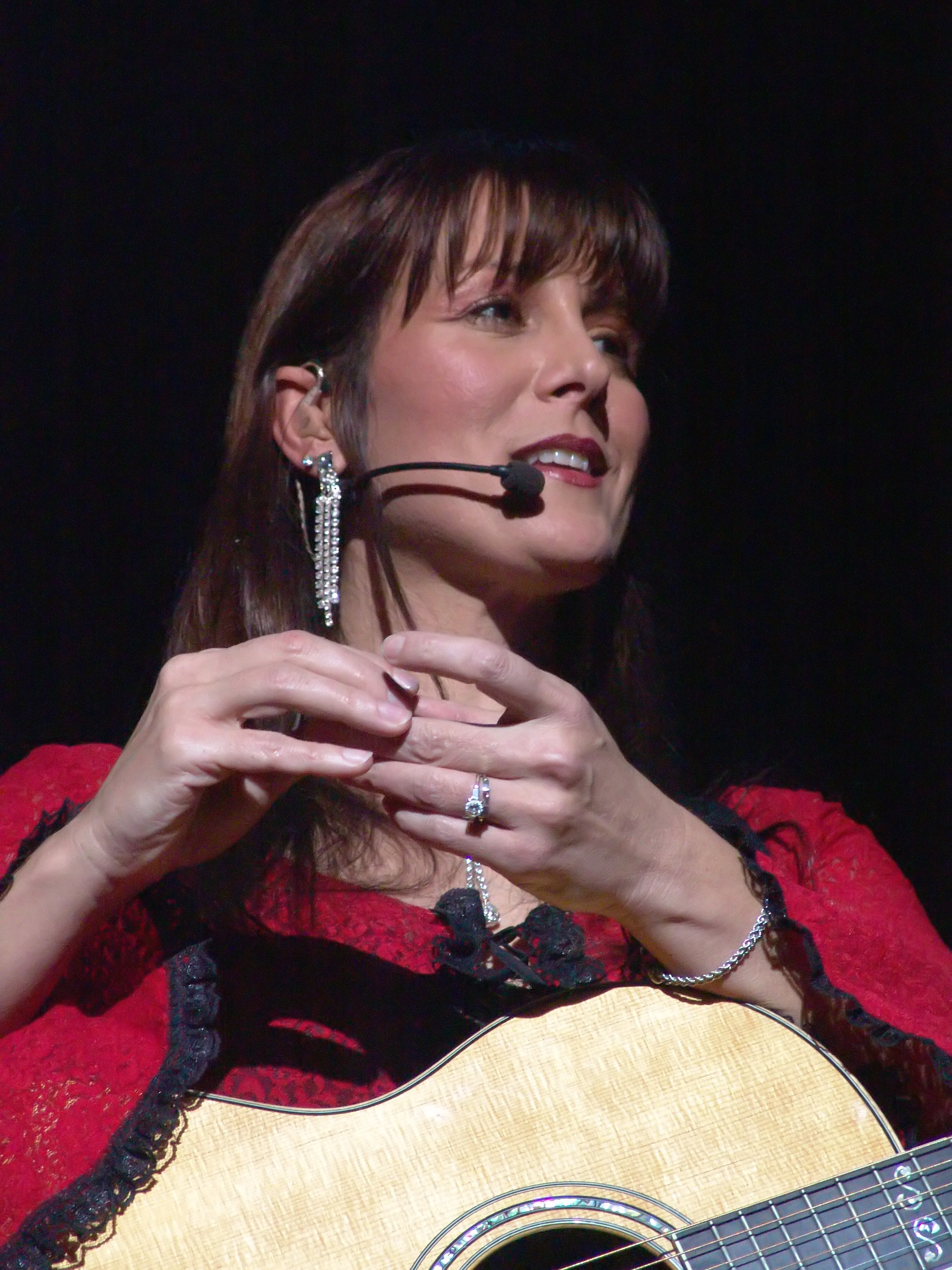
- Michelle Wright in December 2004

Background information
- Born: July 1, 1961 (age 65); Chatham, Ontario, Canada
- Origin: Merlin, Ontario, Canada
- Genres: Country
- Occupation: Singer-songwriter
- Instruments: Vocals, guitar
- Years active: 1980–present
- Labels: Savannah, Arista Nashville, RCA/Vik Recordings, Icon, Navigator Records
- Website: michelle-wright.com

Michelle Wright (born July 1, 1961) is a Canadian country music artist. She won the Canadian Country Music Association's Fans' Choice Award twice (1993 and 1995). In 2011, Wright was inducted into the Canadian Country Music Hall of Fame.

Wright's primary success has been in her native Canada, where she has charted more than twenty-five singles, including six Number One hits: "Take It Like a Man", "One Time Around", "Guitar Talk", "One Good Man", "Nobody's Girl" and "Crank My Tractor". She also had chart success in the United States in the 1990s, landing in the Top 40 on the Billboard Hot Country Songs charts with "Take It Like a Man" at No. 10, "He Would Be Sixteen" at No. 31 and "New Kind of Love" at No. 32.

== Career ==
=== Early life ===
Michelle Wright was born on July 1, 1961, in Chatham, Ontario. Wright grew up in the small nearby town of Merlin where her parents were both local music performers. By 1980, when Wright was in college studying counseling for the mentally disadvantaged, she joined a local band with whom she performed until 1983.

That year Wright started her own band. She performed with her own band until 1988. In 1985, while performing with her band, Wright signed a record deal with Savannah Records. The next year she released her debut single, "I Want to Count on You", which peaked at No. 48 on the Canadian RPM Country Tracks chart.

Wright's debut album, Do Right by Me, was issued in 1988 and produced seven more singles, including Wright's cover of the 1974 Andy Kim hit, "Rock Me Gently", which reached No. 7 on the Canadian RPM Country Tracks chart. The album's success in Canada led to a record contract with Arista Nashville. Wright became one of the label's flagship artists.

=== 1990–1993: Breakthrough success ===
In April 1990, Wright's first American single, "New Kind of Love", was issued and became her first "Top Five" hit in Canada, in addition to peaking at No. 32 on the Billboard Hot Country Singles & Tracks chart in the United States. Her second album, Michelle Wright, was released in July 1990. To support the album, Wright was added as an opening act to Kenny Rogers 1991 tour. The album became a success in Canada.

That year, 1990, Wright was awarded Female Artist of the Year by the Canadian Country Music Association. The following year she was awarded Album of the Year for Michelle Wright, Single of the Year for "New Kind of Love", and Female Artist of the Year again by the Canadian Country Music Association.

Due to the success of her album Michelle Wright and single "New Kind of Love," Wright relocated to Nashville, Tennessee, in 1991 to spend more time advancing her career. When in Nashville, Wright began to record her third album, Now and Then, released in May 1992. The album's first single, "Take It Like a Man", became an instant hit, reaching No. 1 in Canada on the RPM Country Tracks chart and No. 10 in the United States on the Billboard Hot Country Singles & Tracks chart. In Canada, the song also crossed over to the adult contemporary charts, peaking at No. 18. The song received the Single of the Year award from the Canadian Country Music Association in late 1992.

In 1993, the album earned Wright the award for Top New Female Vocalist from the Academy of Country Music. She appeared on the CBS television special, Women of Country, where she performed "Take It Like a Man" and the Mary Chapin Carpenter song, "The Hard Way," with several other artists including Carpenter. Now and Then went on to produce six more singles, including the Canadian number one hits "One Time Around" and "Guitar Talk". The album also contained the single, "He Would Be Sixteen", which reached No. 31 on the U.S. Billboard Hot Country Singles & Tracks chart and No. 3 on the Canadian RPM Country Tracks chart. It was awarded Single of the Year by the Canadian Country Music Association in 1993. Also in 1993, Wright won the Fans' Choice Award from Canadian Country Music Association, which she would also win in 1995.

=== 1994–1999: Further success ===
Wright's fourth album, The Reasons Why, was released in September 1994 in Canada. Plans for the album to be released in the United States were delayed and eventually cancelled. The album was also released in Europe after Wright completed a successful tour in mid-1994. In early 1995, Wright embarked on a 40-city tour in Canada, which at that time was the most extensive tour in the history of country music in Canada.

In August 1996, Wright released her fifth album, For Me It's You, following the release of the first single, "Nobody's Girl", which reached No. 1 on the Canadian RPM Country Tracks and No. 57 on the U.S. Billboard Hot Country Singles & Tracks chart. The album marked Wright's first album to be released in the American market in four years. The album went on to be successful in Canada, producing three Top Five singles in "Crank My Tractor", "The Answer Is Yes", and "What Love Looks Like". The album was not a success in the United States. In a 1997 interview with Jam!, Wright admitted that she was "very disappointed" and "not happy with what [U.S. radio] did with this album".

During 1997, Wright was awarded the C.F. Martin Humanitarian Award by the Canadian Country Music Association for her international work with the Special Olympics; her successful fundraising efforts for St. Joseph's Hospital in Chatham, Ontario, the hospital where she was born; and her support for the Manitoba flood relief fund.

In 1999, U.S. radio welcomed Wright back when her 1997 duet with pianist Jim Brickman was released to radio. The song, "Your Love", failed at country radio, but gave Wright her only American adult contemporary hit when the song peaked at No. 19 on the Billboard Hot Adult Contemporary Tracks chart. Despite the song's success at AC radio, it would be Wright's last charting single in the United States.

In October 1999, Wright's first greatest hits album, The Greatest Hits Collection, was released in Canada. The album included two new songs, "I Surrender" and "When I Found You", both of which were Top Ten hits on the Canadian RPM Country Tracks chart. In 2000, Arista Nashville released the American version of her 1999 greatest hits album in the United States. The album contained a different track list than the Canadian version. The album was Wright's final release with Arista Nashville.

=== 2000–present: Success today ===
In 2002, Wright was transferred to RCA Records/ViK. Recordings. That year she released her sixth studio album, Shut Up and Kiss Me, in June 2002. The album showed Wright in a more pop-driven styled than her previous work. Wright co-wrote eight of the album's twelve songs, and recorded songs by successful songwriters such as Shelly Peiken, who wrote pop singer Christina Aguilera's 1999 hit, "What a Girl Wants". Shut Up and Kiss Me also contained a more pop-oriented version of her 2000 single, "I Surrender." This version had been used for the song's music video and pop radio release.

In 2004, Wright started her annual Christmas tour, Dreaming of a Wright Christmas. A year later Wright signed with Icon Records and in October 2005, she released her first Christmas album, A Wright Christmas in Canada. The album featured covers of eleven Christmas songs and one new song, "I Know Santa's Been Here", written by Canadian country singer Patricia Conroy. The song was issued as the album's first single in December 2005. A Wright Christmas was released digitally in the United States 2007 and Europe in 2008.

In June 2006, Wright returned to country music by releasing her first new album in four years, Everything and More in Canada. In 2007, Everything and More was made available digitally in United States.

In 2011, Savannah Music Canada released Wright's first live album, The Wright Songs: An Acoustic Evening with Michelle Wright. The album features seventeen tracks, including singles and unreleased album cuts.

Wright released a new single, "Another Good Day," to Canadian country radio on April 24, 2012. She released a new single entitled "Strong" to radio in April 2013. Wright's first album of original material in seven years, Strong, was released on July 9, 2013.

In 2015, Wright signed with Chuck Thompson, President of the Nashville-based Thompson Entertainment Group, for management.

In 2018, she signed with Navigator Records and the label released her first brand new music since the release of Strong. "Lovin' This Day" and "Attitude Is Everything" were released as singles with an "old-school" A side song and a B side song configuration across all digital platforms on the Navigator Records label.

For 2019, Navigator released Wright's recording of the holiday classic "Silver Bells," produced by fellow Canadian Bob Funk, to launch the A Wright Christmas: 2019 with concert dates across Alberta and Ontario.

Wright's newest album, titled "Milestone" was released on August 26, 2022. The album features nine new tracks, followed by a new recording of her 1992 hit, "Take It Like a Man."

In October, 2023 she was inducted into the Chatham-Kent Cultural Hall of Fame for her contributions to country music as a singer/songwriter.

=== Canadian Country Music Hall of Fame Induction ===
In 2011, Wright was inducted into the Canadian Country Music Hall of Fame at a special gala dinner and award ceremony in Hamilton, Ontario. Wright, the year's artist inductee, was recognized for her outstanding contributions to Canada's country music landscape. Wright has been acknowledged within the collections of the National Music Centre in Calgary, Alberta since 2014.

=== Other work ===
Wright appeared as a country music star in an episode in Season 4 of the Canadian TV series Due South. The episode, entitled "Mountie Sings the Blues," deals with the Mountie's efforts to protect Wright's character, Tracy Jenkins, from a stalker. She sings "Nobody's Girl" at the conclusion of the episode.
