= Matt Minglewood =

Canadian musician

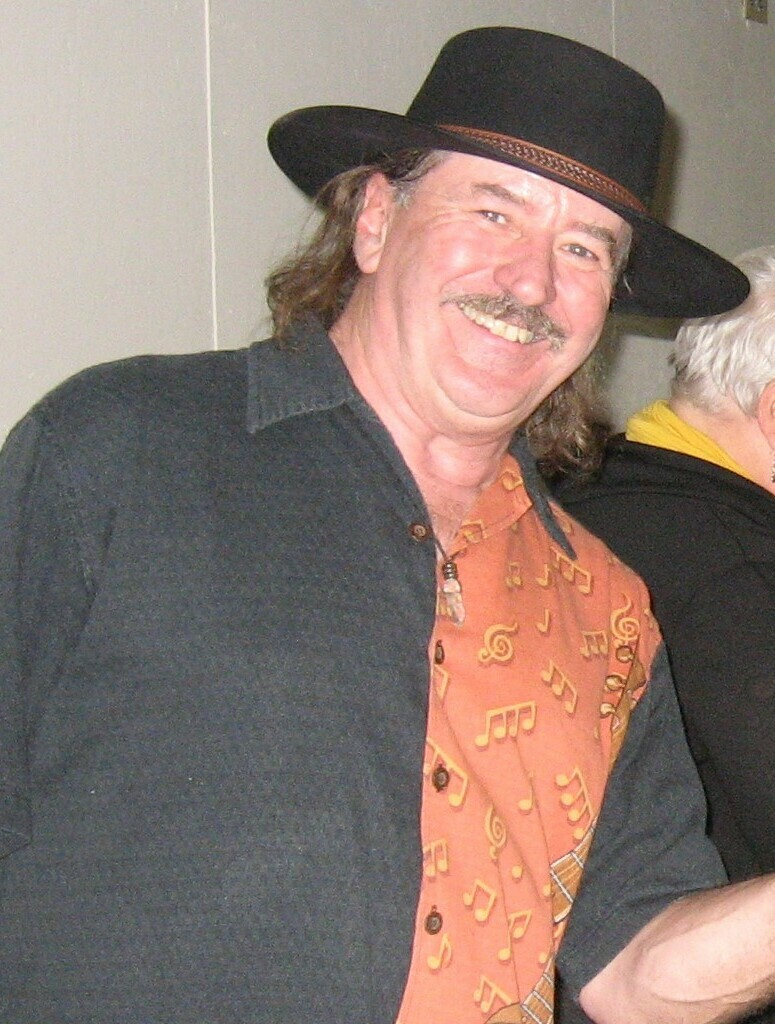
- Minglewood between sets at a MingleBells concert in Wallace, Nova Scotia

Background information
- Born: Roy Alexander Batherson; 31 January 1947 (age 79); Moncton, New Brunswick, Canada
- Origin: North Sydney, Nova Scotia, Canada
- Genres: Country, blues, folk, roots, rock
- Occupations: Singer-songwriter, musician
- Years active: 1966–present
- Label: Savannah Records
- Website: mattminglewood.com

Matt Minglewood (born Roy Alexander Batherson, 31 January 1947) is a Canadian musician whose style can be described as a blend of country, blues, folk, roots, and rock. The name "Matt" was borrowed from his brother, Matt Batherson.

== Career ==
Born in Moncton, New Brunswick, Minglewood later relocated to North Sydney, Nova Scotia with his family. He later moved to nearby Glace Bay, Nova Scotia where he resides to the present day. His nephew Norm Batherson played hockey professionally, and his grand-nephew Drake Batherson is currently a right winger for the Ottawa Senators of the National Hockey League and his grand-niece Mae Batherson plays for the Minnesota Frost of the Professional Women's Hockey League.

Minglewood joined his first band, the Rockin' Saints, when he was in his late teens, playing local high school dances, and even tavern gigs before he was old enough to get into bars. He played organ and rhythm guitar.

When he was in his early twenties he was part of a band called 'Sam Moon, Matt Minglewood & The Universal Power'. The group was formed in 1969 with Sam Moon and Minglewood sharing vocal duties. The band soon changed their name to Moon – Minglewood and performed regularly in the Halifax/Dartmouth metro area, becoming a staple at local high school dances in the area.

Minglewood briefly sang lead vocals and played guitar for Pepper Tree, then formed Cold Duck, and then in 1974 formed The Minglewood Band, a band which toured Canada extensively and achieved a measure of national success. The Minglewood Band recorded their first album with Solar Records in 1975. Soon after the album was released they signed a major label deal with RCA Records. The group received a 1980 Juno Award nomination for the Most Promising Group of the Year.

From 1984 to 1985, Minglewood took a sabbatical before launching a solo career. In the mid 1980s to early 1990s, he was also part of an annual seasonal troupe called the Cape Breton Summertime Revue, consisting of about 12 members performing musical and comedy skits for all ages throughout the Maritimes. Over his career he has won and been nominated for numerous East Coast Music Awards, Canadian Country Music Awards and Juno Awards. In 2013, he received the Blues With a Feeling Lifetime Achievement Award at the 16th annual Maple Blues Awards in Toronto. In January 2020, Music Nova Scotia and Casino Nova Scotia announced his induction to the Casino Nova Scotia Music Hall of Fame.

On 4 July 2019, Minglewood suffered an eye injury which left him temporarily blind in his left eye.

== Discography ==
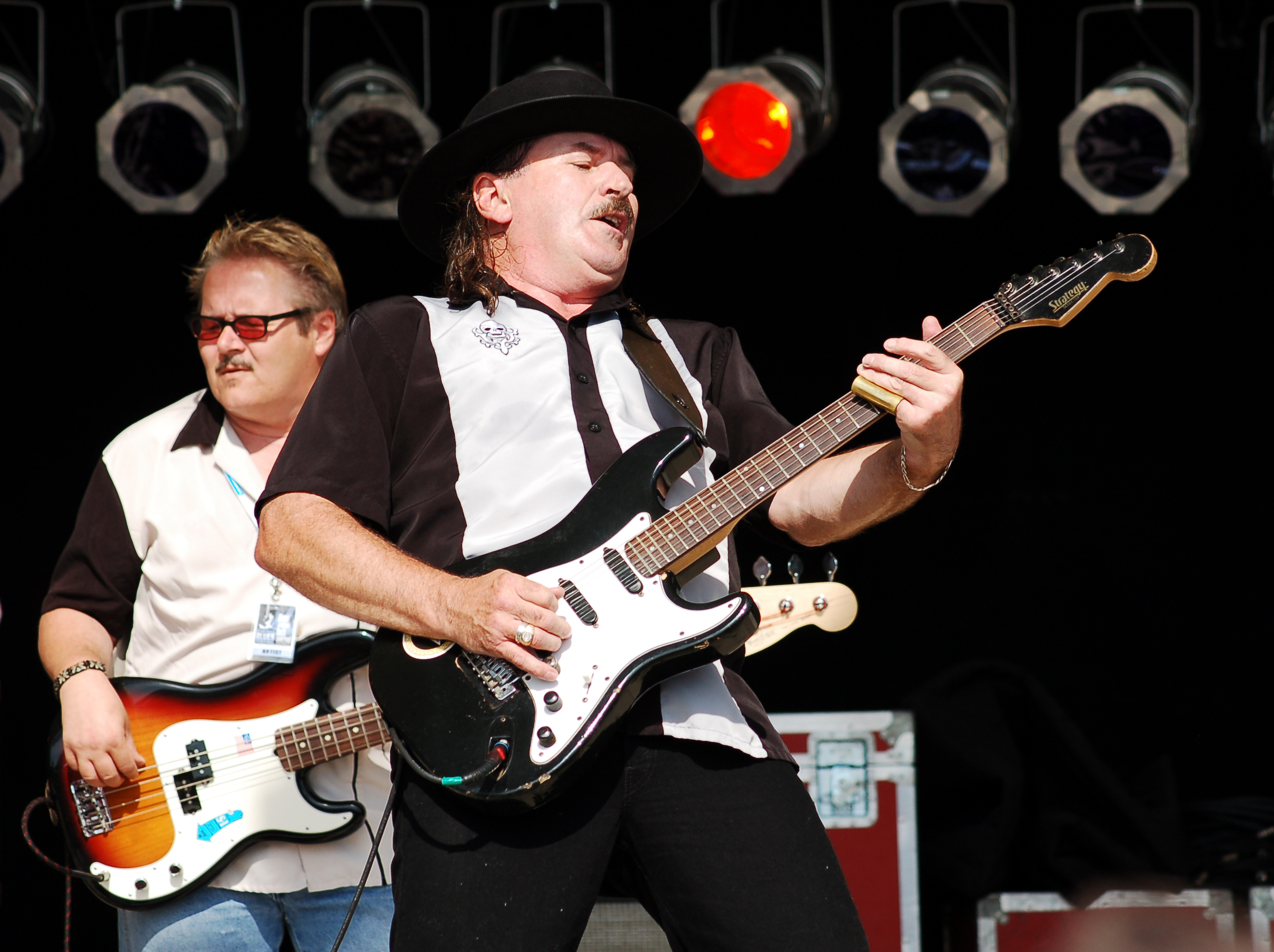
Minglewood performing in 2007

=== Albums ===
| Year | Album | CAN |
|---|---|---|
| 1975 | Minglewood Band | |
| 1979 | Minglewood Band | 60 |
| 1980 | Movin | 57 |
| 1981 | Out on a Limb | 40 |
| 1982 | M5 | |
| 1984 | Smokers | |
| 1986 | Me and the Boys | |
| 1988 | The Promise | |
| 1999 | Drivin' Wheel | |
| 2003 | Live at Last | |
| 2005 | The Story | |
| 2017 | Fly Like Desperados | |

=== Singles ===
| Year | Single | Chart Positions | | Album |
| Year | Single | CAN Country | CAN | Album |
|---|---|---|---|---|
| 1979 | "Ain't What It Used To Be" | — | 84 | Minglewood Band |
| 1985 | "Livin' Outside of the Law" | 41 | — | Me and the Boys |
| 1985 | "Me and the Boys" | — | 94 | Me and the Boys |
| 1986 | "Georgia on a Fast Train" | 24 | — | Me and the Boys |
| 1987 | "Cajun Stars" | 34 | — | The Promise |
| 1988 | "You Win Again" | 30 | — | The Promise |
| 1988 | "Someday I'm Gonna Ride in a Cadillac" | 10 | — | The Promise |

=== Music videos ===
| Year | Video |
|---|---|
| 1985 | "Me and the Boys" |
