= Sundown Recorders =

Sundown Recorders was a recording studio located in Edmonton, Canada, owned by Canadian recording artist and producer Wes Dakus, that existed from 1972 to 1987. A number of notable Canadian and American artists recorded at the studio, including Hoyt Axton, One Horse Blue, Bobby Curtola, Gary Fjellgaard and Fosterchild.

== History ==
Previously known as Park Lane Studios, Sundown Recorders was opened in 1972 by Wes Dakus, an Edmonton-based musician who had achieved national success in the 1960s as Wes Dakus & The Rebels, one of Canada's preeminent instrumental groups. The studio existed until 1987. In 1992, many of its audio tapes were donated to the Provincial Archives of Alberta by musician Jan Randall. Included in the donated material were recordings from the 1970s and 1980s by Hoyt Axton, Bobby Curtola, Gaye Delorme, Gary Fjellgaard, Fosterchild, Hammersmith, Sherry Kennedy, Randy Lloyd, Mavis McCauley, The Models and One Horse Blue, dating from the 1980s. Many of the artists recording at Sundown Recorders were also signed to Vera Cruz Records, which was also owned by Wes Dakus. The studio was integral to the lives of many musicians, and included a sleeping area for musicians who had nowhere else to go.
