= Baby Don't Cry =

Baby Don't Cry may refer to:

- "Baby Don't Cry" (Namie Amuro song), 2007
- "Baby Don't Cry" (INXS song), 1992
- "Baby Don't Cry" (One Horse Blue song), 1994
- "Baby, Don't Cry", an Exo song from XOXO, 2013
- "Baby Don't Cry (Keep Ya Head Up II)", a posthumous 1999 song by Tupac Shakur
- Baby Dont Cry, a South Korean girl group

== See also ==
- "Don't Cry Baby", a song written by Saul Bernie, James P. Johnson and Stella Unger, originally performed by Bessie Smith
