= Wes Dakus =

Canadian musician

- Born: Wesley Dakus; April 2, 1938
- Died: August 18, 2013 (age 75)
- Genres: rock 'n' roll
- Occupations: Singer, songwriter
- Instruments: vocals, guitar
- Years active: 1958–68
- Labels: Quality Records (Canada), Gallio (US), Capitol Records (Canada), United Artists (US), Kapp (US)
- Formerly of: Buddy Knox; The Fireballs; The Nomads; Barry Allen; Dundeeville Players

Wesley "Wes" Dakus (April 2, 1938 – August 18, 2013) was a Canadian musician and the leader of Wes Dakus and the Rebels, Canada's most popular instrumental group of the 1960s.

== Wes Dakus and the Rebels ==
Dakus was born in Mannville, Alberta, and in 1958 formed Wes Dakus and the Club 93 Rebels. Shortening to simply "The Rebels", band members included Barry Allen, Stu Mitchell, Gerry Dere, Dennis Planidin (aka Dennis Paul), Bob Clarke, and Maurice Marshall. In 1960, they were signed with Quality Records, and released their first album in the same year titled El Ringo. The group began recording with Norman Petty in his Clovis, New Mexico studio in early 1963, resulting in 10 singles for Capitol Canada and 2 LPs. A brief trip through California had them recording 2 tracks for the Gallio label "Surfs U Rite / Dog Food" released in 1963.

In 1965 The Wes Dakus Album – With The Rebels was released and helped the band create several singles. In 1967 their album was issued on KAPP as "Wes Dakus's Rebels". In Canada, the album was split into singles. RPM voted the band "Top Instrumental Group" in 1964 and 1965. The group disbanded in the summer of 1967. The 1968 single "New Sound Of Wes Dakus" had no band involvement whatsoever and was a group of session musicians from Gary Paxton Studios who had recorded demos. Wes licensed two instrumental tracks from his Paxton sessions to complete his Capitol contract.

== Sundown Recorders and Vera Cruz Records ==
In 1972, Dakus opened a recording studio called Sundown Recorders in Edmonton, Alberta. The studio existed from 1972 to 1987, after which many of its audio tapes were donated to the Provincial Archives of Alberta. Artists who recorded there included Hoyt Axton, One Horse Blue, Bobby Curtola, Gary Fjellgaard, and Fosterchild. During the 1978–1982 period, Dakus also owned Vera Cruz Records, releasing albums by One Horse Blue, Fosterchild, Bryan Fustukian, Hoyt Axton, and Don Everly, among others.

== Later career ==
Dakus still dabbled with music projects while residing in British Columbia. His last public appearance was at the Alberta Rock Reunion held in Edmonton in October 2006. CDs of his 1960s output have been released on the Super Oldies label, with more unissued material to be released in the future.

Dakus suffered from health complications after a stroke in 2011, and died on August 18, 2013, in Vancouver from a cancerous brain tumor that had spread quickly.

== Discography ==
=== Singles ===
Year	Artist Credit	Title	Peak chart position
Year	Artist Credit	Title	CAN
1960	The Club 93 Rebels	"Pink Canary"	—
1960	Wes Dakus & The Club 93 Rebels	"Taboo"	—
1960	Wes Dakus & The Club 93 Rebels	"El Ringo"	—
1962	Wes Dakus & The Rebels	"Cavalier Twist"	—
1963	Wes Dakus & The Rebels	"Dog Food"	—
1964	Wes Dakus	"Side Winder"	—
1964	Wes Dakus	"Las Vegas Scene"	23
1965	Wes Dakus	"Hobo"	9
1965	Wes Dakus	"She Ain't No Angel"	—
1965	Wes Dakus	"Come On Down"	—
1965	Wes Dakus	"The Hoochi Coochi Coo"	4
1966	Wes Dakus	"(We've Got A) Groovey Thing Going"	77
1967	Wes Dakus	"Mama's Boy"	—
1967	Wes Dakus	"Shotgun"	54
1967	Wes Dakus & The Rebels	"Come On In"	—
1968	Wes Dakus' Rebels	"Casting My Spell"	—
1968	The New Sound of Wes Dakus	"Organized"	—

=== Albums ===
- 1965
  - The Wes Dakus Album – With The Rebels (Capitol)
- 1967
  - Wes Dakus & The Rebels (Kapp)

2006

  - Wes Dakus & The Rebels – Volume 1 (Super Oldies)
- 2007
  - Wes Dakus & The Rebels – Volume 2 (Super Oldies)
- 2012
  - Wes Dakus & The Rebels – Volume 3 (Super Oldies)
