= Bringing Back Your Love =

Single by One Horse Blue

from the album One Horse Blue
- Released: 1995
- Genre: Country
- Length: 4:08
- Label: Savannah
- Songwriter: Brent Shindel
- Producer: Bill Buckingham

One Horse Blue singles chronology
| "Hopeless Love" (1995) | "Bringing Back Your Love" (1995) |

"Bringing Back Your Love" is a single by Canadian country music group One Horse Blue. Released in 1995, it was the eighth single from their 1993 album One Horse Blue. The song reached #1 on the RPM Country Tracks chart in July 1995.

== Chart performance ==
| Chart (1995) | Peak position |
|---|---|
| Canada Country Singles (RPM) | 1 |

=== Year-end charts ===
| Chart (1995) | Position |
|---|---|
| Canada Country Tracks (RPM) | 25 |
