= Hopeless Love =

Single by One Horse Blue

from the album One Horse Blue
- Released: 1995
- Genre: Country
- Length: 2:53
- Label: Savannah
- Songwriters: Gord Maxwell; Brian Fowler
- Producer: Bill Buckingham

One Horse Blue singles chronology
"Everything Money Can Buy" (1994)	"Hopeless Love" (1995)	"Bringing Back Your Love" (1995)

"Hopeless Love" is a single by Canadian country music group One Horse Blue. Released in 1995, it was the seventh single from their album One Horse Blue. The song reached #1 on the RPM Country Tracks chart in March 1995.

== Chart performance ==
Chart (1995)	Peak position
Canada Country Singles (RPM)	1

=== Year-end charts ===
Chart (1995)	Position
Canada Country Tracks (RPM)	46
