= Dorn Beattie =

Canadian rock and country singer

Dorn (Doran) Beattie
- Also known as: Doran Beattie
- Born: Dorn Beattie; Calgary, Alberta, Canada
- Genres: Rock; Country
- Occupations: Musician, entrepreneur, inventor
- Instrument: Guitar
- Labels: Warner Elektra, Polygram, QWest
- Website: www.dornbeattie.ca

Dorn (Doran) Beattie is a Canadian rock and country singer, who was associated with the bands 49th Parallel, Painter and Hammersmith in the 1970s before retiring from music.

Painter's hit record "West Coast Woman" on Elektra rose quickly on the world pop charts in 1973.

Beattie subsequently reemerged in 1994 as a solo country artist with the album Fear of Flying. Country Music News listed the album's title track as No. 46 on the year-end Canadian country singles chart for 1994.
