= Gaye Delorme =

Canadian musical artist (1947–2011)

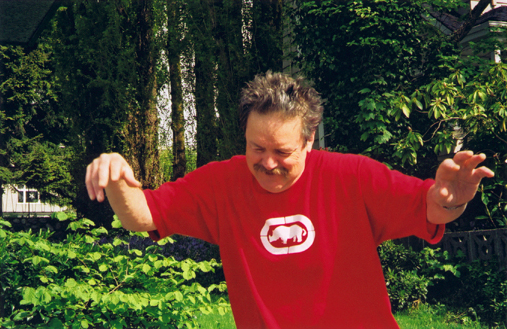
- Delorme in 2008

Background information
- Born: March 20, 1947; Thunder Bay, Ontario, Canada
- Origin: Edmonton, Alberta, Canada
- Died: June 24, 2011 (aged 64); Calgary, Alberta, Canada
- Occupation(s): Songwriter, composer, guitarist
- Years active: Early 1970s – 2011
- Labels: Session guitarist for CTI Records NYC 1970s
- Formerly of: Skylark

Gaye James Delorme (March 20, 1947 – June 24, 2011) was a Canadian songwriter, composer and guitar player.

== Biography ==
"Although his name is generally first associated as the writer of 'The Rodeo Song', an expletive-filled cowboy anthem made famous by Showdown, Gaye Delorme's career also developed into one of the most versatile in Canada, making him one of the most sought after studio musicians, live guitarists and producer or writers."

Dan Brisebois, Biography of Gaye Delorme

"Considered one of the greatest guitarists Edmonton has ever seen, if not all of Canada, Delorme was a master of flamenco guitar – among several other things – which he started learning at the age of 14 in reform school, where music apparently saved him from a life of crime."

Mike Ross, 2011

Born in Thunder Bay, Ontario, Delorme grew up in Edmonton, Alberta, and lived primarily in western Canada until his death.

Delorme was able to play many styles of guitar music including flamenco, classical, jazz (in the styles of Django Reinhardt and Wes Montgomery), country, blues, rock and heavy metal. His wide-ranging skill as a guitarist included the ability to emulate other instruments such as the sitar and the koto. Stevie Ray Vaughan described Delorme as "one of the best".

Delorme was entirely self-taught, having picked up the guitar aged 15 during a stint in juvenile detention. By 1967, at the age of 19, Delorme had already developed a reputation as a professional musician in Edmonton. Around that time, he left for the music scene in Toronto.

In the early 1970s, Delorme led a Jimi Hendrix-styled power trio called The Window in Edmonton, Alberta. He later moved from Edmonton to Calgary and played in country bands there for a few years. He then formed another trio to play his original rock and blues-oriented tunes, to play the dance club scene in Alberta. Delorme also became a record producer, producing the first demos for Calgary-based band Fosterchild, at Edmonton's Sundown Recorders, owned by Wes Dakus.

After a brief move to Vancouver, Delorme returned to Edmonton in the 1990s and was a mainstay at the Sidetrack Cafe where he developed a Latin fusion style that at one point featured Gaye leading a 10-piece band with a horn section. (Also in the 1990s, he first learned how to read music.) From roughly 2000 to 2009, Gaye lived in Vancouver and focused on his writing, recordings and concerts, often appearing solo. All of Delorme's recordings were released on his own label, Aqua Tarta Music. He also performed as a studio musician for a variety of recording artists. In 2009, Gaye moved back to Edmonton.

=== Collaborations ===
Delorme played with many musicians and groups including Jann Arden, the Powder Blues Band, Lenny Breau, David Foster, Airto Moreira, Billy Cobham and Stanley Clarke. In 2006 he was accompanied by the Edmonton Symphony Orchestra for his performance of Joaquín Rodrigo's Concierto de Aranjuez. 1986 saw Delorme record a one-hour special for CBC Television entitled Gaye Delorme in Concert. As well as composing and playing guitar, he produced k.d. lang's first album A Truly Western Experience, in addition to his previously referenced production work with Fosterchild.

=== The L.A. Years ===
Delorme first came to Los Angeles at the initiative of David Foster, then a member of Skylark. The band had lost its guitarist and Delorme was selected as the replacement. During the 1970s and 1980s, Delorme lived in Los Angeles, collaborating frequently with Cheech and Chong, most notably writing the signature guitar riff for Cheech and Chong's anthem "Earache My Eye". The immediately recognizable guitar riff became part of the modern musical lexicon, with numerous covers of "Earache My Eye" recorded by heavy metal, punk and even hip-hop artists. His long-running association with Cheech and Chong included musical contributions to Cheech and Chong's Next Movie (1980) and culminated with Delorme scoring their film Things Are Tough All Over (1982). The drug- and alcohol-fueled atmosphere of LA was taking a heavy toll on Delorme by the mid-1980s, so he moved back to his native Canada.

=== Comedy ===
Delorme was often involved in Cheech and Chong's improvised writing process, and humor was integral to his audience rapport during live performances. His own comedy caused a buzz in 1980 when "The Rodeo Song" was released by Garry Lee and the Showdown. The single resulted in a CRIA double-platinum record. The song quickly became a cult favorite and was compiled by Dr. Demento on Demento's Mementos and was used in the Stephen King film Sleepwalkers (1992). Delorme's own version of "The Rodeo Song" was released on the album Rodeo Songs in 2002.

Delorme was never invited to any of Cheech & Chong's reunion concerts; when they came to Vancouver, they never mentioned Delorme's participation in "Earache My Eye". One night after a gig, leaving New Westminster Skytrain station, he was attacked and beaten by a group of muggers, causing him to suffer a stroke; the thugs also stole his guitar, which has never been recovered. The Yale Hotel held several benefits to help pay Delorme's medical bills.

=== Awards ===
Delorme was nominated for a Grammy Award and received the Alberta Premier's Award For Excellence for his lifelong commitment to furthering Alberta musical talent.

=== Later life and death ===
In 2000, Delorme was the inaugural artist to be honoured by the Pacific Coast Music Association in its Celebrate series. Delorme was a diabetic and had become legally blind from the disease, as of 2008. He died of a heart attack in Calgary during the early hours of June 24, 2011, while staying at the home of a friend. He was 64 years old and was due to perform at the Calgary Bluesfest Warmup on June 25, 2011, with his longtime sideman, keyboardist Peter Sweetzir.

== Discography ==
- American Jumbo – Beautiful Guitar Vol. 2 (2008) Aqua Tarta
- Borderline (2002) Aqua Tarta
- Delorme (2002) Aqua Tarta
- Rodeo Songs (2002) Aqua Tarta
- The Best of Gaye Delorme (1999) Aqua Tarta
- Beautiful Guitar (1998) Aqua Tarta
- Blue Wave Sessions (1990) Aqua Tarta
