= Love's Looking for Me =

Single by One Horse Blue

from the album One Horse Blue
- Released: 1993
- Genre: Country
- Length: 3:05
- Label: Savannah
- Songwriters: Michael Shellard; Sharon Anderson
- Producer: Bill Buckingham

One Horse Blue singles chronology
"Starting All Over Again" (1993)	"Love's Looking for Me" (1993)	"Baby Don't Cry" (1994)

"Love's Looking for Me" is a song recorded by Canadian country music group One Horse Blue. It was released in 1993 as the fourth single from their fifth studio album, One Horse Blue. It peaked at number 10 on the RPM Country Tracks chart in February 1994.

== Chart performance ==
Chart (1993–1994)	Peak position
Canada Country Singles (RPM)	10
