= One Horse Blue (1993 album) =

Studio album by One Horse Blue
- Released: 1993
- Genre: Country
- Label: Savannah
- Producer: Bill Buckingham

One Horse Blue chronology
| On the Street (1982) | One Horse Blue (1993) |

One Horse Blue is the fifth and final studio album by Canadian country music group One Horse Blue. It was released by Savannah Records in 1993. The album peaked at number 4 on the RPM Country Albums chart.

== Track listing ==
1. "Starting All Over Again"
2. "Love's Looking for Me"
3. "Skyrocket"
4. "Baby Don't Cry"
5. "Everything Money Can Buy"
6. "Bringing Back Your Love"
7. "Hopeless Love"
8. "Don't Lose Sight"
9. "Devil's Train"
10. "You're Always Right"
11. "The Man Walks Alone"
12. "Colours of Love"
13. "Ride the Wind"

== Chart performance ==
| Chart (1993) | Peak position |
|---|---|
| Canadian RPM Country Albums | 4 |
