= Starting All Over Again (One Horse Blue song) =

Single by One Horse Blue

from the album One Horse Blue
- Released: 1993
- Genre: Country
- Length: 3:51
- Label: Savannah
- Songwriters: Andreas Schuld; John Witmer
- Producer: Bill Buckingham

One Horse Blue singles chronology
"Colours of Love" (1990)	"Starting All Over Again" (1993)	"Love's Looking for Me" (1994)

"Starting All Over Again" is a song recorded by Canadian country music group One Horse Blue. It was released in 1993 as the third single from their fifth studio album, One Horse Blue. It peaked at number 7 on the RPM Country Tracks chart in October 1993.

== Chart performance ==
=== Weekly charts ===
Chart (1993)	Peak position
Canada Country Singles (RPM)	7

=== Year-end charts ===
Chart (1993)	Position
Canada Country Tracks (RPM)	94
