= Barry Allen (musician) =

Canadian musician (1945–2020)

Background information
- Born: July 29, 1945; Edmonton, Alberta, Canada
- Died: April 4, 2020 (aged 74)
- Genres: Rock music
- Instruments: Guitar, Vocals
- Formerly of: Painter

Barry Allen Rasmussen (July 29, 1945 – April 4, 2020), known professionally as Barry Allen, was a Canadian rock musician and record producer/engineer.

== Career ==
His career in music began as a guitarist and backup singer for Wes Dakus & The Rebels. In the early 1960s, producer Norman Petty noted his lead vocal abilities and just as he had done with having two entities for Buddy Holly & The Crickets, secured recording contracts recordings for both Wes Dakus & The Rebels, and solo releases for Barry. In 1965, Allen signed with Capitol Records in Canada, and Dot Records in the U.S.A; that year, he won Canada's Gold Leaf Award for Most Promising Male Vocalist.

In 1966, the title track from his second album, Lovedrops, went gold. In 1967, he recorded two more singles; however, sales figures were not to Capitol's liking, and he was released from this contract. Barry's last project with Norman Petty was released on the Canadian 'Barry Records' label in 1969. In 1970, he released a third album, this time produced by Randy Bachman and Wes Dakus via MCA Records. In 1970 he also hosted a television show out of Calgary called 'Come Together' with various Canadian bands and his own band 'Cheyenne Winter'. By 1973 Barry was the rhythm guitarist and vocalist in the band Painter. The Painter album (released in the U.S. on Elektra Records) and the single from it, "West Coast Woman" were released in 1973.

Shawn Nagy's Super Oldies label reissued Allen's original material along with unreleased tracks on a two-CD set "Clovis Collection" in 2012, with a CD Release Concert reuniting Barry with Stu Mitchell, Dennis Paul & Gerry Dere of "The Rebels" in their first show together in over 20 years. It was a sold-out event held at the Century Casino in Edmonton on March 10, 2012.

Allen then formed the "New Rebels" with local musicians to do the occasional performance. A stereo reissue of "Goin' Places" was released in 2013, followed by "Love Drops" in 2016. He returned to solo recording with "Speed Of Dark" released in November 2019.

Allen revealed that he had recently overcome a bout with cancer and that his January 21, 2017 show may have been one of his final shows. He died on April 4, 2020, aged 74.

== Discography ==
=== Singles ===
(Rankings from RPM Magazine)

Easy Come, Easy Go ......................... #14 (1965)

It's Alright With Me Now ...................... #12 (1965)

Love Drops ......................................... #10 (1966)

Turn Her Down .................................... #22 (1966)

Armful of Teddy Bears ......................... #32 (1967)

I Know (You Don't Want Me Anymore)... #68 (1967)

Wednesday In Your Garden ................. #91 (1970)
