= Jim Foster (musician) =

Canadian singer, songwriter, guitarist, and harmonica player

James Edwin Foster (born August 28, 1950) is a Canadian singer, songwriter, guitarist, and harmonica player.

== Biography ==
Born in Victoria, British Columbia, Foster is best known for his Canadian singles "X-Ray Eyes" and his work with his band, Fosterchild, which existed from 1976 to 1980. In 1993, Foster joined the band One Horse Blue. Foster has had success in the adult contemporary, country, and rock-music fields, writing such songs as "Here We Go Again" for Patricia Conroy (1993), and the Western Canadian Music Award-winning "X-Ray Eyes" (1986). He also co-wrote "I Put Away My Gun" with Murray McLauchlan.

== Awards ==
Western Canada Music Awards 1986

== Discography ==
Albums

Year	Album	Position	Weeks	Label
1977	Fosterchild	72	11	CBS
1978	Troubled Child	84	10	CBS
1980	On The Prowl	-	-	Vera Cruz
	Solo Albums			
1986	Power Lines	86	16	RCA
1998	Artist's Print	-	-	No Label
2011	Lone Bird	-	-	Quest
2013	A Sailor's Advice			Quest
2015	6 Foot Ladder			Quest

Singles

Year	Song	Position	Weeks	Label
1977	"Let Me Down Easy"	72	11	CBS
1978	"Until We Meet Again"	84	10	CBS
1978	"I Need Somebody Tonight"	59	14	CBS
1978	"It's Too Late Now"	40	4	CBS
1986	"X-Ray Eyes"	86	16	RCA

== See also ==
- One Horse Blue
