= Dennis Vial =

- Born: April 10, 1969 (age 57) Sault Ste. Marie, Ontario, Canada
- Height: 6 ft 1 in (185 cm)
- Weight: 200 lb (91 kg; 14 st 4 lb)
- Position: Defence
- Shot: Left
- Played for: New York Rangers; Detroit Red Wings; Ottawa Senators; Sheffield Steelers
- NHL draft: 110th overall, 1988; New York Rangers
- Playing career: 1989–2005

Dennis Vial (born April 10, 1969) is a Canadian former professional ice hockey player. Vial played in the National Hockey League (NHL) with the New York Rangers, Detroit Red Wings, and Ottawa Senators. He also played in the North American minor leagues and European leagues. He played defence and was known for his toughness.

== Career ==
After playing with the Hamilton Steelhawks in the OHL for 3 years, Vial was drafted by the New York Rangers in the 6th round, 110th overall in the 1988 NHL entry draft. That year he went back to the OHL and played with the Niagara Falls Thunder, followed by a year with the Flint Spirits in the IHL for the 1989–1990 season, scoring 35 points in 79 games and registering 351 penalty minutes. Throughout this time Vial established himself as a hard hitting enforcer and defenceman. He got the call up midway through the 1990–1991 season to join the Rangers. He played in 21 games before being traded to the Detroit Red Wings that same season, appearing in another 9 games. Vial then split the next two seasons between the Red Wings and the Adirondack Red Wings of the AHL.

Prior to the 1993–1994 season Vial was traded from the Red Wings to the Tampa Bay Lightning. He was left unprotected in the 1993 NHL Expansion Draft and was picked up by the Mighty Ducks of Anaheim a few weeks later. Finally, in Phase II of the Expansion draft Vial was picked up by the Ottawa Senators, with whom he made his greatest NHL impact. With a Senators' lineup scarce in talent, Vial was able to make the team and play full-time, and in 1993-94 he was given the team's Frank Finnigan Award as its most improved player. He led the Senators in penalty minutes, major penalties, and fighting majors. Known as a fearless combatant, Vial's time in Ottawa was highlighted by a long, intense, and often bloody feud with Rob Ray of the divisional rival Buffalo Sabres.

However, Vial's aggressive and all-out playing style resulted in many injuries throughout his career and he played in at least half of the games in a season only twice. His last season in the NHL was 1997–1998.

For the next seven seasons Vial played with a number of minor league teams including two years in England in the BISL. He retired following the 2004–2005 season where he played in the UHL with the Missouri River Otters and Richmond Riverdogs.

Vial remained the Ottawa Senators' all-time penalty minutes leader until being surpassed by Chris Neil.

== British Ice Hockey League Brawl/Suspension ==
In 2001, while a member of the British Ice Hockey League's Sheffield Steelers, Vial incited a much publicized brawl against the Nottingham Panthers which resulted in the league handing out several suspensions totaling 28 games and fines worth £8,400 ($18,750). Vial was suspended for six games and fined £750 ($1,675 Cdn) for numerous offences, including instigating the brawl by cross-checking Nottingham's Greg Hadden, and squirting water at fans in the stands.

Britain's Press Association described the event, which escalated into a 36-man bench clearing brawl, as "one of the worst scenes of violence ever seen at a British ice hockey rink."

== Other ==
Vial currently resides just outside Halifax, Nova Scotia. Vial is the brother-in-law of former player Norm Batherson and the uncle of professional ice hockey players Drake Batherson and Mae Batherson.

== Career statistics ==
			Regular season					Playoffs
Season	Team	League	GP	G	A	Pts	PIM	GP	G	A	Pts	PIM
1985–86	Hamilton Kilty B's	GHL	27	11	7	18	215	—	—	—	—	—
1985–86	Hamilton Steelhawks	OHL	31	1	1	2	66	—	—	—	—	—
1986–87	Hamilton Steelhawks	OHL	53	1	8	9	194	8	0	0	0	8
1987–88	Hamilton Steelhawks	OHL	52	3	17	20	229	13	2	2	4	49
1988–89	Niagara Falls Thunder	OHL	50	10	27	37	230	15	1	7	8	44
1989–90	Flint Spirits	IHL	79	6	29	35	351	4	0	0	0	10
1990–91	Binghamton Rangers	AHL	40	2	7	9	250	—	—	—	—	—
1990–91	New York Rangers	NHL	21	0	0	0	61	—	—	—	—	—
1990–91	Detroit Red Wings	NHL	9	0	0	0	16	—	—	—	—	—
1991–92	Adirondack Red Wings	AHL	20	2	4	6	107	17	1	3	4	43
1991–92	Detroit Red Wings	NHL	27	1	0	1	72	—	—	—	—	—
1992–93	Adirondack Red Wings	AHL	30	2	11	13	177	11	1	1	2	14
1992–93	Detroit Red Wings	NHL	9	0	1	1	20	—	—	—	—	—
1993–94	Ottawa Senators	NHL	55	2	5	7	214	—	—	—	—	—
1994–95	Ottawa Senators	NHL	27	0	4	4	65	—	—	—	—	—
1995–96	Ottawa Senators	NHL	64	1	4	5	276	—	—	—	—	—
1996–97	Ottawa Senators	NHL	11	0	1	1	25	—	—	—	—	—
1997–98	Chicago Wolves	IHL	24	1	3	4	86	1	0	0	0	2
1997–98	Ottawa Senators	NHL	19	0	0	0	45	—	—	—	—	—
1998–99	Chicago Wolves	IHL	55	1	4	5	213	—	—	—	—	—
1999–00	Sheffield Steelers	BISL	26	2	5	7	82	7	0	1	1	10
2000–01	Sheffield Steelers	BISL	42	3	7	10	171	8	0	2	2	20
2001–02	Columbia Inferno	ECHL	68	8	11	19	137	5	0	0	0	4
2002–03	Columbia Inferno	ECHL	69	3	15	18	158	17	0	1	1	27
2002–03	Verdun Dragons	QSPHL	2	1	0	1	7	—	—	—	—	—
2003–04	Columbia Inferno	ECHL	54	5	15	20	101	4	0	0	0	20
2004–05	Missouri River Otters	UHL	46	0	4	4	66	—	—	—	—	—
2004–05	Richmond Riverdogs	UHL	29	1	7	8	19	—	—	—	—	—
IHL totals			158	8	36	44	650	5	0	0	0	12
NHL totals			242	4	15	19	794	—	—	—	—	—
ECHL totals			191	16	41	57	396	26	0	1	1	51
