= Garry Lee and the Showdown =

Country band from Medicine Hat, Alberta, Canada

Garry Lee and Showdown
- Origin: Canada
- Genres: Country, country rock, bluegrass, comedy
- Labels: Damon Studios, SoundTrek
- Members: Garry Lee Berthold; Charles Holley; Paul McLellan; Kelly La Rocque; Wolf Rick Patterson

Garry Lee and Showdown are a country band from Medicine Hat, Alberta, Canada. They are best known for their underground hit song "The Rodeo Song" (written by Gaye Delorme) and featuring prominent use of profanity, from the 1980 album, Welcome to the Rodeo.

In 1993, after extensive airplay by Simon Bates on BBC Radio 1, the song was issued in the UK, and got to number 43 in the UK singles chart.

In a 2018 interview, the band members stated that they had heard Gaye Delorme play the song at a bar and decided to cover it, though royalties were not discussed.

== Studio albums ==
Year	Title		
Year	Title	CAN Country	
1980	Welcome To The Rodeo		Damon Records
1982	Wanted		Damon Records

== Singles ==
Year	Single		
Year	Single	CAN Country	UK
1982	"Rodeo Cowboy"	30	–
1993	"The Rodeo Song"	–	43

== Awards and nominations ==
=== Juno Awards ===
Year	Nominee / work	Award	Result
1983	Garry Lee and Showdown	Country Group or Duo of the Year	Nominated
