= Baby Don't Cry (One Horse Blue song) =

Single by One Horse Blue

from the album One Horse Blue
- Released: 1994
- Genre: Country
- Length: 4:06
- Label: Savannah
- Songwriters: Gord Maxwell; Rocko Vaugeois
- Producer: Bill Buckingham

One Horse Blue singles chronology
"Love's Looking for Me" (1993)	"Baby Don't Cry" (1994)	"Everything Money Can Buy" (1994)

"Baby Don't Cry" is a song recorded by Canadian country music group One Horse Blue. It was released in 1994 as the fifth single from their fifth studio album, One Horse Blue (1993). It peaked at number 6 on the RPM Country Tracks chart in May 1994.

== Chart performance ==
Chart (1994)	Peak position
Canada Country Singles (RPM)	6

=== Year-end charts ===
Chart (1994)	Position
Canada Country Tracks (RPM)	84
