= Bryan Fustukian =

Canadian singer-songwriter (born 1937)

Bryan Fustukian (born in Saint Boniface, Winnipeg) is a Canadian country music singer and songwriter. He is also notable as a former radio broadcaster and concert promoter. Under the stage name of Vik Armen, Fustukian initially developed his music career in pop music. He continues to perform and record country music as Bryan Fustukian and pop music as Vik Armen.

== History ==
Bryan Fustukian was born in Winnipeg, Manitoba, and spent his childhood in Edmonton, Alberta. Fustukian's first career was in radio. After appearing as a guest singer at an Edmonton all-night radio show, he was encouraged to become a radio broadcaster and to choose a new name to do so. He became Vik Armen.

Under the name Vik Armen, Fustukian was a radio station disc jockey in Winnipeg (CKRC), Edmonton (CHED and CJCA), Lethbridge (CHEC), Ottawa (CKOY), Toronto (CKEY) and Providence, Rhode Island.

As Vik Armen, Fustukian released a number of pop music singles in the 1960s. He would record his songs in the radio station studios where he was employed. One of his songs, "I'm Not In Your Dreams Anymore", released as "Not In Your Dreams" and recorded while he was a morning disc jockey at CJCA in Edmonton, became a number 1 local hit. The single was issued by Remlap Records, an independent label co-owned by Fustukian and a partner, who worked for Decca Records. Subsequent singles were released on Apex Records, which was then the Canadian label for Decca Records. One such release was "Kiss Me Quick", which was produced by Norman Petty in Clovis, New Mexico, backed by Wes Dakus and The Rebels.

In 1965, Fustukian moved to WPRO in Providence, Rhode Island, eventually becoming the music director at that station. During his tenure at WPRO, Fustukian was voted in Downbeat Magazine, for two consecutive years, as the most influential disc jockey on the Eastern Seaboard. Fustukian became a concert promoter, in addition to his radio association. Concerts produced by Fustukian included performances by Jimi Hendrix, Cream, Al Martino, Buck Owens, The Who, Blood, Sweat and Tears, The Rascals, Vanilla Fudge, The Mothers of Invention and Van Morrison. Among Fustukian's notable productions was the last live concert of Cream performed in North America, prior to the breakup of the band. Fustukian also produced and managed certain local artists during this period, working in part with New York producer Warren Schatz.

Fustukian initially left radio work in 1970, to devote himself exclusively to his music career. Fustukian returned to Canada in 1972, settling in Edmonton and recommencing his radio associations. During this period, he was associated with Edmonton radio stations CFRN, CKUA and CJAX-FM. Fustukian also commenced playing country music regularly, throughout Alberta. As of the mid-1970s, Billy Cowsill, formerly of The Cowsills, joined Fustukian's band as a guitarist and co-lead singer. Cowsill's childhood had been spent in Rhode Island, where Fustukian was a well-known radio personality. The two reconnected in Canada, where Cowsill chose to spend the majority of his life, and developed the balance of his career in music. It was also during this period that Fustukian signed with Jim Reeves Enterprises, as a songwriter and producer. In 1976, one of Fustukian's songs, released under the title "Singin' Lonesome Cowboy Songs", was released by Nashville recording artist George Kent.

Fustukian released his first album, Fustukian, in 1979, on Vera Cruz Records. The album was co-produced by Bryan Fustukian and Wes Dakus. He had previously released a single "Phyllis (Wait for the Wagon)", on Casino Records which had been a top 20 RPM single in 1976, and which was included on his 1979 album debut.

As of 1981, Fustukian commenced appearing in various films.

In 1999, Fustukian commenced performing again as Vik Armen, releasing Vik Armen Sings Again, as well as Vik Armen 1963-1967, his collected singles from the 1960s.

Subsequent to his radio career and in addition to his songwriting, performing and music production, Fustukian became the president of a voice over production studio, based in Edmonton.

== Discography ==
=== As Bryan Fustukian ===
==== Albums ====
- How the West Was Won (Fustukian and The Albertans) Dynasty, 2012
- Fustukian 2010
- A Fustukian Christmas 2008
- Road Work
- Fustukian 1973-1993
- Railroad Songs and Songs of The West
- Live at the Cook County Saloon (Fustukian and The Battle River Band)
- Always Battle River, 1980
- Fustukian Vera Cruz, 1979

==== Singles ====
Year	Single	Peak chart positions		Album
Year	Single	CAN Country	CAN AC	Album
1976	"Phyllis (Wait for the Wagon)"	21	—	Fustukian
1978	"Red River Valley"	—	50	Fustukian
1978	"You Win Again"	61	—	Fustukian
1979	"Lonesome Cowboy Song"	60	—	Fustukian
1982	"Always"	45	—	Always
"—" denotes releases that did not chart

=== As Vik Armen ===
==== Albums ====
- It's A Lonesome Old Town(HYE)
- Vik Armen 2010 (HYE)
- A Tribute to Tin Pan Alley(HYE)
- Vik Armen Sings Again (HYE), 1999
- Vik Armen 1963-1967 (HYE)

==== Singles ====
- It Takes A Lot Of Work, AirPlay Direct, 2014
- The Girl Who Never Smiled/Don't Wait 'Til Summer Comes Around(WPN).
- Kiss Me Quick/When My Little Girl Is Smiling Apex, 1964
- Really Terrific/Last Summer Apex, 1963
- Not In Your Dreams/Without Your Love Remlap, 1963

== Filmography ==
- 1981 - Silence of the North
- 1984 - Isaac Littlefeathers
- 1984 - Draw! (TV Movie)
- 1985 - Birds of Prey
- 1986 - Loyalties
- 1987 - The Gunfighters (TV Movie)
- 1994 - Road to Saddle River
- 1994 - Lonesome Dove: The Series (TV Series. Episode: "Ballad of a Gunfighter")
