= Drake Batherson =

Canadian ice hockey player (born 1998)

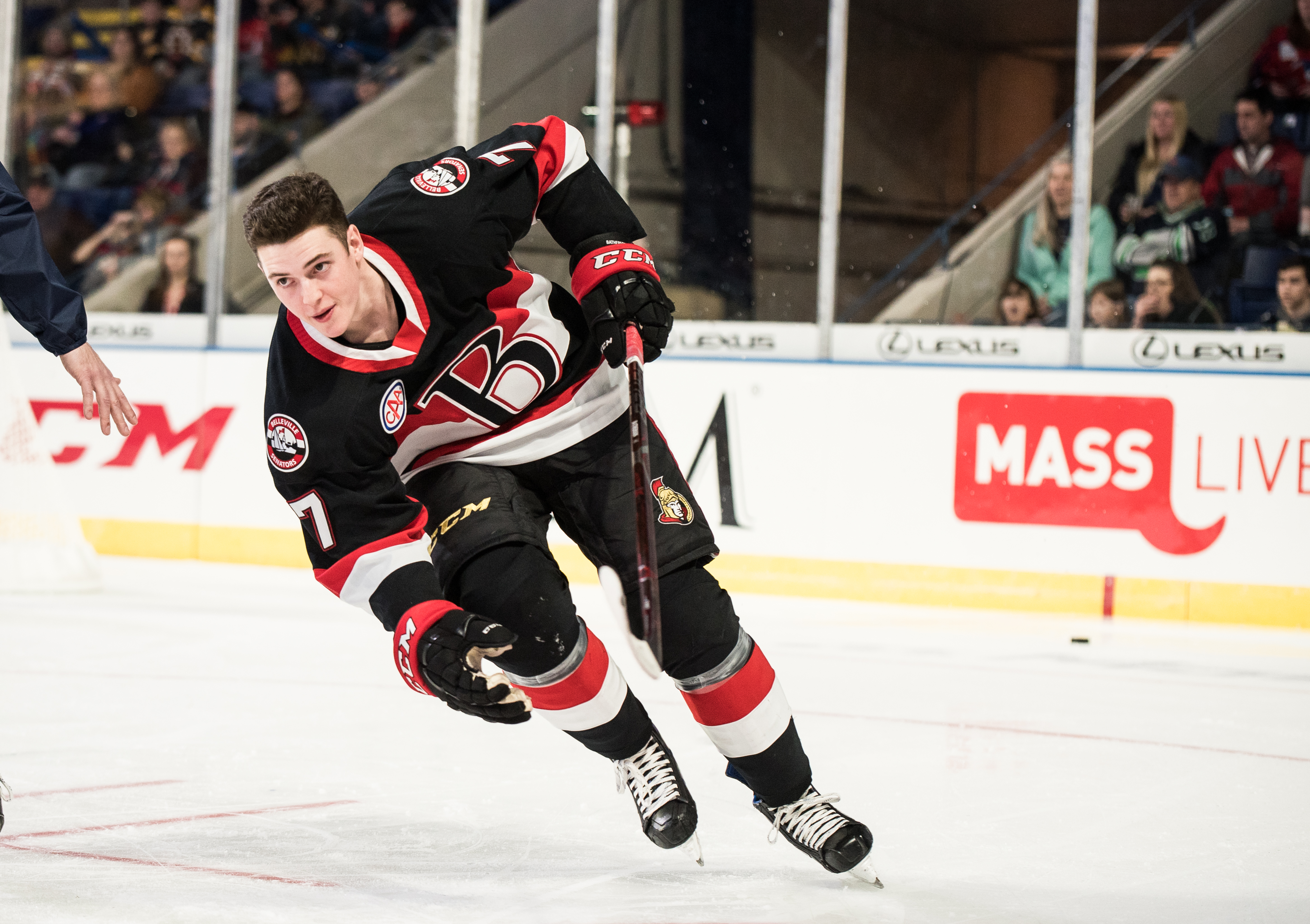
- Batherson with the Belleville Senators in 2019
- Born: April 27, 1998 (age 28) Fort Wayne, Indiana, U.S.
- Height: 6 ft 3 in (191 cm)
- Weight: 187 lb (85 kg; 13 st 5 lb)
- Position: Right wing
- Shoots: Right
- NHL team: Ottawa Senators
- National team: Canada
- NHL draft: 121st overall, 2017; Ottawa Senators
- Playing career: 2018–present

Drake Batherson (born April 27, 1998) is an American-born Canadian professional ice hockey player who is a right winger for the Ottawa Senators of the National Hockey League (NHL). He was drafted by the Ottawa Senators in the fourth round, 121st overall, of the 2017 NHL entry draft.

== Playing career ==
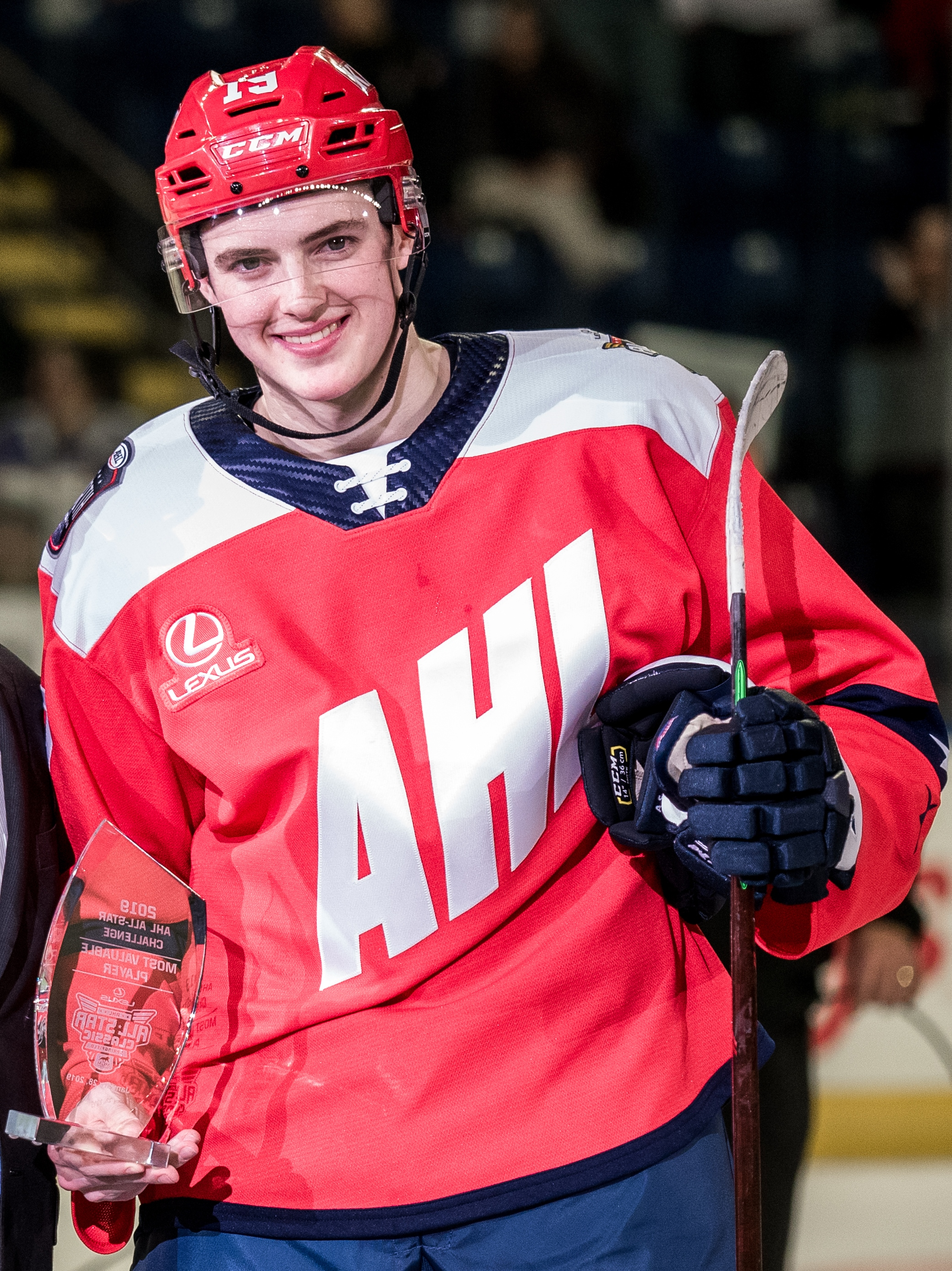
Batherson at the 2019 AHL All-Star Game

=== Amateur ===
Following the 2014–15 season with the Valley Wildcats, Batherson was selected by the Cape Breton Screaming Eagles of the Quebec Major Junior Hockey League (QMJHL) in the sixth round, 97th overall, of the 2015 QMJHL Entry Draft. In his first season of major junior hockey, he split the 2015–16 season between the Wildcats and Screaming Eagles, appearing in ten games with Cape Breton, recording two assists for two points. He joined the Screaming Eagles full-time for the 2016–17 season for his rookie season and scored 22 goals and 58 points in 61 games. The Screaming Eagles qualified for the playoffs and advanced to the second round where they were eliminated by the Charlottetown Islanders. In 11 playoff games, he registered seven goals and 12 points.

He returned to the QMJHL for the 2017–18 season, splitting the year between the Screaming Eagles and the Blainville-Boisbriand Armada, to whom he was traded on January 2, 2018. In 24 games with Cape Breton, he tallied 17 goals and 39 points. The Armada won the league title as best overall regular season team and went to the playoff final before being defeated by the Acadie-Bathurst Titan. Batherson led the QMJHL in points during the 2018 playoffs, scoring 13 goals and adding 20 assists.

=== Professional ===
Leading into the National Hockey League (NHL)'s 2017 entry draft, Batherson was ranked 117th among North American skaters by the NHL Central Scouting Services. He was considered undersized and was selected in the fourth round, 121st overall by the Ottawa Senators. On October 3, 2017, the Senators signed Batherson to a three-year, entry-level contract.

Batherson began the 2018–19 season with the Senators' American Hockey League (AHL) affiliate, the Belleville Senators. After recording 20 points in 14 games, he was recalled by Ottawa on November 12. Batherson made his NHL debut with the club on November 15. He scored his first career NHL goal (a game-winning goal) on his first shot in a 2–1 win over the Detroit Red Wings. He recorded three goals and eight points before being returned to the AHL on December 18. Batherson found immediate success in the AHL and was later selected to participate in the 2019 AHL All-Star Game, where he scored five goals for the North Division and was named Most Valuable Player. On February 8, 2019, Batherson set a Belleville Senators franchise record for most goals by a rookie in a season when he scored his 12th goal of the season. He had a brief second call-up to the Senators in late February before returning to the AHL to finish the season on a line with Nick Paul and Logan Brown. He was named the AHL Rookie of the Month for February 2019. He completed the season having appeared in 20 games with Ottawa, marking three goals and nine points. In 59 games he scored 22 goals and 62 points with Belleville. He was named to the AHL's 2019 All-Rookie Team.

In 2019–20, Batherson split the season between Belleville and Ottawa. He began the season with Ottawa, making the team out of training camp, but after two games, was assigned to Belleville. During the 2019–20 AHL season, Batherson was again chosen to participate in the 2020 AHL All-Star Game after leading the league in scoring. During his time in Belleville, Batherson set franchise records for goals, assists and points. He was recalled by Ottawa in January 2020 and remained with the team until February 23, when he was sent back to Belleville. However, the season was paused on March 12, 2020, and then cancelled due to the COVID-19 pandemic. In 23 games with Ottawa, he tallied three goals and ten points and in 44 appearances with Belleville, he scored 16 goals and 54 points.

In the pandemic-shortened 2020–21 NHL season, Batherson made the Ottawa roster out of training camp. In February 2021, Batherson tied the Ottawa Senators' all-time record of scoring goals in six consecutive games. On April 17, he marked a three-point game, scoring twice and assisting on Artem Zub's first period goal in a 4–0 shutout of the Montreal Canadiens. He finished the season tied for second on the team in goals with 17 goals and fourth in points with 36 in 56 games.

On September 3, 2021, Batherson signed a six-year, $29.85 million contract with the Senators. On October 27, he scored his first NHL career hat trick on Ilya Samsonov in a 7–5 loss to the Washington Capitals, also assisting on Josh Norris' second period goal for his fourth point. He followed that up with another four-point game on November 13, scoring twice and assisting on goals by Tim Stützle and Michael Del Zotto in a 6–3 win over the Pittsburgh Penguins, ending the Senators seven-game winless streak. On December 11, he had three assists in a 4–0 shutout victory over the Tampa Bay Lightning, setting up goals by Brady Tkachuk and Josh Norris. The next game on December 14, he scored one goal and assisted on three other goals by Norris and Tkachuk, beating the Florida Panthers 8–2. He was selected to participate in the 2022 NHL All-Star Game. However, after being injured by an unexpected hit from Buffalo Sabres goaltender Aaron Dell on January 26, 2022, he was unable to attend the event. Batherson was replaced by teammate Brady Tkachuk at the All-Star Game. He returned to play on March 26, versus the Florida Panthers after missing two months and finished the season with 17 goals and 44 points in 46 games.

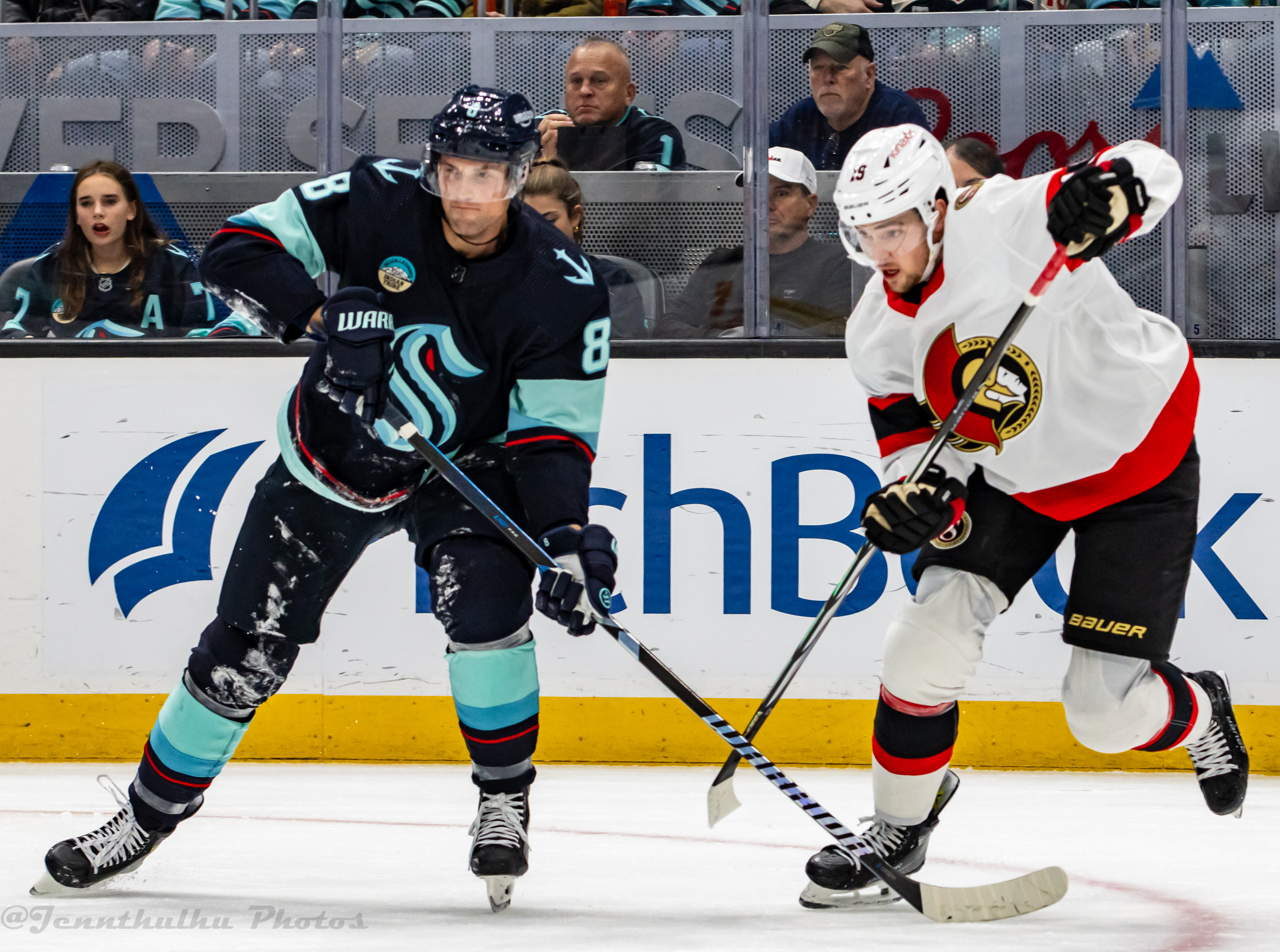
Batherson (right) battling for position against Brian Dumoulin of the Seattle Kraken in 2024.

Batherson recorded a three-point game early in the 2022–23 season on October 18, scoring one goal and assisting on goals by Stützle and Zub in a 7–5 win over the Boston Bruins. However, he had a rough November, scoring two goals and six points in 14 games. The season marked the first time Batherson played the full schedule with Ottawa. In March, Batherson stated that it was first time his ankle had felt right since its injury. He completed the season with 22 goals and 62 points in 82 games for Ottawa. He started off the 2023–24 season slow and ended up on the team's third line for a period, but eventually rebounded by December. On March 24, 2024, he tallied three points, scoring once and assisting on two goals by Jakob Chychrun in a 5–3 win over the Edmonton Oilers. He set new career highs in goals with 28, and points with 66 in 82 games.

For the 2024–25 season, Batherson played on the team's top line with Norris and Tkachuk. He scored one goal and assisted on two others by Norris in an 8–7 overtime victory over the Los Angeles Kings on October 14. Two games later on October 1, he notched two goals and assisted on another in a 5–4 win over the Tampa Bay Lightning. On December 11, he recorded a hat trick, scoring his 100th NHL goal with the first one, and added an assist in a 5–1 victory over the Anaheim Ducks. He went ten games with scoring in February–March 2025, ending it on March 13, 2025, when he scored two goals and added an assist in a 6–3 win over the Boston Bruins. He topped off the regular season on April 17, with a three-point effort, scoring two goals and assisting on Norris' replacement Dylan Cozens first period goal in a 7–5 victory over the Carolina Hurricanes. The Senators qualified for the playoffs for the first time in Batherson's career, facing the Toronto Maple Leafs in the opening round. He made his playoff debut on April 20 and scored his first NHL playoff goal in the game. The Senators were eliminated in six games in their best-of-seven series. In the six games, Batherson tallied the one goal and two points.

After a slow start to the 2025–26 season, the Senators rebounded to return to a playoff spot for the second year in a row. Batherson personally tallied 33 goals and 38 assists for 71 points in 79 games during the regular season, and led the Senators in scoring with three goals and four points in four games as they were swept in the first round by the Carolina Hurricanes.

On September 15, 2026, Batherson signed an eight-year, $86 million extension with the Ottawa Senators. The deal made him the highest paid player in Senators' history, surpassing teammate Stützle. Batherson tallied his 3rd career hat trick on October 24, during a game against the New York Rangers.

== International play ==
Medal record

Men's ice hockey

Representing Canada

World Championships
Silver medal – second place	2022 Finland	

World Junior Championships
Gold medal – first place	2018 United States	

Batherson was selected to play for Canada's national junior team at the 2018 World Junior Ice Hockey Championships. At the tournament, he broke out offensively, leading the team in goal scoring and came second in the tournament overall behind American Kieffer Bellows. He scored two goals in the quarterfinals as Canada beat Switzerland 8–2 and then followed that with a hat trick against Czechia in the semifinal 7–2 victory. In the gold medal game, he set up Tyler Steenbergen's game-winning goal in a 3–1 victory over Sweden.

He was invited to Canada's senior team for the 2022 IIHF World Championship. In the quarterfinals against Sweden, Batherson scored the winning goal in overtime. In the semifinal game versus Czechia, he recorded two assists. Canada advanced to the final, in which they lost to Finland 4–3, earning the silver medal.

== Personal life ==
Batherson has strong family ties to the Senators. He is the son of Norm Batherson, a former professional player who once played for the Ottawa organization with the Prince Edward Island Senators and the Thunder Bay Senators. His uncle Dennis Vial played several seasons with Ottawa in the 1990s and was one of the NHL's most frequent fighters over that time.

Though he grew up in Germany and Canada, Batherson was born in Fort Wayne, Indiana while his father played for the Fort Wayne Komets, and thus he possesses dual Canadian/US citizenship. Early on, he honed his hockey skills in Germany, where his father played seven seasons of pro hockey with four different teams after his North American career had ended. He was then raised in New Minas, in the Annapolis Valley region of western Nova Scotia, where the family settled after his father retired from professional hockey in 2006.

Batherson's sister Mae was drafted in the sixth round of the 2024 PWHL draft by the Minnesota Frost. Growing up, Batherson played with his sister on pond ice in the winter and rollerblades in the summer. The siblings worked together to hone their skills and similarly became known for their hockey smarts. His great uncle is Canadian Juno Award-nominated musician Matt Minglewood.

== Career statistics ==
=== Regular season and playoffs ===
			Regular season					Playoffs
Season	Team	League	GP	G	A	Pts	PIM	GP	G	A	Pts	PIM
2014–15	Valley Wildcats	MJAHL	4	2	0	2	0	1	0	0	0	0
2015–16	Valley Wildcats	MJAHL	28	4	15	19	18	6	1	2	3	8
2015–16	Cape Breton Screaming Eagles	QMJHL	10	0	2	2	2	—	—	—	—	—
2016–17	Cape Breton Screaming Eagles	QMJHL	61	22	36	58	70	11	7	5	12	14
2017–18	Cape Breton Screaming Eagles	QMJHL	24	17	22	39	39	—	—	—	—	—
2017–18	Blainville-Boisbriand Armada	QMJHL	27	12	26	38	26	22	13	20	33	19
2018–19	Belleville Senators	AHL	59	22	40	62	39	—	—	—	—	—
2018–19	Ottawa Senators	NHL	20	3	6	9	6	—	—	—	—	—
2019–20	Belleville Senators	AHL	44	16	38	54	24	—	—	—	—	—
2019–20	Ottawa Senators	NHL	23	3	7	10	13	—	—	—	—	—
2020–21	Ottawa Senators	NHL	56	17	17	34	8	—	—	—	—	—
2021–22	Ottawa Senators	NHL	46	17	27	44	32	—	—	—	—	—
2022–23	Ottawa Senators	NHL	82	22	40	62	33	—	—	—	—	—
2023–24	Ottawa Senators	NHL	82	28	38	66	42	—	—	—	—	—
2024–25	Ottawa Senators	NHL	82	26	42	68	30	6	1	1	2	10
2025–26	Ottawa Senators	NHL	79	33	38	71	33	4	3	1	4	4
NHL totals			470	149	215	364	197	10	4	2	6	14

=== International ===
Year	Team	Event	Result	GP	G	A	Pts	PIM
2018	Canada	WJC	1st place, gold medalist(s)	7	7	0	7	4
2022	Canada	WC	2nd place, silver medalist(s)	10	3	11	14	6
Junior totals				7	7	0	7	4
Senior totals				10	3	11	14	6

== Awards and honours ==
Award	Year
NHL
All-Star Game	2022
AHL
All-Star Game	2019, 2020
All-Rookie Team	2019
Second All-Star Team	2020
