= Hammersmith (band) =

Hammersmith was a Canadian rock band from Calgary, Alberta, that existed from 1975 to 1977, recording two albums which were released nationally by Mercury Records during that period.

== History ==
The early line-up of the band comprised Doran Beattie (vocals), Dan Lowe (guitar), Jeff Boyne (guitar), Royden Morice (bass guitar), and James Llewellyn (drums); Beattie, Lowe, and Morice had previously played in Painter.

The band signed to Mercury Records, which released their eponymous debut album in 1975. Canadian distribution was through Polydor. Boyne and Llewellyn subsequently left and were replaced by Craig Blair and Dale Buchner. A second album, It's For You, was released in 1976, but lack of commercial success led to the band being dropped from the label in 1977 and splitting up later that year.

Lowe and Morice went on to join 451°. Beattie established himself as a solo artist in the 1990s, concentrating on country music.

== Discography ==
=== Albums ===
- Hammersmith (1975), Mercury
- It's For You (1976), Mercury

=== Singles ===
- "Late Night Lovin' Man" (1975), Mercury
- "Funky As She Goes" (1975), Mercury
- "Dancin' Fools" (1976), Mercury
