= Vera Cruz Records =

Vera Cruz Records was a record label, based in Edmonton, Canada and distributed by CBS Records, that existed from 1978 to 1982. The label, owned by Wes Dakus, is notable for having released records by Don Everly, Hoyt Axton, One Horse Blue, Fosterchild and The Models, among others.

== Album Discography ==
- 1978 Bryan Fustukian Fustukian
- 1978 One Horse Blue One Horse Blue
- 1979 Mavis McCauley Mavis McCauley
- 1979 The Models The Models
- 1979 Hoyt Axton A Rusty Old Halo
- 1980 One Horse Blue Bite the Bullet
- 1980 Fosterchild On the Prowl
- 1980 Hoyt Axton Where Did the Money Go?
- 1980 Don Everly Brother Jukebox
- 1980 Mavis McCauley Racer
- 1981 Ronnie Prophet The Phantom
- 1981 One Horse Blue Livin' on the Edge
- 1981 P.J. Burton P.J. Burton
- 1981 Tony Prophet Tony Prophet
- 1981 Hoyt Axton Live!
- 1981 Richard Stepp Richard Stepp
- 1982 Sunband Sunband
- 1982 One Horse Blue On the Street
- 1982 Sidro's Armada One Hand Joe
- 1982 Hoyt Axton Pistol Packin' Mama
- 1982 Jo Ann Paul Jo Ann Paul
- 1982 Darkroom Pressure
