= Norm Batherson =

Canadian ice hockey player

- Born: March 27, 1969 (age 57) North Sydney, Nova Scotia, Canada
- Height: 6 ft 1 in (185 cm)
- Weight: 195 lb (88 kg; 13 st 13 lb)
- Position: Centre
- Shot: Left
- Played for: Thunder Bay Senators (ColHL); Prince Edward Island Senators (AHL); Portland Pirates (AHL); Fort Wayne Komets (IHL); Revier Lions (DEL)
- Playing career: 1994–2006

Norman Batherson (born March 27, 1969) is a Canadian former professional ice hockey player. Batherson had a long career in the North American minor leagues and European leagues. He was also a member of the 1993 Acadia Axemen Canadian University men's ice hockey champions.

== Personal biography ==
Batherson was born in North Sydney, Nova Scotia. He is the father of professional ice hockey players Drake Batherson, who currently plays for the Ottawa Senators, and Mae Batherson, who currently plays for the Vegas Vanguards. After ice hockey, he, his wife Deeann and children Drake and Anna Mae, returned to the Annapolis Valley in Nova Scotia. Batherson works for the Nova Scotia Dept. of Justice and was an assistant coach with St. Francis Xavier University. He currently lives in New Minas, Nova Scotia. Batherson's brother-in-law is former professional ice hockey player Dennis Vial. His daughter Anna is a junior player in the Provincial Women's Hockey League with Kingston, Ontario's Junior Ice Wolves.

== Career ==
Batherson played junior ice hockey with the Antigonish Bulldogs, Belleville Bulls and the Medicine Hat Tigers from 1987 until 1990. Undrafted, Batherson went to Acadia University, where he played three years with the Acadia Axemen, winning a Canadian University championship in 1993 and was 1st All-Star in the Kelly Division of the CIAU.

Batherson turned professional in 1993, joining the Ottawa Senators' organization playing for their affiliate Thunder Bay Senators of the Colonial Hockey League and the Prince Edward Island Senators of the American Hockey League (AHL). In 1994, Batherson joined the Washington Capitals' organization and played for their Portland Pirates affiliate in the AHL from 1994 until 1998, with a stint with the Fort Wayne Komets in the 1997–98 season. In 1996, Batherson was a member of their Calder Cup finalist team, scoring 11 goals and 19 points in 24 playoff games. In all, Batherson played 259 games in the AHL, scoring 65 goals and 111 assists. When he retired, Batherson still held the Pirates' franchise record for most short-handed goals in a season with six.

In 1998, he moved to Germany where he joined the Revier Lions of the Deutsche Eishockey Liga (DEL). After one season, Batherson played a further seven seasons in the 2nd Bundesliga league with Hamburg Crocodiles, SC Riessersee and Straubing Tigers before retiring in 2006. In his final season, he was a member of the Tigers' German Cup championship. He retired as the league's all-time scorer.

== Awards ==
- 1993 - 1st Team All-Star, Kelly Division CIAU
- 2008 - added to Acadia Axemen Hockey Honour Roll
- 2014 - inducted into Acadia University Sports Hall of Fame
