= One Horse Blue =

Canadian country rock music group

- Origin: Drayton Valley, Alberta, Canada
- Years active: 1975–1981, 1988–1995
- Labels: Vera Cruz; Savannah
- Past members: Winston Quelch; Bob Burghardt; Randy Lloyd; Michael Shellard; Ian Oscar; Ron (Rocko) Vaugeois; Steve Pugsley; Brent MacNab; James Wright; Gord Maxwell; Larry Pink; Jim Foster; Greg Dunstan; Andreas Schuld

One Horse Blue was a Canadian country rock music group that existed from 1975 to 1981 and, as reconstituted, from 1988 to 1995, releasing five albums.

== History ==
The band first formed as Pickens in 1975 in Edmonton, Alberta, with members Winston Quelch (guitar), Bob Burghardt (guitar), bassist Randy Lloyd, and drummer Ron (Rocko) Vaugeois. In 1977, the band asked Ian Oscar of Stash to join on vocals. When Oscar joined, the band changed their name to One Horse Blue after the 1974 Poco song from the album Cantamos. Guitarist Michael Shellard came on board shortly after, and the band began touring across Canada. In 1978, they linked up again with producer Wes Dakus who had assisted on an earlier Pickens single; Dakus took the band into Sundown Recorders to cut their first album, One Horse Blue on Vera Cruz Records, with the lead single "Deliver Me". They charted several singles on the RPM Top Country Tracks charts and recorded four albums before disbanding in 1981.

By 1988, Shellard and Vaugeois had reformed the band, with new members Gordon Maxwell and Larry Pink, as well as Andreas Schuld taking over on guitar. This line-up recorded the band's fifth, self-titled album, released in 1993. The album produced six Top 10 singles, including two Number One hits in "Hopeless Love" and "Bringing Back Your Love". In 1993 Schuld left the band and was replaced by Jim Foster, co-founder of Fosterchild.

In terms of later, occasional performances, the band was recently composed of Gord Maxwell (lead vocals, bass guitar), Larry Pink (keyboards), Michael Shellard (background vocals, and Ron (Rocko) Vaugeois (drums, background vocals).

== Discography ==
=== Albums ===
Title	Details	Peak chart positions	
Title	Details	CAN Country	CAN
One Horse Blue	Release date: 1978; Label: Vera Cruz Records	—	77
Bite the Bullet	Release date: 1980; Label: Vera Cruz Records	—	—
Livin' on the Edge	Release date: 1981; Label: Vera Cruz Records	—	—
On the Street	Release date: 1982; Label: Vera Cruz Records	—	—
One Horse Blue	Release date: 1993; Label: Savannah Records	4	—
"—" denotes releases that did not chart

=== Singles ===
Year	Single	Peak chart positions		Album
Year	Single	CAN Country	CAN	Album
1978	"Deliver Me"	—	—	One Horse Blue (1978)
1978	"Cry Out for the Sun"	—	68	One Horse Blue (1978)
1978	"You and I"	—	—	One Horse Blue (1978)
1979	"Bring My Love Around"	—	—	Bite the Bullet
1980	"Some Women"	—	—	Bite the Bullet
1980	"Crazy Fool"	—	83	Bite the Bullet
1980	"Lost and Found"	—	—	Bite the Bullet
1981	"Some Night"	—	—	Livin' on the Edge
1981	"Livin' on the Edge"	—	—	Livin' on the Edge
1990	"The Man Walks Alone"	31	—	One Horse Blue (1993)
1990	"Colours of Love"	67	—	One Horse Blue (1993)
1993	"Starting All Over Again"	7	—	One Horse Blue (1993)
1993	"Love's Looking for Me"	10	—	One Horse Blue (1993)
1994	"Baby Don't Cry"	6	—	One Horse Blue (1993)
1994	"Everything Money Can Buy"	14	—	One Horse Blue (1993)
1994	"Hopeless Love"	1	—	One Horse Blue (1993)
1995	"Bringing Back Your Love"	1	—	One Horse Blue (1993)
"—" denotes releases that did not chart

=== Music videos ===
Year	Single
1995	"Hopeless Love"
