= Painter (band) =

Canadian rock band

- Origin: Calgary, Alberta, Canada
- Genres: Rock
- Years active: 1970–?
- Past members: Bob Ego; James Llewelyn; Doran Beattie; Wayne Morice; Dan Lowe; Barry Allen; Brad Steckel

Painter was a Canadian rock band formed in 1970 in Calgary.

== Band history ==
Painter experienced a number of personnel changes. Their big hit "West Coast Woman", from the album Painter, was released in 1973. Other bands that came out of Painter include Hammersmith, 451 and Prototype.

Amongst their various alumni are a number of recording engineers. QSound was developed by Dan Lowe after experimenting in a recording session that involved multiple microphones set up around a studio. The technology was used on recordings in the 80s by Pink Floyd, Sting, Madonna and other noted artists and is currently being used in cellphones.

== Band members ==
=== Drums and percussion ===
- Bob 'Herb' Ego
- James Llewelyn

=== Lead vocals ===
- Doran 'Dorn' Beattie

=== Bass ===
- Royden 'Wayne' Morice

=== Guitar ===
- Dan Lowe
- Barry Allen
- Brad Steckel

== Selected discography ==
- Daybreak/I Do The Best I Can (1970 single)
- Country Man/Lost The Sun (1973 single) (#89 in the RPM AC charts)
- Painter (1973 album)

== Track listing for 'Painter' ==
1. West Coast Woman (#16 Canada) (#160 1973 Canadian YearEnd chart), (#79 US Hot 100)
2. Tell Me Why
3. Song For Sunshine
4. Goin' Home To Rock n' Roll (#76 Canada)
5. Space Truck
6. Kites And Gliders
7. Oh! You
8. Slave Driver
9. For You
10. Crazy Feeling
11. Goin' Down The Road
