= Fosterchild =

Canadian band

- Fosterchild, circa 1977. (l-r) Barry Boothman, Peter Sweetzir, Vern Wills, Jim Foster, Gerry Wand

Background information
- Origin: Calgary, Alberta, Canada
- Years active: 1976–1981
- Labels: Columbia; Vera Cruz
- Past members: Jim Foster; Vern Wills; Peter Sweetzir; Barry Boothman; Gerry Wand; Doug Johnson; Gordon Marr; Dwight Thompson; Bob "Mickey" Mathews

Fosterchild was a rock band from Canada that existed from 1976 to 1981, releasing three albums.

== History ==
=== Membership history ===
Fosterchild was formed in Calgary, Alberta, Canada in 1976 by Jim Foster and Vern Wills, both of whom had first played together as teenagers. In 1976, the band was signed to CBS Records Canada at the initiative of producer Bob Gallo, then head of A&R for CBS Records Canada.

The band's music was categorized as rock, with country influences, as opposed to country rock, with most of their material written or co-written by Foster and Wills. During their first recording contract, Foster and Wills were discouraged by Gallo from writing predominantly pop songs.

The core membership of the band was Foster and Wills, on guitars and vocals, initially with Gordon Marr on guitar, Dwight Thompson on bass and Bob "Mickey" Mathews on drums. Gaye Delorme produced the band's first demos, at Edmonton's Sundown Recorders. Prior to recording the band's first album, Peter Sweetzir was added on keyboards, while Barry Boothman replaced Thompson on bass and Gerry Wand replaced Mathews on drums.

=== Recording and touring history ===
The band released three albums and had two nationally charting singles, "Until We Meet Again" and "I Need Somebody Tonight". The band's regular touring base was primarily western Canada.

Fosterchild's first two albums, Fosterchild (1977) and Troubled Child (1978) were on Columbia Records, both recorded at Little Mountain Sound Studios in Vancouver, with Bob Gallo as producer. The Fosterchild album is notable as featuring renowned session drummer Larrie Londin, who had previously been a drummer in Elvis Presley's touring band and recordings.

Gordon Marr left the band, following the release of their first album. In 1978, following the release of their second album, Troubled Child, Doug Johnson was added on second keyboards for the band's tour in support of the album. However, record company interest in the band waned, and their cross-Canada tour was cut short. Their relationship with the CBS ended thereafter. Barry Boothman left the band at this point. Doug Johnson also did not continue with the group, beyond touring in support of Troubled Child.

In 1979, the band signed with Vera Cruz Records, based in Edmonton, Alberta, Canada, and released their third album, On The Prowl in 1980. The album was recorded by Foster, Wills (replacing Boothman on bass, as well as playing guitar), Sweetzir and Wand, assisted by Mavis McCauley, from One Horse Blue, on background vocals, and John Wesson on saxophone. They commenced touring with One Horse Blue, another Vera Cruz recording artist, but encountered similar tour interruptions due to financial issues with the record label.

=== Post band break-up ===
The band continued to perform until 1981. Foster then joined One Horse Blue, and in 1986 released a solo album Powerlines on RCA Records, followed by the independently-released Artist's Print in 1998. He wrote songs for One Horse Blue, Doug and the Slugs and Patricia Conroy. He also co-wrote songs with Murray McLauchlan, Rocko Vaugeois, and Lynda Scott. In 2009, he released another solo album, Lone Bird, on Quest Records, followed by releases in 2013 (A Sailor's Advice) and 2015 (6 Foot Ladder), also on Quest Records. Wills co-wrote with Loverboy ("Lady of the 80's", co-written with Paul Dean, Mike Reno, and Doug Johnson, from Loverboy's eponymous first album, 1980) and also contributed to the solo work of Jim Foster and Paul Dean. Wills continues to perform in Calgary. Doug Johnson became the keyboardist for Loverboy, as of the band's first album, in 1980. Sweetzir continued in music as the keyboardist for various artists, including Long John Baldry, Gaye Delorme, and Aaron Pritchett. Wand and Boothman later pursued careers apart from music, though Wand returned to performing, on occasion. Boothman died 2015.

Control of the band's name appears to have been lost, at least in the United States. The name "Fosterchild" is currently associated with a Philadelphia-based heavy metal band, active since 2005, and where the name appears to have been trademarked.

== Discography ==
- 1980 On The Prowl (Vera Cruz)
- 1978 Troubled Child (Columbia)
- 1977 Fosterchild (Columbia)
