= Mae Batherson =

Canadian ice hockey player (born 2000)

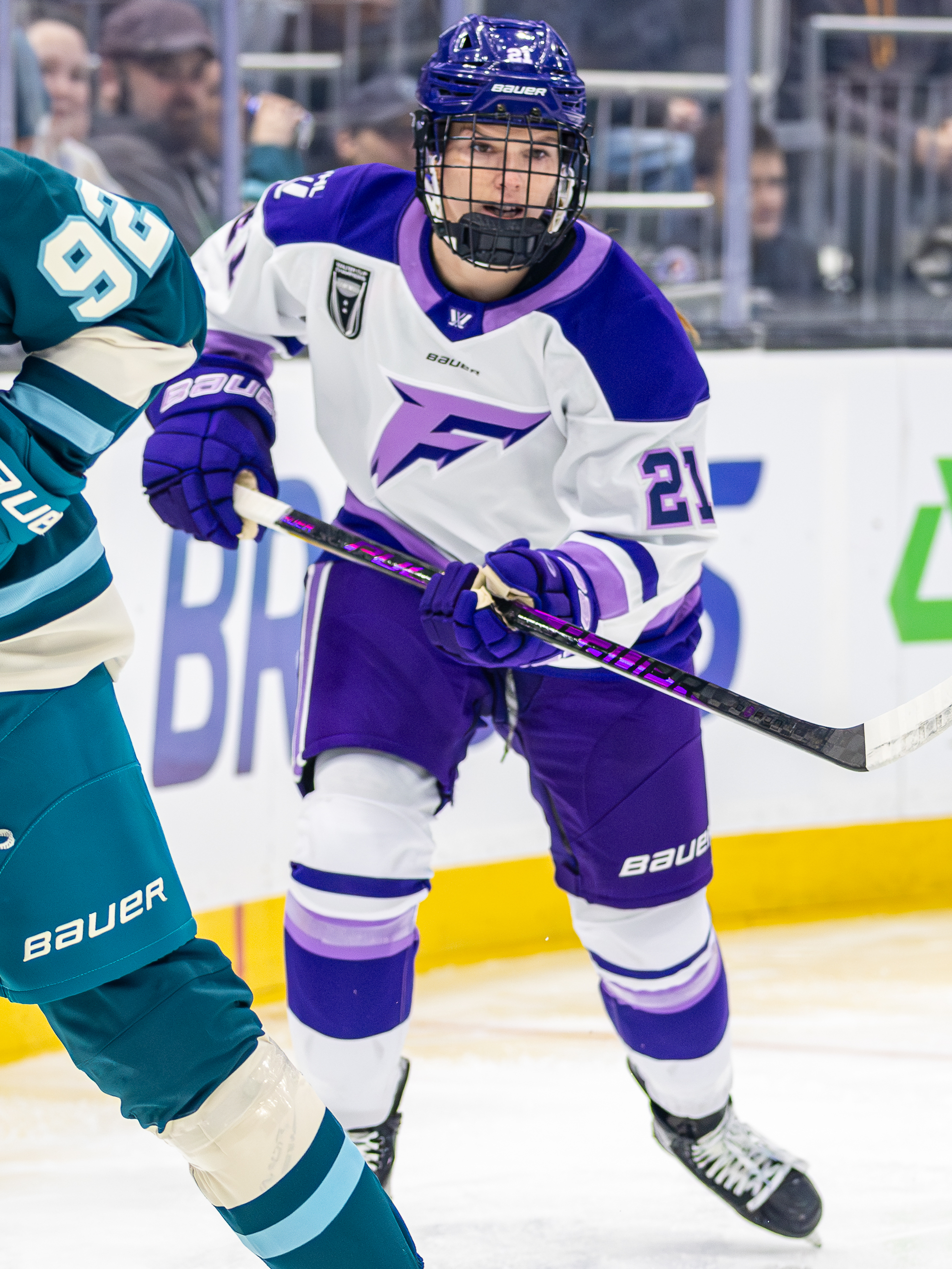
- Batherson with the Minnesota Frost in 2025
- Born: December 5, 2000 (age 25) Garmisch-Partenkirchen, Germany
- Height: 5 ft 8 in (173 cm)
- Position: Defence
- PWHL team Former teams: Vegas Vanguards; Minnesota Frost
- Playing career: 2024–present

Anna Mae Batherson (born December 5, 2000) is a Canadian professional ice hockey defenceman for the Vegas Vanguards of the Professional Women's Hockey League (PWHL). She played college ice hockey at Syracuse and St. Lawrence. She previously played for the Minnesota Frost

== Playing career ==
=== College ===
After playing for the Kingston Junior Ice Wolves, Batherson began her college hockey career at Syracuse. As a rookie, she earned CHA All-rookie honors. Her senior year, she tallied 21 points, 16 of which were assists, second on the team and 10th in the CHA. She was a 2023 All-College Hockey America First Team selectman. Batherson graduated tied as the school's fifth highest scoring defenceman of all time with 61 points (15 goals, 46 assists).

She transferred to St. Lawrence in Canton, New York for her final year of college hockey. She played in all thirty-nine games, recording eight goals and twenty-nine assists for thirty-seven points. She set the record for the most points by a defenseman in a season. She was a finalist for the ECAC Defender of the Year award and was First-Team All-ECAC.

=== Professional ===
Batherson was drafted in the sixth round, 33rd overall, by the Minnesota Frost in the 2024 PWHL Draft. She was named to the 2024 opening-day roster. During the 2024–25 season, she recorded three assists in 25 games and helped the Frost win their second consecutive Walter Cup. On June 22, 2025, she signed a two-year contract extension with the Frost. During the 2025–26 season, she recorded three goals and 12 assists in 30 regular season games, and two assists during the 2026 Walter Cup playoffs.

During the league's expansion to 12 teams ahead of the 2026–27 season, she was left unprotected by the Frost and signed a two-year contract with the Vegas Vanguards on June 6, 2026. She was one of the first players signed by the team, alongside Kendall Cooper.

== Personal life ==
Batherson was raised in New Minas, Nova Scotia. Batherson's brother is the Ottawa Senators winger Drake Batherson. Her father, Norm Batherson, played one season with the Ottawa Senators, mostly with their AHL affiliate. Her uncle, Dennis Vial, was an enforcer for the Senators in the 90s. Growing up, Batherson played with her brother on pond ice in the winter and rollerblades in the summer. The siblings worked together to hone their skills and similarly became known for their hockey smarts.

== Career statistics ==
Note: GP = Games played; G = Goals; A = Assists; Pts = Points; PIM = Penalty minutes;

			Regular season					Playoffs
Season	Team	League	GP	G	A	Pts	PIM	GP	G	A	Pts	PIM
2019–20	Syracuse University	CHA	36	6	16	22	18	—	—	—	—	—
2020–21	Syracuse University	CHA	22	4	7	11	10	—	—	—	—	—
2021–22	Syracuse University	CHA	30	0	7	7	4	—	—	—	—	—
2022–23	Syracuse University	CHA	34	5	16	21	12	—	—	—	—	—
2023–24	St. Lawrence University	ECAC	39	8	29	37	18	—	—	—	—	—
2024–25	Minnesota Frost	PWHL	25	0	3	3	6	3	0	0	0	0
2025–26	Minnesota Frost	PWHL	30	3	12	15	4	5	0	2	2	4
PWHL totals			55	3	15	18	10	8	0	2	2	4

== Awards and honors ==
Honors	Year
PWHL
Walter Cup Champion	2025
