= Brian Ferriman =

Canadian artist manager (1950–2018)

- Born: May 7, 1950; London, Ontario
- Died: December 4, 2018 (aged 68)
- Education: University of Western Ontario
- Occupation: artist manager

Brian Ferriman (May 7, 1950 – December 4, 2018) was an artist manager and the president of Savannah Music. His artist roster included such artists as Michelle Wright, Brenn Hill, The Good Brothers, R.W. Hampton, Gary Fjellgaard, Matt Minglewood, Terry Carisse, One Horse Blue, Anita Perras and Tim Taylor.

In September 2008, Ferriman was inducted into the Canadian Country Music Hall of Fame.

== Awards ==
Brian won the following awards:

- Manager of the Year, Canadian Country Music Association Awards, 1985, 1986, 1987, 1988, 1991, 1992, 1993, 1999.
- Record Industry Person of the Year, Canadian Country Music Association Awards, 1986, 1987, 1991, 1992.
- Record Company of the Year, Canadian Country Music Association Awards, Savannah Music, 1987.
- Music Publishing Company of the Year, Canadian Country Music Association, Savannah Music Group, 1990.

== Biography ==
Ferriman was born May 7, 1950, to Kenneth Cameron and Ruby Margaret Ferriman in London, Ontario, Canada.

Brian attended Oakridge High School in London upon graduation he attended the University of Western Ontario from 1968 to 1972, earning an honours bachelor's degree in English with a specialization in Drama.

Brian married Susan Kramer of Oakville, Ontario, on June 17, 1972.

Sometime in the 1970s, Brian, Jim Chapman, and Sandy Wilson renovated an old schoolhouse in Ontario to form Springfield Sound, a recording studio where such musicians as Bernard Purdie record with Brian, Jim and Sandy as their hosts. Sometime in the late seventies/early eighties Brian formed Savannah Records. Sometime in the early eighties - Brian and Sue moved to Mississauga, Ontario.

Brian and Sue's first child, Kim, is born was born November 11, 1982, and second child, Kevin, was born February 23, 1987. The Ferriman family moved to Nashville, Tennessee, in September 1991.

Brian died December 4, 2018, after battling Lewy Body Dementia.
